= 1957 in Soviet football =

Football in the Soviet Union
- Season: 1957

Men's football
- Class A: Dinamo Moscow
- Class B: Avangard Leningrad
- Soviet Cup: Lokomotiv Moscow

The 1957 Soviet football championship was the 25th seasons of competitive football in the Soviet Union and the 19th among teams of sports societies and factories. Dinamo Moscow won the championship becoming the Soviet domestic champions for the eighth time.

== Honours ==
Competition	Winner	Runner-up
Class A	Dinamo Moscow (8*)	Torpedo Moscow
Class B	Avangard Leningrad	Spartak Stanislav
Soviet Cup	Lokomotiv Moscow (2)	Spartak Moscow

Notes = Number in parentheses is the times that club has won that honour. * indicates new record for competition

== Soviet Union football championship ==
=== Class A ===
Pos	Team	Pld	W	D	L	GF	GA	GD	Pts	Qualification or relegation
1	(Russian Soviet Federative Socialist Republic) Dynamo Moscow (C)	22	16	4	2	49	15	+34	36	League champions
2	(Russian Soviet Federative Socialist Republic) Torpedo Moscow	22	11	6	5	46	23	+23	28	
3	(Russian Soviet Federative Socialist Republic) Spartak Moscow	22	11	6	5	43	28	+15	28	
4	(Russian Soviet Federative Socialist Republic) Lokomotiv Moscow	22	12	4	6	39	27	+12	28	
5	(Russian Soviet Federative Socialist Republic) CSK MO Moscow	22	13	1	8	51	31	+20	27	
6	(Ukrainian Soviet Socialist Republic) Dynamo Kiev	22	8	7	7	30	30	0	23	
7	(Georgian Soviet Socialist Republic) Dynamo Tbilisi	22	8	5	9	27	33	−6	21	
8	(Ukrainian Soviet Socialist Republic) Shakhtyor Stalino	22	7	5	10	19	35	−16	19	
9	(Moldavian Soviet Socialist Republic) Burevestnik Kishinyov	22	4	10	8	24	36	−12	18	
10	(Russian Soviet Federative Socialist Republic) Zenit Leningrad	22	4	7	11	23	41	−18	15	
11	(Russian Soviet Federative Socialist Republic) Krylia Sovetov Kuybyshev	22	2	8	12	9	32	−23	12	
12	(Byelorussian Soviet Socialist Republic) Spartak Minsk (R)	22	1	7	14	11	40	−29	9	Relegation to Class B

Source: rsssf.com
(C) Champions; (R) Relegated

=== Class B (final stage) ===
[Nov 17 – Dec 3, Tashkent] 

Pos	Rep	Team	Pld	W	D	L	GF	GA	GD	BP	Pts	Promotion
1	RUS	Avangard Leningrad	4	3	0	1	9	5	+4	0	6	Promoted
2	UKR	Spartak Stanislav	4	1	1	2	6	8	−2	1	4	
3	GEO	SKVO Tbilisi	4	1	1	2	4	6	−2	1	4	

Source: rsssf.com

=== Top goalscorers ===
Class A

- Vasiliy Buzunov (CSK MO Moscow) – 16 goals
