= Starostin =

Starostin (Russian: Ста́ростин) may refer to:

== People ==
- Pavel Starostin (born 1955), Estonian politician
- Sergei Starostin (1953-2005), Russian linguistics researcher
- Georgiy Starostin (born 1976), his son, linguistics researcher and music critic
- Sergey Nikolaevich Starostin, Russian folk and jazz musician
- The Starostin brothers, Soviet/Russian association football players
  - Nikolai Starostin (1902-1996)
  - Andrey Starostin (1906-1987)
- Anatoli Starostin, Soviet/Russian modern pentathlete and Olympic champion

== Other uses ==
- Starostín, Czech Republic

== See also ==
- Starostin's loach, a cave fish from central Asia
