= Kvashnin =

Kvashnin (masculine) or Kvashnina (feminine) is a Russian surname.

This surname is shared by the following people:

- Anatoly Kvashnin (1946–2022), Chief of the Russian General Staff from 1997 to 2004 and Hero of the Russian Federation
- Konstantin Kvashnin (1898–1982), Soviet Russian football player and manager
- Yuri Kvashnin (born 1964), Soviet Russian pair skater
