= FC Spartak Moscow =

Association football club in Russia

Spartak Moscow
- Full name: Футбольный клуб Спартак Москва (Football Club Spartak Moscow)
- Nicknames: Gladiatory (Gladiators); Narodnaya komanda (The People's Team); Krasno-Belye (Red-and-Whites); Myasniye (The Meat)
- Founded: 18 April 1922; 104 years ago
- Ground: Lukoil Arena
- Capacity: 45,360
- Owner: Lukoil (100%)
- Manager: Juan Carlos Carcedo
- League: Russian Premier League
- 2025–26: Russian Premier League, 4th of 16
- Website: spartak.com
Home colours	Away colours	Third colours

FC Spartak Moscow (Russian: ФК Спартак Москва, romanized: FK Spartak Moskva, pronounced [spɐrˈtak mɐˈskva]) is a Russian professional football club based in Moscow. Having won 12 Soviet championships (second only to Dynamo Kyiv) and 10 Russian championships (a record jointly held with Zenit St Petersburg), it is the country's most successful club. They have also won a record 10 Soviet Cups, 5 Russian Cups and one Russian Super Cup. Spartak have also reached the semi-finals of UEFA Europa League, UEFA Champions League and the UEFA Cup Winner's Cup.

== History ==
=== Foundation and early period (1883–1941) ===
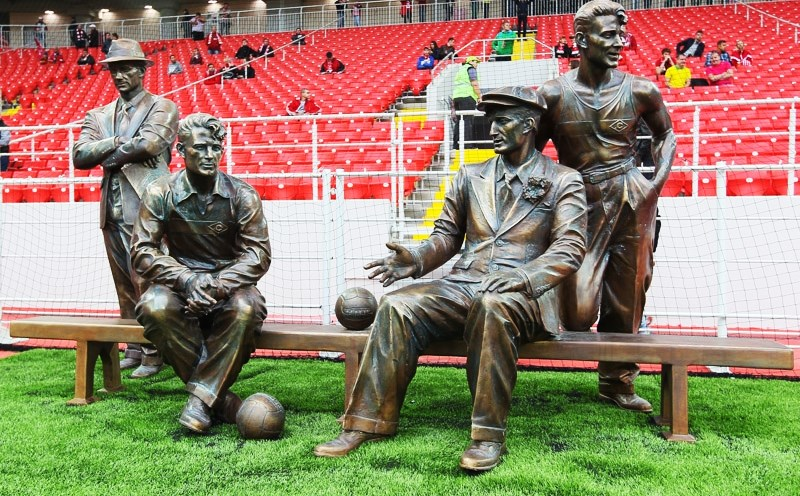
Starostin brothers, founders of Spartak Moscow

In the early days of Soviet football, government agencies such as the police, army, and railroads created their own clubs. Many statesmen saw in the wins of their teams the superiority over the opponents patronising other teams. Almost all the teams had such kind of patrons; Dynamo Moscow aligned with the Militsiya, CSKA Moscow with the Red Army, and Spartak, created by a trade union public organization, was considered to be "the people's team".

The history of the football club and sports society "Spartak" originates from the Russian Gymnastics Society (RGO Sokol), which was founded on 16 May 1883. The society was founded under the influence of the Pan-Slavic "Sokol movement" with the aim of promoting the "Sokolsk gymnastics" and then sports including fencing, wrestling, figure skating, skating, football, hockey, lawn tennis, boxing, skis, athletics, and cycling. In the RGO Sokol began to play football in the summer of 1897; the professional football section was founded in the spring of 1909. On 1 August 1920, the football team began to act under the name MCS, or Moscow Sports Club, with 18 April 1922 considered to be the formal foundation date.

In 1923, the MCS, later named Krasnaya Presnya (Red Presnya), was formed by Ivan Artemyev and involved Nikolai Starostin, especially in its football team. Presnya is a district of Moscow renowned for the radical politics of its inhabitants; for example, it represented the centre of the Moscow uprising of 1905.

The team grew, building a stadium, supporting itself from ticket sales and playing matches across the Russian SFSR. As part of a 1926 reorganization of football in the Soviet Union, Starostin arranged for the club to be sponsored by the food workers union and the club moved to the 13,000 seat Tomsky Stadium, known as Pishcheviki. The team changed sponsors repeatedly over the following years as it competed with Dinamo Moscow, whose 35,000 seat Dynamo Stadium lay close by.

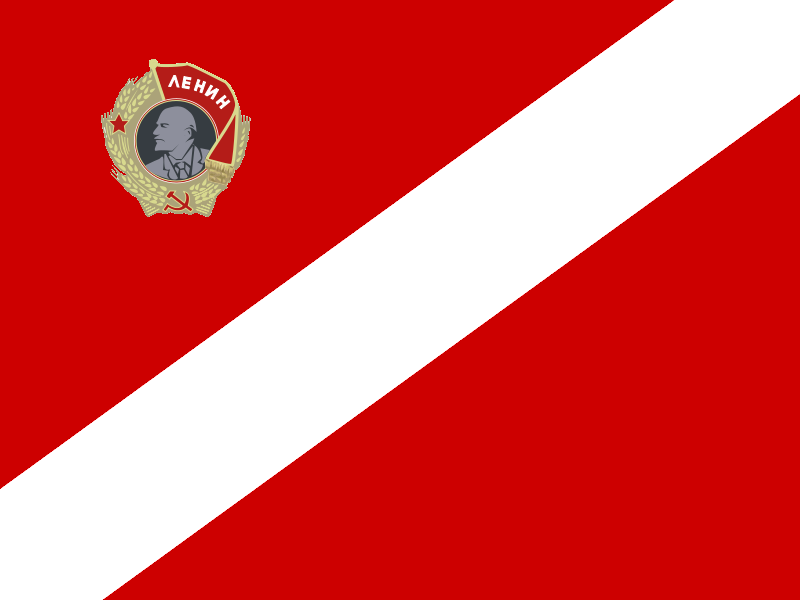
The flag of Spartak sports society

As a high-profile sportsman, Starostin came into close contact with Alexander Kosarev, secretary of the Komsomol (Communist Union of Youth) who already had a strong influence on sport and wanted to extend it. In November 1934, with funding from Promkooperatsiia, Kosarev employed Starostin and his brothers to develop his team to make it more powerful. Again the team changed its name, this time to "Spartak Moscow" (the name Spartak means "Spartacus", a gladiator who led an uprising against Ancient Rome).

The club founders, four Starostin brothers, played a big role in the formation of the team. The Starostins played for the red-whites in the 1930s but right before World War II they were subjected to repression as the leaders of the most hated team by the state authorities. Elder brother Nikolai Starostin wrote in his books that he had survived in the State Prison System due to his participation in football and with Spartak (after the political rehabilitation, in 1954, he would later return to the team as the squad's manager).

In 1935, Starostin proposed the name Spartak. It was inspired by the Italian novel Spartaco, written by Raffaello Giovagnoli, and means Spartacus ("Spartak" in Russian), a gladiator-slave who led a rebellion against Rome. Starostin is also credited with the creation of the Spartak logo. The same year, the club became a part of newly created Spartak sports society.

Czechoslovak manager Antonin Fivebr is credited as the first head coach of Spartak, though he worked as a consultant in several clubs simultaneously. In 1936, the Soviet Top League was established, where its first championship was won by Dynamo Moscow while Spartak won its second, which was held in the same calendar year. Before World War II, Spartak earned two more titles. In 1937, Spartak won the football tournament of Workers' Olympiad at Antwerp.

=== Post-war period (1945–1991) ===
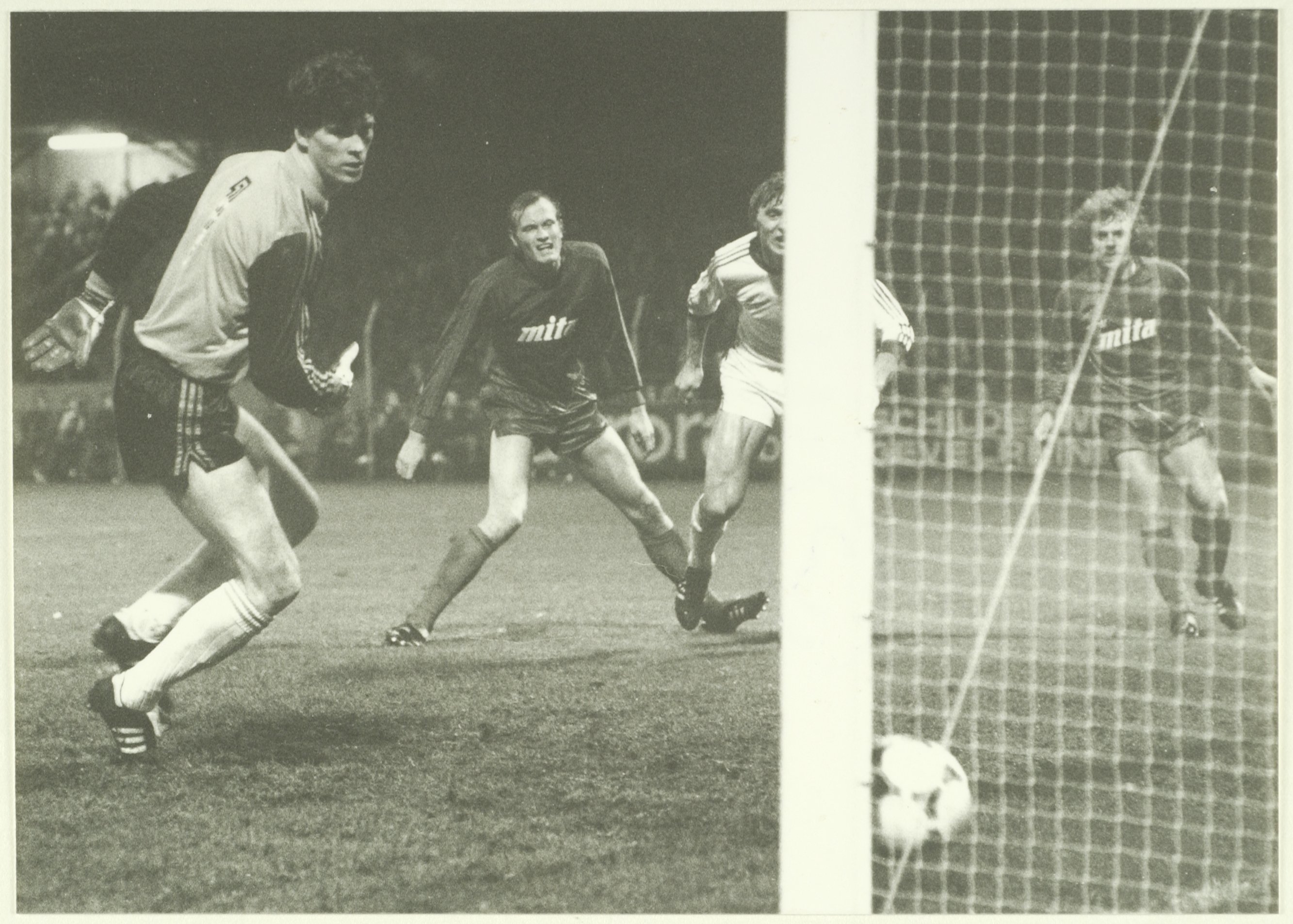
Spartak against HFC Haarlem in 1982

During the 1950s, Spartak, together with Dynamo, dominated the Soviet Top League. When the Soviet national team won gold medals at the Melbourne Olympics, it consisted largely of Spartak players. Spartak captain Igor Netto was the captain of the national team from 1954 to 1963. In the 1960s, Spartak won two league titles, but by the mid-1960s, Spartak was no more regarded as a leading Soviet club. The club was even less successful in the 1970s and in 1976 Spartak was relegated into the lower league.

The following season in 1979, fans stayed with the team despite being relegated to the lower division, keeping the stadium full. Konstantin Beskov became the head coach. He had made his name playing for Spartak's main rivals, Dynamo Moscow). He introduced several young players, including Rinat Dasayev and Georgi Yartsev. Spartak returned the following season and won the title in 1979, beating Dynamo Kyiv.

On 20 October 1982, disaster struck during the UEFA Cup match between Spartak and Dutch club HFC Haarlem. Sixty-six people died in a crowd crush during the match, making it Russia's worst sporting disaster.

In 1989, Spartak won its last USSR Championship, rivals Dynamo Kyiv 2–1 in the closing round. Spartak's striker Valery Shmarov scored the "golden" free kick with almost no time left. The next season, Spartak reached the European Cup semi-final, consequently eliminating Napoli on penalties and Real Madrid (with 3–1 away victory), but losing to Marseille.

=== Modern period (1991–present) ===
==== Initial success (1991–2004) ====
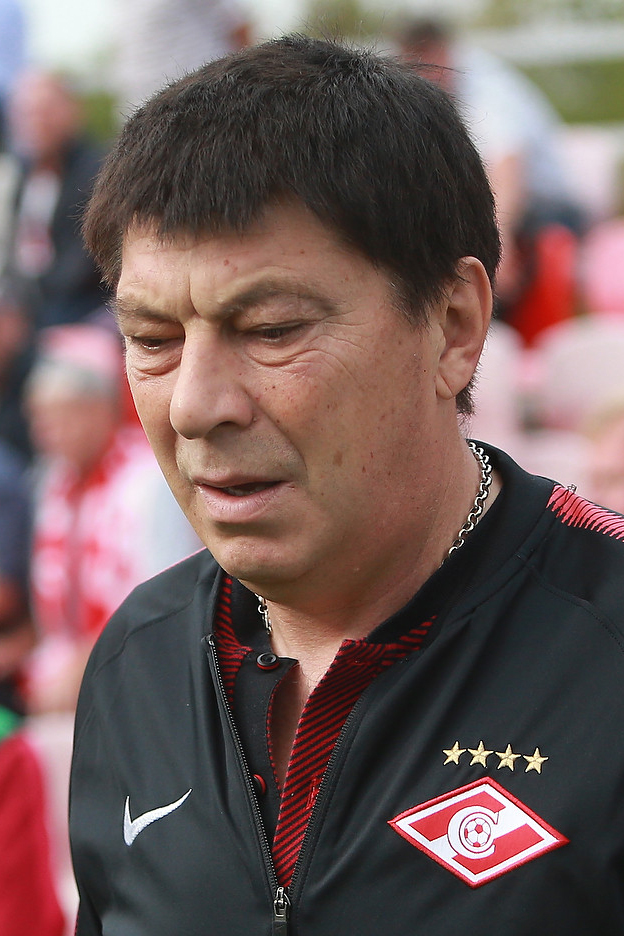
Rinat Dasaev, IFFHS World's Best Goalkeeper in 1988

A new page in the club's history began when the Soviet Union collapsed and its championship ceased to exist. In the newly created Russian league, Spartak, led by coach and president Oleg Romantsev, dominated and won all but one title between 1992 and 2001. Season after season the team also represented Russia in the Champions League.

Problems began in the new century, however. Several charismatic players (Ilya Tsymbalar and Andrey Tikhonov among others) left the club as a result of conflict with Romantsev. Later, Romantsev sold his stock to oil magnate Andrei Chervichenko, who in 2003 became the club president. The two were soon embroiled in a row that would continue until Romantsev was sacked in 2003 with the club suffering several sub-par seasons until Chervichenko finally sold his stock in 2004. The new ownership made a number of front office changes with the aim of returning the team to the top of the Russian Premier League.

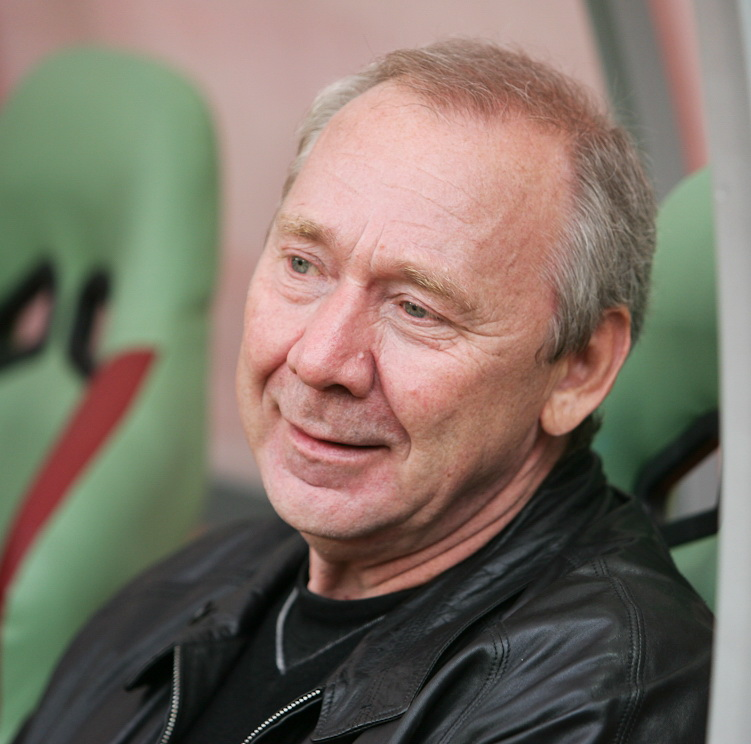
Oleg Romantsev, the most successful coach in club history

Spartak has been entitled to place a golden star on its badge since 2003 to commemorate winning five Russian championships in 1992, 1993, 1994, 1996 and 1997. They have won the championship another four times since 1997.

==== Title-less run (2004–2016) ====
In 2004, Leonid Fedun became the club's President and second-largest shareholder behind his business partner Vagit Alekperov.

In the 2005 season, Spartak, led by Aleksandrs Starkovs, finished second in the league to beat Lokomotiv Moscow, Zenit Saint Petersburg and Rubin Kazan to the last Champions League place. Following a mixed start to the 2006 season and public criticism from Dmitry Alenichev, the team's captain and one of its most experienced players, Starkovs left his position to Vladimir Fedotov.

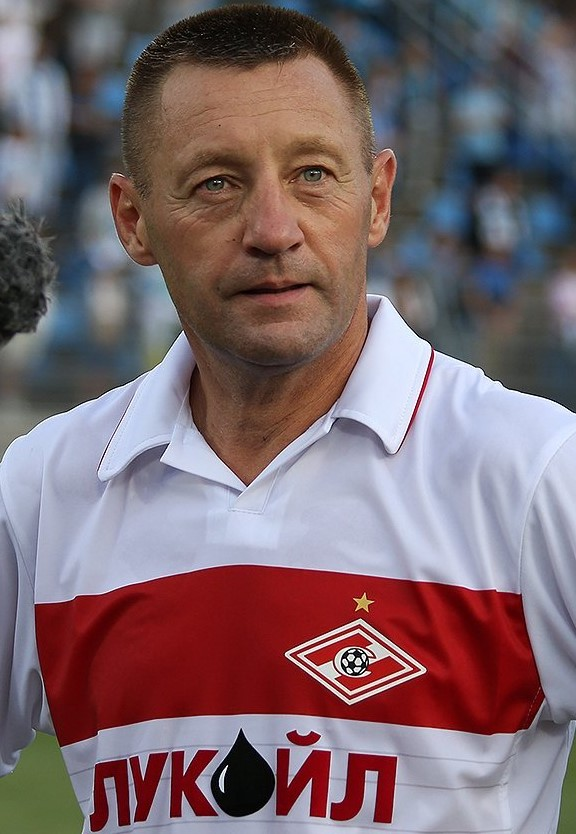
Club icon Andrey Tikhonov had two spells as a Spartak player, from 1992 to 2000 and in 2011, before being appointed assistant manager

In the 2012–13 season, Spartak qualified for the 2012–13 UEFA Champions League group stage and finished last after disappointing performances against FC Barcelona, Celtic and Benfica. In the league, Spartak finished in fourth place while in the cup it was eliminated in the round of 16 by FC Rostov 0–0 (3–5 p), completing a disappointing season.

Since 2013, the club have added another three stars as rules allowed teams to include titles won during the Soviet era.

The next 3 seasons (2013–14, 2014–15, 2015–16) were somewhat similar as Spartak finished 6th, 6th and 5th accordingly while the club did not qualify for European Competitions.

==== Revival (2016–2022) ====
By the beginning of the 2016–17 season, under ex-Juventus manager Massimo Carrera, Spartak had acquired a squad consisting of foreign talents such as Quincy Promes, Fernando, Zé Luís, Lorenzo Melgarejo and Russians such as Denis Glushakov, Roman Zobnin and Ilya Kutepov. Spartak won the 2016–17 Russian Premier League with the squad, winning most derbies and ultimately finishing with a difference of 7 points.

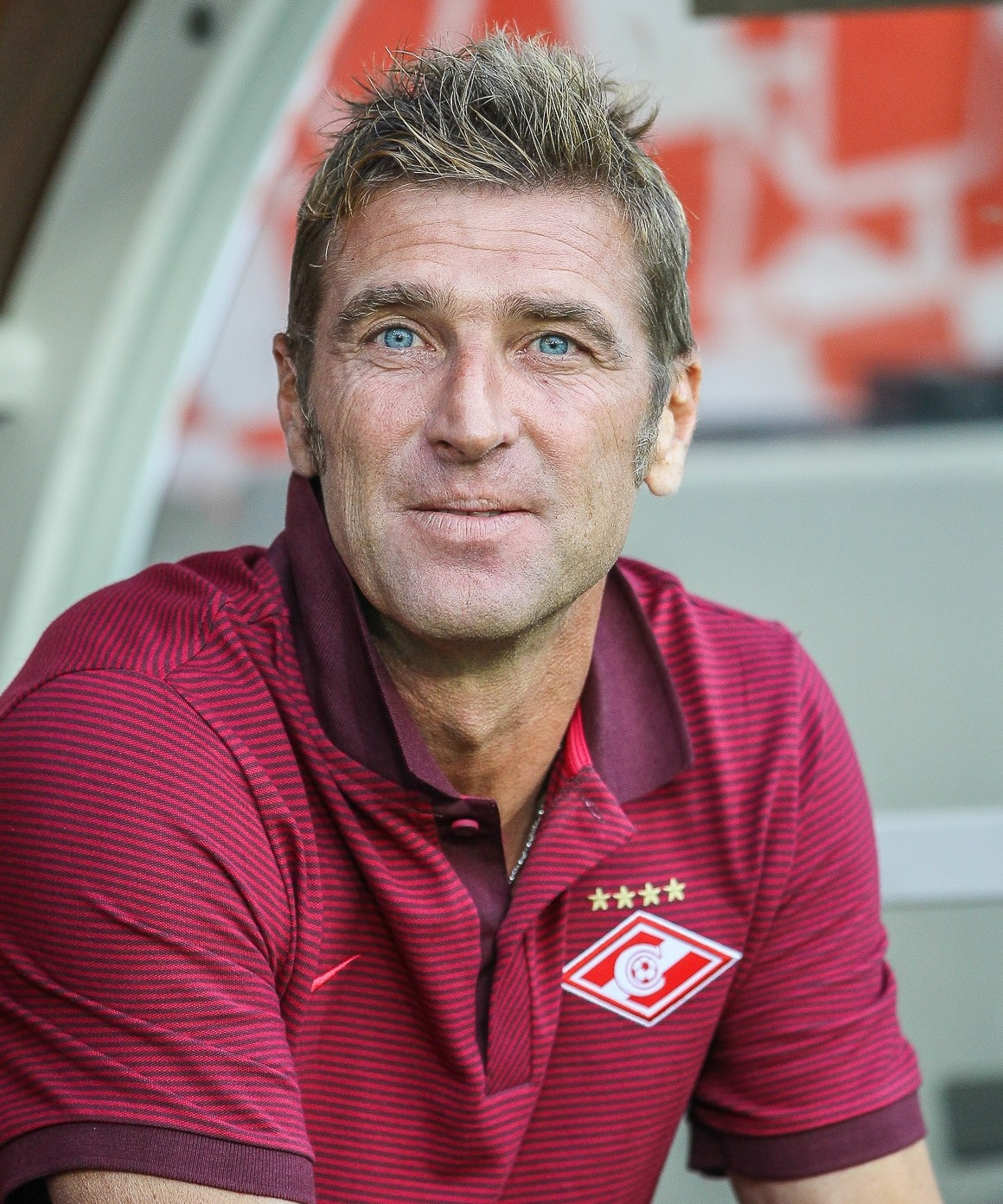
Massimo Carrera helped Spartak win the first league title in 16 years.

The following season, Spartak participated in the 2017–18 UEFA Champions League group stage. Despite suffering its greatest ever loss in a 7-0 result against Liverpool F.C. at Anfield, the club achieved considerable victories, including a 5-1 win against Sevilla FC.

Having finished second 2020-21 Russian Premier League under manager Domenico Tedesco, whose contract expired at the season's end, Spartak followed up with a successful run in the 2021–22 UEFA Europa League, now led by Rui Vitoria. Spartak topped its group, which included Napoli (which it defeated both home and away), Leicester City and Legia Warsaw. It was set to face RB Leipzig in the round of 16, but the club - along with all Russian club and national teams - was suspended from FIFA, UEFA and the ECA until further notice, and the clubs continued to play with themselves.

On 29 May 2022, in the final match of Paolo Vanoli (manager since December 2021), Spartak won the 2021–22 Russian Cup.

==== New ownership (2022–present) ====
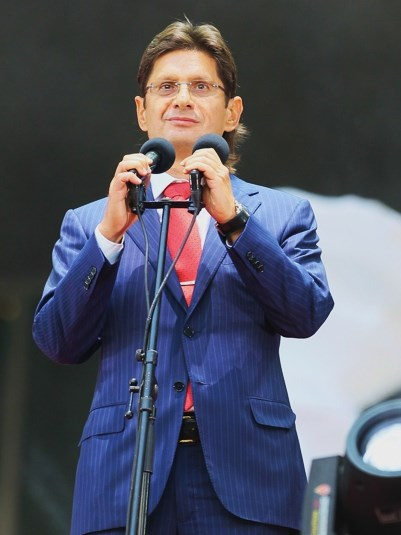
Longtime President Leonid Fedun resigned after selling the club.

On 22 August 2022, PJSC Lukoil Oil Company announced the acquisition of Spartak Moscow and Otkritie Arena. This occurred after numerous changes at the club, such as the appointment of Spanish specialist Guillermo Abascal as manager, his assistants Carlos Maria Valle Moreno and Vladimir Slišković, physical training coaches Fernando Perez Lopez and Alexander Zaichenko, and goalkeeper coach Vasily Kuznetsov. At 33 years of age, Abascal became the youngest manager in the club's history. It was also reported that Leonid Fedun has resigned as President of the club and member of the board of directors. Under his leadership of more than 18 years, he left behind a mixed legacy. The club had won only a single Russian league, cup and supercup. Second place in the league was achieved six times, and four times the club head reached the group stage of the Champions League. A stadium solely for the use of the club was built for the first time. On 26 September 2022 Alexander Matytsyn, first vice president of Lukoil, became chairman of the board of directors of FC Spartak. Lukoil's top managers Pavel Zhdanov, Ivan Maslyaev, and Yevgeny Khavkin joined the board of directors, as did Spartak's general director Yevgeny Melezhikov (left the club in the summer of 2023), academy president Sergei Rodionov, as well as independent directors Oleg Malyshev and Yusuf Alekperov. Englishman Paul Ashworth was appointed sporting director. In December 2023, it was announced that the club was reviving a second team, closed in 2022 due to lack of funding. However today Spartak Moscow offer youth sectors for both boys and girls as well as having a women's team playing in the Russian Women's Premier League.

On 24 May 2026, Spartak won the 2025–26 Russian Cup.

Théo Bongonda was selected to represent DR Congo at the 2026 FIFA World Cup (even though it was announced earlier his Spartak contract will not be extended after it expires in late June during the World Cup).

== Honours ==
=== Domestic competitions ===
- Soviet Top League/Russian Premier League
  - Champions (22) (record): 1936 (autumn), 1938, 1939, 1952, 1953, 1956, 1958, 1962, 1969, 1979, 1987, 1989 / 1992, 1993, 1994, 1996, 1997, 1998, 1999, 2000, 2001, 2016–17
  - Runners-up (18): 1937, 1954, 1955, 1963, 1968, 1974, 1980, 1981, 1983, 1984, 1985, 1991, 2005, 2006, 2007, 2009, 2011–12, 2020–21
- Soviet Cup/Russian Cup
  - Winners (15) (record): 1938, 1939, 1946, 1947, 1950, 1958, 1963, 1965, 1971, 1992, 1993–94, 1997–98, 2002–03, 2021–22, 2025–26
  - Runners-up (7): 1948, 1952, 1957, 1972, 1981, 1995–96, 2005–06
- Russian Super Cup
  - Winners (1): 2017
  - Runners-up (5): 2004, 2006, 2007, 2022, 2026
- Soviet First League
  - Champions (1): 1977
- USSR Federation Cup
  - Winners (1): 1987

=== International ===
- Commonwealth of Independent States Cup
  - Winners (6): 1993, 1994, 1995, 1999, 2000, 2001
  - Runners-up (3): 1997, 1998, 2002

=== Non-official ===
- Match Premier Cup
  - Winners: 2019, 2020, 2021
- Ciutat de Barcelona Trophy
  - Winners: 1982
- Copa del Sol
  - Winners: 2012

== European record ==
=== Notable European campaigns ===
Season	Achievement	Notes
European Cup / UEFA Champions League
1980–81	Quarter-final	eliminated by Real Madrid 0–0 in Tbilisi, 0–2 in Madrid
1990–91	Semi-final	eliminated by Marseille 1–3 in Moscow, 1–2 in Marseille
1993–94	Group stage	finished third in a group with Barcelona, AS Monaco and Galatasaray
1995–96	Quarter-final	eliminated by Nantes 2–2 in Moscow, 0–2 in Nantes
2000–01	Second group stage	finished fourth in a group with Bayern Munich, Arsenal and Lyon
UEFA Cup Winners' Cup
1972–73	Quarter-final	eliminated by Milan 0–1 in Moscow, 1–1 in Milan
1992–93	Semi-final	eliminated by Antwerp 1–0 in Moscow, 1–3 in Antwerp
UEFA Cup / UEFA Europa League
1983–84	Quarter-final	eliminated by Anderlecht 2–4 in Brussels, 1–0 in Tbilisi
1997–98	Semi-final	eliminated by Internazionale 1–2 in Moscow, 1–2 in Milan
2010–11	Quarter-final	eliminated by Porto 1–5 in Porto, 2–5 in Moscow

=== UEFA club competition record ===
Competition	Pld	W	D	L	GF	GA	GD	Win%
UEFA Champions League	122	40	31	51	173	189	−16	32.79
UEFA Europa League	114	59	22	33	180	138	+42	51.75
UEFA Cup Winners' Cup	18	10	4	4	31	17	+14	55.56
Total	254	109	57	88	382	341	+41	42.91

=== UEFA coefficient ===
Correct as of 12 August 2026.

Rank	Team	Points
150	(Lithuania) FK Žalgiris	12.000
151	(Ukraine) Zorya Luhansk	12.000
152	(Russia) FC Spartak Moscow	12.000
153	(Iceland) Víkingur Reykjavík	11.750
154	(Scotland) Heart of Midlothian F.C.	11.500

=== Football Club Elo ranking ===
As of 16 August 2026

Rank	Team	Points
107	(Spain) Elche	1684
108	(Spain) Sevilla	1682
109	(Russia) FC Spartak Moscow	1681
110	(Germany) Borussia Mönchengladbach	1681
111	(Argentina) CA Belgrano	1681

== League history ==
=== Soviet Union ===
Season	Div.	Pos.	Pl.	W	D	L	GS	GA	P	Cup	Europe		Top scorer (league)	Manager/acting manager
1936 (s)	1st	3	6	3	1	2	12	7	13	-	-		(Soviet Union) Glazkov – 4	(Soviet Union) Kozlov
1936 (a)	1st	1	7	4	2	1	19	10	17	QF	-		(Soviet Union) Glazkov – 7	(Soviet Union) Kozlov
1937	1st	2	16	8	5	3	24	16	37	R16	-		(Soviet Union) Rumyantsev – 8	(Soviet Union) Kvashnin
1938	1st	1	25	18	3	4	74	19	39	W	-		(Soviet Union) Sokolov – 18	(Soviet Union) Kvashnin (Soviet Union) P.Popov
1939	1st	1	26	14	9	3	58	23	37	W	-		(Soviet Union) Semyonov – 18	(Soviet Union) P.Popov
1940	1st	3	24	13	5	6	54	35	31	-	-		(Soviet Union) Semyonov – 13 (Soviet Union) Kornilov – 13	(Soviet Union) Gorokhov
1944	1st	no league competition								SF	-		-	(Soviet Union) Kvashnin
1945	1st	10	22	6	3	13	22	44	15	R16	-		(Soviet Union) Timakov – 7	(Soviet Union) Isakov (Soviet Union) Vollrat
1946	1st	6	22	8	5	9	38	40	21	W	-		(Soviet Union) Salnikov – 9	(Soviet Union) Vollrat
1947	1st	8	24	6	9	9	34	26	21	W	-		(Soviet Union) Dementyev – 9	(Soviet Union) Vollrat
1948	1st	3	26	18	1	7	64	34	37	RU	-		(Soviet Union) Konov – 15	(Soviet Union) Kvashnin
1949	1st	3	34	21	7	6	93	43	49	SF	-		(Soviet Union) Simonyan – 26	(Soviet Union) Dangulov
1950	1st	5	36	17	10	9	77	40	44	W	-		(Soviet Union) Simonyan – 34	(Soviet Union) Dangulov
1951	1st	6	28	13	5	10	50	35	31	QF	-		(Soviet Union) Simonyan – 10	(Soviet Union) Dangulov (Soviet Union) Gorokhov (Soviet Union) Glazkov
1952	1st	1	13	9	2	2	26	12	20	RU	-		(Soviet Union) Paramonov – 8	(Soviet Union) Sokolov
1953	1st	1	20	11	7	2	47	15	29	QF	-		(Soviet Union) Simonyan – 14	(Soviet Union) Sokolov
1954	1st	2	24	14	3	7	49	26	31	R16	-		(Soviet Union) Ilyin – 11	(Soviet Union) Sokolov
1955	1st	2	22	15	3	4	55	27	33	SF	-		(Soviet Union) Parshin – 13	(Soviet Union) Gulyaev
1956	1st	1	22	15	4	3	68	28	34	-	-		(Soviet Union) Simonyan – 16	(Soviet Union) Gulyaev
1957	1st	3	22	11	6	5	43	28	28	RU	-		(Soviet Union) Simonyan – 12	(Soviet Union) Gulyaev
1958	1st	1	22	13	6	3	55	28	32	W	-		(Soviet Union) Ilyin – 19	(Soviet Union) Gulyaev
1959	1st	6	22	8	8	6	32	28	24	-	-		(Soviet Union) Isaev – 8	(Soviet Union) Gulyaev
1960	1st	7	30	15	7	8	52	32	37	R16	-		(Soviet Union) Ilyin – 13	(Soviet Union) Simonyan
1961	1st	3	30	16	8	6	57	34	40	R16	-		(Soviet Union) Khusainov – 14	(Soviet Union) Simonyan
1962	1st	1	32	21	5	6	61	25	47	R16	-		(Soviet Union) Sevidov – 16	(Soviet Union) Simonyan
1963	1st	2	38	22	8	8	65	33	52	W	-		(Soviet Union) Sevidov – 15	(Soviet Union) Simonyan
1964	1st	8	32	12	8	12	34	32	32	SF	-		(Soviet Union) Sevidov – 6	(Soviet Union) Simonyan
1965	1st	8	32	10	12	10	28	26	32	W	-		(Soviet Union) Khusainov – 5 (Soviet Union) Reingold – 5	(Soviet Union) Simonyan
1966	1st	4	36	15	12	9	45	41	42	QF	-		(Soviet Union) Osyanin – 15	(Soviet Union) Gulyaev
1967	1st	7	36	13	14	9	38	30	40	R32	CWC	R16	(Soviet Union) Khusainov – 8	(Soviet Union) Salnikov (Soviet Union) Simonyan
1968	1st	2	38	21	10	7	64	43	52	R32	-		(Soviet Union) Khusainov – 14	(Soviet Union) Simonyan
1969	1st	1	32	24	6	2	51	15	54	R32	-		(Soviet Union) Osyanin – 16	(Soviet Union) Simonyan
1970	1st	3	32	12	14	6	43	25	38	QF	-		(Soviet Union) Khusainov – 12	(Soviet Union) Simonyan
1971	1st	6	30	9	13	8	35	31	31	W	ECC	R32	(Soviet Union) Kiselyov – 5 (Soviet Union) Silagadze – 5 (Soviet Union) Piskarev – 5	(Soviet Union) Simonyan
1972	1st	11	30	8	10	12	29	30	26	RU	UC	R32	(Soviet Union) Papaev – 4 (Soviet Union) Andreev – 4 (Soviet Union) Piskarev – 4	(Soviet Union) Simonyan
1973	1st	4	30	14	8	8	37	28	31	QF	CWC	QF	(Soviet Union) Piskarev – 12	(Soviet Union) Gulyaev
1974	1st	2	30	15	9	6	41	23	39	QF	-		(Soviet Union) Piskarev – 10	(Soviet Union) Gulyaev
1975	1st	10	30	9	10	11	27	30	28	R16	UC	R64	(Soviet Union) Lovchev – 8	(Soviet Union) Gulyaev
1976 (s)	1st	14	15	4	2	9	10	18	10	-	UC	R16	(Soviet Union) Pilipko – 2 (Soviet Union) Lovchev – 2 (Soviet Union) Bulgakov – 2	(Soviet Union) Krutikov
1976 (a)	1st	15	15	5	3	7	15	18	13	R32	-		(Soviet Union) Bulgakov – 6	(Soviet Union) Krutikov
1977	2nd	1	38	22	10	6	83	42	54	R16	-		(Soviet Union) Yartsev – 17	(Soviet Union) Beskov
1978	1st	5	30	14	5	11	42	33	33	R16	-		(Soviet Union) Yartsev – 19	(Soviet Union) Beskov
1979	1st	1	34	21	10	3	66	25	50	Qual.	-		(Soviet Union) Yartsev – 14	(Soviet Union) Beskov
1980	1st	2	34	18	9	7	49	26	45	SF	-		(Soviet Union) Rodionov – 7	(Soviet Union) Beskov
1981	1st	2	34	19	8	7	70	40	46	RU	ECC	QF	(Soviet Union) Gavrilov – 21	(Soviet Union) Beskov
1982	1st	3	34	16	9	9	59	35	41	Qual.	UC	R32	(Soviet Union) Shavlo – 11	(Soviet Union) Beskov
1983	1st	2	34	18	9	7	60	25	45	R16	UC	R16	(Soviet Union) Gavrilov – 18	(Soviet Union) Beskov
1984	1st	2	34	18	9	7	53	29	45	QF	UC	QF	(Soviet Union) Rodionov – 13	(Soviet Union) Beskov
1985	1st	2	34	18	10	6	72	28	46	R16	UC	R16	(Soviet Union) Rodionov – 14	(Soviet Union) Beskov
1986	1st	3	30	14	9	7	52	21	37	SF	UC	R16	(Soviet Union) Rodionov – 17	(Soviet Union) Beskov
1987	1st	1	30	16	11	3	49	26	42	R16	UC	R16	(Soviet Union) Rodionov – 12 (Soviet Union) Cherenkov – 12	(Soviet Union) Beskov
1988	1st	4	30	14	11	5	40	26	39	QF	UC	R32	(Soviet Union) Rodionov – 12	(Soviet Union) Beskov
1989	1st	1	30	17	10	3	49	19	44	QF	ECC	R16	(Soviet Union) Rodionov – 16	(Soviet Union) Romantsev
1990	1st	5	24	12	5	7	39	26	29	R16	UC	R32	(Soviet Union) Shmarov – 12	(Soviet Union) Romantsev
1991	1st	2	30	17	7	6	57	30	41	QF	ECC	SF	(Soviet Union) (Russia) Mostovoi – 13 (Soviet Union) (Russia) Radchenko – 13	(Soviet Union) Romantsev
1992	-	-								W	UC	R32	-	(Soviet Union) (Russia) Romantsev

=== Russia ===
Season	Div.	Pos.	Pl.	W	D	L	GS	GA	P	Cup	Europe		Top scorer (league)	Manager/acting manager
1992	1st	1	26	18	7	1	62	19	43	-	-		(Russia) Radchenko – 12	(Russia) Romantsev
1993	1st	1	34	21	11	2	81	18	53	R32	CWC	SF	(Russia) Beschastnykh – 18	(Russia) Romantsev
1994	1st	1	30	21	8	1	73	21	50	W	UCL	GS	(Russia) Beschastnykh – 10	(Russia) Romantsev
1995	1st	3	30	19	7	5	76	26	63	SF	UCL	GS	(Russia) Shmarov – 16	(Russia) Romantsev
1996	1st	1	35	22	9	4	72	35	75	RU	UCL	QF	(Russia) Tikhonov – 16	(Russia) Yartsev
1997	1st	1	34	22	7	5	67	30	73	QF	UC	R32	(Russia) (Uzbekistan) Kechinov – 11	(Russia) Romantsev
1998	1st	1	30	17	8	5	58	27	59	W	UCL; UC	Qual. SF	(Russia) (Ukraine) Tsymbalar – 10	(Russia) Romantsev
1999	1st	1	30	22	6	2	75	24	72	R32	UCL	GS	(Russia) Tikhonov – 19	(Russia) Romantsev
2000	1st	1	30	23	1	6	69	30	70	SF	UCL; UC	GS; R32	(Russia) Titov – 13	(Russia) Romantsev
2001	1st	1	30	17	9	4	56	30	60	QF	UCL	2nd GS	(Russia) Titov – 11 (Brazil) Robson – 11	(Russia) Romantsev
2002	1st	3	30	16	7	7	49	36	55	R32	UCL	GS	(Russia) Beschastnykh – 12	(Russia) Romantsev
2003	1st	10	30	10	6	14	38	48	36	W	UCL	GS	(Russia) Pavlyuchenko – 10	(Russia) Romantsev (Russia) Chernyshov (Russia) Fedotov (Italy) Scala
2004	1st	8	30	11	7	12	43	44	40	R32	UC; UIC	R16; QF	(Russia) Pavlyuchenko – 10	(Italy) Scala (Latvia) Starkov
2005	1st	2	30	16	8	6	47	26	56	R32	-		(Russia) Pavlyuchenko – 11	(Latvia) Starkov
2006	1st	2	30	15	13	2	60	36	58	RU	-		(Russia) Pavlyuchenko – 18	(Latvia) Starkov (Russia) Fedotov
2007	1st	2	30	17	8	5	50	30	59	SF	UCL; UC	GS; R32	(Russia) Pavlyuchenko – 14	(Russia) Fedotov (Russia) Cherchesov
2008	1st	8	30	11	11	8	43	39	44	R32	UCL; UC	Qual. R32	(Russia) Bazhenov – 6 (Russia) Pavlyuchenko – 6 (Russia) Pavlenko – 6 (Brazil) Welliton – 6	(Russia) Cherchesov (Denmark) M. Laudrup
2009	1st	2	30	17	4	9	61	33	55	QF	-		(Brazil) Welliton – 21	(Denmark) M. Laudrup (Russia) Karpin
2010	1st	4	30	13	10	7	43	33	10	R16	UCL; UC	Qual. GS	(Brazil) Welliton – 19	(Russia) Karpin
2011–12	1st	2	44	21	12	11	68	48	75	R16	UC	Qual	(Nigeria) Emenike – 13	(Russia) Karpin
2012–13	1st	4	30	15	6	9	51	39	51	R16	UCL	GS	(Armenia) Y. Movsisyan – 13	(Spain) Emery (Russia) Karpin
2013–14	1st	6	30	15	5	10	46	36	50	R16	UC	Qual	(Armenia) Y. Movsisyan – 16	(Russia) Karpin (Russia) Gunko
2014–15	1st	6	30	12	8	10	42	42	44	R16	-		(Netherlands) Promes – 13	(Switzerland) Yakin
2015–16	1st	5	30	15	5	10	48	39	50	R16	-		(Netherlands) Promes – 18	(Russia) Alenichev
2016–17	1st	1	30	22	3	5	46	27	69	R32	UC	Qual	(Netherlands) Promes – 11	(Russia) Alenichev (Italy) Carrera
2017–18	1st	3	30	16	8	6	51	32	56	SF	UCL	GS	(Netherlands) Promes – 15	(Italy) Carrera
2018–19	1st	5	30	14	7	9	36	31	49	QF	UCL; UEL	Qual. GS	(Cape Verde) Zé Luís – 10	(Italy) Carrera (Russia) Kononov
2019–20	1st	7	30	11	6	13	35	33	39	QF	UEL	Qual.	(Russia) A.Sobolev – 12	(Russia) Kononov (Germany) Tedesco
2020–21	1st	2	30	17	6	7	52	34	57	R16	-		(Sweden) Larsson – 15	(Germany) Tedesco
2021–22	1st	10	30	10	8	12	16	19	38	W	UEL	R16 (Note: Spartak Moscow had qualified for the round of 16 as a group winner, but were disqualified from the competition before playing that round due to the Russian invasion of Ukraine.)	(Russia) A.Sobolev – 9	(Portugal) Rui Vitoria (Italy) Vanoli

=== Top goalscorers ===
As of match played 12 November 2022

	Name	Years	League	Russian Cup	Europe	Other	Total
1	(Soviet Union) Nikita Simonyan	1949–1959	133 (233)	? (?)	? (?)	? (?)	133 (233)
2	(Soviet Union) Sergey Rodionov	1979–1990; 1993–1995	124 (303)	? (?)	? (?)	? (?)	124 (303)
3	(Soviet Union) Galimzyan Khusainov	1961–1973	102 (350)	? (?)	? (?)	? (?)	102 (350)
4	(Russia) Yegor Titov	1995–2008	86 (324)	3 (42)	15 (77)	1 (2)	105 (445)
5	(Netherlands) Quincy Promes	2014–2018; 2021–Present	80 (164)	10 (15)	5 (17)	1 (2)	98 (198)
6	(Soviet Union) Fyodor Cherenkov	1977–1990; 1991–1993	95 (398)	? (?)	? (?)	? (?)	95 (398)
7	(Russia) Andrey Tikhonov	1992–2000; 2011	68 (192)	4 (20)	18 (51)	(-)	90 (263)
8	(Soviet Union) Yuri Gavrilov	1977–1985	89 (280)	? (?)	? (?)	? (?)	89 (280)
8	(Russia) Roman Pavlyuchenko	2003–2008	69 (141)	4 (17)	14 (28)	2 (3)	89 (189)
10	(Soviet Union) Anatoli Ilyin	1949–1962	83 (224)	? (?)	? (?)	? (?)	83 (224)
11	(Soviet Union) Yury Sevidov	1960–1965	71 (146)	? (?)	? (?)	? (?)	71 (146)
12	(Russia) Vladimir Beschastnykh	1991–1994; 2001–2002	56 (104)	6 (11)	5 (28)	(-)	67 (143)
13	(Soviet Union) Sergei Salnikov	1942–1943; 1946–1949; 1955–1960	64 (201)	? (?)	? (?)	? (?)	64 (201)
14	(Soviet Union) Aleksei Paramonov	1947–1959	63 (264)	? (?)	? (?)	? (?)	63 (264)
15	(Brazil) Welliton	2007–2014	57 (126)	2 (6)	1 (15)	(-)	60 (147)
16	(Soviet Union) Georgi Yartsev	1977–1980	55 (116)	? (?)	? (?)	? (?)	55 (116)
17	(Soviet Union) Anatoli Isayev	1953–1962	54 (159)	? (?)	? (?)	? (?)	54 (159)
17	(Soviet Union) Valeri Shmarov	1987–1991	54 (143)	? (?)	? (?)	? (?)	54 (143)
19	(Soviet Union) Nikolai Osyanin	1966–1971; 1974–1976	50 (248)	? (?)	? (?)	? (?)	50 (248)

== Nickname ==
The team is usually called "red-and-whites," but among the fans "The Meat" (Russian: "Мясо", "Myaso") is a very popular nickname. The origins of the nickname belong to the days of the foundation of the club; in the 1920s, the team was renamed several times, from "Moscow Sports Club" to "Red Presnya" (after the name of one of the districts of Moscow) to "Pishcheviki" ("Food industry workers") to "Promkooperatsiya" ("Industrial cooperation") and finally to "Spartak Moscow" in 1935, and for many years the team was under patronage of one of the Moscow food factories that dealt with meat products.

One of the most popular slogans among both fans and players is: "Who are we? We're The Meat!" (Russian: "Кто мы? Мясо!", "Kto my? Myaso!")

== Ownerships, kits and crests ==
FC Spartak Moscow's main colour is red. In 2014, Nike unveiled kit inspired by the club's new home.

=== Owners, kit suppliers and shirt sponsors ===
Period	Kit supplier	Shirt sponsor	Owner
1979–1987	Adidas	—	Spartak society
1988	Adidas	Danieli	Spartak society
1989	Adidas	JINDO	Spartak society
1990–1993	Adidas	Unipack	Spartak society
1994–1996	Adidas	Urengoygazprom	Oleg Romantsev
1997–1998	Adidas	Akai	Oleg Romantsev
1999	Adidas	—	Oleg Romantsev
2000–2002	Adidas	Lukoil	Andrey Chervichenko
2003–2004	Umbro	Lukoil	Leonid Fedun
2005–2023	Nike	Lukoil	Leonid Fedun
2023–2024	Wildberries	Lukoil	Lukoil
2024–present	Jögel	Lukoil	Lukoil

== Rival teams and friendships ==
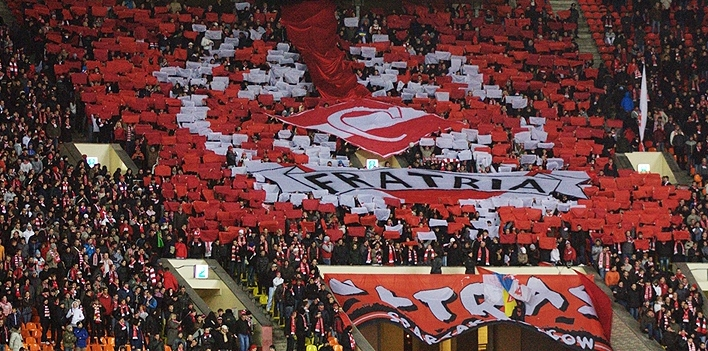
Spartak supporters

At present, Spartak's archrival is CSKA Moscow, although this is a relatively recent rivalry that has only emerged after the collapse of the USSR. Seven of ten matches with the largest audience in Russian Premier League (including top three) were Spartak-CSKA derbies. Historically, the most celebrated rivalry is with Dynamo Moscow, a fiercely contested matchup which is Russia's oldest derby. Matches against Lokomotiv Moscow and Zenit Saint Petersburg attract thousands of people as well, almost always resulting in packed stadia. Upon the collapse of the Soviet Union, Spartak's rivalry with Dynamo Kyiv, one of the leaders of the USSR championship, was lost. Since Dynamo Kyiv now plays in the Ukrainian Premier League, both teams must qualify for UEFA tournaments to meet each other.

Since the mid-2000s the supporters of Spartak maintain brotherhood relations with Crvena Zvezda (Red Star Belgrade) and Olympiacos ultras – a friendship based on common Orthodox faith and same club colours. Also fans of Spartak have generally friendly relationships with Torpedo Moscow supporters, and of supporters of Polish club Lech Poznań.

== Stadium ==
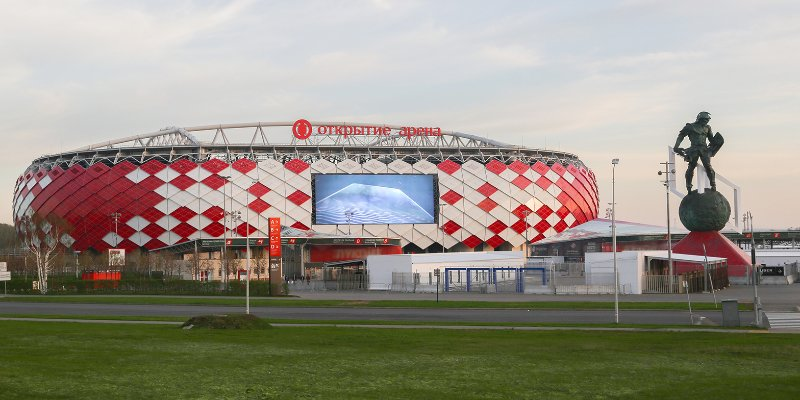
Lukoil Arena

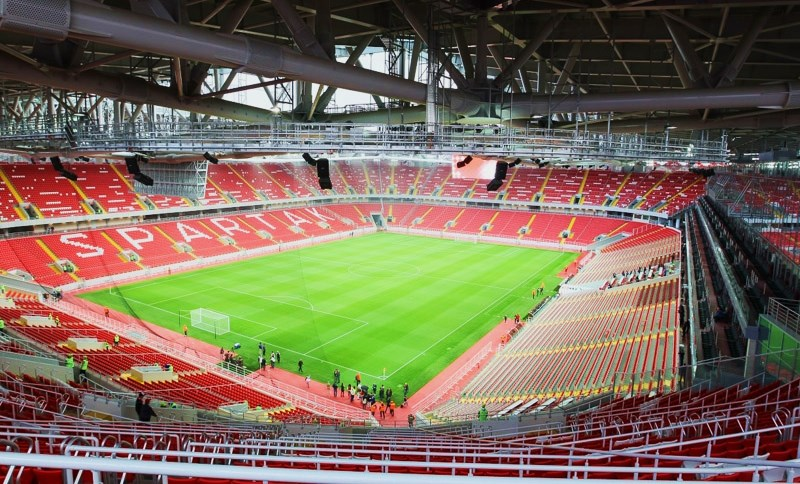
Interior view

Until 2014, Spartak had never had its own stadium, with the team historically playing in various Moscow stadia throughout its history, even once playing an exhibition match in Red Square. The team played home games at various Moscow stadiums, especially the Locomotiv and Luzhniki stadiums. After the purchase of the club by Andrei Chervichenko in the early 2000s, several statements were made about the speedy construction of the stadium, but construction did not begin.

After a controlling stake in the club was bought by Leonid Fedun, real steps were taken to promote the stadium project, and in 2006, the Government of Moscow allocated land at Tushino Aeropol at a size of 28.3 hectares for the construction of the stadium. The project involved the main arena of 42,000 people with natural lawn, sports, and an entertainment hall for tennis, handball, basketball and volleyball for 12,000 spectators. The ceremony of laying the first stone took place on 2 June 2007.

In February 2013, it was announced that as a result of a sponsorship deal with Otkritie FC Bank ("Discovery"), the stadium will be called Otkritie Arena for 6 years. The opening match at the new stadium took place on 5 September 2014, when Spartak drew with the Serbian side Red Star Belgrade (1-1). The first competitive match took place on 14 September 2014, in which Spartak defeated Torpedo Moscow 3–1 in the 7th round of the championship. It is now known as the Lukoil Arena.

== Players ==
=== Current squad ===
As of 10 September 2026

Note: Flags indicate national team as defined under FIFA eligibility rules; some limited exceptions apply. Players may hold more than one non-FIFA nationality.

No.	Pos.	Nation	Player
1	GK	RUS	Ilya Pomazun
3	DF	CMR	Christopher Wooh
4	DF	GHA	Alexander Djiku
5	MF	ARG	Esequiel Barco
6	DF	SRB	Srđan Babić
7	MF	ARG	Pablo Solari
9	FW	CRC	Manfred Ugalde
10	MF	BRA	Marquinhos
17	MF	RUS	Vladislav Saus
18	MF	RUS	Nail Umyarov
19	FW	ALB	Mirlind Daku
24	MF	RUS	Nikita Massalyga
25	MF	RUS	Danil Prutsev
27	MF	RUS	Igor Dmitriyev

No.	Pos.	Nation	Player
28	MF	RUS	Daniil Zorin
33	DF	ESP	Víctor Parada
35	MF	LUX	Christopher Martins
40	MF	RUS	Ivan Sorokin
47	MF	RUS	Roman Zobnin
56	GK	RUS	Aleksandr Dovbnya
62	FW	RUS	Pavel Polekh
68	DF	RUS	Ruslan Litvinov
71	DF	RUS	Aleksandr Dobroditsky
77	MF	RUS	Anton Zinkovsky
83	MF	POR	Gedson Fernandes
84	FW	RUS	Artyom Bykovsky
97	DF	RUS	Daniil Denisov
98	GK	RUS	Aleksandr Maksimenko

=== Out on loan ===
Note: Flags indicate national team as defined under FIFA eligibility rules; some limited exceptions apply. Players may hold more than one non-FIFA nationality.

No.	Pos.	Nation	Player
—	DF	RUS	Yegor Guziyev (at Tekstilshchik Ivanovo until 30 June 2027)
—	DF	RUS	Ilya Samoshnikov (at Rubin Kazan until 30 June 2027)
—	FW	TTO	Levi García (at Panathinaikos until 30 June 2027)

=== Notable players ===
Had international caps for their respective countries, or held any club record. Players whose name is listed in bold represented their countries while playing for Spartak. For further list, see List of FC Spartak Moscow players.

Russia/USSR

- (Russia) **Dmitri Alenichev**
- (Russia) **Dmitri Ananko**
- (Russia) Ari
- (Russia) **Zelimkhan Bakayev**
- (Russia) **Nikita Bazhenov**
- (Russia) **Vladimir Beschastnykh**
- (Russia) **Artyom Bezrodny**
- (Russia) **Diniyar Bilyaletdinov**
- (Russia) **Denis Boyarintsev**
- (Russia) **Viktor Bulatov**
- (Russia) **Yevgeni Bushmanov**
- (Russia) **Maksim Buznikin**
- (Russia) **Vladimir Bystrov**
- (Russia) (Commonwealth of Independent States) (Soviet Union) **Stanislav Cherchesov**
- (Russia) Nikita Chernov
- (Russia) (Soviet Union) **Andrey Chernyshov**
- (Russia) Valery Chizhov
- (Russia) **Denis Davydov**
- (Russia) **Daniil Denisov**
- (Russia) Maksim Demenko
- (Russia) Soslan Dzhanayev
- (Russia) **Georgi Dzhikiya**
- (Russia) **Artyom Dzyuba**
- (Russia) **Vadim Evseev**
- (Russia) **Aleksandr Filimonov**
- (Russia) **Denis Glushakov**
- (Russia) Maksim Glushenkov
- (Russia) (Soviet Union) **Sergei Gorlukovich**
- (Russia) Vladimir Granat
- (Russia) Maksim Grigoryev
- (Russia) Oleg Ivanov
- (Russia) (Commonwealth of Independent States) **Valeri Karpin**
- (Russia) **Valery Kechinov**
- (Russia) Zaur Khapov
- (Russia) (Commonwealth of Independent States) **Dmitri Khlestov**
- (Russia) **Daniil Khlusevich**
- (Russia) Aleksandr Kokorin
- (Russia) **Dmitri Kombarov**
- (Russia) Aleksey Kosolapov
- (Russia) **Yuri Kovtun**
- (Russia) Fyodor Kudryashov
- (Russia) (Commonwealth of Independent States) (Soviet Union) **Vasili Kulkov**
- (Russia) **Ilya Kutepov**
- (Russia) Oleg Kuzmin
- (Russia) (Commonwealth of Independent States) **Igor Lediakhov**
- (Russia) **Ruslan Litvinov**
- (Russia) **Yevgeni Makeyev**
- (Russia) **Aleksandr Maksimenko**
- (Russia) **Ramiz Mamedov**
- (Russia) Georgi Melkadze
- (Russia) Anton Mitryushkin
- (Russia) (Commonwealth of Independent States) (Soviet Union) **Aleksandr Mostovoi**
- (Russia) (Tajikistan) **Mukhsin Mukhamadiev**
- (Russia) Ruslan Nigmatullin
- (Russia) (Ukraine) (Commonwealth of Independent States) **Yuri Nikiforov**
- (Russia) (Commonwealth of Independent States) **Viktor Onopko**
- (Russia) **Sergei Parshivlyuk**
- (Russia) **Roman Pavlyuchenko**
- (Russia) Sergei Pesyakov
- (Russia) **Nikolai Pisarev**
- (Russia) Pavel Pogrebnyak
- (Russia) Ilya Pomazun
- (Russia) **Dmitri Popov**
- (Russia) **Danil Prutsev**
- (Russia) (Commonwealth of Independent States) **Andrey Pyatnitsky**
- (Russia) (Soviet Union) **Dmitri Radchenko**
- (Russia) (Tajikistan) **Rashid Rakhimov**
- (Russia) Aleksei Rebko
- (Russia) **Artyom Rebrov**
- (Russia) **Ivan Saenko**
- (Russia) **Aleksandr Samedov**
- (Russia) **Ilya Samoshnikov**
- (Russia) **Aleksandr Selikhov**
- (Russia) (Commonwealth of Independent States) (Soviet Union) **Igor Shalimov**
- (Russia) **Aleksandr Sheshukov**
- (Russia) **Aleksandr Shirko**
- (Russia) **Roman Shirokov**
- (Russia) **Roman Shishkin**
- (Russia) **Aleksandr Sobolev**
- (Russia) **Dmitri Sychev**
- (Russia) **Vladislav Ternavsky**
- (Russia) **Andrey Tikhonov**
- (Russia) **Yegor Titov**
- (Russia) **Dmitri Torbinski**
- (Russia) (Ukraine) **Ilia Tsymbalar**
- (Russia) **Nail Umyarov**
- (Russia) Andrey Yeshchenko
- (Russia) (Commonwealth of Independent States) (Soviet Union) **Sergei Yuran**
- (Russia) Anton Zabolotny
- (Russia) **Anton Zinkovsky**
- (Russia) **Roman Zobnin**
- (Soviet Union) **Nikolay Abramov**
- (Soviet Union) Vsevolod Bobrov
- (Soviet Union) **Aleksandr Bubnov**
- (Soviet Union) **Fyodor Cherenkov**
- (Soviet Union) **Rinat Dasayev**
- (Soviet Union) **Yuri Gavrilov**
- (Soviet Union) **Anatoli Ilyin**
- (Soviet Union) **Anatoli Isayev**
- (Soviet Union) **Valentin Ivakin**
- (Soviet Union) **Vagiz Khidiyatullin**
- (Soviet Union) **Galimzyan Khusainov**
- (Soviet Union) **Anatoly Krutikov**
- (Soviet Union) **Gennady Logofet**
- (Soviet Union) **Evgenii Lovchev**
- (Soviet Union) Eduard Malofeyev
- (Soviet Union) Vladimir Maslachenko
- (Soviet Union) **Anatoli Maslyonkin**
- (Soviet Union) **Alexander Mirzoyan**
- (Soviet Union) **Gennady Morozov**
- (Soviet Union) **Igor Netto**
- (Soviet Union) **Aleksei Paramonov**
- (Soviet Union) **Viktor Pasulko**
- (Soviet Union) **Gennady Perepadenko**
- (Soviet Union) **Sergey Rodionov**
- (Soviet Union) **Oleg Romantsev**
- (Soviet Union) **Sergey Shavlo**
- (Soviet Union) **Valeri Shmarov**
- (Soviet Union) **Nikita Simonyan**
- (Soviet Union) Yuri Susloparov
- (Soviet Union) **Georgi Yartsev**

Europe

- (Albania) (Kosovo) Mirlind Daku
- (Armenia) **Yura Movsisyan**
- (Armenia) Aghvan Papikyan
- (Armenia) **Aras Özbiliz**
- (Austria) **Emanuel Pogatetz**
- (Austria) **Martin Stranzl**
- (Azerbaijan) Vali Gasimov
- (Azerbaijan) Emin Makhmudov
- (Azerbaijan) (Croatia) Filip Ozobić
- (Belarus) **Vasili Baranov**
- (Belarus) **Yegor Filipenko**
- (Belarus) Artem Kontsevoy
- (Belarus) **Miroslav Romaschenko**
- (Belarus) Konstantin Kovalenko
- (Belarus) **Raman Vasilyuk**
- (Belarus) Valery Vyalichka
- (Bulgaria) **Ivelin Popov**
- (Croatia) Danijel Hrman
- (Croatia) **Mario Pašalić**
- (Croatia) **Stipe Pletikosa**
- (Croatia) **Ognjen Vukojević**
- (Czech Republic) **Martin Jiránek**
- (Czech Republic) **Radoslav Kováč**
- (Czech Republic) **Alex Král**
- (Czech Republic) **Marek Suchý**
- (Estonia) **Tarmo Kink**
- (Finland) Roman Eremenko
- (Georgia (country)) **Valeri Abramidze**
- (Georgia (country)) **Jano Ananidze**
- (Georgia (country)) Otar Khizaneishvili
- (Georgia (country)) **Giorgi Lomaia**
- (Georgia (country)) Kakhaber Mzhavanadze
- (Georgia (country)) (Commonwealth of Independent States) **Kakhaber Tskhadadze**
- (Germany) Malik Fathi
- (Germany) André Schürrle
- (Germany) Serdar Tasci
- (Hungary) Szabolcs Sáfár
- (Republic of Ireland) **Aiden McGeady**
- (Italy) Salvatore Bocchetti
- (Latvia) **Andrejs Rubins**
- (Latvia) **Andrejs Štolcers**
- (Lithuania) **Ignas Dedura**
- (Lithuania) **Gintaras Staučė**
- (Luxembourg) **Christopher Martins**
- (North Macedonia) **Goran Maznov**
- (North Macedonia) **Igor Mitreski**
- (Moldova) **Serghei Covalciuc**
- (Moldova) Alexandru Gațcan
- (Moldova) **Oleg Reabciuk**
- (Montenegro) Nikola Drinčić
- (Netherlands) Jorrit Hendrix
- (Netherlands) **Quincy Promes**
- (Netherlands) Guus Til
- (Netherlands) Demy de Zeeuw
- (Poland) Bolesław Habowski
- (Poland) **Wojciech Kowalewski**
- (Poland) Maciej Rybus
- (Portugal) Gedson Fernandes
- (Romania) **Adrian Iencsi**
- (Romania) **Florin Şoavă**
- (Romania) **Gabriel Tamaş**
- (Serbia) **Srđan Babić**
- (Serbia) **Nikola Maksimović**
- (Serbia) Marko Petković
- (Serbia) (Serbia and Montenegro) **Nemanja Vidić**
- (Serbia and Montenegro) **Dušan Petković**
- (Serbia and Montenegro) Mihajlo Pjanović
- (Serbia and Montenegro) **Goran Trobok**
- (Slovenia) **Miha Mevlja**
- (Sweden) **Kim Källström**
- (Sweden) **Jordan Larsson**
- (Ukraine) **Andriy Dykan**
- (Ukraine) **Oleksandr Hranovskyi**
- (Ukraine) **Maksym Kalynychenko**
- (Ukraine) **Oleh Naduda**
- (Ukraine) **Serhiy Nahornyak**
- (Ukraine) **Maksym Levytskyi**
- (Ukraine) **Dmytro Parfenov**
- (Ukraine) Serhiy Pohodin
- (Ukraine) Oleksandr Pomazun
- (Ukraine) Yuriy Sak
- (Ukraine) Eduard Tsykhmeystruk
- (Ukraine) **Dmytro Tyapushkin**
- (Ukraine) **Vladyslav Vashchuk**

South and Central America

- (Argentina) Fernando Cavenaghi
- (Argentina) Tino Costa
- (Argentina) Juan Insaurralde
- (Argentina) **Nicolás Pareja**
- (Argentina) **Clemente Rodríguez**
- (Argentina) **Marcos Rojo**
- (Brazil) Luiz Adriano
- (Brazil) **Alex**
- (Brazil) Ayrton
- (Brazil) Alexandre Lopes
- (Brazil) Fernando
- (Brazil) **Rômulo**
- (Brazil) Russo
- (Costa Rica) **Manfred Ugalde**
- (Jamaica) **Shamar Nicholson**
- (Jamaica) **Robert Scarlett**
- (Paraguay) Lucas Barrios
- (Paraguay) Jesús Medina
- (Paraguay) **Lorenzo Melgarejo**
- (Suriname) **Myenty Abena**
- (Trinidad and Tobago) **Levi García**
- (United States) Adam Wolanin

Africa

- (Cameroon) **Jerry-Christian Tchuissé**
- (Cameroon) **Christopher Wooh**
- (Cape Verde) **Zé Luís**
- (Democratic Republic of the Congo) **Théo Bongonda**
- (Ghana) Lawrence Adjei
- (Ghana) **Alexander Djiku**
- (Ghana) **Waris Majeed**
- (Ghana) **Quincy Owusu-Abeyie**
- (Morocco) Abdelillah Bagui
- (Liberia) **Sylvanus Nimely**
- (Nigeria) **Emmanuel Emenike**
- (Nigeria) Victor Moses
- (Senegal) Keita Baldé
- (Senegal) **Ali Ibra Kebe**
- (Zambia) **Fashion Sakala**

Asia

- (Uzbekistan) **Jafar Irismetov**
- (Uzbekistan) Oston Urunov

== Staff ==
- Owner: (Russia) Vagit Alekperov, (Russia) Leonid Fedun
- Managing Director: (Russia) Yevgeni Melezhikov
- Director of Sports: Francis Cagigao
- Caretaker head coach: (Bosnia and Herzegovina) Vladimir Slišković
- Assistant coach: (Spain) Carlos Valle
- Goalkeeping coach: (Russia) Vasili Kuznetsov
- Physical coach: (Spain) Fernando Perez Lopez
- Reserves team head coach: (Russia) Aleksei Lunin
- Reserves team assistant coach: (Russia) Aleksei Melyoshin
- Reserves team goalkeeping coach: (Russia) Vasili Kuznetsov

== Coaches ==
Name	Period
(First Czechoslovak Republic) Antonin Fivebr	1936
(Soviet Union) Mikhail Kozlov	Aug 1936–37
(Soviet Union) Konstantin Kvashnin	1937 – Sept 38
(Soviet Union) Pyotr Popov	Sept 1938–39
(Soviet Union) Vladimir Gorokhov	1940
(Soviet Union) Pyotr Popov	1941
(Soviet Union) Vladimir Gorokhov	1942–43
(Soviet Union) Konstantin Kvashnin	1944
(Soviet Union) Pyotr Isakov	Jan 1945 – Aug 45 (caretaker)
(Soviet Union) Albert Vollrat	Sept 1945–47
(Soviet Union) Konstantin Kvashnin	1948
(Soviet Union) Abram Dangulov	1949 – May 51
(Soviet Union) Georgi Glazkov	June 1951 – Dec 51
(Soviet Union) Vasily Sokolov	1952–54
(Soviet Union) Nikolay Gulyaev	1955–59
(Soviet Union) Nikita Simonyan	1 January 1960 – 31 December 1965
(Soviet Union) Nikolay Gulyaev	1966
(Soviet Union) Sergei Salnikov	Jan 1967 – July 67
(Soviet Union) Nikita Simonyan	1 July 1967 – 31 December 1972
(Soviet Union) Nikolay Gulyaev	1973–75
(Soviet Union) Anatoly Krutikov	1976
(Soviet Union) Konstantin Beskov	1 January 1977 – 31 December 1988
(Soviet Union) (Russia) Oleg Romantsev	1 January 1989 – 31 December 1995
(Russia) Georgi Yartsev	1 January 1996 – 31 December 1996
(Russia) Oleg Romantsev	1 January 1997 – 3 May 2003
(Russia) Andrei Chernyshov	19 June 2003 – 1 September 2003

Name	Period
(Russia) Vladimir Fedotov	2 September 2003 – 30 November 2003 (caretaker)
(Italy) Nevio Scala	10 December 2003 – 15 September 2004
(Latvia) Aleksandrs Starkovs	10 October 2004 – 26 April 2006
(Russia) Vladimir Fedotov	1 June 2006 – 19 June 2007
(Russia) Stanislav Cherchesov	1 July 2007 – 14 August 2008
(Russia) Igor Lediakhov	15 August 2008 – 12 September 2008 (caretaker)
(Denmark) Michael Laudrup	9 September 2008 – 15 April 2009
(Russia) Valeri Karpin	16 April 2009 – 30 June 2012
(Spain) Unai Emery	1 July 2012 – 25 November 2012
(Russia) Valeri Karpin	26 November 2012 – 18 March 2014
(Russia) Dmitri Gunko	18 March 2014 – 31 May 2014
(Switzerland) Murat Yakin	16 June 2014 – 30 May 2015
(Russia) Dmitri Alenichev	10 June 2015 – 5 August 2016
(Italy) Massimo Carrera	5 August 2016 – 22 October 2018
(Spain) Raúl Riancho	22 October 2018 – 12 November 2018 (caretaker)
(Russia) Oleg Kononov	12 November 2018 – 29 September 2019
(Hungary) Serhiy Kuznetsov	29 September 2019 – 14 October 2019 (caretaker)
(Italy) Domenico Tedesco	14 October 2019 – 17 May 2021
(Portugal) Rui Vitória	24 May 2021 – 15 December 2021
(Italy) Paolo Vanoli	17 December 2021 – 9 June 2022
(Spain) Guille Abascal	10 June 2022 – 14 April 2024
(Bosnia and Herzegovina) Vladimir Slišković	14 April 2024 – 30 May 2024 (caretaker)
(Serbia) Dejan Stanković	01 June 2024 – present
