= 1967 in Soviet football =

Football in the Soviet Union
- Season: 1967

Men's football
- Class A 1. Group: Dinamo Kiev
- Class A 2. Group: Dinamo Kirovobad
- Class B: Dinamo Makhachkala (Russia); Avtomobilist Zhitomir (Ukraine); Neman Grodno (Union republics); Zarafshan Navoi (Central Asia)
- Soviet Cup: Dinamo Moscow

The 1967 Soviet football championship was the 35th seasons of competitive football in the Soviet Union and the 29th among teams of sports societies and factories. Dinamo Kiev won the championship becoming the Soviet domestic champions for the third time and the third team to do it back-to-back.

== Honours ==
Competition	Winner	Runner-up
Class A 1. Group	Dinamo Kiev (3)	Dinamo Moscow
Class A 2. Group	Dinamo Kirovobad (1)	Shakhter Karaganda
Class B	Dinamo Makhachkala (Russia)	Volga Ulyanovsk (Russia)
Class B	Avtomobilist Zhitomir (Ukraine)	Khimik Sieverodonetsk (Ukraine)
Class B	Neman Grodno (Union republics)	Polad Sumgait (Union republics)
Class B	Zarafshan Navoí (Central Asia)	Sverdlovets Tashkent Oblast (Central Asia)
Soviet Cup	Dinamo Moscow (3)	CSKA Moscow

Notes = Number in parentheses is the times that club has won that honour. * indicates new record for competition

== Soviet Union football championship ==
=== Class A First Group ===
Pos	Team	Pld	W	D	L	GF	GA	GD	Pts	Qualification
1	(Ukrainian Soviet Socialist Republic) Dynamo Kyiv (C)	36	21	12	3	51	11	+40	54	Qualification for European Cup first round
2	(Russian Soviet Federative Socialist Republic) Dynamo Moscow	36	18	13	5	55	28	+27	49	Qualification for Cup Winners' Cup first round
3	(Georgian Soviet Socialist Republic) Dinamo Tbilisi	36	16	13	7	53	33	+20	45	
4	(Byelorussian Soviet Socialist Republic) Dinamo Minsk	36	13	17	6	47	31	+16	43	
5	(Azerbaijan Soviet Socialist Republic) Neftyanik Baku	36	16	10	10	51	33	+18	42	
6	(Ukrainian Soviet Socialist Republic) Shakhtar Donetsk	36	13	16	7	43	38	+5	42	
7	(Russian Soviet Federative Socialist Republic) Spartak Moscow	36	13	14	9	38	30	+8	40	
8	(Armenian Soviet Socialist Republic) Ararat Yerevan	36	13	10	13	40	38	+2	36	
9	(Russian Soviet Federative Socialist Republic) CSKA Moscow	36	12	12	12	35	35	0	36	
10	(Russian Soviet Federative Socialist Republic) SKA Rostov-on-Don	36	13	8	15	39	42	−3	34	
11	(Russian Soviet Federative Socialist Republic) Krylya Sovetov Kuybyshev	36	8	18	10	23	28	−5	34	
12	(Russian Soviet Federative Socialist Republic) Torpedo Moscow	36	12	9	15	38	47	−9	33	
13	(Georgian Soviet Socialist Republic) Torpedo Kutaisi	36	8	15	13	37	50	−13	31	
14	(Kazakh Soviet Socialist Republic) Kairat Alma-Ata	36	10	11	15	27	47	−20	31	
15	(Uzbek Soviet Socialist Republic) Pakhtakor Tashkent	36	5	19	12	31	42	−11	29	
16	(Ukrainian Soviet Socialist Republic) Zarya Luhansk	36	8	13	15	27	42	−15	29	
17	(Russian Soviet Federative Socialist Republic) Lokomotiv Moscow	36	7	14	15	33	37	−4	28	
18	(Ukrainian Soviet Socialist Republic) Chornomorets Odessa	36	8	11	17	25	46	−21	27	
19	(Russian Soviet Federative Socialist Republic) Zenit Leningrad	36	6	9	21	28	63	−35	21	

Source: rsssf.com
(C) Champions

=== Class A Second Group finals ===
==== For places 1-3 ====
[Oct 27 – Nov 16]

Pos	Rep	Team	Pld	W	D	L	GF	GA	GD	Pts
1	AZE	Dinamo Kirovabad	4	2	1	1	4	3	+1	5
1	KAZ	Shakhtyor Karaganda	4	2	1	1	4	2	+2	5
3	UKR	SKA Kiev	4	0	2	2	3	6	−3	2

Additional Final

[Nov 21, Tashkent]

- Dinamo Kirovabad 1-0 Shakhtyor Karaganda
- Dinamo Kirovabad promoted.

==== For places 4-6 ====
[Oct 27 – Nov 16]

Pos	Rep	Team	Pld	W	D	L	GF	GA	GD	Pts
4	UKR	Metallurg Zaporozhye	4	1	3	0	3	2	+1	5
5	RUS	UralMash Sverdlovsk	4	1	2	1	1	4	−3	4
6	LVA	Daugava Riga	4	1	1	2	6	4	+2	3

Source: rsssf.com

=== Final group ===
[Nov 5-25, Makhachkala, Astrakhan]

Pos	Team	Pld	W	D	L	GF	GA	GD	Pts
1	Dinamo Makhachkala	7	5	2	0	15	5	+10	12
2	Volga Ulyanovsk	7	4	1	2	11	7	+4	9
3	Volgar Astrakhan	7	4	1	2	8	7	+1	9
4	Spartak Yoshkar-Ola	7	4	1	2	6	6	0	9
5	Zenit Izhevsk	7	2	2	3	12	13	−1	6
6	Metallurg Lipetsk	7	1	4	2	7	8	−1	6
7	SKA Chita	7	1	1	5	8	12	−4	3
8	Spartak Kislovodsk	7	0	2	5	2	11	−9	2

==== Ukraine finals ====
[Oct 24 – Nov 2, Severodonetsk, Kadiyevka]

Pos	Team	Pld	W	D	L	GF	GA	GD	Pts
1	Avtomobilist Zhitomir	5	4	1	0	7	2	+5	9
2	Khimik Severodonetsk	5	3	2	0	11	3	+8	8
3	Dnepr Kremenchug	5	2	1	2	2	2	0	5
4	Torpedo Kharkov	5	2	0	3	3	6	−3	4
5	Shakhtyor Kadiyevka	5	1	0	4	3	7	−4	2
6	Dnepr Cherkassy	5	1	0	4	4	10	−6	2

==== Union republics finals ====
[Nov 5, Chernigov]
Neman Grodno  1-0  Polad Sumgait

==== Central Asia and Kazakhstan ====
Pos	Rep	Team	Pld	W	D	L	GF	GA	GD	Pts
1	UZB	Zarafshan Navoi	42	30	9	3	96	34	+62	69
2	UZB	Sverdlovets Tashkent Region	42	27	11	4	67	24	+43	65
3	KAZ	Metallurg Temirtau	42	20	14	8	51	31	+20	54
4	UZB	Sogdiana Samarkand (Note: Spartak Samarkand changed name to Sogdiana.)	42	17	17	8	40	32	+8	51
5	KAZ	Dinamo Tselinograd	42	17	14	11	57	46	+11	48
6	KAZ	ADK Alma-Ata	42	17	12	13	55	36	+19	46
7	KAZ	Metallurg Chimkent	42	16	14	12	51	44	+7	46
8	UZB	Pahtaaral Gulistan	42	18	10	14	45	43	+2	46
9	TJK	Vakhsh Nurek	42	18	9	15	51	47	+4	45
10	UZB	Ok-Oltyn Andizhan Region	42	17	11	14	44	50	−6	45
11	UZB	Spartak Andizhan	42	13	17	12	44	37	+7	43
12	KGZ	Alay Osh (Note: Shakhtyor Osh changed name to Alay.)	42	16	10	16	38	42	−4	42
13	UZB	Khimik Chirchik	42	13	12	17	41	36	+5	38
14	UZB	Akkurgan Tashkent Region (Note: Dimitrovets Tashkent Region changed name to Akkurgan.)	42	13	12	17	53	61	−8	38
15	UZB	Tselinnik Yangiyer	42	9	18	15	35	50	−15	36
16	TKM	Zahmet Charjou	42	12	11	19	40	49	−9	35
17	TJK	Pahtakor Kurgan-Tyube	42	11	13	18	32	54	−22	35
18	KAZ	Yenbek Jezkazgan	42	10	13	19	29	49	−20	33
19	UZB	Metallurg Almalyk	42	9	13	20	40	58	−18	31
20	KAZ	Voskhod Jambul (Note: Metallist Jambul changed name to Voskhod.)	42	9	11	22	36	57	−21	29
21	TKM	Murgab Mary	42	8	10	24	29	67	−38	26
22	UZB	Fakel Buhara (Note: Buhoro Buhara changed name to Fakel.)	42	9	7	26	29	56	−27	25

Source: rsssf.com

=== Top goalscorers ===
Class A First Group

- Mikhail Mustygin (Dinamo Minsk) – 19 goals
