= 1955 in Soviet football =

Football in the Soviet Union
- Season: 1955

Men's football
- Class A: Dinamo Moscow
- Class B: Burevestnik Kishinev (Group I); ODO Sverdlovsk (Group II)
- Soviet Cup: CDSA Moscow

The 1955 Soviet football championship was the 23rd seasons of competitive football in the Soviet Union and the 17th among teams of sports societies and factories. Dinamo Moscow won the championship becoming the Soviet domestic champions for the seventh time.

== Honours ==
Competition	Winner	Runner-up
Class A	Dinamo Moscow (7*)	Spartak Moscow
Class B	Burevestnik Kishinev (Group I)	Spartak Kalinin (Group I)
Class B	ODO Sverdlovsk (Group II)	Spartak Yerevan (Group II)
Soviet Cup	CDSA Moscow (4)	Dinamo Moscow

Notes = Number in parentheses is the times that club has won that honour. * indicates new record for competition

== Soviet Union football championship ==
=== Class A ===
Pos	Team	Pld	W	D	L	GF	GA	GD	Pts	Qualification
1	(Russian Soviet Federative Socialist Republic) Dynamo Moscow (C)	22	15	4	3	52	16	+36	34	League champions
2	(Russian Soviet Federative Socialist Republic) Spartak Moscow	22	15	3	4	55	27	+28	33	
3	(Russian Soviet Federative Socialist Republic) CDSA Moscow	22	12	7	3	35	20	+15	31	
4	(Russian Soviet Federative Socialist Republic) Torpedo Moscow	22	10	8	4	39	32	+7	28	
5	(Russian Soviet Federative Socialist Republic) Lokomotiv Moscow	22	9	7	6	32	27	+5	25	
6	(Ukrainian Soviet Socialist Republic) Dynamo Kiev	22	8	6	8	31	37	−6	22	
7	(Ukrainian Soviet Socialist Republic) Shakhtyor Stalino	22	4	10	8	23	34	−11	18	
8	(Russian Soviet Federative Socialist Republic) Zenit Leningrad	22	5	8	9	23	36	−13	18	
9	(Georgian Soviet Socialist Republic) Dynamo Tbilisi	22	6	4	12	25	36	−11	16	
10	(Russian Soviet Federative Socialist Republic) Trudovyye Rezervy Leningrad	22	5	6	11	28	41	−13	16	
11	(Russian Soviet Federative Socialist Republic) Krylia Sovetov Kuybyshev (R)	22	4	5	13	21	39	−18	13	Relegation to Class B
12	(Byelorussian Soviet Socialist Republic) Spartak Minsk (R)	22	2	6	14	13	32	−19	10	Relegation to Class B

Source: rsssf.com
(C) Champions; (R) Relegated

=== Class B ===
==== Group I ====
Pos	Rep	Team	Pld	W	D	L	GF	GA	GD	Pts	Promotion
1	MDA	Burevestnik Kishinev	30	20	6	4	86	46	+40	46	Promoted
2	RUS	Spartak Kalinin	30	16	5	9	48	31	+17	37	
3	UKR	ODO Kiev	30	14	8	8	44	27	+17	36	
4	LTU	Spartak Vilnius	30	13	10	7	40	29	+11	36	
5	RUS	Krasnoye Znamya Ivanovo	30	13	10	7	43	33	+10	36	
6	RUS	Krylya Sovetov Stupino	30	13	6	11	48	35	+13	32	
7	UKR	ODO Lvov	30	13	6	11	47	40	+7	32	
8	UKR	Metallurg Zaporozhye	30	13	6	11	37	33	+4	32	
9	UKR	Lokomotiv Kharkov	30	12	6	12	48	34	+14	30	
10	UKR	Metallurg Dnepropetrovsk	30	14	2	14	53	47	+6	30	
11	RUS	Shakhtyor Stalinogorsk (Note: Shakhtyor Mosbass relocated to Stalinogorsk.)	30	10	9	11	34	38	−4	29	
12	UKR	Pishchevik Odessa (Note: Pishchevik Odessa was called Metallurg.)	30	11	5	14	39	47	−8	27	
13	UKR	Spartak Uzhgorod	30	8	9	13	33	40	−7	25	
14	LVA	Daugava Riga	30	6	10	14	29	57	−28	22	
15	UKR	DOF Sevastopol	30	7	6	17	25	61	−36	20	
16	EST	Dinamo Tallinn	30	2	6	22	22	78	−56	10	

Source: rsssf.com

==== Group II ====
Pos	Rep	Team	Pld	W	D	L	GF	GA	GD	Pts	Promotion
1	RUS	ODO Sverdlovsk	30	20	5	5	56	23	+33	45	Promoted
2	ARM	Spartak Yerevan	30	18	6	6	44	17	+27	42	
3	GEO	ODO Tbilisi	30	18	5	7	61	32	+29	41	
4	RUS	Torpedo Gorkiy	30	17	6	7	53	28	+25	40	
5	RUS	Neftyanik Krasnodar	30	17	4	9	60	39	+21	38	
6	AZE	Neftyanik Baku	30	12	9	9	48	44	+4	33	
7	RUS	Krylya Sovetov Voronezh	30	12	9	9	37	37	0	33	
8	RUS	Zenit Kaliningrad (M.R.)	30	9	10	11	24	29	−5	28	
9	RUS	Torpedo Rostov-na-Donu	30	9	9	12	35	52	−17	27	
10	KAZ	Urozhai Alma-Ata (Note: Urozhai Alma-Ata was called Lokomotiv.)	30	7	12	11	24	32	−8	26	
11	RUS	Krylya Sovetov Molotov	30	8	9	13	24	41	−17	25	
12	RUS	Avangard Sverdlovsk	30	8	6	16	40	49	−9	22	
13	RUS	Avangard Chelyabinsk	30	8	6	16	28	52	−24	22	
14	UZB	Spartak Tashkent	30	6	9	15	26	44	−18	21	
15	RUS	Torpedo Stalingrad	30	7	5	18	36	55	−19	19	
16	RUS	Energiya Saratov	30	4	10	16	23	45	−22	18	

Source: rsssf.com

=== Top goalscorers ===
Class A

- Eduard Streltsov (Torpedo Moscow) – 15 goals
