= 1953 in Soviet football =

Football in the Soviet Union
- Season: 1953

Men's football
- Class A: Spartak Moscow
- Class B: Dinamo Minsk
- Soviet Cup: Dinamo Moscow

The 1953 Soviet football championship was the 21st seasons of competitive football in the Soviet Union and the 15th among teams of sports societies and factories. Spartak Moscow won the championship becoming the Soviet domestic champions for the fifth time and tying with the Army team and Dinamo.

== Honours ==
Competition	Winner	Runner-up
Class A	Spartak Moscow (5)	Dinamo Tbilisi
Class B	Dinamo Minsk	Torpedo Gorkiy
Soviet Cup	Dinamo Moscow (2)	Zenit Kuibyshev

Notes = Number in parentheses is the times that club has won that honour. * indicates new record for competition

== Soviet Union football championship ==
=== Class A ===
Pos	Team	Pld	W	D	L	GF	GA	GD	Pts	Qualification
1	(Russian Soviet Federative Socialist Republic) Spartak Moscow (C)	20	11	7	2	47	15	+32	29	League champions
2	(Georgian Soviet Socialist Republic) Dynamo Tbilisi	20	11	5	4	39	24	+15	27	
3	(Russian Soviet Federative Socialist Republic) Torpedo Moscow	20	11	3	6	34	34	0	25	
4	(Russian Soviet Federative Socialist Republic) Dynamo Moscow	20	8	7	5	34	19	+15	23	
5	(Russian Soviet Federative Socialist Republic) Zenit Leningrad	20	11	1	8	25	21	+4	23	
6	(Russian Soviet Federative Socialist Republic) Lokomotiv Moscow	20	6	6	8	21	28	−7	18	
7	(Russian Soviet Federative Socialist Republic) Krylia Sovetov Kuybyshev	20	6	5	9	22	25	−3	17	
8	(Ukrainian Soviet Socialist Republic) Dynamo Kiev	20	6	5	9	22	26	−4	17	
9	(Ukrainian Soviet Socialist Republic) Lokomotiv Kharkov	20	6	4	10	19	34	−15	16	
10	(Russian Soviet Federative Socialist Republic) Dynamo Leningrad (R)	20	5	4	11	20	33	−13	14	Relegation to Class B
11	(Lithuanian Soviet Socialist Republic) Spartak Vilnius (R)	20	2	7	11	10	33	−23	11	Relegation to Class B

Source: rsssf.com
(C) Champions; (R) Relegated

=== Class B (second stage) ===
==== For places 1-6 ====
Pos	Rep	Team	Pld	W	D	L	GF	GA	GD	Pts	Promotion
1	BLR	Dinamo Minsk	5	4	1	0	11	1	+10	9	Promoted
2	RUS	Torpedo Gorkiy	5	3	1	1	9	4	+5	7	Promoted
3	UKR	Shakhtyor Stalino	5	3	0	2	6	5	+1	6	
4	RUS	Krasnoye Znamya Ivanovo	5	2	0	3	6	10	−4	4	
5	ARM	Dinamo Yerevan	5	0	3	2	2	5	−3	3	
6	GEO	Spartak Tbilisi	5	0	1	4	1	10	−9	1	

Source: rsssf.com
Notes:

Sep 13–27, Gorkiy

==== For places 7-9 ====
Pos	Rep	Team	Pld	W	D	L	GF	GA	GD	Pts
7	UKR	Metallurg Odessa	2	2	0	0	5	1	+4	4
8	RUS	Torpedo Rostov-na-Donu	2	1	0	1	5	5	0	2
9	UKR	Metallurg Zaporozhye	2	0	0	2	5	9	−4	0

Source: rsssf.com

==== For places 10-12 ====
Pos	Rep	Team	Pld	W	D	L	GF	GA	GD	Pts
10	RUS	Zenit Kaliningrad (M.R.)	2	2	0	0	3	1	+2	4
11	AZE	Neftyanik Baku	2	1	0	1	3	3	0	2
12	RUS	Torpedo Stalingrad	2	0	0	2	3	5	−2	0

Source: rsssf.com
Notes:

Sep 27 - Oct 1, Baku

==== For places 13-15 ====
[Oct 11, Riga] 

- Daugava Riga 2-0 Avangard Chelyabinsk
- Dinamo Alma-Ata withdrew.

==== For places 16-18 ====
Pos	Rep	Team	Pld	W	D	L	GF	GA	GD	Pts
16	MDA	Burevestnik Kishinev	2	1	1	0	5	2	+3	3
17	RUS	Krylya Sovetov Molotov	2	1	0	1	2	4	−2	2
18	TKM	Spartak Ashkhabad	2	0	1	1	1	2	−1	1

Source: rsssf.com
Notes:

Sep 29 – Oct 3, Kishinev

==== For places 19-21 ====
Pos	Rep	Team	Pld	W	D	L	GF	GA	GD	Pts
19	RUS	Avangard Sverdlovsk	2	2	0	0	9	1	+8	4
20	EST	Kalev Tallinn	2	1	0	1	2	2	0	2
21	UZB	Spartak Tashkent	2	0	0	2	1	9	−8	0

Source: rsssf.com
Notes:

Sep 27 – Oct 1, Sverdlovsk

==== For places 22-24 ====
Pos	Rep	Team	Pld	W	D	L	GF	GA	GD	Pts
22	UKR	Metallurg Dnepropetrovsk	2	2	0	0	5	0	+5	4
23	RUS	Spartak Kalinin	2	1	0	1	9	5	+4	2
24	KGZ	Iskra Frunze	2	0	0	2	2	11	−9	0

Source: rsssf.com
Notes:

Sep 26–29, Dnepropetrovsk

==== For places 25-27 ====
Pos	Rep	Team	Pld	W	D	L	GF	GA	GD	Pts
25	RUS	Khimik Moskva	2	1	1	0	8	1	+7	3
26	RUS	Krasnaya Zvezda Petrozavodsk	2	1	1	0	6	2	+4	3
27	TJK	Gornyak Leninabad	2	0	0	2	1	12	−11	0

Source: rsssf.com
Notes:

Sep 25–29, Moskva

=== Top goalscorers ===
Class A

- Nikita Simonyan (Spartak Moscow), Avtandil Gogoberidze (Dinamo Tbilisi) – 14 goals
