= 1960 in Soviet football =

Football in the Soviet Union
- Season: 1960

Men's football
- Class A: Torpedo Moscow
- Class B: Trud Voronezh (Russia); Metallurg Zaporozhye (Ukraine); Torpedo Kutaisi (Union republics)
- Soviet Cup: Torpedo Moscow

The 1960 Soviet football championship was the 28th seasons of competitive football in the Soviet Union and the 22nd among teams of sports societies and factories. Torpedo Moscow won the championship becoming the Soviet domestic champions for the first time.

== Honours ==
Competition	Winner	Runner-up
Class A	Torpedo Moscow (1)	Dinamo Kiev
Class B	Trud Voronezh (Russia)	Irtysh Omsk (Russia)
Class B	Metallurg Zaporozhye (Ukraine)	Sudostroitel Nikolayev (Ukraine)
Class B	Torpedo Kutaisi (Union republics)	Lokomotiv Tbilisi (Union republics)
Soviet Cup	Torpedo Moscow (3)	Dinamo Tbilisi

Notes = Number in parentheses is the times that club has won that honour. * indicates new record for competition

== Soviet Union football championship ==
=== Class A (second stage) ===
==== Places 1–6 ====
Pos	Team	Pld	W	D	L	GF	GA	GD	Pts
1	(Russian Soviet Federative Socialist Republic) Torpedo Moscow (C)	10	6	2	2	17	9	+8	14
2	(Ukrainian Soviet Socialist Republic) Dynamo Kiev	10	5	1	4	19	14	+5	11
3	(Russian Soviet Federative Socialist Republic) Dynamo Moscow	10	5	1	4	12	10	+2	11
4	(Russian Soviet Federative Socialist Republic) SKA Rostov-on-Don	10	2	6	2	13	12	+1	10
5	(Russian Soviet Federative Socialist Republic) Lokomotiv Moscow	10	3	1	6	14	19	−5	7
6	(Russian Soviet Federative Socialist Republic) CSKA Moscow	10	3	1	6	7	18	−11	7

Source: rsssf.com
(C) Champions

==== Places 7–12 ====
Pos	Team	Pld	W	D	L	GF	GA	GD	Pts
7	(Russian Soviet Federative Socialist Republic) Spartak Moscow	10	5	3	2	19	14	+5	13
8	(Georgian Soviet Socialist Republic) Dynamo Tbilisi	10	5	2	3	18	12	+6	12
9	(Armenian Soviet Socialist Republic) Ararat Yerevan	10	4	3	3	11	12	−1	11
10	(Russian Soviet Federative Socialist Republic) Admiralteyets Leningrad	10	4	1	5	17	15	+2	9
11	(Byelorussian Soviet Socialist Republic) Belarus Minsk	10	4	1	5	8	12	−4	9
12	(Latvian Soviet Socialist Republic) Daugava Riga	10	1	4	5	10	18	−8	6

Source: rsssf.com

==== Places 13–18 ====
Pos	Team	Pld	W	D	L	GF	GA	GD	Pts	Relegation
13	(Ukrainian Soviet Socialist Republic) Avangard Kharkiv	10	4	4	2	11	5	+6	12	
14	(Uzbek Soviet Socialist Republic) Pakhtakor Tashkent	10	4	3	3	11	9	+2	11	
15	(Russian Soviet Federative Socialist Republic) Zenit Leningrad	10	5	1	4	13	12	+1	11	
16	(Russian Soviet Federative Socialist Republic) Krylia Sovetov Kuybyshev (Note: Krylia Sovetov Kuybyshev were relegated because they were a worst ranked team from Russia.) (R)	10	4	2	4	15	13	+2	10	Relegation to Class B
17	(Ukrainian Soviet Socialist Republic) Shakhtyor Stalino (Note: Shakhtyor Stalino played a relegation play-out match because they were a worst ranked team from Ukraine.) (O)	10	4	2	4	10	12	−2	10	Qualification for relegation play-off
18	(Kazakh Soviet Socialist Republic) Kairat Almaty	10	3	0	7	6	15	−9	6	

Source: rsssf.com
(O) Play-off winners; (R) Relegated

==== Places 19–22 ====
Pos	Team	Pld	W	D	L	GF	GA	GD	Pts
19	(Estonian Soviet Socialist Republic) Kalev Tallinn	6	2	3	1	8	11	−3	7
20	(Lithuanian Soviet Socialist Republic) Spartak Vilnius	6	1	4	1	8	8	0	6
21	(Azerbaijan Soviet Socialist Republic) Neftyanik Baku	6	2	2	2	6	7	−1	6
22	(Moldavian Soviet Socialist Republic) Moldova Kishinyov	6	1	3	2	10	6	+4	5

Source: rsssf.com

==== Promotion/relegation play-off ====
[Nov 3, 6]

- Shakhtyor Stalino 2-0 0-1 Metallurg Zaporozhye

=== Class B ===
==== Russian Federation finals ====
[Oct 25 – Nov 5, Shakhty]

Pos	Team	Pld	W	D	L	GF	GA	GD	Pts	Promotion
1	Trud Voronezh	4	3	0	1	10	5	+5	6	Promoted
2	Irtysh Omsk	4	2	1	1	3	3	0	5	
3	Volga Kalinin	4	2	0	2	7	4	+3	4	
4	Metallurg Nizhniy Tagil	4	1	1	2	5	8	−3	3	
5	Terek Grozny	4	0	2	2	6	11	−5	2	

==== Ukraine finals ====
[Oct 28, 30, Kiev]

- Metallurg Zaporozhye 6-2 0-0 Sudostroitel Nikolayev

==== Union republics finals ====
[Oct 30, Nov 5] 

- Torpedo Kutaisi 2-0 0-1 Lokomotiv Tbilisi

=== Top goalscorers ===
Class A

- Zaur Kaloyev (Dinamo Tbilisi) – 20 goals
