= 1956 in Soviet football =

Football in the Soviet Union
- Season: 1956

Men's football
- Class A: Spartak Moscow
- Class B: Spartak Minsk (Group I); Krylia Sovetov Kuibyshev (Group II)
- Soviet Cup: none

The 1956 Soviet football championship was the 24th seasons of competitive football in the Soviet Union and the 18th among teams of sports societies and factories. Spartak Moscow won the championship becoming the Soviet domestic champions for the sixth time.

== Honours ==
Competition	Winner	Runner-up
Class A	Spartak Moscow (6)	Dinamo Moscow
Class B	Spartak Minsk (Group I)	Torpedo Taganrog (Group I)
Class B	Krylia Sovetov Kuibyshev (Group II)	ODO Tbilisi (Group II)
Soviet Cup	N/A	N/A

Notes = Number in parentheses is the times that club has won that honour. * indicates new record for competition

== Soviet Union football championship ==
=== Class A ===
Pos	Team	Pld	W	D	L	GF	GA	GD	Pts	Qualification
1	(Russian Soviet Federative Socialist Republic) Spartak Moscow (C)	22	15	4	3	68	28	+40	34	League champions
2	(Russian Soviet Federative Socialist Republic) Dynamo Moscow	22	10	8	4	45	31	+14	28	
3	(Russian Soviet Federative Socialist Republic) CDSA Moscow	22	10	5	7	40	32	+8	25	
4	(Ukrainian Soviet Socialist Republic) Dynamo Kiev	22	7	10	5	32	31	+1	24	
5	(Russian Soviet Federative Socialist Republic) Torpedo Moscow	22	8	7	7	40	37	+3	23	
6	(Moldavian Soviet Socialist Republic) Burevestnik Kishinyov	22	9	5	8	38	49	−11	23	
7	(Ukrainian Soviet Socialist Republic) Shakhtyor Stalino	22	7	7	8	30	39	−9	21	
8	(Georgian Soviet Socialist Republic) Dynamo Tbilisi	22	8	4	10	42	46	−4	20	
9	(Russian Soviet Federative Socialist Republic) Zenit Leningrad	22	4	11	7	27	43	−16	19	
10	(Russian Soviet Federative Socialist Republic) Lokomotiv Moscow	22	5	8	9	38	28	+10	18	
11	(Russian Soviet Federative Socialist Republic) ODO Sverdlovsk (R)	22	6	4	12	31	45	−14	16	Relegation to Class B
12	(Russian Soviet Federative Socialist Republic) Trudovyye Rezervy Leningrad (R)	22	3	7	12	25	47	−22	13	Relegation to Class B

Source: rsssf.com
(C) Champions; (R) Relegated

=== Class B ===
==== Group I ====
Pos	Rep	Team	Pld	W	D	L	GF	GA	GD	Pts	Promotion
1	BLR	Spartak Minsk	34	18	11	5	45	26	+19	47	Promoted
2	RUS	Torpedo Taganrog	34	18	10	6	65	33	+32	46	
3	UKR	Metallurg Zaporozhye	34	21	4	9	54	35	+19	46	
4	RUS	Shakhtyor Mosbass (Note: Shakhtyor Stalinogorsk relocated to Mosbass.)	34	19	6	9	56	36	+20	44	
5	UKR	ODO Lvov	34	16	9	9	49	25	+24	41	
6	UKR	ODO Kiev	34	15	9	10	43	27	+16	39	
7	RUS	Krylya Sovetov Stupino	34	14	10	10	51	33	+18	38	
8	RUS	Krasnoye Znamya Ivanovo	34	13	10	11	37	36	+1	36	
9	LTU	Spartak Vilnius	34	12	11	11	51	29	+22	35	
10	UKR	Avangard Kharkov	34	14	7	13	40	44	−4	35	
11	EST	Dinamo Tallinn	34	11	10	13	36	44	−8	32	
12	UKR	Spartak Stanislav	34	12	6	16	49	57	−8	30	
13	UKR	Spartak Uzhgorod	34	7	15	12	28	33	−5	29	
14	UKR	Metallurg Dnepropetrovsk	34	10	9	15	40	58	−18	29	
15	UKR	Pishchevik Odessa	34	8	10	16	40	57	−17	26	
16	LVA	Daugava Riga	34	9	8	17	27	48	−21	26	
17	RUS	Spartak Kalinin	34	8	9	17	27	48	−21	25	
18	RUS	ODO Petrozavodsk	34	2	4	28	20	89	−69	8	

Source: rsssf.com

==== Group II ====
Pos	Rep	Team	Pld	W	D	L	GF	GA	GD	Pts	Promotion
1	RUS	Krylya Sovetov Kuibyshev	34	26	5	3	84	19	+65	57	Promoted
2	GEO	ODO Tbilisi	34	24	7	3	98	32	+66	55	
3	ARM	Spartak Yerevan	34	18	10	6	72	27	+45	46	
4	RUS	Neftyanik Krasnodar	34	19	4	11	70	52	+18	42	
5	AZE	Neftyanik Baku	34	16	7	11	71	53	+18	39	
6	RUS	Krylya Sovetov Voronezh	34	13	13	8	40	34	+6	39	
7	RUS	Torpedo Gorkiy	34	16	6	12	55	48	+7	38	
8	RUS	Zenit Izhevsk	34	13	12	9	50	49	+1	38	
9	RUS	Krylya Sovetov Molotov	34	12	9	13	35	39	−4	33	
10	RUS	Avangard Chelyabinsk	34	12	7	15	37	41	−4	31	
11	RUS	Torpedo Stalingrad	34	12	7	15	45	52	−7	31	
12	RUS	Torpedo Rostov-na-Donu	34	11	8	15	59	50	+9	30	
13	UZB	Pahtakor Tashkent (Note: Pahtakor Tashkent was called Spartak.)	34	12	6	16	44	53	−9	30	
14	RUS	Avangard Sverdlovsk	34	10	10	14	40	53	−13	30	
15	KAZ	Kayrat Alma-Ata (Note: Kayrat Alma-Ata was called Urozhai.)	34	9	10	15	41	52	−11	28	
16	KGZ	Spartak Frunze	34	6	8	20	30	75	−45	20	
17	TKM	Kolhozchi Ashkhabad	34	6	6	22	28	75	−47	18	
18	TJK	Kolhozchi Stalinabad	28	1	5	22	22	117	−95	7	

Source: rsssf.com

=== Top goalscorers ===
Class A

- Vasiliy Buzunov (ODO Sverdlovsk) – 17 goals
