= 1951 in Soviet football =

Football in the Soviet Union
- Season: 1951

Men's football
- Class A: CDSA Moscow
- Class B: VMS Moscow
- Soviet Cup: Spartak Moscow

The 1951 Soviet football championship was the 19th season of competitive football in the Soviet Union and the 13th among teams of sports societies and factories. CDSA Moscow again won the championship becoming the Soviet domestic champions for the fifth time and tied with Dynamo for the number of league titles won.

The defending champions CDSA defeated their main rivals Dinamo (2–1, 2–0) and took this season title.

== Honours ==
Competition	Winner	Runner-up
Class A	CDSA Moscow (5)	Dinamo Tbilisi
Class B	MVO Kalinin	Dinamo Minsk
Soviet Cup	CDSA Moscow (3)	MVO Kalinin

Notes = Number in parentheses is the times that club has won that honour. * indicates new record for competition

== Soviet Union football championship ==
=== Class A ===
Pos	Team	Pld	W	D	L	GF	GA	GD	Pts	Qualification
1	(Russian Soviet Federative Socialist Republic) CDSA Moscow (C)	28	18	7	3	53	19	+34	43	League champions
2	(Georgian Soviet Socialist Republic) Dynamo Tbilisi	28	15	6	7	59	36	+23	36	
3	(Ukrainian Soviet Socialist Republic) Shakhtyor Stalino	28	12	10	6	44	30	+14	34	
4	(Russian Soviet Federative Socialist Republic) Krylia Sovetov Kuybyshev	28	11	12	5	34	25	+9	34	
5	(Russian Soviet Federative Socialist Republic) Dynamo Moscow	28	13	6	9	62	41	+21	32	
6	(Russian Soviet Federative Socialist Republic) Spartak Moscow	28	13	5	10	50	35	+15	31	
7	(Russian Soviet Federative Socialist Republic) Zenit Leningrad	28	10	8	10	36	40	−4	28	
8	(Ukrainian Soviet Socialist Republic) Dynamo Kiev	28	9	9	10	43	39	+4	27	
9	(Russian Soviet Federative Socialist Republic) Dynamo Leningrad	28	11	5	12	46	53	−7	27	
10	(Russian Soviet Federative Socialist Republic) VVS Moscow	28	11	4	13	44	56	−12	26	
11	(Latvian Soviet Socialist Republic) Daugava Riga	28	9	7	12	44	44	0	25	
12	(Russian Soviet Federative Socialist Republic) Torpedo Moscow	28	8	8	12	37	48	−11	24	
13	(Russian Soviet Federative Socialist Republic) VMS Moscow (R)	28	7	9	12	30	50	−20	23	Relegation to Class B
14	(Georgian Soviet Socialist Republic) Spartak Tbilisi (R)	28	7	2	19	32	56	−24	16	Relegation to Class B
15	(Russian Soviet Federative Socialist Republic) Torpedo Gorky (R)	28	4	6	18	20	62	−42	14	Relegation to Class B

Source: rsssf.com
(C) Champions; (R) Relegated

=== Class B ===
Pos	Rep	Team	Pld	W	D	L	GF	GA	GD	Pts	Promotion
1	RUS	MVO Kalinin	34	19	11	4	62	26	+36	49	Promoted
2	BLR	Dinamo Minsk	34	21	7	6	57	30	+27	49	Promoted
3	RUS	Lokomotiv Moskva	34	19	10	5	72	38	+34	48	Promoted
4	AZE	Neftyanik Baku	34	17	11	6	56	27	+29	45	
5	RUS	Torpedo Stalingrad	34	16	11	7	66	38	+28	43	
6	UKR	Lokomotiv Kharkov	34	17	9	8	60	38	+22	43	
7	LTU	Spartak Vilnius	34	15	9	10	47	40	+7	39	
8	ARM	Dinamo Yerevan	34	14	10	10	40	22	+18	38	
9	UKR	Spartak Uzhgorod (R)	34	14	9	11	51	41	+10	37	Relegated after play-off
10	MDA	Burevestnik Kishinev	34	12	10	12	47	37	+10	34	
11	RUS	Krasnoye Znamya Ivanovo	34	13	7	14	49	49	0	33	
12	KAR	Krasnaya Zvezda Petrozavodsk (Note: Krasnaya Zvezda Petrozavodsk replaced withdrawn Lokomotiv)	34	10	9	15	28	39	−11	29	
13	UZB	DO Tashkent	34	10	7	17	30	48	−18	27	
14	EST	Kalev Tallinn	34	9	7	18	31	48	−17	25	
15	TJK	Dinamo Stalinabad (Note: Dinamo Stalinabad replaced withdrawn Bolshevik)	34	10	5	19	33	74	−41	25	
16	KGZ	Trudoviye Rezervy Frunze	34	7	7	20	36	67	−31	21	
17	KAZ	Dinamo Alma-Ata	34	6	8	20	30	59	−29	20	
18	TKM	Spartak Ashkhabad	34	2	3	29	17	91	−74	7	

Source: rsssf.com
(R) Relegated

=== Top goalscorers ===
Class A

- Avtandil Gogoberidze (Dinamo Tbilisi) – 16 goals
