= 1958 in Soviet football =

Football in the Soviet Union
- Season: 1958

Men's football
- Class A: Spartak Moscow
- Class B: SKVO Rostov-na-Donu
- Soviet Cup: Spartak Moscow

The 1958 Soviet football championship was the 26th seasons of competitive football in the Soviet Union and the 20th among teams of sports societies and factories. Spartak Moscow won the championship becoming the Soviet domestic champions for the seventh time.

== Honours ==
Competition	Winner	Runner-up
Class A	Spartak Moscow (7)	Dinamo Moscow
Class B	SKVO Rostov-na-Donu	SKVO Sverdlovsk
Soviet Cup	Spartak Moscow (6*)	Torpedo Moscow

Notes = Number in parentheses is the times that club has won that honour. * indicates new record for competition

== Soviet Union football championship ==
=== Class A ===
Pos	Team	Pld	W	D	L	GF	GA	GD	Pts	Qualification or relegation
1	(Russian Soviet Federative Socialist Republic) Spartak Moscow (C)	22	13	6	3	55	28	+27	32	League champions
2	(Russian Soviet Federative Socialist Republic) Dynamo Moscow	22	14	3	5	44	25	+19	31	
3	(Russian Soviet Federative Socialist Republic) CSK MO Moscow	22	9	9	4	40	25	+15	27	
4	(Russian Soviet Federative Socialist Republic) Zenit Leningrad	22	9	8	5	41	32	+9	26	
5	(Russian Soviet Federative Socialist Republic) Lokomotiv Moscow	22	9	6	7	48	34	+14	24	
6	(Ukrainian Soviet Socialist Republic) Dynamo Kiev	22	7	9	6	40	33	+7	23	
7	(Russian Soviet Federative Socialist Republic) Torpedo Moscow	22	7	8	7	51	42	+9	22	
8	(Ukrainian Soviet Socialist Republic) Shakhtyor Stalino	22	9	3	10	22	32	−10	21	
9	(Georgian Soviet Socialist Republic) Dynamo Tbilisi	22	8	3	11	34	55	−21	19	
10	(Russian Soviet Federative Socialist Republic) Krylia Sovetov Kuybyshev	22	6	6	10	23	29	−6	18	
11	(Moldavian Soviet Socialist Republic) Moldova Kishinyov	22	3	9	10	25	47	−22	15	
12	(Russian Soviet Federative Socialist Republic) Admiralteyets Leningrad (R)	22	3	0	19	22	63	−41	6	Relegation to Class B

Source: rsssf.com
(C) Champions; (R) Relegated

=== Class B (final stage) ===
[Nov 5-22, Tbilisi] 

Pos	Rep	Team	Pld	W	D	L	GF	GA	GD	Pts	Promotion
1	RUS	SKVO Rostov-na-Donu	5	4	1	0	10	4	+6	9	Promoted
2	RUS	SKVO Sverdlovsk	5	3	2	0	14	6	+8	8	
3	UKR	SKCF Sevastopol	5	2	1	2	9	8	+1	5	
4	UKR	SKVO Odessa	5	1	1	3	9	11	−2	3	
5	UKR	SKVO Lvov	5	1	1	3	8	13	−5	3	
6	RUS	SKVO Khabarovsk	5	1	0	4	6	14	−8	2	

Source: rsssf.com

=== Top goalscorers ===
Class A

- Anatoliy Ilyin (Spartak Moscow) – 19 goals
