= Nikolay Gulyayev (footballer) =

Russian footballer (1915–2000)

Nikolay Alekseyevich Gulyayev (Russian: Николай Алексеевич Гуляев; 18 February 1915 – 23 February 2000) was a Russian football player and coach.

== Career ==
A midfielder, Gulyayev debuted for Spartak Moscow in 1936. In 1947 he joined the team in Kaliningrad, which ended his football career. In 1955 he was appointed head coach of Spartak Moscow, with whom he worked until 1959, then in 1966 and in 1973–1975. In addition, he worked 1956–57, April 1960 - June 1964, and January–June 1972 amongst the coaching staff of the USSR national team, and in 1957 the Soviet Union youth team. He also worked with the Olympic team of the USSR, which he ran from May 1969 to June 1970 and helped to train in 1970–71 and 1975. In 1964–65 and 1967–68 he served as head coach of the USSR Football Federation. In 1976–77 he trained FSzM Moscow, and later managed Ararat Yerevan (January–August 1978). In the years 1982–1986 he worked as deputy director of Spartak Moscow. He died on 23 February 2000, in Moscow.
