= Vladimir Gorokhov =

Soviet footballer and coach

Vladimir Ivanovich Gorokhov (Russian: Владимир Иванович Горохов; May 26, 1911 – November 1, 1985) was a Soviet football player and coach.

Gorokhov was the head coach of Spartak Moscow in 1940, in 1942-1943, and a coach in 1945.
