= 1965 in Soviet football =

Football in the Soviet Union
- Season: 1965

Men's football
- Class A 1. Group: Torpedo Moscow
- Class A 2. Group: Ararat Yerevan
- Class B: Spartak Nalchik (Russia); SKA Lvov (Ukraine); Dinamo Kirovobad (Union republics)
- Soviet Cup: Spartak Moscow

The 1965 Soviet football championship was the 33rd seasons of competitive football in the Soviet Union and the 27th among teams of sports societies and factories. Torpedo Moscow won the championship becoming the Soviet domestic champions for the second time.

== Honours ==
Competition	Winner	Runner-up
Class A 1. Group	Torpedo Moscow (2)	Dinamo Kiev
Class A 2. Group	Ararat Yerevan (1)	Kairat Alma-Ata
Class B	Spartak Nalchik (Russia)	Rubin Kazan (Russia)
Class B	SKA Lvov (Ukraine)	SKA Kiev (Ukraine)
Class B	Dinamo Kirovobad (Union republics)	Dinamo Baku (Union republics)
Soviet Cup	Spartak Moscow (8*)	Dinamo Minsk

Notes = Number in parentheses is the times that club has won that honour. * indicates new record for competition

== Soviet Union football championship ==
=== Class A First Group ===
Pos	Team	Pld	W	D	L	GF	GA	GD	Pts	Qualification
1	(Russian Soviet Federative Socialist Republic) Torpedo Moscow (C)	32	22	7	3	55	21	+34	51	Qualification for European Cup first round
2	(Ukrainian Soviet Socialist Republic) Dynamo Kyiv	32	22	6	4	58	22	+36	50	
3	(Russian Soviet Federative Socialist Republic) CSKA Moscow	32	14	10	8	38	24	+14	38	
4	(Byelorussian Soviet Socialist Republic) Dinamo Minsk	32	14	9	9	37	27	+10	37	
5	(Russian Soviet Federative Socialist Republic) Dynamo Moscow	32	11	14	7	38	24	+14	36	
6	(Georgian Soviet Socialist Republic) Dinamo Tbilisi	32	12	12	8	37	30	+7	36	
7	(Russian Soviet Federative Socialist Republic) SKA Rostov-on-Don	32	10	14	8	42	35	+7	34	
8	(Russian Soviet Federative Socialist Republic) Spartak Moscow	32	10	12	10	28	26	+2	32	Qualification for Cup Winners' Cup first round
9	(Russian Soviet Federative Socialist Republic) Zenit Leningrad	32	10	12	10	32	32	0	32	
10	(Uzbek Soviet Socialist Republic) Pakhtakor Tashkent	32	10	12	10	34	40	−6	32	
11	(Azerbaijan Soviet Socialist Republic) Neftyanik Baku	32	11	8	13	32	33	−1	30	
12	(Ukrainian Soviet Socialist Republic) Shakhtar Donetsk	32	7	14	11	29	34	−5	28	
13	(Russian Soviet Federative Socialist Republic) Krylya Sovetov Kuybyshev	32	9	9	14	34	44	−10	27	
14	(Ukrainian Soviet Socialist Republic) Chornomorets Odessa	32	9	8	15	35	43	−8	26	
15	(Russian Soviet Federative Socialist Republic) Lokomotiv Moscow	32	8	8	16	37	48	−11	24	
16	(Georgian Soviet Socialist Republic) Torpedo Kutaisi	32	8	3	21	29	69	−40	19	
17	(Ukrainian Soviet Socialist Republic) SKA Odessa	32	3	6	23	22	65	−43	12	

Source: rsssf.com
(C) Champions

=== Class A Second Group ===
==== For places 1-16 ====
Pos	Rep	Team	Pld	W	D	L	GF	GA	GD	Pts	Promotion
1	ARM	Ararat Yerevan	30	16	6	8	46	34	+12	38	Promoted
2	KAZ	Kayrat Alma-Ata	30	13	12	5	37	17	+20	38	Promoted
3	UKR	Avangard Kharkov	30	15	6	9	36	34	+2	36	
4	RUS	Textilshchik Ivanovo	30	13	9	8	40	27	+13	35	
5	RUS	Shinnik Yaroslavl	30	14	7	9	36	23	+13	35	
6	RUS	UralMash Sverdlovsk	30	13	9	8	39	28	+11	35	
7	UKR	Zarya Lugansk	30	12	9	9	33	29	+4	33	
8	UKR	Dnepr Dnepropetrovsk	30	11	9	10	28	27	+1	31	
9	UKR	Karpaty Lvov	30	10	10	10	29	25	+4	30	
10	LTU	Žalgiris Vilnius	30	10	8	12	33	33	0	28	
11	RUS	Volga Gorkiy	30	12	4	14	28	39	−11	28	
12	KAZ	Shakhtyor Karaganda	30	9	9	12	25	26	−1	27	
13	RUS	Terek Grozny	30	10	5	15	33	45	−12	25	
14	MDA	Moldova Kishinev	30	7	9	14	16	29	−13	23	
15	LVA	Daugava Riga	30	6	8	16	26	47	−21	20	
16	RUS	Lokomotiv Chelyabinsk	30	4	10	16	21	43	−22	18	

Notes:

Match for 1st place

[Nov 25, Grozny]

- Ararat Yerevan 2-1 Kayrat Alma-Ata

==== For places 17-32 ====
Pos	Rep	Team	Pld	W	D	L	GF	GA	GD	Pts
17	KGZ	Alga Frunze	46	19	13	14	49	39	+10	51
18	RUS	Traktor Volgograd	46	14	19	13	45	44	+1	47
19	RUS	SKA Novosibirsk	46	16	15	15	51	53	−2	47
20	RUS	Dinamo Leningrad	46	16	14	16	69	60	+9	46
21	UKR	Lokomotiv Vinnitsa	46	13	20	13	41	37	+4	46
22	RUS	Trud Voronezh	46	12	22	12	41	38	+3	46
23	UZB	Politotdel Tashkent Region	46	15	16	15	35	37	−2	46
24	BLR	Spartak Gomel	46	14	17	15	35	42	−7	45
25	RUS	Kuban Krasnodar	46	14	15	17	38	41	−3	43
26	GEO	Lokomotiv Tbilisi	46	14	12	20	60	63	−3	40
27	TKM	Stroitel Ashkhabad	46	14	11	21	52	64	−12	39
28	UKR	Metallurg Zaporozhye	46	11	15	20	44	60	−16	37
29	TJK	Energetik Dushanbe	46	10	15	21	39	55	−16	35
30	RUS	Volga Kalinin	46	12	11	23	33	57	−24	35
31	EST	Dinamo Tallinn	46	6	16	24	34	69	−35	28
32	RUS	RostSelMash Rostov-na-Donu	46	9	9	28	37	76	−39	27

Source: rsssf.com

=== Final group ===
[Nov 13–20, Nalchik]

Pos	Team	Pld	W	D	L	GF	GA	GD	Pts
1	Spartak Nalchik	3	3	0	0	9	1	+8	6
2	Rubin Kazan	3	2	0	1	4	4	0	4
3	Sokol Saratov	3	1	0	2	5	6	−1	2
4	Stroitel Ufa	3	0	0	3	1	8	−7	0

==== Ukraine (second stage) ====
===== For places 1-6 =====
Pos	Team	Pld	W	D	L	GF	GA	GD	Pts
1	SKA Lvov	10	7	2	1	24	9	+15	16
2	SKA Kiev	10	7	1	2	23	16	+7	15
3	Avangard Zholtyye Vody	10	4	3	3	14	9	+5	11
4	Tavria Simferopol	10	3	4	3	10	11	−1	10
5	Avangard Ternopol	10	1	4	5	6	14	−8	6
6	Shakhtyor Kadiyevka	10	0	2	8	4	22	−18	2

===== For places 7-12 =====
Pos	Team	Pld	W	D	L	GF	GA	GD	Pts
7	Zvezda Kirovograd	10	6	3	1	14	9	+5	15
8	Kommunarets Kommunarsk	10	6	1	3	12	10	+2	13
9	Shakhtyor Alexandria	10	4	2	4	12	9	+3	10
10	Dinamo Khmelnitskiy	10	3	2	5	13	15	−2	8
11	SKF Sevastopol	10	2	4	4	8	10	−2	8
12	Kolos Poltava	10	2	2	6	7	13	−6	6

Source: rsssf.com

==== Union republics finals ====
[Nov 19–24, Baku]

Pos	Rep	Team	Pld	W	D	L	GF	GA	GD	Pts
1	AZE	Dinamo Kirovabad	3	2	1	0	5	1	+4	5
1	AZE	Dinamo Baku	3	2	1	0	6	1	+5	5
3	TJK	Pamir Leninabad	3	1	0	2	4	8	−4	2
4	UZB	Neftyanik Fergana	3	0	0	3	1	6	−5	0

Source: rsssf.com

Additional final

Dinamo Kirovabad  0-0 Dinamo Baku  
[Dinamo Kirovabad won by draw of lots]

=== Top goalscorers ===
Class A First Group

- Oleg Kopayev (SKA Rostov-na-Donu) – 18 goals
