= Ivan Artemyev =

Russian footballer (1895–1968)

- Born: August 1895; Lobkovo, Ryazan Province
- Died: 18 October 1968 (aged 73); Moscow
- Occupation: Football player

Ivan Timofeevich Artemyev (7(19) August 1895 - 18 October 1968) was a Russian football player involved in the founding of FC Spartak Moscow.

Artemyev was living in Presnya, a district of Moscow, at the time of the Russian Revolution. He soon played a leading role in organising sporting activity in what was one of the most ardently revolutionary districts of Moscow. The Moscow Sports Circle was formed in 1921, and by 1922 had opened a stadium on a former potato field.
