= 1962 in Soviet football =

Football in the Soviet Union
- Season: 1962

Men's football
- Class A: Spartak Moscow
- Class B: Spartak Krasnodar (Russia); Trudovye Rezervy Lugansk (Ukraine); Shakhter Karaganda (Union republics)
- Soviet Cup: Shakhter Donetsk

The 1962 Soviet football championship was the 30th seasons of competitive football in the Soviet Union and the 24th among teams of sports societies and factories. Spartak won the championship becoming the Soviet domestic champions for the eighth time.

== Honours ==
Competition	Winner	Runner-up
Class A	Spartak Moscow (8)	Dinamo Moscow
Class B	Spartak Krasnodar (Russia)	Trud Voronezh (Russia)
Class B	Trudovye Rezervy Lugansk (Ukraine)	Chernomorets Odessa (Ukraine)
Class B	Shakhter Karaganda (Republics group 1)	Lokomotiv Gomel (Union republics)
Soviet Cup	Shakhter Donetsk (2)	Znamya Truda Orekhovo-Zuyevo

Notes = Number in parentheses is the times that club has won that honour. * indicates new record for competition

== Soviet Union football championship ==
=== Class A (second stage) ===
==== Places 1–12 ====
Pos	Team	Pld	W	D	L	GF	GA	GD	Pts
1	(Russian Soviet Federative Socialist Republic) Spartak Moscow (C)	22	14	4	4	37	18	+19	32
2	(Russian Soviet Federative Socialist Republic) Dynamo Moscow	22	10	9	3	28	14	+14	29
3	(Georgian Soviet Socialist Republic) Dinamo Tbilisi	22	10	8	4	29	20	+9	28
4	(Russian Soviet Federative Socialist Republic) CSKA Moscow	22	9	8	5	24	18	+6	26
5	(Ukrainian Soviet Socialist Republic) Dynamo Kyiv	22	8	9	5	36	28	+8	25
6	(Uzbek Soviet Socialist Republic) Pakhtakor Tashkent	22	9	5	8	24	33	−9	23
7	(Russian Soviet Federative Socialist Republic) Torpedo Moscow	22	7	8	7	35	30	+5	22
8	(Ukrainian Soviet Socialist Republic) Shakhtar Donetsk	22	8	6	8	25	25	0	22
9	(Russian Soviet Federative Socialist Republic) SKA Rostov-on-Don	22	4	9	9	25	37	−12	17
10	(Azerbaijan Soviet Socialist Republic) Neftyanik Baku	22	2	11	9	19	39	−20	15
11	(Russian Soviet Federative Socialist Republic) Zenit Leningrad	22	4	6	12	29	34	−5	14
12	(Moldavian Soviet Socialist Republic) Moldova Chisinau	22	3	5	14	20	35	−15	11

Source: rsssf.com
(C) Champions

==== Places 13–22 ====
Pos	Team	Pld	W	D	L	GF	GA	GD	Pts	Relegation
13	(Russian Soviet Federative Socialist Republic) Lokomotiv Moscow	18	7	8	3	27	18	+9	22	
14	(Ukrainian Soviet Socialist Republic) Avangard Kharkov	18	8	5	5	21	17	+4	21	
15	(Georgian Soviet Socialist Republic) FC Torpedo Kutaisi	18	7	5	6	21	16	+5	19	
16	(Russian Soviet Federative Socialist Republic) Dynamo Leningrad	18	6	6	6	21	17	+4	18	
17	(Russian Soviet Federative Socialist Republic) Krylya Sovetov Kuybyshev	18	8	2	8	27	25	+2	18	
18	(Armenian Soviet Socialist Republic) Spartak Yerevan	18	7	4	7	23	23	0	18	
19	(Byelorussian Soviet Socialist Republic) Belarus Minsk	18	6	6	6	21	22	−1	18	
20	(Kazakh Soviet Socialist Republic) Kairat Alma-Ata	18	5	7	6	14	14	0	17	
21	(Latvian Soviet Socialist Republic) Daugava Rīga (R)	18	6	4	8	14	20	−6	16	Relegation to Class A Second Group
22	(Lithuanian Soviet Socialist Republic) Žalgiris Vilnius (R)	18	4	5	9	16	33	−17	13	Relegation to Class A Second Group

Source: rsssf.com
(R) Relegated

=== Class B ===
==== Russian Federation finals ====
[Krasnodar, Oct 27 – Nov 9]

Pos	Team	Pld	W	D	L	GF	GA	GD	Pts
1	Spartak Krasnodar	4	3	1	0	7	2	+5	7
2	Trud Voronezh	4	3	0	1	7	2	+5	6
3	UralMash Sverdlovsk	4	1	2	1	3	5	−2	4
4	SKA Novosibirsk	4	1	1	2	1	4	−3	4 (Note: 1 bonus point awarded?)
5	Shinnik Yaroslavl	4	0	0	4	1	6	−5	0

==== Ukraine (second stage) ====
For places 1-6

Pos	Team	Pld	W	D	L	GF	GA	GD	Pts
1	Trudoviye Rezervy Lugansk	10	6	4	0	22	11	+11	16
2	Chernomorets Odessa	10	4	3	3	13	9	+4	11
3	Avangard Simferopol	10	3	4	3	12	14	−2	10
4	SKA Odessa	10	3	2	5	11	10	+1	8
5	Polesye Zhitomir	10	3	2	5	10	15	−5	8
6	Metallurg Zaporozhye	10	1	5	4	13	22	−9	7

==== Union republics finals ====
[Oct 31, Nov 4, Odessa] 

- Shakhtyor Karaganda 1-0 0-0 Lokomotiv Gomel

=== Top goalscorers ===
Class A

- Mikhail Mustygin (Belarus Minsk) – 17 goals
