= Starostin brothers =

The four Starostin brothers:

- Nikolai Starostin (Старостин, Николай Петрович) (1902—1996);
- Aleksandr Starostin (Старостин, Александр Петрович) (1903—1981);
- Andrey Starostin (Старостин, Андрей Петрович) (1906—1987);
- Pyotr Starostin (Старостин, Пётр Петрович) (1909—1993).

were prominent football (soccer) players in the Soviet Union. Since the 1930s they played leading roles in FC Spartak Moscow.

In 1942 they were arrested under false accusation to conspire to assassinate Joseph Stalin and other charges. Later these charges were replaced with ‘lauding bourgeois sports’, and they were sentenced to 10 years of Gulags. After Stalin's death they were rehabilitated.
