= Albert Vollrat =

Estonian wrestler and football manager

Albert Vollrat (21 October 1903 Tallinn – 10 April 1978 Tallinn) was an Estonian wrestler and football coach.

In 1921 he achieved 4th place at World Wrestling Championships in Helsinki (weight category until 58 kg).

1922-1927 he won several medals at Estonian Wrestling Championships.

1932 he was team manager of Estonian national football team.
