= 1957 Soviet Cup =

1957 Cup of USSR in Football
Кубок СССР

Tournament details
- Country: Soviet Union
- Dates: April 28 – October 26
- Teams: 24 (final stage); 74 (total)

Final positions
- Champions: Lokomotiv Moscow
- Runners-up: Spartak Moscow

The 1957 Soviet Cup was an association football cup competition of the Soviet Union.

== Participating teams ==
Enter in First round	Enter in Qualification round			
Class A 12/12 teams	Class B 62/64 teams			
✓ Dinamo Moscow; ✓ Torpedo Moscow; ✓ Spartak Moscow; ✓ Lokomotiv Moscow; ✓ CSK MO Moscow; ✓ Dinamo Kiev; ✓ Dinamo Tbilisi; ✓ Shakhter Stalino; ✓ Burevestnik Kishenev; ✓ Zenit Leningrad; ✓ Krylia Sovetov Kuibyshev; ✓ Spartak Minsk	Group I ✓ Avangard Leningrad; ✓ Torpedo Taganrog; ✓ Avangard Kharkov; ✓ Neftianik Krasnodar; ✓ Torpedo Rostov-na-Donu; ✓ Voronezh; ✓ Krasnoye Znamia Ivanovo; ✓ Metallurg Zaporozhye; ✓ SKChF Sevastopol; ✓ Torpedo Gorkiy; ✓ Lokomotiv Saratov; ✓ Torpedo Stalingrad; ✓ Khimik Yaroslavl; ✓ Neftianik Grozny; ✓ Burevestnik Leningrad; ✓ Trudovye Rezervy Voroshilovgrad; ✓ Shakhter Kadiyevka; ✓ Trudovye Rezervy Stavropol	Group II ✓ Spartak Stanislav; ✓ SKVO Lvov; ✓ Trudovye Rezervy Leningrad; ✓ Metallurg Dnepropetrovsk; ✓ Pischevik Odessa; ✓ Dinamo Tallinn; ✓ Stupino; ✓ SKVO Kiev; ✓ Shakhter Stalinogorsk; ✓ Spartak Uzhgorod; ✓ Spartak Vilnius; ✓ Kolgospnik Poltava; ✓ Avangard Nikolayev; ✓ Pischevik Kaliningrad; ✓ Urozhai Minsk; ✓ Khimik Dneprodzerzhinsk; ✓ Avangard Sormovo; ✓ Daugava Riga	Group III ✓ SKVO Tbilisi; ✓ Spartak Yerevan; ✓ Neftianik Baku; ✓ SKVO Sverdlovsk; ✓ Molotov; ✓ Lokomotiv Kutaisi; ✓ Kairat Alma-Ata; ✓ Avangard Sverdlovsk; ✓ Dinamo Kirov; ✓ Pakhtakor Tashkent; ✓ Lokomotiv Chelyabinsk; ✓ Zenit Izhevsk; ✓ Kolkhozchi Ashkhabad; ✓ Spartak Frunze; ✓ Neftianik Ufa; ✓ Urozhai Stalinabad	Group IV ✓ SKVO Khabarovsk; ✓ Dinamo Vladivostok; ✓ Burevestnik Tomsk; ✓ Krasnaya Zvezda Omsk; ✓ Energiya Irkutsk; ✗ Lokomotiv Krasnoyarsk; ✓ SKVO Chita; ✓ Sibselmash Novosibirsk; ✗ Lokomotiv Komsomolsk-na-Amure; ✓ Metallurg Stalinsk; ✓ Shakhter Kemerovo; ✓ Urozhai Barnaul

Source: []

== Competition schedule ==
=== Preliminary stage ===
==== Group 1 ====
===== Quarterfinals =====
[Apr 28] 
TORPEDO Stalingrad            3-1  Avangard Kharkov 
  [P.Popov 29, V.Smirnov 53, 71 – A.Voronin 70] 
[May 1] 
TORPEDO Taganrog              3-1  Avangard Leningrad 
  [Vl.Kutushov, V.Nechayev, L.Morozov – V.Khrapovitskiy]

===== Semifinals =====
[Apr 30] 
TORPEDO Rostov-na-Donu        2-1  Lokomotiv Saratov 
  [V.Ponedelnik, G.Koloskov – A.Glinskiy] 
[May 1] 
METALLURG Zaporozhye          7-0  Khimik Yaroslavl 
  [Turyanitsa-3, Bondar-2, Zozulya, P.Ponomaryov] 
SHAKHTYOR Kadiyevka           3-2  Neftyanik Krasnodar              [aet] 
  [Belykh-2, Abkhazava – Gogichaishvili, Zanchenko] 
Trudoviye Rezervy Stavropol   1-3  DOF Sevastopol 
  [K.Zibrov – Sklyarov, Ananyev, Krotkov] 
[May 2] 
KRASNOYE ZNAMYA Ivanovo       2-0  Burevestnik Leningrad 
  [N.Yefimov 23, A.Kachayev 58] 
Krylya Sovetov Voronezh       1-1  Trudoviye Rezervy Voroshilovgrad 
  [Ilyukhin 70 – Belyayev 60] 
TORPEDO Gorkiy                4-1  Neftyanik Grozny 
  [L.Fedotov-2, Polovinkin, Lapkin – Serednyakov] 
[May 5] 
Torpedo Stalingrad            0-2  TORPEDO Taganrog 
  [Simonov 12, Borisenko ?]

====== Semifinals replays ======
[May 3] 
KRYLYA SOVETOV Voronezh       6-1  Trudoviye Rezervy Voroshilovgrad 
  [Smotrikin 4, 56, Gornostayev 14, 17, ?, Radin 64 – Khramtsov ? pen]

===== Final =====
[May 5] 
KRASNOYE ZNAMYA Ivanovo       3-1  Torpedo Rostov-na-Donu 
  [Y.Bologov 38, V.Rubilov 65, A.Kachayev ? – A.Grigorov ?] 
SHAKHTYOR Kadiyevka           2-1  DOF Sevastopol 
  [Rozhkov, Abkhazava – Batanov] 
[May 6] 
METALLURG Zaporozhye          3-1  Krylya Sovetov Voronezh 
  [Bondar-2, Turyanitsa – Gornostayev] 
[May 14] 
TORPEDO Gorkiy                2-0  Torpedo Taganrog 
  [Silkin, Polovinkin]

==== Group 2 ====
===== Quarterfinals =====
[May 1] 
AVANGARD Nikolayev            2-0  Spartak Vilnius 
  [Polivoda 25, Belyak 29] 
[May 2] 
Metallurg Dnepropetrovsk      2-2  Spartak Uzhgorod 
  [Didevich-2 – S.Sabo, A.Tsitsei]

====== Quarterfinals replays ======
[May 3] 
METALLURG Dnepropetrovsk      3-0  Spartak Uzhgorod 
  [Maidyuk-2 Savinov]

===== Semifinals =====
[May 1] 
DINAMO Tallinn                2-1  Krylya Sovetov Stupino 
  [Fyodorov (K) og, Mikhailov – Ivanyuk] 
KOLHOSPNIK Poltava            2-1  SKVO Kiev 
  [A.Matyukhin, V.Kazankin – G.Putevskiy] 
PISHCHEVIK Kaliningrad        1-0  Urozhai Minsk                    [aet] 
  [D.Solovyov 102] 
Shakhtyor Stalinogorsk        0-2  SPARTAK Stanislav 
  [Golovei 34, 68] 
SKVO Lvov                     2-0  Pishchevik Odessa 
  [A.Kurchavenkov, A.Filyayev] 
TRUDOVIYE REZERVY Leningrad   3-0  Khimik Dneprodzerzhinsk 
  [Kolobov, M.Ivanov, Tsvetkov] 
[May 2] 
Daugava Riga                  0-3  AVANGARD Sormovo 
  [Knyazev, Doronin, Shikunov] 
[May 5] 
METALLURG Dnepropetrovsk      2-1  Avangard Nikolayev 
  [Dergach ?, Didevich 83 – Kolokolnikov 7]

===== Final =====
[May 5] 
DINAMO Tallinn                1-0  Trudoviye Rezervy Leningrad 
  [Sepp 79] 
Pishchevik Kaliningrad        1-4  SPARTAK Stanislav 
  [Kovalevskiy pen – Zhuravlyov-2, Lautner, M.Dumanskiy] 
SKVO Lvov                     1-0  Kolhospnik Poltava 
  [A.Kurchavenkov 50] 
[Jun 14] 
Metallurg Dnepropetrovsk      2-4  AVANGARD Sormovo 
  [Y.Balykin, L.Savinov – Shikunov, Sysalov, Doronin, Knyazev]

==== Group 3 ====
===== Quarterfinals =====
[Mar 27] 
OSK Tbilisi                   3-2  Spartak Yerevan 
  [T.Melashvili, D.Khundadze, V.Antonyan (S) og – M.Semerjan-2] 
[May 1] 
Krylya Sovetov Molotov        2-4  KAYRAT Alma-Ata 
  [Hamidullin, Karetnikov (Ka) og – Bolotov-2, Krasnov, Leonov] 
LOKOMOTIV Chelyabinsk         2-0  Spartak Frunze 
  [Sinitsyn, Vasilyev] 
Urozhai Stalinabad            0-3  LOKOMOTIV Kutaisi 
ZENIT Izhevsk                 2-0  Kolhozchi Ashkhabad 
  [Mokiyenko, Rogov] 
[May 2] 
DINAMO Kirov                  2-1  Neftyanik Baku 
  [Biryukov, Shulyatyev – Askerov] 
Neftyanik Ufa                 1-2  AVANGARD Sverdlovsk 
  [I.Parulava ? – M.Laptev (N) 51 og, G.Korobeinikov 60] 
[May 3] 
OSK Sverdlovsk                2-0  Pahtakor Tashkent 
  [Tufatullin, Cheryomushkin]

===== Semifinals =====
[May 5] 
KAYRAT Alma-Ata               1-0  OSK Tbilisi                      [aet]      
  [V.Bolotov] 
OSK Sverdlovsk                2-1  Dinamo Kirov 
  [Gladkikh, Potaskuyev – V.Yershov] 
[May 6] 
AVANGARD Sverdlovsk           3-1  Zenit Izhevsk                    [aet] 
  [E.Chernoivanov 37, V.Krasnov 94, V.Silantyev 107 – V.Grachov 45] 
[May 8] 
LOKOMOTIV Chelyabinsk         1-0  Lokomotiv Kutaisi 
  [V.Nechayev]

===== Final =====
[May 19] 
OSK Sverdlovsk                0-0  Avangard Sverdlovsk 
[Jun 2] 
KAYRAT Alma-Ata               4-2  Lokomotiv Chelyabinsk            [aet] 
  [L.Ostroushko, S.Gnuni, V.Bolotov, V.Sinitsyn (L) og – I.Vasilyev, V.Sinitsyn]

====== Final replays ======
[May 20] 
OSK Sverdlovsk                3-1  Avangard Sverdlovsk 
  [G.Neverov 4, 65, V.Potaskuyev 31 – V.Belousov 39 pen]

==== Group 4 ====
===== Quarterfinals =====
[May 8] 
SKVO Khabarovsk               w/o  Burevestnik Tomsk 
[May 12] 
SKVO Chita                    3-0  Urozhai Barnaul 
  [Veledinskiy 15, 70, Mayorov ?]

===== Semifinals =====
[May 12] 
DINAMO Vladivostok            1-0  SKVO Khabarovsk 
  [Ryabtsev 19] 
SibSelMash Novosibirsk        1-2  SHAKHTYOR Kemerovo               [aet] 
  [N.Kuchanov – Yegorov, Kadkin] 
[May 19] 
Energiya Irkutsk              2-3  KRASNAYA ZVEZDA Omsk 
  [Y.Galyato, V.Lutovinov – M.Kostyakov-2, V.Ledovskikh] 
SKVO Chita                    0-2  METALLURG Stalinsk 
  [Bykov, I.Mishin]

===== Final =====
[May 19] 
SHAKHTYOR Kemerovo            2-0  Dinamo Vladivostok 
  [V.Yegorov-2] 
[May 26] 
METALLURG Stalinsk            1-0  Krasnaya Zvezda Omsk 
  [V.Syurkayev]

=== Final stage ===
==== First round ====
[May 24] 
OSK Sverdlovsk                0-2  LOKOMOTIV Moskva 
  [Valentin Bubukin 55, Ivan Morgunov 82] 
[May 25] 
Shakhtyor Kemerovo            1-6  ZENIT Leningrad 
  [S.Gultikov – Stanislav Zavidonov-3, Alexandr Ivanov-2, Vladimir Vinogradov] 
[Jun 23] 
AVANGARD Sormovo              4-2  Burevestnik Kishinev 
  [Shipunov-2, Timonin, Butylkin (B) og – Eduard Danilov, Yuriy Korotkov] 
[Jul 8] 
Krasnoye Znamya Ivanovo       0-2  TORPEDO Moskva 
  [Yuriy Falin 27, 44] 
[Jul 13] 
Shakhtyor Kadiyevka           0-5  DINAMO Tbilisi 
  [Avtandil Gogoberidze-2, Shota Yamanidze, Boris Khasaia, Alexei Kvlividze] 
[Jul 14] 
Kayrat Alma-Ata               1-2  DINAMO Kiev 
  [Mazmanidi 68 – Mikhail Koman 25, Viktor Fomin 47] 
[Jul 15] 
Metallurg Zaporozhye          0-4  DINAMO Moskva 
  [Alekper Mamedov 1, 86, Vladimir Ryzhkin 33, Genrikh Fedosov 80] 
[Jul 17] 
Dinamo Tallinn                1-2  SPARTAK Minsk 
  [B.Mikhailov 46 – Alexandr Chikhladze 28, Leonid Yerokhovets 42]

==== Second round ====
[Jun 5] 
SKVO Lvov                     1-2  SPARTAK Moskva 
  [A.Kurchavenkov 32 – Anatoliy M.Ilyin 75, Nikita Simonyan 78] 
[Jun 16] 
SPARTAK Stanislav             1-0  Krylya Sovetov Kuibyshev 
  [Zhuravlyov 2] 
[Jun 21] 
Torpedo Gorkiy                2-5  SHAKHTYOR Stalino 
  [Savin-2 – Boris Rossikhin-2, Valentin Sapronov, Ivan Fedosov] 
[Jul 27] 
Spartak Minsk                 0-2  AVANGARD Sormovo                 [aet] 
  [B.Shipunov 98, V.Sysalov 111] 
[Aug 22] 
LOKOMOTIV Moskva              3-1  Dinamo Kiev 
  [Vitaliy Artemyev 15, Ivan Morgunov 74, Zaur Kaloyev 75 – Viktor Terentyev 50 pen] 
[Aug 24] 
Zenit Leningrad               1-3  TORPEDO Moskva 
  [Valeriy Tsaritsyn ? pen – Yuriy Falin 26, Eduard Streltsov 40, Vitaliy Arbutov ?] 
[Aug 25] 
DINAMO Tbilisi                2-1  Dinamo Moskva 
  [Avtandil Chkuaseli 26, Shota Yamanidze 60 – Dmitriy Shapovalov 28] 
Metallurg Stalinsk            0-6  CSK MO Moskva 
  [Vasiliy Buzunov 16, 27, 31, 87, 90, German Apukhtin 20]

==== Quarterfinals ====
[Aug 21] 
SPARTAK Moskva                4-2  Spartak Stanislav 
  [Ivan Mozer-2, Igor Netto, Anatoliy Isayev – Chepiga, Goloshchapov] 
[Aug 31] 
LOKOMOTIV Moskva              5-2  Avangard Sormovo 
  [Viktor Sokolov-3, Valentin Bubukin, Viktor Voroshilov – Sysalov, Zabelin (L) og] 
Shakhtyor Stalino             0-1  CSK MO Moskva 
  [Vasiliy Buzunov 40] 
[Sep 9] 
TORPEDO Moskva                6-1  Dinamo Tbilisi 
  [Eduard Streltsov 6, 16, 33, ?, 71, Slava Metreveli ? – Nikolai Senyukov (T) 47 og]

==== Semifinals ====
[Oct 19] 
LOKOMOTIV Moskva              1-0  CSK MO Moskva 
  [Valentin Bubukin 6] 
[Oct 20] 
SPARTAK Moskva                1-0  Torpedo Moskva 
  [Nikita Simonyan 59]

==== Final ====
26 October 1957

Lokomotiv Moscow	1 – 0	Spartak Moscow
Bubukin 19'	[ Report]

Moscow
