= Konstantin Kvashnin =

Soviet footballer (1899–1982)

Personal information
- Full name: Konstantin Pavlovich Kvashnin
- Date of birth: 27 December 1898
- Place of birth: Moscow, Russia
- Date of death: 2 November 1982 (aged 83)
- Place of death: Moscow, Russian SFSR
- Height: 1.75 m (5 ft 9 in)
- Position: Midfielder

Youth career
- Oryol

Senior career*
Years	Team	Apps	(Gls)
1913–1921	RGO Moscow		
1922–1926	Pishcheviki Moscow		
1927	Pishcheviki-ml. Moscow		
1928–1934	FC Dynamo Moscow		

Managerial career
- 1928–1934: FC Dynamo Moscow (assistant)
- 1935–1936: FC Dynamo Moscow
- 1937–1938: FC Spartak Moscow
- 1939–1940: FC Torpedo Moscow
- 1941: Profsoyuzy-II Moscow
- 1943: FC Zenit Moscow
- 1944: FC Spartak Moscow
- 1946: FC Pishchevik Moscow
- 1947: FC Spartak Moscow (assistant)
- 1948: FC Spartak Moscow
- 1949: FC Khimik Orekhovo-Zuyevo
- 1949–1950: FC Torpedo Moscow
- 1952: FC Shakhtyor Stalino
- * Club domestic league appearances and goals

Konstantin Pavlovich Kvashnin (Russian: Константин Павлович Квашнин; 27 December 1898 – 2 November 1982) was a Soviet Russian football player and manager who managed FC Dynamo Moscow to a championship in the first ever Soviet Top League competition in 1936.

== Honours as a manager ==
- Soviet Top League champion: 1936 (spring), 1938.
- Soviet Top League runner-up: 1936 (autumn), 1937.
- Soviet Top League bronze: 1948.
- Soviet Cup winner: 1938, 1949.
