= 1969 in Soviet football =

Football in the Soviet Union
- Season: 1969

Men's football
- Class A 1. Group: Spartak Moscow
- Class A 2. Group: Spartak Ordzhonikidze
- Class B: Druzhba Maikop (Russia); Spartak Ivano-Frankovsk (Ukraine); Dila Gori (Caucasus); Traktor Pavlodar (Kazakhstan); Tashavtomash Tashkent (Central Asia)
- Soviet Cup: Karpaty Lvov

The 1969 Soviet football championship was the 37th seasons of competitive football in the Soviet Union and the 31st among teams of sports societies and factories. Spartak won the championship becoming the Soviet domestic champions for the ninth time.

== Honours ==
Competition	Winner	Runner-up
Class A 1. Group	Spartak Moscow (9)	Dinamo Kiev
Class A 2. Group	Spartak Ordzhonikidze (1)	Dnepr Dnepropetrovsk
Class B	Druzhba Maykop (Russia)	Saturn Rybinsk (Russia)
Class B	Spartak Ivano-Frankovsk (Ukraine)	Shakhter Gorlovka (Ukraine)
Class B	Dila Gori (Caucasus)	Guria Lanchkhuti (Caucasus)
Class B	Traktor Pavlodar (Kazakhstan)	Tsementnik Semipalatinsk (Kazakhstan)
Class B	Tashavtomash Tashkent (Central Asia)	Samarkand Samarkand Oblast (Central Asia)
Soviet Cup	Karpaty Lvov (1)	SKA Rostov-na-Donu

Notes = Number in parentheses is the times that club has won that honour. * indicates new record for competition

== Soviet Union football championship ==
=== Class A First Group (second stage) ===
==== Places 1–14 ====
Pos	Team	Pld	W	D	L	GF	GA	GD	Pts	Qualification
1	(Russian Soviet Federative Socialist Republic) Spartak Moscow (C)	26	19	5	2	40	11	+29	43	Qualification for European Cup first round
2	(Ukrainian Soviet Socialist Republic) Dynamo Kyiv	26	16	7	3	37	13	+24	39	
3	(Georgian Soviet Socialist Republic) Dinamo Tbilisi	26	12	11	3	34	17	+17	35	
4	(Russian Soviet Federative Socialist Republic) Dynamo Moscow	26	12	7	7	44	28	+16	31	
5	(Russian Soviet Federative Socialist Republic) Torpedo Moscow	26	11	9	6	29	19	+10	31	
6	(Russian Soviet Federative Socialist Republic) CSKA Moscow	26	10	9	7	19	14	+5	29	
7	(Azerbaijan Soviet Socialist Republic) Neftchi Baku	26	6	11	9	26	27	−1	23	
8	(Ukrainian Soviet Socialist Republic) FC Chornomorets Odessa	26	7	7	12	17	26	−9	21	
9	(Russian Soviet Federative Socialist Republic) Zenit Leningrad	26	6	9	11	21	34	−13	21	
10	(Ukrainian Soviet Socialist Republic) Shakhtar Donetsk	26	6	8	12	20	28	−8	20	
11	(Ukrainian Soviet Socialist Republic) Zarya Voroshilovgrad	26	5	9	12	21	30	−9	19	
12	(Russian Soviet Federative Socialist Republic) SKA Rostov-on-Don	26	6	7	13	23	37	−14	19	
13	(Byelorussian Soviet Socialist Republic) Dinamo Minsk	26	5	9	12	14	31	−17	19	
14	(Georgian Soviet Socialist Republic) Torpedo Kutaisi	26	4	6	16	20	50	−30	14	

Source: rsssf.com
(C) Champions

==== Places 15–20 ====
Pos	Team	Pld	W	D	L	GF	GA	GD	Pts	Relegation
15	(Armenian Soviet Socialist Republic) Ararat Yerevan	34	13	11	10	48	40	+8	37	
16	(Uzbek Soviet Socialist Republic) Pakhtakor Tashkent	34	13	9	12	35	37	−2	35	
17	(Kazakh Soviet Socialist Republic) Kairat Alma-Ata (R)	34	12	10	12	29	31	−2	34	Relegation to Class A First Group
18	(Russian Soviet Federative Socialist Republic) Lokomotiv Moscow (R)	34	8	9	17	33	47	−14	25	Relegation to Class A First Group
19	(Russian Soviet Federative Socialist Republic) Krylya Sovetov Kuybyshev (R)	34	8	8	18	34	48	−14	24	Relegation to Class A First Group
20	(Russian Soviet Federative Socialist Republic) Ural Sverdlovsk Oblast (R)	34	7	8	19	19	39	−20	22	Relegation to Class A First Group

Source: rsssf.com
(R) Relegated

=== Class A Second Group finals ===
==== For places 1-4 ====
[Oct 31 - Nov 6, Simferopol]

Pos	Rep	Team	Pld	W	D	L	GF	GA	GD	Pts	Promotion
1	RUS	Spartak Orjonikidze	3	2	0	1	4	2	+2	4	Promoted
2	UKR	Dnepr Dnepropetrovsk	3	1	1	1	2	3	−1	3	
3	RUS	SKA Khabarovsk	3	1	1	1	1	2	−1	3	
4	LTU	Žalgiris Vilnius	3	1	0	2	2	2	0	2	

Source: rsssf.com

=== Class B ===
==== Russian Federation finals ====
[Oct 28 – Nov 10, Maykop]

Pos	Team	Pld	W	D	L	GF	GA	GD	Pts
1	Druzhba Maykop	5	3	2	0	7	2	+5	8
1	Saturn Rybinsk	5	4	0	1	10	6	+4	8
3	Iskra Smolensk	5	3	0	2	6	4	+2	6
4	Cement Novorossiysk	5	1	2	2	5	6	−1	4
5	Shakhtyor Kiselyovsk	5	1	1	3	3	6	−3	3
6	Narzan Kislovodsk	5	0	1	4	5	12	−7	1

Play-off for 1st place

Druzhba Maykop  1-0  Saturn Rybinsk

==== Ukraine finals ====
[Oct 25 – Nov 2, Ivano-Frankovsk]

Pos	Team	Pld	W	D	L	GF	GA	GD	Pts
1	Spartak Ivano-Frankovsk	5	4	1	0	9	3	+6	9
2	Shakhtyor Gorlovka	5	3	1	1	5	2	+3	7
3	Spartak Sumy	5	3	0	2	5	5	0	6
4	Karpaty Mukachevo	6	2	1	3	6	5	+1	5
5	Prometei Dneprodzerzhinsk	5	1	0	4	3	7	−4	2
6	Shakhtyor Sverdlovsk	5	0	1	4	2	8	−6	1

==== Caucasus ====
Pos	Rep	Team	Pld	W	D	L	GF	GA	GD	Pts
1	GEO	Dila Gori	38	20	14	4	70	24	+46	54
2	GEO	Guria Lanchkhuti	38	21	7	10	54	30	+24	49
3	ARM	Avtomobilist Yerevan	38	21	7	10	56	35	+21	49
4	GEO	Mertskhali Makharadze	38	18	11	9	55	28	+27	47
5	GEO	Metallurg Rustavi	38	15	16	7	53	32	+21	46
6	AZE	Textilshchik Mingechaur	38	16	10	12	53	48	+5	42
7	ARM	Lori Kirovakan	38	17	5	16	40	39	+1	39
8	GEO	Kakheti Telavi (Note: Nadikvari Telavi changed name to Kakheti.)	38	15	8	15	47	48	−1	38
9	ARM	Lernagorts Kafan	38	18	2	18	44	67	−23	38
10	GEO	Alazani Gurjaani	38	13	11	14	34	36	−2	37
11	GEO	Shukura Kobuleti	38	14	7	17	39	41	−2	35
12	AZE	Dashgin Zakatali	38	13	9	16	36	58	−22	35
13	ARM	Sevan Oktemberyan	38	12	10	16	44	47	−3	34
14	GEO	Inguri Zugdidi	38	13	8	17	46	56	−10	34
15	GEO	Kolkhida Poti	38	10	13	15	32	41	−9	33
16	GEO	Magaroeli Chiatura	38	13	7	18	34	46	−12	33
17	AZE	Karabakh Stepanakert	38	10	12	16	30	46	−16	32
18	GEO	Dinamo Sukhumi	38	12	7	19	50	46	+4	31
19	GEO	Spartak Tskhinvali	38	8	13	17	30	48	−18	29
20	AZE	Araz Nahichevan	38	8	9	21	18	49	−31	25

==== Kazakhstan ====
Pos	Team	Pld	W	D	L	GF	GA	GD	Pts
1	Traktor Pavlodar	40	27	11	2	88	19	+69	65
2	Cementnik Semipalatinsk	40	24	11	5	61	24	+37	59
3	Yenbek Jezkazgan	40	24	10	6	44	20	+24	58
4	Energetik Jambul	40	21	13	6	62	29	+33	55
5	Stroitel Temirtau (Note: Metallurg Temirtau changed name to Stroitel.)	40	20	11	9	49	30	+19	51
6	ADK Alma-Ata	40	21	8	11	51	33	+18	50
7	Stroitel Rudny	40	14	17	9	36	33	+3	45
8	Irtysh Glubokoye	40	15	14	11	33	26	+7	44
9	Dinamo Tselinograd	40	16	11	13	48	37	+11	43
10	Avtomobilist Kustanay	40	14	15	11	32	28	+4	43
11	Khimik Stepnogorsk (Note: Aray Stepnogorsk changed name to Khimik.)	40	13	16	11	31	38	−7	42
12	Uralets Uralsk	40	13	15	12	40	46	−6	41
13	Leninogorets Leninogorsk	40	14	8	18	37	44	−7	36
14	Torpedo Kokchetav	40	11	10	19	32	42	−10	32
15	Metallurg Yermak	40	7	17	16	24	44	−20	31
16	Avangard Petropavlovsk	40	7	16	17	21	49	−28	30
17	Avtomobilist Kzil-Orda	40	10	6	24	31	59	−28	26
18	Ugolshchik Shakhtinsk	40	5	15	20	21	59	−38	25
19	Phosphorite Karatau	40	7	10	23	29	77	−48	24
20	Gornyak Kentau	40	5	13	22	29	59	−30	23
21	Aktyubinets Aktyubinsk (W)	40	6	5	29	19	22	−3	17

(W) Withdrawn

==== Central Asia ====
Pos	Rep	Team	Pld	W	D	L	GF	GA	GD	Pts
1	UZB	TashAvtoMash Tashkent	46	25	16	5	82	38	+44	66
2	UZB	Samarkand	46	23	15	8	70	37	+33	61
3	UZB	Yangiyer	46	22	14	10	56	35	+21	58
4	KGZ	Alay Osh	46	24	9	13	71	41	+30	57
5	UZB	SKA Tashkent	46	21	14	11	61	35	+26	56
6	TJK	Pahtakor Kurgan-Tyube	46	19	17	10	75	55	+20	55
7	UZB	Ok Oltyn Andizhan Region	46	20	15	11	57	41	+16	55
8	TKM	Irrigator Charjou	46	19	15	12	57	41	+16	53
9	UZB	Pahtaaral Gulistan	46	20	10	16	53	49	+4	50
10	UZB	Chust Namangan	46	21	8	17	49	51	−2	50
11	UZB	Andizhanets Andizhan (Note: Andizhan changed name to Andizhanets.)	46	18	12	16	61	60	+1	48
12	UZB	Dimitrovets Tashkent Region (Note: Akkurgan Tashkent Region changed name to Dimitrovets.)	46	16	14	16	45	42	+3	46
13	TKM	Kara-Kum Mary	46	14	17	15	52	56	−4	45
14	UZB	Mehnat Kokand	46	15	13	18	50	54	−4	43
15	TJK	Abremshimchi Leninabad	46	14	14	18	42	50	−8	42
16	UZB	Avtomobilist Termez (Note: Chigarachi Termaz changed name to Avtomobilist.)	46	13	16	17	48	68	−20	42
17	UZB	Metallurg Almalyk	46	14	13	19	42	42	0	41
18	UZB	Kolkhoz Narimanova Bagat	46	14	11	21	36	52	−16	39
19	KGZ	Stroitel Jalalabad	46	13	9	24	38	63	−25	35
20	UZB	Buhara (Note: Fakel Buhara changed name to Buhara.)	46	10	13	23	29	52	−23	33
21	UZB	Khimik Chirchik	46	9	15	22	37	60	−23	33
22	TJK	Vakhsh Nurek	46	7	19	20	26	51	−25	33
23	UZB	Pahtachi Gulistan	46	13	7	26	37	73	−36	33
24	UZB	Cementchi Bekabad (Note: Bekabad changed name to Cementchi Bekabad.)	46	6	18	22	36	64	−28	30

Source: rsssf.com

=== Top goalscorers ===
Class A First Group

- Vladimir Proskurin (SKA Rostov-na-Donu), Nikolay Osianin (Spartak Moscow), Dzhemal Kherhadze (Torpedo Kutaisi) – 16 goals
