= 1970 in Soviet football =

Football in the Soviet Union
- Season: 1970

Men's football
- Class A Top Group: CSKA Moscow
- Class A 1. Group: Karpaty Lvov
- Class A 2. Group: Metallurg Zaporozhye (Subgroup 1); Shinnik Yaroslavl (Subgroup 2); Kuzbass Kemerovo (Subgroup 3)
- Class B: 4 group winners (Russia); Khimik Severodonetsk (Ukraine); Tsementnik Semipalatinsk (Kazakhstan); Zarafshan Navoi (Central Asia)
- Soviet Cup: Dinamo Moscow

The 1970 Soviet football championship was the 38th seasons of competitive football in the Soviet Union and the 32nd among teams of sports societies and factories. CSKA won the championship becoming the Soviet domestic champions for the sixth time.

== Honours ==
Competition	Winner	Runner-up
Class A Top Group	CSKA Moscow (6)	Dinamo Moscow
Class A 1. Group	Karpaty Lvov (1)	Kairat Alma-Ata
Class A 2. Group	Metallurg Zaporozhye (Subgroup 1)	Tavriya Simferopol (Subgroup 1)
Class A 2. Group	Shinnik Yaroslavl (Subgroup 2)	Avtomobilist Nalchik (Subgroup 2)
Class A 2. Group	Kuzbass Kemerovo (Subgroup 3)	Spartak Yoshkar-Ola (Subgroup 3)
Class B	Motor Vladimir (Russia Group 1)	Spartak Kostroma (Russia Subgroup 1)
Class B	Terek Groznyi (Russia Group 2)	Spartak Ryazan (Russia Group 2)
Class B	Kord Balakovo (Russia Group 3)	Neftyanik Tyumen (Russia Group 3)
Class B	Sakhalin Yuzhno-Sakhalinsk (Russia Group 4)	Vulkan Petropavlovsk-Kamchatskiy (Russia Group 4)
Class B	Khimik Severodonetsk (Ukraine)	Lokomotiv Vinnitsa (Ukraine)
Class B	Tsementnik Semipalatinsk (Kazakhstan)	Traktor Pavlodar (Kazakhstan)
Class B	Zarafshan Navoi (Central Asia)	Yangiyer (Central Asia)
Soviet Cup	Dinamo Moscow (4)	Dinamo Tbilisi

Notes = Number in parentheses is the times that club has won that honour. * indicates new record for competition

== Soviet Union football championship ==
=== Class A Top Group ===
Pos	Team	Pld	W	D	L	GF	GA	GD	Pts	Qualification or relegation
1	(Russian Soviet Federative Socialist Republic) CSKA Moscow (C)	32	20	5	7	46	17	+29	45	Qualification for European Cup first round
2	(Russian Soviet Federative Socialist Republic) Dynamo Moscow	32	19	7	6	50	22	+28	45	Qualification for Cup Winners' Cup first round
3	(Russian Soviet Federative Socialist Republic) Spartak Moscow	32	12	14	6	43	25	+18	38	Qualification for UEFA Cup first round
4	(Georgian Soviet Socialist Republic) Dinamo Tbilisi	32	14	8	10	43	30	+13	36	
5	(Ukrainian Soviet Socialist Republic) Zarya Voroshilovgrad	32	10	14	8	27	25	+2	34	
6	(Russian Soviet Federative Socialist Republic) Torpedo Moscow	32	12	10	10	36	38	−2	34	
7	(Ukrainian Soviet Socialist Republic) Dynamo Kyiv	32	14	5	13	36	32	+4	33	
8	(Russian Soviet Federative Socialist Republic) SKA Rostov-on-Don	32	9	15	8	28	29	−1	33	
9	(Byelorussian Soviet Socialist Republic) Dinamo Minsk	32	11	10	11	33	29	+4	32	
10	(Ukrainian Soviet Socialist Republic) Shakhtar Donetsk	32	11	8	13	35	50	−15	30	
11	(Azerbaijan Soviet Socialist Republic) Neftchi Baku	32	9	11	12	27	28	−1	29	
12	(Armenian Soviet Socialist Republic) Ararat Yerevan	32	10	9	13	31	34	−3	29	
13	(Uzbek Soviet Socialist Republic) Pakhtakor Tashkent	32	8	12	12	28	46	−18	28	
14	(Russian Soviet Federative Socialist Republic) Zenit Leningrad	32	10	7	15	30	40	−10	27	
15	(Ukrainian Soviet Socialist Republic) Chornomorets Odessa (R)	32	8	10	14	25	38	−13	26	Relegation to First League
16	(Georgian Soviet Socialist Republic) Torpedo Kutaisi (R)	32	6	11	15	24	42	−18	23	Relegation to First League
17	(Russian Soviet Federative Socialist Republic) Spartak Ordzhonikidze (R)	32	7	8	17	31	48	−17	22	Relegation to First League

Source: rsssf.com
(C) Champions; (R) Relegated

Golden match

CSKA Moscow v Dinamo Moscow 0–0

Replay

CSKA Moscow v Dinamo Moscow 4–3

=== Class A First Group ===
Pos	Rep	Team	Pld	W	D	L	GF	GA	GD	Pts	Promotion
1	UKR	Karpaty Lvov	42	26	11	5	70	22	+48	63	Promoted
2	KAZ	Kayrat Alma-Ata	42	25	11	6	71	29	+42	61	Promoted
3	UKR	Dnepr Dnepropetrovsk	42	26	9	7	58	25	+33	61	
4	RUS	Lokomotiv Moskva	42	20	10	12	53	39	+14	50	
5	UKR	Metallist Kharkov	42	15	19	8	43	26	+17	49	
6	RUS	Dinamo Leningrad	42	19	9	14	62	49	+13	47	
7	RUS	Krylya Sovetov Kuibyshev	42	17	13	12	43	32	+11	47	
8	RUS	Rubin Kazan	42	18	10	14	36	42	−6	46	
9	KAZ	Shakhtyor Karaganda	42	15	15	12	49	43	+6	45	
10	LTU	Žalgiris Vilnius	42	15	11	16	46	40	+6	41	
11	MDA	Moldova Kishinev	42	13	15	14	40	34	+6	41	
12	RUS	Textilshchik Ivanovo	42	13	14	15	36	51	−15	40	
13	RUS	Volgar Astrakhan	42	14	11	17	38	45	−7	39	
14	RUS	UralMash Sverdlovsk	42	13	12	17	37	49	−12	38	
15	GEO	Lokomotiv Tbilisi	42	14	9	19	36	43	−7	37	
16	RUS	Kuban Krasnodar	42	11	15	16	27	45	−18	37	
17	LVA	Daugava Riga	42	11	11	20	36	50	−14	33	
18	TJK	Pamir Dushanbe (Note: Pamir Dushanbe was called Energetik.)	42	12	9	21	41	62	−21	33	
19	UKR	SKA Kiev	42	11	10	21	39	50	−11	32	
20	KGZ	Alga Frunze	42	10	12	20	34	45	−11	32	
21	RUS	SKA Khabarovsk	42	8	16	18	22	41	−19	32	
22	TKM	Stroitel Ashkhabad	42	6	8	28	22	77	−55	20	

Source: rsssf.com

=== Class A Second Group ===
==== Subgroup 1 ====
Pos	Team	Pld	W	D	L	GF	GA	GD	Pts	Promotion or relegation
1	(Ukrainian Soviet Socialist Republic) Metalurh Zaporizhia (C, P)	42	26	10	6	73	33	+40	62	Promoted
2	(Ukrainian Soviet Socialist Republic) Tavriya Simferopol	42	21	15	6	70	36	+34	57	
3	(Ukrainian Soviet Socialist Republic) Avtomobilist Zhytomyr	42	20	15	7	61	27	+34	55	
4	(Ukrainian Soviet Socialist Republic) Spartak Ivano-Frankivsk	42	18	14	10	58	53	+5	50	
5	(Ukrainian Soviet Socialist Republic) Sudnobudivnyk Mykolaiv	42	17	14	11	47	36	+11	48	
6	(Ukrainian Soviet Socialist Republic) Azovets Zhdanov	42	15	18	9	44	34	+10	48	
7	(Ukrainian Soviet Socialist Republic) Zirka Kirovohrad	42	19	9	14	48	41	+7	47	
8	(Ukrainian Soviet Socialist Republic) Bukovyna Chernivtsi	42	17	12	13	45	39	+6	46	
9	(Ukrainian Soviet Socialist Republic) Shakhtar Kadiivka	42	16	13	13	49	37	+12	45	
10	(Ukrainian Soviet Socialist Republic) Lokomotyv Kherson	42	16	12	14	60	50	+10	44	
11	(Ukrainian Soviet Socialist Republic) Desna Chernihiv	42	17	10	15	43	45	−2	44	Dissolved
12	(Ukrainian Soviet Socialist Republic) Shakhtar Horlivka	42	14	13	15	42	47	−5	41	
13	(Ukrainian Soviet Socialist Republic) Budivelnyk Poltava	42	13	13	16	33	34	−1	39	
14	(Ukrainian Soviet Socialist Republic) SKA Lviv	42	12	15	15	30	41	−11	39	
15	(Ukrainian Soviet Socialist Republic) Kryvbas Kryvyi Rih	42	12	14	16	52	48	+4	38	
16	(Byelorussian Soviet Socialist Republic) Spartak Brest	42	12	13	17	32	48	−16	37	
17	(Ukrainian Soviet Socialist Republic) Avanhard Ternopil	42	12	12	18	38	47	−9	36	
18	(Byelorussian Soviet Socialist Republic) Neman Grodno	42	11	13	18	27	48	−21	35	
19	(Russian Soviet Federative Socialist Republic) Baltika Kaliningrad	42	10	11	21	24	51	−27	31	
20	(Ukrainian Soviet Socialist Republic) SKA Odessa	42	12	6	24	34	56	−22	30	
21	(Ukrainian Soviet Socialist Republic) Spartak Sumy	42	7	14	21	31	57	−26	28	
22	(Byelorussian Soviet Socialist Republic) Gomselmash Gomel	42	7	10	25	22	55	−33	24	

(C) Champions; (P) Promoted

==== Subgroup 2 ====
Pos	Rep	Team	Pld	W	D	L	GF	GA	GD	Pts	Promotion
1	RUS	Shinnik Yaroslavl	42	24	14	4	66	31	+35	62	Promoted
2	RUS	Avtomobilist Nalchik	42	22	15	5	58	17	+41	59	
3	RUS	Volga Kalinin	42	22	11	9	57	31	+26	55	
4	RUS	Metallurg Tula	42	21	11	10	80	38	+42	53	
5	RUS	Mashuk Pyatigorsk	42	17	16	9	52	36	+16	50	
6	RUS	Dinamo Stavropol	42	15	16	11	37	38	−1	46	
7	RUS	Metallurg Lipetsk	42	17	10	15	51	48	+3	44	
8	RUS	Lokomotiv Kaluga	42	14	16	12	47	56	−9	44	
9	RUS	Trud Voronezh	42	16	11	15	56	43	+13	43	
10	GEO	Dinamo Batumi	42	14	15	13	35	40	−5	43	
11	RUS	Druzhba Maykop	42	15	12	15	36	34	+2	42	
12	RUS	Salyut Belgorod (Note: Spartak Belgorod changed name to Salyut.)	42	13	16	13	46	45	+1	42	
13	ARM	Shirak Leninakan	42	15	11	16	44	43	+1	41	
14	RUS	Torpedo Taganrog	42	13	15	14	36	43	−7	41	
15	RUS	Volga Gorkiy	42	12	15	15	47	46	+1	39	
16	RUS	Saturn Rybinsk	42	11	17	14	44	56	−12	39	
17	RUS	Dinamo Makhachkala	42	13	11	18	45	55	−10	37	
18	GEO	Dila Gori	42	13	11	18	43	56	−13	37	
19	RUS	Stal Volgograd (Note: Traktor Volgograd changed name to Stal.)	42	8	18	16	33	40	−7	34	
20	AZE	Dinamo Kirovabad	42	12	8	22	37	46	−9	32	
21	RUS	Dinamo Bryansk	42	7	11	24	34	79	−45	25	
22	AZE	Polad Sumgait	42	4	8	30	19	82	−63	16	

==== Subgroup 3 ====
Pos	Rep	Team	Pld	W	D	L	GF	GA	GD	Pts	Promotion
1	RUS	Kuzbass Kemerovo	42	24	9	9	61	37	+24	57	Promoted
2	RUS	Spartak Yoshkar-Ola	42	24	7	11	46	30	+16	55	
3	RUS	Irtysh Omsk	42	20	14	8	63	28	+35	54	
4	RUS	TomLes Tomsk	42	17	16	9	36	28	+8	50	
5	KAZ	Vostok Ust-Kamenogorsk	42	19	11	12	51	39	+12	49	
6	RUS	SKA Chita	42	19	10	13	56	35	+21	48	
7	UZB	Politotdel Tashkent Region	42	19	10	13	48	44	+4	48	
8	RUS	Zvezda Perm	42	17	13	12	49	37	+12	47	
9	RUS	Dinamo Barnaul	42	17	11	14	60	44	+16	45	
10	RUS	Luch Vladivostok	42	16	13	13	35	33	+2	45	
11	UZB	Neftyanik Fergana	42	19	7	16	56	55	+1	45	
12	RUS	Selenga Ulan-Ude	42	15	14	13	41	39	+2	44	
13	KAZ	Metallurg Chimkent	42	15	11	16	44	46	−2	41	
14	RUS	Torpedo Togliatti (Note: Khimik Togliatti changed name to Torpedo.)	42	14	12	16	39	38	+1	40	
15	RUS	Sokol Saratov	42	16	5	21	47	51	−4	37	
16	RUS	Volga Ulyanovsk	42	12	12	18	35	50	−15	36	
17	RUS	Stroitel Ufa	42	14	7	21	36	53	−17	35	
18	RUS	Avtomobilist Krasnoyarsk (Note: Rassvet Krasnoyarsk changed name to Avtomobilist.)	42	10	14	18	29	37	−8	34	
19	RUS	Lokomotiv Chelyabinsk	42	8	16	18	40	45	−5	32	
20	RUS	Aeroflot Irkutsk	42	11	9	22	28	64	−36	31	
21	RUS	Zenit Izhevsk	42	9	10	23	35	58	−23	28	
22	UZB	Traktor Tashkent (Note: TashAvtoMash Tashkent changed name to Traktor.)	42	7	9	26	27	71	−44	23	

Source: rsssf.com

=== Ranking 1-14th ===
Pos	Team	Pld	W	D	L	GF	GA	GD	Pts	Promotion
1	FC Khimik Severodonetsk (C, P)	40	23	15	2	66	20	+46	61	Promoted
2	FC Lokomotyv Vinnytsia (P)	40	22	15	3	60	17	+43	59	Promoted
3	FC Lokomotyv Donetsk (P)	40	23	9	8	66	30	+36	55	Promoted
4	FC Dynamo Khmelnytskyi (P)	40	19	13	8	49	24	+25	51	Promoted
5	FC Karpaty Mukacheve	40	19	13	8	51	36	+15	51	
6	FC Avanhard Antratsyt	40	16	14	10	30	33	−3	46	
7	FC Verkhovyna Uzhhorod (P)	40	19	7	14	36	29	+7	45	Promoted
8	FC Torpedo Lutsk (P)	40	15	14	11	35	32	+3	44	Promoted
9	FC Horyn Rovno (P)	40	14	14	12	48	41	+7	42	Promoted
10	FC Shakhtar Sverdlovsk	40	13	13	14	35	34	+1	39	
11	FC Avanhard Makiivka	40	12	13	15	33	41	−8	37	
12	FC Avanhard Kramatorsk	40	13	11	16	43	54	−11	37	
13	FC Komunarets Komunarsk	40	13	10	17	38	42	−4	36	
14	FC Avanhard Rovenky	40	11	10	19	35	57	−22	32	

(C) Champions; (P) Promoted

=== Ranking 15-27th ===
Pos	Team	Pld	W	D	L	GF	GA	GD	Pts	Promotion
15	FC Dnipro Cherkasy (P)	40	15	14	11	49	42	+7	44	Promoted
16	FC Avanhard Zhovti Vody	40	15	12	13	34	26	+8	42	
17	FC Shakhtar Chervonohrad	40	15	11	14	35	33	+2	41	
18	FC Enerhiya Nova Kakhovka	40	16	9	15	43	43	0	41	
19	FC Shakhtar Kirovsk	40	15	11	14	34	47	−13	41	
20	FC Naftovyk Drohobych	40	15	8	17	40	51	−11	38	
21	FC Trubnyk Nikopol	40	11	15	14	26	32	−6	37	
22	FC Torpedo Berdyansk	40	13	11	16	28	41	−13	37	
23	SKCF Sevastopol	40	13	9	18	33	43	−10	35	
24	FC Shakhtar Oleksandriya	40	11	12	17	33	46	−13	34	
25	FC Shakhtar Krasnyi Luch	40	9	13	18	19	52	−33	31	
26	FC Podillya Kamianets-Podilskyi	40	10	10	20	29	48	−19	30	
27	FC Shakhtar Torez	40	7	12	21	16	44	−28	26	

(P) Promoted

=== Top goalscorers ===
Class A Top Group

- Givi Nodia (Dinamo Tbilisi) – 17 goals

Class A First Group

- Yanosh Gobovda (Karpaty Lvov) – 24 goals
