= 1969 Soviet Class A Second Group =

Football league season

Class A Second Group
- Season: 1969
- Champions: FC Spartak Ordzhonikidze FC SKA Khabarovsk FC Dnepr Dnepropetrovsk FK Žalgiris Vilnius
- Promoted: FC Spartak Ordzhonikidze
- European Cup Winners' Cup: FC Karpaty Lvov

The 1969 Soviet Football Championship of the Class A Second Group (Russian: Чемпионат СССР 1969 года во второй группе класса «А») was the seventh season of the Class A Second Group that was established in 1963. It was also the 29th season of the Soviet second tier league competition. The season started on April 1, 1969, with the Round 1 games in Group 4. The season ended with the last round of the Final stage played on November 6, 1969.

In August of 1969, Karpaty Lvov won the Football Cup of the Soviet Union (a parallel elimination tournament), thus qualifying for the 1970–71 European Cup Winners' Cup. Karpaty became the only Soviet team of masters that qualified for the continental competition while playing in the second tier of the Soviet football league pyramid.

== Format ==
The competition involved participation of 87 clubs split in four groups by geographic principle with 2 groups consisting of only teams only from Russian SFSR, one group consisting of teams from Ukrainian SSR, and the other group involved teams from other union republics of the Soviet Union. Three groups conducted their competitions in simple double round-robin format, while one group was split in two subgroups which had double round-robin format and after that each subgroup was split in half with best teams from each playing with best teams of other subgroup, and worst teams from each subgroup playing with worst teams of other subgroup. At the end all winners from each of the four groups qualified for the final stage where teams played each other in single round-robin tournament. The best team out of 87 received promotion to the 1970 Class A Top Group (predecessor of the Top League).

For the next season, the Class A Second Group was to be renamed as the Class A First Group and its composition reduced. For that reason, only 18 teams preserved their place for the next season with 68 teams being either relegated or withdrawn.

== First stage ==
=== Subgroup 1 (Russia) ===
==== Teams ====
===== Promoted =====
- Dinamo Bryansk
- Spartak Belgorod
- Mashuk Pyatigorsk

===== Renamed =====
- Avtomobilist Nalchik was called Spartak Nalchik

==== Subgroup 1 table ====
Pos	Team	Pld	W	D	L	GF	GA	GD	Pts	
1	Spartak Orjonikidze	38	22	12	4	60	25	+35	56	Final stage
2	Dinamo Leningrad	38	23	8	7	59	27	+32	54	
3	Kuban Krasnodar	38	14	17	7	31	24	+7	45	
4	Textilshchik Ivanovo	38	15	14	9	34	20	+14	44	
5	Metallurg Tula	38	12	19	7	36	25	+11	43	Relegated to the Class A Second Group
6	Shinnik Yaroslavl	38	16	11	11	40	34	+6	43	Relegated to the Class A Second Group
7	Metallurg Lipetsk	38	10	19	9	36	33	+3	39	Relegated to the Class A Second Group
8	Dinamo Makhachkala	38	11	14	13	35	32	+3	36	Relegated to the Class A Second Group
9	Volga Kalinin	38	12	12	14	36	39	−3	36	Relegated to the Class A Second Group
10	Baltika Kaliningrad	38	9	18	11	34	43	−9	36	Relegated to the Class A Second Group
11	Torpedo Taganrog	38	10	15	13	37	43	−6	35	Relegated to the Class A Second Group
12	Dinamo Stavropol	38	8	18	12	32	32	0	34	Relegated to the Class A Second Group
13	RostSelMash Rostov-na-Donu	38	14	6	18	39	40	−1	34	Relegated to the Class A Second Group
14	Dinamo Bryansk	38	11	12	15	26	43	−17	34	Relegated to the Class A Second Group
15	Avtomobilist Nalchik	38	12	9	17	37	43	−6	33	Relegated to the Class A Second Group
16	Trud Voronezh	38	7	18	13	27	36	−9	32	Relegated to the Class A Second Group
17	Spartak Belgorod	38	11	10	17	32	43	−11	32	Relegated to the Class A Second Group
18	Mashuk Pyatigorsk	38	10	12	16	31	43	−12	32	Relegated to the Class A Second Group
19	Lokomotiv Kaluga	38	10	11	17	25	42	−17	31	Relegated to the Class A Second Group
20	Terek Grozny	38	10	11	17	28	48	−20	31	Relegated to the Class B

=== Subgroup 2 (Russia) ===
==== Teams ====
===== Promoted =====
- Kalininets Sverdlovsk

===== Renamed =====
- Dinamo Barnaul was called Temp Barnaul

==== First Zone ====
Pos	Team	Pld	W	D	L	GF	GA	GD	Pts
1	SKA Khabarovsk	22	12	7	3	36	20	+16	31
2	Kuzbass Kemerovo	22	12	5	5	34	22	+12	29
3	Selenga Ulan-Ude	22	8	9	5	18	15	+3	25
4	Aeroflot Irkutsk	22	8	8	6	29	17	+12	24
5	TomLes Tomsk	22	7	9	6	15	17	−2	23
6	Kalininets Sverdlovsk	22	8	7	7	19	20	−1	23
7	SKA Chita	22	7	9	6	17	19	−2	23
8	Lokomotiv Chelyabinsk	22	8	6	8	18	18	0	22
9	Irtysh Omsk	22	7	7	8	21	21	0	21
10	Luch Vladivostok	22	3	9	10	12	29	−17	15
11	Rassvet Krasnoyarsk	22	2	10	10	11	21	−10	14
12	Dinamo Barnaul	22	5	4	13	17	28	−11	14

==== Second Zone ====
Pos	Team	Pld	W	D	L	GF	GA	GD	Pts
1	Metallurg Kuibyshev	22	11	7	4	32	12	+20	29
2	Rubin Kazan	22	10	9	3	27	15	+12	29
3	Sokol Saratov	22	12	3	7	34	21	+13	27
4	Volga Gorkiy	22	10	7	5	22	16	+6	27
5	Volgar Astrakhan	22	10	5	7	25	20	+5	25
6	Spartak Yoshkar-Ola	22	9	6	7	20	25	−5	24
7	Zvezda Perm	22	8	4	10	22	20	+2	20
8	Traktor Volgograd	22	8	4	10	18	26	−8	20
9	Zenit Izhevsk	22	7	3	12	26	37	−11	17
10	Volga Ulyanovsk	22	4	8	10	15	22	−7	16
11	Metallurg Magnitogorsk	22	5	6	11	16	30	−14	16
12	Stroitel Ufa	22	3	8	11	14	27	−13	14

==== For places 1-12 ====
Pos	Team	Pld	W	D	L	GF	GA	GD	Pts	
1	SKA Khabarovsk	22	11	7	4	33	17	+16	29	Final stage
2	Rubin Kazan	22	10	8	4	22	13	+9	28	
3	Metallurg Kuibyshev	22	10	6	6	31	16	+15	26	Merged with Krylia Sovetov Kuibyshev
4	Volgar Astrakhan	22	9	7	6	24	26	−2	25	
5	Sokol Saratov	22	10	4	8	31	21	+10	24	Relegated to the Class A Second Group
6	Volga Gorkiy	22	8	6	8	24	27	−3	22	Relegated to the Class A Second Group
7	Kuzbass Kemerovo	22	7	7	8	20	26	−6	21	Relegated to the Class A Second Group
8	Aeroflot Irkutsk	22	5	9	8	26	26	0	19	Relegated to the Class A Second Group
9	TomLes Tomsk	22	6	7	9	17	22	−5	19	Relegated to the Class A Second Group
10	Spartak Yoshkar-Ola	22	5	9	8	14	27	−13	19	Relegated to the Class A Second Group
11	Kalininets Sverdlovsk	22	6	5	11	25	35	−10	17	Relegated to the Class A Second Group
12	Selenga Ulan-Ude	22	4	7	11	17	28	−11	15	Relegated to the Class A Second Group

==== For places 13-24 ====
Pos	Team	Pld	W	D	L	GF	GA	GD	Pts	
13	Irtysh Omsk	34	13	10	11	33	30	+3	36	Relegated to the Class A Second Group
14	SKA Chita	34	11	14	9	28	31	−3	36	Relegated to the Class A Second Group
15	Lokomotiv Chelyabinsk	34	13	8	13	26	27	−1	34	Relegated to the Class A Second Group
16	Traktor Volgograd	34	13	7	14	34	37	−3	33	Relegated to the Class A Second Group
17	Luch Vladivostok	34	10	12	12	28	39	−11	32	Relegated to the Class A Second Group
18	Rassvet Krasnoyarsk	34	8	13	13	24	32	−8	29	Relegated to the Class A Second Group
19	Zenit Izhevsk	34	11	6	17	40	51	−11	28	Relegated to the Class A Second Group
20	Zvezda Perm	34	10	7	17	29	32	−3	27	Relegated to the Class A Second Group
21	Stroitel Ufa	34	7	12	15	28	40	−12	26	Relegated to the Class A Second Group
22	Volga Ulyanovsk	34	7	12	15	22	35	−13	26	Relegated to the Class A Second Group
23	Dinamo Barnaul	34	9	7	18	30	41	−11	25	Relegated to the Class A Second Group
24	Metallurg Magnitogorsk	34	8	8	18	22	40	−18	24	Relegated to the Class B

=== Subgroup 3 (Ukraine) ===
==== Teams ====
===== Promoted =====
- Bukovina Chernovtsy
- Avangard Ternopol
- Desna Chernigov
- Shakhter Kadievka
- Dinamo Khmelnitskiy

===== Renamed =====
- Stroitel Poltava was called Selstroi Poltava

==== Subgroup 3 table ====
Pos	Team	Pld	W	D	L	GF	GA	GD	Pts	
1	Dnepr Dnepropetrovsk	42	24	9	9	73	39	+34	57	Final stage
2	SKA Kiev	42	18	16	8	51	30	+21	52	
3	Metallist Kharkov	42	19	14	9	40	27	+13	52	
4	Avtomobilist Zhitomir	42	21	9	12	57	31	+26	51	Relegated to the Class A Second Group
5	Zvezda Kirovograd	42	20	11	11	43	30	+13	51	Relegated to the Class A Second Group
6	Karpaty Lvov	42	17	12	13	63	50	+13	46	Qualification for European Cup Winners' Cup
7	Metallurg Zaporozhye	42	15	14	13	49	35	+14	44	Relegated to the Class A Second Group
8	Tavria Simferopol	42	14	16	12	60	49	+11	44	Relegated to the Class A Second Group
9	Bukovina Chernovtsy	42	16	12	14	32	33	−1	44	Relegated to the Class A Second Group
10	Stroitel Poltava	42	14	15	13	34	33	+1	43	Relegated to the Class A Second Group
11	Lokomotiv Kherson	42	13	15	14	42	38	+4	41	Relegated to the Class A Second Group
12	Sudostroitel Nikolayev	42	14	13	15	38	35	+3	41	Relegated to the Class A Second Group
13	SKA Lvov	42	14	11	17	40	47	−7	39	Relegated to the Class A Second Group
14	Avangard Ternopol	42	11	17	14	32	41	−9	39	Relegated to the Class A Second Group
15	Krivbass Krivoi Rog	42	13	10	19	41	52	−11	36	Relegated to the Class A Second Group
16	Azovets Zhdanov	42	12	12	18	40	52	−12	36	Relegated to the Class A Second Group
17	SKA Odessa	42	13	10	19	36	55	−19	36	Relegated to the Class A Second Group
18	Desna Chernigov	42	11	14	17	30	59	−29	36	Relegated to the Class A Second Group
19	Shakhtyor Kadiyevka	42	11	13	18	29	49	−20	35	Relegated to the Class A Second Group
20	Lokomotiv Vinnitsa	42	8	18	16	37	49	−12	34	Relegated to the Class B
21	Dinamo Khmelnitskiy	42	9	16	17	32	47	−15	34	Relegated to the Class B
22	Khimik Severodonetsk	42	11	11	20	40	58	−18	33	Relegated to the Class B

=== Subgroup 4 (Union rep) ===
==== Teams ====
===== Relegated =====
- Dinamo Kirovobad

===== Promoted =====
- Spartak Brest

==== Subgroup 4 table ====
Pos	Rep	Team	Pld	W	D	L	GF	GA	GD	Pts	
1	LTU	Žalgiris Vilnius	40	21	11	8	50	21	+29	53	Final stage
2	KAZ	Shakhtyor Karaganda	40	19	12	9	47	23	+24	50	
3	GEO	Lokomotiv Tbilisi	40	19	11	10	49	29	+20	49	
4	TJK	Energetik Dushanbe	40	16	17	7	44	31	+13	49	
5	TKM	Stroitel Ashkhabad	40	16	12	12	50	35	+15	44	
6	MDA	Moldova Kishinev	40	14	16	10	36	23	+13	44	
7	GEO	Dinamo Batumi	40	14	15	11	37	31	+6	43	Relegated to the Class A Second Group
8	UZB	Neftyanik Fergana	40	16	10	14	39	47	−8	42	Relegated to the Class A Second Group
9	KGZ	Alga Frunze	40	12	17	11	25	25	0	41	
10	UZB	Politotdel Tashkent Region	40	13	15	12	33	38	−5	41	Relegated to the Class A Second Group
11	KAZ	Vostok Ust-Kamenogorsk	40	12	15	13	38	36	+2	39	Relegated to the Class A Second Group
12	LVA	Daugava Riga	40	10	18	12	41	37	+4	38	
13	BLR	Spartak Brest	40	12	13	15	30	29	+1	37	Relegated to the Class A Second Group
14	BLR	Neman Grodno	40	7	23	10	27	27	0	37	Relegated to the Class A Second Group
15	AZE	Dinamo Kirovabad	40	12	13	15	34	43	−9	37	Relegated to the Class A Second Group
16	AZE	Polad Sumgait	40	9	18	13	36	40	−4	36	Relegated to the Class A Second Group
17	UZB	Zarafshan Navoi	40	13	9	18	41	49	−8	35	Relegated to the Class A Second Group
18	GEO	Meshakhte Tkibuli	40	14	7	19	34	47	−13	35	Relegated to the Class B
19	KAZ	Metallurg Chimkent	40	11	11	18	33	45	−12	33	Relegated to the Class A Second Group
20	ARM	Shirak Leninakan	40	11	10	19	36	67	−31	32	Relegated to the Class A Second Group
21	TJK	Pamir Leninabad	40	7	11	22	31	68	−37	25	Relegated to the Class A Second Group

==== Number of teams by republics ====
Number	Union republics	Team(s)
3	Kazakh SSR	FC Shakher Karaganda, FC Vostok Ust-Kamenogorsk, FC Metallurg Chimkent
3	Georgian SSR	FC Lokomotiv Tbilisi, FC Dinamo Batumi, FC Meshakhte Tkibuli
3	Uzbek SSR	FC Neftyanik Fergana, FC Politotdel Tashkent Region, FC Zarafshan Navoi
2	Tajik SSR	FC Energetik Dushanbe, FC Pamir Leninabad
2	Belarusian SSR	FC Spartak Brest, FC Neman Grodno
2	Azerbaijan SSR	FC Dinamo Kirovobad, FC Polad Sumgait
1	Lithuanian SSR	FK Žalgiris Vilnius
1	Turkmen SSR	FC Stroitel Ashkhabad
1	Moldavian SSR	FC Moldova Kishinev
1	Kyrgyz SSR	FC Alga Frunze
1	Latvian SSR	FC Daugava Riga
1	Armenian SSR	FC Shirak Leninakan

== Final stage ==
=== For places 1-4 ===
[Oct 31 - Nov 6, Simferopol]

Pos	Rep	Team	Pld	W	D	L	GF	GA	GD	Pts	Promotion
1	RUS	Spartak Orjonikidze	3	2	0	1	4	2	+2	4	Promoted
2	UKR	Dnepr Dnepropetrovsk	3	1	1	1	2	3	−1	3	
3	RUS	SKA Khabarovsk	3	1	1	1	1	2	−1	3	
4	LTU	Žalgiris Vilnius	3	1	0	2	2	2	0	2	

Source: rsssf.com

== See also ==
- Soviet First League
