= 1971 in Soviet football =

Football in the Soviet Union
- Season: 1971

Men's football
- Top League: Dinamo Kiev
- First League: Dnepr Dnepropetrovsk
- Second League: Zvezda Perm
- Soviet Cup: Spartak Moscow

The 1971 Soviet football championship was the 39th seasons of competitive football in the Soviet Union and the 33rd among teams of sports societies and factories. Dinamo Kiev won the championship becoming the Soviet domestic champions for the fifth time.

== Honours ==
Competition	Winner	Runner-up
Top League	Dinamo Kiev (5)	Ararat Yerevan
First League	Dnepr Dnepropetrovsk (1)	Lokomotiv Moscow
Second League	Zvezda Perm	Avtomobilist Nalchik
Soviet Cup	Spartak Moscow (9*)	SKA Rostov-na-Donu

Notes = Number in parentheses is the times that club has won that honour. * indicates new record for competition

== Soviet Union football championship ==
=== Top League ===
Pos	Team	Pld	W	D	L	GF	GA	GD	Pts	Qualification or relegation
1	(Ukrainian Soviet Socialist Republic) Dynamo Kyiv (C)	30	17	10	3	41	17	+24	44	Qualification for European Cup first round
2	(Armenian Soviet Socialist Republic) Ararat Yerevan	30	13	11	6	37	28	+9	37	Qualification for UEFA Cup first round
3	(Georgian Soviet Socialist Republic) Dinamo Tbilisi	30	14	8	8	33	33	0	36	Qualification for UEFA Cup first round
4	(Ukrainian Soviet Socialist Republic) Zarya Voroshilovgrad	30	11	11	8	29	23	+6	33	
5	(Russian Soviet Federative Socialist Republic) Dynamo Moscow	30	9	13	8	35	22	+13	31	
6	(Russian Soviet Federative Socialist Republic) Spartak Moscow	30	9	13	8	35	31	+4	31	Qualification for Cup Winners' Cup first round
7	(Russian Soviet Federative Socialist Republic) Torpedo Moscow	30	4	20	6	27	27	0	28	
8	(Kazakh Soviet Socialist Republic) Kairat Alma-Ata	30	9	10	11	36	40	−4	28	
9	(Azerbaijan Soviet Socialist Republic) Neftchi Baku	30	9	10	11	30	34	−4	28	
10	(Ukrainian Soviet Socialist Republic) Karpaty Lviv	30	5	18	7	30	35	−5	28	
11	(Byelorussian Soviet Socialist Republic) Dinamo Minsk	30	8	12	10	36	43	−7	28	
12	(Russian Soviet Federative Socialist Republic) CSKA Moscow	30	7	12	11	34	36	−2	26	
13	(Russian Soviet Federative Socialist Republic) Zenit Leningrad	30	8	10	12	29	32	−3	26	
14	(Russian Soviet Federative Socialist Republic) SKA Rostov-on-Don	30	9	8	13	35	43	−8	26	
15	(Tajik Soviet Socialist Republic) Pakhtakor Tashkent (R)	30	8	10	12	29	46	−17	26	Relegation to First League
16	(Ukrainian Soviet Socialist Republic) Shakhtar Donetsk (R)	30	10	4	16	31	37	−6	24	Relegation to First League

Source: rsssf.com
(C) Champions; (R) Relegated

=== First League ===
Pos	Rep	Team	Pld	W	D	L	GF	GA	GD	Pts	Promotion or relegation
1	UKR	Dnepr Dnepropetrovsk	42	27	9	6	83	30	+53	63	Promoted
2	RUS	Lokomotiv Moskva	42	25	12	5	81	33	+48	62	Promoted
3	UKR	Chernomorets Odessa	42	21	11	10	56	33	+23	53	
4	UKR	Metallurg Zaporozhye	42	16	14	12	51	39	+12	46	
5	RUS	Spartak Orjonikidze	42	19	7	16	52	57	−5	45	
6	RUS	Krylya Sovetov Kuibyshev	42	17	9	16	54	41	+13	43	
7	RUS	Textilshchik Ivanovo	42	14	15	13	45	43	+2	43	
8	UKR	Metallist Kharkov	42	18	7	17	50	49	+1	43	
9	KAZ	Shakhtyor Karaganda	42	14	13	15	46	47	−1	41	
10	RUS	Dinamo Leningrad	42	14	12	16	35	40	−5	40	
11	GEO	Torpedo Kutaisi	42	12	15	15	47	53	−6	39	
12	RUS	UralMash Sverdlovsk	42	13	13	16	34	40	−6	39	
13	TKM	Stroitel Ashkhabad	42	16	7	19	53	62	−9	39	
14	RUS	Shinnik Yaroslavl	42	16	7	19	42	52	−10	39	
15	TJK	Pamir Dushanbe	42	16	7	19	42	54	−12	39	
16	KGZ	Alga Frunze	42	13	12	17	45	52	−7	38	
17	MDA	Moldova Kishinev	42	12	14	16	35	42	−7	38	
18	RUS	Kuzbass Kemerovo	42	14	10	18	49	57	−8	38	Relegated
19	LVA	Daugava Riga	42	10	16	16	23	34	−11	36	Relegated
20	LTU	Žalgiris Vilnius	42	9	17	16	30	45	−15	35	Relegated
21	RUS	Volgar Astrakhan	42	8	18	16	34	58	−24	34	Relegated
22	RUS	Rubin Kazan	42	9	13	20	31	57	−26	31	Relegated

Source: rsssf.com

=== Second League (finals) ===
[Oct 31 – Nov 12, Sochi]

Pos	Rep	Team	Pld	W	D	L	GF	GA	GD	Pts	Promotion
1	RUS	Zvezda Perm	4	3	1	0	6	2	+4	7	Promoted
2	RUS	Avtomobilist Nalchik	4	1	3	0	2	1	+1	5	Promoted
3	RUS	Iskra Smolensk	4	1	2	1	2	3	−1	4	Additional Play-Off
4	RUS	Metallurg Lipetsk	4	1	1	2	3	4	−1	3	
5	KAZ	Spartak Semipalatinsk	4	0	1	3	2	5	−3	1	

Source: rsssf.com

Additional Play-Off

[Nov 20, 24]

Team 1	Agg.	Team 2	1st leg	2nd leg
KRIVBASS Krivoi Rog	5-1	Iskra Smolensk	3-1	2-0

=== Top goalscorers ===
Top League

- Eduard Malofeyev (Dinamo Minsk) – 16 goals

First League

- Vitaliy Razdayev (Kuzbass Kemerovo) – 24 goals
