= Dzhemal Kherhadze =

Soviet Georgian footballer and coach (1945–2019)

Personal information
- Full name: Dzhemal Noyevich Kherhadze
- Date of birth: 2 February 1945
- Place of birth: Kutaisi, Georgian SSR
- Date of death: 11 March 2019 (aged 74)
- Height: 1.72 m (5 ft 7 1/2 in)
- Position: Forward

Youth career
- FC Torpedo Kutaisi

Senior career*
Years	Team	Apps	(Gls)
1960–1961	FC Imereti Kutaisi (amateur)		
1962–1978	FC Torpedo Kutaisi	337	(82)

Managerial career
- 1981–1983: FC Torpedo Kutaisi (assistant)
- 1985–1986: FC Meshakhte Tkibuli
- 1987–1996: FC Torpedo Kutaisi (assistant)
- 1996: FC Torpedo Kutaisi
- * Club domestic league appearances and goals

Dzhemal Noyevich Kherhadze (Russian: Джемал Ноевич Херхадзе; 2 February 1945 – 11 March 2019) was a Soviet Georgian football player and coach.

He was most notable as the co-top scorer of the 1969 Soviet Top League with 16 goals. He was not awarded the top scorer prize as the Trud newspaper which was awarding said prize suspected that the last game of the season, in which he scored a hat-trick to catch up to Nikolai Osyanin on the scorers list, was fixed (his team FC Torpedo Kutaisi played FC SKA Rostov-on-Don with a score of 3-3, SKA's Vladimir Proskurin, who also scored a hat-trick to catch up with Osyanin, was not awarded the prize either). Formally the decision was justified by Osyanin scoring in "more important" games.
