= Vladimir Proskurin =

Russian footballer (1945–2020)

Personal information
- Full name: Vladimir Grigoryevich Proskurin
- Date of birth: 24 January 1945
- Place of birth: Voronezh, Russian SFSR
- Date of death: 19 July 2020 (aged 75)
- Height: 1.80 m (5 ft 11 in)
- Position: Forward

Youth career
- 1960–1962: FC Trud Voronezh

Senior career*
| Years | Team | Apps | (Gls) |
| 1963 | FC Energiya Voronezh | 20 | (7) |
| 1964–1968 | FC Trud Voronezh | 142 | (62) |
| 1969–1970 | FC SKA Rostov-on-Don | 41 | (22) |
| 1970 | FC Spartak Moscow | 7 | (4) |
| 1971–1978 | FC Fakel Voronezh | 239 | (120) |

Managerial career
- 1980–1981: FC Fakel Voronezh (assistant)
- 1981: FC Fakel Voronezh
- 1982–1983: FC Strela Voronezh
- 1991–1994: FC Irgiz Balakovo
- * Club domestic league appearances and goals

Vladimir Grigoryevich Proskurin (Russian: Владимир Григорьевич Проскурин; 24 January 1945 – 19 July 2020) was a Soviet Russian football player and coach.

He is most notable as the co-top scorer of the 1969 Soviet Top League with 16 goals. He was not awarded the top scorer prize as the Trud newspaper which was awarding said prize suspected that the last game of the season, in which he scored a hat-trick to catch up to Nikolai Osyanin on the scorers list, was fixed (his team FC SKA Rostov-on-Don played FC Torpedo Kutaisi with a score of 3-3, Kutaisi's Dzhemal Kherhadze, who also scored a hat-trick to catch up with Osyanin, was not awarded the prize either). Formally the decision was justified by Osyanin scoring in "more important" games.
