= 1970 Soviet Class A First Group =

Soviet Class A First Group
- Season: 1970
- Promoted: FC Karpaty Lvov FC Kairat Alma-Ata
- Relegated: FC Lokomotiv Tbilisi FC Kuban Krasnodar SKA Kiev FC SKA Khabarovsk

The 1970 Soviet Class A First Group was a transitional season of the future Soviet First League. It was also the 30th season of the Soviet second tier league competition.

The league was reduced to a single group in comparison with the previous season.

== Teams ==
=== Relegated teams ===
- FC Kairat Alma-Ata – placing 17th in 1969 Class A First Group, (Returning after 4 seasons)
- FC Lokomotiv Moscow – placing 18th in 1969 Class A First Group, (Returning after 5 seasons)
- FC Krylia Sovetov Kiubyshev – placing 19th in 1969 Class A First Group, (Returning after 8 seasons)
- FC Uralmash Sverdlovsk – placing 20th (last) in 1969 Class A First Group, (Returning after a season)

=== Renamed teams ===
- Energetik Dushanbe was renamed as Pamir Dushanbe.

== Final standings ==
Pos	Rep	Team	Pld	W	D	L	GF	GA	GD	Pts	Promotion
1	UKR	(Ukrainian Soviet Socialist Republic) Karpaty Lviv	42	26	11	5	70	22	+48	63	Promoted to Top League
2	KAZ	(Kazakh Soviet Socialist Republic) Kayrat Alma-Ata	42	25	11	6	71	29	+42	61	Promoted to Top League
3	UKR	(Ukrainian Soviet Socialist Republic) Dnipro Dnipropetrovsk	42	26	9	7	58	25	+33	61	
4	RUS	(Russian Soviet Federative Socialist Republic) Lokomotiv Moscow	42	20	10	12	53	39	+14	50	
5	UKR	(Ukrainian Soviet Socialist Republic) Metallist Kharkiv	42	15	19	8	43	26	+17	49	
6	RUS	(Russian Soviet Federative Socialist Republic) Dinamo Leningrad	42	19	9	14	62	49	+13	47	
7	RUS	(Russian Soviet Federative Socialist Republic) Krylia Sovetov Kuibyshev	42	17	13	12	43	32	+11	47	
8	RUS	(Russian Soviet Federative Socialist Republic) Rubin Kazan	42	18	10	14	36	42	−6	46	
9	KAZ	(Kazakh Soviet Socialist Republic) Shakhter Karagandy	42	15	15	12	49	43	+6	45	
10	LTU	(Lithuanian Soviet Socialist Republic) Žalgiris Vilnius	42	15	11	16	46	40	+6	41	
11	MDA	(Moldavian Soviet Socialist Republic) Moldova Chișinău	42	13	15	14	40	34	+6	41	
12	RUS	(Russian Soviet Federative Socialist Republic) Tekstilshchik Ivanovo	42	13	14	15	36	51	−15	40	
13	RUS	(Russian Soviet Federative Socialist Republic) Volgar Astrakhan	42	14	11	17	38	45	−7	39	
14	RUS	(Russian Soviet Federative Socialist Republic) Uralmash Sverdlovsk	42	13	12	17	37	49	−12	38	
15	GEO	(Georgian Soviet Socialist Republic) Lokomotiv Tbilisi	42	14	9	19	36	43	−7	37	Relegated to Second League
16	RUS	(Russian Soviet Federative Socialist Republic) Kuban Krasnodar	42	11	15	16	27	45	−18	37	Relegated to Second League
17	LVA	(Latvian Soviet Socialist Republic) Daugava Riga	42	11	11	20	36	50	−14	33	
18	TJK	(Tajik Soviet Socialist Republic) Pamir Dushanbe	42	12	9	21	41	62	−21	33	
19	UKR	(Ukrainian Soviet Socialist Republic) SKA Kyiv	42	11	10	21	39	50	−11	32	Relegated to Second League
20	KGZ	(Kirghiz Soviet Socialist Republic) Alga Frunze	42	10	12	20	34	45	−11	32	
21	RUS	(Russian Soviet Federative Socialist Republic) SKA Khabarovsk	42	8	16	18	22	41	−19	32	Relegated to Second League
22	TKM	(Turkmen Soviet Socialist Republic) Stroitel Ashgabat	42	6	8	28	22	77	−55	20	

Source: rsssf.com

=== Top scorers ===
24 goals

- János Gabovda (Karpaty Lvov)

19 goals

- Yury Sevidov (Kairat Alma-Ata)

18 goals

- Eugen Piunovschi (Shakhter Karaganda)

17 goals

- Viktor Abgoltz (Kairat Alma-Ata)

16 goals

- Boris Govorunov (Dinamo Leningrad)

== Number of teams by union republic ==
Rank	Union republic	Number of teams	Club(s)
1	RSFSR	9	Lokomotiv Moscow, Dinamo Leningrad, Krylia Sovetov Kuibyshev, Rubin Kazan, Tekstilschik Ivanovo, Volgar Astrakhan, Uralmash Sverdlovsk, Kuban Krasnodar, SKA Khabarovsk
2	Ukrainian SSR	4	Karpaty Lvov, Dnepr Dnepropetrovsk, Metallist Kharkov, SKA Kiev
3	Kazakh SSR	2	Kairat Alma-Ata, Shakhter Karaganda
4	Lithuanian SSR	1	Žalgiris Vilnius
4	Moldavian SSR	1	Moldova Kishinev
4	Georgian SSR	1	Lokomotivi Tbilisi
4	Latvian SSR	1	Daugava Riga
4	Tajik SSR	1	Pamir Dushanbe
4	Kyrgyz SSR	1	Alga Frunze
4	Turkmen SSR	1	Stroitel Ashkhabat

== See also ==
- Soviet First League
