= 1970 Soviet Class A Second Group =

Soviet football competition

Class A Second Group
- Season: 1970
- Champions: Group 1: Metallurg Zaporozhye; Group 2: Shinnik Yaroslavl; Group 3: Kuzbass Kemerevo
- Promoted: Metallurg Zaporozhye; Shinnik Yaroslavl; Kuzbass Kemerevo
- Relegated: Desna Chernigov; Polad Sumgait; Traktor Tashkent

The 1970 Soviet Class A Second Group was the tenth season at the third tier of football competitions in the Soviet Union.

The competitions consisted of three groups, winners of which gained direct promotion to the 1971 Soviet First League. Those were Metallurg Zaporozhye, Shinnik Yaroslavl, and Kuzbass Kemerevo.

In addition to that there was conducted a side tournament for the Russian SFSR clubs for the republican title. Only two best teams of the Russian SFSR from Groups 2 and 3 qualified for that competition. At same time Metallurg Zaporozhye was honored as the Champion of the Ukrainian SSR by the Football Federation of the Ukrainian SSR.

== Qualifying groups ==
=== Group I [Ukraine and Belarus] ===
Pos	Team	Pld	W	D	L	GF	GA	GD	Pts	Promotion or relegation
1	(Ukrainian Soviet Socialist Republic) Metalurh Zaporizhia (C, P)	42	26	10	6	73	33	+40	62	Promoted
2	(Ukrainian Soviet Socialist Republic) Tavriya Simferopol	42	21	15	6	70	36	+34	57	
3	(Ukrainian Soviet Socialist Republic) Avtomobilist Zhytomyr	42	20	15	7	61	27	+34	55	
4	(Ukrainian Soviet Socialist Republic) Spartak Ivano-Frankivsk	42	18	14	10	58	53	+5	50	
5	(Ukrainian Soviet Socialist Republic) Sudnobudivnyk Mykolaiv	42	17	14	11	47	36	+11	48	
6	(Ukrainian Soviet Socialist Republic) Azovets Zhdanov	42	15	18	9	44	34	+10	48	
7	(Ukrainian Soviet Socialist Republic) Zirka Kirovohrad	42	19	9	14	48	41	+7	47	
8	(Ukrainian Soviet Socialist Republic) Bukovyna Chernivtsi	42	17	12	13	45	39	+6	46	
9	(Ukrainian Soviet Socialist Republic) Shakhtar Kadiivka	42	16	13	13	49	37	+12	45	
10	(Ukrainian Soviet Socialist Republic) Lokomotyv Kherson	42	16	12	14	60	50	+10	44	
11	(Ukrainian Soviet Socialist Republic) Desna Chernihiv	42	17	10	15	43	45	−2	44	Dissolved
12	(Ukrainian Soviet Socialist Republic) Shakhtar Horlivka	42	14	13	15	42	47	−5	41	
13	(Ukrainian Soviet Socialist Republic) Budivelnyk Poltava	42	13	13	16	33	34	−1	39	
14	(Ukrainian Soviet Socialist Republic) SKA Lviv	42	12	15	15	30	41	−11	39	
15	(Ukrainian Soviet Socialist Republic) Kryvbas Kryvyi Rih	42	12	14	16	52	48	+4	38	
16	(Byelorussian Soviet Socialist Republic) Spartak Brest	42	12	13	17	32	48	−16	37	
17	(Ukrainian Soviet Socialist Republic) Avanhard Ternopil	42	12	12	18	38	47	−9	36	
18	(Byelorussian Soviet Socialist Republic) Neman Grodno	42	11	13	18	27	48	−21	35	
19	(Russian Soviet Federative Socialist Republic) Baltika Kaliningrad	42	10	11	21	24	51	−27	31	
20	(Ukrainian Soviet Socialist Republic) SKA Odessa	42	12	6	24	34	56	−22	30	
21	(Ukrainian Soviet Socialist Republic) Spartak Sumy	42	7	14	21	31	57	−26	28	
22	(Byelorussian Soviet Socialist Republic) Gomselmash Gomel	42	7	10	25	22	55	−33	24	

(C) Champions; (P) Promoted

=== Group II [Centre and Caucasus] ===
Pos	Rep	Team	Pld	W	D	L	GF	GA	GD	Pts	Promotion
1	RUS	Shinnik Yaroslavl	42	24	14	4	66	31	+35	62	Promoted
2	RUS	Avtomobilist Nalchik	42	22	15	5	58	17	+41	59	
3	RUS	Volga Kalinin	42	22	11	9	57	31	+26	55	
4	RUS	Metallurg Tula	42	21	11	10	80	38	+42	53	
5	RUS	Mashuk Pyatigorsk	42	17	16	9	52	36	+16	50	
6	RUS	Dinamo Stavropol	42	15	16	11	37	38	−1	46	
7	RUS	Metallurg Lipetsk	42	17	10	15	51	48	+3	44	
8	RUS	Lokomotiv Kaluga	42	14	16	12	47	56	−9	44	
9	RUS	Trud Voronezh	42	16	11	15	56	43	+13	43	
10	GEO	Dinamo Batumi	42	14	15	13	35	40	−5	43	
11	RUS	Druzhba Maykop	42	15	12	15	36	34	+2	42	
12	RUS	Salyut Belgorod (Note: Spartak Belgorod changed name to Salyut.)	42	13	16	13	46	45	+1	42	
13	ARM	Shirak Leninakan	42	15	11	16	44	43	+1	41	
14	RUS	Torpedo Taganrog	42	13	15	14	36	43	−7	41	
15	RUS	Volga Gorkiy	42	12	15	15	47	46	+1	39	
16	RUS	Saturn Rybinsk	42	11	17	14	44	56	−12	39	
17	RUS	Dinamo Makhachkala	42	13	11	18	45	55	−10	37	
18	GEO	Dila Gori	42	13	11	18	43	56	−13	37	
19	RUS	Stal Volgograd (Note: Traktor Volgograd changed name to Stal.)	42	8	18	16	33	40	−7	34	
20	AZE	Dinamo Kirovabad	42	12	8	22	37	46	−9	32	
21	RUS	Dinamo Bryansk	42	7	11	24	34	79	−45	25	
22	AZE	Polad Sumgait	42	4	8	30	19	82	−63	16	

=== Group III [Siberia and Central Asia] ===
Pos	Rep	Team	Pld	W	D	L	GF	GA	GD	Pts	Promotion
1	RUS	Kuzbass Kemerovo	42	24	9	9	61	37	+24	57	Promoted
2	RUS	Spartak Yoshkar-Ola	42	24	7	11	46	30	+16	55	
3	RUS	Irtysh Omsk	42	20	14	8	63	28	+35	54	
4	RUS	TomLes Tomsk	42	17	16	9	36	28	+8	50	
5	KAZ	Vostok Ust-Kamenogorsk	42	19	11	12	51	39	+12	49	
6	RUS	SKA Chita	42	19	10	13	56	35	+21	48	
7	UZB	Politotdel Tashkent Region	42	19	10	13	48	44	+4	48	
8	RUS	Zvezda Perm	42	17	13	12	49	37	+12	47	
9	RUS	Dinamo Barnaul	42	17	11	14	60	44	+16	45	
10	RUS	Luch Vladivostok	42	16	13	13	35	33	+2	45	
11	UZB	Neftyanik Fergana	42	19	7	16	56	55	+1	45	
12	RUS	Selenga Ulan-Ude	42	15	14	13	41	39	+2	44	
13	KAZ	Metallurg Chimkent	42	15	11	16	44	46	−2	41	
14	RUS	Torpedo Togliatti (Note: Khimik Togliatti changed name to Torpedo.)	42	14	12	16	39	38	+1	40	
15	RUS	Sokol Saratov	42	16	5	21	47	51	−4	37	
16	RUS	Volga Ulyanovsk	42	12	12	18	35	50	−15	36	
17	RUS	Stroitel Ufa	42	14	7	21	36	53	−17	35	
18	RUS	Avtomobilist Krasnoyarsk (Note: Rassvet Krasnoyarsk changed name to Avtomobilist.)	42	10	14	18	29	37	−8	34	
19	RUS	Lokomotiv Chelyabinsk	42	8	16	18	40	45	−5	32	
20	RUS	Aeroflot Irkutsk	42	11	9	22	28	64	−36	31	
21	RUS	Zenit Izhevsk	42	9	10	23	35	58	−23	28	
22	UZB	Traktor Tashkent (Note: TashAvtoMash Tashkent changed name to Traktor.)	42	7	9	26	27	71	−44	23	

Source: rsssf.com
