= 1969 Soviet Top League =

32nd season of top-tier football league in Soviet Union

Soviet Top League
- Season: 1969

20 teams took part in the league with FC Spartak Moscow winning the championship.

== Round 1 ==
=== Group A ===
==== Table ====
| Pos | Team | Pld | W | D | L | GF | GA | GD | Pts | Qualification |
|---|---|---|---|---|---|---|---|---|---|---|
| 1 | (Ukrainian Soviet Socialist Republic) Dynamo Kyiv | 18 | 10 | 8 | 0 | 25 | 6 | +19 | 28 | Qualification for Places 1–14 group |
| 2 | (Russian Soviet Federative Socialist Republic) CSKA Moscow | 18 | 9 | 6 | 3 | 18 | 8 | +10 | 24 | Qualification for Places 1–14 group |
| 3 | (Russian Soviet Federative Socialist Republic) Dynamo Moscow | 18 | 7 | 4 | 7 | 17 | 18 | −1 | 18 | Qualification for Places 1–14 group |
| 4 | (Russian Soviet Federative Socialist Republic) SKA Rostov-on-Don | 18 | 7 | 4 | 7 | 20 | 24 | −4 | 18 | Qualification for Places 1–14 group |
| 5 | (Ukrainian Soviet Socialist Republic) Zarya Voroshilovgrad | 18 | 6 | 5 | 7 | 19 | 16 | +3 | 17 | Qualification for Places 1–14 group |
| 6 | (Azerbaijan Soviet Socialist Republic) Neftchi Baku | 18 | 5 | 7 | 6 | 16 | 18 | −2 | 17 | Qualification for Places 1–14 group |
| 7 | (Ukrainian Soviet Socialist Republic) Chornomorets Odessa | 18 | 5 | 7 | 6 | 14 | 17 | −3 | 17 | Qualification for Places 1–14 group |
| 8 | (Armenian Soviet Socialist Republic) Ararat Yerevan | 18 | 6 | 5 | 7 | 18 | 23 | −5 | 17 | Qualification for Places 15–20 group |
| 9 | (Russian Soviet Federative Socialist Republic) Uralmash Sverdlovsk | 18 | 4 | 6 | 8 | 9 | 18 | −9 | 14 | Qualification for Places 15–20 group |
| 10 | (Russian Soviet Federative Socialist Republic) Krylya Sovetov Kuybyshev | 18 | 3 | 4 | 11 | 16 | 24 | −8 | 10 | Qualification for Places 15–20 group |

Source: rsssf.com

==== Results ====
| Home \ Away | ARA | CHO | CSK | DYK | DYN | KRY | NEF | URA | SKA | ZAR |
|---|---|---|---|---|---|---|---|---|---|---|
| Ararat Yerevan | | 0–0 | 2–2 | 1–4 | 3–2 | 3–1 | 1–0 | 0–0 | 2–0 | 1–0 |
| Chornomorets Odessa | 2–0 | | 0–1 | 1–1 | 1–0 | 2–2 | 0–0 | 1–0 | 1–1 | 1–0 |
| CSKA Moscow | 1–0 | 2–0 | | 0–0 | 1–1 | 1–0 | 2–0 | 1–0 | 3–0 | 1–1 |
| Dynamo Kyiv | 1–1 | 1–0 | 1–0 | | 0–0 | 1–0 | 2–2 | 5–0 | 2–0 | 2–0 |
| Dynamo Moscow | 1–0 | 3–1 | 0–0 | 0–2 | | 1–0 | 2–2 | 1–0 | 1–3 | 2–0 |
| Krylya Sovetov Kuybyshev | 1–2 | 2–2 | 2–1 | 1–1 | 2–0 | | 0–0 | 0–1 | 3–0 | 1–3 |
| Neftçi Baku | 2–0 | 2–0 | 0–1 | 0–0 | 2–1 | 1–0 | | 1–0 | 0–0 | 1–1 |
| Uralmash Sverdlovsk | 1–1 | 0–1 | 0–0 | 0–0 | 0–1 | 1–0 | 3–2 | | 1–1 | 0–0 |
| SKA Rostov-on-Don | 3–1 | 1–0 | 0–1 | 0–1 | 1–0 | 2–1 | 2–1 | 3–1 | | 1–1 |
| Zarya Voroshilovgrad | 2–0 | 1–1 | 1–0 | 0–1 | 0–1 | 2–0 | 3–0 | 0–1 | 4–2 | |

Legend: Blue = home team win; Yellow = draw; Red = away team win.

=== Group B ===
==== Table ====
| Pos | Team | Pld | W | D | L | GF | GA | GD | Pts | Qualification |
|---|---|---|---|---|---|---|---|---|---|---|
| 1 | (Russian Soviet Federative Socialist Republic) Spartak Moscow | 18 | 14 | 3 | 1 | 29 | 9 | +20 | 31 | Qualification for Places 1–14 group |
| 2 | (Georgian Soviet Socialist Republic) Dinamo Tbilisi | 18 | 8 | 9 | 1 | 22 | 7 | +15 | 25 | Qualification for Places 1–14 group |
| 3 | (Ukrainian Soviet Socialist Republic) Shakhtar Donetsk | 18 | 5 | 8 | 5 | 20 | 17 | +3 | 18 | Qualification for Places 1–14 group |
| 4 | (Russian Soviet Federative Socialist Republic) Torpedo Moscow | 18 | 5 | 8 | 5 | 15 | 14 | +1 | 18 | Qualification for Places 1–14 group |
| 5 | (Byelorussian Soviet Socialist Republic) Dinamo Minsk | 18 | 5 | 6 | 7 | 16 | 19 | −3 | 16 | Qualification for Places 1–14 group |
| 6 | (Russian Soviet Federative Socialist Republic) Zenit Leningrad | 18 | 5 | 6 | 7 | 14 | 18 | −4 | 16 | Qualification for Places 1–14 group |
| 7 | (Georgian Soviet Socialist Republic) Torpedo Kutaisi | 18 | 7 | 2 | 9 | 17 | 27 | −10 | 16 | Qualification for Places 1–14 group |
| 8 | (Kazakh Soviet Socialist Republic) Kairat Alma-Ata | 18 | 4 | 7 | 7 | 15 | 18 | −3 | 15 | Qualification for Places 15–20 group |
| 9 | (Uzbek Soviet Socialist Republic) Pakhtakor Tashkent | 18 | 6 | 3 | 9 | 16 | 23 | −7 | 15 | Qualification for Places 15–20 group |
| 10 | (Russian Soviet Federative Socialist Republic) Lokomotiv Moscow | 18 | 2 | 6 | 10 | 13 | 25 | −12 | 10 | Qualification for Places 15–20 group |

Source: rsssf.com

==== Results ====
| Home \ Away | DMN | DTB | KAI | LOK | PAK | SHA | SPA | TKU | TOR | ZEN |
|---|---|---|---|---|---|---|---|---|---|---|
| Dinamo Minsk | | 0–0 | 3–0 | 1–0 | 2–2 | 1–0 | 0–1 | 1–2 | 1–1 | 2–0 |
| Dinamo Tbilisi | 2–1 | | 0–0 | 3–1 | 3–0 | 3–0 | 2–0 | 3–1 | 0–0 | 4–0 |
| Kairat Alma-Ata | 0–0 | 1–1 | | 3–0 | 0–1 | 0–0 | 1–1 | 2–0 | 3–1 | 0–1 |
| Lokomotiv Moscow | 4–1 | 0–1 | 1–1 | | 1–3 | 2–0 | 1–2 | 0–1 | 0–3 | 0–2 |
| Pakhtakor Tashkent | 0–1 | 0–0 | 1–0 | 0–0 | | 1–2 | 1–2 | 1–0 | 2–1 | 1–0 |
| Shakhtar Donetsk | 1–1 | 0–0 | 1–0 | 1–1 | 3–0 | | 1–1 | 6–0 | 2–1 | 1–1 |
| Spartak Moscow | 3–0 | 3–0 | 4–1 | 1–0 | 1–0 | 2–0 | | 2–1 | 0–0 | 2–1 |
| Torpedo Kutaisi | 1–0 | 0–0 | 2–0 | 1–1 | 3–2 | 3–2 | 0–2 | | 1–2 | 1–0 |
| Torpedo Moscow | 0–0 | 0–0 | 0–2 | 0–0 | 2–1 | 0–0 | 0–1 | 1–0 | | 2–0 |
| Zenit Leningrad | 2–1 | 0–0 | 1–1 | 1–1 | 2–0 | 0–0 | 0–1 | 2–0 | 1–1 | |

Legend: Blue = home team win; Yellow = draw; Red = away team win.

== Round 2 ==
=== Places 1–14 ===
==== Table ====
| Pos | Team | Pld | W | D | L | GF | GA | GD | Pts | Qualification |
|---|---|---|---|---|---|---|---|---|---|---|
| 1 | (Russian Soviet Federative Socialist Republic) Spartak Moscow (C) | 26 | 19 | 5 | 2 | 40 | 11 | +29 | 43 | Qualification for European Cup first round |
| 2 | (Ukrainian Soviet Socialist Republic) Dynamo Kyiv | 26 | 16 | 7 | 3 | 37 | 13 | +24 | 39 | |
| 3 | (Georgian Soviet Socialist Republic) Dinamo Tbilisi | 26 | 12 | 11 | 3 | 34 | 17 | +17 | 35 | |
| 4 | (Russian Soviet Federative Socialist Republic) Dynamo Moscow | 26 | 12 | 7 | 7 | 44 | 28 | +16 | 31 | |
| 5 | (Russian Soviet Federative Socialist Republic) Torpedo Moscow | 26 | 11 | 9 | 6 | 29 | 19 | +10 | 31 | |
| 6 | (Russian Soviet Federative Socialist Republic) CSKA Moscow | 26 | 10 | 9 | 7 | 19 | 14 | +5 | 29 | |
| 7 | (Azerbaijan Soviet Socialist Republic) Neftchi Baku | 26 | 6 | 11 | 9 | 26 | 27 | −1 | 23 | |
| 8 | (Ukrainian Soviet Socialist Republic) FC Chornomorets Odessa | 26 | 7 | 7 | 12 | 17 | 26 | −9 | 21 | |
| 9 | (Russian Soviet Federative Socialist Republic) Zenit Leningrad | 26 | 6 | 9 | 11 | 21 | 34 | −13 | 21 | |
| 10 | (Ukrainian Soviet Socialist Republic) Shakhtar Donetsk | 26 | 6 | 8 | 12 | 20 | 28 | −8 | 20 | |
| 11 | (Ukrainian Soviet Socialist Republic) Zarya Voroshilovgrad | 26 | 5 | 9 | 12 | 21 | 30 | −9 | 19 | |
| 12 | (Russian Soviet Federative Socialist Republic) SKA Rostov-on-Don | 26 | 6 | 7 | 13 | 23 | 37 | −14 | 19 | |
| 13 | (Byelorussian Soviet Socialist Republic) Dinamo Minsk | 26 | 5 | 9 | 12 | 14 | 31 | −17 | 19 | |
| 14 | (Georgian Soviet Socialist Republic) Torpedo Kutaisi | 26 | 4 | 6 | 16 | 20 | 50 | −30 | 14 | |

Source: rsssf.com
(C) Champions

==== Results ====
| Home \ Away | CHO | CSK | DYK | DMN | DYN | DTB | NEF | SHA | SKA | SPA | TKU | TOR | ZAR | ZEN |
|---|---|---|---|---|---|---|---|---|---|---|---|---|---|---|
| Chornomorets Odessa | | | | 0–1 | | 1–1 | | 2–0 | | 0–0 | 1–0 | 0–1 | | 2–0 |
| CSKA Moscow | | | | 0–0 | | 1–0 | | 2–0 | | 0–1 | 1–0 | 0–1 | | 0–1 |
| Dynamo Kyiv | | | | 3–0 | | 2–2 | | 1–0 | | 0–1 | 3–0 | 2–1 | | 4–0 |
| Dinamo Minsk | 1–2 | 0–0 | 1–2 | | 0–0 | | 0–2 | | 2–1 | | | | 1–0 | |
| Dynamo Moscow | | | | 0–0 | | 4–1 | | 3–1 | | 0–2 | 4–0 | 4–2 | | 4–1 |
| Dinamo Tbilisi | 2–0 | 0–0 | 2–0 | | 3–1 | | 1–1 | | 2–1 | | | | 2–0 | |
| Neftçi Baku | | | | 6–0 | | 1–1 | | 0–0 | | 0–0 | 3–2 | 1–2 | | 0–2 |
| Shakhtar Donetsk | 1–0 | 2–0 | 0–2 | | 1–2 | | 0–1 | | 0–0 | | | | 1–0 | |
| SKA Rostov-on-Don | | | | 2–0 | | 0–1 | | 0–1 | | 0–2 | 2–1 | 1–1 | | 1–1 |
| Spartak Moscow | 2–1 | 1–1 | 2–1 | | 2–3 | | 2–0 | | 4–0 | | | | 1–0 | |
| Torpedo Kutaisi | 0–1 | 0–0 | 0–2 | | 0–5 | | 1–1 | | 3–3 | | | | 1–1 | |
| Torpedo Moscow | 4–1 | 3–0 | 0–1 | | 1–1 | | 1–0 | | 2–1 | | | | 2–0 | |
| Zarya Voroshilovgrad | | | | 0–0 | | 0–2 | | 2–0 | | 0–2 | 2–2 | 1–0 | | 2–2 |
| Zenit Leningrad | 0–0 | 1–2 | 1–1 | | 1–2 | | 1–0 | | 2–0 | | | | 1–1 | |

Legend: Blue = home team win; Yellow = draw; Red = away team win.

==== Top scorers ====
16 goals

- Dzhemal Kherhadze (Torpedo Kutaisi)
- Nikolai Osyanin (Spartak Moscow)
- Vladimir Proskurin (SKA Rostov-on-Don)

12 goals

- Galimzyan Khusainov (Spartak Moscow)

11 goals

- Ruslan Abdullayev (Neftchi)

10 goals

- Givi Nodia (Dinamo Tbilisi)

9 goals

- Yuri Avrutskiy (Dynamo Moscow)
- Anatoli Shakun (Zorya)
- Yuri Semin (Dynamo Moscow)

8 goals

- Vitaly Khmelnitsky (Dynamo Kyiv)
- Vladimir Larin (Dynamo Moscow)
- Valeri Maslov (Dynamo Moscow)
- David Pais (Torpedo Moscow)
- Anatoliy Puzach (Dynamo Kyiv)
- Viktor Serebryannikov (Dynamo Kyiv)

=== Places 15–20 ===
==== Table ====
| Pos | Team | Pld | W | D | L | GF | GA | GD | Pts | Relegation |
|---|---|---|---|---|---|---|---|---|---|---|
| 15 | (Armenian Soviet Socialist Republic) Ararat Yerevan | 34 | 13 | 11 | 10 | 48 | 40 | +8 | 37 | |
| 16 | (Uzbek Soviet Socialist Republic) Pakhtakor Tashkent | 34 | 13 | 9 | 12 | 35 | 37 | −2 | 35 | |
| 17 | (Kazakh Soviet Socialist Republic) Kairat Alma-Ata (R) | 34 | 12 | 10 | 12 | 29 | 31 | −2 | 34 | Relegation to Class A First Group |
| 18 | (Russian Soviet Federative Socialist Republic) Lokomotiv Moscow (R) | 34 | 8 | 9 | 17 | 33 | 47 | −14 | 25 | Relegation to Class A First Group |
| 19 | (Russian Soviet Federative Socialist Republic) Krylya Sovetov Kuybyshev (R) | 34 | 8 | 8 | 18 | 34 | 48 | −14 | 24 | Relegation to Class A First Group |
| 20 | (Russian Soviet Federative Socialist Republic) Uralmash Sverdlovsk (R) | 34 | 7 | 8 | 19 | 19 | 39 | −20 | 22 | Relegation to Class A First Group |

Source: rsssf.com
(R) Relegated

==== Results ====
| Home \ Away | ARA | KAI | KRY | LOK | PAK | URA |
|---|---|---|---|---|---|---|
| Ararat Yerevan | | | 5–1 | | | 3–0 |
| Kairat Alma-Ata | | | | 0–0 | 0–1 | |
| Krylya Sovetov Kuybyshev | 1–1 | | | | | 2–2 |
| Lokomotiv Moscow | | 1–1 | | | 1–0 | |
| Pakhtakor Tashkent | | 0–1 | | 3–1 | | |
| Uralmash Sverdlovsk | 2–0 | | 0–1 | | | |

Legend: Blue = home team win; Yellow = draw; Red = away team win.

==== Top scorers ====
14 goals

- Oganes Zanazanyan (Ararat)

13 goals

- Boris Kazakov (Krylia Sovetov)

9 goals

- Nikolai Kazaryan (Ararat)

8 goals

- Rudolf Atamalyan (Lokomotiv Moscow)
- Vyacheslav Bektashev (Pakhtakor)
- Gennadi Krasnitsky (Pakhtakor)
