= 1970 Soviet Cup =

1970 Cup of USSR in Football
Кубок СССР

Tournament details
- Country: Soviet Union
- Dates: March 31 – August 8
- Teams: 32 (final stage); 105 (total)

Final positions
- Champions: Dinamo Moscow
- Runners-up: Dinamo Tbilisi

The 1970 Soviet Cup was an association football cup competition of the Soviet Union. The winner of the competition, Dinamo Moscow qualified for the continental tournament.

== Participating teams ==
Enter in Final round	Enter in First round	Enter in Qualification round		
Top Grouppa 17/17 teams	First Grouppa 22/22 teams	Second Grouppa 66/66 teams		
✓ CSKA Moscow; ✓ Dinamo Moscow; ✓ Spartak Moscow; ✓ Dinamo Tbilisi; ✓ Zaria Voroshilovgrad; ✓ Torpedo Moscow; ✓ Dinamo Kiev; ✓ SKA Rostov-na-Donu; ✓ Dinamo Minsk; ✓ Shakhter Donetsk; ✓ Neftchi Baku; ✓ Ararat Yerevan; ✓ Pakhtakor Tashkent; ✓ Zenit Leningrad; ✓ Chernomorets Odessa; ✓ Torpedo Kutaisi; ✓ Spartak Ordzhonikidze	✓ Karpaty Lvov; ✓ Kairat Alma-Ata; ✓ Dnepr Dnepropetrovsk; ✓ Lokomotiv Moscow; ✓ Metallist Kharkov; ✓ Dinamo Leningrad; ✓ Krylya Sovetov Kuibyshev; ✓ Rubin Kazan; ✓ Shakhter Karaganda; ✓ Zhalgiris Vilnius; ✓ Moldova Kishinev; ✓ Tekstilschik Ivanovo; ✓ Volgar Astrakhan; ✓ Uralmash Sverdlovsk; ✓ Lokomotiv Tbilisi; ✓ Kuban Krasnodar; ✓ Daugava Riga; ✓ Pamir Dushanbe; ✓ SKA Kiev; ✓ Alga Frunze; ✓ SKA Khabarovsk; ✓ Stroitel Ashkhabad	✓ Metallurg Zaporozhye; ✓ Tavriya Simferopol; ✓ Avtomobilist Zhitomir; ✓ Spartak Ivano-Frankovsk; ✓ Sudostoitel Nikolayev; ✓ Azovets Zhdanov; ✓ Zvezda Kirovograd; ✓ Bukovina Chernovtsy; ✓ Shakhter Kadiyevka; ✓ Lokomotiv Kherson; ✓ Desna Chernigov; ✓ Shakhter Gorlovka; ✓ Stroitel Poltava; ✓ SKA Lvov; ✓ Krivbass Krivoi Rog; ✓ Spartak Brest; ✓ Avangard Ternopol; ✓ Neman Grodno; ✓ Baltika Kaliningrad; ✓ SKA Odessa; ✓ Spartak Sumy; ✓ Gomselmash Gomel	✓ Shinnik Yaroslavl; ✓ Avtomobilist Nalchik; ✓ Volga Kalinin; ✓ Metallurg Tula; ✓ Mashuk Pyatigorsk; ✓ Dinamo Stavropol; ✓ Metallurg Lipetsk; ✓ Lokomotiv Kaluga; ✓ Trud Voronezh; ✓ Dinamo Batumi; ✓ Druzhba Maykop; ✓ Salyut Belgorod; ✓ Shirak Leninakan; ✓ Torpedo Taganrog; ✓ Volga Gorkiy; ✓ Saturn Rybinsk; ✓ Dinamo Makhachkala; ✓ Dila Gori; ✓ Stal Volgograd; ✓ Dinamo Kirovabad; ✓ Dinamo Briansk; ✓ Polad Sumgait	✓ Kuzbass Kemerovo; ✓ Spartak Yoshkar-Ola; ✓ Irtysh Omsk; ✓ Tomles Tomsk; ✓ Vostok Ust-Kamenogorsk; ✓ SKA Chita; ✓ Politodel Tashkent Oblast; ✓ Zvezda Perm; ✓ Dinamo Barnaul; ✓ Luch Vladivostok; ✓ Neftianik Fergana; ✓ Selenga Ulan-Ude; ✓ Metallurg Chimkent; ✓ Torpedo Tolyatti; ✓ Sokol Saratov; ✓ Volga Ulyanovsk; ✓ Stroitel Ufa; ✓ Avtomobilist Krasnoyarsk; ✓ Lokomotiv Chelyabinsk; ✓ Aeroflot Irkutsk; ✓ Zenit Izhevsk; ✓ Traktor Tashkent

== Competition schedule ==
=== First round ===
[Apr 5] 
Avtomobilist Nalchik         0-0  Lokomotiv Kaluga 
AVTOMOBILIST Zhitomir        4-0  Shakhtyor Gorlovka 
  [R.Zhuravskiy 8, 25, Y.Nesmeyan 43, V.Sladkovskiy ?] 
BUKOVINA Chernovtsy          3-2  Neman Grodno 
  [Pavlenko 5, 75, Polyakov 52 – V.Yaromko 40, 89] 
Dinamo Batumi                1-1  Dinamo Kirovabad 
Dinamo Makhachkala           0-1  VOLGA Gorkiy             [aet] 
Dinamo Stavropol             0-1  TRUD Voronezh            [aet] 
LOKOMOTIV Kherson            1-0  Spartak Sumy 
MASHUK Pyatigorsk            2-1  Shinnik Yaroslavl 
  [? – V.Frolov] 
METALLURG Lipetsk            2-0  Dinamo Bryansk 
METALLURG Tula               2-1  Stal Volgograd           [aet] 
METALLURG Zaporozhye         1-0  Stroitel Poltava 
  [Kutin] 
Polad Sumgait                0-1  VOLGA Kalinin 
SATURN Rybinsk               1-0  Salyut Belgorod 
SKA Lvov                     0-1  SPARTAK Brest 
  [V.Kuchinskiy 34] 
SKA Odessa                   2-1  GomSelMash Gomel 
  [S.Vovk 37, V.Zhmurko 85 – K.Shimanskiy ?] 
SPARTAK Ivano-Frankovsk      2-1  Shakhtyor Kadiyevka 
SUDOSTROITEL Nikolayev       6-1  Baltika Kaliningrad 
   [Petrov 50, 89, Yegorovich 54, Kimalov 65, 75, Derevyaga 70 – Y.Solovyov 86] 
TAVRIA Simferopol            2-0  Desna Chernigov 
TORPEDO Taganrog             2-0  Dila Gori 
Zvezda Kirovograd            0-1  KRIVBASS Krivoi Rog 
  [V.Mironov] 
[Apr 12] 
Irtysh Omsk                  1-1  Luch Vladivostok 
  [S.Gorokhovadatskiy pen – S.Bondarchuk] 
[Apr 14] 
AVTOMOBILIST Krasnoyarsk     3-0  Aeroflot Irkutsk 
  [Kayurov 42, 53, 69] 
Lokomotiv Chelyabinsk        0-0  Selenga Ulan-Ude 
NEFTYANIK Fergana            2-0  Stroitel Ufa 
SOKOL Saratov                w/o  Metallurg Chimkent 
SPARTAK Yoshkar-Ola          2-0  SKA Chita 
TOMLES Tomsk                 2-0  Dinamo Barnaul 
  [Y.Khanin, S.Sobolev] 
TORPEDO Togliatti            w/o  Politotdel Tashkent Region 
VOLGA Ulyanovsk              w/o  Zenit Izhevsk 
ZVEZDA Perm                  1-0  Kuzbass Kemerovo

==== First round replays ====
[Apr 6] 
AVTOMOBILIST Nalchik         2-0  Lokomotiv Kaluga 
DINAMO Batumi                2-0  Dinamo Kirovabad 
[Apr 13] 
Irtysh Omsk                  0-0  Luch Vladivostok 
[Apr 15] 
LOKOMOTIV Chelyabinsk        3-2  Selenga Ulan-Ude         [aet] 
  [? – A.Astafyev, Y.Samsonov] 
[Apr 15] 
Irtysh Omsk                  0-1  LUCH Vladivostok 
  [V.Alyokhin]

=== Second round ===
[Apr 5] 
Dnepr Dnepropetrovsk         0-1  LOKOMOTIV Moskva         [aet] 
  [Anatoliy Napreyev 93] 
KUBAN Krasnodar              1-0  Rubin Kazan 
LOKOMOTIV Tbilisi            1-0  Daugava Riga 
Pamir Dushanbe               2-2  SKA Kiev 
  [Gennadiy Smirnov, Nail Hasyanov - ?] 
SHAKHTYOR Karaganda          1-0  Alga Frunze 
  [Yevgeniy Piunovskiy] 
SKA Khabarovsk               1-2  KRYLYA SOVETOV Kuibyshev 
  [S.Shorkin - ?] 
Stroitel Ashkhabad           1-1  Dinamo Leningrad 
URALMASH Sverdlovsk          w/o  Moldova Kishinev 
ŽALGIRIS Vilnius             1-0  Karpaty Lvov 
[Apr 16] 
METALLIST Kharkov            2-1  Textilshchik Ivanovo 
  [Nikolai Konovalov 50, Ivan Matviyenko (T) 63 og – Ivan Matviyenko 76] 
[Apr 19] 
NEFTYANIK Fergana            3-0  Lokomotiv Chelyabinsk 
SOKOL Saratov                w/o  Traktor Tashkent 
TORPEDO Togliatti            3-0  TomLes Tomsk 
Volga Ulyanovsk              0-1  SPARTAK Yoshkar-Ola 
Vostok Ust-Kamenogorsk       0-1  LUCH Vladivostok 
  [V.Bulgarov] 
ZVEZDA Perm                  3-0  Avtomobilist Krasnoyarsk 
[Apr 23] 
AVANGARD Ternopol            3-1  Azovets Zhdanov 
Avtomobilist Nalchik         2-3  METALLURG Lipetsk        [aet] 
BUKOVINA Chernovtsy          1-0  Spartak Ivano-Frankovsk 
DINAMO Batumi                3-0  Saturn Rybinsk 
Druzhba Maykop               0-1  VOLGA Kalinin 
Krivbass Krivoi Rog          1-1  Metallurg Zaporozhye 
  [V.Mironov - ?] 
LOKOMOTIV Kherson            1-0  SKA Odessa               [aet] 
  [A.Lebed 105] 
MASHUK Pyatigorsk            2-1  Volga Gorkiy 
Shirak Leninakan             2-3  METALLURG Tula           [aet] 
Spartak Brest                2-4  AVTOMOBILIST Zhitomir    [aet] 
  [V.Stuk 25, 65 – Y.Nesmeyan 15, N.Vasyutin 90, A.Gorelov 100, V.Chirva 118] 
TAVRIA Simferopol            3-2  Sudostroitel Nikolayev 
  [Bystrov 26 pen, Klimov 37, Prilepskiy 87 – Petrov 73, Satayev 85] 
Torpedo Taganrog             1-1  Trud Voronezh

==== Second round replays ====
[Apr 6] 
PAMIR Dushanbe               1-0  SKA Kiev 
  [Georgiy Martyan] 
STROITEL Ashkhabad           1-0  Dinamo Leningrad         [aet] 
[Apr 24] 
KRIVBASS Krivoi Rog          1-0  Metallurg Zaporozhye 
  [O.Chumak] 
Torpedo Taganrog             0-1  TRUD Voronezh

=== Third round ===
[Apr 23] 
Luch Vladivostok             0-0  Zvezda Perm 
Sokol Saratov                1-1  Neftyanik Fergana 
  [Pashovkin - ?] 
SPARTAK Yoshkar-Ola          2-0  Torpedo Togliatti 
[Apr 24] 
Kuban Krasnodar              0-1  ŽALGIRIS Vilnius 
Lokomotiv Moskva             0-0  Krylya Sovetov Kuibyshev 
METALLURG Lipetsk            1-0  Mashuk Pyatigorsk 
METALLURG Tula               2-0  Dinamo Batumi 
Stroitel Ashkhabad           1-2  KAYRAT Alma-Ata 
UralMash Sverdlovsk          1-2  PAMIR Dushanbe 
  [Nikolai Vishnyakov – Tolib Nabiyev, Yevgeniy Anishchenko] 
Volga Kalinin                0-0  Trud Voronezh 
Volgar Astrakhan             0-1  LOKOMOTIV Tbilisi 
[Apr 26] 
METALLIST Kharkov            1-0  Shakhtyor Karaganda      [aet] 
  [Alexandr Kafaji 98] 
[Apr 28] 
AVANGARD Ternopol            1-0  Krivbass Krivoi Rog 
AVTOMOBILIST Zhitomir        2-1  Bukovina Chernovtsy 
TAVRIA Simferopol            1-0  Lokomotiv Kherson

==== Third round replays ====
[Apr 24] 
LUCH Vladivostok             3-0  Zvezda Perm 
  [V.Starukhin, Y.Sinitsyn, V.Lukyanov] 
Sokol Saratov                0-1  NEFTYANIK Fergana 
[Apr 25] 
LOKOMOTIV Moskva             3-1  Krylya Sovetov Kuibyshev [aet] 
  [Dmitriy Dimitriadi 23, Yuriy Karnakhin ot, Rudolf Atamalyan ot – Alexandr Voronin 39] 
Volga Kalinin                0-2  TRUD Voronezh 
  [Borisov-2]

=== Fourth round ===
[May 9, 12] 
Metallist Kharkov          0-0  0-1  TORPEDO Moskva 
  [1. Att: 30,000] 
  [2. Leonid Pakhomov 34. Att: 15,000] 
[May 9, 13] 
CHERNOMORETS Odessa        2-2  1-1  Metallurg Lipetsk 
  [1. Vasiliy Moskalenko 45, Viktor Lysenko 48 pen – Anatoliy Kurbatov 23, Anatoliy Prosikov 36] 
  [2. Alexandr Shimanovich ? – Vladimir Baburin 15. Att: 17,000] 
Note: Chernomorets proceeded to the next round, as the club delegated 
      a player (Valeriy Porkuyan) to the national team. 
DINAMO Minsk               1-0  0-0  Spartak Yoshkar-Ola 
  [1. Anatoliy Vasilyev 28] 
  [2. Att: 15,000] 
DINAMO Tbilisi             1-0  4-2  Lokomotiv Tbilisi 
  [1. Levan Nodia. Att: 15,000] 
  [2. Guram Petriashvili-2, Georgiy Gavasheli-2 – Badri Jorbenadze, Yelguja Khutsishvili. Att: 6,000] 
Kayrat Alma-Ata            0-0  1-2  NEFTCHI Baku 
  [2. Yuriy Sevidov pen - Anatoliy Banishevskiy, Valeriy Gajiyev] 
Lokomotiv Moskva           1-2  0-3  TORPEDO Kutaisi 
  [1. Nikolai Goncharov – Demuri Vekua, Jemal Kherkhadze. Att: 5,000] 
  [2. Jemal Kherkhadze-2, Demuri Vekua. Att: 14,000] 
Luch Vladivostok           0-2  1-1  ZENIT Leningrad 
  [1. Vladimir Polyakov 27, Boris Kokh 30. Att: 27,000] 
  [2. Y.Sinitsyn 2 - Boris Kokh 6. Att: 18,000] 
Metallurg Tula             0-0  1-3  PAHTAKOR Tashkent 
  [2. Alexandr Kuznetsov 64 – Bohadyr Ibragimov 41, 53, Tulyagan Isakov 73] 
Neftyanik Fergana          0-3  0-3  CSKA Moskva 
  [1. Boris Kopeikin-2, Anatoliy Maslyayev] 
  [2. Boris Kopeikin-2, Yuriy Istomin] 
Pamir Dushanbe             3-2  1-3  ARARAT Yerevan 
  [1. Leonid Kirilenko 47, Tolib Nabiyev 55, Yuriy Pekshev 80 – Levon Ishtoyan 46, Oganes Zanazanyan 88] 
  [2. Furman Abramyan (A) og - Aram Kazanchan-2, Oganes Zanazanyan] 
SKA Rostov-na-Donu         1-0  0-2  AVANGARD Ternopol 
  [1. Alexandr Mironov 82] 
  [2. V.Sekech 65, Vladimir Shchegolkov 69]
Spartak Orjonikidze        1-2  0-1  ZARYA Voroshilovgrad 
  [1. Igor Dzagoyev 88 – Gennadiy Shilin 48, Yuriy Yeliseyev 83. Att: 15,000] 
  [2. Vyacheslav Semyonov 7. Att: 15,000] 
Tavria Simferopol          1-2  0-3  DINAMO Kiev 
  [1. Andrei Cheremisin 14 – Vladimir Onishchenko 1, Vladimir Troshkin 18] 
  [2. Anatoliy Bogovik 56, 69, Klimov 70. Att: 25,000] 
ŽALGIRIS Vilnius           1-1  1-0  Shakhtyor Donetsk 
  [1. Vitautas Lideka 36 – Eduard Kozinkevich 65] 
  [2. Kazimiras Žitkus 37] 
[May 10, 14] 
DINAMO Moskva              0-0  1-0  Avtomobilist Zhitomir 
  [1. Att: 15,000] 
  [2. Yuriy Avrutskiy 58. Att: 25,000] 
Trud Voronezh              1-1  1-3  SPARTAK Moskva 
  [1. Viktor Shamarin 36 – Galimzyan Husainov 85. Att: 18,000] 
  [2. Vladimir Yanishevskiy – Nikolai Osyanin, Vasiliy Kalinov, Galimzyan Huasinov. Att: 35,000]

=== Fifth round ===
[May 28, Jun 1] 
Avangard Ternopol          0-0  0-4  CHERNOMORETS Odessa 
  [2. Vasiliy Moskalenko 14, Sergei Zvenigorodskiy 20, Vasiliy Bosy 79, Ishtvan Sekech 82] 
CSKA Moskva                2-3  2-4  ZENIT Leningrad 
  [1. Valentin Utkin 15, Boris Kopeikin 38 – Boris Kokh 12, Vladimir Goncharov 31, Gennadiy Unanov 61. Att: 15,000] 
  [2. Vladimir Zhigunov 10, Boris Kopeikin 86 – Lev Burchalkin 18, Boris Kokh 21, Pavel Sadyrin 39, Maryan Plakhetko (C) 58 og. Att: 25,000] 
DINAMO Kiev                3-0  0-1  Zarya Voroshilovgrad 
  [1. Anatoliy Bogovik 6, Vladimir Troshkin 58, Viktor Kashchei 87 pen. Att: 48,000] 
  [2. Vyacheslav Semyonov 43. Att: 10,000] 
Dinamo Minsk               0-1  0-0  TORPEDO Moskva 
  [1. Gennadiy Shalimov 85. Att: 32,000] 
  [2. Att: 3,000] 
DINAMO Moskva              1-0  0-0  Ararat Yerevan 
  [1. Yuriy Syomin 87. Att: 15,000] 
  [2. Att: 15,000] 
NEFTCHI Baku               4-0  2-4  Pahtakor Tashkent 
  [1. Yuriy Stekolnikov 15, 35, Nikolai Smolnikov 25, Eduard Markarov ?] 
  [2. Rafik Ali-Zade 20, Eduard Markarov ? – Tulyagan Isakov 14, Sergei Dotsenko 30, Viktor Varyukhin ?, Viktor Tsybin ?] 
Torpedo Kutaisi            1-1  0-0  DINAMO Tbilisi 
  [1. Shota Okropirashvili – Alexei Iliadi. Att: 18,000] 
  [2. Att: 3,000] 
Žalgiris Vilnius           1-3  1-0  SPARTAK Moskva 
  [1. Algirdas Žilinskas 32 – Galimzyan Husainov 43, Vasiliy Kalinov 81, Nikolai Osyanin 84. Att: 22,000] 
  [2. Leonardas Žukauskas 84. Att: 15,000]

=== Quarterfinals ===
[Jun 27] 
Chernomorets Odessa     1-2  DINAMO Tbilisi 
  [Vasiliy Moskalenko 56 – Sergei Kutivadze 21, Murtaz Khurtsilava 85. Att: 25,000] 
DINAMO Kiev             2-1  Zenit Leningrad 
  [Anatoliy Byshovets 35, Ferents Medvid 85 – Boris Yumakulov 24. Att: 20,000] 
DINAMO Moskva           3-0  Torpedo Moskva 
  [Yuriy Syomin 64, Yuriy Avrutskiy 74, 80. Att: 35,000] 
NEFTCHI Baku            1-0  Spartak Moskva 
  [Anatoliy Banishevskiy 10. Att: 25,000]

=== Semifinals ===
[Jul 25] 
DINAMO Moskva           2-1  Dinamo Kiev 
  [Yuriy Avrutskiy 13, Vladimir Eshtrekov 54 – Anatoliy Puzach 22. Att: 54,000] 
DINAMO Tbilisi          1-0  Neftchi Baku 
  [Rafik Kuliyev (N) og. Att: 30,000]

==== Final ====
8 August 1970

Dinamo Moscow	2 – 1	Dinamo Tbilisi
Eshtrekov 17'; Yevryuzhikhin 62'	Report	Khinchagashvili 66'

Lenin's Central Stadium, Moscow
Attendance: 103,000
Referee: Vladimir Tolchinsky (Alma-Ata)
