= Trud (Russian newspaper) =

Russian newspaper

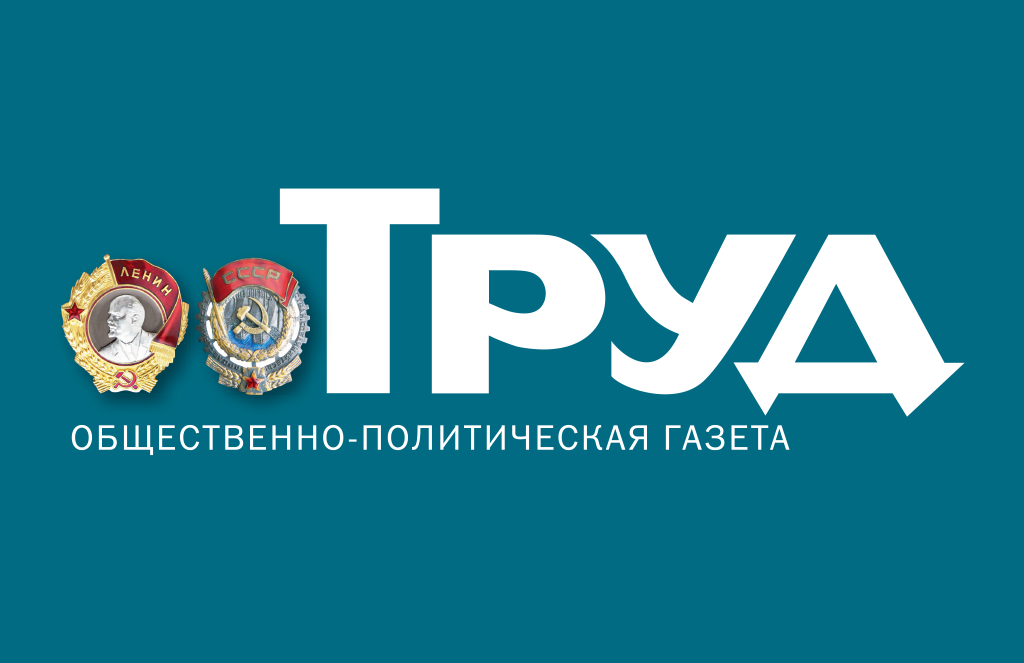

- Front page on December 29, 2010
- Type: Daily newspaper
- Format: Tabloid
- Owner: Newspaper "Trud" LLC
- Editor-in-chief: Valery Simonov
- Associate editor: Yuri Ryazhskiy, Vasily Schurov
- Founded: February 19, 1921
- Language: Russian
- Headquarters: 9 Dmitrovka Street, Moscow, Russia
- Circulation: 222,000
- Website: trud.ru (in Russian)

Trud (Russian: Труд, English: Labor) is a Russian newspaper.

Trud's first issue was on February 19, 1921, in Moscow, in what would soon become the Soviet Union. Under the Soviet state, the paper published the work of famous writers and poets, including Vladimir Mayakovsky, Nikolai Rubtsov, Yuri Nagibin, and Yevgeny Yevtushenko. Prior to the dissolution of the Soviet Union, Trud was the press organ of the All-Union Central Council of Trade Unions. It emphasized labor and economic analyses and included official decrees and orders. In 1990 the paper's circulation reached 21.5 million, the world's largest according to the Guinness Book of Records.

In the years following the end of the Soviet Union, about 21 million of these readers were lost and the paper fell into decline. In 2007, the media asset management group PromSvyazCapital created the holding company Media3. Media3's holdings included Trud, other newspapers including Argumenty i Fakty, and other assets.

In February 2008, the daily newspaper was completely re-branded, the format changed from broadsheet to full-color tabloid, and the only nationwide job classifieds section included. In 2009 the paper's website saw a major updating.

On May 1, 2011, after a number of editorial changes, Media3 terminated its contract with the publishing house JSC (Labor Publishing House) for JSC to produce content for Trud (including the Sunday edition and the online version). The announced reason was to cut costs and improve the profitability of all the businesses held by the media company Media3. Content for Trud was to be purchased from editorial units of the holding company, particularly Argumenty i Fakty. Media3 also contemplated the sale of some publishing projects operating under the Trud brand.

In January 2012, Trud was purchased from Media3 by Newspaper "Labor" LLC and returned to its historic building at 9 Grand Dmitrovka Street. In February 2012 was announced that the new owners of Trud would be the Institute of Free Journalism, founded by Sergei Choi (Deputy Chairman of RusHydro and an associate of United Russia co-chairman Yury Luzhkov) and the journalists Valery Simonov and Yuri Ryazhskiy. As of 2013, Trud is published three times a week.

== See also ==
- Eastern Bloc information dissemination
