= 1970 Soviet Class B =

Soviet football league season

== Ukraine ==
=== Ranking 1-14th ===
Pos	Team	Pld	W	D	L	GF	GA	GD	Pts	Promotion
1	FC Khimik Severodonetsk (C, P)	40	23	15	2	66	20	+46	61	Promoted
2	FC Lokomotyv Vinnytsia (P)	40	22	15	3	60	17	+43	59	Promoted
3	FC Lokomotyv Donetsk (P)	40	23	9	8	66	30	+36	55	Promoted
4	FC Dynamo Khmelnytskyi (P)	40	19	13	8	49	24	+25	51	Promoted
5	FC Karpaty Mukacheve	40	19	13	8	51	36	+15	51	
6	FC Avanhard Antratsyt	40	16	14	10	30	33	−3	46	
7	FC Verkhovyna Uzhhorod (P)	40	19	7	14	36	29	+7	45	Promoted
8	FC Torpedo Lutsk (P)	40	15	14	11	35	32	+3	44	Promoted
9	FC Horyn Rovno (P)	40	14	14	12	48	41	+7	42	Promoted
10	FC Shakhtar Sverdlovsk	40	13	13	14	35	34	+1	39	
11	FC Avanhard Makiivka	40	12	13	15	33	41	−8	37	
12	FC Avanhard Kramatorsk	40	13	11	16	43	54	−11	37	
13	FC Komunarets Komunarsk	40	13	10	17	38	42	−4	36	
14	FC Avanhard Rovenky	40	11	10	19	35	57	−22	32	

(C) Champions; (P) Promoted

=== Ranking 15-27th ===
Pos	Team	Pld	W	D	L	GF	GA	GD	Pts	Promotion
15	FC Dnipro Cherkasy (P)	40	15	14	11	49	42	+7	44	Promoted
16	FC Avanhard Zhovti Vody	40	15	12	13	34	26	+8	42	
17	FC Shakhtar Chervonohrad	40	15	11	14	35	33	+2	41	
18	FC Enerhiya Nova Kakhovka	40	16	9	15	43	43	0	41	
19	FC Shakhtar Kirovsk	40	15	11	14	34	47	−13	41	
20	FC Naftovyk Drohobych	40	15	8	17	40	51	−11	38	
21	FC Trubnyk Nikopol	40	11	15	14	26	32	−6	37	
22	FC Torpedo Berdyansk	40	13	11	16	28	41	−13	37	
23	SKCF Sevastopol	40	13	9	18	33	43	−10	35	
24	FC Shakhtar Oleksandriya	40	11	12	17	33	46	−13	34	
25	FC Shakhtar Krasnyi Luch	40	9	13	18	19	52	−33	31	
26	FC Podillya Kamianets-Podilskyi	40	10	10	20	29	48	−19	30	
27	FC Shakhtar Torez	40	7	12	21	16	44	−28	26	

(P) Promoted

== See also ==
- Soviet Second League B
