= 1971 Soviet Second League =

Second League
- Season: 1971

1971 Soviet Second League was a Soviet competition in the Soviet Second League.

== Qualifying groups ==
=== Group I [Ukraine] ===
Pos	Team	Pld	W	D	L	GF	GA	GD	Pts	Qualification or relegation
1	Kryvbas Kryvyi Rih (C, Q)	50	31	10	9	78	32	+46	72	Promotion qualification (Note: Kryvbas qualified for the play off with the third team that placed third in final tournament. After winning the play off, Kryvbas was promoted.)
2	Sudnobudivnyk Mykolaiv	50	30	11	9	69	31	+38	71	
3	Avtomobilist Zhytomyr	50	25	15	10	58	30	+28	65	
4	Shakhtar Kadiivka	50	24	15	11	67	34	+33	63	
5	Tavriya Simferopol	50	24	11	15	79	50	+29	59	
6	Zirka Kirovohrad	50	21	17	12	52	33	+19	59	
7	Lokomotyv Vinnytsia	50	17	22	11	47	35	+12	56	
8	Budivelnyk Poltava	50	21	13	16	54	43	+11	55	
9	Shakhtar Horlivka	50	17	20	13	50	50	0	54	
10	Khimik Severodonetsk	50	19	15	16	66	61	+5	53	
11	Metalurh Zhdanov	50	18	15	17	62	55	+7	51	
12	SKA Odessa	50	18	15	17	50	48	+2	51	
13	Lokomotyv Kherson	50	18	14	18	46	53	−7	50	
14	Avanhard Ternopil	50	18	13	19	43	46	−3	49	
15	Frunzenets Sumy	50	15	18	17	42	43	−1	48	
16	Bukovyna Chernivtsi	50	17	14	19	35	38	−3	48	
17	SKA Kiev	50	15	17	18	43	44	−1	47	
18	Dynamo Khmelnytskyi	50	15	16	19	35	45	−10	46	
19	Spartak Ivano-Frankivsk	50	18	9	23	46	46	0	45	
20	Hoverla Uzhhorod	50	15	15	20	42	55	−13	45	
21	Avanhard Sevastopol	50	14	17	19	37	54	−17	45	
22	Lokomotyv Donetsk	50	12	16	22	40	62	−22	40	
23	SKA Lviv	50	10	17	23	33	55	−22	37	Reformed (Note: According to the season's regulations two bottom teams had to be relegated including Torpedo Lutsk and Horyn Rovno, but the Football Federation of Ukrainian SSR, considering the loss of professional team in two adjacent oblasts in western Ukraine, adopted a decision to leave teams of both cities in the Second League. However, in 1972 on a basis of the Lutsk city team, there was formed professional team of the Carpathian Military District and created SC Lutsk. At the same time, the original professional team of the Carpathian Military District SKA Lviv was merged with the newly formed SC Lutsk. Moreover, other two army sports clubs of Ukrainian competitions, SKA Kiev and SKA Odessa, moved next year to another cities.)
24	Dnipro Cherkasy	50	9	15	26	28	69	−41	33	Relegated
25	Torpedo Lutsk	50	7	16	27	21	66	−45	30	Reformed
26	Horyn Rovno	50	9	10	31	27	72	−45	28	

(C) Champions; (Q) Qualified for the phase indicated

=== Group II [Centre and Northwest] ===
[3-1-0 point system]

Pos	Rep	Team	Pld	W	D	L	GF	GA	GD	Pts
1	RUS	Iskra Smolensk	38	23	13	2	57	15	+42	82
2	RUS	Metallurg Tula	38	23	8	7	58	28	+30	77
3	RUS	Salyut Belgorod	38	18	14	6	46	27	+19	68
4	RUS	Volga Kalinin	38	17	15	6	35	20	+15	66
5	RUS	Baltika Kaliningrad	38	17	11	10	47	30	+17	62
6	BLR	GomSelMash Gomel	38	16	13	9	47	28	+19	61
7	RUS	Lokomotiv Kaluga	38	16	10	12	45	41	+4	58
8	RUS	Spartak Petrozavodsk (Note: Onezhets Petrozavodsk changed name to Spartak.)	38	13	16	9	42	38	+4	55
9	BLR	Spartak Brest	38	13	16	9	33	29	+4	55
10	RUS	Spartak Oryol	38	12	13	13	36	34	+2	49
11	RUS	Mashinostroitel Pskov (Note: Electron Pskov changed name to Mashinostroitel.)	38	13	7	18	34	42	−8	46
12	BLR	Neman Grodno	38	11	12	15	28	36	−8	45
13	RUS	Dinamo Bryansk	38	9	16	13	30	36	−6	43
14	BLR	Spartak Mogilyov	38	9	16	13	30	40	−10	43
15	LTU	Atlantas Klaipeda	38	9	13	16	23	34	−11	40
16	BLR	Dvina Vitebsk	38	7	14	17	21	42	−21	35
17	RUS	Sever Murmansk	38	8	11	19	21	43	−22	35
18	RUS	Trudoviye Rezervy Kursk	38	5	16	17	24	40	−16	31
19	LVA	Zvejnieks Liepaja	38	7	10	21	20	48	−28	31
20	RUS	Electron Novgorod	38	5	14	19	32	59	−27	29

=== Group III [Volga and Greater Caucasus] ===
Pos	Rep	Team	Pld	W	D	L	GF	GA	GD	Pts
1	RUS	Avtomobilist Nalchik	38	23	9	6	58	24	+34	55
2	RUS	Druzhba Maykop	38	18	12	8	44	20	+24	48
3	RUS	Volga Gorkiy	38	19	8	11	52	31	+21	46
4	RUS	Mashuk Pyatigorsk	38	17	10	11	47	30	+17	44
5	RUS	Kuban Krasnodar	38	17	9	12	45	31	+14	43
6	RUS	Kord Balakovo	38	14	15	9	38	27	+11	43
7	RUS	Terek Grozny	38	16	10	12	37	30	+7	42
8	RUS	Volga Ulyanovsk	38	17	6	15	39	38	+1	40
9	RUS	Dinamo Makhachkala	38	14	11	13	38	41	−3	39
10	ARM	Shirak Leninakan	38	15	9	14	45	50	−5	39
11	RUS	Dinamo Stavropol	38	13	12	13	38	36	+2	38
12	ARM	Lori Kirovakan	38	14	8	16	32	37	−5	36
13	RUS	Stal Volgograd	38	12	11	15	31	38	−7	35
14	RUS	Khimik Dzerzhinsk	38	14	6	18	31	43	−12	34
15	RUS	Uralan Elista	38	12	9	17	40	51	−11	33
16	RUS	Torpedo Togliatti	38	10	12	16	25	40	−15	32
17	RUS	Energiya Cheboksary	38	9	13	16	30	51	−21	31
18	RUS	Sokol Saratov	38	10	9	19	33	50	−17	29
19	RUS	Spartak Yoshkar-Ola	38	8	12	18	33	43	−10	28
20	RUS	Torpedo Taganrog	38	6	13	19	25	50	−25	25

=== Group IV [Russia and Georgia] ===
Pos	Rep	Team	Pld	W	D	L	GF	GA	GD	Pts
1	RUS	Metallurg Lipetsk	38	22	11	5	64	21	+43	55
2	GEO	Metallurg Rustavi	38	19	13	6	54	25	+29	51
3	RUS	Spartak Kostroma	38	14	15	9	47	32	+15	43
4	GEO	Dinamo Batumi	38	12	19	7	35	28	+7	43
5	RUS	Trud Voronezh	38	15	10	13	59	41	+18	40
6	GEO	Mertskhali Makharadze	38	12	16	10	32	39	−7	40
7	GEO	Dila Gori	38	12	15	11	50	52	−2	39
8	RUS	Spartak Ryazan	38	13	12	13	35	35	0	38
9	RUS	Motor Vladimir	38	12	14	12	39	44	−5	38
10	RUS	Khimmashevets Penza	38	13	11	14	37	34	+3	37
11	GEO	Kolkhida Poti	38	12	13	13	34	38	−4	37
12	RUS	Saturn Rybinsk	38	14	9	15	39	48	−9	37
13	GEO	Dinamo Sukhumi	38	12	12	14	50	50	0	36
14	RUS	Mashinostroitel Podolsk (Note: Mashinostroitel Balashikha relocated to Podolsk.)	38	13	10	15	36	40	−4	36
15	GEO	Meshakhte Tkibuli	38	13	9	16	47	57	−10	35
16	RUS	Dinamo Kirov	38	12	10	16	35	38	−3	34
17	RUS	Spartak Saransk	38	11	11	16	29	40	−11	33
18	RUS	Dinamo Vologda	38	10	13	15	26	49	−23	33
19	RUS	Khimik Novomoskovsk	38	9	12	17	27	48	−21	30
20	RUS	Spartak Tambov	38	7	11	20	24	40	−16	25

=== Group V [Ural and Central Asia] ===
Pos	Rep	Team	Pld	W	D	L	GF	GA	GD	Pts
1	RUS	Zvezda Perm	34	23	8	3	61	24	+37	54
2	KAZ	Alatau Jambul (Note: Energetik Jambul changed name to Alatau.)	34	19	8	7	43	32	+11	46
3	UZB	Yangiyer	34	19	5	10	39	24	+15	43
4	RUS	Zenit Izhevsk	34	15	11	8	43	31	+12	41
5	AZE	Dinamo Kirovabad	34	16	7	11	36	21	+15	39
6	KAZ	Avtomobilist Kzil-Orda	34	12	12	10	33	33	0	36
7	UZB	Avtomobilist Termez	34	14	7	13	40	39	+1	35
8	RUS	Metallurg Magnitogorsk	34	13	9	12	35	35	0	35
9	UZB	Neftyanik Fergana	34	12	9	13	30	36	−6	33
10	RUS	Lokomotiv Chelyabinsk	34	10	12	12	40	35	+5	32
11	RUS	Lokomotiv Orenburg	34	12	8	14	31	36	−5	32
12	UZB	Zarafshan Navoi	34	10	11	13	29	38	−9	31
13	UZB	Politotdel Tashkent Region	34	12	5	17	32	33	−1	29
14	RUS	Stroitel Ufa	34	12	5	17	33	39	−6	29
15	RUS	Neftyanik Tyumen	34	9	9	16	17	27	−10	27
16	KAZ	Metallurg Chimkent	34	7	12	15	33	45	−12	26
17	RUS	Uralets Nizhniy Tagil	34	9	8	17	27	46	−19	26
18	KGZ	Alay Osh	34	4	10	20	24	52	−28	18

=== Group VI (Siberia and Kazakhstan) ===
[3-1-0 point system]

Pos	Rep	Team	Pld	W	D	L	GF	GA	GD	Pts
1	KAZ	Spartak Semipalatinsk (Note: Cementnik Semipalatinsk changed name to Spartak.)	38	25	6	7	67	33	+34	81
2	RUS	TomLes Tomsk	38	21	11	6	45	20	+25	74
3	RUS	SKA Khabarovsk	38	20	11	7	39	23	+16	71
4	RUS	Avtomobilist Krasnoyarsk	38	21	6	11	66	34	+32	69
5	RUS	Irtysh Omsk	38	19	8	11	57	32	+25	65
6	RUS	Selenga Ulan-Ude	38	15	14	9	44	31	+13	59
7	RUS	SKA Chita	38	17	8	13	43	31	+12	59
8	RUS	Dinamo Barnaul	38	16	7	15	53	44	+9	55
9	RUS	Amur Blagoveshchensk	38	13	14	11	35	33	+2	53
10	RUS	Sakhalin Yuzhno-Sakhalinsk	38	13	12	13	33	40	−7	51
11	KAZ	Dinamo Tselinograd	38	13	12	13	38	47	−9	51
12	RUS	Luch Vladivostok	38	12	14	12	37	38	−1	50
13	KAZ	Vostok Ust-Kamenogorsk	38	13	11	14	30	34	−4	50
14	RUS	Start Angarsk	38	12	11	15	28	37	−9	47
15	RUS	Aeroflot Irkutsk	38	11	9	18	26	48	−22	42
16	RUS	Dzerzhinets Novosibirsk (Note: SETM Novosibirsk changed name to Dzerzhinets.)	38	9	9	20	28	45	−17	36
17	RUS	Metallurg Novokuznetsk	38	7	14	17	30	54	−24	35
18	KAZ	Traktor Pavlodar	38	7	13	18	31	43	−12	34
19	RUS	Zauralets Kurgan	38	6	14	18	30	57	−27	32
20	RUS	Vulkan Petropavlovsk-Kamchatskiy	38	1	14	23	16	52	−36	17

Source: rsssf.com

== Promotion playoffs ==
=== Final group ===
[Oct 31 – Nov 12, Sochi]

Pos	Rep	Team	Pld	W	D	L	GF	GA	GD	Pts	Promotion
1	RUS	Zvezda Perm	4	3	1	0	6	2	+4	7	Promoted
2	RUS	Avtomobilist Nalchik	4	1	3	0	2	1	+1	5	Promoted
3	RUS	Iskra Smolensk	4	1	2	1	2	3	−1	4	Additional play-off
4	RUS	Metallurg Lipetsk	4	1	1	2	3	4	−1	3	
5	KAZ	Spartak Semipalatinsk	4	0	1	3	2	5	−3	1	

Source: rsssf.com

=== Additional play-off ===
[Nov 20, 24]

Team 1	Agg.	Team 2	1st leg	2nd leg
KRIVBASS Krivoi Rog	5-1	Iskra Smolensk	3-1	2-0
