= 1969 Soviet Cup =

1969 Cup of USSR in Football
Кубок СССР

Tournament details
- Country: Soviet Union
- Dates: March 23 – August 17
- Teams: 104

Final positions
- Champions: Karpaty Lviv
- Runners-up: SKA Rostov-na-Donu

The 1969 Soviet Cup was an association football cup competition of the Soviet Union. The winner of the competition, Karpaty Lviv qualified for the continental tournament.

The competition was planned to be carried as the last year and in the spring of 1968 a qualification phase set off for most of the RSFSR groups (zones). There were played over 100 matches before the whole qualification phase was announced to be void and the Class B teams were excluded from the competition. The 1969 Soviet Cup has restarted in the spring of 1969 as competition only for the Class A teams.

== Participating teams ==
Enter in Final round	Enter in Qualification round		
First Grouppa 20/20 teams	Second Grouppa 84/87 teams		
First Grouppa ✓ Spartak Moscow; ✓ Dinamo Kiev; ✓ Dinamo Tbilisi; ✓ CSKA Moscow; ✓ Torpedo Moscow; ✓ SKA Rostov-na-Donu; ✓ Shakhter Donetsk; ✓ Zaria Lugansk; ✓ Dinamo Moscow; ✓ Neftchi Baku; ✓ Torpedo Kutaisi; ✓ Dinamo Minsk; ✓ Chernomorets Odessa; ✓ Zenit Leningrad; ✓ Ararat Yerevan; ✓ Kairat Alma-Ata; ✓ Pakhtakor Tashkent; ✓ Uralmash Sverdlovsk; ✓ Krylya Sovetov Kuibyshev; ✓ Lokomotiv Moscow	✓ Spartak Ordzhonikidze; ✓ Dinamo Leningrad; ✓ Kuban Krasnodar; ✓ Tekstilschik Ivanovo; ✓ Metallurg Tula; ✓ Shinnik Yaroslavl; ✓ Metallurg Lipetsk; ✓ Dinamo Makhachkala; ✓ Volga Kalinin; ✗ Baltika Kaliningrad; ✓ Torpedo Taganrog; ✓ Dinamo Stavropol; ✓ Rostselmash Rostov-na-Donu; ✗ Dinamo Briansk; ✓ Avtomobilist Nalchik; ✓ Trud Voronezh; ✓ Spartak Belgorod; ✓ Mashuk Pyatigorsk; ✓ Lokomotiv Kaluga; ✓ Terek Grozny	✓ SKA Khabarovsk; ✓ Rubin Kazan; ✓ Metallurg Kuibyshev; ✓ Volgar Astrakhan; ✓ Sokol Saratov; ✓ Volga Gorkiy; ✓ Kuzbass Kemerovo; ✓ Aeroflot Irkutsk; ✓ Tomles Tomsk; ✓ Spartak Yoshkar-Ola; ✓ Kalininets Sverdlovsk; ✓ Selenga Ulan-Ude; ✓ Irtysh Omsk; ✓ SKA Chita; ✓ Lokomotiv Chelyabinsk; ✓ Traktor Volgograd; ✓ Luch Vladivostok; ✓ Rassvet Krasnoyarsk; ✓ Zenit Izhevsk; ✓ Zvezda Perm; ✓ Stroitel Ufa; ✓ Volga Ulyanovsk; ✓ Dinamo Barnaul; ✗ Metallurg Magnitogorsk	✓ Dnepr Dnepropetrovsk; ✓ SKA Kiev; ✓ Metallist Kharkov; ✓ Avtomobilist Zhitomir; ✓ Zvezda Kirovograd; ✓ Karpaty Lvov; ✓ Metallurg Zaporozhye; ✓ Tavriya Simferopol; ✓ Bukovina Chernovtsy; ✓ Stroitel Poltava; ✓ Lokomotiv Kherson; ✓ Sudostoitel Nikolayev; ✓ SKA Lvov; ✓ Avangard Ternopol; ✓ Krivbass Krivoi Rog; ✓ Azovets Zhdanov; ✓ SKA Odessa; ✓ Desna Chernigov; ✓ Shakhter Kadiyevka; ✓ Lokomotiv Vinnitsa; ✓ Dinamo Khmelnitskiy; ✓ Khimik Severodonetsk
First Grouppa ✓ Spartak Moscow; ✓ Dinamo Kiev; ✓ Dinamo Tbilisi; ✓ CSKA Moscow; ✓ Torpedo Moscow; ✓ SKA Rostov-na-Donu; ✓ Shakhter Donetsk; ✓ Zaria Lugansk; ✓ Dinamo Moscow; ✓ Neftchi Baku; ✓ Torpedo Kutaisi; ✓ Dinamo Minsk; ✓ Chernomorets Odessa; ✓ Zenit Leningrad; ✓ Ararat Yerevan; ✓ Kairat Alma-Ata; ✓ Pakhtakor Tashkent; ✓ Uralmash Sverdlovsk; ✓ Krylya Sovetov Kuibyshev; ✓ Lokomotiv Moscow	✓ Zhalgiris Vilnius; ✓ Shakhter Karaganda; ✓ Lokomotiv Tbilisi; ✓ Energetik Dushanbe; ✓ Stroitel Ashkhabad; ✓ Moldova Kishinev; ✓ Dinamo Batumi; ✓ Neftianik Fergana; ✓ Alga Frunze; ✓ Politodel Tashkent Oblast; ✓ Vostok Ust-Kamenogorsk; ✓ Daugava Riga; ✓ Spartak Brest; ✓ Neman Grodno; ✓ Dinamo Kirovabad; ✓ Polad Sumgait; ✓ Zarafshan Navoi; ✓ Meshakhte Tkibuli; ✓ Metallurg Chimkent; ✓ Shirak Leninakan; ✓ Pamir Leninabad		

Source: []

== Competition schedule ==
=== First round ===
[Mar 23] 
ALGA Frunze                  w/o  Lokomotiv Tbilisi 
AVTOMOBILIST Zhitomir        2-0  SKA Lviv 
Dinamo Batumi                0-1  SPARTAK Brest 
  [Y.Shkola 75] 
DINAMO Khmelnitskiy          3-2  Desna Chernigov 
DINAMO Leningrad             1-0  Avtomobilist Nalchik 
Dinamo Makhachkala           1-2  ROSTSELMASH Rostov-na-Donu 
DINAMO Stavropol             1-0  Metallurg Lipetsk 
ENERGETIK Dushanbe           2-0  Neman Grodno 
  [V.Makarov 57, G.Petrenko 90] 
IRTYSH Omsk                  2-1  Lokomotiv Chelyabinsk 
Kuban Krasnodar              0-1  TRUD Voronezh                [aet] 
Lokomotiv Kherson            0-1  SKA Kiev 
LUCH Vladivostok             1-0  SKA Khabarovsk 
PAMIR Leninabad              2-1  Zarafshan Navoi 
Polad Sumgait                0-0  Vostok Ust-Kamenogorsk 
RASSVET Krasnoyarsk          2-1  Aeroflot Irkutsk             [aet] 
RUBIN Kazan                  2-0  Zenit Izhevsk 
Shakhtyor Kadiyevka          0-1  AZOVETS Zhdanov 
SHAKHTYOR Karaganda          w/o  Metallurg Chimkent 
SHIRAK Leninakan             w/o  Meshakhte Tkibuli 
SKA Chita                    1-1  Selenga Ulan-Ude 
SOKOL Saratov                1-0  Volgar Astrakhan 
  [Moiseyev] 
SPARTAK Orjonikidze          2-1  Metallurg Tula 
STROITEL Ashkhabad           1-0  Neftyanik Fergana 
Stroitel Ufa                 0-0  Zvezda Perm 
TEMP Barnaul                 w/o  Kalininets Sverdlovsk 
TEXTILSHCHIK Ivanovo         1-0  Volga Gorkiy                 [aet] 
  [A.Piskaryov 117] 
TOMLES Tomsk                 2-0  Kuzbass Kemerovo 
Traktor Volgograd            1-2  SPARTAK Yoshkar-Ola 
VOLGA Ulyanovsk              1-0  Metallurg Kuibyshev 
ŽALGIRIS Vilnius             2-0  Moldova Kishinev 
[Mar 30] 
KRIVBASS Krivoi Rog          1-0  Metallist Kharkov 
  [S.Sokolov] 
Lokomotiv Vinnitsa           0-2  METALLURG Zaporozhye 
  [Yeryomenko 16, Soroka 82] 
SKA Odessa                   2-0  Zvezda Kirovograd 
  [V.Lideka 22, V.Tomashevskiy 37] 
SUDOSTROITEL Nikolayev       1-0  Stroitel Poltava 
  [Kurinny 86] 
TAVRIA Simferopol            3-1  Bukovina Chernovtsy 
  [Kvanin 1, 13 pen, Klimov ? – Semyonov ?] 
[Apr 1] 
DNEPR Dnepropetrovsk         1-0  Avangard Ternopol 
  [Biba 26]

==== First round replays ====
[Mar 24] 
Polad Sumgait                3-3  Vostok Ust-Kamenogorsk 
SKA Chita                    2-1  Selenga Ulan-Ude             [aet] 
Stroitel Ufa                 0-3  ZVEZDA Perm 
[Mar 25] 
Polad Sumgait                1-1  VOSTOK Ust-Kamenogorsk       [by draw]

=== Second round ===
[Mar 27] 
ALGA Frunze                  2-0  Energetik Dushanbe 
DAUGAVA Riga                 w/o  Dinamo Kirovabad 
IRTYSH Omsk                  2-0  Temp Barnaul 
LOKOMOTIV Kaluga             3-2  Terek Grozny                 [aet] 
LUCH Vladivostok             1-0  SKA Chita 
Pamir Leninabad              0-1  POLITOTDEL Tashkent Region 
RASSVET Krasnoyarsk          2-0  TomLes Tomsk 
RUBIN Kazan                  2-1  Zvezda Perm 
SHAKHTYOR Karaganda          1-0  Shirak Leninakan 
SHINNIK Yaroslavl            2-1  Dinamo Leningrad 
  [V.Novikov, G.Nagorny - ?] 
SOKOL Saratov                2-1  Textilshchik Ivanovo 
SPARTAK Belgorod             3-0  Dinamo Stavropol 
SPARTAK Yoshkar-Ola          2-1  Volga Ulyanovsk              [aet] 
TORPEDO Taganrog             4-1  Volga Kalinin 
TRUD Voronezh                2-0  Spartak Orjonikidze 
ŽALGIRIS Vilnius             1-0  Vostok Ust-Kamenogorsk 
[Mar 28] 
Stroitel Ashkhabad           0-1  SPARTAK Brest 
  [V.Statsyuk] 
[Apr 4] 
Azovets Zhdanov              0-0  Karpaty Lviv 
Dnepr Dnepropetrovsk         0-1  AVTOMOBILIST Zhitomir 
  [V.Popov] 
KRIVBASS Krivoi Rog          2-0  Khimik Severodonetsk 
SKA Odessa                   1-0  Dinamo Khmelnitskiy 
  [V.Tomashevskiy 40] 
[Apr 5] 
METALLURG Zaporozhye         3-1  Tavria Simferopol 
  [Y.Satayev 70, Kutin 75, Kochegarov 79 – Klimov 20] 
SKA Kiev                     0-1  SUDOSTROITEL Nikolayev 
  [Poluyanov 32] 
[Apr 24] 
ROSTSELMASH Rostov-na-Donu   1-0  Mashuk Pyatigorsk 
  [G.Kachura]

==== Second round replays ====
[Apr 5] 
Azovets Zhdanov            1-2  KARPATY Lviv 
  [? – Vladimir Danilyuk, Yanosh Gabovda]

=== Third round ===
[Apr 1] 
LUCH Vladivostok             w/o  Rassvet Krasnoyarsk 
RUBIN Kazan                  3-0  Irtysh Omsk 
SHAKHTYOR Karaganda          1-0  Politotdel Tashkent Region 
SHINNIK Yaroslavl            1-0  Spartak Belgorod 
  [V.Sanin] 
Spartak Yoshkar-Ola          0-0  Sokol Saratov 
TORPEDO Taganrog             2-1  Lokomotiv Kaluga 
Žalgiris Vilnius             0-0  Daugava Riga 
[Apr 19] 
Alga Frunze                  2-2  Spartak Brest 
  [? – V.Stuk, V.Kandulinskiy] 
[Apr 20] 
AVTOMOBILIST Zhitomir        2-0  Krivbass Krivoi Rog 
KARPATY Lviv                 1-0  SKA Odessa 
  [Gennadiy Likhachov 86 pen] 
SUDOSTROITEL Nikolayev       2-1  Metallurg Zaporozhye         [aet] 
  [Poluyanov 74, Y.Derevyago 109 – Satayev] 
[May 5] 
TRUD Voronezh                1-0  RostSelMash Rostov-na-Donu

==== Third round replays ====
[Apr 2] 
Spartak Yoshkar-Ola          2-3  SOKOL Saratov                [aet] 
  [? – Shpitalny-2, Pashovkin] 
ŽALGIRIS Vilnius             2-0  Daugava Riga 
[Apr 20] 
Alga Frunze                  0-1  SPARTAK Brest 
  [V.Kuchinskiy]

=== Fourth round ===
[May 21] 
AVTOMOBILIST Zhitomir        1-0  Shakhtyor Donetsk 
  [A.Gorelov 83] 
DINAMO Moskva                2-0  Neftchi Baku 
  [Yuriy Syomin 4, Valeriy Gajiyev 69] 
SHAKHTYOR Karaganda          2-1  Dinamo Minsk 
  [A.Chentsov 37, V.Pavlov 52 – G.Sharonov 72] 
TORPEDO Taganrog             2-0  Zarya Lugansk 
  [Bulgakov 13, Pankratov 85] 
[May 22] 
CHERNOMORETS Odessa          3-2  Dinamo Tbilisi 
  [Viktor Prokopenko 46, 56, Vasiliy Moskalenko 50 – Kakhi Asatiani 20, Slava Metreveli 90] 
SUDOSTROITEL Nikolayev       2-1  Torpedo Kutaisi              [aet] 
  [Kimalov 44, Poluyanov 94 – Sanaia 18] 
KARPATY Lviv                 2-1  Ararat Yerevan               [aet] 
  [Gennadiy Likhachov 104 pen, Igor Kulchitskiy 114 – Suren Martirosyan 94] 
Lokomotiv Moskva             2-3  DINAMO Kiev 
  [Boris Kokh 71, Yuriy Karnakhin 90 – Vladimir Muntyan 15, Vitaliy Khmelnitskiy 58, Anatoliy Puzach 60] 
LUCH Vladivostok             1-0  UralMash Sverdlovsk 
  [V.Starukhin] 
Pahtakor Tashkent            0-3  TORPEDO Moskva 
  [Mikhail Gershkovich-2, Gennadiy Shalimov] 
RUBIN Kazan                  3-2  Krylya Sovetov Kuibyshev 
  [Penzin, Vorobyov, V.Kolotov – Yuriy Starkov, ?] 
Shinnik Yaroslavl            1-3  SKA Rostov-na-Donu 
  [Frolov – Vasiliy Golovko-2, Vladimir Proskurin] 
SOKOL Saratov                5-0  Kayrat Alma-Ata 
  [Y.Smirnov-3, Lipatov, Filipenko] 
Spartak Brest                1-2  ZENIT Leningrad 
  [V.Kandulinskiy 70 - Viktor Votolovskiy 60, Gennadiy Unanov 64] 
Trud Voronezh                0-0  Spartak Moskva 
Žalgiris Vilnius             0-1  CSKA Moskva 
  [Vladimir Polikarpov 63 pen]

==== Fourth round replay ====
[May 23] 
TRUD Voronezh                1-0  Spartak Moskva 
  [V.Reingold 77]

=== Fifth round ===
[Jun 12] 
SKA Rostov-na-Donu      3-0  Torpedo Taganrog 
  [Vladimir Proskurin 30, 47, Anatoliy Zinchenko 72] 
[Jun 16] 
Zenit Leningrad         0-1  TORPEDO Moskva 
  [Mikhail Gershkovich 83] 
[Jun 27] 
DINAMO Kiev             5-1  Shakhtyor Karaganda 
  [Viktor Serebryanikov 24, Vladimir Muntyan 48, Anatoliy Puzach 51, Anatoliy Bogovik 60, 88 – Y.Pavlov 29] 
DINAMO Moskva           2-1  Luch Vladivostok 
  [Vladimir Larin 21, Smirnov 29 – Osenniy 67] 
[Jun 28] 
KARPATY Lviv            2-0  Chernomorets Odessa 
  [Yanosh Gabovda 49, Gennadiy Likhachov 55] 
Rubin Kazan             0-2  SUDOSTROITEL Nikolayev        [aet] 
  [Kimalov 104, Poluyanov 113] 
[Jun 29] 
CSKA Moskva             0-0  Avtomobilist Zhitomir 
Sokol Saratov           1-2  TRUD Voronezh 
  [Y.Smirnov ? – Golodubov 3, Manuilov 42]

=== Fifth round replay ===
[Jun 30] 
CSKA Moskva             1-0  Avtomobilist Zhitomir 
  [Berador Abduraimov 47]

=== Quarterfinals ===
[Jul 14] 
Trud Voronezh           0-1  KARPATY Lviv 
  [Gennadiy Likhachov 35 pen] 
[Jul 15] 
Torpedo Moskva          1-2  SUDOSTROITEL Nikolayev 
  [Mikhail Gershkovich 61 – Kimalov 5, Averyanov 35] 
[Jul 17] 
CSKA Moskva             1-0  Dinamo Kiev                   [aet] 
  [Berador Abduraimov 104] 
SKA Rostov-na-Donu      1-0  Dinamo Moskva 
  [Anatoliy Zinchenko 76]

=== Semifinals ===
[Jul 19] 
KARPATY Lviv            2-0  Sudostroitel Nikolayev 
  [Gennadiy Likhachov 36, Yanosh Gabovda 43] 
[Jul 29] 
SKA Rostov-na-Donu      1-0  CSKA Moskva 
  [Vladimir Proskurin 45]

==== Final ====
17 August 1969

Karpaty Lviv	2 – 1	SKA Rostov-na-Donu
Likhachov 62'; Bulhakov 66'	Report	Zinchenko 20'

Lenin's Central Stadium, Moscow
Attendance: 57,000
Referee: Karlo Kruashvili (Tbilisi)
