= 1971 Soviet First League =

Soviet First League
- Season: 1971

The 1971 Soviet First League was the inaugural season of the Soviet First League and the 31st season of the Soviet second-tier league competition.

== Final standings ==
Pos	Rep	Team	Pld	W	D	L	GF	GA	GD	Pts	Promotion or relegation
1	UKR	(Ukrainian Soviet Socialist Republic) Dnipro Dnipropetrovsk	42	27	9	6	83	30	+53	63	Promoted
2	RUS	(Russian Soviet Federative Socialist Republic) Lokomotiv Moscow	42	25	12	5	81	33	+48	62	Promoted
3	UKR	(Ukrainian Soviet Socialist Republic) Chornomorets Odessa	42	21	11	10	56	33	+23	53	
4	UKR	(Ukrainian Soviet Socialist Republic) Metalurh Zaporizhzhia	42	16	14	12	51	39	+12	46	
5	RUS	(Russian Soviet Federative Socialist Republic) Spartak Ordzhonikidze	42	19	7	16	52	57	−5	45	
6	RUS	(Russian Soviet Federative Socialist Republic) Krylia Sovetov Kuibyshev	42	17	9	16	54	41	+13	43	
7	RUS	(Russian Soviet Federative Socialist Republic) Tekstilshchik Ivanovo	42	14	15	13	45	43	+2	43	
8	UKR	(Ukrainian Soviet Socialist Republic) Metallist Kharkiv	42	18	7	17	50	49	+1	43	
9	KAZ	(Kazakh Soviet Socialist Republic) Shakhter Karagandy	42	14	13	15	46	47	−1	41	
10	RUS	(Russian Soviet Federative Socialist Republic) Dinamo Leningrad	42	14	12	16	35	40	−5	40	
11	GEO	(Georgian Soviet Socialist Republic) Torpedo Kutaisi	42	12	15	15	47	53	−6	39	
12	RUS	(Russian Soviet Federative Socialist Republic) Uralmash Sverdlovsk	42	13	13	16	34	40	−6	39	
13	TKM	(Turkmen Soviet Socialist Republic) Stroitel Ashgabat	42	16	7	19	53	62	−9	39	
14	RUS	(Russian Soviet Federative Socialist Republic) Shinnik Yaroslavl	42	16	7	19	42	52	−10	39	
15	TJK	(Tajik Soviet Socialist Republic) Pamir Dushanbe	42	16	7	19	42	54	−12	39	
16	KGZ	(Kirghiz Soviet Socialist Republic) Alga Frunze	42	13	12	17	45	52	−7	38	
17	MDA	(Moldavian Soviet Socialist Republic) Moldova Chișinău	42	12	14	16	35	42	−7	38	
18	RUS	(Russian Soviet Federative Socialist Republic) Kuzbass Kemerovo	42	14	10	18	49	57	−8	38	Relegated
19	LVA	(Latvian Soviet Socialist Republic) Daugava Riga	42	10	16	16	23	34	−11	36	Relegated
20	LTU	(Lithuanian Soviet Socialist Republic) Žalgiris Vilnius	42	9	17	16	30	45	−15	35	Relegated
21	RUS	(Russian Soviet Federative Socialist Republic) Volgar Astrakhan	42	8	18	16	34	58	−24	34	Relegated
22	RUS	(Russian Soviet Federative Socialist Republic) Rubin Kazan	42	9	13	20	31	57	−26	31	Relegated

Source: rsssf.com

== Number of teams by union republic ==
Rank	Union republic	Number of teams	Club(s)
1	RSFSR	10	Lokomotiv Moscow, Spartak Ordzhonikidze, Krylia Sovetov Kuibyshev, Tekstilschik Ivanovo, Dinamo Leningrad, Uralmash Sverdlovsk, Shinnik Yaroslavl, Kuzbass Kemerevo, Volgar Astrakhan, Rubin Kazan
2	Ukrainian SSR	4	Dnepr Dnepropetrovsk, Chernomorets Odessa, Metallurg Zaporozhye, Metallist Kharkov
3	Kazakh SSR	1	Shakhter Karaganda
3	Georgian SSR	1	Torpedo Kutaisi
3	Turkmen SSR	1	Stroitel Ashkhabat
3	Tajik SSR	1	Pamir Dushanbe
3	Kyrgyz SSR	1	Alga Frunze
3	Moldavian SSR	1	Moldova Kishinev
3	Latvian SSR	1	Daugava Riga
3	Lithuanian SSR	1	Žalgiris Vilnius

== Attendances ==
#	Club	Average
1	Dnipro	28,552
2	Chornomorets	22,762
3	Shinnik	16,714
4	Kuzbass	15,810
5	Spartak Ordzhonikidze	14,571
6	Shakhter Karagandy	13,524
7	Tekstilshchik	13,381
8	Metalurh Zaporizhzhya	12,095
9	Alga Frunze	11,905
10	Volgar Astrakhan	11,857
11	Uralmash Sverdlovsk	11,762
12	CSKA Dushanbe	11,333
13	Metalist Kharkiv	10,905
14	Krylya Sovetov	10,905
15	Moldova Chişinău	8,024
16	Torpedo Kutaisi	7,762
17	Stroitel	7,748
18	Rubin Kazan	7,405
19	Žalgiris	7,238
20	Lokomotiv Moscow	6,862
21	Daugava Rīga	6,443
22	Dinamo Leningrad	2,105
