= Nikolai Osyanin =

Soviet footballer (1941–2022)

Personal information
- Full name: Nikolai Viktorovich Osyanin
- Date of birth: 12 December 1941
- Place of birth: Sobolevskoye, Tatar ASSR, RSFSR, USSR
- Date of death: 21 March 2022 (aged 80)
- Height: 1.74 m (5 ft 9 in)
- Position: Striker

Youth career
- Raketa Kazan

Senior career*
Years	Team	Apps	(Gls)
1959–1960	Iskra Kazan	20	(4)
1961–1965	Krylia Sovetov Kuibyshev	119	(17)
1966–1971	Spartak Moscow	185	(50)
1972–1973	FC Kairat	42	(3)
1974–1976	Spartak Moscow	63	(0)
Total		429	(74)

International career
1965, 1969	USSR	3	(1)

Managerial career
- 1977–1989: Spartak Moscow (youth teams)
- * Club domestic league appearances and goals

Nikolai Viktorovich Osyanin (Russian: Николай Викторович Осянин; 12 December 1941 – 21 March 2022) was a Soviet footballer who played as a striker.

== International career ==
Osyanin scored on his debut for the USSR national team on 4 December 1965 in a friendly against Uruguay. He scored less than a minute after coming on as a substitute with 19 minutes to go in the game. He did not play again for the national team until 1969.

== Honours ==
Spartak Moscow

- Soviet Top League: 1969
- Soviet Cup: 1971
