= Ukrainian Footballer of the Year =

Award of a Ukrainian organization of sports journalists

The Ukrainian Footballer of the Year is an annual poll carried out by the Ukrainskiy Football ("Ukrainian Football") newspaper. The poll is conducted among sports journalists, footballers, football managers and other people connected with football.

The purpose of the poll is to select the best Ukrainian footballer since 1969. Establishment of the poll was influenced by the French football award "Ballon d'Or" and later similar poll established in the Soviet Union. In the Soviet Union, sports journalists of the Soviet sports magazine "Futbol-Khokey" (Football-Ice Hockey) in 1964 initiated a similar poll as it was carried out by the French magazine France Football. Unlike France Football, Futbol-Khokey was not giving an award like Ballon D'Or, but published results of the poll that it supposed to carried out among its journalists. Whether or not the poll was actually held or any of sports journalists were asked for their opinion, cannot be verified.

Few years later a similar poll started to be held for the Ukrainian footballers on initiative of the newspaper Molod Ukrayiny ("The Youth of Ukraine") published by the Ukrainian branch of Komsomol (LKSMU, not VLKSM). As a sidenote, in the Soviet Union, anything to do with sport was supervised by the Komsomol. Since starting to be held during the Soviet period, the Ukrainian Footballer of the Year poll is carried out to cast a vote for footballer who are native Ukrainians and so such tradition was kept following the fall of the Soviet Union.

Sometime in 1990s Molod Ukrayiny started to publish a separate specialized addition that was concentrated on football, Ukrainskiy Futbol (Ukrainian football). Since 1991 the voting for the Ukrainian Footballer of the Year was taking place in Ukrainskiy Futbol, which with time transformed into a separate sports newspaper.

There is also another award of the best footballer in the Ukrainian Premier League that was established in 1995 by the other newspaper Komanda. That award is not restricted to the Ukrainian nationals as in case of Ukrainian Football, but rather to the Premier League players.

== Recipients ==
=== Molod Ukrainy ===
Year	Footballer	Club
1969	Viktor Serebryanikov	(Soviet Union) Dinamo Kiev
1970	Volodymyr Muntyan	(Soviet Union) Dinamo Kiev
1971	Yevgeniy Rudakov	(Soviet Union) Dinamo Kiev
1972	Oleh Blokhin	(Soviet Union) Dinamo Kiev
1973	Oleh Blokhin	(Soviet Union) Dinamo Kiev
1974	Oleh Blokhin	(Soviet Union) Dinamo Kiev
1975	Oleh Blokhin	(Soviet Union) Dinamo Kiev
1976	Oleh Blokhin	(Soviet Union) Dinamo Kiev
1977	Oleh Blokhin	(Soviet Union) Dinamo Kiev
1978	Oleh Blokhin	(Soviet Union) Dinamo Kiev
1979	Vitali Starukhin	(Soviet Union) Shakhter Donetsk
1980	Oleh Blokhin	(Soviet Union) Dinamo Kiev
1981	Oleh Blokhin	(Soviet Union) Dinamo Kiev
1982	Anatoly Demyanenko	(Soviet Union) Dinamo Kiev
1983	Oleh Taran	(Soviet Union) Dnepr Dnepropetrovsk
1984	Hennadiy Lytovchenko	(Soviet Union) Dnepr Dnepropetrovsk
1985	Anatoly Demyanenko	(Soviet Union) Dinamo Kiev
1986	Oleksandr Zavarov	(Soviet Union) Dinamo Kiev
1987	Oleksiy Mykhailychenko	(Soviet Union) Dinamo Kiev
1988	Oleksiy Mykhailychenko	(Soviet Union) Dinamo Kiev
1989	Volodymyr Bessonov	(Soviet Union) Dinamo Kiev
1990	Sergei Yuran	(Soviet Union) Dinamo Kiev

=== Ukrainskiy Football (newspaper) ===
The below table lists only the top three leaders of voting for the Ukrainian Footballer of the Year.

Year	Footballer	Club	Results
1991	Akhrik Tsveiba; 2nd Serhiy Yuran; 3rd Oleg Salenko	(Soviet Union) / (Ukraine) Dynamo Kyiv (Soviet Union) / (Ukraine) Dynamo Kyiv (Soviet Union) / (Ukraine) Dynamo Kyiv	241 (49-43-8); 148 (35-16-11); 99 (17-16-16)
1992	Viktor Leonenko; 2nd Andriy Polunin; 3rd Oleksandr Pomazun	(Ukraine) Dynamo Kyiv (Ukraine) Dnipro Dnipropetrovsk (Ukraine) Metalist Kharkiv	307 (83-20-18); 110 (23-13-15); 56 (5-16-9)
1993	Viktor Leonenko; 2nd Timerlan Huseinov; 3rd Dmytro Mykhailenko	(Ukraine) Dynamo Kyiv (Ukraine) Chornomorets Odesa (Ukraine) Dnipro Dnipropetrovsk	376 (108-24-4); 87 (8-24-15); 76 (4-24-16)
1994	Viktor Leonenko; 2nd Oleksandr Shovkovskyi; 3rd Ihor Petrov	(Ukraine) Dynamo Kyiv (Ukraine) Dynamo Kyiv (Ukraine) Shakhtar Donetsk	395 (95-43-24); 351 (69-58-28); 182 (17-41-49)
1995	Yuriy Kalitvintsev; 2nd Andriy Shevchenko; 3rd Oleh Suslov	(Ukraine) Dynamo Kyiv (Ukraine) Dynamo Kyiv (Ukraine) Chornomorets Odesa	667 (192-37-17); 231 (27-57-36); 197 (20-43-51)
1996	Serhii Rebrov; 2nd Oleh Suslov; 3rd Yuri Maximov	(Ukraine) Dynamo Kyiv (Ukraine) Chornomorets Odesa (Ukraine) Dynamo Kyiv	538 (121-65-45); 456 (82-82-46); 302 (43-55-63)
1997	Andriy Shevchenko; 2nd Serhii Rebrov; 3rd Yuriy Kalitvintsev	(Ukraine) Dynamo Kyiv (Ukraine) Dynamo Kyiv (Ukraine) Dynamo Kyiv	814 (241-39-13); 414 (41-119-53); 290 (12-82-90)
1998	Serhii Rebrov; 2nd Andriy Shevchenko; 3rd Oleh Luzhnyi	(Ukraine) Dynamo Kyiv (Ukraine) Dynamo Kyiv (Ukraine) Dynamo Kyiv	1056 (256-128-32); 612 (73-135-123); 578 (91-104-97)
1999	Andriy Shevchenko; 2nd Serhii Rebrov; 3rd Oleksandr Shovkovskyi	(Ukraine) Dynamo Kyiv / (Italy) Milan (Ukraine) Dynamo Kyiv (Ukraine) Dynamo Kyiv	1425 (407-86-32); 1005 (118-282-87); 251 (20-47-97)
2000	Andriy Shevchenko; 2nd Andriy Vorobei; 3rd Serhii Rebrov	(Italy) Milan (Ukraine) Shakhtar Donetsk (Ukraine) Dynamo Kyiv / (England) Tottenham Hotspur	1618 (507-46-5); 1090 (78-388-80); 207 (1-56-92)
2001	Andriy Shevchenko; 2nd Hennadiy Zubov; 3rd Olexandr Melaschenko	(Italy) Milan (Ukraine) Shakhtar Donetsk (Ukraine) Dynamo Kyiv	1593 (511-25-10); 848 (49-304-93); 244 (3-61-113)
2002	Anatoliy Tymoshchuk; 2nd Andriy Shevchenko; 3rd Andriy Husyn	(Ukraine) Shakhtar Donetsk (Italy) Milan (Ukraine) Dynamo Kyiv	744 (167-96-51); 494 (122-41-46); 438 (74-76-64)
2003	Oleh Venglinsky; 2nd Andriy Shevchenko; 3rd Anatoliy Tymoshchuk	(Ukraine) Dnipro Dnipropetrovsk (Italy) Milan (Ukraine) Shakhtar Donetsk	963 (220-129-45); 660 (147-92-35); 309 (30-58-103)
2004	Andriy Shevchenko; 2nd Anatoliy Tymoshchuk; 3rd Andriy Voronin	(Italy) Milan (Ukraine) Shakhtar Donetsk (Germany) 1. FC Köln / (Germany) Bayer Leverkusen	1376 (412-57-26); 656 (71-163-117); 463 (27-149-84)
2005	Andriy Shevchenko; 2nd Anatoliy Tymoshchuk; 3rd Ruslan Rotan	(Italy) Milan (Ukraine) Shakhtar Donetsk (Ukraine) Dnipro Dnipropetrovsk / (Ukraine) Dynamo Kyiv	
2006	Anatoliy Tymoshchuk; 2nd Andriy Shevchenko; 3rd Serhii Rebrov	(Ukraine) Shakhtar Donetsk (Italy) Milan / (England) Chelsea (Ukraine) Dynamo Kyiv	
2007	Anatoliy Tymoshchuk; 2nd Andriy Voronin; 3rd Oleksandr Hladkiy	(Ukraine) Shakhtar Donetsk / (Russia) Zenit Saint Petersburg (Germany) Bayer Leverkusen / (England) Liverpool (Ukraine) FC Kharkiv / (Ukraine) Shakhtar Donetsk	
2008	Artem Milevskyi; 2nd Anatoliy Tymoshchuk; 3rd Serhiy Kravchenko	(Ukraine) Dynamo Kyiv (Russia) Zenit Saint Petersburg (Ukraine) Vorskla Poltava	
2009	Artem Milevskyi; 2nd Andriy Shevchenko; 3rd Andriy Pyatov	(Ukraine) Dynamo Kyiv (Italy) Milan / (England) Chelsea / (Ukraine) Dynamo Kyiv (Ukraine) Shakhtar Donetsk	
2010	Yevhen Konoplyanka; 2nd Yaroslav Rakitskiy; 3rd Marko Dević	(Ukraine) Dnipro Dnipropetrovsk (Ukraine) Shakhtar Donetsk (Ukraine) Metalist Kharkiv	
2011	Andriy Voronin; 2nd Andriy Yarmolenko; 3rd Anatoliy Tymoshchuk	(Russia) Dynamo Moscow (Ukraine) Dynamo Kyiv (Germany) Bayern Munich	
2012	Yevhen Konoplyanka; 2nd Ruslan Rotan; 3rd Oleh Husyev	(Ukraine) Dnipro Dnipropetrovsk (Ukraine) Dnipro Dnipropetrovsk (Ukraine) Dynamo Kyiv	
2013	Andriy Yarmolenko; Yevhen Konoplyanka; 3rd Marko Dević	(Ukraine) Dynamo Kyiv (Ukraine) Dnipro Dnipropetrovsk (Ukraine) Metalist Kharkiv	
2014	Andriy Yarmolenko; 2nd Yevhen Konoplyanka; 3rd Ruslan Rotan	(Ukraine) Dynamo Kyiv (Ukraine) Dnipro Dnipropetrovsk (Ukraine) Dnipro Dnipropetrovsk	
2015	Andriy Yarmolenko; 2nd Yevhen Konoplyanka; 3rd Yevhen Seleznyov	(Ukraine) Dynamo Kyiv (Ukraine) Dnipro Dnipropetrovsk / (Spain) Sevilla (Ukraine) Dnipro Dnipropetrovsk	
2016	Ruslan Rotan; 2nd Andriy Pyatov; 3rd Andriy Yarmolenko	(Ukraine) Dnipro Dnipropetrovsk (Ukraine) Shakhtar Donetsk (Ukraine) Dynamo Kyiv	
2017	Andriy Yarmolenko; 2nd Taras Stepanenko; 3rd Denys Harmash	(Ukraine) Dynamo Kyiv / (Germany) Borussia Dortmund (Ukraine) Shakhtar Donetsk (Ukraine) Dynamo Kyiv	

=== Ukrainskiy Football (website) ===
Year	Footballer	Club
2018	Viktor Tsyhankov; 2nd Marlos; 3rd Ruslan Malinovskyi	(Ukraine) Dynamo Kyiv (Ukraine) Shakhtar Donetsk (Belgium) Genk
2019	Oleksandr Zinchenko; 2nd Viktor Tsyhankov; 3rd Ruslan Malinovskyi	(England) Manchester City (Ukraine) Dynamo Kyiv (Belgium) Genk / (Italy) Atalanta
2020	Denys Favorov; 2nd Vitalii Mykolenko; 3rd Viktor Tsyhankov	(Ukraine) Desna Chernihiv / (Ukraine) Zorya Luhansk (Ukraine) Dynamo Kyiv (Ukraine) Dynamo Kyiv
2021	no information	
2022	Mykhailo Mudryk; 2nd Artem Dovbyk; 3rd Vitaliy Buyalskyi	(Ukraine) Shakhtar Donetsk (Ukraine) Dnipro-1 (Ukraine) Dynamo Kyiv
2023	Artem Dovbyk; 2nd Heorhiy Sudakov; 3rd Oleksandr Zinchenko	(Ukraine) Dnipro-1 / (Spain) Girona (Ukraine) Shakhtar Donetsk (England) Arsenal
2024	Illia Zabarnyi; 2nd Artem Dovbyk; 3rd Heorhiy Sudakov	(England) Bournemouth (Spain) Girona / (Italy) Roma (Ukraine) Shakhtar Donetsk
2025	no information	

== Alternative awards ==
=== Komanda award (1995–2016) ===
The Komanda award for the best footballer in the Ukrainian Premier League was established in 1995 by the Komanda newspaper. It is actually called the Ukrainian Premier League Footballer of the Year (Vyscha Liha Footballer of the Year before 2008). It is being evaluated by the participants of the League, players and coaches.

Year	Footballer	Club
1995	(Ukraine) Yuriy Kalitvintsev (Ukraine) 2nd Oleh Suslov (Ukraine) 3rd Andriy Shevchenko	FC Dynamo Kyiv; FC Chornomorets Odesa; FC Dynamo Kyiv
1996	(Ukraine) Serhii Rebrov (Ukraine) 2nd Yuriy Maksymov (Ukraine) 3rd Oleh Suslov	FC Dynamo Kyiv; FC Dynamo Kyiv; FC Chornomorets Odesa
1997	(Ukraine) Andriy Shevchenko (Ukraine) 2nd Serhii Rebrov (Ukraine) 3rd Yuriy Kalitvintsev	FC Dynamo Kyiv; FC Dynamo Kyiv; FC Dynamo Kyiv
1998	(Ukraine) Serhii Rebrov (Ukraine) 2nd Andriy Shevchenko (Ukraine) 3rd Oleh Luzhnyi	FC Dynamo Kyiv; FC Dynamo Kyiv; FC Dynamo Kyiv
1999	(Ukraine) Serhii Rebrov (Ukraine) 2nd Andriy Shevchenko (Ukraine) 3rd Vladyslav Vashchuk	FC Dynamo Kyiv; FC Dynamo Kyiv / AC Milan; FC Dynamo Kyiv
2000	(Ukraine) Andriy Vorobey (Belarus) 2nd Valyantsin Byalkevich (Ukraine) 3rd Yuriy Virt	FC Shakhtar Donetsk; FC Dynamo Kyiv; FC Shakhtar Donetsk
2001	(Belarus) Valyantsin Byalkevich (Ukraine) 2nd Hennadiy Zubov (Ukraine) 3rd Serhiy Shyshchenko	FC Dynamo Kyiv; FC Shakhtar Donetsk; FC Metalurh Donetsk
2002	(Ukraine) Anatoliy Tymoshchuk (Belarus) 2nd Valyantsin Byalkevich (Ukraine) 3rd Oleh Venhlynskyi	FC Shakhtar Donetsk; FC Dynamo Kyiv; FC Dynamo Kyiv / FC Dnipro Dnipropetrovsk
2003	(Belarus) Valyantsin Byalkevich (Ukraine) 2nd Oleh Venhlynskyi (Ukraine) 3rd Serhiy Fedorov	FC Dynamo Kyiv; FC Dnipro Dnipropetrovsk; FC Dynamo Kyiv
2004	(Ukraine) Oleksandr Rykun (Ukraine) 2nd Oleksandr Shovkovskyi (Brazil) 3rd Matuzalém	FC Dnipro Dnipropetrovsk; FC Dynamo Kyiv; FC Shakhtar Donetsk
2005	(Ukraine) Oleh Husyev (Ukraine) 2nd Anatoliy Tymoshchuk (Brazil) 3rd Matuzalém	FC Dynamo Kyiv; FC Shakhtar Donetsk; FC Shakhtar Donetsk
2006	(Ukraine) Serhiy Nazarenko (Brazil) 2nd Matuzalém (Ukraine) 3rd Anatoliy Tymoshchuk	FC Dnipro Dnipropetrovsk; FC Shakhtar Donetsk; FC Shakhtar Donetsk
2007	(Ukraine) Serhiy Nazarenko (Ukraine) 2nd Oleksandr Gladkiy (Brazil) 3rd Fernandinho	FC Dnipro Dnipropetrovsk; FC Shakhtar Donetsk; FC Shakhtar Donetsk
2008	(Brazil) Jajá (Ukraine) 2nd Artem Milevskyi (Ukraine) 3rd Serhiy Kravchenko	FC Metalist Kharkiv; FC Dynamo Kyiv; FC Vorskla Poltava
2009	(Ukraine) Artem Milevskyi (Ukraine) 2nd Andriy Shevchenko (Ukraine) 3rd Andriy Pyatov	FC Dynamo Kyiv; FC Dynamo Kyiv; FC Shakhtar Donetsk
2010	(Ukraine) Andriy Pyatov (Ukraine) 2nd Yevhen Konoplyanka (Croatia) 3rd Darijo Srna	FC Shakhtar Donetsk; FC Dnipro Dnipropetrovsk; FC Shakhtar Donetsk
2011	(Ukraine) Andriy Yarmolenko (Brazil) 2nd Taison (Ukraine) 3rd Oleksandr Rybka	FC Dynamo Kyiv; FC Metalist Kharkiv; FC Obolon Kyiv / FC Shakhtar Donetsk
2012	(Armenia) Henrikh Mkhitaryan (Brazil) 2nd Willian (Ukraine) 3rd Yevhen Konoplyanka	FC Shakhtar Donetsk; FC Shakhtar Donetsk; FC Dnipro Dnipropetrovsk
2013	(Ukraine) Yevhen Konoplyanka (Ukraine) 2nd Andriy Yarmolenko (Ukraine) 3rd Marko Dević	FC Dnipro Dnipropetrovsk; FC Dynamo Kyiv; FC Metalist Kharkiv
2014	(Ukraine) Andriy Yarmolenko (Ukraine) 2nd Yevhen Konoplyanka (Brazil) 3rd Cleiton Xavier	FC Dynamo Kyiv; FC Dnipro Dnipropetrovsk; FC Metalist Kharkiv
2015	(Brazil) Alex Teixeira (Ukraine) 2nd Andriy Yarmolenko (Ukraine) 3rd Yevhen Khacheridi	FC Shakhtar Donetsk; FC Dynamo Kyiv; FC Dynamo Kyiv
2016	(Brazil) Marlos (Ukraine) 2nd Andriy Yarmolenko (Croatia) 3rd Darijo Srna	FC Shakhtar Donetsk; FC Dynamo Kyiv; FC Shakhtar Donetsk

Komanda also runs a list The best 33 football players of Ukraine (33 найкращі футболісти України) as an annual composed list of the three best football (soccer) players in each position (amplua) for the annual calendar. This is based on the Spisok 33 (ru:Список 33 лучших футболистов сезона в СССР) which ran in the Soviet era until 1992, when it became the Russian league List of 33 (ru:Список 33 лучших футболистов чемпионата России).

=== Komanda1 award ===
Year	Footballer	Club
2017	(Ukraine) Marlos (Ukraine) 2nd Andriy Yarmolenko (Brazil) 3rd Fred	FC Shakhtar Donetsk; FC Dynamo Kyiv; FC Shakhtar Donetsk
2018	(Ukraine) Marlos (Ukraine) 2nd Viktor Tsyhankov (Brazil) 3rd Taison	FC Shakhtar Donetsk; FC Dynamo Kyiv; FC Shakhtar Donetsk
2019	(Brazil) Taison (Ukraine) 2nd Viktor Tsyhankov (Ukraine) 3rd Vitalii Mykolenko	FC Shakhtar Donetsk; FC Dynamo Kyiv; FC Dynamo Kyiv
2020	(Ukraine) Viktor Tsyhankov (Brazil) 2nd Taison (Iran) 3rd Shahab Zahedi	FC Dynamo Kyiv; FC Shakhtar Donetsk; FC Olimpik Donetsk

== See also ==
- Soviet Footballer of the Year
- Heroes of Sports Year (Ukraine)
