= Albert Shesternyov =

Soviet footballer (1941–1994)

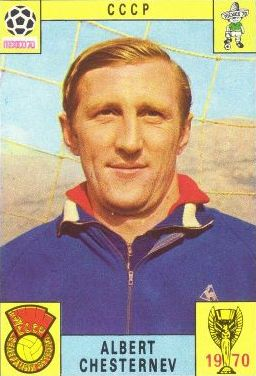
- Shesternov in 1970

Personal information
- Full name: Albert Alekseyevich Shesternyov
- Date of birth: 20 June 1941
- Place of birth: Moscow, Soviet Union
- Date of death: 5 November 1994 (aged 53)
- Place of death: Moscow, Russia
- Height: 1.83 m (6 ft 0 in)
- Position: Libero

Youth career
- CSKA Moscow

Senior career*
Years	Team	Apps	(Gls)
1959–1972	CSKA Moscow	278	(1)

International career
1961–1971	Soviet Union	90	(0)

Managerial career
- 1973–1974: CSKA Moscow (assistant)
- 1981–1982: CSKA Moscow (assistant)
- 1982–1983: CSKA Moscow
Medal record
Representing Soviet Union
UEFA European Championship
Runner-up	1964 Spain
- * Club domestic league appearances and goals

Albert Alekseyevich Shesternyov (Russian: Альбе́рт Алексе́евич Шестернёв, IPA: [ɐlʲˈbʲert ɐlʲɪˈksʲeɪvʲɪtɕ ʂɨsʲtʲɪrˈnʲɵf]; 20 June 1941 – 5 November 1994) was a football player for CSKA Moscow and the Soviet Union. He is generally regarded as the best football defender in Soviet football history.

Shesternyov was born and died in Moscow. Nicknamed "Ivan the Terrible", he was the captain of the great Soviet team of the 1960s, he earned 90 caps an appearance record only broken subsequently by Oleg Blokhin and Rinat Dasaev in the late 1980s.

An international from 1961 to 1971, the CSKA Moscow libero played and represented his country at three FIFA World Cups and two European Championships: 1964 European Nations' Cup and the UEFA Euro 1968. During the latter tournament the Soviet team faced Italy in one of the semi-finals. The game finished in a 0–0 tie, (including extra time), and according to the rules at the time the winner was to be decided by a coin toss. The Soviet side were given the opportunity to call the coin, and as captain Shesternyov called it. He called it incorrectly and they were out of the final. They finished in 4th place, after losing to England in the Third place play-off game. Shesternyov was captain of the Soviet national team for 62 of his 90 caps.

He was CSKA Moscow's youngest ever debutant at 17 years old and also the club's youngest ever captain at just 21 years old. He captained the club for nearly 10 years and played his entire career with CSKA Moscow.

Shesternyov featured in the European Championships - UEFA Teams of Tournament twice and was the Soviet Footballer of the Year in 1970, he was also voted 3rd in 1966, 1968 & 1969.

After leading CSKA to their first national title in 19 years he chose to retire from football on a high at only 30.

He was voted, by Ballon d'Or, the 14th, 11th, 10th and then 22nd best footballer in the world in 1968, 1969, 1970 and 1971 respectively. During these years he was regarded as one of the best defenders in the world and if he had chosen to join one of the many European big teams that were chasing him, many said he would have been even more so highly regarded in the footballing world. He was, however, always commended for his one-club career.

He was recently voted into the Soviet Union all-time World Cup team by football media website PlanetWorldCup.

In 1970, he became the Soviet Footballer of the Year.

== Honours ==
CSKA Moscow

- USSR Championship: 1970

Soviet Union

- UEFA European Championship runner-up: 1964

Individual

- The best 33 football players of the Soviet Union (11): No. 1 (1963-1966, 1968-1971), No. 2 (1961, 1962), N/A (1967)
- UEFA Euro Team of the Tournament: 1968
- FUWO European Team of the Season: 1968, 1969, 1970
- Soviet Footballer of the Year: 1970; Third Place: 1966, 1968, 1969.
- Sport Ideal European XI: 1971

== Personal life ==
Shesternyov was married to the Soviet figure skater Tatyana Zhuk. This marriage lasted until 1973. He married again in 1974. Due to depression and alcohol abuse, he died of cirrhosis of the liver in 1994, at the age of 53.
