= Eduard Streltsov =

Soviet footballer (1937–1990)

- Streltsov, photographed in USSR colours, c. 1955–58

Personal information
- Full name: Eduard Anatolyevich Streltsov
- Date of birth: 21 July 1937
- Place of birth: Perovo, Moscow, USSR
- Date of death: 22 July 1990 (aged 53)
- Place of death: Moscow, USSR
- Positions: Forward; attacking midfielder

Youth career
- 1950–53: Fraser

Senior career*
Years	Team	Apps	(Gls)
1953–1958	Torpedo Moscow	89	(48)
1965–1970	Torpedo Moscow	133	(51)
Total		222	(99)

International career
1955–1968	Soviet Union	38	(25)
- * Club domestic league appearances and goals

Eduard Anatolyevich Streltsov (Russian: Эдуа́рд Анато́льевич Стрельцо́в, IPA: [ɨdʊˈart ɐnɐˈtolʲjɪvʲitɕ strʲɪlʲˈtsof]; 21 July 1937 – 22 July 1990) was a Soviet footballer who played as a forward for Torpedo Moscow and the Soviet national team during the 1950s and 1960s. A powerful and skilful attacking player, he scored the fourth-highest number of goals for the Soviet Union and has been called "the greatest outfield player Russia has ever produced". He is sometimes dubbed "the Russian Pelé".

Born and raised in east Moscow, Streltsov joined Torpedo at the age of 16 in 1953 and made his international debut two years later. He was part of the squad that won the gold medal at the 1956 Melbourne Olympics, and came seventh in the 1957 Ballon d'Or. The following year, his promising career was interrupted by allegations of sexual assault shortly before the 1958 World Cup. Soviet authorities pledged he could still play if he admitted his guilt, after which he confessed, but was instead prosecuted and sentenced to twelve years of forced labour under the Gulag system (abolished in 1960 and replaced by prisons). The conviction was highly controversial, with many pointing to conflicts between Streltsov and government officials.

Streltsov was released after serving approximately half of his sentence, and in 1965 he resumed his career with Torpedo Moscow. In the first season of his comeback, the club won the Soviet championship; in 1968 Torpedo won the Soviet Cup. Streltsov was restored to the Soviet national team in 1966, and in 1967 and 1968 named Soviet Footballer of the Year. By the time of his retirement in 1970 he had pioneered innovations such as the back-heeled pass, which became known in Russia as "Streltsov's pass". He died in Moscow in 1990 from throat cancer, which his first wife alleges was a result of irradiated food served to him during incarceration. Six years later, Torpedo renamed their home ground "Eduard Streltsov Stadium" in his honour. Statues of Streltsov now stand outside the stadium bearing his name and the Luzhniki Olympic Complex in Moscow.

== Early life ==
Eduard Anatolyevich Streltsov was born in Perovo, an eastern district of Moscow, on 21 July 1937, the son of Anatoly Streltsov, a front-line soldier and intelligence officer, and Sofia Frolovna. Anatoly did not return to the family following the Second World War, instead choosing to settle alone in Kiev; Sofia therefore raised her son on her own, working at the Fraser Cutting Instruments Factory to support Eduard and herself. As a result, Streltsov had a modest upbringing, the highlights of which were playing football and following his favoured team, Spartak Moscow.

The factory recognised his talent from a young age: Streltsov became the Fraser Factory football team's youngest ever player when he was 13 years old. Three years later in 1953, a friendly match was organised between Fraser and a youth team from Torpedo Moscow. Streltsov impressed the Torpedo coach, Vasily Provornov, and after befriending him, left Fraser to play for Torpedo.

== Career ==
=== Early career ===
Aged 16, Streltsov made his debut for Torpedo during the 1954 season, appeared in every league game and scored four goals. The team finished ninth in the league, a drop from third the previous year. In his second season Streltsov was the league's most prolific goalscorer, scoring 15 goals in 22 games as his side rose to fourth place. Streltsov was selected for the Soviet national team for the first time in 1955, halfway through the season; his debut came in a friendly match against Sweden in Stockholm on 26 June, when he scored a hat-trick within the first 45 minutes as the Swedish team was defeated 6–0. On his second appearance, a friendly home game against India, he scored three goals again. A further game in Hungary and a goal against France meant that by the start of 1956, Streltsov had scored seven goals for the Soviet Union in four matches. After scoring in a match against Denmark in April 1956, he missed three international matches before returning in September with a goal after three minutes in a 2–1 away victory over West Germany. Streltsov continued to score regularly for Torpedo, managing 12 league goals during the 1956 season, but appeared in two successive defeats for the Soviets before they travelled in November 1956 to the Olympic Games in Melbourne. Streltsov scored three goals in a 16–2 victory over Australia in an unofficial match on 15 November before scoring a late winning goal in the first tournament match against the United Team of Germany nine days later. The Soviets required a replay to overcome Indonesia in the quarter-finals and met Bulgaria in the semi-final.

The match finished 0–0 after 90 minutes, and with defender Nikolai Tishchenko and Streltsov's fellow Torpedo forward Valentin Ivanov both injured, the Soviet team had only nine fit players when Bulgaria scored early in extra time. Streltsov's performance was later described by journalist Jonathan Wilson as "magnificent"; he scored an equaliser after 112 minutes and then set up Boris Tatushin of Spartak Moscow four minutes later to score the winning goal. Streltsov missed the final against Yugoslavia as the team manager, Gavriil Kachalin, believed the two forward players should be club team-mates; as Ivanov was unfit, Streltsov was dropped as well. Nikita Simonyan, who took his place, offered Streltsov his gold medal following a 1–0 victory over the Yugoslavs, an offer which the Torpedo player refused, saying "Nikita, I will win many other trophies". Streltsov received two votes in the 1956 Ballon d'Or.

Streltsov scored the first goal in a 2–0 win in a World Cup qualifying play-off match in Poland which meant the Soviet Union qualified for the 1958 World Cup. At club level, he scored 12 goals in 15 league matches during the 1957 season. Torpedo, never league champions and traditionally overshadowed by local rivals such as CSKA, Dynamo and Spartak, finished as runners-up of the Soviet Top League. At the end of that season, Streltsov came seventh in the 1957 Ballon d'Or, gaining 12 votes; by the start of the World Cup year, 1958, his international record stood at 18 goals in 20 games. Streltsov scored five goals in the first eight league matches of the 1958 Top League season, and appeared in a 1–1 friendly draw with England in Moscow on 18 May 1958.

=== Rape conviction ===
==== Accusation ====
Streltsov was known for womanising, drinking heavily and leading an extravagant life outside of football, as well as for wearing his hair in the British "Teddy Boy" style. As a key player for his club and for the Soviet national side, these traits combined to create an impression in government circles that, in Wilson's words, "Streltsov was becoming rather too much of a celebrity". The problem was brought to a head by an alleged relationship between the footballer and Svetlana Furtseva, the 16-year-old daughter of the first female Politburo member Ekaterina Furtseva. With the young Svetlana besotted by the 19-year-old Torpedo forward, her mother first met him at a Kremlin ball held early in 1957 to celebrate the Olympic victory of 1956. Furtseva suggested he might marry her daughter, to which Streltsov replied "I already have a fiancée and I will not marry her [Svetlana]." While drunk, he was later heard to remark either "I would never marry that monkey" or "I would rather be hanged than marry such a girl" (both quotes were reported), humiliating Furtseva, a minister close to Soviet Premier Nikita Khrushchev.

Streltsov became secretly engaged to Alla Demenko before leaving for the Olympics, and the couple married on 25 February 1957, halfway through preparations for the Soviet season. The Department of Soviet Football criticised both the player and his club over the timing of the ceremony. The Communist Party also seemed to distrust him, considering him a possible defector after he attracted the interest of French and Swedish clubs during tours overseas with Torpedo. His file in the party archives included the comment: "[a]ccording to a verified source, Streltsov said to his friends in 1957 that he was always sorry to return to the USSR after trips abroad." After he was sent off during a game in Odessa in April 1957, the official government sports newspaper Sovetsky Sport published an article about him titled "This is not a hero" as well as letters purportedly written by members of the proletariat, which described Streltsov as an "example of the evils of western imperialism".

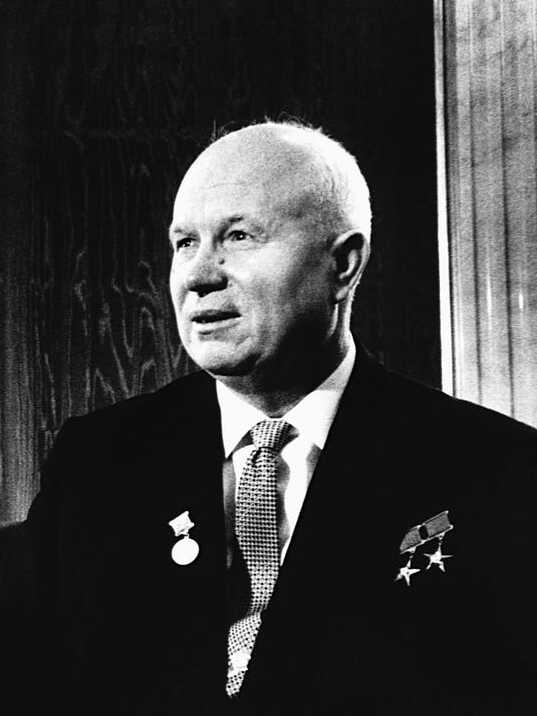
Soviet Premier Nikita Khrushchev in 1961. According to Gavriil Kachalin, who managed the national football team, Khrushchev was personally involved in the Streltsov rape case.

A week after appearing against England in a warm-up match in Moscow for the 1958 World Cup, Streltsov was invited to a party by a Soviet military officer, Eduard Karakhanov, to be held on 25 May. Streltsov and the rest of the Soviet squad were on a pre-World Cup training camp at Tarasovka, just outside Moscow, but the team had been given the day as holiday. At the end of such days, the players had to report to the authorities at Dynamo Stadium at 4:30 pm, but Streltsov and two team-mates, Spartak players Mikhail Ogonkov and Boris Tatushin, ignored this rule and went to the party anyway. Held at Karakhanov's dacha, it was also attended by a 20-year-old woman named Marina Lebedeva, whom Streltsov had never met. The following morning, Streltsov, Ogonkov and Tatushin were all arrested and charged with raping her.

Journalist Kevin O'Flynn writes that since heavy drinking had taken place at the party, the evidence against Streltsov was "confused and contradictory", even from Lebedeva herself. But the Soviet team coach, Gavriil Kachalin, claimed shortly before Streltsov's death that influence from high up in the Communist Party dictated that the player could not be helped; Kachalin said that police told him of Khrushchev's personal involvement, fuelled by a grudge held by Furtseva. According to Soviet Union team-mate Nikita Simonyan, speaking in 2006, Streltsov wrote home to his mother "saying he was taking the blame for someone else". Streltsov and Lebedeva did sleep together, Simonyan said, and he did not believe their meeting had been set up, but he was unsure about whether or not Streltsov had raped her. Simonyan proposed that consensual sex could have been twisted into a rape accusation by "the system", which he said bore ill will towards the Torpedo forward. However, in the same interview Simonyan revealed incriminating photographs of both Lebedeva and Streltsov from the time of the trial, including one in which the Torpedo player's face "was streaked from nose to cheekbone with three parallel scratches". "[T]here is the possibility that the photographs were doctored or the injuries inflicted at a later date", Wilson comments, "but Soviet justice rarely required such damning evidence." Streltsov's wife of just over a year, Alla, filed for divorce soon after the accusations were made. Apart from Streltsov himself, the only members of the team present at his trial were Ogonkov and Tatushin, who appeared as witnesses.

==== Conviction; the Gulag ====
Streltsov confessed to the crime after being told this would allow him to keep his place in the Soviet team for the 1958 World Cup. This did not happen, however; far from remaining in the national side, Streltsov was sentenced to twelve years in the forced labour camps of the Gulag, and barred from ever returning to professional football of any kind. Plans for a march by 100,000 workers at Moscow's ZiL car factory, the base of the Torpedo club, to show support during the trial, were abandoned when Streltsov was sentenced before the march could be arranged. Ogonkov and Tatushin, meanwhile, were banned from playing any kind of organised football for three years, and barred from representing the USSR for life. In the camp where he was incarcerated, Streltsov was initially victimised by a young criminal who inflicted so much physical harm on him that he spent four months in the prison hospital, suffering from injuries caused by blows from either an "iron bar or a shoe heel". Camp authorities later started to include Streltsov in football matches to calm down the inmates in times of trouble; one prisoner, Ivan Lukyanov, later said: "[w]e loved Streltsov, we believed he would return to football. And not only us."

Meanwhile, the Soviet team travelled to Sweden for the World Cup without Streltsov, Ogonkov or Tatushin. The world's press claimed that two of the competing teams were severely weakened: England by the Munich air disaster, and the Soviets by the loss of Streltsov. The Soviets reached the quarter-finals, losing 2–0 to hosts Sweden, a team defeated 6–0 by the Soviet Union during Streltsov's 1955 debut. Without Streltsov, Torpedo dropped from their second-place finish in 1957 to seventh in 1958, though the team also reached the Soviet Cup final before losing to Spartak. Streltsov's place as the club's leading scorer was taken by the 21-year-old forward Gennadi Gusarov, who had turned professional with Torpedo during 1957. The team rose to fifth in 1959 before winning the Double of Top League and Cup during the following year, with Gusarov leading the league in goals with 20. Torpedo then finished as runners-up in both competitions in 1961, with Gusarov scoring 22. Two mid-table finishes followed as Gusarov was sold to city rivals Dynamo between the 1962 and 1963 seasons, but Torpedo once again came second in 1964, losing a championship play-off against Dinamo Tbilisi after the two clubs finished equal on points.

=== Release and return to football ===
==== Amateur play ====
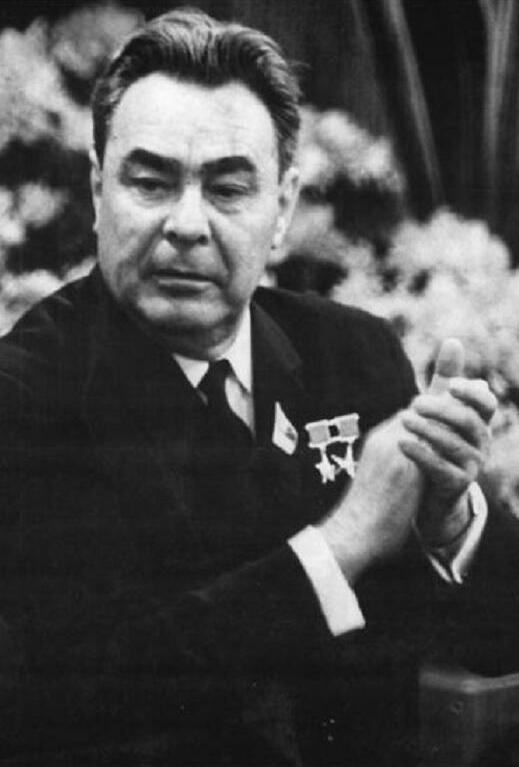
First Secretary Leonid Brezhnev (pictured in 1967) helped Streltsov to return to professional football.

Streltsov was released on 4 February 1963, five years into his twelve-year sentence, and owing to the ban from professional play began to split his time between work at the ZiL factory and the study of automotive engineering at the attached technical college. After failing to patch up his differences with Alla, he married Raisa Mikhailovna in September 1963. He started to play for the amateur factory team, which caused it to attract large crowds, both at home and away. When the ZiL side travelled to Gorky for an away match late in the 1964 season, the team's coach received orders from above not to play Streltsov, something which spectators noticed immediately when the match started; during the first half, they began to riot and threatened to burn down the stadium, chanting Streltsov's name. Worried that the angry crowd might go through with this, the Gorky factory chief ordered the ZiL coach to send Streltsov out for the second half. On stepping onto the field, the former Gulag prisoner received a standing ovation.

With Streltsov in the team, ZiL topped the factory league after winning all 11 matches. Although he was not allowed to play for Torpedo, Streltsov attended matches at his old club throughout the season. In October 1964, Khrushchev was replaced as the Communist Party's First Secretary by Leonid Brezhnev, who shortly after taking office received a letter signed by tens of thousands of people, including heroes of Socialist Labour and national and regional Supreme Soviet members, requesting the reversal of Streltsov's professional ban. Some party members were wary of a potential comeback, fearing that Streltsov's inclusion in a Torpedo squad that regularly travelled to Western Europe could lead to an international incident, but Brezhnev repealed the ban, arguing that as a free man Streltsov should be able to use his trained profession. He was cleared to return to Torpedo before the 1965 season.

==== Return to professionalism ====
Streltsov was enthusiastically welcomed back by supporters. Although he had lost some of his strength and agility, his footballing intelligence was still intact; his presence helped Torpedo to win the 1965 Soviet championship, with Streltsov scoring 12 goals from 26 league matches. At the end of the season, he came second in the voting for the Soviet Footballer of the Year behind Torpedo team-mate Valery Voronin. It was the second time that Torpedo had won the league; the club had won its first title five years earlier, during Streltsov's imprisonment. Streltsov made his debut in continental club competition on 28 September 1966, playing in a 1–0 defeat away to Inter Milan in the European Cup. He was recalled to the Soviet national team on 16 October 1966 in a 2–0 home defeat against Turkey, and scored the first international goal of his comeback a week later in a 2–2 draw with East Germany. An appearance in a 1–0 away defeat against Italy followed two weeks later. Torpedo reached the final of the Soviet Cup in 1966, but lost 2–0 to Dynamo. Streltsov matched his previous seasonal tally of 12 league goals during the 1966 Top League season.

Streltsov successfully re-established himself in the Soviet team over the following year, as he appeared in eight consecutive USSR matches, starting with a 2–0 friendly victory over Scotland in Glasgow in May 1967. He scored two goals during this run in the national side: one each in a 4–2 win against France in Paris on 3 June 1967 and a 4–3 European Championship qualifying home victory over Austria eight days later. After losing his place for the 1968 European Championship qualifying match against Finland on 30 August 1967, Streltsov missed three Soviet Union matches. He regained his place for an away friendly match against Bulgaria on 8 October, scoring a goal as the Soviets fought back from 1–0 to record a 2–1 win. He retained his place for the rest of the calendar year, and scored a hat-trick away against Chile on 17 December. He was voted Soviet Footballer of the Year at the end of the season, although he scored a relatively low six league goals during 1967, his lowest for a full season since his debut year of 1954.

Streltsov was dropped from the Soviet team for the first three national team matches of 1968. After featuring in a home friendly win over Belgium in April, he made his final appearance for the USSR in the 2–0 1968 European Championship quarter-final first leg loss to Hungary on 4 May 1968. The Soviets beat Hungary 3–0 in Moscow a week later, without Streltsov, to qualify for the final tournament on aggregate. Streltsov was left out of the tournament squad, and never played for the USSR again; after his final appearance, his international tally stood at 25 goals in 38 matches. Torpedo won the Soviet Cup during the 1968 season, overcoming Uzbek side Pakhtakor Tashkent 1–0 in the final. Streltsov retained his title of Soviet Footballer of the Year after scoring the highest seasonal total of his career, 21 (in the league), but was moved back to midfield before the 1969 season and did not score in 23 league matches during his final two years. He retired from football in 1970, at the age of 33, leaving his final league record for Torpedo over both spells standing at 99 goals from 222 games.

== Post-retirement career ==
Following a footballing career spent exclusively with Torpedo, Streltsov, a supporter of Spartak Moscow, repeatedly complained about his failure to play for his favourite team. After his retirement, Torpedo continued to pay his salary to fund his study of football coaching at the Institute of Physical Culture. Streltsov returned to Torpedo in the capacity of youth team manager following his qualification; he also spent a brief spell as manager of the first team before returning to the youth team in 1982. He also took part in matches contested by former players before dying in 1990 from throat cancer, which his first wife Alla later claimed had been brought about by irradiated food served to him in the camps. Seven years later, Marina Lebedeva, the woman Streltsov had confessed to raping, was seen laying flowers at his grave in Moscow on the day after the anniversary of his death.

Olympic policy in 1956 was to award gold medals only to members of the winning football squad who had played in the final match. Since Streltsov did not play in the final, he did not receive a medal. He was posthumously given a gold medal in 2006, after this policy was changed retroactively to allow all members of winning Olympic squads to receive medals.

== Style of play and legacy ==
Many critics consider Streltsov to be one of the finest footballers ever from Russia or the Soviet Union: British journalist and author Jonathan Wilson describes him as "the greatest outfield player Russia has ever produced ... a tall, powerful forward, possessed of a fine first touch and extraordinary footballing intelligence", while Russian author Aleksandr Nilin writes that "the boy came to us from the land of wonder". Streltsov's skilful, innovative style of play helped him to stand out in Soviet football, and his pioneering of the back-heeled pass resulted in it becoming known in Russia as "Streltsov's pass". During his early career, this technical ability combined with considerable speed and physical presence to create a formidable all-round forward player. In his later years, with his physical attributes reduced, he emphasised his skill and on-field intelligence to become more of a playmaker, playing further back and setting up attacking moves for team-mates rather than leading them himself. Indeed, for his final two seasons, Streltsov played in an attacking midfield role rather than up front. Despite the eight-year gap between his two spells as a member of the Soviet national team, Streltsov, nicknamed "The Russian Pelé", was the fourth highest international goalscorer in the country's history.

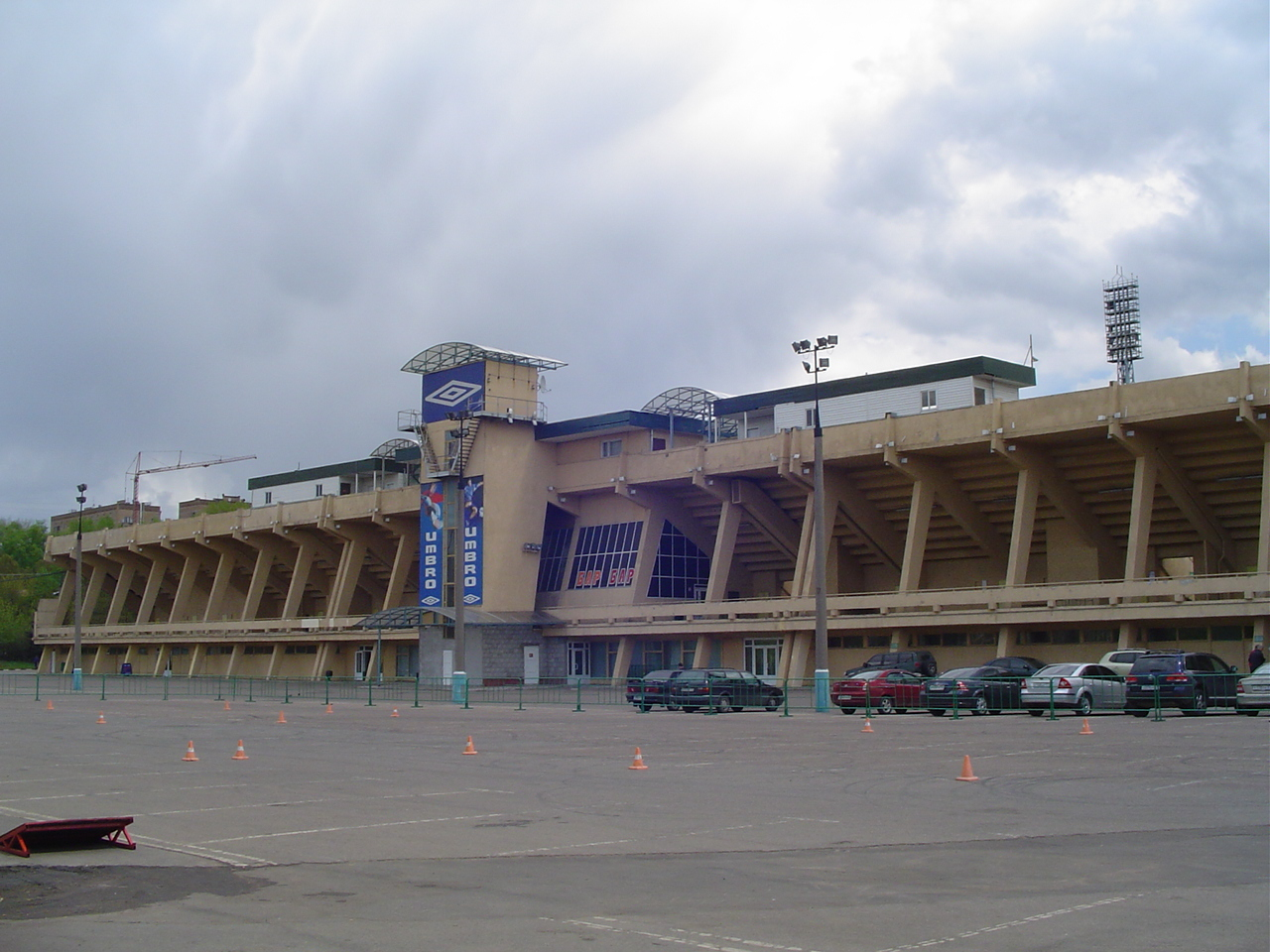
Eduard Streltsov Stadium in 2007

Torpedo Moscow's ground, Torpedo Stadium, was redubbed the "Eduard Streltsov Stadium" in 1996. A year later, the Russian Football Union introduced the Strelyets prizes as the most prestigious individual honours in Russian football, awarded annually to the best manager in the Russian league and the best players in each position until discontinued in 2003. A statue of Streltsov was constructed within Moscow's Luzhniki Olympic Complex in 1998, and another was erected by Torpedo outside the stadium bearing his name during the following year.

The Streltsov Committee, formed in 2001, was founded to attempt to have Streltsov's conviction of rape posthumously overturned. The campaign's leader, chess champion Anatoly Karpov, claimed in 2001 that the conviction had prevented Streltsov from becoming the world's best player. The Central Bank of the Russian Federation paid tribute to Streltsov in 2010, when it minted a commemorative two-ruble coin bearing his likeness. The coin was one of three minted as part of the "Outstanding Sportsmen of Russia" series; the other two pieces bore the faces of footballers Lev Yashin and Konstantin Beskov, respectively.

== Career statistics ==
=== Club ===
Statistics for domestic cup competitions unknown at this time save 1968 Soviet Cup.

Appearances and goals by club, season and competition
Club	Season	League			Soviet Cup		Federation Cup		Europe		Total	
Club	Season	Division	Apps	Goals	Apps	Goals	Apps	Goals	Apps	Goals	Apps	Goals
Torpedo Moscow	1954	Soviet Top League	22	4					–		22	4
Torpedo Moscow	1955	Soviet Top League	22	15					–		22	15
Torpedo Moscow	1956	Soviet Top League	22	12					–		22	12
Torpedo Moscow	1957	Soviet Top League	15	12					–		15	12
Torpedo Moscow	1958	Soviet Top League	8	5					–		8	5
Torpedo Moscow	1965	Soviet Top League	26	12					–		26	12
Torpedo Moscow	1966	Soviet Top League	31	12					2	0	33	12
Torpedo Moscow	1967	Soviet Top League	20	6					4	3	24	9
Torpedo Moscow	1968	Soviet Top League	33	21	6	3	–	–	3	0	42	24
Torpedo Moscow	1969	Soviet Top League	11	0					–		11	0
Torpedo Moscow	1970	Soviet Top League	12	0					–		12	0
Career total			222	99	6+	3+			9	3	237	105

=== International ===
Appearances and goals by national team and year
National team	Year	Apps	Goals
Soviet Union	1955	4	7
Soviet Union	1956	8	4
Soviet Union	1957	8	7
Soviet Union	1958	1	0
Soviet Union	1959	0	0
Soviet Union	1960	0	0
Soviet Union	1961	0	0
Soviet Union	1962	0	0
Soviet Union	1963	0	0
Soviet Union	1964	0	0
Soviet Union	1965	0	0
Soviet Union	1966	3	1
Soviet Union	1967	12	6
Soviet Union	1968	2	0
Total		38	25

Scores and results list the Soviet Union's goal tally first, score column indicates score after each Streltsov goal.

List of international goals scored by Eduard Streltsov
No.	Date	Venue	Opponent	Score	Result	Competition
1	26 June 1955	Råsunda Stadium, Stockholm	Sweden	1–0	6–0	Friendly
2	26 June 1955	Råsunda Stadium, Stockholm	Sweden	2–0	6–0	Friendly
3	26 June 1955	Råsunda Stadium, Stockholm	Sweden	4–0	6–0	Friendly
4	16 September 1955	Dynamo Stadium, Moscow	India	2–0	11–1	Friendly
5	16 September 1955	Dynamo Stadium, Moscow	India	4–0	11–1	Friendly
6	16 September 1955	Dynamo Stadium, Moscow	India	7–0	11–1	Friendly
7	23 October 1955	Dynamo Stadium, Moscow	France	1–1	2–2	Friendly
8	23 May 1956	Dynamo Stadium, Moscow	Denmark	3–0	5–1	Friendly
9	15 September 1956	Niedersachsenstadion, Hanover	West Germany	1–0	2–1	Friendly
10	24 November 1956	Olympic Park Stadium, Melbourne	United Team of Germany	2–0	2–1	1956 Summer Olympics
11	5 December 1956	Olympic Park Stadium, Melbourne	Bulgaria	1–1	2–1	1956 Summer Olympics
12	1 June 1957	Central Lenin Stadium, Moscow	Romania	1–1	1–1	Friendly
13	21 July 1957	Vasil Levski National Stadium, Sofia	Bulgaria	1–0	4–0	Friendly
14	21 July 1957	Vasil Levski National Stadium, Sofia	Bulgaria	3–0	4–0	Friendly
15	15 August 1957	Helsinki Olympic Stadium, Helsinki	Finland	6–0	10–0	1958 World Cup qualifier
16	15 August 1957	Helsinki Olympic Stadium, Helsinki	Finland	8–0	10–0	1958 World Cup qualifier
17	22 September 1957	Népstadion, Budapest	Hungary	2–1	2–1	Friendly
18	24 November 1957	Zentralstadion, Leipzig	Poland	1–0	2–1	1958 World Cup qualifier
19	23 October 1966	Central Lenin Stadium, Moscow	East Germany	1–0	2–2	Friendly
20	3 June 1967	Parc des Princes, Paris	France	4–2	4–2	Friendly
21	11 June 1967	Central Lenin Stadium, Moscow	Austria	4–3	4–3	Euro 1968 qualifier
22	8 October 1967	Vasil Levski National Stadium, Sofia	Bulgaria	1–1	2–1	Friendly
23	17 December 1967	Estadio Nacional de Chile, Santiago	Chile	2–0	4–1	Friendly
24	17 December 1967	Estadio Nacional de Chile, Santiago	Chile	3–0	4–1	Friendly
25	17 December 1967	Estadio Nacional de Chile, Santiago	Chile	4–0	4–1	Friendly

== Honours ==
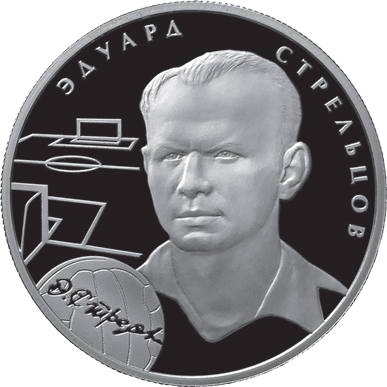
A commemorative two-ruble coin bearing Streltsov's likeness was issued in 2010.

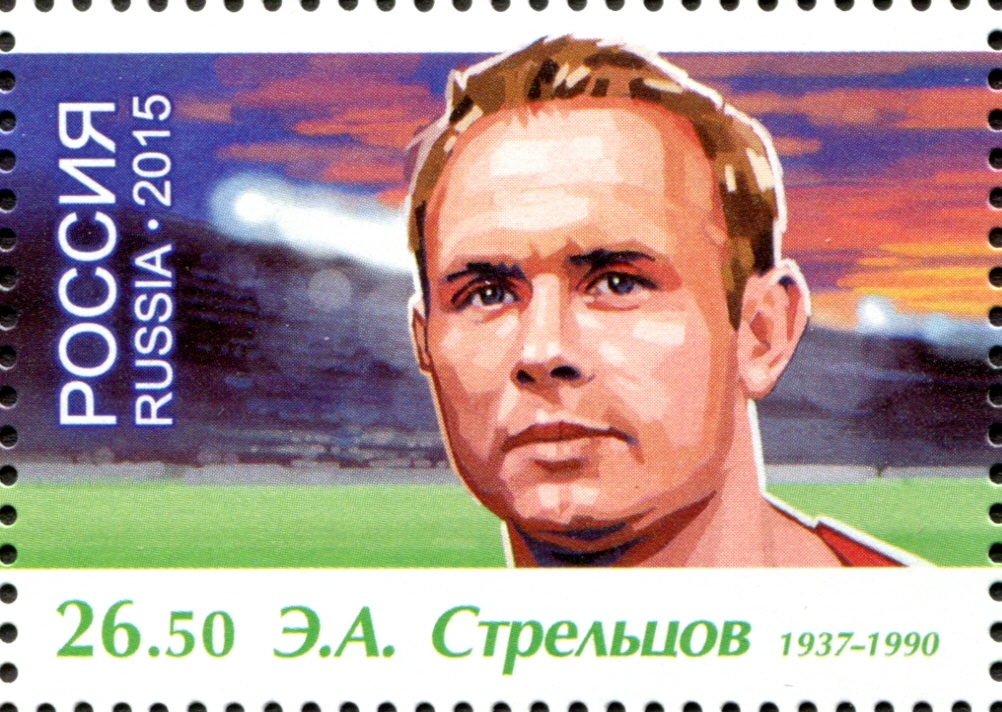
Streltsov on a 2016 Russian stamp from the series "Football Legends"

Torpedo Moscow

- Soviet Top League: 1965; runner-up 1957
- Soviet Cup: 1968; runner-up

Soviet Union

- Summer Olympics gold medal: 1956

Individual

- The best 33 football players of the Soviet Union (7): No. 1 (1955-1957, 1965, 1967, 1968), No. 2 (1966)
- Soviet Footballer of the Year: 1967, 1968; Second Place: 1965
- Soviet Top League top goalscorer: 1955 (15 goals from 22 matches)
- Ballon d'Or: 13th place (1956), 7th place (1957)
