= Kalitvintsev =

Kalitvintsev, Kalytvyntsev, Russian: Калитвинцев is a surname of Russian origin. Notable people with the surname include:

- Yuri Kalitvintsev (born 1968), Ukrainian footballer and coach
- Vladyslav Kalitvintsev (born 1993), Ukrainian footballer, son of Yuri
