= Fyodor Cherenkov =

Russian footballer (1959–2014)

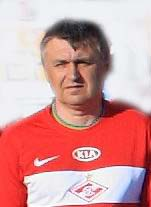
- Cherenkov in 2008

Personal information
- Full name: Fyodor Fyodorovich Cherenkov
- Date of birth: 25 July 1959
- Place of birth: Moscow, Russian SFSR, Soviet Union
- Date of death: 4 October 2014 (aged 55)
- Place of death: Moscow, Russia
- Height: 1.78 m (5 ft 10 in)
- Position: Midfielder

Youth career
- 1969–1971: Kuntsevo Moscow
- 1971–1977: Spartak Moscow

Senior career*
Years	Team	Apps	(Gls)
1977–1990	Spartak Moscow	344	(86)
1990–1991	Red Star Saint-Ouen	15	(1)
1991–1994	Spartak Moscow	54	(9)
Total		413	(96)

International career
1979–1990	Soviet Union	34	(12)
1980–1983	Soviet Union Olympic	10	(6)

Managerial career
- 1994–1995: Spartak Moscow (assistant)
- 1996–1997: Spartak Moscow (reserves assistant)
- 2013–2014: Spartak Moscow (youth assistant)
Medal record
Olympic Games
Representing Soviet Union
Men's Football
Bronze medal – third place	1980 Moscow	Team competition
- * Club domestic league appearances and goals

Fyodor Fyodorovich Cherenkov (Russian: Фёдор Фёдорович Черенко́в; 25 July 1959 – 4 October 2014) was a Soviet and Russian football midfielder who played for Spartak Moscow (1977–90 and 1991–94) and Red Star Football Club (1990–91).

== Playing career ==
Cherenkov played for Spartak Moscow for almost his entire professional club career (1977–1994; he also played for the youth team between 1971–1977), aside from a brief spell with Red Star Saint-Ouen from 1990–91. For the time spent in Spartak he received the Club Loyalty Award in 1989. He was awarded "The Attack Organizer" award in 1988 and 1989, as the most useful attack player.

At international level, Cherenkov made 34 appearances for the Soviet Union national team, scoring 12 goals. He won a bronze medal at the 1980 Summer Olympics. Although widely regarded by Spartak's fans as the team's best player ever, he was always dropped by the national team on the eve of several major tournaments, including two World Cups and a European Championship.

== Style of play ==
Cherenkov was an excellent passer and was also a good striker of the ball who scored many goals throughout his career. In his book on the history of Spartak, Robert Edelman described him as "the longest-serving and most beloved of all Spartakovtsy":

A native Muscovite, Fiodr Cherenkov (b. 1959) was a product of Spartak's school. Navigating between midfield and forward, he played with an originality and eccentricity that endeared him to the public. Cherenkov was an enigmatic and fragile personality whose capacity for unexpected improvisation fit the Spartak image of the player as romantic artist. A true original, he was the embodiment of what many of Spartak's male Moscow supporters liked to believe about themselves. Lacking great speed but quick on his feet, small of stature but possessed of great guile, Cherenkov seemed to practice a new kind of masculinity, that of the urban trickster. By the time his Spartak career was over, he was the leading point producer (goal plus pass) in the team's history.

Cherenkov was considered to be the best Soviet footballer of the 1980s.

== Coaching career ==
Cherenkov worked as a coach of Spartak's reserve team after retiring.

== Personal life and personality ==
A 2021 profile on BBC Sport relates that Cherenkov was a kind and approachable "regular guy" who could not understand his own fame. He suffered several attacks of an unknown mental illness during his playing career, and missed important games because of it, but was "widely seen as the best Soviet footballer of the decade". His daughter Anastasia was born in 1980. He died in 2014, at age 55, after collapsing outside his home. An autopsy at a Moscow hospital found a brain tumour. The profile described him as a "football genius".

== Honours ==
=== Club ===
Spartak Moscow

- Soviet Top League: 1979, 1987, 1989
- Russian Premier League: 1993
- Russian Cup: 1994

=== International ===
Soviet Union

- Olympics bronze medal: 1980

=== Individual ===
- The best 33 football players of the Soviet Union (9): No. 1 (1983, 1985, 1987, 1989); No. 2 (1980, 1982, 1988); No. 3 (1981, 1984)
- Soviet Footballer of the Year: 1983, 1989
- Club Loyalty Award: 1989
