= Gennadij Fish =

Ukrainian-German chess grandmaster (born 1973)

- Gennadij Fish in 2012

Personal information
- Born: April 20, 1973 (age 53) Simferopol, Soviet Union

Chess career
- Country: Russia (1993–1994); Ukraine (1995–2001); Germany (since 2001)
- Title: Grandmaster (2007)
- FIDE rating: 2441 (November 2026)
- Peak rating: 2550 (July 2005)

Gennadij Fish (Ukrainian: Геннадій Львович Фіш; born 20 April 1973) is a Ukrainian-German chess Grandmaster.

== Career ==
Fish was awarded the Grandmaster title in June 2007, having achieved the required norms in the German Schachbundesliga during the 2003–04, 2004–05, and 2006–07 seasons.

In 1996, he finished seventh at the Ukrainian Chess Championship in Yalta, which was won by Mikhail Golubev. In 2001, he won the IM tournament in Cuxhaven. He won the Open Bremen Championship in 2002 and 2004, the Chess.Org Cup Open in Bad Zwischenahn in 2004, and the Delme Open in Delmenhorst in 2005. He was also the Bremen Blitz chess champion in 2004 and 2005. At the 2005 German Chess Championship in Altenkirchen, seeded 12th, he finished in 11th place.

In Germany, he has played for SV Werder Bremen since 2004, winning the German team championship with them in the 2004–05 season. Prior to that, he played for Bremer Schachgesellschaft von 1877. In the French Nationale II league, he played for Échiquier Centre Vaucluse et Pays des Sorgues.

Fish transferred from the Russian Chess Federation to the Ukrainian Chess Federation in 1995, and has represented the German Chess Federation since 1 November 2001.
