= Yevhen Rudakov =

Soviet footballer (1942–2011)

Yevgeniy Rudakov
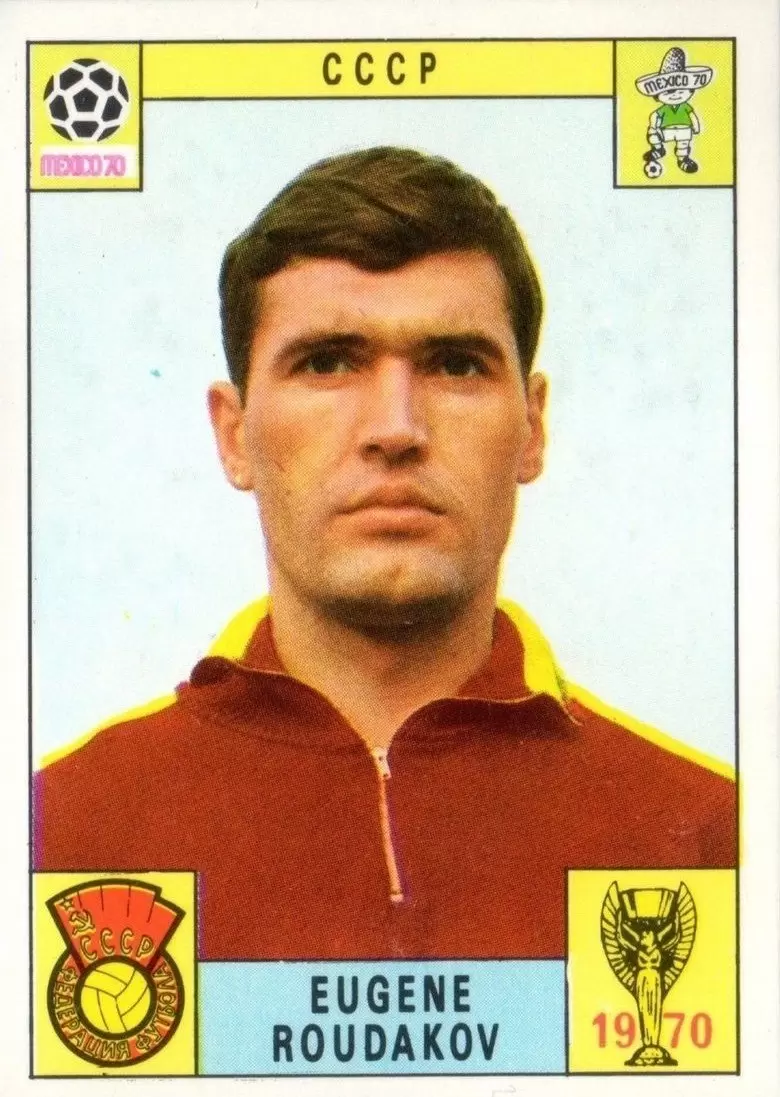
- Yevhen Rudakov in 1970

Personal information
- Full name: Yevgeniy Vasilievich Rudakov
- Date of birth: 2 January 1942
- Place of birth: Moscow, Soviet Union
- Date of death: 21 December 2011 (aged 69)
- Place of death: Kyiv, Ukraine
- Position: Goalkeeper

Youth career
- 1957–1959: Torpedo Moscow

Senior career*
Years	Team	Apps	(Gls)
1960	Torpedo Moscow		
1961–1962	Sudnobudivnyk Mykolaiv		
1962–1977	Dynamo Kyiv	297	(0)

International career
1968–1976	USSR	42	(0)
1972	USSR Olympic	6	(0)

Managerial career
- 1979: Spartak Ivano-Frankivsk
- 1980–1990: Zmina Kyiv (youth club)
- 1994: Kremin Kremenchuk
Medal record
Men's football
Representing Soviet Union
Olympic Games
Bronze medal – third place	1972 Munich	Team competition
UEFA European Championship
Runner-up	1972 Belgium
- * Club domestic league appearances and goals

Yevgeniy Vasilievich Rudakov (Russian: Евгений Васильевич Рудаков; 2 January 1942 – 21 December 2011) was a Soviet footballer who played as a goalkeeper. In 1971, he was recognized as the Best Ukrainian Player of the Year becoming the first foreigner to be awarded such honors.

A six-time domestic champion of the Soviet Union with Dynamo Kyiv, Rudakov also helped Dynamo win the Soviet Cup twice, the Cup Winners' Cup and the UEFA Super Cup. He also represented the USSR national football team and helped them reach the finals of Euro 1972 finals. After the UEFA Euro 1972 along with his teammates by Soviet Union national football team – Revaz Dzodzuashvili and Murtaz Khurtsilava – he was included in the team of the tournament, along with such great players as Franz Beckenbauer, Gerd Müller, Paul Breitner, Uli Hoeness and Günter Netzer. In 1971 Rudakov was also chosen the Soviet Footballer of the Year and the best goalkeeper of the USSR in 1969, 1971, and 1972.

At the Olympic Games 1972 he earned four wins and two shutouts. He also won 21 games with the regular senior squad and finished 22 games without allowing any goals. His career goals against average was at 0.69.

After finishing his playing career, he coached few Ukraine-based clubs, but mostly stayed on at Dynamo Kyiv's sport school as a children coach.

He was nominated twice for the Ballon d'Or, in 1971 when he came 12th, and 1972 when he came 18th.

== Honours ==
Dynamo Kyiv

- Soviet Top League: 1966, 1967, 1968, 1971, 1974, 1975, 1977
- Soviet Cup: 1964, 1966, 1974
- UEFA Cup Winners' Cup: 1974–75
- UEFA Super Cup: 1975

Soviet Union

- Olympic Games bronze medal: 1972
- UEFA European Championship runner-up: 1972

Individual

- UEFA European Championship Team of the Tournament: 1972
- Ukrainian Footballer of the Year: 1971
- Soviet Footballer of the Year: 1971; Second Place: 1972
- ADN Eastern European Footballer of the Season: 1971
- FUWO European Team of the Season: 1972
- IFFHS European Goalkeeper of the Century: 42nd place
