= Rinat Dasayev =

Russian footballer (born 1957)

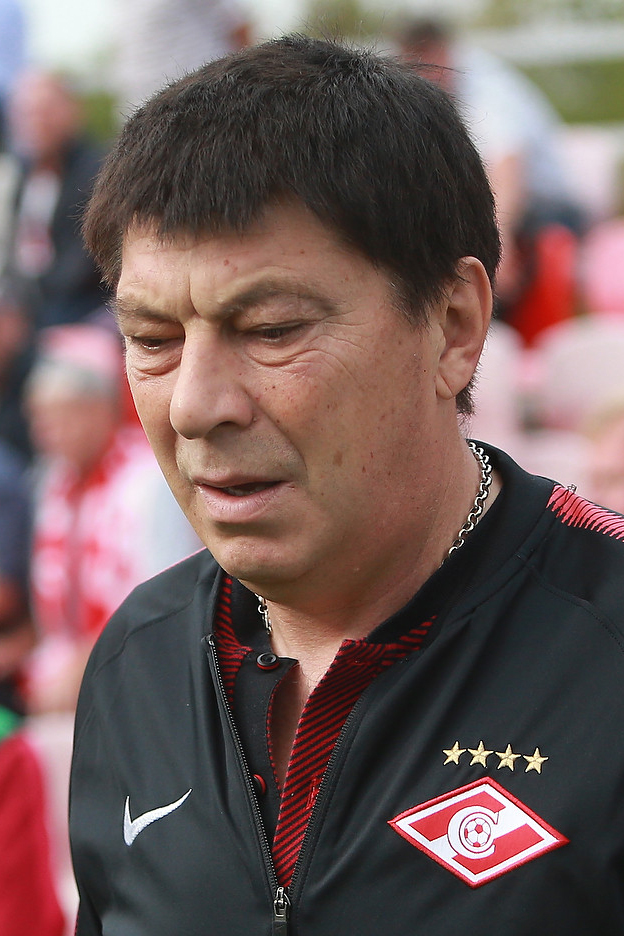
- Dasayev coaching Spartak-2 in 2017

Personal information
- Full name: Rinat Fayzrakhmanovich Dasayev
- Date of birth: 13 June 1957 (age 69)
- Place of birth: Astrakhan, Russian SFSR, Soviet Union
- Height: 1.89 m (6 ft 2 in)
- Position: Goalkeeper

Team information
- Current team: FC Spartak-2 Moscow (GK consultant)

Youth career
- 1975: Volgar Astrakhan

Senior career*
Years	Team	Apps	(Gls)
1976–1977	Volgar Astrakhan	26	(0)
1977–1988	Spartak Moscow	335	(0)
1988–1991	Sevilla	59	(0)
Total		420	(0)

International career
1979–1990	Soviet Union	91	(0)
Medal record
Men's football
Representing Soviet Union
UEFA European Championship
Runner-up	1988 West Germany
Olympic Games
Bronze medal – third place	1980 Moscow	Team
- * Club domestic league appearances and goals

Rinat Fayzrakhmanovich Dasayev (Russian: Ринат Файзрахманович Дасаев, Tatar: Ринат Фәйзерахман улы Дасаев; born 13 June 1957) is a Russian football coach and a former goalkeeper.

Throughout his club career, he played for Volgar Astrakhan, Spartak Moscow and Sevilla. At international level, he played at three World Cups with the Soviet national team, also winning a bronze medal at the 1980 Summer Olympics and a runners-up medal at UEFA Euro 1988.

Regarded as one of the best goalkeepers in the world during the 1980s, he is considered the second-best Soviet goalkeeper ever behind Lev Yashin. He was awarded the title of the World's Best Goalkeeper of the Year award in 1988 by the IFFHS. In a 1999 poll by the same organisation, he was elected the sixteenth greatest European goalkeeper of the twentieth century, alongside Gianpiero Combi, and the seventeenth greatest goalkeeper of the century. In 2004, he was named by Pelé as one of the top 125 greatest living footballers.

Following his retirement, he worked as a coach, and currently serves as a goalkeeping consultant with FC Spartak-2 Moscow and Spartak's youth teams.

== Club career ==
Dasayev played as a goalkeeper for the Russian football club Spartak Moscow during most of the 1980s. He won the Soviet championship in 1979 and 1987 and was named Best Soviet Goalkeeper by Ogonyok (Огонëк) magazine in 1980, 1982, 1983, 1985, 1987, 1988. In 1982, he was named Soviet Footballer of the Year. After his contract ran out with the Spanish club Sevilla FC in the early 1990s, Dasayev retired from the sport.

== International career ==
Dasayev played for the Soviet national team at the 1980 Summer Olympics, winning the bronze medal. He appeared in the 1982, 1986 and 1990 FIFA World Cups, as well as the Euro 88, where the Soviet Union reached the final, only to lose out to the Netherlands. In total, he was capped 91 times from 1979 to 1990, being the second-most capped player ever for the Soviet Union.

== Style of play ==
Nicknamed "The Iron Curtain" and "The Cat", Dasayev is considered to be one of the greatest goalkeepers of all time, and one of the best players in the world in his position during the 1980s; he is also regarded as the second-best Russian goalkeeper ever after Yashin. In addition to his shot-stopping abilities as a goalkeeper, Dasayev was also known for his trademark sudden long throws, which he would make immediately after stopping a shot, in order to start quick counter-attacks from the back; he was also known for his particular diving technique, which often saw him attempt saves with only one arm, in a similar manner to his Italian contemporary Franco Tancredi. A tall and well-rounded goalkeeper with a slender physique, he possessed an excellent positional sense, and often positioned himself in very deep positions, rarely straying from his goal-line, and preferring to remain between the posts throughout the course of a match. He was also known for his efficient, rather than spectacular, playing style, as well as his ability to organise his defence. Considered to be the goalkeeping heir of Lev Yashin in Soviet football, he often drew wide praise for his ability in the press. However, critical opinion of Dasayev was occasionally divided; Italian sports journalist Gianni Brera, for example, believed that he was overrated in the media.

== After retirement ==
Dasayev retired from professional football in the early 1990s, following his time with Sevilla. In 1993, he became the goalkeeping coach of Sevilla under the tuner of Luis Aragonés as coach and of Sevilla Atlético for a season. In 2001, he traveled to Vietnam to play some friendly matches between legend players of Spartak Moscow and Hanoi XI, which ended 3–3. He was appointed as the 2008 UEFA Champions League Final Ambassador. Dasayev was a member of Russia's committee that won the bid to hold the 2018 FIFA World Cup. Unlike most of other legends and football pundits in Russia following Russia's quarter-finals feat in 2018 World Cup, Dasayev criticized the Russian team and believed quarter-finals can't be considered as an achievement.

He had to retire from active coaching in late 2018 due to knee injuries and currently works as goalkeeping consultant with FC Spartak-2 Moscow and Spartak's youth teams.

== Personal life ==
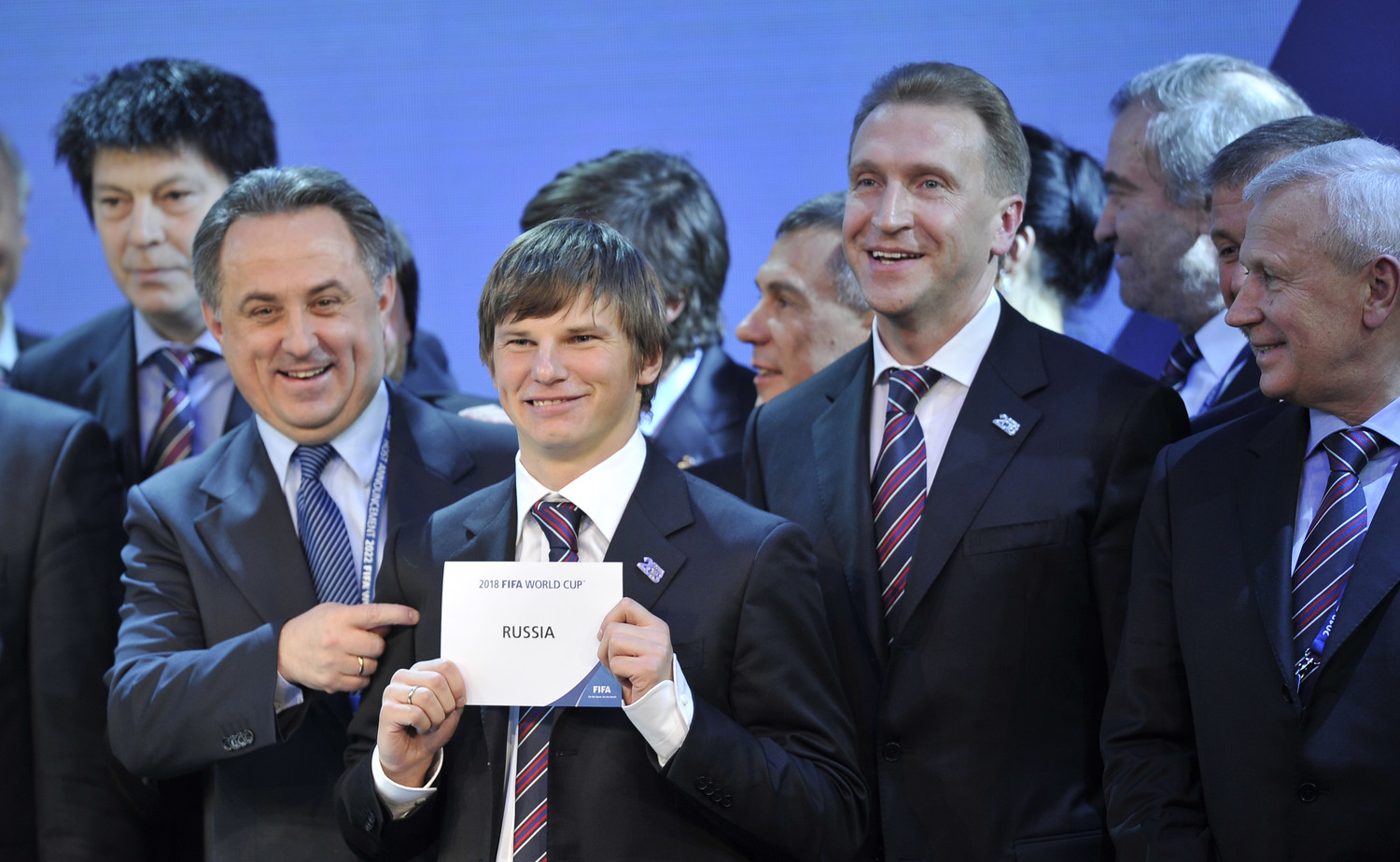
Dasayev (far left, back row) celebrates winning the World Cup bid with Andrey Arshavin (center) and others

Dasayev is a Muslim, an ethnic Tatar.

During his stint at Sevilla FC, the club's fans nicknamed him "Rafaé", since they struggled to pronounce his surname.

== Honours ==
Spartak Moscow

- Soviet Top League: 1979, 1987; runner-up: 1980, 1981, 1983, 1984, 1985
- Soviet Cup runner-up: 1981

Soviet Union

- UEFA European Football Championship runner-up: 1988

Individual

- The best 33 football players of the Soviet Union (10): No. 1 (1979–1983, 1985–1988); No. 2 (1984)
- Soviet Footballer of the Year: 1982
- Soviet Goalkeeper of the Year Award (5)
- Guerin Sportivo All-Star Team: 1982, 1983, 1986
- ADN Eastern European Footballer of the Season: 1983
- Onze Mondial: 1983, 1988
- World Soccer World XI: 1984, 1986, 1987
- IFFHS World's Best Goalkeeper: 1988
- UEFA Jubilee Poll (2004): #97
- Golden Foot Legends Award: 2015
- FIFA 100
