= 1972 Ballon d'Or =

Annual association football award event in France

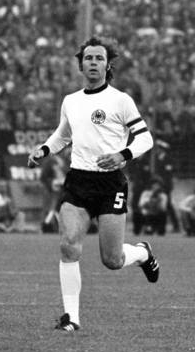
- 1972 Ballon d'Or winner, Franz Beckenbauer
- Date: 26 December 1972
- Presented by: France Football

Highlights
- Won by: (West Germany) Franz Beckenbauer (1st award)
- Website: ballondor.com

The 1972 Ballon d'Or, given to the best football player in Europe as judged by a panel of sports journalists from UEFA member countries, was awarded to the West German defender Franz Beckenbauer on 26 December 1972. There were 25 voters, from Austria, Belgium, Bulgaria, Czechoslovakia, Denmark, East Germany, England, Finland, France, Greece, Hungary, Italy, Luxembourg, the Netherlands, Poland, Portugal, Republic of Ireland, Romania, Soviet Union, Spain, Sweden, Switzerland, Turkey, West Germany and Yugoslavia. Beckenbauer became the second West German national and Bayern Munich player to win the trophy after Gerd Müller (1970).

== Rankings ==
Rank	Name	Club(s)	Nationality	Points
1	Franz Beckenbauer	(West Germany) Bayern Munich	West Germany	81
2	Gerd Müller	(West Germany) Bayern Munich	West Germany	79
2	Günter Netzer	(West Germany) Borussia Mönchengladbach	West Germany	79
4	Johan Cruyff	(Netherlands) Ajax	Netherlands	73
5	Piet Keizer	(Netherlands) Ajax	Netherlands	13
6	Kazimierz Deyna	(Poland) Legia Warsaw	Poland	6
7	Gordon Banks	(England) Stoke City	England	4
7	Barry Hulshoff	(Netherlands) Ajax	Netherlands	4
7	Włodzimierz Lubański	(Poland) Górnik Zabrze	Poland	4
7	Bobby Moore	(England) West Ham United	England	4
11	Hristo Bonev	(Bulgaria) Lokomotiv Plovdiv	Bulgaria	3
11	Murtaz Khurtsilava	(Soviet Union) Dinamo Tbilisi	Soviet Union	3
11	Gerrie Mühren	(Netherlands) Ajax	Netherlands	3
11	Paul Van Himst	(Belgium) Anderlecht	Belgium	3
15	Antal Dunai	(Hungary) Újpest	Hungary	2
15	Eusébio	(Portugal) Benfica	Portugal	2
15	Sandro Mazzola	(Italy) Internazionale	Italy	2
18	Amancio	(Spain) Real Madrid	Spain	1
18	Paul Breitner	(West Germany) Bayern Munich	West Germany	1
18	Giorgio Chinaglia	(Italy) Lazio	Italy	1
18	Dragan Džajić	(Socialist Federal Republic of Yugoslavia) Red Star Belgrade	Yugoslavia	1
18	Johnny Giles	(England) Leeds United	Republic of Ireland	1
18	John Greig	(Scotland) Rangers	Scotland	1
18	Johan Neeskens	(Netherlands) Ajax	Netherlands	1
18	Gianni Rivera	(Italy) Milan	Italy	1
18	Yevhen Rudakov	(Soviet Union) Dynamo Kyiv	Soviet Union	1
18	Marius Trésor	(France) Marseille	France	1
