= Valery Voronin =

Soviet footballer

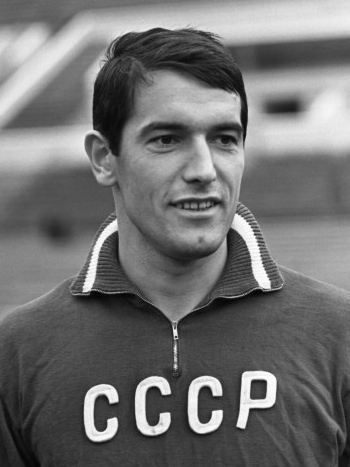
- Voronin in 1966

Personal information
- Full name: Valery Ivanovich Voronin
- Date of birth: 17 July 1939
- Place of birth: Moscow, Russian SFSR, Soviet Union
- Date of death: 19 May 1984 (aged 44)
- Place of death: Moscow, Russian SFSR, Soviet Union
- Height: 1.81 m (5 ft 11 in)
- Position: Defensive midfielder

Youth career
- 1952: "Kauchuk" factory team
- 1953–1954: FC Torpedo Moscow
- 1955–1957: FShM Moscow

Senior career*
| Years | Team | Apps | (Gls) |
| 1958–1969 | FC Torpedo Moscow | 219 | (26) |

International career
| 1960–1968 | USSR | 63 | (5) |
Medal record
Representing Soviet Union
UEFA European Championship
| Runner-up | 1964 Spain |
- * Club domestic league appearances and goals

Valery Ivanovich Voronin (Russian: Валерий Иванович Воронин; 17 July 1939 – 19 May 1984) was a Soviet footballer who represented Torpedo Moscow and the Soviet national team. He was a versatile defensive midfielder whose impressive technical abilities and hard tackling made him one of the most complete midfielders of the 1960s. He was also capable of playing as a central defender.

== Early life ==
Valery Voronin was born in Moscow, on 17 July 1939. He started playing football in the child team of the Kauchuk factory in 1952. Then Valery moved to the famous FShM, the youth football school that raised many famous players including Igor Chislenko and Vladimir Fedotov. He played for FShM until 1958 when he joined Torpedo Moscow.

== Career ==
During his club career, Voronin played for FC Torpedo Moscow, winning the championship twice, and was the Soviet Footballer of the Year in 1964 and 1965. Between 1960 and 1968 Voronin earned 63 caps and scored 5 goals for the USSR national football team, and represented the country in the 1962 FIFA World Cup and the 1966 FIFA World Cup World Cups. Voronin was considered an individualist which at times conflicted with the ethos of his national team. During the summer of 1968, he was involved in a serious car accident from which he recovered physically but which left him psychologically scarred. He became a heavy drinker and in May 1984 was found murdered. The investigation into his murder never turned up any leads.

== Honours ==
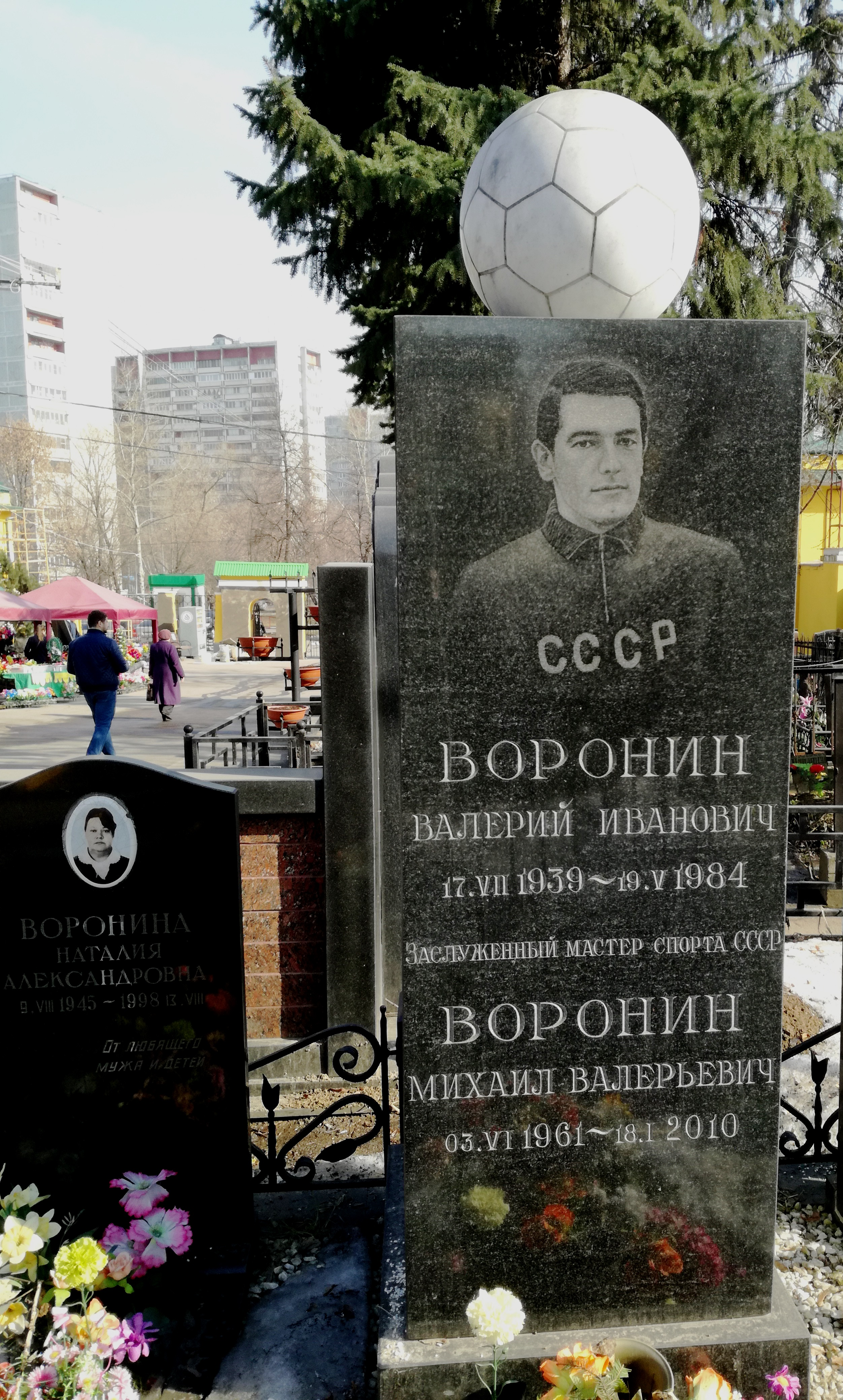
Voronin's grave at Danilov Cemetery

=== Club ===
- Soviet Top League: 1960, 1965
- Soviet Cup: 1960
- Soviet Footballer of the Year: 1964, 1965

=== Individual ===
- The best 33 football players of the Soviet Union (6): No. 1 (1961, 1963-1965), No. 2 (1960, 1966)
- Soviet Footballer of the Year: 1964, 1965
- ADN Eastern European Footballer of the Season: 1964
- FUWO European Team of the Year: 1965
- FIFA World Cup All-Star Team: 1962
