= 1957 Ballon d'Or =

Annual football award event in France

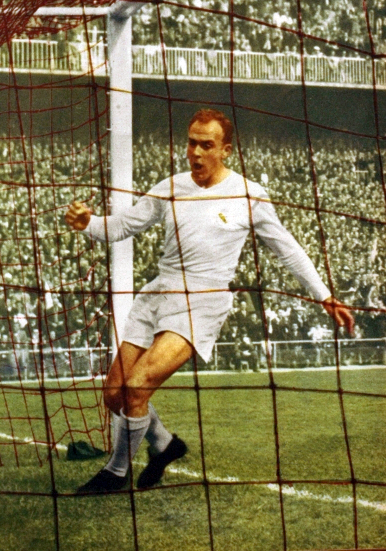
- 1957 Ballon d'Or winner, Alfredo Di Stéfano
- Date: 17 December 1957
- Location: Paris, France
- Presented by: France Football

Highlights
- Won by: (Spain) Alfredo Di Stéfano (1st award)
- Website: ballondor.com

The 1957 Ballon d'Or, given to the best football player in Europe as judged by a panel of sports journalists from UEFA member countries, was awarded to Alfredo Di Stéfano on 17 December 1957.

== Rankings ==
Rank	Name	Club(s)	Nationality	Points
1	Alfredo Di Stéfano	(Spain) Real Madrid	Spain (Note: Despite being born in Argentina, Alfredo Di Stéfano acquired Spanish citizenship in 1956, and went on to play for the Spain national team.)	72
2	Billy Wright	(England) Wolverhampton Wanderers	England	19
3	Duncan Edwards	(England) Manchester United	England	16
3	Raymond Kopa	(Spain) Real Madrid	France	16
5	László Kubala	(Spain) Barcelona	Hungary	15
6	John Charles	(England) Leeds United (Italy) Juventus	Wales	14
7	Eduard Streltsov	(Soviet Union) Torpedo Moscow	Soviet Union	12
8	Tommy Taylor	(England) Manchester United	England	10
9	József Bozsik	(Hungary) Budapest Honvéd	Hungary	9
9	Igor Netto	(Soviet Union) Spartak Moscow	Soviet Union	9
11	Lev Yashin	(Soviet Union) Dynamo Moscow	Soviet Union	8
12	Paco Gento	(Spain) Real Madrid	Spain	7
12	Gyula Grosics	(Hungary) Budapest Honvéd (Hungary) Tatabánya	Hungary	7
14	Danny Blanchflower	(England) Tottenham Hotspur	Northern Ireland	4
14	Miloš Milutinović	(Socialist Federal Republic of Yugoslavia) Partizan	Yugoslavia	4
14	Juan Alberto Schiaffino	(Italy) Milan	Italy	4
17	Gerhard Hanappi	(Austria) Rapid Wien	Austria	3
17	Johnny Haynes	(England) Fulham	England	3
17	Stanley Matthews	(England) Blackpool	England	3
20	Sándor Kocsis	(Switzerland) Young Fellows Zürich	Hungary	2
20	Horst Szymaniak	(West Germany) Wuppertaler SV	West Germany	2
22	Kurt Hamrin	(Italy) Padova	Sweden	1
22	Ladislav Novák	(Czechoslovakia) Dukla Prague	Czechoslovakia	1
