= Vladimir Astapovsky =

Soviet footballer (1946–2012)

Personal information
- Full name: Vladimir Aleksandrovich Astapovsky
- Date of birth: 16 July 1946
- Place of birth: Bryansk, Russian SFSR
- Date of death: April 12, 2012 (aged 65)
- Place of death: Moscow, Russia
- Height: 1.86 m (6 ft 1 in)
- Position: Goalkeeper

Youth career
- FC Dynamo Bryansk

Senior career*
Years	Team	Apps	(Gls)
1964	Neftchi Baku		
1965–1968	SKChF Sevastopol		
1969–1980	CSKA Moscow	226	(−262)
1981–1982	SKA Khabarovsk	19	

International career
1975–1977	USSR	11	(−12)
- * Club domestic league appearances and goals

Olympic medal record

Representing the Soviet Union

Men's football
Bronze medal – third place	1976 Montreal	Team

Vladimir Aleksandrovich Astapovsky (Russian: Владимир Александрович Астаповский; July 16, 1946 – April 12, 2012) was a Soviet football player. He was born in Bryansk.

== Honours ==
- Soviet Top League winner: 1970.
- Olympic bronze: 1976.
- Soviet Goalkeeper of the Year: 1976.
- Soviet Footballer of the Year: 1976.
- Medal "For Distinguished Labour": 1977.
- Honored Master of Sports of Russia: 2003.

== International career ==
Astapovsky made his debut for USSR national football team on November 29, 1975, in a friendly against Romania. He played in the qualifiers for the 1978 FIFA World Cup, but his nation did not qualify.
