= 1956 Soviet Class B =

Soviet Class B
- Season: 1956

Following are the results of the 1956 Soviet First League football championship. FC Spartak Minsk and FC Krylya Sovetov Kuibyshev winning the championship.

== Final standings ==
=== Zone I ===
Pos	Rep	Team	Pld	W	D	L	GF	GA	GD	Pts	Promotion
1	BLR	Spartak Minsk	34	18	11	5	45	26	+19	47	Promoted
2	RUS	Torpedo Taganrog	34	18	10	6	65	33	+32	46	
3	UKR	Metallurg Zaporozhye	34	21	4	9	54	35	+19	46	
4	RUS	Shakhtyor Mosbass (Note: Shakhtyor Stalinogorsk relocated to Mosbass.)	34	19	6	9	56	36	+20	44	
5	UKR	ODO Lvov	34	16	9	9	49	25	+24	41	
6	UKR	ODO Kiev	34	15	9	10	43	27	+16	39	
7	RUS	Krylya Sovetov Stupino	34	14	10	10	51	33	+18	38	
8	RUS	Krasnoye Znamya Ivanovo	34	13	10	11	37	36	+1	36	
9	LTU	Spartak Vilnius	34	12	11	11	51	29	+22	35	
10	UKR	Avangard Kharkov	34	14	7	13	40	44	−4	35	
11	EST	Dinamo Tallinn	34	11	10	13	36	44	−8	32	
12	UKR	Spartak Stanislav	34	12	6	16	49	57	−8	30	
13	UKR	Spartak Uzhgorod	34	7	15	12	28	33	−5	29	
14	UKR	Metallurg Dnepropetrovsk	34	10	9	15	40	58	−18	29	
15	UKR	Pishchevik Odessa	34	8	10	16	40	57	−17	26	
16	LVA	Daugava Riga	34	9	8	17	27	48	−21	26	
17	RUS	Spartak Kalinin	34	8	9	17	27	48	−21	25	
18	KAR	ODO Petrozavodsk (Note: On 16 July 1956 the Karelo-Finnish SSR was annexed by the Russian SFSR.)	34	2	4	28	20	89	−69	8	

Source: rsssf.com

=== Number of teams by republics ===
Number	Union republics	Team(s)
8	Ukrainian SSR	FC Metallurg Zaporozhye, ODO Lvov, ODO Kiev, FC Avangard Kharkov, FC Spartak Stanislav, FC Spartak Uzhgorod, FC Metallurg Dnepropetrovsk, FC Pischevik Odessa
5	Russian SFSR	FC Torpedo Taganrog, FC Shakhter Mosbass, FC Krylya Sovetov Stupino, FC Krasnoye Znamya Ivanovo, FC Spartak Kalinin
1	Belarusian SSR	FC Spartak Minsk
1	Lithuanian SSR	FC Spartak Vilnius
1	Estonian SSR	FC Dinamo Tallinn
1	Latvian SSR	FC Daugava Riga
1	Karelo-Finnish SSR	ODO Petrozavodsk

=== Zone II ===
Pos	Rep	Team	Pld	W	D	L	GF	GA	GD	Pts	Promotion
1	RUS	Krylya Sovetov Kuibyshev	34	26	5	3	84	19	+65	57	Promoted
2	GEO	ODO Tbilisi	34	24	7	3	98	32	+66	55	
3	ARM	Spartak Yerevan	34	18	10	6	72	27	+45	46	
4	RUS	Neftyanik Krasnodar	34	19	4	11	70	52	+18	42	
5	AZE	Neftyanik Baku	34	16	7	11	71	53	+18	39	
6	RUS	Krylya Sovetov Voronezh	34	13	13	8	40	34	+6	39	
7	RUS	Torpedo Gorkiy	34	16	6	12	55	48	+7	38	
8	RUS	Zenit Izhevsk	34	13	12	9	50	49	+1	38	
9	RUS	Krylya Sovetov Molotov	34	12	9	13	35	39	−4	33	
10	RUS	Avangard Chelyabinsk	34	12	7	15	37	41	−4	31	
11	RUS	Torpedo Stalingrad	34	12	7	15	45	52	−7	31	
12	RUS	Torpedo Rostov-na-Donu	34	11	8	15	59	50	+9	30	
13	UZB	Pahtakor Tashkent (Note: Pahtakor Tashkent was called Spartak.)	34	12	6	16	44	53	−9	30	
14	RUS	Avangard Sverdlovsk	34	10	10	14	40	53	−13	30	
15	KAZ	Kayrat Alma-Ata (Note: Kayrat Alma-Ata was called Urozhai.)	34	9	10	15	41	52	−11	28	
16	KGZ	Spartak Frunze	34	6	8	20	30	75	−45	20	
17	TKM	Kolhozchi Ashkhabad	34	6	6	22	28	75	−47	18	
18	TJK	Kolhozchi Stalinabad	34	1	5	28	22	117	−95	7	

Source: rsssf.com

=== Number of teams by republics ===
Number	Union republics	Team(s)
10	Russian SFSR	FC Krylya Sovetov Kuibyshev, FC Neftyanik Krasnodar, FC Krylya Sovetov Voronezh, FC Torpedo Gorkiy, FC Zenit Izhevsk, FC Krylya Sovetov Molotov, FC Avangard Chelyabinsk, FC Torpedo Stalingrad, FC Torpedo Rostov-na-Donu, FC Avangard Sverdlovsk
1	Georgian SSR	ODO Tbilisi
1	Armenian SSR	FC Spartak Yerevan
1	Azerbaijan SSR	FC Neftyanik Baku
1	Uzbek SSR	FC Pakhtakor Tashkent
1	Kazakh SSR	FC Kairat Alma-Ata
1	Kyrgyz SSR	FC Spartak Frunze
1	Turkmen SSR	FC Kolkhozchi Ashkhabad
1	Tajik SSR	FC Kolkhozchi Stalinabad

== See also ==
- 1956 Soviet Class A
- 1956 Soviet Cup
