= Murtaz Khurtsilava =

Georgian footballer (born 1943)

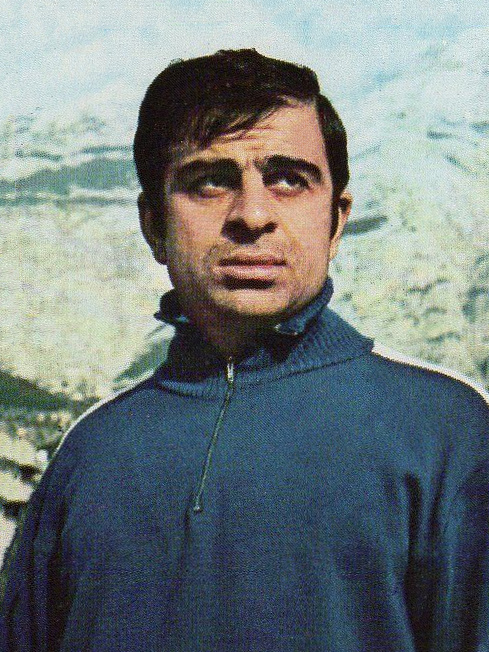
- Khurtsilava in 1973

Personal information
- Full name: Murtaz Kalistratovich Khurtsilava
- Date of birth: 5 January 1943 (age 83)
- Place of birth: Bandza, Martvili District, Georgian SSR, Soviet Union
- Height: 1.75 m (5 ft 9 in)
- Position: Defender

Senior career*
Years	Team	Apps	(Gls)
1961–1975	Dinamo Tbilisi	293	(15)
1975–1976	Torpedo Kutaisi	47	(4)
Total		340	(19)

International career
1965–1973	USSR	69	(6)

Managerial career
- Lokomotiv Samtredia
- 1977: Dinamo Zugdidi
- 1982: Guria Lanchkhuti
- 1987–1989: Dinamo Tbilisi (assistant)
- 1997–1999: Dinamo Tbilisi
- 1999: Lokomotivi Tbilisi
- 1999–2001: Georgia U21
- 2001–2003: Georgia (assistant)
Medal record
Representing Soviet Union
UEFA European Championship
Runner-up	1972 Belgium
Olympic Games
Bronze medal – third place	1972 Munich	Team
- * Club domestic league appearances and goals

Murtaz Kalistratovich Khurtsilava (Georgian: მურთაზ ხურცილავა, Russian: Муртаз Калистратович Хурцилава, born 5 January 1943) is a Georgian former footballer who played as a defender.

Khurtsilava was discovered while playing football in the school garden in Gegechkori, a small town in Caucasus – now known as Martvili – where he learned to play football with a ball made of hay and rags.

He was part of the USSR side that finished fourth at the 1966 FIFA World Cup, third at the 1972 Summer Olympics and second in the 1972 UEFA European Championship. After the UEFA Euro 1972 along with his teammates by Soviet Union national team — Revaz Dzodzuashvili and Evgeni Rudakov — he was included in the team of the tournament, where also were presented such great players like Franz Beckenbauer, Gerd Müller, Paul Breitner, Uli Hoeness and Günter Netzer. He was also one of the only two Georgians, alongside Alexandre Chivadze, to have captained the Soviet Union national team. At the club level he played for Dinamo Tbilisi.

After retiring in 1977, Khurtsilava set up his own business in Tbilisi, where he now resides with his family.

In November 2003, to celebrate UEFA's Jubilee, he was selected as the Golden Player of Georgia by the Georgian Football Federation as their most outstanding player of the past 50 years.

== Honours ==
Dinamo Tbilisi

- Soviet Top League: 1964

Soviet Union

- Olympic Games bronze medal: 1972
- UEFA European Championship runner-up: 1972

Individual

- The best 33 football players of the Soviet Union (10): No. 1 (1968, 1969), (1971–1973); No. 2 (1965, 1966); No. 3 (1963, 1970); N/A (1967)
- Soviet Footballer of the Year: Second Place: 1967, 1968; Third Place: 1972.
- UEFA European Championship Team of the Tournament: 1972
