= Mikhail Golubev =

Ukrainian chess grandmaster and writer (born 1970)

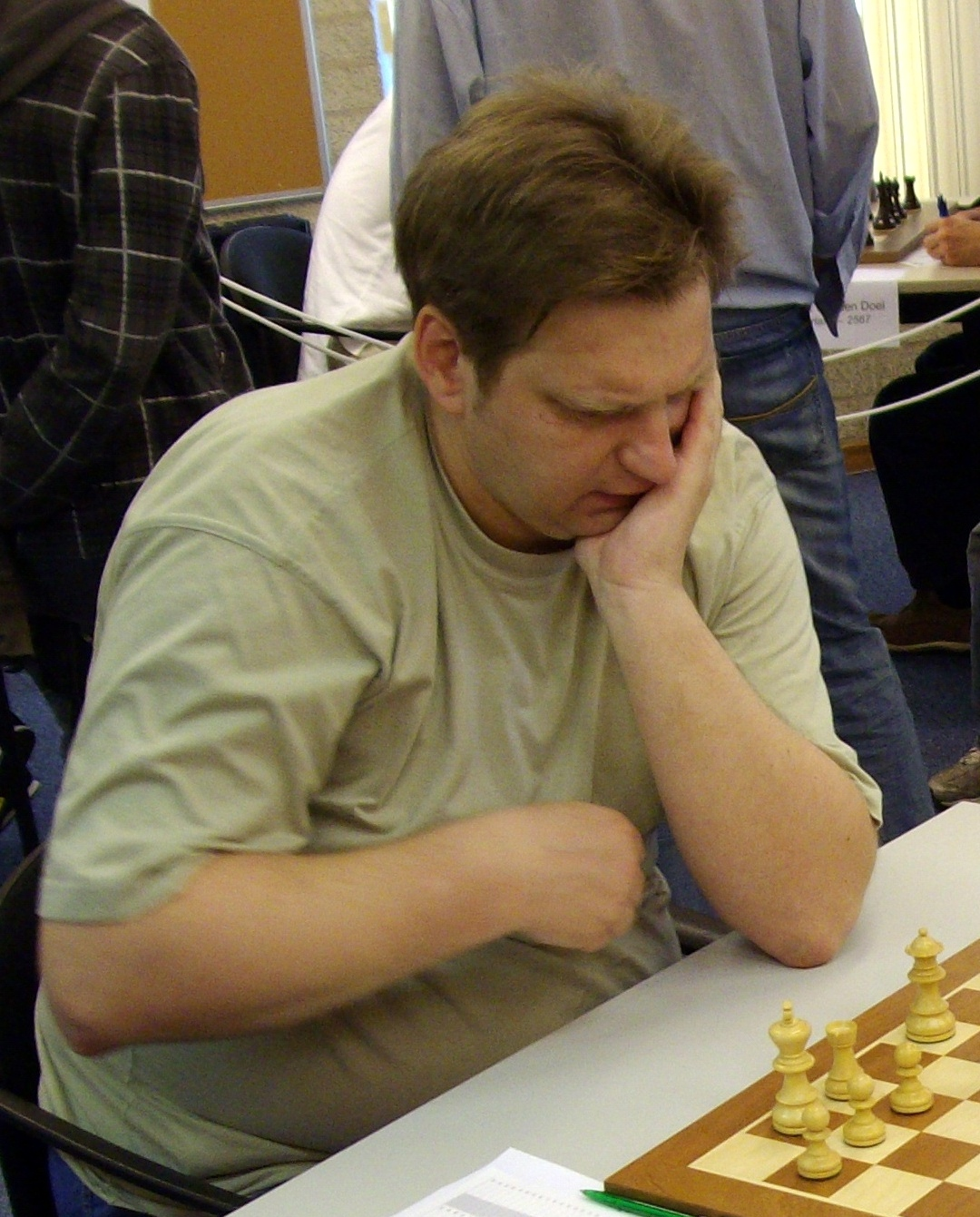
- Golubev in 2008

Personal information
- Born: 30 May 1970 (age 56) Odesa, Ukrainian SSR, Soviet Union

Chess career
- Country: Ukraine
- Title: Grandmaster (1996)
- FIDE rating: 2461 (July 2026)
- Peak rating: 2570 (January 1995)

Mikhail Vladimirovich Golubev (Russian: Михаил Владимирович Голубев; Mykhailo Volodymyrovych Holubev from Ukrainian: Михайло Володимирович Голубев; born 30 May 1970) is a Ukrainian chess Grandmaster (1996), journalist and author.

== Chess career ==
Golubev began playing chess at the age of six and played his first tournament a year later in 1977. He played several times in Ukrainian Chess Championship, and shared first place (with Valery Neverov) at Yalta 1996 (declared winner on better tie-breaks). In 2008, he won the Odesa Oblast Open Championship.

Other successful performances include first place at Karviná 1992–93, first at Bucharest 2002, and first at Béthune 2002. In recent years, Golubev has cut down on his tournament appearances to focus on chess writing and coaching.

== Chess strength ==
According to the website Chessmetrics, at his peak in January 1995, Golubev's play was equivalent to a rating of 2598 and he was ranked number 151 in the world.

According to the database Mega Database 2009, his best performances were Bethune 2002 (6.5/7 with a 2768 performance rating), Karvina 1992–93 (8/9 with a 2691 performance rating), Yalta 1996 (8.5/11 with a 2663 performance rating) and Berlin 1993 (7/9 with a 2662 performance rating). Another of his best performances was at the Biel Open in 1995, where he scored 4/6 against an average of 2605-rated opposition, for a performance of 2643.

Since the July 2019 FIDE list (when he retired), he has had an Elo rating of 2461, which would make him Ukraine's number 77 as of January 2025 were he still active.

== Notable games ==
- Vlatko Bogdanovski vs Mikhail Golubev, Skopje 1991, King's Indian Defense: Orthodox Variation (A46), 0-1
- Mikhail Golubev vs Renzo Mantovani, Biel Open 1992, Sicilian Defense: Fischer-Sozin Attack (B87), 1-0
- Mikhail Golubev vs Emil Sutovsky, Groningen GM open 1993, Sicilian Defense: Exchange Variation (B45), 1-0
- Mikhail Golubev vs Vladimir Podinic, Lasker Autumn GM 2001, Sicilian Defense: Paulsen (B48), 1-0

== Photos ==
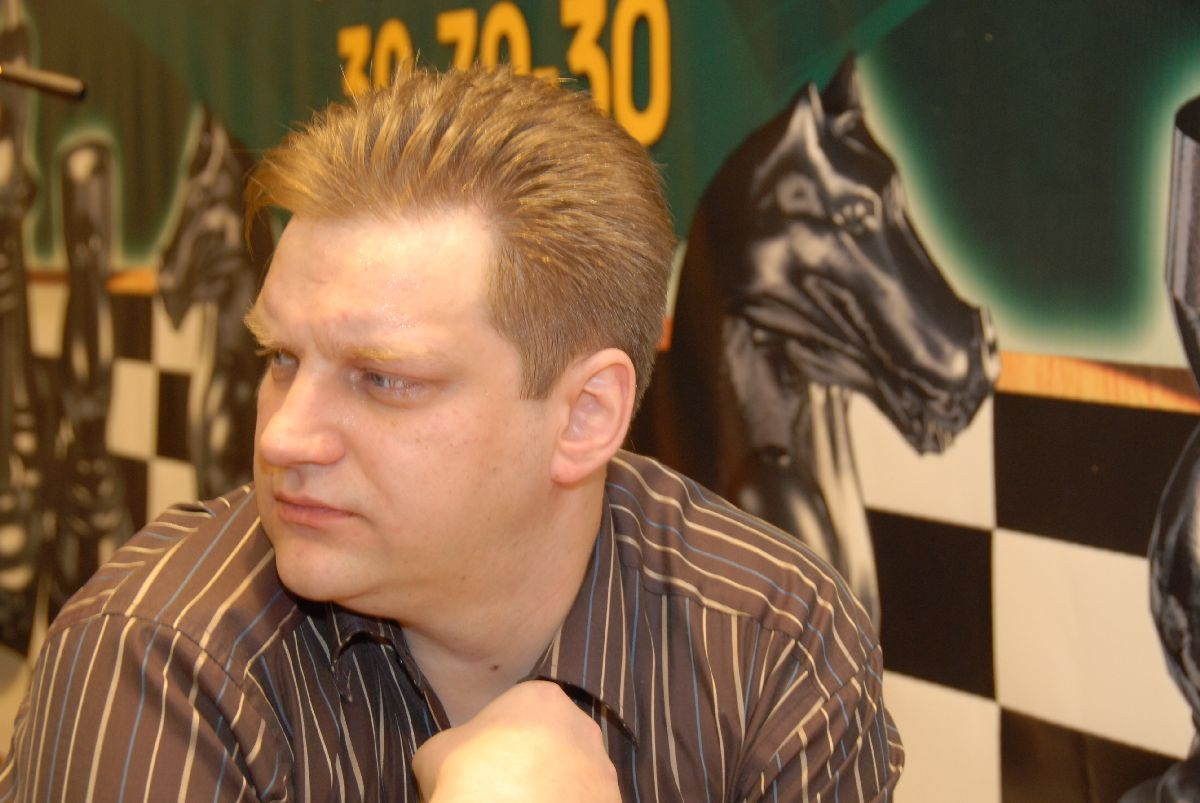

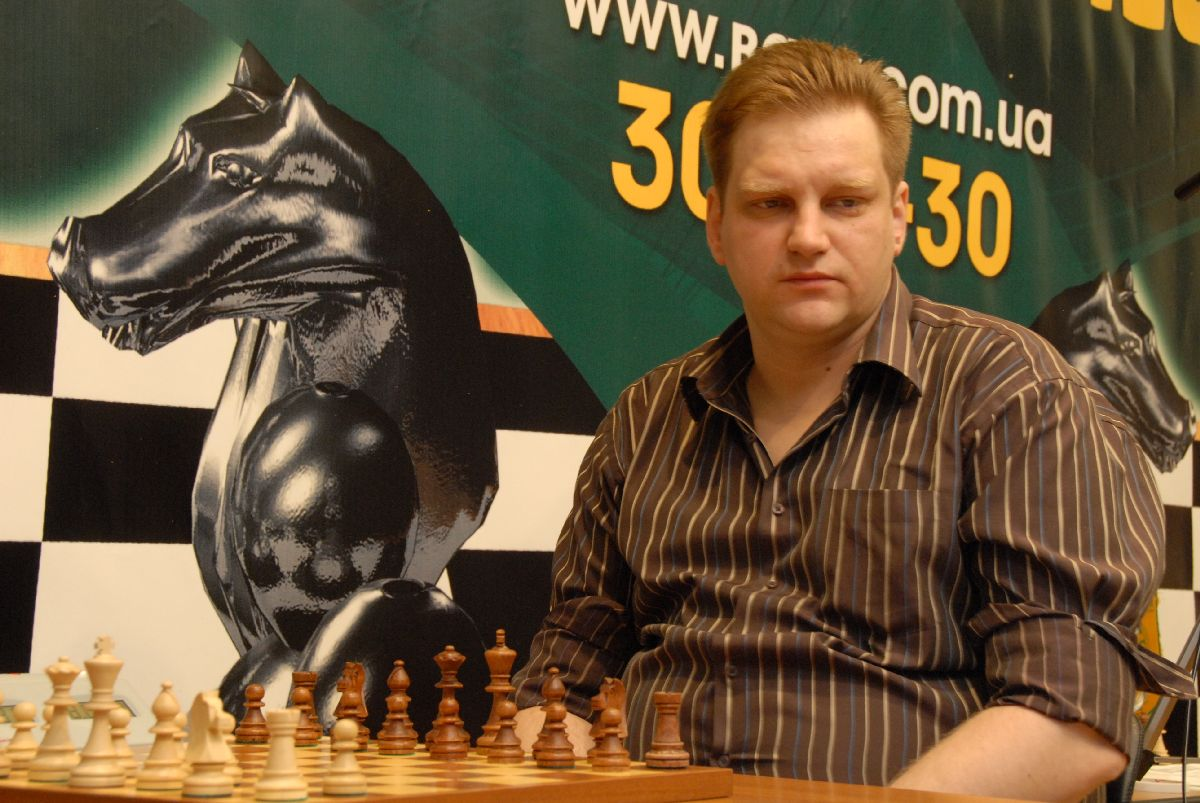

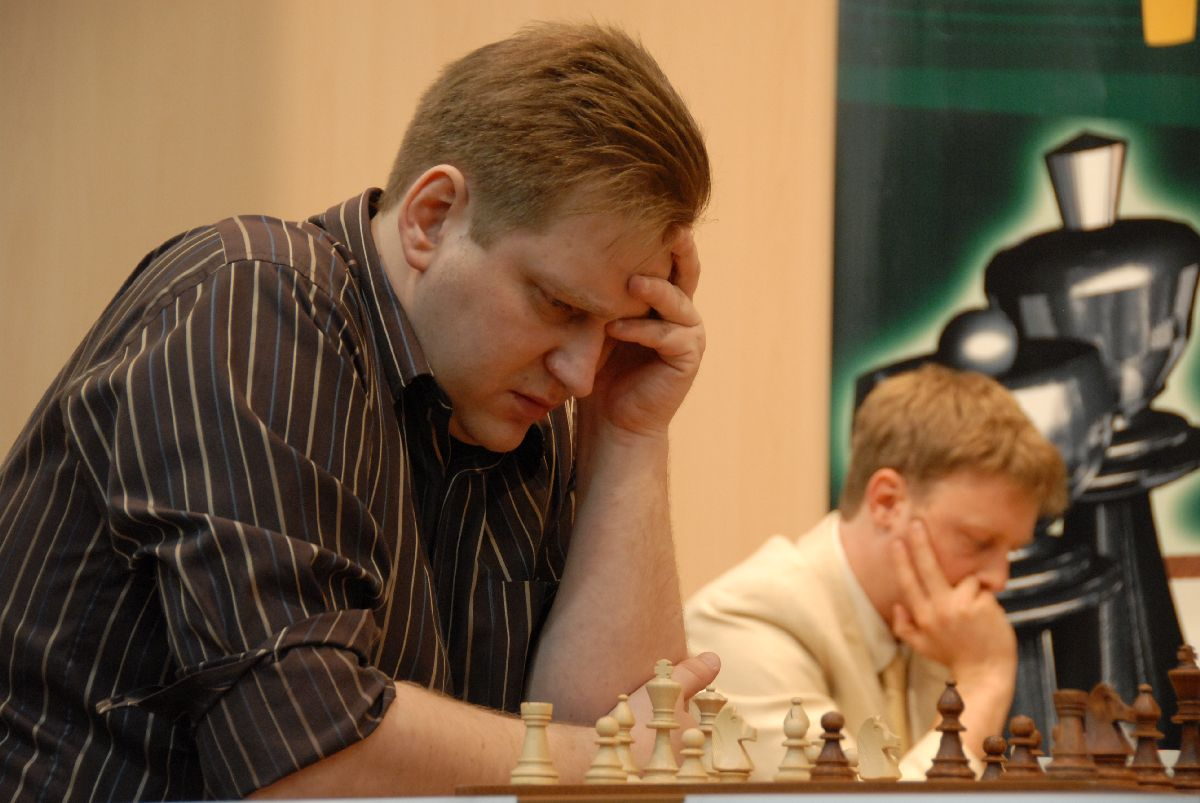

== Books ==
- Golubev, Mikhail (1999). Easy Guide to the Dragon. Everyman Chess. ISBN 978-1857442755.
- Golubev, Mikhail (2001). The Sicilian Sozin. Gambit Publications. ISBN 978-1901983388.
- Golubev, Mikhail (2006). Understanding the King's Indian. Gambit Publications. ISBN 1-904600-31-X.
- Golubev, Mikhail (2017). Understanding the Sicilian. Gambit Publications. ISBN 978-1911465102.

== Journalism ==
Golubev is as much a chess journalist as an author. In addition to being chess observer for the Ukrainian newspaper Komanda and making contributions to ChessBase.com, Chesspro and Chess-News.ru, he has contributed to over 1000 editions of the online daily chess newspaper Chess Today.
