= Soviet Footballer of the Year =

Football award in the Soviet Union

The award Soviet Footballer of the Year was awarded to the best footballer of the Soviet Union from 1964 until 1991. The poll was conducted among journalists by the weekly sports newspaper Football (Football-Hockey). Each journalist named his own top three players every year. Each place carried a point weight such as 1st place was worth 3 pts., 2nd - 2, and 3rd - 1.

The idea for the award appeared right after Lev Yashin had received the Ballon d'Or award in 1963. The honours were awarded along with several other prizes and awards at the end of the competition season. For goalkeepers, not limited to the Soviet Footballer of the Year, also were awarded separate honours, the "Best Goalkeeper of the Year". The best goal-scorer of the Soviet Top League was awarded with the "Best Topscorer of the Year". Before becoming an official award in 1964, in the 1950s Moskovskij Komsomolets and Komsomolskaya Pravda were conducting their own polls to honour the best footballer of the country.

== List of winners ==
Year	Place	Player	Club	Points	Notes
1964	1st	Valery Voronin	Torpedo Moscow	186	
1964	2nd	Valentin Ivanov	Torpedo Moscow	85	
1964	3rd	Slava Metreveli	Dinamo Tbilisi	80	
1965	1st	Valery Voronin	Torpedo Moscow	?	Only the winners were announced; it was later established that Streltsov finished 2nd.
1965	2nd	Eduard Streltsov	Torpedo Moscow	?	Only the winners were announced; it was later established that Streltsov finished 2nd.
1966	1st	Andriy Biba	Dynamo Kyiv	94	Yashin and Shesternev obtained an equal number points, but Yashin was ranked higher for having more 1st place votes.
1966	2nd	Lev Yashin	Dynamo Moscow	75	Yashin and Shesternev obtained an equal number points, but Yashin was ranked higher for having more 1st place votes.
1966	3rd	Albert Shesternev	CSKA Moscow	75	Yashin and Shesternev obtained an equal number points, but Yashin was ranked higher for having more 1st place votes.
1967	1st	Eduard Streltsov	Torpedo Moscow	155	
1967	2nd	Murtaz Khurtsilava	Dinamo Tbilisi	84	
1967	3rd	Anatoliy Byshovets	Dynamo Kyiv	31	
1968	1st	Eduard Streltsov	Torpedo Moscow	206	
1968	2nd	Murtaz Khurtsilava	Dinamo Tbilisi	107	
1968	3rd	Albert Shesternev	CSKA Moscow	41	
1969	1st	Vladimir Muntyan	Dynamo Kyiv	223	
1969	2nd	Anzor Kavazashvili	Spartak Moscow	170	
1969	3rd	Albert Shesternev	CSKA Moscow	76	
1970	1st	Albert Shesternyov	CSKA Moscow	298	
1970	2nd	Vladimir Fedotov	CSKA Moscow	159	
1970	3rd	Viktor Bannikov	Dynamo Kyiv	73	
1971	1st	Evhen Rudakov	Dynamo Kyiv	298	
1971	2nd	Viktor Kolotov	Dynamo Kyiv	200	
1971	3rd	Eduard Markarov	Ararat Yerevan	61	
1972	1st	Yevgeny Lovchev	Spartak Moscow	188	
1972	2nd	Evhen Rudakov	Dynamo Kyiv	156	
1972	3rd	Murtaz Khurtsilava	Dinamo Tbilisi	140	
1973	1st	Oleg Blokhin	Dynamo Kyiv	207	
1973	2nd	Arkady Andriasyan	Ararat Yerevan	156	
1973	3rd	Vladimir Pilguy	Dynamo Moscow	82	
1974	1st	Oleg Blokhin	Dynamo Kyiv	236	
1974	2nd	Vladimir Veremeev	Dynamo Kyiv	62	
1974	3rd	Aleksandr Prokhorov	Spartak Moscow	60	
1975	1st	Oleg Blokhin	Dynamo Kyiv	362	
1975	2nd	Vladimir Veremeev	Dynamo Kyiv	108	
1975	3rd	Yevgeni Lovchev	Spartak Moscow	99	
1976	1st	Vladimir Astapovskiy	CSKA Moscow	256	
1976	2nd	David Kipiani	Dinamo Tbilisi	136	
1976	3rd	Oleg Blokhin	Dynamo Kyiv	116	
1977	1st	David Kipiani	Dinamo Tbilisi	323	
1977	2nd	Oleg Blokhin	Dynamo Kyiv	198	
1977	3rd	Yuriy Dehteryov	Shakhter Donetsk	171	
1978	1st	Ramaz Shengelia	Dinamo Tbilisi	235	
1978	2nd	Oleg Blokhin	Dynamo Kyiv	156	
1978	3rd	Georgi Yartsev	Spartak Moscow	135	
1979	1st	Vitali Starukhin	Shakhter Donetsk	248	
1979	2nd	Vagiz Khidiyatullin	Spartak Moscow	175	
1979	3rd	Yuri Gavrilov	Spartak Moscow	172	
1980	1st	Aleksandr Chivadze	Dinamo Tbilisi	259	
1980	2nd	Oleg Blokhin	Dynamo Kyiv	187	
1980	3rd	Vagiz Khidiyatullin	Spartak Moscow	103	
1981	1st	Ramaz Shengelia	Dinamo Tbilisi	360	
1981	2nd	Oleg Blokhin	Dynamo Kyiv	217	
1981	3rd	Leonid Buryak	Dynamo Kyiv	112	
1982	1st	Rinat Dasaev	Spartak Moscow	400	
1982	2nd	Anatoliy Demyanenko	Dynamo Kyiv	120	
1982	3rd	Andrei Yakubik	Pakhtakor Tashkent	117	
1983	1st	Fyodor Cherenkov	Spartak Moscow	442	
1983	2nd	Rinat Dasaev	Spartak Moscow	181	
1983	3rd	Aleksandr Chivadze	Dinamo Tbilisi	91	
1984	1st	Hennadiy Litovchenko	Dnipro Dnipropetrovsk	397	
1984	2nd	Mikhail Biryukov	FC Zenit Leningrad	222	
1984	3rd	Yuri Gavrilov	Spartak Moscow	75	
1985	1st	Anatoliy Demyanenko	Dynamo Kyiv	409	
1985	2nd	Oleg Protasov	Dnipro Dnipropetrovsk	393	
1985	3rd	Fyodor Cherenkov	Spartak Moscow	306	
1986	1st	Aleksandr Zavarov	Dynamo Kyiv	357	In 1986 Igor Belanov won the Ballon d'Or but could not become the best player in the Soviet Union.
1986	2nd	Igor Belanov	Dynamo Kyiv	313	In 1986 Igor Belanov won the Ballon d'Or but could not become the best player in the Soviet Union.
1986	3rd	Oleg Blokhin	Dynamo Kyiv	81	In 1986 Igor Belanov won the Ballon d'Or but could not become the best player in the Soviet Union.
1987	1st	Oleg Protasov	Dnipro Dnipropetrovsk	256	
1987	2nd	Alexei Mikhailichenko	Dynamo Kyiv	144	
1987	3rd	Rinat Dasaev	Spartak Moscow	120	
1988	1st	Alexei Mikhailichenko	Dynamo Kyiv	482	
1988	2nd	Rinat Dasaev	Spartak Moscow	109	
1988	3rd	Fyodor Cherenkov	Spartak Moscow	81	
1989	1st	Fyodor Cherenkov	Spartak Moscow	345	
1989	2nd	Stanislav Cherchesov	Spartak Moscow	172	
1989	3rd	Vladimir Bessonov	Dynamo Kyiv	164	
1990	1st	Igor Dobrovolski	Dynamo Moscow	259	
1990	2nd	Sergei Yuran	Dynamo Kyiv	115	
1990	3rd	Aleksandr Mostovoi	Spartak Moscow	68	
1991	1st	Igor Kolyvanov	Dynamo Moscow	229	
1991	2nd	Aleksandr Mostovoi	Spartak Moscow	153	
1991	3rd	Igor Korneev	CSKA Moscow	148	

== Most wins by club ==
Club	Winners	Winning years
Dynamo Kyiv	9	1966, 1969, 1971, 1973, 1974, 1975, 1985, 1986, 1988
Dynamo Tbilisi	4	1977, 1978, 1980, 1981
Spartak Moscow	4	1972, 1982, 1983, 1989
Torpedo Moscow	4	1964, 1965, 1967, 1968
CSKA Moscow	2	1970, 1976
Dnipro Dnipropetrovsk	2	1984, 1987
FC Dynamo Moscow	2	1990, 1991
Shakhter Donetsk	1	1979

== Most wins by player ==
Name	Wins	Winning years
Oleg Blokhin	3	1973, 1974, 1975
Fyodor Cherenkov	2	1983, 1989
Ramaz Shengelia	2	1978, 1981
Eduard Streltsov	2	1967, 1968
Valery Voronin	2	1964, 1965

== See also ==
After the Soviet Union dissolved most of the new independent countries created their own awards to the best footballer of the year. A few countries including Ukraine, Belarus and Lithuania had been awarding their own awards even before the collapse of Soviet Union.

- Armenian Footballer of the Year
- Azerbaijani Footballer of the Year
- Belarusian Footballer of the Year
- Estonian Footballer of the Year
- Georgian Footballer of the Year
- Kazakhstani Footballer of the Year
- Latvian Footballer of the Year
- Lithuanian Footballer of the Year
- Moldovan Footballer of the Year
- Footballer of the Year in Russia (Futbol)
- Footballer of the Year in Russia (Sport-Express)
- Ukrainian Footballer of the Year
- Uzbekistan Footballer of the Year
- Footballer of the Year in Baltic and Commonwealth of Independent States
