= The best 33 football players of Ukraine =

Annual list by Komanda newspaper

The best 33 football players of Ukraine (33 найкращі футболісти України) is an annual list of the three best football players in each position for the past calendar year composed by the Ukrainian newspaper Komanda.

== Overview ==
It is an unofficial rating and is being conducted through the adaptation of a previous official annual Soviet award endorsed by the Football Federation of Soviet Union that was discontinued after the fall of the Soviet Union. The newspaper conducts the rating since 1998 for the Ukrainian national players participating in the Ukrainian Premier League.

A similar award recently was adopted by one of the leading Ukrainian football news websites "UA-Football" in 2006. In its section "the best out of the best" the website conducts various polls of its readers concerning the Ukrainian football for the past calendar year and usually publishing their results in its January editions. Among its well established ratings are the combined symbolic team, the best coach, the best legionnaire (foreign player), and many others.

== 33 best winners ==
2007 by Komanda

Position	Place	Player (club)
GK	1. 2. 3.	Vyacheslav Kernozenko (Dnipro); Oleksandr Shovkovskyi (Dynamo); Andriy Pyatov (Vorskla/Shakhtar)
RD	1. 2. 3.	Volodymyr Yezerskiy (Dnipro/Shakhtar); Oleksiy Gai (Shakhtar); Hryhoriy Yarmash (Vorskla)
CD	1. 2. 3.	Andriy Rusol (Dnipro); Dmytro Chyhrynskyi (Shakhtar); Bohdan Shershun (Dnipro)
CD	1. 2. 3.	Oleksandr Hrytsai (Dnipro); Oleksandr Kucher (Shakhtar); Andriy Berezovchuk (Kharkiv)
LD	1. 2. 3.	Andriy Nesmachniy (Dynamo); Oleksandr Romanchuk (Dnipro/Arsenal); Maksym Pashayev (Dnipro/Kryvbas)
RM	1. 2. 3.	Oleh Husev (Dynamo); Serhiy Serebrennykov (Cercle); Ihor Khudobyak (Karpaty)
DM	1. 2. 3.	Anatoliy Tymoschuk (Zenit); Oleh Shelaev (Dnipro); Taras Mykhalyk (Dynamo)
AM	1. 2. 3.	Serhiy Nazarenko (Dnipro); Oleksandr Rykun (Metalist); Serhiy Kravchenko (Vorskla)
LM	1. 2. 3.	Maksym Kalynychenko (Spartak); Serhiy Pylypchuk (Spartak Nch); Dmytro Lepa (Dnipro)
FW	1. 2. 3.	Andriy Voronin (Bayer/Liverpool); Andriy Vorobei (Shakhtar/Dnipro); Volodymyr Homeniuk (Tavria)
FW	1. 2. 3.	Andriy Shevchenko (Chelsea); Oleksandr Hladkiy (Kharkiv/Shakhtar); Ruslan Fomin (Shakhtar/Metalist)
