= Oleksandr Zinchenko =

Oleksandr Zinchenko may refer to:

- Oleksandr Zinchenko (politician) (1957–2010), Ukrainian politician
- Oleksandr Zinchenko (footballer) (born 1996), Ukrainian footballer
