= Yuriy Kalitvintsev =

Ukrainian football player and manager

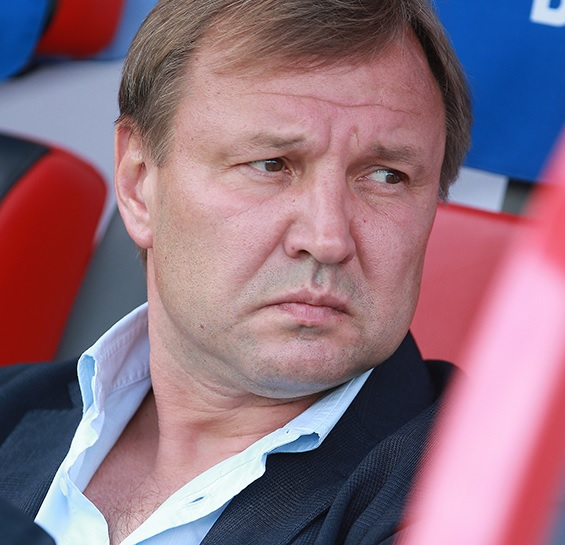
- Kalitvintsev as Dynamo Moscow manager in 2016

Personal information
- Full name: Yuriy Mykolayovych Kalitvintsev
- Date of birth: 5 May 1968 (age 58)
- Place of birth: Volgograd, Soviet Union
- Height: 1.81 m (5 ft 11 in)
- Position: Midfielder

Senior career*
Years	Team	Apps	(Gls)
1985–1986	Rotor Volgograd	9	(0)
1986–1988	SKA Rostov-on-Don	60	(6)
1988–1991	Rotor Volgograd	117	(27)
1992–1994	Dynamo Moscow	48	(8)
1993–1994	→ Dynamo-d Moscow	4	(3)
1994	Lokomotiv Nizhny Novgorod	18	(8)
1994–1998	Dynamo Kyiv	93	(15)
1997–1998	→ Dynamo-2 Kyiv	11	(2)
1998	→ Dynamo-3 Kyiv	1	(0)
1999	Trabzonspor	14	(1)
1999–2000	CSKA Kyiv	10	(1)
Total		385	(71)

International career
1995–1999	Ukraine	22	(1)

Managerial career
- 2001–2002: Zakarpattia Uzhhorod
- 2002–2005: Ukraine U19
- 2005–2006: Ukraine U17
- 2006–2009: Dynamo-2 Kyiv
- 2009: Ukraine U19
- 2009–2010: Dynamo-2 Kyiv
- 2010–2012: Ukraine (assistant)
- 2010–2011: Ukraine (caretaker)
- 2013–2014: Volga Nizhny Novgorod
- 2016–2017: Dynamo Moscow
- 2021: Olimpik Donetsk
- 2021–2024: Polissya Zhytomyr
- * Club domestic league appearances and goals

Yuriy Mykolayovych Kalitvintsev (Ukrainian: Юрій Миколайович Калитвинцев, Russian: Ю́рий Никола́евич Калитвинцев; born 5 May 1968) is a football manager and former player.

Born in Russia, Kalitvintsev became a naturalized Ukrainian after a spell with Dynamo Kyiv and represented the Ukraine national team.

Kalitvintsev coached Ukraine U-19 to victory during the 2009 UEFA European Under-19 Football Championship.

His son Vladyslav is also a player, a midfielder for Desna Chernihiv.

== Club career ==
A Russian-born Kalitvintsev chose to play for the Ukraine side after breaking through as a midfielder for Dynamo Kyiv. Until 1994 he played he spent his playing career at Russian clubs such as Rotor Volgograd, SKA Rostov-on-Don, Dynamo Moscow, and Lokomotiv Nizhny Novgorod. It wasn't until the reorganization of the soviet football when he started to play at the top level of the Russian championship starting for the Moscow's Dynamo. After being transferred to the fading club of Nizhniy Novgorod soon he was offered opportunity from the Ukrainian football giant, Dynamo, which he did not refuse playing alongside such players as Andriy Shevchenko, Serhii Rebrov, Vitaliy Kosovskyi, and others. His playmaking abilities during the late 1990s were particularly useful during his partnership with Serhii Rebrov and Andriy Shevchenko on both the club and national team level where he earned an honorary position of a team captain. Kalitvintsev was named Ukrainian Footballer of the Year in 1995. In 1998, Kalitvintsev earned a paid transfer to play for Trabzonspor in Turkey, returning to play for CSKA Kyiv to finish his playing career in 2000.

== International career ==
Kalitvintsev earned 22 caps for the Ukraine national team. He scored one goal, a very important one against the group favorites, Croatia, at Republican Stadium in Kyiv on 11 June 1995 during qualification to the Euro 1996.

== Coaching career ==
Following his retirement, Kalitvintsev coached Zakarpattia Uzhhorod for several years. He was the coach of FC Dynamo-2 Kyiv in 2006–10. In January 2013 Kalitvintsev was appointed the head coach of FC Volga Nizhny Novgorod returning to Nizhniy Novgorod after almost 20 years when he played for Lokomotiv Nizhniy Novgorod.

Kalitvintsev was a coach of several junior Ukraine national football teams that played in tournaments for U-19 and U-17 players. Kalitvintsev was appointed as assistant of head coach Myron Markevych of Ukraine's national football team early February 2010. After Markevych's resignation of late August 2010 Kalitvintsev was appointed Ukraine's caretaker manager on 25 August 2010. On 21 April 2011, Oleh Blokhin was appointed head coach of the Ukraine national team; Kalitvintsev stayed on as Blokhin's assistant.

In June 2016, Kalitvintsev was appointed manager of Russian First League team Dynamo Moscow and let them to promotion back to the Russian Premier League.

== Career statistics ==
=== International goals ===
Scores and results list Ukraine's goal tally first, score column indicates score after each Kalitvintsev goal.

List of international goals scored by Yuriy Kalitvintsev
No.	Date	Venue	Opponent	Score	Result	Competition
1	11 June 1995	Republican Stadium, Kyiv, Ukraine	Croatia	1–0	1–0	UEFA Euro 1996 qualifying

== Honours ==
=== As Player ===
Dynamo Kyiv

- Ukrainian Premier League: 1994–95, 1995–96, 1996–97, 1997–98
- Ukrainian Cup: 1995–96, 1997–98
- Commonwealth of Independent States Cup: 1997, 1998

Rotor Volgograd

- Soviet/Russian First League: 1991

Individual

- Ukrainian Premier League Footballer of the Year: 1995

=== As Coach ===
Polissya Zhytomyr

- Ukrainian First League (II tier): 2022–23

Dynamo Moscow

- Russian Football National League (II tier): 2016–17

Ukraine U19

- UEFA European Under-19 Championship: 2009

Individual

- Ukrainian Premier League Coach of the Month: October 2023
