= The best 33 football players of the Soviet Union =

Football award list in the Soviet Union

The List of 33 Best Football Players of the Year (Список 33 лучших футболистов сезона в СССР) was an annual award list of the former Soviet Union which ran from 1948 to 1991. It was compiled after each football season by the Presidium of the USSR Football Federation, following the proposal of the National Coaches' Council, which approved the list of the 33 best football players. The award was not related to the independent Soviet Footballer of the Year award which ran from 1964 until 1991 on a poll conducted among journalists, rather than among coaches.

== After 1991 ==
Following the dissolution of the USSR in 1991, the Russian Football Federation instituted a similar list in 1992 for the Russian league (ru:Список 33 лучших футболистов чемпионата России). The Russian Football Federation announces the list annually, once the Russian Premier League has concluded.

The Ukrainian newspaper Komanda also instituted a similar list for List of 33 Best Football Players of the Year in Ukraine.
