= Allgemeiner Deutscher Nachrichtendienst =

State news agency in East Germany

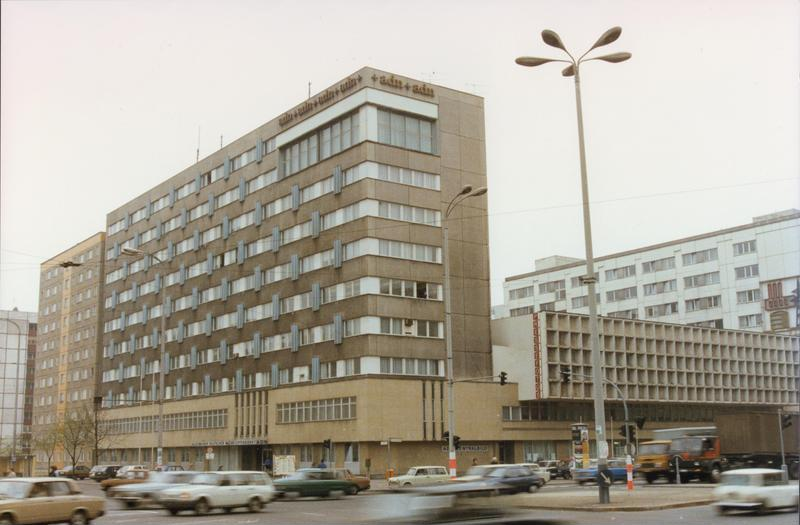
- ADN headquarters in 1990
- Type: News agency
- Founded: October 1946
- Defunct: May 1992
- Fate: Taken over by Deutscher Depeschendienst
- Successor: Deutscher Depeschendienst
- Headquarters: East Berlin, East Germany
- Key people: Günter Pötschke (General Director; 1977–1989); Rolf Schablinski (Deputy General Director; 1978–1990)
- Owner: Council of Ministers of East Germany
- Number of employees: 1.400 (1989)
- Parent: Council of Ministers of East Germany (de jure); Agitation Department of the Central Committee of the SED (de facto)
- Subsidiaries: ADN-Zentralbild

The Allgemeiner Deutscher Nachrichtendienst (ADN; lit. 'General German News Service') was the state news agency of the German Democratic Republic (GDR). It had a state monopoly on the production of news and news media, and supplied news content to newspapers and news broadcasters.

== History ==
The ADN was established in October 1946 as a GmbH (limited liability company) with the support of the Soviet Military Administration in Germany. In 1953, the GDR's ruling Socialist Unity Party (SED) ordered ADN GmbH dissolved and converted into a government agency with a monopoly on national and international news coverage. Although the ADN was officially subordinate to the Council of Ministers, the SED maintained a careful watch over it as the most important means of disseminating news to the public. In 1956, ADN assumed control over formerly independent photographic agencies in Berlin under the name ADN Zentralbild (ADN-ZB – German: Central Picture).

According to the ADN statute of 1966, its task was to report news in light of the ruling party's program, resolutions of the party's Central Committee and regulations issued by the GDR Council of State and Council of Ministers. Until the end of the 1970s, ADN compiled and distributed news via teleprinters. The ADN began converting to electronic text processing and transmission in 1979, using technology purchased from the Kyoto-based Omron Corporation.

Up to 1989, ADN employed approximately 1,400 people. It did not survive for long after German reunification in 1990. In May 1992, reduced to a staff of 254 and unable to compete with West German news services, the firm was sold to the Deutsche Depeschendienst (German Telegraphic Service). The collection of approximately one million historical photos preserved by ADN Zentralbild, some dating back to the earliest years of photography, were acquired by the German Federal Archives in Koblenz.

== Coverage ==
The ADN exercised a monopoly over the wire-service business in the GDR, supplying news dispatches, reports, articles and photographs to nearly all newspapers and radio and television broadcasters in the GDR. While newspapers and other periodicals also maintained their own staffs of reporters and editors, ADN set the overall standards for media in the GDR.

Coverage was divided into two categories, Inland (domestic) and Ausland (foreign). Ausland coverage included the political and economic situations in other countries, including the Federal Republic of Germany. All other areas, including politics, the economy. culture, education, science and sports, were considered Inland. There was a separate reporting service for news related to the Council for Mutual Economic Assistance, the economic community of socialist states.

ADN maintained domestic bureaus in each of the GDR's fifteen governmental districts, or Bezirke, including East Berlin, as well as a network of foreign offices in socialist and capitalist states. The ADN's foreign correspondents not only covered international news but also supplied the GDR government with confidential reports and news analysis from the countries to which they were assigned.
