= Komanda (newspaper) =

Ukrainian sport newspaper

- Type: Daily
- Format: Broadsheet
- Owner: ZAO Komanda
- Publisher: ZAO Komanda
- Editor-in-chief: Yuriy Karman
- Staff writers: Oleksandr Tymchyna (director)
- Founded: 1995
- Ceased publication: 2016
- Language: Russian (primary)
- Headquarters: 17 Kurenevskiy Lane; Kyiv, 04073; Ukraine
- Website: komanda.com.ua

Komanda was a sport newspaper published daily in Kyiv, Ukraine.

It was founded in 1995, and as of September 2001, it was available online. It offered sport analysis, original interviews, and opinions. It was published in Russian.

Its registration number KBN 2163 of 18 September 1996. The subscription index is 33780. The newspaper was published five times a week, no Sunday or Monday editions. It was part of UMH group. In December 2016, it closed.

== Staff ==
- Director – Oleksandr Tymchyna
- Chief editor – Yuriy Karman
- Manager of Lviv division – Vasyl Mykhailov
- Manager of football news section – Valeriy Novobranets
- Secretary – Serhiy Pylkevych
- Technical editor – Danylo Radovskiy
- Website editor – Serhiy Berov

The paper's motto is "Of what screams and whispers the world of sport" (Russian: О чём кричит и шепчет мир спорта, romanized: O chyom krichit i shepchet mir sporta).

- The paper consists of nine sections: football, autosport, basketball, hockey, tennis, box, chess, other, and behind curtains.
- There are about 30 authors from Ukraine and Europe that contribute to the newspaper, including Grandmaster Mikhail Golubev.
- The paper's website demonstrates the rating among the most interesting articles; taking a variety of different public polls; has a forum to address issues, express an opinion, and/or give a suggestion. The website also provides with an extensive archive database of all previous editions, and it also gives a detail information about subscription.
