= List of FC Spartak Moscow players =

This is a list of notable players for FC Spartak Moscow. It includes the players who made at least 50 league appearances for the club or scored at least 5 league goals.

Figures and dates are for the league competitions only (Soviet Top League, Soviet First League and Russian Premier League). Appearances and goals in the games which were awarded to one team after the fact (or in the unfinished 1941 Soviet Top League) are included.

For a list of all Spartak players with a Wikipedia article, see Category:FC Spartak Moscow players.

== Players ==
As of 30 November 2009 (end of the 2009 season).

Name	Nationality	Position	Spartak career	Appearances	Goals
Nikolay Abramov	Soviet Union	DF	1969–76	137	1
Anatoli Akimov	Soviet Union	GK	1936–37, 1939–41	60	0
Dmitri Alenichev	Russia	MF	1994–98, 2004–06	143	21
Alex	Brazil	MF	2009–2011	29	12
Vyacheslav Ambartsumyan	Soviet Union	MF	1959, 1963–71	165	31
Dimitri Ananko	Russia	DF	1990–94, 1995–2002	150	1
Valeri Andreyev	Soviet Union	FW	1970–76, 1977	97	21
Sergei Artemyev	Soviet Union	MF	1936–40	53	0
Vasili Baranov	Belarus	MF	1998–2003	120	18
Nikita Bazhenov	Russia	FW	2004–2010	92	17
Sergei Bazulev	Soviet Union	DF	1983–84, 1989–91	90	0
Vladimir Beschastnykh	Russia	FW	1991–94, 2001–02	104	56
Artyom Bezrodny	Russia	MF	1995–97, 1998–2003	55	10
Denis Boyarintsev	Russia	MF	2005–07, 2009	91	9
Aleksandr Bubnov	Soviet Union	DF	1983–89	169	3
Vladimir Bukiyevskiy	Soviet Union	DF	1972–79, 1982	199	6
Viktor Bulatov	Russia	MF	1999–2001	87	7
Mikhail Bulgakov	Soviet Union	MF	1970–79	205	39
Yevgeni Bushmanov	Russia	DF	1989–92, 1998–2000	58	2
Maksim Buznikin	Russia	FW	1997–99, 2000	55	18
Vladimir Bystrov	Russia	MF	2005–09	99	17
Fernando Cavenaghi	Argentina	FW	2004–06	51	12
Stanislav Cherchesov	Russia	GK	1984–87, 1989–93, 1995, 2002	149	0
Fyodor Cherenkov	Russia	MF	1977–90, 1991, 1993	398	95
Vladimir Chernyshev	Soviet Union	GK	1946–55	74	0
Viktor Chistyakov	Soviet Union	MF	1957–62	51	3
Boris Chuchelov	Soviet Union	FW	1948	19	11
Serghei Covalciuc	Moldova	MF	2004–09	90	2
Rinat Dasayev	Soviet Union	GK	1977–88	335	0
Nikolay Dementyev	Soviet Union	FW	1946–54	186	55
Valeri Dikaryov	Soviet Union	DF	1961–67	192	1
Vadim Evseev	Russia	DF	1993–98, 1999	62	3
Yuri Falin	Soviet Union	MF	1961–65, 1967	133	34
Malik Fathi	Germany	DF	2008–09	37	6
Aleksandr Filimonov	Russia	GK	1996–2001	147	0
Yuri Gavrilov	Soviet Union	MF	1977–85	280	89
Edgar Gess	Soviet Union	MF	1979–83	114	26
Valeri Gladilin	Soviet Union	MF	1974–78, 1983–84	169	28
Georgi Glazkov	Soviet Union	FW	1936–41, 1946–47	106	48
Sergei Gorlukovich	Russia	DF	1996–98	83	5
Aleksandr Grebnev	Soviet Union	DF	1966–69	54	1
Nikolai Gulyayev	Soviet Union	MF	1937–46	76	7
Anatoli Ilyin	Soviet Union	FW	1949–62	228	84
Anatoli Isayev	Soviet Union	FW	1953–62	159	53
Valentin Ivakin	Soviet Union	GK	1957–62	101	0
Andrei Ivanov	Russia	DF	1983–85, 1988–89, 1990–94, 1995	109	0
Vadim Ivanov	Soviet Union	DF	1969–71	75	2
Martin Jiránek	Czech Republic	DF	2004–2010	126	3
Aleksandr Kalashnikov	Soviet Union	FW	1978–82	67	16
Vasili Kalinov	Soviet Union	MF	1969–72	83	10
Maksym Kalynychenko	Ukraine	MF	2000–08	134	22
Anatoli Kanishchev	Russia	FW	1998, 1999	25	6
Vladimir Kapustin	Soviet Union	MF	1985–89	51	1
Valery Karpin	Russia	MF	1990–94	117	28
Anzor Kavazashvili	Soviet Union	GK	1969–71	74	0
Valery Kechinov	Russia	MF	1993–2000	112	35
Vagiz Khidiyatullin	Soviet Union	DF	1976–80, 1986–88	185	22
Dmitri Khlestov	Russia	DF	1989–2000, 2002	201	6
Serafim Kholodkov	Soviet Union	DF	1941, 1946–49	90	0
Galimzyan Khusainov	Soviet Union	FW	1961–73	346	102
Nikolay Kiselyov	Soviet Union	MF	1968–73, 1975–76	131	16
Aleksandr Kokorev	Soviet Union	MF	1972–80	90	4
Ivan Konov	Soviet Union	FW	1945–48	85	31
Viktor Konovalov	Soviet Union	MF	1960–61	24	5
Alexey Korneyev	Soviet Union	DF	1957–67	177	0
Pavel Kornilov	Soviet Union	FW	1938–41	65	38
Radoslav Kováč	Czech Republic	MF	2005–08	101	9
Yuri Kovtun	Russia	DF	1999–2005	122	7
Wojciech Kowalewski	Poland	GK	2003–07	94	0
Anatoly Krutikov	Soviet Union	DF	1959–69	269	9
Dmitri Kudryashov	Russia	MF	2002	22	5
Vasili Kulkov	Russia	DF	1986, 1989–91, 1995, 1997	93	4
Boris Kuznetsov	Soviet Union	DF	1985–88, 1989–90	90	0
Yevgeni Kuznetsov	Soviet Union	MF	1982–89	209	23
Igor Lediakhov	Russia	MF	1992–94	65	21
Aleksei Leontyev	Soviet Union	GK	1940–49	109	0
Boris Lobutev	Soviet Union	FW	1957–60	15	7
Gennady Logofet	Soviet Union	DF	1960–75	349	27
Evgeny Lovchev	Soviet Union	MF	1969–78	249	30
Konstantin Malinin	Soviet Union	DF	1939–50	140	7
Ramiz Mamedov	Russia	DF	1991–98	125	6
Valeri Masalitin	Russia	FW	1994–95	7	5
Vladimir Maslachenko	Soviet Union	GK	1962–68	196	0
Anatoli Maslyonkin	Soviet Union	DF	1954–63	216	8
Aiden McGeady	Ireland	FW	2010-14	72	11
Aleksei Melyoshin	Russia	MF	1995–2000	68	5
Aleksandr Minayev	Soviet Union	MF	1972–75	92	10
Alexander Mirzoyan	Soviet Union	DF	1979–83	80	9
Vitali Mirzoyev	Soviet Union	FW	1971–74	58	4
Viktor Mishin	Soviet Union	FW	1956–61	43	8
Igor Mitreski	North Macedonia	DF	2001–04	85	0
Gennady Morozov	Soviet Union	DF	1980–86, 1989–90	196	3
Aleksandr Mostovoi	Soviet Union	MF	1986–91	106	34
Mozart	Brazil	MF	2005–08	68	7
Ivan Mozer	Soviet Union	MF	1956–61	96	30
Mukhsin Mukhamadiev	Russia	MF	1994–95	30	13
Igor Netto	Soviet Union	MF	1949–66	368	36
Yuriy Nikiforov	Russia	DF	1993–96	85	16
Vladimir Nikonov	Soviet Union	MF	1979–80, 1982	25	5
Sergei Novikov	Soviet Union	MF	1978–80, 1985–89	70	12
Mikhail Ogonkov	Soviet Union	DF	1953–58, 1961	78	0
Sergei Olshansky	Soviet Union	DF	1969–75	138	7
Viktor Onopko	Russia	DF	1992–95	108	23
Nikolai Osyanin	Soviet Union	DF	1966–71, 1974–76	248	50
Viktor Papayev	Soviet Union	MF	1968–73, 1975–76	174	10
Aleksei Paramonov	Soviet Union	MF	1947–59	264	61
Dmytro Parfenov	Ukraine	DF	1998–2005	125	15
Nikolai Parshin	Soviet Union	FW	1949–58	106	36
Viktor Pasulko	Soviet Union	MF	1987–89	75	16
Aleksandr Pavlenko	Russia	MF	2001–07, 2008–09	110	11
Vadim Pavlenko	Soviet Union	FW	1977–78	47	16
Roman Pavlyuchenko	Russia	FW	2003–08	141	69
Hennadiy Perepadenko	Ukraine	MF	1990–91, 1992	51	6
Boris Petrov	Soviet Union	FW	1962	18	5
Vladimir Petrov	Soviet Union	DF	1959–71	174	5
Andrei Piatnitski	Russia	MF	1992–97	100	17
Nikolai Pisarev	Russia	FW	1992–95, 1998, 2000–01	115	32
Aleksandr Piskaryov	Soviet Union	FW	1971–75	117	33
Mihajlo Pjanović	Serbia	FW	2003–06	48	11
Stipe Pletikosa	Croatia	GK	2007–2010	63	0
Dmitri Popov	Russia	DF	1989–93	78	7
Boris Pozdnyakov	Soviet Union	DF	1978–84, 1989–91	145	3
Vladimir Pribylov	Soviet Union	FW	1964–69	35	6
Aleksandr Prokhorov	Soviet Union	GK	1972–75, 1976–78	143	0
Andrei Protasov	Soviet Union	FW	1939–41	32	10
Dmitri Radchenko	Russia	FW	1991–93	61	27
Vladimir Redin	Soviet Union	MF	1970–74, 1976	90	12
Valery Reinhold	Soviet Union	FW	1960–67	176	32
Luis Robson	Brazil	FW	1997–2001	102	32
Sergey Rodionov	Russia	FW	1979–90, 1993–95	303	124
Clemente Rodríguez	Argentina	DF	2004–06, 2008–09	71	3
Oleg Romantsev	Soviet Union	DF	1976–83	180	6
Miroslav Romaschenko	Belarus	MF	1997–98	42	7
Sergei Rozhkov	Soviet Union	MF	1961–65, 1967–69, 1974	143	8
Andrei Rudakov	Soviet Union	FW	1985–87	49	17
Leonid Rumyantsev	Soviet Union	FW	1936–40	26	8
Mikhail Rusyayev	Russia	FW	1981–87, 1992	47	9
Konstantin Ryazantsev	Soviet Union	MF	1941, 1944–51	114	5
Aleksandr Rystsov	Soviet Union	FW	1947–54	100	16
Sergei Salnikov	Soviet Union	FW	1946–49, 1955–60	201	64
Aleksandr Samedov	Russia	MF	2001–05	47	6
Viktor Samokhin	Soviet Union	MF	1974–81	188	3
Yuri Sedov	Soviet Union	DF	1948–55, 1957–59	176	2
Anatoli Seglin	Soviet Union	DF	1945–52	83	0
Viktor Semyonov	Soviet Union	FW	1937–47	104	49
Yuri Sevidov	Soviet Union	FW	1960–65	146	54
Igor Shalimov	Russia	MF	1986–91	95	20
Sergey Shavlo	Soviet Union	MF	1977–82, 1984–85	256	48
Aleksandr Shirko	Russia	FW	1993–2001	128	40
Roman Shishkin	Russia	DF	2003–08	54	1
Valeri Shmarov	Russia	FW	1987–91, 1995–96	143	54
Sergei Shvetsov	Soviet Union	DF	1981–84	68	14
Yevgeni Sidorov	Soviet Union	MF	1974–81, 1984–85	191	18
Dzhemal Silagadze	Soviet Union	FW	1968–71, 1973	91	12
Nikita Simonyan	Soviet Union	FW	1949–59	215	135
Boris Smyslov	Soviet Union	FW	1945–48	45	6
Florin Şoavă	Romania	DF	2004–05, 2007–08	52	1
Vladimir Sochnov	Soviet Union	DF	1981–85, 1989	148	9
Aleksei Sokolov	Soviet Union	FW	1938–41, 1942, 1944–47	114	49
Vasily Sokolov	Soviet Union	DF	1938–41, 1942–51	262	2
Viktor Sokolov	Soviet Union	DF	1936–41, 1942–46	121	0
Anatoli Soldatov	Soviet Union	DF	1958–65	113	1
Aleksandr Sorokin	Soviet Union	MF	1977–80	107	9
Andrei Starostin	Soviet Union	MF	1936–40	95	4
Vladimir Stepanov	Soviet Union	FW	1936–41, 1942	101	33
Andrejs Štolcers	Latvia	MF	2000	11	5
Martin Stranzl	Austria	DF	2006–2010	80	3
Yuri Susloparov	Soviet Union	DF	1986–90	80	1
Yuri Syomin	Soviet Union	MF	1965–67	43	6
Dmitri Sychev	Russia	FW	2002	18	9
Boris Tatushin	Soviet Union	FW	1953–58, 1961	116	38
Viktor Terentyev	Soviet Union	FW	1948–53	103	34
Andrey Tikhonov	Russia	MF	1992–2000	191	68
Oleg Timakov	Soviet Union	MF	1945–54	182	19
Nikolai Tishchenko	Soviet Union	DF	1951–58	106	0
Yegor Titov	Russia	MF	1992–2008	324	86
Eduard Tsykhmeystruk	Ukraine	FW	2001–02	35	5
Ilya Tsymbalar	Russia	MF	1993–99	146	42
Grigori Tuchkov	Soviet Union	DF	1937–41, 1942, 1944	74	2
Vladas Tučkus	Soviet Union	GK	1954–57	60	0
Ivan Varlamov	Soviet Union	DF	1964–68	75	0
Welliton	Brazil	FW	2007–2013	77	51
Vladimir Yanishevskiy	Soviet Union	FW	1965–66	46	7
Vladimir Yankin	Soviet Union	MF	1966–70	93	19
Georgi Yartsev	Soviet Union	FW	1977–80	116	55
Valentin Yemyshev	Soviet Union	FW	1948–53	23	9
Aleksei Yeryomenko	Soviet Union	MF	1986–87	26	5
Viktor Yevlentyev	Soviet Union	MF	1963–65, 1967–70	56	11
Sergei Yuran	Russia	FW	1995, 1999	26	5
Valeri Zenkov	Soviet Union	DF	1971–74	59	1
