= 1936 Soviet Top League =

1st season of top-tier football league in Soviet Union

The 1936 Soviet football championship (Russian: Футболное первество СССР в группе А 1936) was the first season conducted between teams (teams of masters) of sports societies and factories (production associations). It was also the seventh in order of primary football competitions in the Soviet Union since 1923 (the Soviet Union was established on 30 December 1922). It was a major transition from a previous season which involved participation of teams representing cities and republics composed of better players of that city or republics teams. The decision about conducting the first Soviet championship among teams of sports societies and factories was adopted by the All-Union Council of Physical Culture (VSFK) of the Soviet Union Central Executive Committee (Soviet Parliament). On 21 June 1936 the VSFK was liquidated and replaced with the All-Union Committee of Physical Culture and Sports (VKFKS) of the Soviet Union Sovnarkom (Soviet Government).

== Format and structure ==
The idea of new competition was announced on 21 March 1936 in the Russian newspaper "Krasnyi Sport" (Moscow) No. 41 (246). Note that "Krasnyi Sport" was the official publication of the All-Union Council (later Committee) of Physical Culture of the Soviet Union. The decision was adopted as beneficial by the March 27 session of the presidium of the All-Union Council of Physical Culture. The season was split into two championships with a cup competition between them that took place in August 1936. The first part (considered spring) started in late May and finished by mid of July with a single match played by each participant against each other (round-robin format). The same format was resumed in the fall that started in September finishing before November. Between first and second halves it was decided to conduct separate competition in elimination format which became the Soviet Cup. The main contenders for the title appeared to be the Moscow's Spartak and Dynamo.

The official format was announced by "Krasnyi Sport" on 11 May 1936 just couple of weeks before the start of the season on 24 May. It was stated that the spring championship is composed of three groups A, B, V and indicated what teams in which group. It also mentioned that each team would have a 22 players roster and players of those teams do not have rights transfer to other teams during the year. Each group was accounted of 7 teams. Krasnyi Sport stated that composition of the autumn championship would be determined on results of the spring championship. The points system was calculated in a following manner: 3 points for a win, 2 for a tie, 1 for a loss, no points was awarded for failing to appear for a game. The seasons' regulations also provided that in case of tie for the first position there would be organized additional "championship" game between tied teams. In case of other teams would tie for certain position, for the tiebreaker was used ratio of goals scored to allowed which was common tiebreak calculation throughout Europe at that time. About the use of goal ratio as a tiebreaker is also mentioned in the "Chronicles of Aksel Vartanian" that referenced to another Soviet journalist and sports researcher of football Aleksandr Perel. The same chronicles also state that originally there was supposed to have been a promotion-relegation play-off between the last placed team of the Group A (top tier) and the winner of the Group B (second tier). The play-off game was eventually canceled and the winner of Group B was simply admitted to Group A for the next season (same year, autumn half). According to Vartanian in his own opinion, the goal ratio as a tiebreaker may have not been the case as previously thought and possibly the reason why the promotion-relegation play-off was canceled.

The Soviet championship winner was awarded the Red Banner of the All-Union Committee.

=== Teams ===
Teams selection for the competition is not clearly determined. For the first championship were selected four Muscovite teams that previously competed in the 1935 Moscow football championship, two Leningrad teams that previously competed in the 1935 Leningrad football championship and a winner of the 1935 Ukrainian Dynamo football championship (Dynamomania). From Ukraine to the league was admitted the most politically reliable squad. Before the game between Dynamo Moscow and Spartak Moscow on 11 July 1936, "Krasnyi Sport" named it the focal game of the competition and mentioned their previous meetings as part of the Moscow football championship. Just before the season started the Muscovite team Kazanka changed its name to Lokomotiv Moscow upon establishment of the Lokomotiv sport society. It should be mentioned that parallel to the Soviet football championship, there also existed a separate competition that sometimes would coincide with primary football competition and was known as the games of three cities (or games of three capitals) including teams of Moscow, Leningrad and Kharkiv. The 1936 season in Group A also involved teams from only three cities Moscow, Leningrad and capital of Ukraine.

Teams of the 1936 spring championship in Group A

== Spring ==
Group A
- Season: 1936 spring
- Champions: FC Dynamo Moscow
- Relegated: none
- Matches: 21
- Goals: 85 (4.05 per match)
- Top goalscorer: (6) Mikhail Semichastny (Dynamo M.)
- Biggest home win: Spartak 6–1 Dynamo L. (June 10)
- Biggest away win: Krasnaya Zarya 2–7 Dynamo K. (May 31); CDKA 1–6 Dynamo K. (June 11)
- Highest scoring: Krasnaya Zarya 2–7 Dynamo K. (May 31)

=== Overview ===
The first game of the championship took place on May 22, 1936, two days before the official opening day announced earlier with the match FC Dynamo Leningrad - FC Lokomotiv Moscow on the Dynamo Stadium in Leningrad that ended in 3:1 win for the Leningrad team. The spring half finished on July 17, 1936, with two games in Moscow and Leningrad. The decisive game that guaranteed the title for Dynamo Moscow took place on July 11, 1936, when they beat Spartak 1:0 at Dynamo Stadium (Moscow). The host team for that game was considered to be Spartak. Please, also note that FC Krasnaya Zaria won a match against their city-mates FC Dynamo 1:0 at Dynamo Stadium (Leningrad) on June 5, 1936.

=== League standings ===
Pos	Team	Pld	W	D	L	GF	GA	GR	Pts	Republic
1	Dynamo Moscow	6	6	0	0	22	5	4.400	18	Russian SFSR
2	Dynamo Kiev	6	4	0	2	18	11	1.636	14	Ukrainian SSR
3	Spartak Moscow	6	3	1	2	12	7	1.714	13	Russian SFSR
4	CDKA Moscow	6	2	1	3	13	18	0.722	11	Russian SFSR
5	Lokomotiv Moscow	6	2	0	4	7	11	0.636	10	Russian SFSR
6	Dynamo Leningrad	6	1	1	4	5	12	0.417	9	Russian SFSR
7	Krasnaya Zarya Leningrad	6	1	1	4	8	21	0.381	9	Russian SFSR

Rules for classification: Classification is done by points and then goal ratio.

=== Results ===
Home \ Away	CDK	DYK	DLE	DYN	KZL	LOK	SPA
CDKA Moscow		1–6			6–2	0–3	
Dynamo Kiev			1–0	1–5			1–3
Dynamo Leningrad	1–1				0–1	3–1	
Dynamo Moscow	6–2		2–0		5–1	3–1	1–0
Krasnaya Zarya Leningrad		2–7				1–2	1–1
Lokomotiv Moscow		0–2					0–2
Spartak Moscow	0–3		6–1				

Legend: Blue = home team win; Yellow = draw; Red = away team win.

=== Round by round ===
The following table is a historic representation of the team's position in the standings after the completion of each round.

Team ╲ Round	1	2	3	4	5	6	7
CDKA Moscow	1	1	2	4	3	4	4
Dynamo Kyiv	6	3	3	2	4	2	2
Dynamo Leningrad	3	4	4	5	5	6	6
Dynamo Moscow	2	2	1	1	1	1	1
Krasnaya Zaria	5	5	5	6	6	7	7
Lokomotiv Moscow	4	6	7	7	7	5	5
Spartak Moscow	7	7	6	3	2	3	3

Source: helmsoccer.narod.ru (in Russian)

=== Top scorers ===
6 goals

- Mikhail Semichastny (Dynamo Moscow)

5 goals

- Vasily Pavlov (Dynamo Moscow)
- Vasily Smirnov (Dynamo Moscow)

4 goals

- Georgi Glazkov (Spartak Moscow)
- Makar Honcharenko (Dynamo Kiev)
- Sergei Ilyin (Dynamo Moscow)
- Pavlo Komarov (Dynamo Kiev)
- Konstantin Shchegotsky (Dynamo Kiev)

3 goals

- Viktor Lavrov (Lokomotiv Moscow)
- Mykola Makhynya (Dynamo Kiev)
- Pyotr Nikiforov (Spartak Moscow)
- Yevgeni Shelagin (CDKA Moscow)

== Medal squads ==
(league appearances and goals listed in brackets)

1. FC Dynamo Moscow

Goalkeepers: Aleksandr Kvasnikov (5 / -2), Yevgeny Fokin (2 / -3).
Defenders: Lev Korchebokov (5), Viktor Teterin (5).
Midfielders: Yevgeny Yeliseyev (6), Aleksandr Ryomin (6), Aleksey Lapshin (5), Pavel Korotkov (4), Viktor Dubinin (1).
Forwards: Mikhail Semichastny (6 / 6), Vasily Smirnov (6 / 5), Vasily Pavlov (6 / 5), Sergei Ilyin (6 / 4), Mikhail Yakushin (5 / 1), Aleksey Ponomaryov (1), Nikolai Postavnin.

One own goal scored by Ivan Andreyev (FC Lokomotiv Moscow)

Manager: Konstantin Kvashnin.

Transferred in during the season: Nikolay Postavnin (from FC Krylya Sovetov Moscow).

2. FC Dynamo Kyiv

Goalkeepers: Mykola Trusevych (5 / -6), Anton Idzkovsky (2 / -5).
Defenders: Mykhaylo Volin (6), Vasyl Pravovierov (4), Kostyantyn Fomin (3).
Midfielders: Volodymyr Greber (6 / 2), Ivan Kuzmenko (6 / 2), Iosif Livshyts (2), Oleksiy Klymenko (1), Mykhaylo Pustinin (1).
Forwards: Konstantin Shchegotsky (6 / 4), Mykola Makhynya (6 / 3), Fedir Tyutchev (6), Viktor Shylovsky (6), Makar Honcharenko (5 / 4), Pavlo Komarov (5 / 3), Petro Parovyshnikov (3), Mykola Korotkykh (1).

Manager: Moisey Tovarovsky.

Transferred out during the season: .

3. FC Spartak Moscow

Goalkeepers: Anatoly Akimov (4 / -5), Ivan Ryzhov (3 / -2).
Defenders: Stanislav Leuta (6 / 2), Aleksandr Mikhaylov (6), Gavriil Putilin (6), Aleksandr Starostin (4), Viktor Sokolov (2).
Midfielders: Andrey Starostin (6), Sergey Artemyev (3), Pyotr Starostin (2).
Forwards: Vladimir Stepanov (6 / 1), Georgy Glazkov (5 / 4), Pyotr Nikiforov (5 / 3), Matvey Zaytsev (4 / 2), Nikolay Zhigalin (2), Leonid Rumyantsev (2), Vladimir Yegorov (1), Boris Stepanov (1), Nikolay Glazkov (1), Nikolay Starostin (1).

Manager: Mikhail Kozlov.

Transferred out during the season: .

Group A 1936 winners

First title

== Stadiums ==
- Dynamo Stadium Krestovsky Island, Leningrad (Dynamo)
- Stadium of CDKA Sokolniki, Moscow (CDKA)
- Balitsky Dynamo Stadium Kiev (Dynamo)
- Dynamo Stadium Moscow (Dynamo, Spartak)
- Red Triangle Stadium Leningrad (Krasnaya Zaria)
- Lokomotiv Stadium Moscow (Lokomotiv) (called Stalinets at first)
- Lenin Stadium Leningrad (Krasnaya Zaria)

Note: Balitsky was Narkom of NKVD, later was executed during the Great Purge.

== Autumn ==
Group A
- Season: 1936 autumn
- Champions: FC Spartak Moscow
- Relegated: CDKA Moscow
- Matches: 28
- Goals: 117 (4.18 per match)
- Top goalscorer: (7) Georgi Glazkov (Spartak)
- Biggest home win: Lokomotiv 4–0 Dynamo L. (September 11); Dynamo Tb. 4–0 CDKA (October 8)
- Biggest away win: CDKA 0–6 Dynamo M. (October 17)
- Highest scoring: Dynamo M. 6–4 Dynamo K. (September 14)

Teams of the 1936 autumn championship in Group A

=== Overview ===
This tournament was exact replica of the spring championship by the format of the competition, including the nomination of points. The Georgian FC Dynamo Tbilisi was admitted to the League expanding it to eight teams. The defending champion was FC Dynamo Moscow.

It opened with two games in Leningrad and Moscow on September 5, 1936, soon after the Soviet Cup final that took place just week prior to that on August 28. The season concluded on October 30, 1936, with three games in Moscow, Leningrad, and Tbilisi. It was then when Spartak Moscow by beating CDKA at their home turf (CSKA Stadium) passed Dinamo Moscow in rankings to obtain the first place and with it the first national title.

=== League standings ===
Pos	Team	Pld	W	D	L	GF	GA	GR	Pts	Republic
1	Spartak Moscow (C)	7	4	2	1	19	10	1.900	17	Russian SFSR
2	Dynamo Moscow	7	3	3	1	21	12	1.750	16	Russian SFSR
3	Dynamo Tbilisi	7	3	3	1	14	9	1.556	16	Transcaucasian SFSR
4	Lokomotiv Moscow (Note: Lokomoyiv Moscow beat Dinamo Tbilisi in the Cup final 2:0. The first Soviet Cup edition took place exactly between the spring and the fall parts of 1936 seasons.)	7	4	0	3	18	14	1.286	15	Russian SFSR
5	Krasnaya Zarya Leningrad	7	3	0	4	13	18	0.722	13	Russian SFSR
6	Dynamo Kiev	7	1	3	3	16	19	0.842	12	Ukrainian SSR
7	Dynamo Leningrad	7	1	3	3	7	15	0.467	12	Russian SFSR
8	CDKA Moscow (Note: CDKA Moscow was relegated to the Group B (second tier) for the next season, however, soon after playing only three games in the 1937 season, the team was returned to the top tier for the next 1937 season.) (R)	7	2	0	5	9	20	0.450	11	Russian SFSR

Rules for classification: Classification is done by points and then goal ratio.
(C) Champions; (R) Relegated

=== Results ===
Home \ Away	CDK	DYK	DLE	DYN	DTB	KZL	LOK	SPA
CDKA Moscow			2–0	0–6				1–3
Dynamo Kiev	3–1					0–1	2–4	
Dynamo Leningrad		2–2		1–1				0–3
Dynamo Moscow		6–4			1–1		1–2	3–3
Dynamo Tbilisi	4–0	2–2	2–2			2–3	2–1	
Krasnaya Zarya Leningrad	3–2		1–2	1–3				
Lokomotiv Moscow	1–3		4–0			5–3		
Spartak Moscow		3–3			0–1	4–1	3–1	

Legend: Blue = home team win; Yellow = draw; Red = away team win.

=== Round by round ===
The following table is a historic representation of the team's position in the standings after the completion of each round.

Team ╲ Round	1	2	3	4	5	6	7	8	9	10
CDKA Moscow	3	3	1	2	4	5	5	7	7	8
Dynamo Kyiv	4	6	6	7	7	7	7	5	5	6
Dynamo Leningrad	8	8	8	8	8	8	8	8	8	7
Dynamo Moscow	1	1	2	3	1	2	2	1	1	2
Dynamo Tbilisi	5	7	7	4	5	1	4	4	4	3
Krasnaya Zaria	7	4	4	6	6	6	6	6	6	5
Lokomotiv Moscow	6	2	3	1	2	4	3	2	2	4
Spartak Moscow	2	5	5	5	3	3	1	3	3	1

Source: helmsoccer.narod.ru (in Russian)

=== Top scorers ===
7 goals

- Georgi Glazkov (Spartak Moscow)

6 goals

- Mikhail Berdzenishvili (Dinamo Tbilisi)
- Sergei Ilyin (Dynamo Moscow)
- Viktor Lavrov (Lokomotiv Moscow)
- Boris Paichadze (Dinamo Tbilisi)
- Vladimir Stepanov (Spartak Moscow)

5 goals

- Mikhail Kireyev (Lokomotiv Moscow)
- Vasili Smirnov (Dynamo Moscow)
- Pyotr Terenkov (Lokomotiv Moscow)

4 goals

- Mykola Makhynya (Dynamo Kiev)
- Viktor Shylovsky (Dynamo Kiev)
- Mikhail Yakushin (Dynamo Moscow)

== Medal squads ==
(league appearances and goals listed in brackets)

1. FC Spartak Moscow

Goalkeepers: Anatoly Akimov (6 / -6), Ivan Ryzhov (2 / -4).
Defenders: Stanislav Leuta (7), Aleksandr Mikhaylov (7), Aleksandr Starostin (7), Viktor Sokolov.
Midfielders: Andrey Starostin (7 / 2), Pyotr Starostin (7), Sergey Artemyev (1).
Forwards: Georgy Glazkov (7 / 7), Vladimir Stepanov (7 / 6), Boris Shchibrov (7 / 2), Valentin Liventsev (4 / 1), Stepan Kustylkin (4), Leonid Rumyantsev (4), Pyotr Nikiforov (3 / 1), Aleksey Yeryomin (1), Nikolay Zhigalin, Boris Stepanov.

Manager: Mikhail Kozlov.

Transferred out during the season: .

2. FC Dynamo Moscow

Goalkeepers: Aleksandr Kvasnikov (6 / -11), Nikolay Sokolov (1 / -1), Yevgeny Fokin.
Defenders: Lev Korchebokov (7), Viktor Teterin (2).
Midfielders: Yevgeny Yeliseyev (7 / 2), Aleksey Lapshin (7), Aleksandr Ryomin (7), Pavel Korotkov (5), Gavriil Kachalin (2), Arkady Chernyshev (1).
Forwards: Sergei Ilyin (7 / 6), Vasily Smirnov (7 / 5), Mikhail Yakushin (7 / 4), Mikhail Semichastny (7 / 1), Vasily Pavlov (4 / 2), Aleksey Ponomaryov (3 / 1), Nikolay Postavnin.

Manager: Konstantin Kvashnin.

Transferred out during the season: .

3. FC Dynamo Tbilisi

Goalkeepers: Aleksandr Dorokhov (7 / -9).
Defenders: Shota Shavgulidze (7), Eduard Nikolayshvili (6).
Midfielders: Vladimir Dzhorbenadze (7), Nikolay Anikin (6), Mikhail Minayev (6), Grigoriy Gagua (3), Vladimir Berdzenishvili (1).
Forwards: Mikhail Berdzenishvili (7 / 6), Boris Paichadze (7 / 6), Nikolay Somov (7 / 1), Ilya Panin (6), Vladimir Berdzenishvili (5 / 1), Mikhail Aslamazov (2), Aleksandr Eliava (1).

Manager: Gyula Limbek (until October), Grigoriy Pachuliya (since October).

Transferred out during the season: .

Group A 1936 winners

First title

== Stadiums ==
- Lenin Stadium Leningrad (Dynamo, Krasnaya Zaria)
- Stadium of CDKA Sokolniki, Moscow (CDKA)
- Balitsky Dinamo Stadium Kiev (Dynamo)
- Dynamo Stadium Aeroport, Moscow (Dynamo, Spartak)
- Lokomotiv Stadium Preobrazhenskoye, Moscow (Lokomotiv, CDKA) (Preobrazhenskoye is next to Sokolniki)
- Dynamo Stadium Tbilisi (Dynamo)

== See also ==
- 1936 Group B (Soviet football championship) – second tier
- 1936 Group V (Soviet football championship) – third tier
- 1936 Group G (Soviet football championship) – fourth tier
- 1936 Soviet Cup
