= Ivan Varlamov =

Soviet footballer and manager (1937–2020)

Personal information
- Full name: Ivan Alekseyevich Varlamov
- Date of birth: 23 October 1937
- Place of birth: Khutorok, Krasnodar Krai, USSR
- Date of death: 18 August 2020 (aged 82)
- Place of death: Moscow, Russia
- Position: Defender

Senior career*
Years	Team	Apps	(Gls)
1959–1962	FC Torpedo Armavir		
1963	FC Kuban Krasnodar	0	(0)
1964–1967	FC Spartak Moscow	75	(0)
1968	Politotdel Tashkent	40	(2)
1969–1972	Avtomobilist Krasnoyarsk		

International career
1964	USSR	1	(0)

Managerial career
- 1976: FC Spartak Moscow (director)
- 1980–1983: FC Spartak Moscow (assistant)
- 1984: FC Spartak Ordzhonikidze
- * Club domestic league appearances and goals

Ivan Alekseyevich Varlamov (Russian: Иван Алексеевич Варламов) (23 October 1937 – 18 August 2020) was a Soviet football player and manager. He was born in Khutorok, Krasnodar Krai.

== Honours ==
- Soviet Cup winner: 1965.

== International career ==
Varlamov played his only game for USSR on 4 November 1964 in a friendly against Algeria.
