= Sergei Rozhkov =

Sergei Rozhkov may refer to:

- Sergei Rozhkov (footballer) (1943–2026), Russian footballer
- Sergei Rozhkov (biathlete) (born 1972), Russian biathlete
