= Falin =

Falin is a surname of multiple origins. The feminine form of the Russian surname is Falina. Notable people with the surname include:

- Valentin Falin (1926–2018), Soviet and Russian diplomat, politician, and author
- Vasily Falin (1919–1958) Soviet World War II pilot, Hero of the Soviet Union
- Yuri Falin (1937–2003), Soviet footballer

== Fictional characters ==
- Falins, a family in John Fox, Jr.'s romance/Western novel, The Trail of the Lonesome Pine (1908)
