= Ivakin =

Ivakin (Russian: Ивакин) is a Russian masculine surname, its feminine counterpart is Ivakina. It may refer to

- Anatoliy Ivakin (born 1955), Russian physicist-acoustician
- Anton Ivakin (born 1991), Russian pole vaulter
- Valentin Ivakin (1930–2010), Russian football goalkeeper and manager
- Yaroslav Ivakin (born 1998), Russian football player
- Yekaterina Ivakina (born 1964), Russian javelin thrower
