= Dikarev =

Dikarev, feminine: Dikareva is a Russian surname derived from the nickname Dikar, 'savage person'. Notable people with the surname include:

- Marina Dikareva, birth name of Marina Saenko (born 1975), Russian football player
- Valeri Dikarev (1939–2001), Soviet football player
