= Anatoly Akimov =

Anatoly Akimov may refer to:

- Anatoly Akimov (water polo)
- Anatoly Akimov (footballer)
