= Sergei Rozhkov (footballer) =

Russian football player and coach (1943–2026)

Personal information
- Full name: Sergei Yegorovich Rozhkov
- Date of birth: 5 February 1943
- Place of birth: Moscow, Russian SFSR, Soviet Union
- Date of death: 23 May 2026 (aged 83)
- Positions: Midfielder; forward

Senior career*
Years	Team	Apps	(Gls)
1961–1965	Spartak Moscow		
1966–1967	FC Kairat		
1967–1969	Spartak Moscow		
1970–1973	FC Kairat		
1974–1975	FC Spartak Ryazan		
1975–1975	FC Kairat		

International career
1964	USSR	1	(0)

Managerial career
- 1994: FC TRASKO Moscow
- 1995: FC Dynamo-Gazovik Tyumen
- * Club domestic league appearances and goals

Sergei Yegorovich Rozhkov (Russian: Сергей Егорович Рожков; 5 February 1943 – 23 May 2026) was a Soviet and Russian football player and coach.

== International career ==
Rozhkov played his only game for USSR on 4 November 1964 in a friendly against Algeria.

== Death ==
Rozhkov died on 23 May 2026, at the age of 83.

== Honours ==
Spartak Moscow

- Soviet Top League: 1969
- Soviet Cup: 1963, 1965
