= Pavel Korotkov =

Personal information
- Full name: Pavel Mikhailovich Korotkov
- Date of birth: July 24, 1907
- Place of birth: Moscow, Russia
- Date of death: September 23, 1983 (aged 76)
- Place of death: Moscow, Russian SFSR, Soviet Union

Senior career*
Years	Team	Apps	(Gls)
1923–1940	Dynamo Moscow		
1941–1946	CDKA Moscow		

Managerial career
- 1947: CDKA Moscow (player-coach, ice hockey)
- 1948–1950: VVS Moscow (player-coach, ice hockey)
- * Club domestic league appearances and goals

Pavel Mikhailovich Korotkov (Russian: Павел Михайлович Коротков; July 24, 1907 in Moscow, Russia – September 23, 1983 in Moscow, Russian SFSR, Soviet Union) was a Russian ice hockey player, coach, as well as a football and bandy player.

== Career ==
Korotkov played football for Dynamo Moscow from 1923 to 1940 and CDKA Moscow from 1941 to 1946. He won the Soviet Top League with Dynamo Moscow in 1936 and 1937, as well as the Soviet Cup with them in 1937.

In bandy, Korotkov was Soviet champions with Dynamo Moscow in 1933, 1935, and 1936. He won the Soviet Cup with Dynamo Moscow in 1937, 1938, and 1940. He also won the cup with CDKA Moscow in 1945 and 1946.

He started his ice hockey career in 1947 as the player-coach of CDKA Moscow. Korotkov joined VVS Moscow and served as their player-coach from 1948 to 1950. He spent the next nine years as a representative of ice hockey in the Committee of Physical Education and Sports of the Soviet Union.

Korotkov was inducted into the Russian and Soviet Hockey Hall of Fame in 1952.
