= Yuri Falin =

Soviet footballer

Personal information
- Full name: Yuri Pavlovich Falin
- Date of birth: 2 April 1937
- Place of birth: Moscow, USSR
- Date of death: 3 November 2003 (aged 66)
- Place of death: Moscow, Russia
- Positions: Striker; midfielder

Youth career
- FShM Moscow

Senior career*
Years	Team	Apps	(Gls)
1955–1960	FC Torpedo Moscow	92	(33)
1961–1965	FC Spartak Moscow	126	(31)
1966	FC Kairat	21	(4)
1967–1968	FC Spartak Moscow	7	(3)
1968	FC Shinnik Yaroslavl	10	(0)
Total		256	(71)

International career
1958, 1964	USSR	3	(0)

Managerial career
- 1972: FC Dynamo Makhachkala (director)
- * Club domestic league appearances and goals

Yuri Pavlovich Falin (Russian: Юрий Павлович Фалин) (2 April 1937, in Moscow – 3 November 2003, in Moscow) was a Soviet football player.

== Honours ==
- Soviet Top League winner: 1960, 1962.
- Soviet Cup winner: 1960, 1963, 1965.

== International career ==
Falin made his debut for USSR on May 18, 1958 in a friendly against England. He played for USSR at the 1958 FIFA World Cup.
