= Valeri Dikarev =

Soviet footballer

Personal information
- Full name: Valeri Pavlovich Dikarev
- Date of birth: 10 September 1939
- Place of birth: Baku, USSR
- Date of death: January 2001 (aged 61)
- Position: Defender

Senior career*
| Years | Team | Apps | (Gls) |
| 1960 | Neftyanik Baku | 18 | (0) |
| 1961–1967 | FC Spartak Moscow | 192 | (1) |
| 1968 | FC Lokomotiv Moscow | 27 | (0) |
| 1969 | Volga Gorky | | |

International career
| 1964–1965 | USSR | 3 | (0) |
- * Club domestic league appearances and goals

Valeri Pavlovich Dikarev (Russian: Валерий Павлович Дикарев) (born 10 September 1939 in Baku; died in 2001) was a Soviet football player.

== Honours ==
- Soviet Top League winner: 1962.
- Soviet Cup winner: 1963, 1965.

== International career ==
Dikaryov made his debut for USSR on 11 October 1964 in a friendly against Austria. He played in a 1966 FIFA World Cup qualifier, but was not selected for the final tournament squad.
