= Valentin Ivakin =

Soviet footballer

Personal information
- Full name: Valentin Gavrilovich Ivakin
- Date of birth: 26 March 1930
- Place of birth: Uryupinsk, USSR
- Date of death: 24 November 2010 (aged 80)
- Position: Goalkeeper

Senior career*
Years	Team	Apps	(Gls)
1947–1952	Pischevik Uryupinsk		
1952	Dom Ofitserov Riga		
1953–1954	Daugava Riga		
1955–1956	CDSA Moscow	2	(0)
1957–1962	FC Spartak Moscow	101	(0)
1963–1967	FC Shinnik Yaroslavl	114	(0)

International career
1959	USSR	1	(0)

Managerial career
- 1968: FC Shinnik Yaroslavl (director)
- 1969–1978: FShM Moscow
- 1979: FC Spartak Ryazan
- 1980: FShM Moscow
- 1981–1984: FShM Moscow (director)
- 1983: RSFSR U–19 (assistant)
- 1983–1984: FShM Moscow
- 1985–1986: FShM Moscow
- 1986–1987: USSR U–19 (assistant)
- 1986–2001: FC Spartak Moscow (youth teams)
- * Club domestic league appearances and goals

Valentin Gavrilovich Ivakin (Russian: Валентин Гаврилович Ивакин) (26 March 1930 – 24 November 2010) was a Soviet football goalkeeper and manager.

== Playing career ==
Valentin Ivakin was born in Uryupinsk. At the age of 17 without former training in football he joined the local football club Pishevik. In 1952 he was sent for military service to Riga, Latvian SSR where he won the Latvian Higher League title and the Latvian Cup playing with AVN Riga. After the season Ivakin was selected to join Daugava Riga - the top football club in Soviet Latvia. Over two seasons he played 32 matches for Daugava, showing impressive performances which led to him being transferred to one of the top Soviet clubs - CDKA Moscow. In 1957 he moved to another top Moscow side - Spartak Moscow with which he won the Soviet Top League gold in 1958 and 1962, in addition to the Soviet Cup in 1958. At the age of 32 Ivakin had to leave Spartak as it was a usual practice in Soviet football to force footballers to retire at the age of 31-32, however Ivakin moved to FC Shinnik Yaroslavl with which he played until 1967. Ivakin also played one international match for USSR national football team - in a 1-0 victory against China in 1959.

== Coaching career ==
Upon retiring from playing Ivakin was appointed club director of Shinnik Yaroslavl. In later years he mostly worked with young footballers in Moscow, his only experience coaching a senior club was in 1979 when he was the head coach of second league club FC Spartak Ryazan. From 1986 to 1987 he coached the USSR U-21 national team. He was the first coach of Dmitri Kombarov and Kirill Kombarov.
