= Khutorok =

Khutorok Хуторок
- Village
- Location within Vologda Oblast Location within Russia
- Coordinates: 59°16′N 37°46′E
- Country: Russia
- Region: Vologda Oblast
- District: Cherepovetsky District
- Time zone: UTC+3:00

Khutorok (Russian: Хуторок) is a rural locality (a village) in Abakanovskoye Rural Settlement, Cherepovetsky District, Vologda Oblast, Russia. The population was 4 as of 2002.

== Geography ==
Khutorok is located 37 km (23 mi) northwest of Cherepovets (the district's administrative centre) by road. Kazimir is the nearest rural locality.
