= Mikhail Yakushin =

Russian footballer (1910-1997)

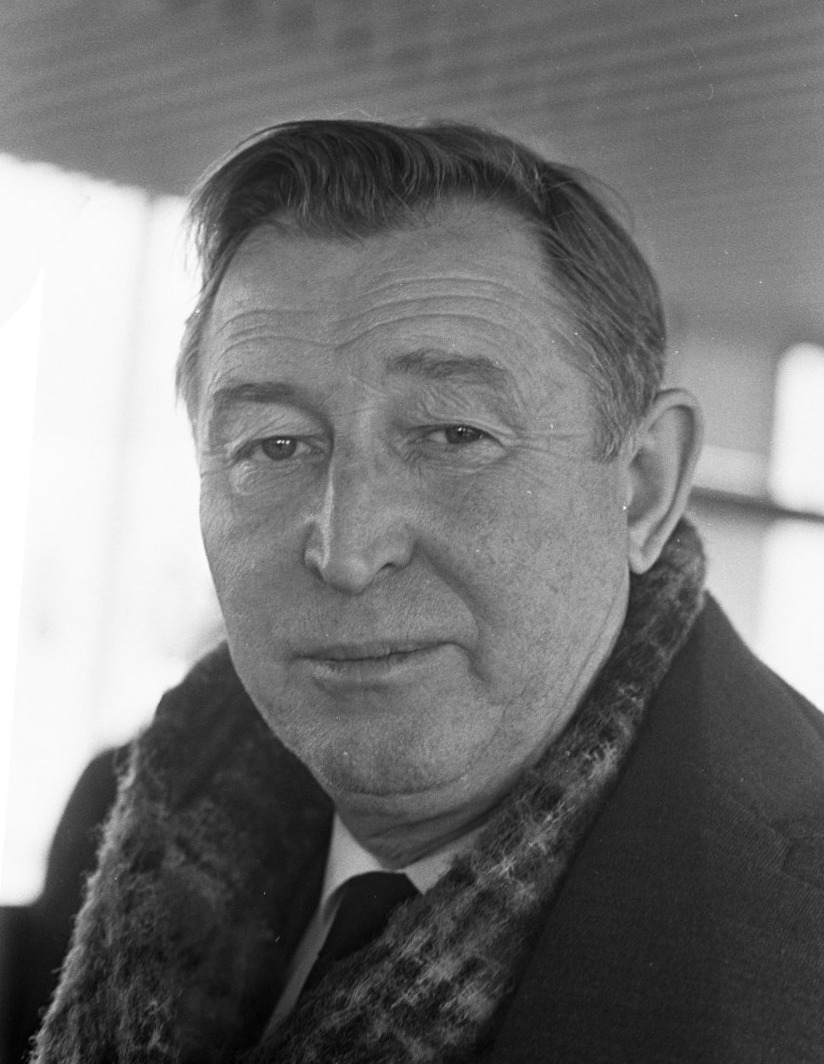
- Mikhail Yakushin in 1967

Personal information
- Full name: Mikhail Iosifovich Yakushin
- Date of birth: 15 November 1910
- Place of birth: Moscow, Russia
- Date of death: 3 February 1997 (aged 86)
- Place of death: Moscow, Russia
- Height: 1.83 m (6 ft 0 in)
- Position: Midfielder

Senior career*
| Years | Team | Apps | (Gls) |
| 1928–1929 | STS | | |
| 1931–1933 | SKiG | | |
| 1933–1944 | Dynamo Moscow | | |

Managerial career
- 1944–1950: Dynamo Moscow
- 1953–1960: Dynamo Moscow
- 1958–1959: USSR
- 1965–1966: Pakhtakor Tashkent
- 1967–1968: USSR
- 1969–1970: Pakhtakor Tashkent
- 1973: Lokomotiv Moscow
- * Club domestic league appearances and goals

Mikhail Iosifovich Yakushin (Russian: Михаил Иосифович Якушин; 15 November 1910 – 3 February 1997) was a Russian football and field hockey player, later a manager of Dynamo Moscow and the USSR.

== Playing career ==
Yakushin played football for Moscow clubs STS (1928–1929), SKiG (1931–1933), and Dynamo (1933–1944). He scored one goal in his three international matches for the Soviet national team. In the 1930s he also played field hockey for Dynamo, favoring hockey to football.

== Coaching career ==
As a manager, he coached Dynamo Moscow from 1944 to 1950 and from 1953 to 1960, winning six Soviet titles (1945, 1949, 1954, 1955, 1957, 1959). He was the head coach of the USSR national football team in 1959 and from 1967 to 1968.
