= Soviet Union national football team =

Men's association football team (1922–1991)

Soviet Union
1924–1991
- Nickname: Red Army
- Association: Football Federation of the Soviet Union
- Most caps: Oleg Blokhin (112)
- Top scorer: Oleg Blokhin (42)
- Home stadium: Central Lenin Stadium
- FIFA code: URS
First colours	Second colours

First international
- Soviet Union 3–0 Turkey (Moscow, Soviet Union; 16 November 1924)

Last international
- Cyprus 0–3 Soviet Union (Larnaca, Cyprus; 13 November 1991)

Biggest win
- Soviet Union 11–1 India (Moscow, Soviet Union; 16 September 1955); Finland 0–10 Soviet Union (Helsinki, Finland; 15 August 1957)

Biggest defeat
- England 5–0 Soviet Union (London, England; 22 October 1958)

World Cup
- Appearances: 7 (first in 1958)
- Best result: Fourth place (1966)

European Championship
- Appearances: 6 (first in 1960)
- Best result: Champions (1960)
Medal record
Men's football
UEFA European Championship
Gold medal – first place	1960 France	Team
Silver medal – second place	1964 Spain	Team
Silver medal – second place	1972 Belgium	Team
Silver medal – second place	1988 West Germany	Team
Olympic Games
Gold medal – first place	1956 Melbourne	Team
Gold medal – first place	1988 Seoul	Team
Bronze medal – third place	1972 Munich	Team
Bronze medal – third place	1976 Montreal	Team
Bronze medal – third place	1980 Moscow	Team

The Soviet Union national football team (Russian: сбо́рная СССР по футбо́лу, romanized: sbornaya SSSR po futbolu) was the national football team representing the Soviet Union from 1922 to 1991.

After the breakup of the Soviet Union in 1991, the team was transformed into the CIS national football team to participate in the Euro 1992. FIFA and UEFA consider the CIS national football team—and ultimately, the Russia national football team—as the Soviet successor team, with all former non-Olympic records allocated to them. Nevertheless, a large percentage of the Soviet team's former players came from outside the Russian SFSR, mainly from the Ukrainian SSR; following the breakup of the Soviet Union, some, such as Andrei Kanchelskis from the former Ukrainian SSR, continued to play in the new Russia national football team.

The Soviet Union failed to qualify for the World Cup only twice, in 1974 and 1978, and attended seven finals tournaments in total. Their best finish was fourth in 1966, when they lost to West Germany in the semifinals, 2–1. The Soviet Union qualified for five European Championships, winning the inaugural competition in 1960 when they beat Yugoslavia in the final, 2–1. They finished second three times (1964, 1972, 1988), and fourth once (1968), when, having drawn with Italy in the semi-final, they were sent to the third-place playoff match by the loss of a coin toss.

The Soviet Union national team also participated in a number of Olympic tournaments, earning the gold medal in 1956 and 1988. The Soviet team continued to field its national team players in Olympic tournaments despite FIFA's prohibition in 1958 to field any national team players in Olympics; players in the Olympics were required to be amateurs at the time, but the Soviets effectively bent the rules by listing their best players in the military.

== History ==
=== First games ===
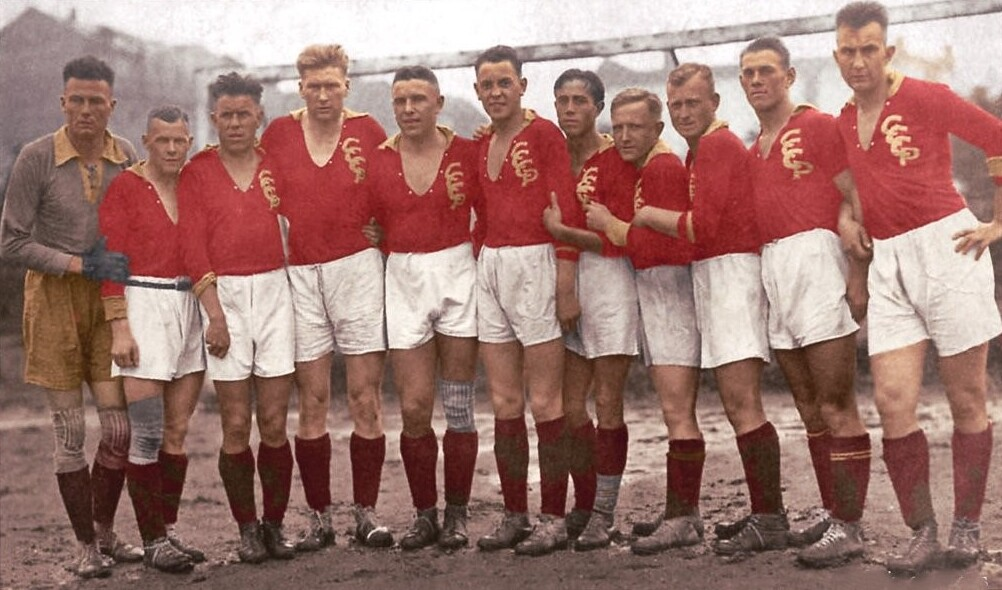
Soviet Union team of 1927

Because of the circumstances, surrounding October Revolution and later the 1917–1922 Russian Civil War, Soviet Russia was internationally diplomatically isolated, making it unable to participate in the international competitions. In 1922, Soviet Union was formed. After the civil war, the Soviet Union managed to establish international communication with politically similar factions in Europe and around the globe. The Soviet Union joined the Red Sport International proclaiming any sports events outside of the RSI to be "part of the bourgeoisie".

The first international match played by a Soviet team (as the Russian SFSR) came in September 1922, when the Finnish Workers' Sports Federation football team toured Russia (Russia formed the Soviet Union at the end of December 1922, Treaty on the Creation of the Union of Soviet Socialist Republics). The Soviet Russia XI scored a 4–1 victory over the Finns in Petrograd. This was also the first international contact for Soviet sports after the 1917 October Revolution. In May 1923, the Soviet team visited Finland and beat the Finnish squad 5–0. The first match against national team was played in August 1923, nine months after the establishment of the Soviet Union, when a Russian SFSR team beat Sweden 2–1 in Stockholm.

The first match as the actual Soviet Union football team took place a year later, a 3–0 win over Turkey. This and a return match in Ankara were the only officially recognised international matches played by the Soviet Union prior to the 1952 Summer Olympics, though several unofficial friendlies against Turkey took place in the 1930s. The 1952 Olympics was the first competitive tournament entered by the Soviet Union. In the preliminary round, Bulgaria were defeated 2–1, earning a first-round tie against Yugoslavia. Before the match, both Tito and Stalin sent telegrams to their national teams, which showed just how important it was for the two heads of state. Yugoslavia led 5–1, but a Soviet comeback in the last 15 minutes resulted in a 5–5 draw. The match was replayed, Yugoslavia winning 3–1. The defeat to the archrivals hit Soviet football hard, and after just three games played in the season, CSKA Moscow, who had made up most of the Soviet Union squad, was forced to withdraw from the league and later disbanded. Furthermore, Boris Arkadiev, who coached both the Soviet Union and CSKA, was stripped of his Merited Master of Sports of the USSR title.

=== Sweden trials and the triumph ===
The Soviet Union, coached by Gavriil Khachalin, entered the World Cup for the first time at the 1958 tournament, following a qualification playoff against Poland. Drawn in a group with Brazil, England, and Austria, they collected three points in total, one from England and two from Austria. The Soviet Union and England went to a playoff game, in which Anatoli Ilyin scored in the 67th minute to knock England out. The Soviet Union was then eliminated by the hosts of the tournament, Sweden, in the quarter-finals.

The inaugural European Championships in 1960 marked the pinnacle of Soviet footballing achievement. Easily progressing to the quarter-finals, the team were scheduled to face Spain, but due to the tensions of the Cold War, Spain refused to travel to the Soviet Union, resulting in a walkover. In the semi-final, the Soviet team defeated Czechoslovakia 3–0 and reached the final, where they faced Yugoslavia.

In the final, Yugoslavia scored first, but the Soviet Union, led by legendary goalkeeper Lev Yashin, equalized in the 49th minute. After 90 minutes the score was 1–1, and Viktor Ponedelnik scored with seven minutes left in extra time to give the Soviets the inaugural European Championship.

=== The end of Kachalin's dream-team ===
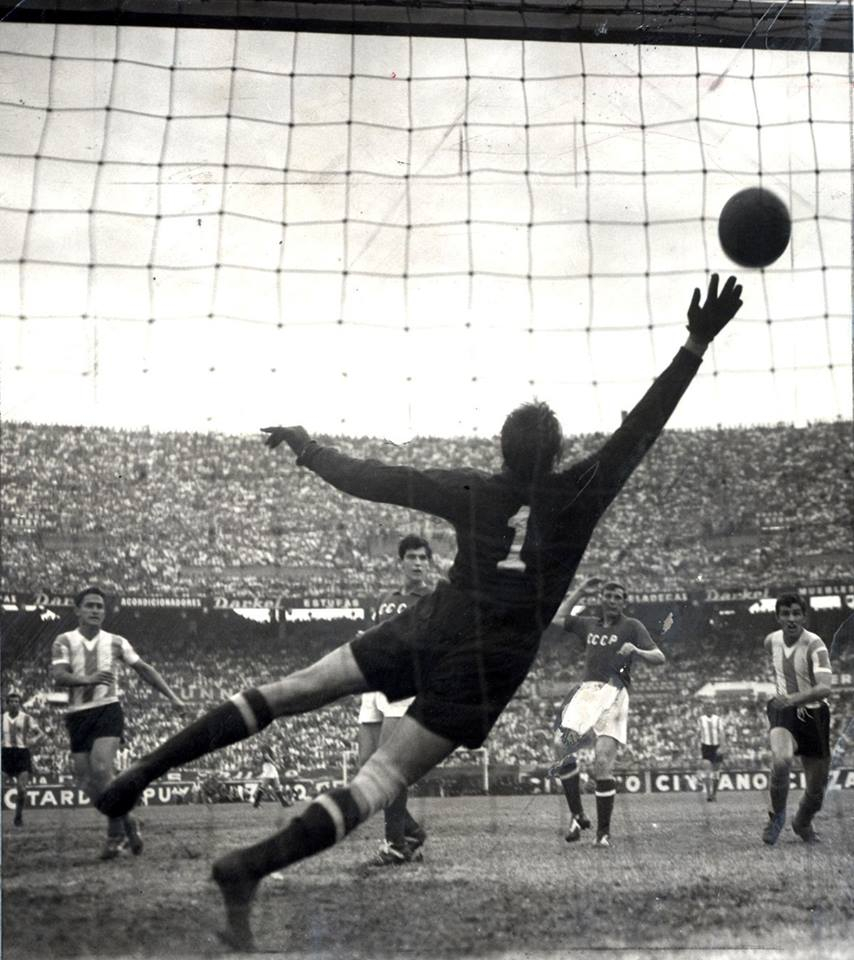
Lev Yashin trying to stop the shot by Argentine striker José Sanfilippo, during the match played at Buenos Aires in 1961. The Soviet Union won 2–1

In the 1962 World Cup, the Soviet team was in Group 1 with Yugoslavia, Colombia, and Uruguay. The match between the Soviet Union and Colombia ended 4–4; Colombia scored a series of goals (68', 72', 86'). The Soviets topped the group, but again were knocked out by the hosts on the quarter finals. Star goalkeeper Lev Yashin was in poor form both against Colombia and Chile. His form was considered one of the main reasons why the Soviet Union team did not gain more success in the tournament.

In 1964, the Soviet Union attempted to defend their European Championship title, defeating Italy in the last 16 (2–0, 1–1) and to reach the quarter-finals. After two matches against Sweden, the Soviet side won on aggregate (1–1, 3–1). The Soviet Union team went to Spain where the finals were held. In the semi-finals, the Soviet Union defeated Denmark 3–0 in Barcelona but their dreams of winning the title again were dashed in the final when Spain, the host, scored a late goal, winning 2–1.

=== The late 1960s: Semi-finals at World Cup and European Championships ===
The 1966 FIFA World Cup was the tournament in which the Soviet Union team reached their best result by finishing in fourth place. The Soviet Union was in Group 4 with North Korea, Italy and Chile. In all three matches, the Soviet Union team managed to defeat their rivals. The Soviet team then defeated Hungary in the quarter-finals thanks to the effective performance of their star, Lev Yashin but their success was ended by two defeats on 25 and 28 July, against West Germany in the semi-finals and Portugal in the third-place playoff match, respectively. The 1966 squad was the second-best scoring Soviet team in World Cup history, with 10 goals.

For the Euro 1968, the qualification competition was played in two stages; a group stage (taking place from 1966 until 1968) and the quarter-finals (played in 1968). Again, only four teams could reach the finals which were held in Italy. The semi-final match between the Soviet Union and Italy ended 0–0. It was decided to toss a coin to see who reached the final, rather than play a replay. Italy won, and went on to become European champions. On 8 June 1968, the Soviets were defeated by England in the third-place match.

=== Kachalin's second attempt ===
The 1970 World Cup started with the match between Mexico and the Soviet Union. The Soviet team became the first team to make a substitution in World Cup history in this match. Other opponents in their group were Belgium and El Salvador. The Soviet team easily qualified to the quarter-final where they lost against Uruguay in extra time. This was the last time the Soviet Union reached the quarter-finals.

The final tournament of the 1972 European Championships took place between 14 and 18 June 1972. Again, only four teams were in the finals. The Soviets defeated Hungary 1–0, with a second-half goal. The final was between West Germany and the Soviet Union. The match ended with a victory of the German side thanks to the effective football of Gerd Müller. This tournament was one of the two tournaments in which the Soviet Union finished as runner-up.

=== Failures to qualify in the 1970s ===
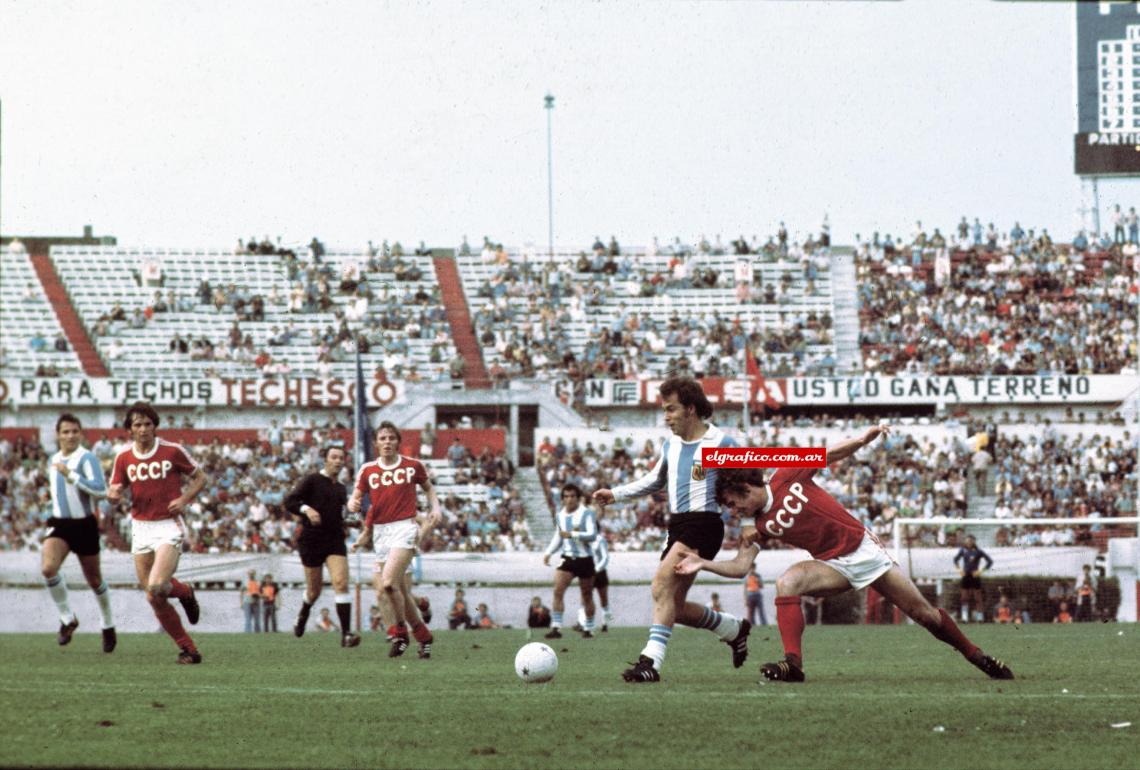
The Soviet Union playing Argentina at El Monumental, Buenos Aires, November 1976

After being runners up at Euro 1972, the rest of the 1970s were bleak for the Soviets, who were disqualified from the 1974 World Cup as a result of a refusal to play Chile in the aftermath of the 1973 Chilean coup d'état and failed to qualify for the 1978 World Cup or the 1976 and 1980 European Championships.

=== Beskov recovers the team ===
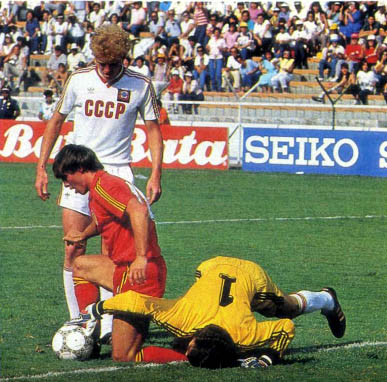
Soviet Union v Belgium at the 1986 World Cup

The 1982 World Cup was the Soviet Union's first major tournament appearance for a decade. The Soviet Union was in Group 6 with Brazil, Scotland, and New Zealand. Goals by Sócrates and Éder Aleixo marked the defeat of the Soviet side against Brazil in the first group match and they were eventually eliminated in the second round by finishing the group in second place when they defeated Belgium only 1–0 and drew against Poland with an 0–0 results. In 1984, the Soviets again failed to qualify for the European Championships, but succeeded in qualifying for the 1986 World Cup. The Soviet Union was in Group C with Hungary, France, and Canada. The Soviets used Irapuato, Guanajuato as their training ground in the World Cup.

The Soviet team enjoyed a successful group stage by scoring nine goals and finishing the group in first place. Ultimately, however, they lost to Belgium 3–4 after extra time in the round of 16. Despite their poor performance in the cup, this team was the best scoring Soviet team in World Cup history, with 12 goals.

=== Lobanovsky era and demise of Soviet Union ===
After failing to qualify for three consecutive European Cups (1976, 1980, 1984), the Soviets managed to qualify for the 1988 competition, the last time the Soviet Union national football team took part in the European Football Championship. The finals were held in West Germany, with eight teams participating. Soviet Union finished Group B as leaders above the Netherlands and defeated Italy 2–0 in the semi-final. In the final against the Netherlands, another team from Group B, the Netherlands avenged their group stage defeat, winning by a score of 2–0 to be crowned European champions.

The final major championship contested by the Soviet team was the 1990 FIFA World Cup, where they were drawn in Group B with Argentina, Romania and Cameroon. The only success for the Soviets came when they defeated group leaders Cameroon 4–0. The Soviets lost their other matches and failed to qualify from the group, the only time in their World Cup history this happened. The Soviet Union qualified for Euro 1992, but the breakup of the Soviet Union meant that their place was instead taken by the CIS national football team, composed of newly independent Soviet republics. After the tournament, the former Soviet republics competed as separate independent nations, with FIFA allocating the Soviet team's record to Russia.

== Kit evolution ==
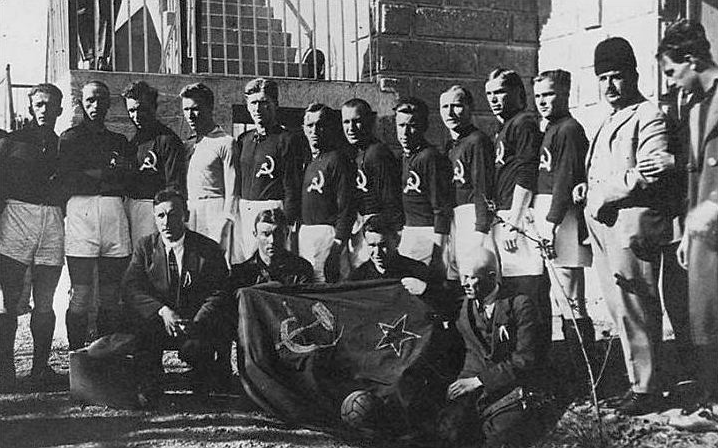
The Soviet team in 1925

The Soviet Union traditionally wore red jerseys with white shorts and red socks.

== Home stadium ==
From the Soviet Union's first fixture (16 November 1924 vs. Turkey) they played their home games at various stadiums.

Venue	City		Played	Won	Drawn	Lost	GF	GA	Points per game
Central Lenin Stadium	Moscow	1956–1992	78	50	18	10	151	50	2.15
Central Stadium	Kiev	1969–1990	12	10	1	1	27	6	2.58
Lenin Dynamo Stadium	Tbilisi	1967–1987	10	6	1	3	19	9	1.9
Dynamo Stadium	Moscow	1954–1971	9	7	2	0	41	8	2.56
Lokomotiv Stadium	Simferopol	1979–1989	4	4	0	0	11	1	3
Kirov Stadium	Leningrad	1967–1984	3	3	0	0	8	1	3
Hrazdan Stadium	Yerevan	1978	2	2	0	0	12	2	3
Central Lokomotiv Stadium	Moscow	1979–1988	2	2	0	0	5	1	3
Central Stadium	Volgograd	1977	1	1	0	0	4	1	3
Pakhtakor Central Stadium	Tashkent	1975	1	1	0	0	2	1	3
Vorovsky Stadium	Moscow	1924	1	1	0	0	3	0	0
Black Sea Shipping Stadium	Odessa	1974	1	0	0	1	0	1	0
Totals		1924–1992	123	86	22	15	281	80	2.28

Statistics include official FIFA-recognised matches only.

Note:

- Although never used by either the Soviet Union national football team nor Soviet Union Olympic football team, Dinamo Stadium in Minsk was designated as the official stadium for the 1980 Summer Olympics.

== Coaching history ==
Manager	Nation	Years	Played	Won	Drawn	Lost	GF	GA	Win %	Qualifying cycle	Final tour
Boris Arkadiev	(Soviet Union)	1952	3	1	1	1	8	9	33.33		1952(o)
Vasily Sokolov	(Soviet Union)	1954	2	1	1	0	8	1	50		
Gavriil Kachalin	(Soviet Union)	1955–1958	34	22	6	6	88	35	64.71	1956(o), 1958, 1960	1956(o), 1958
Georgiy Glazkov	(Soviet Union)	1959	1	1	0	0	3	1	100		
Mikhail Yakushin	(Soviet Union)	1959	2	2	0	0	2	0	100	1960	
Gavriil Kachalin	(Soviet Union)	1960–1962	22	16	2	4	49	20	72.73	1962	1960, 1962
Nikita Simonyan	(Soviet Union)	1963	1	0	0	1	0	1	0		
Konstantin Beskov	(Soviet Union)	1963–1964	9	4	4	1	14	7	44.44	1964	1964
Nikita Simonyan	(Soviet Union)	1964	1	0	1	0	2	2	0		
Nikolai Morozov	(Soviet Union)	1964–1966	31	15	9	7	51	33	48.39	1966	1966
Mikhail Yakushin	(Soviet Union)	1967–1968	28	16	7	5	51	31	57.14	1968, 1968(o)	1968
Gavriil Kachalin	(Soviet Union)	1969–1970	18	9	7	2	29	11	50	1970	1970
Valentin Nikolayev	(Soviet Union)	1970–1971	13	8	5	0	24	5	61.54	1972	
Nikolay Gulyayev	(Soviet Union)	1972	4	2	1	1	6	4	50	1972	
Aleksandr Ponomarev	(Soviet Union)	1972	15	8	4	3	27	17	53.33		1972(o), 1972
German Zonin	(Soviet Union)	1972	3	1	0	2	1	2	33.33		
Yevgeny Goryansky	(Soviet Union)	1973	10	3	2	5	6	6	30	1974*	
Konstantin Beskov	(Soviet Union)	1974	3	1	0	2	1	4	33.33	1976	
Valeriy Lobanovsky	(Soviet Union)	1975–1976	19	11	4	4	33	18	57.89	1976	1976(o)
Valentin Nikolayev	(Soviet Union)	1976	2	0	1	1	0	2	0		
Nikita Simonyan	(Soviet Union)	1977–1979	27	18	4	5	60	22	66.67	1978, 1980	
Konstantin Beskov	(Soviet Union)	1979–1982	28	17	8	3	54	19	60.71	1980, 1982	1982
Oleg Bazilevich	(Soviet Union)	1979	1	1	0	0	3	1	100		
Valeriy Lobanovsky	(Soviet Union)	1982–1983	10	6	3	1	18	6	60	1984	
Eduard Malofeyev	(Soviet Union)	1984–1986	25	14	3	8	37	23	56	1986	
Valeriy Lobanovsky	(Soviet Union)	1986–1987	17	9	6	2	31	11	52.94	1988	1986
Nikita Simonyan	(Soviet Union)	1988	1	1	0	0	4	0	100		
Morozov and Mosyagin	(Soviet Union)	1988	4	1	2	1	5	5	25		
1st Coaching Staff	(Soviet Union)	1988–1990	31	16	6	9	42	29	51.61	1990	1988, 1990
2nd Coaching Staff	(Soviet Union)	1990–1992	28	12	11	5	39	24	42.86	1992	1992

Notes:

- The game that took place on 21 November 1973 between the national team of Chile and missing side did not go on record of Yevgeny Goryansky.
- The 1980 USSR Olympic roster (coach – Beskov) was identical with the senior team that competed in qualification tournaments in 1979–1981.
- In 1985–1989 the national team competed in the annual Nehru Cup (India).
- The 1st coaching staff consisted of Valeriy Lobanovsky (leading), Yuri Morozov and Sergei Mosyagin.
- The 2nd coaching staff consisted of Anatoly Byshovets (leading), Vladimir Salkov and Gadzhi Gadzhiyev.

== Player records ==
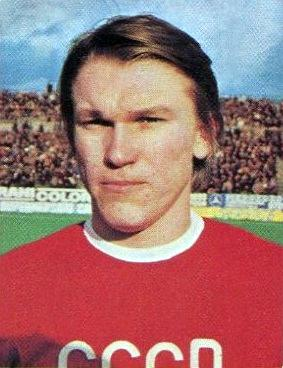
Oleg Blokhin is Soviet Union's top goalscorer and their most capped player.

Most appearances
Rank	Player	Caps	Goals	Career
1	Oleg Blokhin	112	42	1972–1988
2	Rinat Dasayev	91	0	1979–1990
3	Albert Shesternev	90	0	1961–1971
4	Anatoliy Demyanenko	80	6	1981–1990
5	Volodymyr Bezsonov	79	4	1977–1990
6	Lev Yashin	78	0	1954–1967
7	Sergei Aleinikov (Note: Sergei Aleinikov also made four appearances for Belarus.)	77	6	1984–1991
8	Murtaz Khurtsilava	69	6	1965–1973
9	Oleg Protasov (Note: Oleg Protasov also made one appearance for Ukraine.)	68	28	1984–1991
10	Valeriy Voronin	66	5	1960–1968

Top goalscorers
Rank	Player	Goals	Caps	Ratio	Career
1	Oleg Blokhin	42	112	0.38	1972–1988
2	Oleg Protasov	29	68	0.43	1984–1991
3	Valentin Ivanov	26	59	0.44	1956–1965
4	Eduard Streltsov	25	38	0.66	1955–1968
5	Viktor Kolotov	22	55	0.4	1970–1978
6	Viktor Ponedelnik	20	29	0.69	1960–1966
6	Igor Chislenko	20	53	0.38	1959–1968
8	Anatoliy Banishevskiy	19	50	0.38	1965–1972
9	Anatoliy Ilyin	16	31	0.52	1952–1959
10	Anatoliy Byshovets	15	39	0.38	1966–1972

== Competitive record ==
=== FIFA World Cup ===
Champions Runners-up Third place Fourth place

FIFA World Cup record										Qualification Record					
Year	Round	Position	Pld	W	D	L	GF	GA	Squads	Pld	W	D	L	GF	GA
(Uruguay) 1930	Not a FIFA member									Not a FIFA member					
(Italy) 1934	Not a FIFA member									Not a FIFA member					
(France) 1938	Not a FIFA member									Not a FIFA member					
(Brazil) 1950	Did not enter									Did not enter					
(Switzerland) 1954	Did not enter									Did not enter					
(Sweden) 1958	Quarter-finals	7th	5	2	1	2	5	6	Squad	5	4	0	1	18	3
(Chile) 1962	Quarter-finals	6th	4	2	1	1	9	7	Squad	4	4	0	0	11	3
(England) 1966	Fourth place	4th	6	4	0	2	10	6	Squad	6	5	0	1	19	6
(Mexico) 1970	Quarter-finals	5th	4	2	1	1	6	2	Squad	4	3	1	0	8	1
(West Germany) 1974	Did not qualify									6	3	1	2	5	4
(Argentina) 1978	Did not qualify									4	2	0	2	5	3
(Spain) 1982	Second group stage	7th	5	2	2	1	7	4	Squad	8	6	2	0	20	2
(Mexico) 1986	Round of 16	10th	4	2	1	1	12	5	Squad	8	4	2	2	13	8
(Italy) 1990	Group stage	17th	3	1	0	2	4	4	Squad	8	4	3	1	11	4
Total	Fourth place	7/14	31	15	6	10	53	34	—	53	35	9	9	110	34

=== UEFA European Championship ===
Champions Runners-up Third Place Fourth Place

UEFA European Championship record										Qualification Record					
Year	Round	Position	Pld	W	D	L	GF	GA	Squads	Pld	W	D	L	GF	GA
(France) 1960	Champions	1st	2	2	0	0	5	1	Squad	2	2	0	0	4	1
(Spain) 1964	Runners-up	2nd	2	1	0	1	4	2	Squad	4	2	2	0	7	3
(Italy) 1968	Fourth place	4th	2	0	1	1	0	2	Squad	8	6	0	2	19	8
(Belgium) 1972	Runners-up	2nd	2	1	0	1	1	3	Squad	8	5	3	0	16	4
(Socialist Federal Republic of Yugoslavia) 1976	Did not qualify									8	4	1	3	12	10
(Italy) 1980	Did not qualify									6	1	3	2	7	8
(France) 1984	Did not qualify									6	4	1	1	11	2
(West Germany) 1988	Runners-up	2nd	5	3	1	1	7	4	Squad	8	5	3	0	14	3
(Sweden) 1992	Qualified, but dissolved and replaced by CIS national football team									8	5	3	0	13	2
Total	1 Title	5/8	13	7	2	4	17	12	—	58	34	16	8	103	41

=== Olympic Games ===
Olympic Games record
Year	Round	Position	Pld	W	D	L	GF	GA	Squads
1896–1912	Preceded with Russian Empire								
1920–1948	Did not enter								
(Finland) 1952	Round 1	14th	3	1	1	1	8	9	Squad
(Australia) 1956	Gold medal	1st	5	4	1	0	9	2	Squad
(Italy) 1960	Did not qualify								
(Japan) 1964	Did not qualify								
(Mexico) 1968	Did not qualify								
(West Germany) 1972	Bronze medal	3rd	7	5	1	1	17	6	Squad
(Canada) 1976	Bronze medal	3rd	5	4	0	1	10	4	Squad
(Soviet Union) 1980	Bronze medal	3rd	6	5	0	1	19	3	Squad
(United States) 1984	Did not enter								
(South Korea) 1988	Gold medal	1st	6	5	1	0	14	4	Squad
Total	Gold medal	6/20	32	24	4	4	77	28	—

=== All-time records ===
Against	Played	Won	Drawn	Lost	GF	GA	GD	Member of
Algeria	3	2	1	0	6	2	4	CAF
Ankara and İzmir XI	1	1	0	0	6	1	+5	TFF
Argentina	11	2	6	3	10	11	–1	CONMEBOL
Australia	1	0	0	1	1	2	–1	OFC
Austria	14	7	3	4	19	13	+6	UEFA
Belgium	5	4	0	1	10	5	+5	UEFA
Brazil	7	1	1	5	5	13	–8	CONMEBOL
Bulgaria	15	9	5	1	27	12	+15	UEFA
Cameroon	1	1	0	0	4	0	+4	CAF
Canada	1	1	0	0	2	0	+2	CONCACAF
Chile	6	4	1	1	10	4	+6	CONMEBOL
China	5	4	1	0	12	4	+8	AFC
Colombia	3	1	2	0	7	5	+2	CONMEBOL
Costa Rica	1	1	0	0	2	1	+1	CONCACAF
Cyprus	4	4	0	0	16	2	+14	UEFA
Czechoslovakia	12	6	4	2	21	12	+9	UEFA
Denmark	10	8	1	1	30	10	+20	UEFA
East Germany	15	7	5	3	22	14	+8	UEFA
Egypt	1	0	0	1	1	2	–1	CAF
El Salvador	4	4	0	0	8	0	+8	CONCACAF
England	12	3	4	5	15	21	–6	UEFA
Estonia	1	0	1	0	2	2	0	UEFA
Finland	13	8	5	0	39	10	+29	UEFA
France	12	6	4	2	18	13	+5	UEFA
Germany	3	0	0	3	2	7	–5	UEFA
Greece	11	9	0	2	25	5	+21	UEFA
Guatemala	1	1	0	0	3	0	+3	CONCACAF
Hungary	21	10	7	4	35	20	+15	UEFA
Iceland	6	3	3	0	12	4	+8	UEFA
India	6	6	0	0	29	2	+27	AFC
Indonesia	3	1	2	0	4	0	+4	AFC
Iran	3	3	0	0	4	0	+4	AFC
Israel	5	4	0	1	14	5	+9	UEFA
Italy	12	5	5	2	12	8	+4	UEFA
Japan	3	3	0	0	11	2	+9	AFC
North Korea	1	1	0	0	3	0	+3	AFC
South Korea	3	2	1	0	5	2	+3	AFC
Kuwait	2	2	0	0	3	0	+3	AFC
Luxembourg	1	1	0	0	3	1	+2	UEFA
Mexico	10	2	7	1	6	2	+4	CONCACAF
Morocco	3	2	1	0	5	3	+2	CAF
Netherlands	7	2	2	3	4	8	–4	UEFA
New Zealand	1	1	0	0	3	0	+3	OFC
Northern Ireland	4	2	2	0	4	1	+3	UEFA
Norway	8	7	1	0	18	3	+15	UEFA
Peru	3	2	1	0	4	0	+4	CONMEBOL
Poland	13	6	4	3	24	11	+13	UEFA
Portugal	4	1	0	3	6	4	+2	UEFA
Republic of Ireland	8	4	1	3	8	8	0	UEFA
Romania	9	4	2	3	13	10	+3	UEFA
Scotland	5	3	1	1	6	5	+1	UEFA
Spain	5	1	2	2	4	6	–2	UEFA
Sweden	18	8	6	4	38	20	+10	UEFA
Switzerland	7	4	3	0	16	7	+9	UEFA
Syria	1	1	0	0	2	0	+2	AFC
Trinidad and Tobago	2	2	0	0	3	0	+3	CONCACAF
Tunisia	1	1	0	0	3	0	+3	CAF
Turkey	26	19	4	3	57	25	+32	UEFA
United States	4	2	1	1	5	3	+2	CONCACAF
Uruguay	7	6	0	1	14	4	+10	CONMEBOL
Wales	5	3	1	1	6	3	+3	UEFA
West Germany	12	3	0	9	11	22	–11	UEFA
Venezuela	1	0	1	0	1	1	0	CONMEBOL
Yugoslavia	17	11	4	2	33	17	+14	UEFA
Zambia	1	1	0	0	4	0	+4	CAF

== Honours ==
=== Global ===
- Olympic Games
  - (gold) Gold Medal (2): 1956, 1988
  - (bronze) Bronze Medal (3): 1972, 1976, 1980

=== Continental ===
- UEFA European Championship
  - (gold) Champions (1): 1960
  - (silver) Runners-up (3): 1964, 1972, 1988

=== Friendly ===
- Nehru Cup
  - (gold) Champions (1): 1985

=== Awards ===
- Gazzetta Sports World Team of the Year: 1979

=== Summary ===
Competition	1st place, gold medalist(s)	2nd place, silver medalist(s)	3rd place, bronze medalist(s)	Total
FIFA World Cup	0	0	0	0
Olympic Games	2	0	3	5
UEFA European Championship	1	3	0	4
Total	3	3	3	9

== See also ==
- Russia national football team
- CIS national football team
- Soviet Union national under-21 football team
- Soviet Union national under-18 football team
- Soviet Union national under-16 football team
- Soviet Union women's national football team
- Soviet Union national football team all-time record

== Notes ==
Preceded by Inaugural champions	European champions 1960 (first title)	Succeeded by 1964 Spain
