= Vasily Sokolov (footballer) =

Russian footballer and coach

Vasily Nikolayevich Sokolov (Russian: Василий Николаевич Соколов) (30 January 1912 – 12 February 1981) was a Soviet football defender and coach.

== Career ==
In 1929, he began his career in local football team Żeldor. He played for DKA Smolensk (1934–1936). In October 1936, he played one match for CDKA Moscow, and the following year he returned to Smolensk DKA. In 1938, he moved to Spartak Moscow, where he achieved his greatest success. With the beginning of the Great Patriotic War he joined Krylja Soviet Moscow, but in 1942 he returned to Spartak, where he served as captain. In 1951, he ended his football career.

He then had a notable career as a coach, and worked as a head coach at Spartak Moscow (1952–1954), Spartak Minsk (August 1957), Dinamo Tbilisi – 1958, Director (from the beginning to July 1960) and coach of Shakhtar Stalino (July–August 1960), director and coach of Moldova Kishinev (from October 1960 to October 1963 and August 1970 to end of 1971), and director and coach of Neftyanıka Baku (from August 1965 to July 1966). In 1954, he led the national team of the USSR, and from the beginning of June 1964 the Soviet Union youth team. He also coached the national teams of the Congo (from July 1964 to July 1965) and the national team Chad (from 1969 to May 1970). He died July 3, 1981, in Moscow.

Sokolov was champion of the USSR in 1938, 1939, USSR Championship bronze medalist in 1940, 1948, 1949, winner of the USSR Cup in 1938, 1939, 1946, 1947, 1950, and USSR Cup finalist in 1948.
