= Leonid Rumyantsev =

Russian footballer

Leonid Rumyantsev (Russian: Леонид Дмитриевич Румянцев) (23 February 1916 – 23 June 1985) was a Soviet footballer. He played for Spartak Moscow between 1935 and 1940. He was Champion of the USSR in 1936 (j), 1938, 1939, USSR Championship bronze medalist in 1936, 1940, and winner of the USSR Cup in 1938, 1939.
