= Soviet Top League =

Highest football division in Soviet Union (1936 to 1991)

Soviet Top League Высшая лига
- Founded: 22 May 1936 (as Group A)
- Folded: 1991
- Country: Soviet Union
- Confederation: UEFA
- Divisions: 1
- Number of clubs: Various
- Level on pyramid: Level 1
- Relegation to: Soviet First League
- Domestic cup(s): Soviet Cup; Soviet Super Cup (unofficial)
- League cup(s): USSR Federation Cup (1940–1990)
- International cups: European Cup; UEFA Cup Winners' Cup; UEFA Cup
- Last champions: CSKA Moscow (1991)
- Most championships: Dynamo Kyiv (13)
- Most appearances: Oleg Blokhin (432)
- Top scorer: Oleg Blokhin (211)

The Soviet Top League, known after 1970 as the Higher League (Russian: Чемпионат СССР по футболу: Высшая лига, romanized: Vyschaya Liga), served as the top division (tier) of Soviet Union football championship from 1936 until 1991.

Over the years, the league was known by several different names. Created in 1936, the tier was originally known as "Gruppa A" and was one of four tiers that comprised the All-Union football championship. Like everything in the Soviet Union, it was a state-run competition, governed by the All-Union Committee of Physical Culture (an institution of the Council of People's Commissars of the Soviet Union). The winner of the competition was honored with the title "USSR Champion" and awarded the All-Union Committee banner. In May of 1959, the Football Federation of the Soviet Union was created, which became the main governing body of football in the Soviet Union.

From its inception to its eclipse, the top tier operated in conjunction with the second tier for most of the time, allowing for participants to exchange between tiers through promotion and relegation. In 1963, a third tier was introduced. Starting from 1971, the full official name was the USSR Championship in football: Higher League. An attempt to create an independent league as an autonomously governed business entity or organization during the "perestroika" period was denied by the Federation due to the political culture in the Soviet Union.

Although the competition is considered professional, there were no professional (or commercial) sports in the Communist state due to its political stance on that issue. The teams that played in the league were composed of players who, officially, in the fiscal books, were employed and paid by the state enterprises or agencies (such as SKA or Dynamo) that the teams represented. Also, players from the state agencies' teams, SKA or Dynamo, held a rank, such as captain, lieutenant, major, etc. Also, the naming of teams was strictly controlled and had to be approved by the central government. Only after the death of Stalin were teams allowed to have names associated with their geographic location, due to the Soviet political stance on the national issue. Also, officially, teams represented so-called "voluntary" sports societies. (Voluntary Sports Societies of the Soviet Union).

After the World War II, along with the competition among the first teams, there were also conducted official competitions among reserve squads. It carried the name of "Tournament of the Doubles" (Turnir doublyorov). The reserve squads' competitions were running parallel to the first teams' competitions, normally scheduled a day prior, with relegation rules completely dependent on the league standing of their respective first team.

The Top League was one of the best football leagues in Europe, ranking second among the UEFA members in the 1988–89 season. Three of its representatives reached the finals of the European club tournaments on four occasions: FC Dynamo Kyiv, FC Dinamo Tbilisi, and FC Dynamo Moscow (all in the European Cup Winners' Cup). In the same way Russia politically succeeded the Soviet Union, UEFA considers the Russian Premier League to have succeeded the Soviet Top League.

== Overview ==
=== Introduction and popularization ===
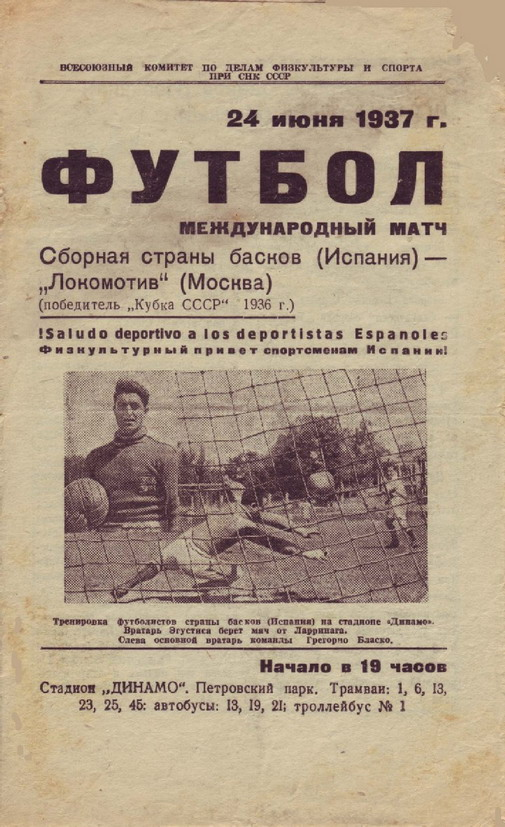
Poster for a Basque Country-Lokomotiv match on 24 June 1937

The league was established on the initiative of head of Spartak sport society, Nikolai Starostin. Starostin proposed to create eight professional club teams in six Soviet cities and hold two championship tournaments per calendar year. With minor corrections, the Soviet Council on Physical Culture accepted Starostin's proposal, creating a league of "demonstration teams of masters" which were sponsored by sport societies and factories. Nikolai Starostin de facto became a godfather of the Soviet championships. Numerous mass events took place to promote the newly established competition, among which there was an introduction of football exhibition game as part of the Moscow Physical Culture Day parade, and the invitation to the Basque Country national football team which was on the side supported by Soviet Union in the Spanish Civil War and others.

In 1936, the first secretary of Komsomol, Kosarev, came up with the idea of playing an actual football game at the Red Square as part of the Physical Culture Day parade. Stalin never attended any sports events, but the Physical Culture Day was an exclusion to the rule. The 1936 Physical Culture Day parade was directed by Russian theatre director Valentin Pluchek. For the football game, a giant green felt carpet was sewn by Spartak athletes and laid down on the Red Square's cobblestones. A night before the parade, the rug was stitched together in sections, rolled up and then stored in a vestibule of the GUM department store located at the square. Following the 1936 Red Square game, it became a tradition before the World War II and part of the Physical Culture Day parade event.

In the late 1930s Spartak was giving out thousands of tickets per game to members of the Central Committee of the All-Union Communist Party (Bolsheviks). Among serious football fans was Lavrentiy Beria who proposed to have one team from each of union republics in the league. In July 1937 a conflict erupted following a successful tour to the Soviet Union of the Basque national team during which the main governing body of sports in the country, the All-Union Council of Physical Culture, was accused by the party and Komsomol for failing the sports policy. Spartak's leadership and Starostin in particular were accused of corruption and implementing "bourgeoisie methods" in Soviet sport.

The most prominent clubs of the league were FC Dynamo Kyiv, FC Spartak Moscow, and FC Dynamo Moscow. The most popular clubs besides the above-mentioned were PFC CSKA Moscow, FC Ararat Yerevan, and FC Dinamo Tbilisi. Dinamo Tbilisi became famous for finishing third but never winning the title. They won their first title in 1964.

=== Development ===
Until the 1960s the main title contenders in the league were the Moscow clubs of Spartak and Dynamo whose dominance was disrupted for only a brief period after World War II by CSKA Moscow, nicknamed 'The team of lieutenants'. The first team that won 10 championships was Dynamo Moscow in 1963, followed by Spartak in 1979.

Eleven clubs spent over 30 seasons in the league, with five of them from Moscow. Dynamo Moscow and Dynamo Kyiv were the only clubs that participated in all seasons of the league. Among other prominent Russian clubs were SKA Rostov/Donu (Army team), Zenit Leningrad (Zenith), and Krylia Sovietov Kuibyshev (Wings of the Soviets).

Over the years, the league changed; however, from the 1970s its competition structure solidified with 16 participants, except from 1979 through 1985 when the number of participants was extended to 18.

One uniquely Soviet innovation around this time was the "draw limit", whereby a team would receive zero points for any draws above a fixed number, first 8, then 10. This rule had consequences for both the title race and relegation while it was in place. A 1973 experiment to resolve drawn games by penalty shoot-out lasted only one season.

Dynamo Kyiv's success as a Ukrainian club was supplemented in the 1980s with the appearance of Dnipro Dnipropetrovsk led by its striker Oleh Protasov, who set a new record for goals scored in a season. In 1984, Zenit Leningrad became Soviet champions for the first time.

With the unravelling of the Soviet Union in the late 1980s, the structure of the league also became unstable as more and more clubs lost interest in continuing to participate in the league, prompting several rounds of reorganisation. The main effect of these was to boost the number of Ukrainian clubs to be on par with the Russians.

Since the fall of the Soviet Union, it has been suggested that the competition be re-established along the lines of the Commonwealth of Independent States Cup, but due to a lack of interest on various levels, the venture has never been implemented.

=== Participants ===
The uneven population of the Soviet Union meant that the participants in a typical Top League season fell into three blocs. This was particularly apparent at the lower tiers of the Soviet Football Championship, such as the third tier (Vtoraya Liga), but sustained with less transparency up to the top/first tier.

- Russian clubs. Russian football was dominated by the "four-wheeled cart" of Moscow clubs: Spartak (Komsomol), Dynamo (police), CSKA (army) and Torpedo (auto workers). These four were often joined in the Top League by Lokomotiv (railroad workers), Zenit Leningrad (defense industry workers), or assorted clubs from smaller cities. Please note that although officially the Lokomotiv sports society represented "railroad workers", the Soviet Union also had an oversized number of railway troops, unlike any other country in the world. Also, "the Russian clubs' bloc" was deeply fragmented into three separate conditional sub-blocs, per se, such as Muscovite clubs, Leningrad clubs, and the RSFSR clubs (or other clubs). At the Spartakiad of the Peoples of the USSR, the Russian SFSR was always represented by three teams with Muscovite and Leningrad teams participating along with the "main" team, although the main (or first) team was always the Muscovite.
- Ukrainian clubs. Ukraine's capital Kyiv, by contrast, was the exclusive province (or "realm") of Dynamo Kyiv, who became an unofficial feeder for the Soviet national team beginning in the 1960s, replacing Dynamo Moscow. Several clubs vied to be Ukraine's "second" team over the years including Shakhtar Donetsk (coal miners), Metalist Kharkiv (defense industry workers - Dzerzhinets (armor)), Chernomorets Odesa (merchant fleet workers), Zorya Voroshilovgrad (now Zorya Luhansk, defense industry workers - Dzerzhinets (armor)) and Dnipro Dnipropetrovsk (defense industry workers - Zenit (air defense)), the last two managing to win three titles combined. Many Ukrainian clubs were also associated with the Soviet Dynamo sports society. The Soviet football authorities tried to curb or even out the Ukrainian clubs with the other clubs from the "union republics", yet there consistently existed a "separate" (or unique) competition among the Ukrainian clubs among "teams of masters" (a Soviet euphemism for professional teams).
- Other republics clubs. Lavrentiy Beria's vision of one representative club per republic was partly realised from the 1950s onwards, as in every republic except for Russia and Ukraine, fan interest and government support became concentrated into a single club based in the republic's capital city, which became "the republic's team". Most of those clubs were created as Spartak or Dynamo, supported either by the local party committee (Spartak) or the local KGB office (Dynamo). Thus Lithuania became represented by Zalgiris Vilnius, Latvia by Daugava Riga, Estonia by Kalev Tallinn, Byelorussia by Dinamo Minsk, Moldavia by Nistru Kishinev, Armenia by Ararat Yerevan, Azerbaijan by Neftchi Baku, Georgia by Dinamo Tbilisi, Kazakhstan by Kairat Alma-Ata, Uzbekistan by Pakhtakor Tashkent and Tajikistan by Pamir Dushanbe. A typical Top League season would feature 4-6 of these eleven, and Yerevan, Minsk and Tbilisi all managed to win the title at least once. Only Georgia, with Torpedo Kutaisi and later Guria Lanchkhuti, and Azerbaijan, with Dinamo Kirovabad, was ever able to have a second representative survive in the Top League in addition to their capital city club. (Turkmenistan and Kirghizia were represented in the Soviet football pyramid by Köpetdag Aşgabat and Alga Frunze respectively, but neither reached the top level.)

=== Documentation ===
Documentation about the league is scarce. Among well-known researchers are Aksel Vartanyan for Sport Express, Andrei Moroz and Georgiy Ibragimov for KLISF Club, Alexandru G.Paloşanu, Eugene Berkovich, Mike Dryomin, Almantas Lauzadis, and Hans Schöggl for RSSSF Archives. Another extensive databases are composed at helmsoccer.narod.ru and FC Dynamo Moscow website.

== Names ==
Since its creation, the Soviet Top League's name changed a quite few times:

1936–1941 Group A (Группа А)

Prior to World War II the championship was split into several groups usually of eight teams and named by the letters of the Cyrillic script.

1945–1949 The First Group of USSR (Первая группа СССР)

Upon the reestablishment of the league after the war for several years it was numbered sequentially with the top league being the First.

1950–1962 Class "A" of USSR (Класс "А" СССР)

Since 1950, the alphabetical classification of the Soviet league hierarchy has resumed. In 1960 through 1962 the league consisted of two groups with the better clubs qualified for the championship pool and less fortunate – the relegation pool.

1963–1969 The First Group "A" of USSR (Первая группа "А" СССР)

== European representation ==
The first time the Soviet League was represented in Europe in the 1965–66 European Cup Winners' Cup by Dynamo Kyiv. In its first year, the club reached the quarterfinals, eliminating on its way Coleraine and Rosenborg and winning all four matches against those clubs. The Ukrainians also knocked out reigning champions Celtic in the first round in the 1967–68 European Cup. In the 1968–69 season, the Soviet clubs withdrew from continental competitions after the Soviet invasion of Czechoslovakia. In 1972 came the first success of the Soviet club football when Dynamo Moscow reached the finals, but were defeated by Glasgow Rangers at Camp Nou in Barcelona.

From 1974 (except for the 1982–83 season) to 1984, the league was among the best 10 national competitions in the UEFA rankings (based on continental competitions performance), reaching the 4th place in 1976 and 1977. From 1985, the Soviet Top League was among the best four in Europe, until the collapse of the Soviet Union in 1991.

In 1987 and 1988, the Soviet Top League was the second-best in Europe; however, close to the collapse of the Soviet Union, the results of its football clubs that it represented worsened as top players could now leave and play for foreign leagues in the West. The very last coefficient position that the Soviet League placed was No. 9 in 1992. In the 1992/93 season, all the results of the Soviet League were transferred to the Russian Premier League. Throughout its history, the representatives of the league on four occasions made it to the finals of the three primary European competitions and were victorious in three. Once, a Soviet club was able to win the UEFA Super Cup.

== Football championship among city teams (1923–1935) ==
Before the establishment of professional competitions among clubs, in the Soviet Union existed another competition that was conducted among collective teams of various cities or republics. In 1923 and 1924, competitions were part of the All-Union Festival of Physical Culture. In 1928 and 1931, competitions were part of the All-Union qualification for the "Workers' Spartakiad" that was organized by the Red Sport International. In 1935, competitions were organized in two tiers.

Season	Champion	Runner-up	3rd Position	Top Goalscorer
1923	Moscow	Southern Railways (Kharkiv)	Kolomna / Irkutsk	
1924	Kharkiv	Petrograd	Transcaucasian SFSR	
no competitions in 1925–27
1928	Moscow	Ukrainian SSR	Belarusian SSR	
no competitions in 1929–30
1931	Russian SFSR	Transcaucasian SFSR	Ukrainian SSR	
1932	Moscow	Leningrad	Kharkiv / Donbass	Vasily Smirnov (Moscow, 4 goals)
no competitions in 1933–34
1935	Moscow	Leningrad	Kharkiv	Mikhail Yakushin (Moscow, 6 goals)

== Champions and top goalscorers ==
Bold text in the "Champion" column denotes that the club also won the Soviet Cup during the same season. The italicized text in the table indicates the other cup champions that made it the Soviet top-3.

=== Group A ===
Season	Champion	Runner-up	3rd Position	Top Goalscorer
1936 (spring)	Dynamo Moscow	Dynamo Kyiv	Spartak Moscow	Mikhail Semichastny (Dynamo Moscow, 6 goals)
1936 (autumn)	Spartak Moscow	Dynamo Moscow	Dinamo Tbilisi	Georgy Glazkov (Spartak Moscow, 7 goals)
1937	Dynamo Moscow (2)	Spartak Moscow	Dynamo Kyiv	Boris Paichadze (Dinamo Tbilisi, 8 goals); Leonid Rumyantsev (Spartak Moscow, 8 goals); Vasily Smirnov (Dynamo Moscow, 8 goals)
1938	Spartak Moscow (2)	CSKA Moscow	Metallurg Moscow	Makar Honcharenko (Dinamo Kyiv, 19 goals)
1939	Spartak Moscow (3)	Dinamo Tbilisi	CSKA Moscow	Grigory Fedotov (CSKA Moscow, 21 goals)
1940	Dynamo Moscow (3)	Dinamo Tbilisi	Spartak Moscow	Grigory Fedotov (CSKA Moscow, 21 goals); Sergei Solovyov (Dynamo Moscow, 21 goals)
1941	Cancelled on 24 June due to World War II (Dynamo Moscow had the best record at that time)			
1942–44	Cancelled due to World War II			

Performance by club

Club	Winners	Runners-up	3rd Position	Years won
Spartak Moscow	3	1	2	1936a, 1938, 1939
Dynamo Moscow	3	1		1936s, 1937, 1940
Dinamo Tbilisi		2	1	
CSKA Moscow		1	1	
Dynamo Kyiv		1	1	
Metallurg Moscow			1	

=== First group ===
Season	Champion	Runner-up	3rd Position	Top Goalscorer
1945	Dynamo Moscow (4)	CSKA Moscow	Torpedo Moscow	Vsevolod Bobrov (CSKA Moscow, 24 goals)
1946	CSKA Moscow	Dynamo Moscow	Dinamo Tbilisi	Aleksandr Ponomaryov (Torpedo Moscow, 18 goals)
1947	CSKA Moscow (2)	Dynamo Moscow	Dinamo Tbilisi	Vsevolod Bobrov (CSKA Moscow, 14 goals); Valentin Nikolayev (CSKA Moscow, 14 goals); Sergei Solovyov (Dynamo Moscow, 14 goals)
1948	CSKA Moscow (3)	Dynamo Moscow	Spartak Moscow	Sergei Solovyov (Dynamo Moscow, 25 goals)
1949	Dynamo Moscow (5)	CSKA Moscow	Spartak Moscow	Nikita Simonyan (Spartak Moscow, 26 goals)

Performance by club

Club	Winners	Runners-up	3rd Position	Years won
CSKA Moscow	3	2		1946, 1947, 1948
Dynamo Moscow	2	3		1945, 1949
Dinamo Tbilisi			2	
Spartak Moscow			2	
Torpedo Moscow			1	

=== Class A ===
Season	Champion	Runner-up	3rd position	Top goalscorer
1950	CSKA Moscow (4)	Dynamo Moscow	Dinamo Tbilisi	Nikita Simonyan (Spartak Moscow, 34 goals)
1951	CSKA Moscow (5)	Dinamo Tbilisi	Shakhtar Stalino	Avtandil Gogoberidze (Dinamo Tbilisi, 16 goals)
1952	Spartak Moscow (4)	Dynamo Kyiv	Dynamo Moscow	Andrey Zazroyev (Dynamo Kyiv, 11 goals)
1953	Spartak Moscow (5)	Dinamo Tbilisi	Torpedo Moscow	Nikita Simonyan (Spartak Moscow, 14 goals)
1954	Dynamo Moscow (6)	Spartak Moscow	Spartak Minsk	Anatoli Ilyin (Spartak Moscow, 11 goals); Vladimir Ilyin (Dynamo Moscow, 11 goals); Antonin Sochnev (Trudovye Reservy Leningrad, 11 goals)
1955	Dynamo Moscow (7)	Spartak Moscow	CSKA Moscow	Eduard Streltsov (Torpedo Moscow, 15 goals)
1956	Spartak Moscow (6)	Dynamo Moscow	CSKA Moscow	Vasily Buzunov (ODO Sverdlovsk, 17 goals)
1957	Dynamo Moscow (8)	Torpedo Moscow	Spartak Moscow	Vasily Buzunov (CSKA Moscow, 16 goals)
1958	Spartak Moscow (7)	Dynamo Moscow	CSKA Moscow	Anatoli Ilyin (Spartak Moscow, 19 goals)
1959	Dynamo Moscow (9)	Lokomotiv Moscow	Dinamo Tbilisi	Zaur Kaloyev (Dinamo Tbilisi, 16 goals)
1960	Torpedo Moscow	Dynamo Kyiv	Dynamo Moscow	Zaur Kaloyev (Dinamo Tbilisi, 20 goals); Gennady Gusarov (Torpedo Moscow, 20 goals)
1961	Dynamo Kyiv	Torpedo Moscow	Spartak Moscow	Gennady Gusarov (Torpedo Moscow, 22 goals)
1962	Spartak Moscow (8)	Dynamo Moscow	Dinamo Tbilisi	Mikhail Mustygin (Belarus Minsk, 17 goals)

Performance by club

Club	Winners	Runners-up	3rd Position	Years won
Spartak Moscow	5	2	2	1952, 1953, 1956, 1958, 1962
Dynamo Moscow	4	4	2	1954, 1955, 1957, 1959
CSKA Moscow	2		3	1950, 1951
Torpedo Moscow	1	2	1	1960
Dynamo Kyiv	1	2		1961
Dinamo Tbilisi		2	3	
Lokomotiv Moscow		1		
Shakhtar Stalino			1	
Spartak Minsk			1	

=== Class A (1st Group) ===
Season	Champion	Runner-up	3rd Position	Top Goalscorer
1963	Dynamo Moscow (10)	Spartak Moscow	Dinamo Minsk	Oleg Kopayev (SKA Rostov-on-Don, 27 goals)
1964	Dinamo Tbilisi	Torpedo Moscow	CSKA Moscow	Vladimir Fedotov (CSKA Moscow, 16 goals)
1965	Torpedo Moscow (2)	Dynamo Kyiv	CSKA Moscow	Oleg Kopayev (SKA Rostov-on-Don, 18 goals)
1966	Dynamo Kyiv (2)	SKA Rostov-on-Don	Neftyanik Baku	Ilya Datunashvili (Dinamo Tbilisi, 20 goals)
1967	Dynamo Kyiv (3)	Dynamo Moscow	Dinamo Tbilisi	Mikhail Mustygin (Dinamo Minsk, 19 goals)
1968	Dynamo Kyiv (4)	Spartak Moscow	Torpedo Moscow	Georgi Gavasheli (Dinamo Tbilisi, 22 goals); Berador Abduraimov (Pakhtakor Tashkent, 22 goals)
1969	Spartak Moscow (9)	Dynamo Kyiv	Dinamo Tbilisi	Nikolai Osyanin (Spartak Moscow, 16 goals); Vladimir Proskurin (SKA Rostov-on-Don, 16 goals); Dzhemal Kherhadze (Torpedo Kutaisi, 16 goals)

=== Class A (Top Group) ===
Season	Champion	Runner-up	3rd Position	Top Goalscorer
1970	CSKA Moscow (6)	Dynamo Moscow	Spartak Moscow	Givi Nodia (Dinamo Tbilisi, 17 goals)

=== Top League ===
Season	Champion	Runner-up	3rd Position	Top Goalscorer
1971	Dynamo Kyiv (5)	Ararat Yerevan	Dinamo Tbilisi	Eduard Malofeyev (Dinamo Minsk, 16 goals)
1972	Zorya Voroshilovgrad	Dynamo Kyiv	Dinamo Tbilisi	Oleg Blokhin (Dynamo Kyiv, 14 goals)
1973	Ararat Yerevan	Dynamo Kyiv	Dynamo Moscow	Oleg Blokhin (Dynamo Kyiv, 18 goals)
1974	Dynamo Kyiv (6)	Spartak Moscow	Chornomorets Odesa	Oleg Blokhin (Dynamo Kyiv, 20 goals)
1975	Dynamo Kyiv (7)	Shakhtar Donetsk	Dynamo Moscow	Oleg Blokhin (Dynamo Kyiv, 18 goals)
1976 (spring)	Dynamo Moscow (11)	Ararat Yerevan	Dinamo Tbilisi	Arkady Andreasyan (Ararat Yerevan, 8 goals)
1976 (autumn)	Torpedo Moscow (3)	Dynamo Kyiv	Dinamo Tbilisi	Aleksandr Markin (Zenit Leningrad, 13 goals)
1977	Dynamo Kyiv (8)	Dinamo Tbilisi	Torpedo Moscow	Oleg Blokhin (Dynamo Kyiv, 17 goals)
1978	Dinamo Tbilisi (2)	Dynamo Kyiv	Shakhtar Donetsk	Georgi Yartsev (Spartak Moscow, 19 goals)
1979	Spartak Moscow (10)	Shakhtar Donetsk	Dynamo Kyiv	Vitali Starukhin (Shakhtar Donetsk, 26 goals)
1980	Dynamo Kyiv (9)	Spartak Moscow	Zenit Leningrad	Sergey Andreyev (SKA Rostov-on-Don, 20 goals)
1981	Dynamo Kyiv (10)	Spartak Moscow	Dinamo Tbilisi	Ramaz Shengelia (Dinamo Tbilisi, 23 goals)
1982	Dinamo Minsk	Dynamo Kyiv	Spartak Moscow	Andrei Yakubik (Pakhtakor Tashkent, 23 goals)
1983	Dnipro Dnipropetrovsk	Spartak Moscow	Dinamo Minsk	Yuri Gavrilov (Spartak Moscow, 18 goals)
1984	Zenit Leningrad	Spartak Moscow	Dnipro Dnipropetrovsk	Sergey Andreyev (SKA Rostov-on-Don, 20 goals)
1985	Dynamo Kyiv (11)	Spartak Moscow	Dnipro Dnipropetrovsk	Oleg Protasov (Dnipro Dnipropetrovsk, 35 goals)
1986	Dynamo Kyiv (12)	Dynamo Moscow	Spartak Moscow	Aleksandr Borodyuk (Dynamo Moscow, 21 goals)
1987	Spartak Moscow (11)	Dnipro Dnipropetrovsk	Žalgiris Vilnius	Oleg Protasov (Dnipro Dnipropetrovsk, 18 goals)
1988	Dnipro Dnipropetrovsk (2)	Dynamo Kyiv	Torpedo Moscow	Yevhen Shakhov (Dnipro Dnipropetrovsk, 16 goals); Aleksandr Borodyuk (Dynamo Moscow, 16 goals)
1989	Spartak Moscow (12)	Dnipro Dnipropetrovsk	Dynamo Kyiv	Sergey Rodionov (Spartak Moscow, 16 goals)
1990	Dynamo Kyiv (13)	CSKA Moscow	Dynamo Moscow	Oleg Protasov (Dynamo Kyiv, 12 goals); Valery Shmarov (Spartak Moscow, 12 goals)
1991	CSKA Moscow (7)	Spartak Moscow	Torpedo Moscow	Igor Kolyvanov (Dynamo Moscow, 18 goals)

== Overall statistics ==
=== Performance by club's first teams ===
Club	Winners	Runners-up	Third places	Years won
(Ukrainian Soviet Socialist Republic) Dynamo Kyiv	13	11	3	1961, 1966, 1967, 1968, 1971, 1974, 1975, 1977, 1980, 1981, 1985, 1986, 1990
(Russian Soviet Federative Socialist Republic) Spartak Moscow	12	12	9	1936 (a), 1938, 1939, 1952, 1953, 1956, 1958, 1962, 1969, 1979, 1987, 1989
(Russian Soviet Federative Socialist Republic) Dynamo Moscow	11	11	5	1936 (s), 1937, 1940, 1945, 1949, 1954, 1955, 1957, 1959, 1963, 1976 (s)
(Russian Soviet Federative Socialist Republic) CSKA Moscow	7	4	6	1946, 1947, 1948, 1950, 1951, 1970, 1991
(Russian Soviet Federative Socialist Republic) Torpedo Moscow	3	3	6	1960, 1965, 1976 (a)
(Georgian Soviet Socialist Republic) Dinamo Tbilisi	2	5	13	1964, 1978
(Ukrainian Soviet Socialist Republic) Dnipro Dnipropetrovsk	2	2	2	1983, 1988
(Armenian Soviet Socialist Republic) Ararat Yerevan	1	2	–	1973
(Byelorussian Soviet Socialist Republic) Dinamo Minsk	1	–	3	1982
(Russian Soviet Federative Socialist Republic) Zenit Leningrad	1	–	1	1984
(Ukrainian Soviet Socialist Republic) Zorya Voroshilovgrad	1	–	–	1972
(Ukrainian Soviet Socialist Republic) Shakhtar Donetsk	–	2	2	–
(Russian Soviet Federative Socialist Republic) Lokomotiv Moscow	–	1	–	–
(Russian Soviet Federative Socialist Republic) SKA Rostov-on-Don	–	1	–	–
(Russian Soviet Federative Socialist Republic) Serp i Molot Moscow	–	–	1	–
(Azerbaijan Soviet Socialist Republic) Neftchi Baku	–	–	1	
(Ukrainian Soviet Socialist Republic) Chornomorets Odesa	–	–	1	–
(Lithuanian Soviet Socialist Republic) Žalgiris Vilnius	–	–	1	–
Total	54	54	54	

=== Performance by republic ===
Republic	Winners	Runners-up	Third places	Appearances	Number of representing clubs	Winning clubs
Russian SFSR	34	32	28	416	31	Spartak Moscow (12); Dynamo Moscow (11); CSKA Moscow (7); Torpedo Moscow (3); Zenit Leningrad (1)
Ukrainian SSR	16	15	8	191	15	Dynamo Kyiv (13); Dnipro Dnipropetrovsk (2); Zorya Voroshilovgrad (1)
Georgian SSR	2	5	13	68	5	Dinamo Tbilisi (2)
Armenian SSR	1	2	–	33	1	Ararat Yerevan (1)
Byelorussian SSR	1	–	3	39	1	Dinamo Minsk (1)
Azerbaijan SSR	–	–	1	29	3	
Lithuanian SSR	–	–	1	11	1	
Kazakh SSR	–	–	–	24	1	
Uzbek SSR	–	–	–	22	1	
Moldavian SSR	–	–	–	7	1	
Latvian SSR	–	–	–	7	1	
Tajik SSR	–	–	–	3	1	
Estonian SSR	–	–	–	2	1	
Total	54	54	54			

The republics that were never represented at the top level were the Turkmen SSR and the Kyrgyz SSR. Also, in Soviet football Russian SFSR teams were technically represented by three different entities with Moscow and Leningrad as the Union federal cities teams considered separately from the rest of Russian teams.

=== All-time table ===
Team	Republic	Seasons	First season	Last season	Played	Won	Drawn	Lost	Goals for	Goals against	Points^{1}	1st	2nd	3rd
Spartak Moscow	Russia	53	1936	1991	1453	722	385	346	2483	1467	1821	12	12	9
Dynamo Kyiv	Ukraine	54	1936	1991	1483	681	456	346	2306	1566	1810	13	11	3
Dinamo Moscow	Russia	54	1936	1991	1485	707	404	374	2435	1457	1805	11	11	5
Dinamo Tbilisi	Georgia	51	1936	1989	1424	621	406	397	2176	1677	1642	2	5	13
Torpedo Moscow	Russia	51	1938	1991	1455	601	433	421	2059	1656	1613	3	3	6
CSKA Moscow	Russia	48	1936	1991	1326	585	363	378	2030	1451	1524	7	4	6
Zenit Leningrad	Russia	49	1938	1989	1402	464	411	527	1725	1914	1328	1	-	1
Shakhter Donetsk	Ukraine	44	1938	1991	1288	434	379	475	1522	1641	1241	-	2	2
Dinamo Minsk (Spartak Minsk)	Belarus	33	1945	1991	1053	342	319	392	1162	1297	989	1	-	3
Ararat Yerevan	Armenia	33	1949	1991	1026	352	280	394	1150	1306	972	1	2	-
Lokomotiv Moscow	Russia	38	1936	1991	1001	303	289	409	1218	1431	888	-	1	-
Neftchi Baku	Azerbaijan	27	1949	1988	884	253	270	361	907	1141	771	-	-	1
Chernomorets Odesa	Ukraine	24	1965	1991	738	244	217	277	777	884	699	-	-	1
Kairat Almata	Kazakhstan	24	1960	1988	780	226	234	320	742	983	678	-	-	-
Pakhtakor Tashkent	Uzbekistan	22	1960	1991	722	212	211	299	805	1035	629	-	-	-
SKA Rostov-on-Don	Russia	21	1959	1985	680	218	194	268	843	911	620	-	1	-
Dnipro Dnipropetrovsk	Ukraine	19	1972	1991	554	227	154	173	729	634	604	2	2	2
Krylya Sovetov Kuybyshev	Russia	26	1946	1979	715	185	209	321	675	996	579	-	-	-
Metallist Kharkiv	Ukraine	14	1960	1991	438	133	124	181	413	530	390	-	-	-
Zorya Voroshilovgrad	Ukraine	14	1967	1979	412	125	135	152	416	469	377	1	-	-
Dynamo Leningrad	Russia	17	1936	1963	397	135	102	160	589	649	372	-	-	-
Torpedo Kutaisi	Georgia	13	1962	1986	439	104	129	206	395	655	335	-	-	-
Žalgiris Vilnius	Lithuania	11	1953	1989	330	107	93	130	349	463	305	-	-	1
Rotor Volgograd	Russia	11	1938	1990	293	91	66	136	352	488	248	-	-	-
Nistru Chişinău	Moldova	11	1956	1983	312	69	84	159	312	534	222	-	-	-
Karpaty Lviv	Ukraine	9	1971	1980	244	68	85	91	250	301	218	-	-	-
VVS Moscow	Russia	6	1947	1952	161	58	32	71	235	270	148	-	-	-
Daugava Riga	Latvia	7	1949	1962	203	51	48	104	198	311	150	-	-	-
Krylya Sovetov Moscow	Russia	6	1938	1948	143	32	39	72	145	259	103	-	-	-
Metallurg Moscow	Russia	4	1937	1940	91	40	17	34	173	170	97	-	-	1
Lokomotiv Kharkiv	Ukraine	4	1949	1954	34	23	57	47	112	176	91	-	-	-
Kuban Krasnodar	Russia	3	1980	1982	102	29	26	47	111	145	84	-	-	-
Admiralteyets Leningrad	Russia	3	1958	1961	84	26	17	41	122	149	69	-	-	-
Pamir Dushanbe	Tajikistan	3	1989	1991	84	21	27	36	74	104	69	-	-	-
Elektrik Leningrad	Russia	5	1936	1939	80	22	18	40	112	163	62	-	-	-
Fakel Voronezh	Russia	2	1961	1985	66	20	17	29	63	83	57	-	-	-
Trudovye Rezervy Leningrad	Russia	3	1954	1956	68	16	23	29	82	113	55	-	-	-
Volga Gorky	Russia	3	1951	1964	85	14	27	44	58	143	55	-	-	-
Spartak Tbilisi	Georgia	2	1950	1951	64	21	11	32	82	109	53	-	-	-
Spartak Vladikavkaz	Russia	2	1970	1991	62	16	16	30	64	89	48	-	-	-
Dinamo Odesa	Ukraine	2	1938	1939	51	16	13	22	64	102	45	-	-	-
SKA Odesa	Ukraine	2	1965	1966	68	4	19	45	38	121	27	-	-	-
Metallurg Zaporizhya	Ukraine	1	1991	1991	30	9	7	14	27	38	25	-	-	-
VMS Moscow	Russia	1	1951	1951	28	7	9	12	30	50	23	-	-	-
Tavriya Simferopol	Ukraine	1	1981	1981	34	8	7	19	27	54	23	-	-	-
Selmash Kharkiv	Ukraine	1	1938	1938	25	8	6	11	34	45	22	-	-	-
Uralmash Sverdlovsk	Russia	1	1969	1969	34	7	8	19	19	39	22	-	-	-
Stalinets Moscow	Russia	1	1938	1938	25	8	5	12	36	44	21	-	-	-
Lokomotyv Kyiv	Ukraine	1	1938	1938	25	8	5	12	43	64	21	-	-	-
Shinnik Yaroslavl	Russia	1	1964	1964	32	6	9	17	20	48	21	-	-	-
Dynamo Rostov-on-Don	Russia	1	1938	1938	25	7	6	12	39	43	20	-	-	-
Temp Baku	Azerbaijan	1	1938	1938	25	6	8	11	33	40	20	-	-	-
Spartak Leningrad	Russia	1	1938	1938	25	6	8	11	30	39	20	-	-	-
Kalev Tallinn	Estonia	2	1960	1961	58	3	14	41	46	146	20	-	-	-
Dynamo Kirovabad	Azerbaijan	1	1968	1968	38	5	9	24	25	59	19	-	-	-
Guria Lanchkhuti	Georgia	1	1987	1987	30	5	8	17	18	38	18	-	-	-
Spartak Kharkiv	Ukraine	1	1938	1938	25	5	7	13	43	63	17	-	-	-
Zenit (Bolshevik) Leningrad	Russia	1	1938	1938	25	7	3	15	35	57	17	-	-	-
ODO Sverdlovsk	Russia	1	1956	1956	22	6	4	12	31	45	16	-	-	-
Pishchevik Moscow	Russia	1	1938	1938	25	5	6	14	25	53	16	-	-	-
Lokomotivi Tbilisi	Georgia	1	1938	1938	25	5	5	15	44	62	15	-	-	-
Kalinin city team	Russia	1	1952	1952	13	5	4	4	19	19	14	-	-	-
Burevestnik Moscow	Russia	1	1938	1938	25	4	4	17	28	87	12	-	-	-

^{1}Two points for a win. In 1973, a point for a draw was awarded only to a team that won the subsequent penalty shootout. In 1978–1988, the number of draws for which points were awarded was limited.

== Best coaches ==
Place	Name	Medals			Champion clubs
Place	Name	gold	silver	bronze	Champion clubs
1	Valeriy Lobanovsky	7	4	2	Dynamo Kyiv
2	Mikhail Yakushin	6	6	1	Dynamo Moscow
3	Boris Arkadiev	6	2	2	CSKA Moscow (5), Dynamo Moscow (1)
4	Viktor Maslov	4	4	-	Dynamo Kyiv (3), Torpedo Moscow (1)
5	Nikita Simonyan	3	2	2	Spartak Moscow (2), Ararat Yerevan (1)
6	Konstantin Beskov	2	7	2	Spartak Moscow
7	Aleksandr Sevidov	2	2	2	Dynamo Kyiv (1), Dynamo Moscow (1)
8-9	Nikolay Gulyayev	2	2	1	Spartak Moscow
8-9	Konstantin Kvashnin	2	2	1	Spartak Moscow (1), Dynamo Moscow (1)
10-11	Vasily Sokolov	2	1	-	Spartak Moscow
10-11	Pavel Sadyrin	2	1	-	Zenit Leningrad (1), CSKA Moscow (1)

Notes:

- Clubs are shown those with which the listed coaches made the top-3, i.e. Beskov won two Top league titles and all with Spartak, but he also managed Dynamo with which he was a league runner-up.

== Awards and prizes ==
Starting since 1958 beside medals of the regular Soviet championship, participants were awarded number of prizes (~ 18 regular prizes) that were established by various sports and public organizations, editorial offices of newspapers and magazines.

a prize that had different name and created by someone else
a prize that was superseded by another
brief-lasting awards, less than 5 seasons

Prize	Creator	Years
The best footballer of the Year	"Futbol" weekly	1964—1991
The best goalie of the Year	"Ogonyok" magazine	1960—1991
The best topscorer	"Trud" newspaper	1958—1991
The Knight of the Attack	"Sovetskiy voin" magazine	1984—1991
Loyalty to the club	"Prapor kommunizma" Kyiv newspaper	1986—1989
The best debutant of the season	"Smena" magazine	1964—1975
The best newcomer	"Sportivnye igry" magazine	1986—1991
To the attack setter	"Stroitelnaya gazeta"	1988—1989
With both squads	Football Federation (Section) of the Soviet Union	1958—1991
Commemorative Prize of Grigoriy Fedotov	CSKA	1958—1991
For the fair play	"Sovetskiy sport" newspaper	1958—1969
Fair Play	"Chelovek i zakon" magazine	1974—1991
The big score	"Futbol" weekly	1961—1991
For the will to victory	"Sovetskaya Rossiya" newspaper	1962—1991
For the best difference in goals	"Start" Ukrainian magazine	1966—1991
The challenging guest	"Komsomolskoye znamya" Kyiv newspaper	1966—1991
The trouble for the elites (Note: Fear-striker to the famed (favourites))	"Sportivnaya Moskva" weekly	1976—1991
Honor to the flag	Alma-Ata newspaper "Leninskaya smena"	1969—1978
Cup of the progress	Kyiv "Rabochaya gazeta"	1971—1991
Together with a team	Presidium of the Football Federation of sport societies trade unions	1978—1990
The First height	Newspaper "Sotsialisticheskaya industriya"	1983—1991
For nobility and courage	Leningrad magazine "Avrora"	1987—1989
For the most beautiful goal of the season	Newspaper "Moskovskiy komsomolets" television program "Futbolnoye obozreniye"	1964—1991

== Soviet football championship among reserves ==
Season	Champion	Runner-up	3rd Position	Top Goalscorer
1945	Dinamo Moscow (1)	?	?	
1946	Spartak Moscow (1)	Dinamo Tbilisi	Dinamo Moscow	
1947	CSKA Moscow (1)	Dinamo Moscow	Dinamo Kyiv	
1948	CSKA Moscow (2)	Spartak Moscow	VVS Moscow	
1949	Dinamo Kyiv (1)	CSKA Moscow	Spartak Moscow	
1950	CDKA Moscow (3)	VVS Moscow	Spartak Moscow	
1951	CDKA Moscow (4)	Dinamo Moscow	VVS Moscow	
1952	Dinamo Moscow (2)	Dinamo Kyiv	Krylia Sovetov Kuibyshev	
1953	Spartak Moscow (2)	Lokomotiv Moscow	Dinamo Kyiv	
1954	Spartak Moscow (3)	CDSA Moscow	Lokomotiv Moscow	
1955	Spartak Moscow (4)	Dinamo Tbilisi	CDSA Moscow	
1956	Spartak Moscow (5)	Dinamo Moscow	Lokomotiv Moscow	
1957	Dinamo Moscow (3)	Spartak Moscow	CSK MO Moscow	
1958	Spartak Moscow (6)	Dinamo Moscow	Zenit Leningrad	
1959	Torpedo Moscow (1)	CSK MO Moscow	Spartak Moscow	
1960	CSKA Moscow (5)	Dinamo Moscow	Dinamo Kyiv	
1961	Spartak Moscow (7)	SKA Rostov-na-Donu	Dinamo Kyiv	
1962	Spartak Moscow (8)	Dinamo Kyiv	Dinamo Moscow	
1963	Dinamo Kyiv (2)	CSKA Moscow	Dinamo Tbilisi	
1964	Dinamo Tbilisi (1)	Dinamo Kyiv	CSKA Moscow	
1965	Dinamo Kyiv (3)	Lokomotiv Moscow	CSKA Moscow	
1966	Dinamo Kyiv (4)	Dinamo Tbilisi	Neftchi Baku	
1967	Shakhter Donetsk (1)	Dinamo Kyiv	Dinamo Moscow	
1968	Dinamo Kyiv (5)	Shakhter Donetsk	Dinamo Moscow	
1969	Shakhter Donetsk (2)	Dinamo Moscow	CSKA Moscow	
1970	Dinamo Moscow (4)	Spartak Moscow	CSKA Moscow	
1971	Dinamo Moscow (5)	SKA Rostov-na-Donu	CSKA Moscow	
1972	Dinamo Kyiv (6)	Torpedo Moscow	Karpaty Lviv	
1973	FC Ararat Yerevan (1)	Kairat Alma-Ata	CSKA Moscow	
1974	Dinamo Kyiv (7)	Dinamo Moscow	Chernomorets Odesa	
1975	Torpedo Moscow (2)	Spartak Moscow	Dinamo Kyiv	
1976	Dinamo Kyiv (8)	Shakhter Donetsk	Karpaty Lviv	
1977	Dinamo Kyiv (9)	Shakhter Donetsk	Torpedo Moscow	
1978	Dinamo Tbilisi (2)	CSKA Moscow	Dinamo Kyiv	
1979	CSKA Moscow (6)	Neftchi Baku	Dinamo Kyiv	
1980	Dinamo Kyiv (10)	Dinamo Moscow	Spartak Moscow	
1981	Dinamo Kyiv (11)	Dinamo Tbilisi	Zenit Leningrad	
1982	Dinamo Kyiv (12)	Spartak Moscow	Dinamo Minsk	
1983	Dinamo Kyiv (13)	CSKA Moscow	Dinamo Moscow	
1984	Dnepr Dnepropetrovsk (1)	Dinamo Kyiv	Dinamo Tbilisi	
1985	Dinamo Kyiv (14)	Spartak Moscow	Torpedo Moscow	
1986	Spartak Moscow (9)	Dnepr Dnepropetrovsk	Dinamo Kyiv	
1987	Dnepr Dnepropetrovsk (2)	Spartak Moscow	Zalgiris Vilnius	
1988	Dinamo Moscow (7)	Dinamo Kyiv	Spartak Moscow	
1989	Dinamo Minsk (1)	Spartak Moscow	Dnepr Dnepropetrovsk	
1990	Dinamo Kyiv (15)	Dnepr Dnepropetrovsk	Spartak Moscow	
1991	Dnepr Dnepropetrovsk (3)	Dinamo Minsk	Spartak Moscow	
