= Anatoly Akimov (footballer) =

Soviet footballer

- Born: Anatoly Mikhaylovich Akimov; April 6, 1915; Moscow, Russian Empire
- Died: 10 August 1984 (aged 69); Moscow, USSR
- Resting place: Vagankovo Cemetery
- Spouse: Natalia Petukhova

Anatoly Mikhaylovich Akimov (Russian: Анато́лий Миха́йлович Аки́мов; April 6, 1915, Moscow, Russian Empire – August 10, 1984, Moscow, RSFSR, USSR) was a Soviet football goalkeeper. Honored Master of Sports of the USSR (1940), Honored coach of the RSFSR (1963). Player Team Moscow. Head coach of the Democratic Republic of Vietnam (1958-1960).

From 1931to 35, he played handball, was the champion of Moscow, and was a member of the Moscow team.

He was awarded the Order of the Badge of Honour in 1937.

His wife was Natalia Peukhova, a famous Soviet athlete and champion of the USSR.

He is buried at the Vagankovo Cemetery.

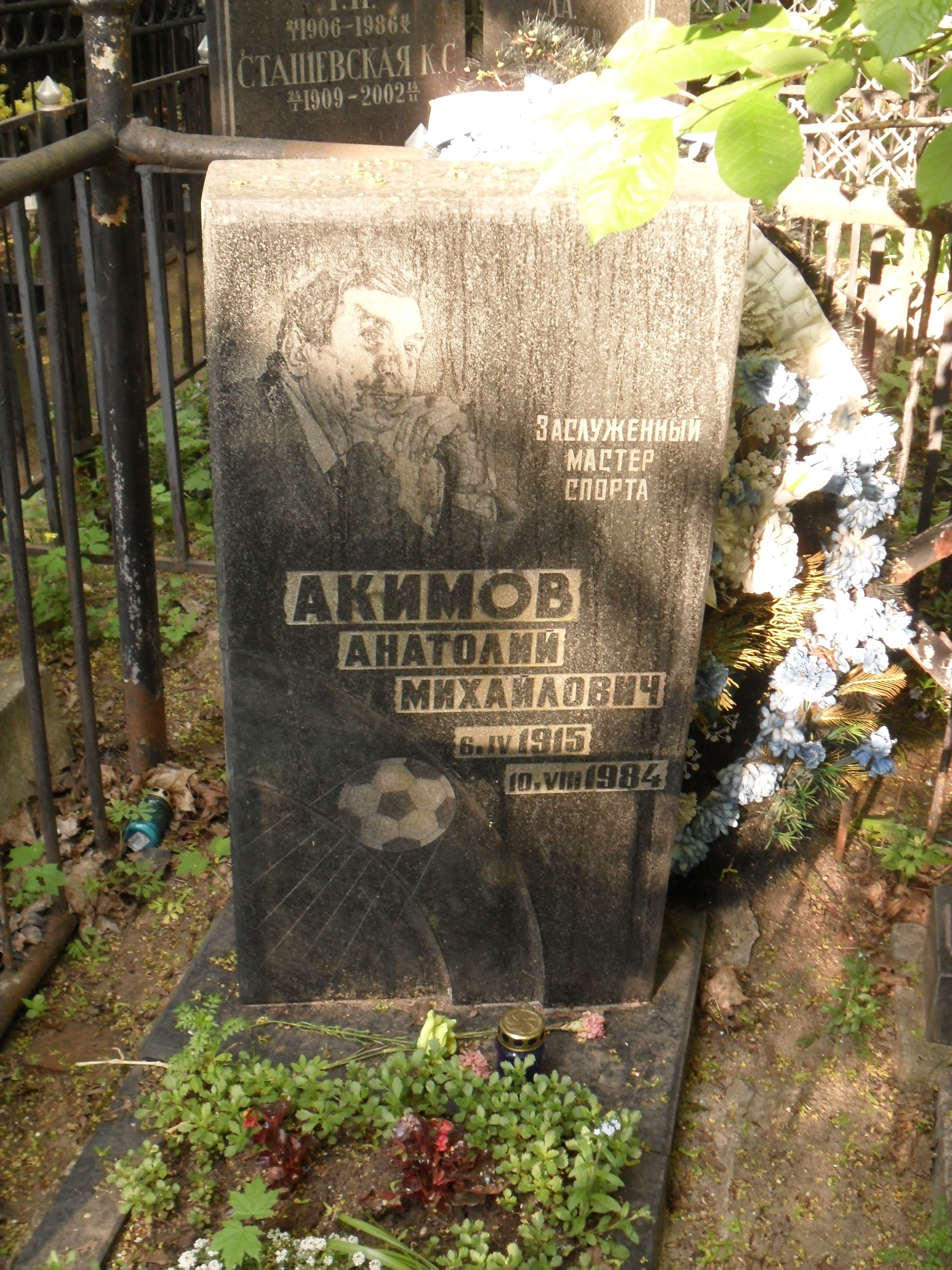
Grave on the Vagankovo Cemetery
