= Georgy Glazkov =

Russian footballer and coach

Georgy Glazkov (Russian: Георгий Фёдорович Глазков) (18 November 1911 – 18 November 1968) was a Soviet football player and coach who played as a forward.

== Career ==
Glazkov spent much of his playing career between 1935 and 1947 at Spartak Moscow although during the Great Patriotic War in 1941 played for Zenit Moscow and MVO Moscow in 1945.

At the end of the football career he began a career as coach. In the years 1948-1951 he led Spartak Vilnius, and from June to the end of 1951 managed Spartak Moscow. From 1953 to June 1954 he trained Metalurh Zaporizhzhia. In 1955 he helped to train the second team of the USSR. From 1955-1959 he held a position of the National Football Coach of the Department of Sports Committee of the USSR. In 1959, he became a coach of the USSR national team and in 1964 he led the youth team of the USSR. In the years 1963-1968 he also worked as a senior coach at FSzM Moscow. He died on 18 November 1968 in Moscow.

Glazkov was champion of the USSR in 1936 (junior), 1938, 1939, USSR Championship bronze medalist in 1936, 1940, winner of the USSR Cup in 1938, 1939, 1946, 1947 and USSR Cup finalist in 1945. He was also bronze medalist in the First Division of the USSR in 1949 and 1950 as a coach.
