= 1971 Soviet Cup =

1971 Cup of USSR in Football
Кубок СССР

Tournament details
- Country: Soviet Union
- Dates: March 6 – August 8
- Teams: 38

Final positions
- Champions: Spartak Moscow
- Runners-up: SKA Rostov-on-Don

The 1971 Soviet Cup was an association football cup competition of the Soviet Union. The winner of the competition, Spartak Moscow qualified for the continental tournament.

== Participating teams ==
Enter in First round		Enter in Qualification round
Vysshaya Liga 16/16 teams	Pervaya Liga 10/22 teams	Pervaya Liga 12/22 teams
✓ Dinamo Kiev; ✓ Ararat Yerevan; ✓ Dinamo Tbilisi; ✓ Zaria Voroshilovgrad; ✓ Dinamo Moscow; ✓ Spartak Moscow; ✓ Torpedo Moscow; ✓ Kairat Alma-Ata; ✓ Neftchi Baku; ✓ Karpaty Lvov; ✓ Dinamo Minsk; ✓ CSKA Moscow; ✓ Zenit Leningrad; ✓ SKA Rostov-na-Donu; ✓ Pakhtakor Tashkent; ✓ Shakhter Donetsk	✓ Chernomorets Odessa; ✓ Torpedo Kutaisi; ✓ Spartak Ordzhonikidze; ✓ Dnepr Dnepropetrovsk; ✓ Lokomotiv Moscow; ✓ Metallist Kharkov; ✓ Dinamo Leningrad; ✓ Krylya Sovetov Kuibyshev; ✓ Rubin Kazan; ✓ Shakhter Karaganda	✓ Zhalgiris Vilnius; ✓ Moldova Kishinev; ✓ Tekstilschik Ivanovo; ✓ Volgar Astrakhan; ✓ Uralmash Sverdlovsk; ✓ Daugava Riga; ✓ Pamir Dushanbe; ✓ Alga Frunze; ✓ Stroitel Ashkhabad; ✓ Metallurg Zaporozhye; ✓ Shinnik Yaroslavl; ✓ Kuzbass Kemerovo

Source: []

== Competition schedule ==
=== Preliminary round ===
[Mar 6, 10] 
ALGA Frunze                1-1  2-1  Textilshchik Ivanovo  [both legs in Osh] 
Daugava Riga               1-0  0-3  URALMASH Sverdlovsk 
KUZBASS Kemerovo           2-0  0-0  Volgar Astrakhan 
MOLDOVA Kishinev           2-0  0-0  Shinnik Yaroslavl     [both legs in Kishinev] 
Stroitel Ashkhabad         1-1  0-0  METALLURG Zaporozhye 
Žalgiris Vilnius           2-3  1-0  PAMIR Dushanbe

=== First round ===
[Mar 16, 20] 
ARARAT Yerevan             1-0  2-2  Chernomorets Odessa 
  [1. Edik Arutyunyan 88] 
  [2. Eduard Markarov 5, Edik Arutyunyan 20 – Ishtvan Sekech 29, Anatoliy Shepel 45] 
CSKA Moskva                1-0  2-1  Torpedo Kutaisi       [both legs in Sochi] 
  [1. Boris Kopeikin 24] 
  [2. Boris Kopeikin 35, Vladimir Dorofeyev 75 – Shota Okropirashvili 44] 
DINAMO Kiev                2-1  1-0  Alga Frunze 
  [1. Anatoliy Puzach 28, Viktor Serebryanikov 48 – Alexandr Kantsurov 73. Att: 15,600] 
  [2. Vladimir Onishchenko 53. Att: 25,000 (in Simferopol)] 
Dinamo Leningrad           0-3  0-1  ZARYA Voroshilovgrad  [both legs in Sochi] 
  [1. Vladimir Belousov 47, 73, Viktor Kuznetsov 61] 
  [2. Yuriy Vasenin 1] 
DINAMO Tbilisi             0-0  2-1  Krylya Sovetov Kuibyshev 
  [2. Givi Nodia 63, Slava Metreveli 75 pen – Ravil Aryapov 36] 
KARPATY Lvov               2-2  1-0  Pamir Dushanbe 
  [1. Igor Kulchitskiy 30 pen, 79 – Georgiy Martyan 9, Vladimir Gulyamhaydarov 81. Att: 25,000] 
  [2. Yanosh Gabovda 81] 
KAYRAT Alma-Ata            1-1  2-1  Dnepr Dnepropetrovsk 
  [1. Yevgeniy Piunovskiy 17 – Viktor Romanyuk 72 pen] 
  [2. Yuriy Sevidov 70, Yevgeniy Mikhailin 78 pen – Alexei Khristyan 81] 
Kuzbass Kemerovo           0-2  1-2  DINAMO Moskva         [both legs in Kirovabad] 
  [1. Yuriy Syomin 35, Vladimir Kozlov 40 pen. Att: 10,000] 
  [2. Vasiliy Ryashin 59 – Gennadiy Yevryuzhikhin 49, Nikolai Kozhemyakin 85. Att: 6,000] 
NEFTCHI Baku               1-0  0-0  Lokomotiv Moskva 
  [1. Anatoliy Banishevskiy 39] 
PAHTAKOR Tashkent          1-1  1-0  Moldova Kishinev 
  [1. Boris Leonov 18 – Igor Nadein 39] 
  [2. Boris Leonov 15] 
Rubin Kazan                0-1  0-1  TORPEDO Moskva 
  [1. Mikhail Gershkovich 20] 
  [2. Vladimir Yurin 86] 
SHAKHTYOR Donetsk          2-0  1-1  UralMash Sverdlovsk 
  [1. Valeriy Yaremchenko 14, Yaroslav Kikot 25] 
  [2. Viktor Prokopenko 49 – Darvis Hamadiyev 27. (in Kramatorsk)] 
Shakhtyor Karaganda        2-0  0-3  SKA Rostov-na-Donu  [aet] 
  [1. Anatoliy Novikov 53, Alexandr Savchenkov 56. (in Kislovodsk)] 
  [2. Anatoliy Maslyayev 25, 105, Boris Serostanov 71] 
SPARTAK Moskva             3-0  1-0  Metallurg Zaporozhye 
  [1. Nikolai Osyanin 53, Vyacheslav Yegorovich 70, Galimzyan Husainov 80. Att: 15,000 (in Yerevan)] 
  [2. Nikolai Osyanin 52. Att: 25,000] 
Spartak Orjonikidze        1-4  0-0  DINAMO Minsk 
  [1. Georgiy Kaishauri 39 – Vladimir Sakharov 15, 87, Nikolai Smirnov 26, Anatoliy Vasilyev 78. Att: 15,000] 
  [2. Att: 10,000 (in Grozny)] 
ZENIT Leningrad            2-0  2-0  Metallist Kharkov     [both legs in Sochi] 
  [1. Boris Kokh 12, Lev Burchalkin 56] 
  [2. Vladimir Polyakov 10, Boris Kokh 26]

=== Second round ===
[Mar 27, 31] 
Ararat Yerevan             0-0  1-2  DINAMO Tbilisi 
  [2. Norair Mesropyan 66 – Slava Metreveli 24 pen, Kakhi Asatiani 86] 
Dinamo Moskva              0-2  0-4  NEFTCHI Baku 
  [1. Nikolai Smolnikov 11, Vitaliy Shevchenko 73. Att: 10,000 (in Tbilisi)] 
  [2. Anatoliy Banishevskiy 33, 55, 60 pen, Nikolai Smolnikov 57. Att: 25,000] 
SHAKHTYOR Donetsk          0-0  2-2  CSKA Moskva 
  [2. Viktor Prokopenko 76, 87 – Yuriy Istomin 35, Boris Kopeikin 37. (in Simferopol)] 
SKA Rostov-na-Donu         2-0  0-1  Karpaty Lvov 
  [1. Viktor Bondarenko 2, 20] 
  [2. Igor Kulchitskiy 53 pen. Att: 40,000] 
SPARTAK Moskva             3-0  1-1  Pahtakor Tashkent 
  [1. Vyacheslav Yegorovich 30, 33, 47. Att: 15,000 (in Yerevan)] 
  [2. Nikolai Osyanin 55 – Tulyagan Isakov 17. Att: 25,000] 
TORPEDO Moskva             3-0  1-0  Dinamo Minsk          [both legs in Sochi] 
  [1. Gennadiy Shalimov 8, Mikhail Gershkovich 53, 82] 
  [2. David Pais 34] 
Zarya Voroshilovgrad       0-0  1-2  KAYRAT Alma-Ata 
  [2. Yuriy Yeliseyev 85 - Vladimir Chebotaryov 31, Oleg Dolmatov 73] 
ZENIT Leningrad            0-0  1-0  Dinamo Kiev 
  [1. Att: 2,000 (in Sochi)] 
  [2. Vladimir Nikolskiy 89. Att: 10,000 (in Simferopol)]

=== Quarterfinals ===
[Jul 1] 
Dinamo Tbilisi          0-2  TORPEDO Moskva 
  [Yuriy Smirnov-2] 
NEFTCHI Baku            3-2  Zenit Leningrad 
  [Vyacheslav Semiglazov 9, Kazbek Tuayev 21, Anatoliy Banishevskiy 57 – Boris Kokh 24, 74] 
SKA Rostov-na-Donu      2-1  Shakhtyor Donetsk 
  [Ivan Matviyenko 44, Anzor Chikhladze 59 – Valeriy Shevlyuk 12] 
[Jul 2] 
SPARTAK Moskva          1-0  Kayrat Alma-Ata       [aet] 
  [Nikolai Osyanin 95. Att: 20,000]

=== Semifinals ===
[Jul 24] 
SKA Rostov-na-Donu      3-1  Torpedo Moskva 
  [Viktor Bondarenko 44, Anzor Chikhladze 59, Alexei Yeskov 87 pen – Alexandr Chumakov 89] 
SPARTAK Moskva          5-0  Neftchi Baku 
  [Galimzyan Husainov 17, Jemal Silagadze 28 pen, 75, Gennadiy Logofet 41, Vyacheslav Yegorovich 86. Att: 35,000]

==== Final ====
7 August 1971

Spartak Moscow	2 – 2	SKA Rostov-na-Donu
Husainov 6'; Logofet 90'	Report	Kucinskas 3'; Zinchenko 68'

Lenin's Central Stadium, Moscow
Attendance: 100,000
Referee: Anatoliy Milchenko (Sukhumi)
8 August 1971

Spartak Moscow	1 – 0	SKA Rostov-na-Donu
Kiselev 55'	Report

Lenin's Central Stadium, Moscow
Attendance: 50,000
Referee: Anatoliy Milchenko (Sukhumi)
