= Oldest Russian derby =

Moscow football rivalry

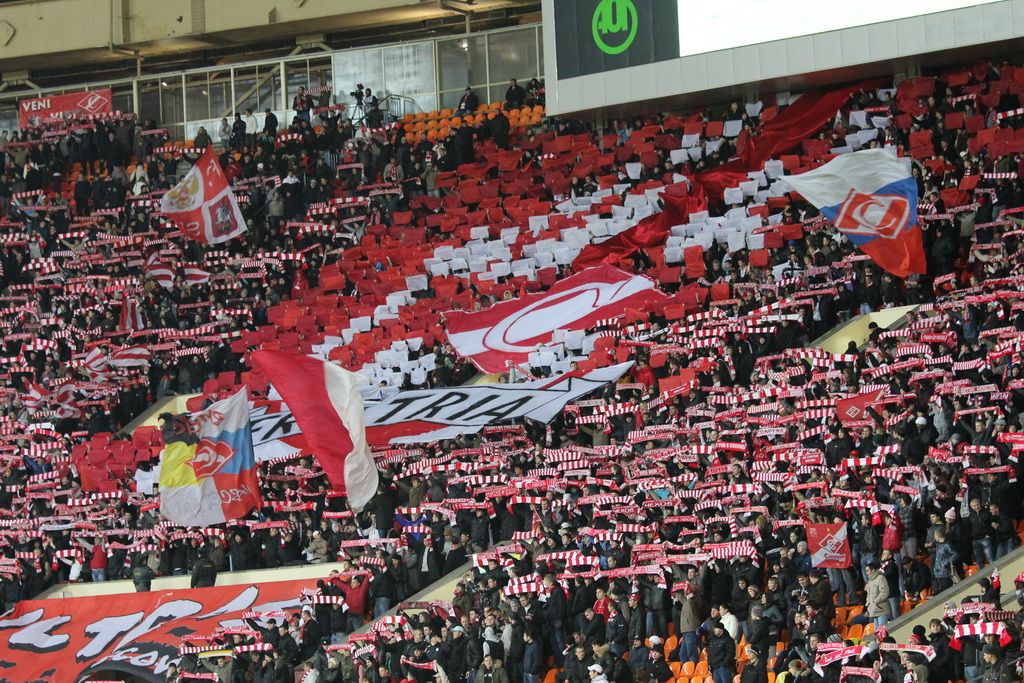
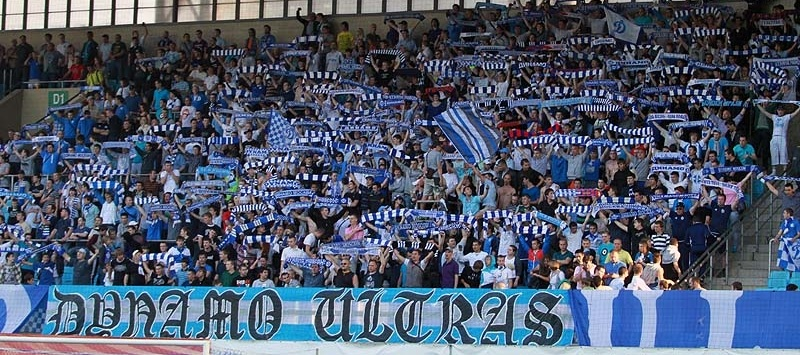
- Spartak and Dynamo supporters.
- Location: Moscow
- Teams: Dynamo Moscow; Spartak Moscow
- Latest meeting: Spartak 1-0 Dynamo (March 18, 2026); 2025-26 Russian Cup (Semi-Final 2nd Leg)
- Next meeting: September 6, 2026

Statistics
- Total meetings: 206
- Most wins: Spartak (80)
- All-time series: Spartak Moscow: 80; Drawn: 70; Dynamo Moscow: 57
- Largest victory: Spartak 7–1 Dynamo (14 September 1991) (Soviet Top League)

The Oldest Russian derby (Russian: Старейшее российское дерби) is a football rivalry played between Moscow rivals FC Spartak Moscow and FC Dynamo Moscow. The derby became less intense as Dynamo Moscow has not won a title since 1976 and only once succeeded in domestic competitions since the fall of the Soviet Union. Spartak missed the 1977 season of the Soviet League due to relegation, while Dynamo missed the 2016–17 season of the Russian Premier League.

== History ==
=== Game of political importance ===
This Moscow derby has also a political dimension. The teams fought each other for the championship of Moscow, and then for the Soviet Top League. In 1942, the founder and footballer of Spartak, Nikolai Starostin, was arrested, along with his three brothers among other teammates, facing accusations of involvement in a plot to kill Joseph Stalin. After two years of interrogations, the charges were dropped but the Starostin brothers were tried and sentenced to spend 10 years in the camps of Siberia. Throughout all those years, Nikolai Starostin had always believed that Lavrentiy Beria, Dynamo Moscow's chief patron, was the one behind all this. Returning from prison, Nikolai Starostin became chairman of Spartak again and always demanded from his players at all costs to beat Dynamo.

=== Decline ===
Around the end of the 1970s, the Spartak-Dynamo rivalry had lost its status in Soviet football; the blue-and-whites were slowly declining and Dynamo Kiev became the main rival of the red-and-whites.

== Honours ==
Competition	Spartak	Dynamo
Soviet Top League	12 times: 1936 Autumn, 1938, 1939, 1952, 1953, 1956, 1958, 1962, 1969, 1979, 1987, 1989	11 times: 1936 Spring, 1937, 1940, 1945, 1949, 1954, 1955, 1957, 1959, 1963, 1976 Spring
Russian Premier League	10 times: 1992, 1993, 1994, 1996, 1997, 1998, 1999, 2000, 2001, 2016/2017	0
Soviet Cup	10 times: 1938, 1939, 1946, 1947, 1950, 1958, 1963, 1965, 1971, 1991/1992	6 times: 1937, 1953, 1966/1967, 1970,1977, 1984
Russian Cup	3 times: 1993/1994, 1997/1998, 2002/2003	1 time: 1994/1995
USSR Super Cup	0	1 time: 1977
Russian Super Cup	1 time: 2017	0
USSR Federation Cup	1 time: 1987	0
Total	37	19

== Crossing the divide ==
=== Players who have played for both clubs ===
Player	Date of birth	Spartak			Dynamo
Player	Date of birth	year	Matches	Goals	Years	Matches	Goals
Konstantin Kvashnin	27.12.1898	1923–1927			1928–1930
Sergei Salnikov	25.09.1925	1942–1944, 1946–1949, 1955–1960	202	64	1950–1954	112	29
Jonas Bauža	14.02.1942	1970–1971	21	-23	1969–1970	3	-4
Vadim Ivanov	17.07.1943	1969–1971	75	2	1962–1968	144	3
Yury Syomin	11.05.1947	1965–1967	43	6	1962–1968	95	19
Vladimir Eshtrekov	16.05.1947	1965	8	1	1968–1973	102	11
Evgeny Lovchev	29.01.1949	1969–1978	249	30	1979–1980	19	0
Yuri Gavrilov	03.05.1953	1977–1985	280	90	1972–1977	37	5
Aleksandr Minayev	11.08.1954	1972–1975	92	10	1976–1984	212	21
Nikolai Latysh	02.08.1955	1986	5	0	1979–1984	124	20
Aleksandr Bubnov	10.10.1955	1983–1989	169	3	1974–1982	206	7
Aleksandr Bokiy	03.05.1957	1987–1989	41	0	1978–1980	18	0
Vagiz Khidiyatullin	03.03.1959	1976–1980, 1986–1988	155	14	1994	15	1
Aleksei Prudnikov	20.03.1960	1979–1982, 1989	19	–10	1983–1987	129	–138
Gennady Morozov	30.12.1962	1980–1986, 1989-90	196	3	1987–1988	40	1
Aleksei Yeryomenko	17.01.1964	1986–1987	26	5	1988–1990	36	3
Dmytro Tyapushkin	06.11.1964	1994–1995	22	–15	1997–1998	52	-40
Renat Ataulin	02.05.1965	1986	15	0	1984–1985, 1992	52	1
Andrei Mokh	20.10.1965	1991	20	1	1989–1991	46	2
Andrei Ivanov	06.04.1967	1988–1990, 1991–1994, 1995	109	1	1994	16	1
Andrey Chernyshov	07.01.1968	1992–1993			1988–1991, 1993–1994
Kakhaber Tskhadadze	07.09.1968	1992	7	0	1992	12	0
Vali Gasimov	04.10.1968	1992	6	0	1992	17	16
Nikolai Pisarev	23.11.1968	1992–1995, 1998, 2000–2001	115	32	1999	16	4
Andrei Smetanin	21.06.1969	1998–2001	14	0	1987–1997	129	0
Yuri Kovtun	05.01.1970	1999-2005	122	7	1993–1998	156	5
Vladimir Beschastnykh	01.04.1974	1991–1994, 2001-2002	104	56	2004–2005	21	4
Dmytro Parfyonov	11.09.1974	1998–2005	125	15	2006	3	0
Konstantin Golovskoy	25.04.1975	1996–1998	24	0	1998–2001	49	10
Pyotr Nemov	18.10.1983	2002	2	0	2000–2001	11	1
Pavel Pogrebnyak	08.11.1983	2002–2004	18	2	2015–2018	25	1
Andrey Yeshchenko	09.02.1984	2016–2021	89	1	2006, 2016	18	0
Aleksandr Samedov	19.07.1984	2001–2005	47	6	2010–2012	70	9
Aleksei Rebko	23.04.1986	2001–2007	13	0	2010	19	0
Vladimir Granat	22.01.1987	2015–2016	14	0	2005–2015	219	4
Dmitri Kombarov	22.05.1987	2010–2019	226	21	2006–2010	132	12
Kirill Kombarov	22.05.1987	2010–2016	73	0	2006–2010	101	7
Sergei Parshivlyuk	24.02.1989	2006–2016	148	3	2019–	81	1
Aleksandr Prudnikov	18.03.1989	2007–2008	33	4	2014	6	0
Aleksandr Zotov	27.08.1990	2008–2013	32	0	2016–2018	44	5
Aleksandr Kokorin	19.03.1991	2020–2021	8	2	2008–2016	171	41
Roman Zobnin	11.02.1994	2016–	186	13	2013–2016	48	2
Aleksandr Tashayev	23.06.1994	2018–2019	20	0	2011–2018	76	9

- Sort by date of birth
- A partial list of players

=== Managers worked in both clubs ===
Manager	Spartak	Dynamo
Konstantin Kvashnin	1937–1938, 1944, 1948	1935–1936
Konstantin Beskov	1977–1988	1967–1972, 1994–1995
Georgi Yartsev	1996	1998–1999
Oleg Romantsev	1989–1995, 1996–2003	2004–2005
Stanislav Cherchesov	2007–2008	2014–2015

== Statistics ==
=== Head-to-head record ===
Competition	Country	Games	Spartak	Draw	Dynamo
League	(Soviet Union) USSR	99	28	39	32
League	Russia	53	27	17	9
League	Total	152	55	56	41
Cup	(Soviet Union) USSR	11	6	2	3
Cup	Russia	5	2	0	3
Cup	Total	16	8	2	6
Federation Cup	(Soviet Union) USSR	7	0	5	2
Prize Union Committee	(Soviet Union) USSR	1	0	1	0
Moscow Championship	(Soviet Union) USSR	22	9	4	9
Other	(Soviet Union) USSR	6	3	1	2
Other	Russia	3	0	1	2
Other	Total	9	3	2	4
Total		207	75	70	62

=== Head-to-head record in Russian Football National League ===
Competition	Country	Games	Spartak-2	Draw	Dynamo
League	Russia	2	0	1	1
League	Total	2	0	1	1

== Record wins ==
=== Spartak biggest wins ===
1991 — Soviet Top League — Spartak — Dynamo 7:1
1985 —Soviet Top League — Spartak — Dynamo 5:1
2005 — Russian Premier League — Spartak — Dynamo 5:1
2012 — Russian Premier League — Dynamo — Spartak 0:4

=== Dynamo biggest wins ===
1946 — Soviet Top League — Dynamo — Spartak 5:0
1940 — Soviet Top League — Spartak — Dynamo 1:5
1945 — Soviet Top League — Dynamo — Spartak 4:0
1948 — Soviet Top League — Dynamo — Spartak 5:1
1966 — Soviet Top League — Dynamo — Dynamo 4:0
2012 — Russian Premier League — Spartak — Dynamo 1:5

== Matches list ==
=== Soviet Top League 1936 - 1992 ===
		Spartak vs Dynamo			Dynamo vs Spartak		
Season	Division	Venue	Atten.	Score	Venue	Atten.	Score
1936	Group A				Dynamo Stadium	60,000	1–0
1936	Group A				Dynamo Stadium	40,000	3–3
1937	Group A	Dynamo Stadium	60,000	0–0	Dynamo Stadium	60,000	0–1
1938	Group A				Dynamo Stadium	60,000	1–4
1939	Group A	Dynamo Stadium	75,000	0–0	Dynamo Stadium	80,000	1–1
1940	Group A	Dynamo Stadium	85,000	1–5	Dynamo Stadium	80,000	2–2
1941	Group A	Dynamo Stadium	80,000	1–1			
1945	First Group	Lokomotiv Stadium	35,000	1–1	Dynamo Stadium	60,000	4–0
1946	First Group	Dynamo Stadium	80,000	1–4	Dynamo Stadium	50,000	5–0
1947	First Group	Dynamo Stadium	55,000	1–2	Dynamo Stadium	65,000	1–0
1948	First Group	Dynamo Stadium	50,000	3–0	Dynamo Stadium	70,000	5–1
1949	First Group	Dynamo Stadium	60,000	1–4	Dynamo Stadium	60,000	5–4
1950	Class A	Dynamo Stadium	70,000	1–3	Dynamo Stadium	60,000	1–1
1951	Class A	Dynamo Stadium	70,000	1–3	Dynamo Stadium	70,000	1–2
1952	Class A				Dynamo Stadium	60,000	0–0
1953	Class A	Dynamo Stadium	80,000	1–1	Dynamo Stadium	60,000	2–2
1954	Class A	Dynamo Stadium	60,000	0–2	Dynamo Stadium	70,000	1–0
1955	Class A	Dynamo Stadium	70,000	2–1	Dynamo Stadium	70,000	1–4
1956	Class A	Dynamo Stadium	100,000	1–1	Dynamo Stadium	80,000	1–1
1957	Class A	Luzhniki Stadium	103,000	1–0	Dynamo Stadium	70,000	1–1
1958	Class A	Luzhniki Stadium	105,000	1–2	Luzhniki Stadium	90,000	0–1
1959	Class A	Luzhniki Stadium	106,000	0–1	Luzhniki Stadium	103,000	1–3
1960	Separated into two groups of 11 teams for the first round						
1961	Class A	Luzhniki Stadium	103,000	3–1	Luzhniki Stadium	100,000	3–1
1962	Class A	Luzhniki Stadium	104,000	1–0	Luzhniki Stadium	82,000	2–0
1963	Class A (1st Group)	Luzhniki Stadium	103,000	0–1	Luzhniki Stadium	100,000	0–0
1964	Class A (1st Group)	Luzhniki Stadium	104,000	1–0	Luzhniki Stadium	29,000	2–1
1965	Class A (1st Group)	Luzhniki Stadium	24,000	0–1	Luzhniki Stadium	69,000	0–2
1966	Class A (1st Group)	Luzhniki Stadium	80,000	1–0	Luzhniki Stadium	55,000	4–0
1967	Class A (1st Group)	Luzhniki Stadium	103,000	0–0	Luzhniki Stadium	94,000	0–0
1968	Class A (1st Group)	Luzhniki Stadium	73,000	2–1	Luzhniki Stadium	56,000	2–1
1969	Class A (1st Group)	Luzhniki Stadium	56,000	2–3	Luzhniki Stadium	54,000	0–2
1970	Supreme League	Luzhniki Stadium	65,000	4–1	Dynamo Stadium	56,000	0–0
1971	Supreme League	Luzhniki Stadium	47,800	1–1	Dynamo Stadium	52,000	0–0
1972	Supreme League	Luzhniki Stadium	6,500	1–0	Dynamo Stadium	35,000	1–4
1973	Supreme League	Luzhniki Stadium	30,800	1–0	Dynamo Stadium	19,000	0–0
1974	Supreme League	Luzhniki Stadium	35,800	0–0	Dynamo Stadium	45,000	1–1
1975	Supreme League	Luzhniki Stadium	40,800	0–0	Dynamo Stadium	54,000	2–1
1976	Supreme League	Luzhniki Stadium	3,500	1–0	Dynamo Stadium	35,000	1–0
1977	There were no games due to the relegation of Spartak to the 2nd Division						
1978	Supreme League	Luzhniki Stadium	10,800	1–2	Lokomotiv Stadium	23,000	0–0
1979	Supreme League	Luzhniki Stadium	35,800	2–1	Torpedo Stadium	21,000	0–0
1980	Supreme League	Luzhniki Stadium	50,800	0–0	Dynamo Stadium	54,000	2–2
1981	Supreme League	Luzhniki Stadium	35,200	1–2	Dynamo Stadium	33,500	1–1
1982	Supreme League	Luzhniki Stadium	37,200	0–1	Dynamo Stadium	40,000	0–2
1983	Supreme League	Luzhniki Stadium	42,700	3–0	Dynamo Stadium	27,000	0–0
1984	Supreme League	Luzhniki Stadium	14,800	0–0	Dynamo Stadium	33,600	0–0
1985	Supreme League	Luzhniki Stadium	25,800	5–1	Dynamo Stadium	5,800	2–0
1986	Supreme League	Luzhniki Stadium	45,800	2–2	Dynamo Stadium	33,700	2–1
1987	Supreme League	Luzhniki Stadium	60,800	1–1	Dynamo Stadium	50,000	1–1
1988	Supreme League	Luzhniki Stadium	41,000	1–0	Dynamo Stadium	29,000	1–2
1989	Supreme League	Luzhniki Stadium	42,000	1–1	Dynamo Stadium	43,000	0–0
1990	Supreme League	Luzhniki Stadium	33,800	1–2	Dynamo Stadium	20,000	1–1
1991	Supreme League	Luzhniki Stadium	25,000	7–1	Dynamo Stadium	20,000	1–1

=== Russian League 1992 - ===
		Spartak vs Dynamo			Dynamo vs Spartak		
Season	Division	Venue	Atten.	Score	Venue	Atten.	Score
1992	Russian Top League	Luzhniki Stadium	20,000	4–3	Dynamo Stadium	3,000	2–5
1993	Russian Top League	Luzhniki Stadium	18,000	3–0	Dynamo Stadium	19,000	1–1
1994	Russian Top League	Luzhniki Stadium	15,000	1–1	Dynamo Stadium	8,300	0–0
1995	Russian Top League	Luzhniki Stadium	30,000	2–0	Dynamo Stadium	11,000	0–2
1996	Russian Top League	Luzhniki Stadium	17,000	3–1	Dynamo Stadium	11,000	2–1
1997	Russian Top League	Luzhniki Stadium	20,000	1–2	Dynamo Stadium	35,000	1–1
1998	Russian Top Division	Luzhniki Stadium	15,000	2–0	Dynamo Stadium	35,683	0–0
1999	Russian Top Division	Luzhniki Stadium	40,000	2–2	Dynamo Stadium	22,000	1–1
2000	Russian Top Division	Luzhniki Stadium	24,000	3–1	Dynamo Stadium	20,000	2–4
2001	Russian Top Division	Luzhniki Stadium	15,000	2–1	Dynamo Stadium	13,500	1–1
2002	Russian Premier League	Luzhniki Stadium	9,000	1–0	Dynamo Stadium	13,000	0–1
2003	Russian Premier League	Luzhniki Stadium	20,000	2–1	Dynamo Stadium	14,000	3–2
2004	Russian Premier League	Luzhniki Stadium	12,000	2–2	Dynamo Stadium	14,500	1–1
2005	Russian Premier League	Luzhniki Stadium	26,000	5–1	Dynamo Stadium	20,000	0–1
2006	Russian Premier League	Luzhniki Stadium	16,000	3–2	Dynamo Stadium	20,000	0–0
2007	Russian Premier League	Luzhniki Stadium	37,000	2–1	Dynamo Stadium	22,000	0–1
2008	Russian Premier League	Luzhniki Stadium	19,000	1–1	Dynamo Stadium	30,000	4–3
2009	Russian Premier League	Luzhniki Stadium	30,000	0–2	Arena Khimki	15,758	1–1
2010	Russian Premier League	Luzhniki Stadium	43,000	0–1	Arena Khimki	12,378	1–1
2011–12	Russian Premier League	Luzhniki Stadium	20,752	0–2	Arena Khimki	18,636	1–1
2011–12	Russian Premier League	Luzhniki Stadium	14,640	1–1	Arena Khimki	15,487	1–3
2012–13	Russian Premier League	Luzhniki Stadium	13,856	1–5	Arena Khimki	15,209	0–4
2013–14	Russian Premier League	Lokomotiv Stadium	12,180	3–2	Arena Khimki	16,714	1–4
2014–15	Russian Premier League	Otkrytie Arena	37,923	1-0	Arena Khimki	13,351	1–2
2015–16	Russian Premier League	Otkrytie Arena	26,508	3-0	Arena Khimki	13,748	2-3
2016–17	There were no games due to the relegation of Dynamo to the 2nd Division						
2017–18	Russian Premier League	Otkrytie Arena	42,124	0–1	Arena Khimki	17,133	2–2
2018–19	Russian Premier League	Otkrytie Arena	43,139	2–1	Arena Khimki	14,674	0–1
2019–20	Russian Premier League	Otkrytie Arena	34,389	0–0	VTB Arena	24,946	0–2
2020–21	Russian Premier League	Otkrytie Arena	4,953	1–1	VTB Arena	12,567	1–2
2021–22	Russian Premier League	Otkrytie Arena	10,443	2–2	VTB Arena	19,353	0–2
2022–23	Russian Premier League	Otkrytie Arena	8,985	3–3	VTB Arena	25,249	1–0
2023–24	Russian Premier League	Otkrytie Arena	19,025	1–0	VTB Arena	18,072	2–1
2024–25	Russian Premier League	Lukoil Arena	26,297	2–2			

=== Soviet Cup 1936 - 1992 ===
Season	Venue	Atten.	Score
1949	Dynamo Stadium	-	2–2
1949	Dynamo Stadium	-	2–1
1950	Dynamo Stadium	75,000	3–0
1952	Olympic Stadium	40,000	0–3
1954	Dynamo Stadium	70,000	3–1
1955	Dynamo Stadium	70,000	1–4
1958	Luzhniki Stadium	-	2–1
1963	Luzhniki Stadium	-	2–0
1979	Luzhniki Stadium	30,000	3–0
1990	LFK CSKA	3,500	1–1
1990	LFK CSKA	4,000	2–1

=== Russian Cup 1992 - ===
Season	Venue	Atten.	Score
1994	Dynamo Stadium	19,500	0-1
1995	Dynamo Stadium	13,000	1–0
2008–09	Luzhniki Stadium	23,000	0–3
2020–21	VTB Arena	11,322	2–0
2021–22	Luzhniki Stadium	69,306	2–1
2023–24	Otkritie Arena	19,280	4–1
2023–24	VTB Arena	18,205	3–0
2023–24	VTB Arena	25,512	2–0
2024–25	Lukoil Arena	20,431	3–0
2024–25	VTB Arena	2 October 2024	
