= Archil Kiknadze =

Georgian and Soviet football player and manager

Personal information
- Full name: Archil Kiknadze
- Date of birth: 16 March 1915
- Place of birth: Chkheri, Kharagauli, Kutais Governorate, Russian Empire
- Date of death: 27 June 1967 (aged 52)
- Place of death: Tbilisi, Soviet Union
- Height: 1.75 m (5 ft 9 in)
- Position: Defender

Youth career
- 1934–1936: ZII Tbilisi

Senior career*
Years	Team	Apps	(Gls)
1937–1949	FC Dinamo Tbilisi	160	(0)

Managerial career
- 1952: FC Dinamo Tbilisi (assistant)
- 1956–1957: FC Dinamo Tbilisi (assistant)
- * Club domestic league appearances and goals

Archil Kiknadze (Georgian: არჩილ კიკნაძე, Russian: Арчил Самуилович Кикнадзе; born 16 March 1915 in Chkheri, Kharagauli; died 27 June 1967 in Tbilisi), was a Georgian and Soviet football player and manager.

== Career ==
=== As a player ===
Kiknadze, born in village Chkheri, Kharagauli, started his career in ZII Tbilisi of Georgian SSR and made his debut in the club's first team squad at the age of 19. Because of his good performances during the official matches of the regional tournament within the Soviet Union, when ZII Tbilisi won Georgian SSR Championship in 1936 — Aleksey Andreevich Sokolov (1904–1989) senior then coach of Dinamo Tbilisi noticed this young player and invited him to join the club's reserve team. He became a regular player in the first team by the 1937 season, playing 6 League and one Soviet Cup games for the club.

The following year, Kiknadze played 13 League matches from 25 and 5 Soviet Cup games. First success came in 1939. In that year he also played 13 League matches from 26 and won with the club his first domestic honour — Soviet Top League Silver medal.

== Club career statistics ==
Club	Season	League		Cup		Continental		Total	
Club	Season	Apps	Goals	Apps	Goals	Apps	Goals	Apps	Goals
Dinamo Tbilisi	1937	6	0	1	0	—		7	0
Dinamo Tbilisi	1938	13	0	5	0	—		18	0
Dinamo Tbilisi	1939	13	0	2	0	—		15	0
Dinamo Tbilisi	1940	24	0	0	0	—		24	0
Dinamo Tbilisi	1941	9	0	0	0	—		9	0
Dinamo Tbilisi	1942–1944	Cancelled due to World War II							
Dinamo Tbilisi	1945	17	0	0	0	—		17	0
Dinamo Tbilisi	1946	19	0	4	0	—		23	0
Dinamo Tbilisi	1947	16	0	1	0	—		17	0
Dinamo Tbilisi	1948	21	0	3	0	—		24	0
Dinamo Tbilisi	1949	22	0	0	0	—		22	0
Dinamo Tbilisi	Total	160	0	17	0	−	−	177	0
Career totals		160	0	17	0	−	−	177	0

== Honours ==
=== Player ===
==== Club ====
Dinamo Tbilisi

- Soviet Top League runner-up: 1939, 1940
- Soviet Top League bronze medalist: 1946, 1947
- Soviet Cup runner-up: 1946
