= Boris Paichadze =

Soviet footballer (1915–1990)

Personal information
- Full name: Boris Solomonis dze Paichadze
- Date of birth: 3 February 1915
- Place of birth: Onchiketi, Ozurgeti uezd, Kutaisi Governorate, Caucasus Viceroyalty, Russian Empire
- Date of death: 9 October 1990 (aged 75)
- Place of death: Tbilisi, Georgian SSR, Soviet Union
- Height: 1.70 m (5 ft 7 in)
- Positions: Forward; second striker

Senior career*
Years	Team	Apps	(Gls)
1936–1951	Dinamo Tbilisi	195	(111)

Managerial career
- 1953–1954: Dinamo Tbilisi
- * Club domestic league appearances and goals

Boris Paichadze (Georgian: ბორის პაიჭაძე, [boɾis pʼaitʃʼadze]; Russian: Борис Соломонович Пайчадзе; 3 February 1915 – 9 October 1990) was a Soviet and Georgian footballer, who played for FC Dinamo Tbilisi. The largest stadium in Georgia, the Boris Paichadze Stadium in Tbilisi, is named after him. In 2001, he was voted the best Georgian football player of the 20th century.

== Career ==
Born in Onchiketi, Paichadze's family moved to Poti when he was 7 years old. He started playing career in some local youth football clubs there. During these times, football was just making its first steps in Georgia and there was only a few clubs established. However, every city had its own selection of footballers. Paichadze joined the team of Poti at the age of 16.

Paichadze was invited to Dinamo Tbilisi in 1936 by coach Jules Limbeck. He made his debut in Soviet Top League during that season, being able to score 13 goals in 12 games. Paichadze later declared that it was Limbeck, who pioneered the coaching in Caucasus via his lectures, attended by various managers across the region.

Paichadze became top scorer of Soviet Top League in the 1937 season. However, the most efficient season for him was 1939, when he scored total 25 goals for Dinamo. Paichadze was prized by the various sporting media sources, after his performance against CDKA Moscow in November, when Dinamo was able to win the game 5–4, after losing the first half 1–4.

During the 1941 Soviet Top League season, Dinamo was one of the leaders of league table, when the championship was cancelled due to World War II. Alongside his teammates, Paichadze joined the army.

After three years of cancellation, championship again resumed in 1945. Paichadze returned to Dinamo and again became one of the key figures of the club. However, in 1947, in a game against Torpedo Moscow, Paichadze got a serious injury after the collision with Nikolai Morozov. It prevented him playing for nearly two years. After recovering, he never regained the old playing form and soon decided to retire from football.

In 1953, soon after retiring from football, Paichadze was invited back to Dinamo to become a head coach of the club. He accepted and managed his former club for only two seasons without any success. He resigned in 1954, claiming that "being a good player doesn't mean you are a good coach".

In 1963-1985 Paichadze was a director of the Lenin Dinamo Stadium in Tbilisi.

== Personal life ==
Paichadze later declared that he had a close relationship with famous Soviet politician Lavrentiy Beria. Beria, who is considered to be a huge fan of Dinamo, even prevented Paichadze from moving to Spartak Moscow, that was very keen to sign Paichadze during his peak years.

Paichadze was nicknamed "Caruso of football" in Romania by the local fans and journalists, after his performance in a friendly tournament held in the country in 1945.

Paichadze was a close friend to a Georgian Greco-Roman wrestler Givi Kartozia.

In 1975, Paichadze made a cameo appearance in film Pirveli Mertskhali (The First Swallow), directed by Nana Mchedlidze, who invited the former footballer as a consultant as well.

He died in October 1990.

== Club career statistics ==
Club	Season	League		Cup		Continental		Total	
Club	Season	Apps	Goals	Apps	Goals	Apps	Goals	Apps	Goals
Dinamo Tbilisi	1936	12	13	8	5	—		20	18
Dinamo Tbilisi	1937	16	8	7	4	—		23	12
Dinamo Tbilisi	1938	24	14	5	8	—		29	22
Dinamo Tbilisi	1939	26	19	7	6	—		33	25
Dinamo Tbilisi	1940	24	11	0	0	—		24	11
Dinamo Tbilisi	1941	10	6	0	0	—		10	6
Dinamo Tbilisi	1942–1944	Cancelled due to World War II							
Dinamo Tbilisi	1945	16	7	3	2	—		19	9
Dinamo Tbilisi	1946	22	14	4	1	—		26	15
Dinamo Tbilisi	1947	10	8	2	0	—		12	8
Dinamo Tbilisi	1948	0	0	0	0	—		0	0
Dinamo Tbilisi	1949	12	1	0	0	—		12	1
Dinamo Tbilisi	1950	21	9	3	1	—		24	10
Dinamo Tbilisi	1951	2	1	1	2	—		3	3
Dinamo Tbilisi	Total	195	111	40	29	−	−	235	140
Career totals		195	111	40	29	−	−	235	140
