= Jejelava =

Jejelava, sometimes Dzhedzhelava (Georgian: ჯეჯელავა) is a Georgian-language surname. Notable people with the surname include:

- Aleksandre Jejelava (born 1973), Minister of Education and Science of Georgia from June 2016 to June 2018
- Gaioz Jejelava (1914–2005), Soviet and Georgian footballer
- Spartak Jejelava (1923–1975), Soviet and Georgian footballer
