= FC Dinamo Tbilisi =

Association football club in Georgia

Dinamo Tbilisi
- Full name: Football Club Dinamo Tbilisi
- Nickname: Blue-White
- Founded: 1 September 1925; 101 years ago
- Ground: Boris Paichadze Dinamo Arena
- Capacity: 54,202
- President: Roman Pipia
- Manager: Temur Ketsbaia
- League: Erovnuli Liga
- 2025: Erovnuli Liga, 4th of 10
- Website: fcdinamo.ge
Home colours	Away colours

Football Club Dinamo Tbilisi (Georgian: დინამო თბილისი, pronounced [dinamo tʰbilisi]) is a Georgian professional football club based in Tbilisi that competes in the Erovnuli Liga, the top flight of Georgian football.

Dinamo Tbilisi was one of the most prominent clubs in Soviet football and a major contender in the Soviet Top League almost immediately after it was established in 1936. The club was then part of one of the leading sport societies in the Soviet Union, the All-Union Dynamo sports society which had several other divisions besides football and was sponsored by the Soviet Ministry of Internal Affairs. Its main claim to European fame was winning the Cup Winners' Cup in 1981, beating FC Carl Zeiss Jena of East Germany 2–1 in the final in Düsseldorf. It remains the only club based in Georgia to have ever lifted a trophy in European competition. Throughout its history, FC Dinamo Tbilisi produced many famous Soviet players: Boris Paichadze, Avtandil Gogoberidze, Shota Iamanidze, Mikheil Meskhi, Slava Metreveli, Murtaz Khurtsilava, Manuchar Machaidze, David Kipiani, Vladimir Gutsaev, Aleksandre Chivadze, Vitaly Daraselia, Ramaz Shengelia, and Tengiz Sulakvelidze. After the break-up of the Soviet Union, it would later produce some of the finest Georgian players such as Temur Ketsbaia, Shota Arveladze, Giorgi Kinkladze, Kakha Kaladze, Levan Kobiashvili, Khvicha Kvaratskhelia, Giorgi Mamardashvili etc.

Dinamo Tbilisi was one of a handful of teams in the Soviet Top League (along with Dynamo Kyiv and Dynamo Moscow) that were never relegated. Their most famous coach was Nodar Akhalkatsi, who led the team to the Soviet title in 1978, two Soviet Cups (1976 and 1979), and the UEFA Cup Winners' Cup in 1981. He was also one of three co-coaches of the Soviet Union national football team during the FIFA World Cup in 1982. FC Dinamo Tbilisi are also 19–time Georgian league champions and 13–time Georgian Cup holders (the current records).

== History ==
=== The beginning: 1920s ===
The history of FC Dinamo Tbilisi began in autumn 1925 when the Dinamo sports society set out to form a football club, at a time when football was gradually becoming one of the greatest and most popular sports in the world.

In 1927, FC Dinamo Tbilisi established a Junior club, "Norchi Dinamoeli" (young Dinamo). The Juniors club provided the senior with many young players, including the first goalkeeper who played for Dinamo in the USSR championship, the first captain Shota Savgulidze, defender Mikhail Minaev, forward Vladimer Berdzenishvili and other players.

In the early years, no official championship existed in Georgia, so the teams played friendly games against each other. The first match was played with Azerbaijan team Dinamo Baku on 26 January 1926, with the more experienced Azerbaijan squad winning 1–0. The Dinamo team starred: D. Tsomaia, A. Pochkhua, M. Blankman, I. Fedorov, N. Anikin, A. Gonel, A. Pivovarov, O. Goldobin, A. Galperin, S. Maslenikov, and V. Tsomaia.

Three days later, Dinamo played another Azerbaijani team, "Progress", and easily beat them 3–0.

Despite their success in the middle years of the 1930s, the Football Federation of the Soviet Union placed FC Dinamo Tbilisi in the first league instead of the Top League. Dinamo continued to show good form against the top teams, winning 9–5 in Tbilisi against probably the best team in the USSR championship, Dynamo Moscow. They later beat Dinamo Leningrad 3–2, winning 5 matches out of 6 plus a draw against Stalinec Moscow. This was enough for Dinamo to qualify for the top league.

=== World War II: 1930s and 1940s ===
The second championship started in autumn 1936. Altogether Dinamo played 1424 matches in the Soviet Union Championship. The first match was against Dynamo Kyiv, finishing 2–2, with goals by Nikolas Somov and Boris Paichadze. The team sheet was: A. Dorokhov, S. Shavgulidze (E. Nikolaishvili), B. Berdzenishvili, N. Anikin, V. Jorbenadze, G. Gagua, I. Panin, M. Berdzenishvili, B. Paichadze, M. Aslamazov, and N. Somov.

The first victory in the USSR championship was in the match against Spartak Moscow on 25 September with Mikheil Berdzenishvili scoring the winning goal. Dinamo finished the season in 3rd place. They challenged for the title, but this faded after the 2–3 loss against Krasnaia Zaria Leningrad. Dinamo also played an unforgettable match in Moscow against Spartak Moscow in the Soviet Cup quarter-final, when Dinamo beat them 6–3. They reached the first edition of the Soviet Cup final, but lost 0–2 to Lokomotiv Moscow. Their first international match was against the Spanish team Baskonia in 1937, which Dinamo lost 0–2.

In the 1930s and 1940s, Dinamo was one of the top Soviet football teams, even though they did not win a title. They were often referred to as the "crownless champions" with the team including S. Shavgulidze, A. Dorokhov, S. Shudra, B. Frolov, M. Berdzenishvili, A. Kiknadze, V. Paniukov, V. Berezhnoi, G. Gagua, V. Jorbenadze, and G. Jejelava.

=== 1950s ===
In the 1950s, the team was led by Avtandil Gogoberidze who spent 17 years with Dinamo. He still holds the record for games played and goals scored for Dinamo, with 341 matches and 127 goals. In the same period, the following players starred for Dinamo: G. Antadze, Vladimer Marghania, N. Dziapshipa, M. Minaev, A. Zazroev, V. Eloshvili, and Avtandil Chkuaseli.

A prominent place in Dinamo history belongs to Andro Jordania, a coach who is considered as one most important figures in the club's history. His period in charge was seen as "the Renaissance" of Dinamo's traditions, which laid the ground for the major successes connected with his name. The club's Digomi practice ground is named after him.

=== First Soviet successes: 1960s ===
The first major success came in the 1964 Soviet Top League when Dinamo won the Soviet Top League, with the team unbeaten in the last 15 matches. At the end, Dinamo was tied with Torpedo Moscow so the teams played an additional match in Tashkent, Uzbekistan, which Dinamo won 4–1. Georgian supporters celebrated the victory by naming their team "Golden Guys".

A popular French magazine, France Football, wrote: "Dinamo has great players. Their technique, skills, and playing intellect enables us to name them the best Eastern representatives of 'South American Football Traditions'. If Dinamo were able to participate in the UEFA European Cup, we are certain, they would bring the hegemony of Spanish-Italian teams to an end." However, no Soviet team appeared in the European Cup at that time.

The line-up of the winning team in 1964 was: Sergo Kotrikadze, Giorgi Sichinava, Guram Petriashvili, Jemal Zeinklishvili, Guram Tskhovrebov, Vakhtang Rekhviashvili, Shota Iamanidze, Slava Metreveli, Vladimer Barkaia, Mikheil Meskhi, Ilia Datunashvili, and Alexander Apshev. Coach: Gavriil Kachalin.

In the late 1960s and early 1970s, the quality of the Dinamo team was further enhanced by several skillful players: Mikheil Meskhi, Slava Metreveli, Murtaz Khurtsilava, Revaz Dzodzuashvili, Kakhi Asatiani, Gocha Gavasheli, Guram Petriashvili, Piruz Kanteladze, and the Nodia brothers, Givi and Levan.

=== European years: 1970s ===
Dinamo's first appearance in Europe was in 1972 against Dutch team Twente in the UEFA Cup. Dinamo won the game 3–2, with two goals scored by Givi Nodia and one by David Kipiani. The following players appeared on the field in this historic match: David Gogia, Revaz Dzodzuashvili, Vakhtang Chelidze, Murtaz Khurtsilava, Shota Khinchagashvili, Guram Petriashvili, Manuchar Machaidze, Kakhi Asatiani, Vladimir Gutsaev, Levan Nodia, Givi Nodia, and David Kipiani. In the second match Twente won the game 2–0 and progressed to the next round.

In 1973 Dinamo won their first International tournament. After beating Atlético Madrid and Benfica, the club won the Columbus's Caravela Trophy.

In 1976 Nodar Akhalkatsi was appointed as Dinamo's head coach. It was under his leadership that Dinamo achieved greatest success. The club was referred to as the "Great Team" between 1976 and 1982, characterised by a mobile, fast and technical style of play.

In this period Dinamo won the Soviet Cup for the first time in their history, convincingly defeating Armenian side Ararat Yerevan 3–0 in the final, with goals scored by David Kipiani, Piruz Kanteladze and Revaz Chelebadze. In 1978 the club won the Soviet Top League for a second time. Next year Dinamo won the Soviet Cup again by defeating Russian side Dynamo Moscow in the final. In 1979 the club played its first match in the UEFA European Cup tournament. In the first round Dinamo knocked out English side Liverpool, at the time one of the strongest teams in European football. After losing the first match at Anfield 1–2, Dinamo comfortably beat the opponent 3–0 in Tbilisi and advanced to the next round, where they were eliminated by German champions Hamburg. In the 1970s Dinamo also eliminated famous Italian sides Inter Milan and Napoli in European competitions.

1976 Soviet Cup Final

1979 Soviet Cup Final

1981 European Cup Winners' Cup Final

=== Last Soviet days: 1980s ===

Dinamo's famous 1981 title-winning squad

The highlight of Dinamo's history was winning the 1980–81 European Cup Winners' Cup, including knocking out clubs like West Ham United (4–1, 0–1) and Feyenoord Rotterdam (3–0, 0–2), and beating East German side Carl Zeiss Jena 2–1 in the final on 13 May 1981. Vitaly Daraselia and Vladimir Gutsaev scored goals in the final.

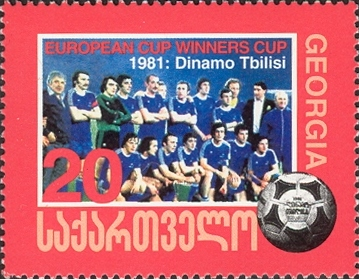
Dinamo Tbilisi, winner of 1981 European Cup Winners' Cup, on a Georgian stamp, 2002

Helmut Schön, 1974 FIFA World Cup winning coach said: "It is to be said directly, Dinamo deserved the victory. This team has top-quality performers."

Next year in 1982 as reigning champions Dinamo advanced to the semi-finals in the Cup Winners' Cup tournament, where they were eliminated by Belgian side Standard Liège. In the 1980s numerous skillful players appeared on the team, but for various reasons they were not able to do their best: Grigol Tsaava, Mikheil Meskhi (Junior), Otar Korghalidze, Gia Guruli, Mamuka Pantsulaia, Merab Jordania, Levan Baratashvili and many other talented players.

In 1983 a crisis began. It was hard for the club to go through the first rounds of the Soviet Cup. They also performed poorly in the championship. From 1983 to 1989 the team appeared only once in the UEFA tournaments.

Dinamo Tbilisi played its last game in the Soviet Top League on 27 October 1989 against Dynamo Kyiv. Dinamo played its first and last official matches in the Soviet championship with Dynamo Kyiv, with both matches ending 2–2.

=== 1990s ===
In 1990 the Georgian Football Federation refused to participate in the Soviet Union championship. That meant that no Georgian football clubs would appear in Soviet tournaments. From that moment the more recent history of FC Dinamo Tbilisi began.

During this time, as a means of distancing from the Soviet past, the club was renamed Iberia Tbilisi. This move was largely opposed by the supporters and by 1992 the club reverted to its initial name.

The club played its first match in the Georgian National championship against Kolkheti Poti on 30 March 1990. Dinamo lost the historic match, 0–1. Ultimately the club recovered from this setback and won the first Georgian National championship. The club also won the next 9 championships.

In 1992 came Dinamo's first double: the team won the league and the Georgian Cup, beating Tskhumi Sokhumi in the final. In 1993 Dinamo played its first international official match representing independent Georgia. Dinamo won the home match against Linfield 2–1, with goals from Shota Arveladze and Gela Inalishvili. The second leg in Belfast ended 1–1. However the club was disqualified for attempting to bribe the referee in the first leg.

Despite continued success in national cups and championships, the club had no success in European club tournaments.

In 1996 Dinamo passed 3 rounds in the UEFA Cup. They beat CS Grevenmacher 4–0, 2–2, Molde FK 2–1, 0–0 and Torpedo Moscow 1–0, 1–1. In the next round the club was unable to overcome Portuguese side Boavista and left the tournament.

Dinamo came very close to advancing in the 1998–99 UEFA Champions League group stages, but were eliminated by Athletic Bilbao on the away goals rule, 2–1, 0–1. The migration of key players to European clubs caused negative results. It became harder and harder for the club to win the Georgian Championship or Georgian Cup.

=== 2000s ===
In the early 2000s, famous Georgian businessman Badri Patarkatsishvili purchased FC Dinamo Tbilisi. In 2003 the club won the Georgian Championship and Georgian Cup.

In 2004 Dinamo, under the leadership of Croatian coach Ivo Šušak, won the CIS Cup in Moscow, beating Latvian side Skonto 3–1 in the final. In the same year, Dinamo successfully made it through the UEFA Cup qualifying rounds, after defeating BATE Borisov (1–0, 3–2), Slavia Prague (2–0, 1–3) and Wisła Kraków (2–1, 3–4) and qualified for the group stage, where their opponents were Newcastle United, Sporting CP, Sochaux and Panionios. Dinamo lost all four games and finished bottom in the group.

In the following season Dinamo were again Georgian champions and they won the Georgian championship again in 2008, when the head coach of Dinamo was Czech Dušan Uhrin.

In 2009 the club beat Olimpi Rustavi and won the Georgian Cup.

=== 2010s ===
In January 2011, FC Dinamo Tbilisi was purchased by Georgian businessman Roman Pipia. That year, the club successfully played in the UEFA Europa League qualifying rounds, but they were not able to overcome AEK Athens in the play-off round.

After a bad performance in the Georgian championship of 2011–12, Dinamo could not qualify for any UEFA competitions for the first time. The new owner immediately started the modernization of the club starting with the reconstruction of the Digomi training ground. The Boris Paichadze Dinamo Arena was reconstructed as well. The pitch surface was changed with a new specially adapted surface for the local climate. Renovated Youths Football Academy also began.

The club were beaten 5–0 by Tottenham Hotspur in the Europa League play-off round in the 1st leg and again 3–0 the following week at White Hart Lane, thus crashing out 8–0 on aggregate.

After that in national competitions Dinamo won the double in the 2013, 2014 and 2016 seasons.

== Stadium ==
Construction of the Dinamo stadium started in autumn 1929 although the project was soon suspended. The construction was renewed in 1933 (chief architect – Archil Kurdiani). Construction is completed on 12 October 1935 with a maximum capacity of 23,000 spectators.

In 1960–1962 the stadium was reconstructed and the number of spectators increased to 36 000. After reconstruction the stadium was officially opened on 27 July 1962. Dinamo Tbilisi hosted FC Dynamo Leningrad in the Soviet championship and defeated it with minimal score 1–0.

The demand for a new and bigger stadium had increased due to the successful performance of Dinamo Tbilisi. This was the Communist time, when every problem had to be solved by the USSR supreme government body. The leader and the first secretary of Georgian Communist Party Eduard Shevardnadze was able to persuade official Moscow, that Georgia needed a bigger and better stadium for home matches. By the time the stadium was built, it had the third biggest capacity in the Soviet Union. It could fit 78,000 supporters and fulfill every standard and requirement of the Soviet Football Federation as well as the UEFA.

The first official match played after the stadium was built occurred on 29 September 1976. This was the UEFA Cup Winners' Cup 1/16 final match between Dinamo Tbilisi and Cardiff City. Dinamo won the opening game 3–0.

The next reconstruction of the stadium was held in 2006 (architects-Gia Kurdiani and Archil Kurdiani Junior) and the number of spectators was changed to 54,549. The stadium was opened with the European championship qualifying match. On 6 September 2006 the Georgia national team hosted the France national team and was defeated with the score 3–0. In 2012 the turf of Dinamo Arena was changed. Energy and irrigation systems were also fully rehabilitated. There was new lighting to satisfy demands for high standards. The VIP box was fully changed and fixed according to UEFA standards.

Even though the stadium's maximum capacity was 78,000, Georgian football fans can remember matches with more accommodation. For instance, in 1979 Dinamo was hosting one of the best British teams – Liverpool. The first match was played in England at Anfield, and Liverpool won 2–1. The attendance was 110,000 and their support played an important role in winning. Dinamo beat Liverpool 3–0 and qualified in the next round. In the Soviet Union Dinamo stadium kept the record with an average attendance of 45,000.

The record attendance was repeated in 1995 for Georgia vs Germany. The football clubs Spartak Moscow and Dynamo Kyiv often played their autumn international matches at this stadium.

Hundreds of Georgian, European and even South American stars played in Dinamo stadium. In 1985 the stadium hosted the qualifying stage of the Juniors World Cup. Cláudio Taffarel and Muller played for the Brazil national team.

In 1995 the stadium was renamed Boris Paichadze National Stadium after a major Georgian international footballer. It is home to the Georgia national football team. Holding lit torches, 80,000 fans came in 1981 to congratulate the team on their European Cup Winners Cup triumph.

The stadium hosted the 2015 UEFA Super Cup match between Barcelona and Sevilla. Barcelona won 5–4 in extra time.

== Football kits and sponsors ==
Years	Football kit	Shirt sponsor
2001–2009	Jako	Borjomi
2005–2009	Jako	Beko
2009–2011	Saller	VTB
2011–2012	Adidas	PrivatBank
2012–2013	Nike	PrivatBank
2013–2014	Nike	
2014–2020	Adidas	
2020–2023	Puma	betlive.com
2022–	Puma	Setanta Sports
2024–	Jako	Setanta Sports

== Players ==
=== Current squad ===
As of 21 November 2026

Note: Flags indicate national team as defined under FIFA eligibility rules; some limited exceptions apply. Players may hold more than one non-FIFA nationality.

No.	Pos.	Nation	Player
2	DF	GEO	Giorgi Gvasalia
3	DF	GEO	Aleksandre Kalandadze
4	DF	GEO	Nikoloz Ugrekhelidze
6	DF	BRA	Léo Santos
7	FW	GEO	Halid Doltmurziev
8	MF	BRA	Welton
10	MF	GEO	Giorgi Kharaishvili
11	FW	GEO	Mate Vatsadze
12	FW	GUI	Algassime Bah
13	DF	GRE	Marios Pourzitidis
14	FW	FRA	Maxime Do Couto
16	MF	GEO	Nikoloz Tkalia
17	DF	CYP	Paris Psaltis

No.	Pos.	Nation	Player
18	FW	GEO	Tornike Kvaratskhelia
20	GK	BRA	Lucas Flores
22	MF	GEO	Nika Ninua (captain)
24	MF	GHA	Barnes Osei
27	DF	BIH	Numan Kurdić
29	FW	GEO	Reziko Danelia
31	DF	GEO	Levan Kharabadze
32	MF	GEO	Luka Tsikolia
33	MF	FRA	Lyes Houri
34	FW	NGR	Mathew Gbomadu
37	GK	GEO	Mikheil Makatsaria
39	MF	GEO	Koba Kakashvili

=== Reserve team ===
Note: Flags indicate national team as defined under FIFA eligibility rules; some limited exceptions apply. Players may hold more than one non-FIFA nationality.

No.	Pos.	Nation	Player
15	DF	GAM	Albert Gomez
16	DF	GEO	Saba Akhalkatsi
19	DF	GEO	Dimitri Jakhia
21	MF	GEO	Raul Baratelia
25	MF	GEO	Tornike Gobronidze
26	MF	GEO	Gabriel Gogua
28	FW	GEO	Rati Aleksidze
30	DF	GEO	Giorgi Lomidze
35	DF	GEO	Shotiko Diakonidze

No.	Pos.	Nation	Player
36	FW	GEO	Sandro Mikautadze
38	GK	GEO	Dachi Chochoshvili
40	GK	GEO	Mate Ghaghvishvili
46	MF	GEO	Lazare Natenadze
45	FW	GEO	Levan Nachkebia
46	MF	GEO	Saba Nioradze
—	DF	GEO	Luka Salukvadze
—	MF	GEO	Nika Sikharulashvili
—	MF	GEO	Luka Bubuteishvili

=== Out on loan ===
Note: Flags indicate national team as defined under FIFA eligibility rules; some limited exceptions apply. Players may hold more than one non-FIFA nationality.

No.	Pos.	Nation	Player
—	GK	GEO	Mate Sauri (at Real Oviedo Vetusta)
—	DF	GEO	Mate Shatirishvili (at Samgurali Tskaltubo)

No.	Pos.	Nation	Player
—	FW	GEO	Temur Odikadze (at Samtredia)
—	FW	TUN	Iyed Hadj Khalifa (at Gori)

== Honours ==
Dinamo Tbilisi is by far the most successful football club in Georgia, having won the championship 18 times and the cup 13 times. Dinamo also was one of the major football clubs in Soviet football that has never been relegated from the top league, and alongside Ukrainian Dynamo Kyiv was the only club in Soviet era to win a European competition.

FC Dinamo Tbilisi honours
Type	Competition	Titles	Seasons
Domestic	Erovnuli Liga	19	1990, 1991, 1991–92, 1992–93, 1993–94, 1994–95, 1995–96, 1996–97, 1997–98, 1998–99, 2002–03, 2004–05, 2007–08, 2012–13, 2013–14, 2015–16, 2019, 2020, 2022
Domestic	Soviet Top League	2	1964, 1978
Domestic	Georgian Cup	13	1991–92, 1992–93, 1993–94, 1994–95, 1995–96, 1996–97, 2002–03, 2003–04, 2008–09, 2012–13, 2013–14, 2014–15, 2015–16
Domestic	Soviet Cup	2	1976, 1979
Domestic	Georgian Super Cup	9	1996, 1997, 1999, 2005, 2008, 2014, 2015, 2021, 2023
Continental	UEFA Cup Winners' Cup	1	1980–81

- record

=== Other international competitions ===
- Commonwealth of Independent States Cup (level 1)
  - Winners: (1) 2004

=== Individual player awards ===
Soviet Footballer of the Year

- (Soviet Union) David Kipiani – 1977
- (Soviet Union) Ramaz Shengelia – 1978
- (Soviet Union) Aleksandre Chivadze – 1980
- (Soviet Union) Ramaz Shengelia – 1981

Georgian Footballer of the Year

- (Georgian Soviet Socialist Republic) Temur Ketsbaia – 1990
- (Georgia (country)) Giorgi Kinkladze – 1993

European Championship winners

Three players have won the 1960 European Championship whilst at Dinamo Tbilisi:

- (Soviet Union) Givi Chokheli
- (Soviet Union) Zaur Kaloev
- (Soviet Union) Mikheil Meskhi

Olympic gold medalists

One player has won the Seoul 1988 Olympic gold medal whilst in Dinamo Tbilisi:

- (Soviet Union) Gela Ketashvili

== Managerial history ==
All managers of FC Dinamo Tbilisi:

Name	Dates
(Soviet Union) Grigol Pachulia	1935–1936
(France) Jules Limbeck	1936–1937
(Soviet Union) Aleksey Sokolov	1937–1939
(Soviet Union) Mikhail Butusov	1939–1940
(Soviet Union) Mikhail Minaev	1940
(Soviet Union) Pyotr Filippov	1940
(Soviet Union) Asir Galperin	1942–1945
(Soviet Union) Aleksey Sokolov	1943–1944
(Soviet Union) Andro Jordania	1945–1947
(Soviet Union) Mikheil Berdzenishvili	1948
(Soviet Union) Mikhail Minaev	1949
(Soviet Union) Aleksey Sokolov	1949–1950
(Georgia (country)) Mikhail Yakushin	1950–1953
(Georgia (country)) Boris Paichadze	1953–1954
(Georgia (country)) Grigol Gagua	1954
(Georgia (country)) Andro Jordania	1955
(Soviet Union) Gaioz Jejelava	1956–1957
(Georgia (country)) Vasily Sokolov	1958
(Georgia (country)) Andro Jordania	1959–1961
(Georgia (country)) Avtandil Gogoberidze	1961
(Georgia (country)) Nestor Chkhatarashvili	1962
(Georgia (country)) Mikhail Yakushin	1962–1964
(Georgia (country)) Gavriil Kachalin	1964–1965
(Georgia (country)) Aleksandre Kotrikadze	1966
(Georgia (country)) Viacheslav Soloviov	1967–1968
(Georgia (country)) Givi Chokheli	1969–1970
(Soviet Union) Gavriil Kachalin	1971–1972
(Soviet Union) Alexander Kotrikadze	1973
(Soviet Union) Givi Chokheli	1974
(Soviet Union) Mikhail Yakushin	1974–1975
(Soviet Union) Nodar Akhalkatsi	1976–1983
(Soviet Union) David Kipiani	1984–1985
(Soviet Union) Alexander Kotrikadze	1985
(Soviet Union) Nodar Akhalkatsi	1985–1986
(Soviet Union) Kakhi Asatiani	1987
(Soviet Union) German Zonin	1987–1988
(Soviet Union) / (Georgia (country)) David Kipiani	1988–1991
(Georgia (country)) Revaz Dzodzuashvili	1992
(Georgia (country)) Givi Nodia	1992–1994
(Georgia (country)) Temur Chkhaidze	1994
(Georgia (country)) Sergo Kutivadze	1994–1995
(Georgia (country)) Vaja Jvania	1995
(Georgia (country)) David Kipiani	1995–1997
(Georgia (country)) Nodar Akobia	1998
(Georgia (country)) Murtaz Khurtsilava	1998–1999
(Netherlands) Johan Boskamp	1999
(Georgia (country)) Otar Korghalidze	1999–2000
(Georgia (country)) Jemal Chimakadze	2000
(Georgia (country)) Revaz Arveladze	2000–2001
(Georgia (country)) Gocha Tkebuchava	2001
(Georgia (country)) Givi Nodia	2001
(Croatia) Ivo Šušak	2002–2004
(Georgia (country)) Gia Geguchadze	2004–2005
(Georgia (country)) Khvicha Kasrashvili	2005
(Georgia (country)) Kakhaber Tskhadadze	2005–2006
(Russia) Andrei Chernyshov	2006
(Georgia (country)) Kakhaber Kacharava	2006
(Czech Republic) Dušan Uhrin	2006–2008
(Germany) Rainer Zobel	2008–2009
(Georgia (country)) Kakhaber Kacharava	2009–2010
(Georgia (country)) Tamaz Samkharadze	2010
(Georgia (country)) Kakhaber Kacharava	2011
(Spain) Álex García	2011–2012
(Georgia (country)) Giorgi Devdariani	2012
(Georgia (country)) Nestor Mumladze	2012
(Czech Republic) Dušan Uhrin, Jr.	2012–2013
(Georgia (country)) Malkhaz Zhvania	2013–2014
(Czech Republic) Michal Bílek	2014
(Georgia (country)) Kakhaber Gogichaishvili	2014–2015
(Georgia (country)) Gia Geguchadze	2015–2016
(Slovakia) Juraj Jarábek	2016
(Ukraine) Vyacheslav Hroznyi	2016–2017
(Georgia (country)) Kakhaber Kacharava	2017–2018
(Georgia (country)) Zaur Svanadze	2018
(Spain) Félix Vicente	2019
(Georgia (country)) Kakhaber Chkhetiani	2020
(Spain) Xisco	2020
(Georgia (country)) Georgi Nemsadze	2020–2021
(Georgia (country)) Kakhaber Tskhadadze	2021–2022
(Georgia (country)) Giorgi Tchiabrishvili	2022–2023
(Spain) Andrés Carrasco	2023–2024
(Austria) Ferdinand Feldhofer	2024
(Georgia (country)) Vladimer Kakashvili	2024–2026
(Georgia (country)) Temur Ketsbaia	2026-

== European campaigns ==
=== European record ===
Competition	GP	W	D	L	GF	GA	+/-
UEFA Cup	66	29	10	27	83	102	–19
UEFA Cup Winners' Cup	21	11	3	7	30	17	+13
European Cup	4	1	0	3	7	8	–1
UEFA Champions League	37	13	5	19	45	53	–8
UEFA Intertoto Cup	6	2	2	2	12	8	+4
UEFA Europa League	34	16	5	13	49	50	–1
UEFA Conference League	11	3	2	6	15	19	–4
Total	178	75	27	77	241	257	-16

Season	Competition	Round	Club	Home	Away	Aggregate
1972–73	UEFA Cup	R1	(Netherlands) Twente	3–2	0–2	3–4
1973–74	UEFA Cup	R1	(Bulgaria) Slavia Sofia	4–1	0–2	4–3
1973–74	UEFA Cup	R2	(Socialist Federal Republic of Yugoslavia) OFK Beograd	3–0	5–1	8–1
1973–74	UEFA Cup	R3	(England) Tottenham Hotspur	1–1	1–5	2–6
1976–77	European Cup Winners' Cup	R1	(Wales) Cardiff City	3–0	0–1	3–1
1976–77	European Cup Winners' Cup	R2	(Hungary) MTK Budapest	1–4	0–1	1–5
1977–78	UEFA Cup	R1	(Italy) Inter Milan	0–0	1–0	1–0
1977–78	UEFA Cup	R2	(Denmark) KB	2–1	4–1	6–2
1977–78	UEFA Cup	R3	(Switzerland) Grasshopper Zürich	1–0	0–4	1–4
1978–79	UEFA Cup	R1	(Italy) Napoli	2–0	1–1	3–1
1978–79	UEFA Cup	R2	(Germany) Hertha BSC	1–0	0–2	1–2
1979–80	European Cup	R1	(England) Liverpool	3–0	1–2	4–2
1979–80	European Cup	R2	(Germany) Hamburg	2–3	1–3	3–6
1980–81	European Cup Winners' Cup	R1	(Greece) Kastoria	2–0	0–0	2–0
1980–81	European Cup Winners' Cup	R2	(Republic of Ireland) Waterford	4–0	1–0	5–0
1980–81	European Cup Winners' Cup	QF	(England) West Ham United	0–1	4–1	5–2
1980–81	European Cup Winners' Cup	SF	(Netherlands) Feyenoord	3–0	0–2	3–2
1980–81	European Cup Winners' Cup	Final	(East Germany) Carl Zeiss Jena	2–1		
1981–82	European Cup Winners' Cup	R1	(Austria) Grazer AK	2–0	2–2	4–2
1981–82	European Cup Winners' Cup	R2	(France) Bastia	3–1	1–1	4–2
1981–82	European Cup Winners' Cup	QF	(Poland) Legia Warsaw	1–0	1–0	2–0
1981–82	European Cup Winners' Cup	SF	(Belgium) Standard Liège	0–1	0–1	0–2
1982–83	UEFA Cup	R1	(Italy) Napoli	2–1	0–1	2–2 (a)
1987–88	UEFA Cup	R1	(Bulgaria) Lokomotiv Sofia	3–0	1–3	4–3
1987–88	UEFA Cup	R2	(Romania) Victoria București	0–0	2–1	2–1
1987–88	UEFA Cup	R3	(Germany) Werder Bremen	1–1	1–2	2–3
1993–94	UEFA Champions League	PR	(Northern Ireland) Linfield	2–1	1–1	3–2 (Note: Dinamo Tbilisi were ejected from the competition by UEFA after a failed attempt to bribe the referee for the first leg.)
1994–95	UEFA Cup	PR	(Romania) Universitatea Craiova	2–0	2–1	4–1
1994–95	UEFA Cup	R1	(Austria) Tirol Innsbruck	1–0	1–5	2–5
1995–96	UEFA Cup	PR	(Bulgaria) Botev Plovdiv	0–1	0–1	0–2
1996–97	UEFA Cup	PR	(Luxembourg) Grevenmacher	4–0	2–2	6–2
1996–97	UEFA Cup	QR	(Norway) Molde	2–1	0–0	2–1
1996–97	UEFA Cup	R1	(Russia) Torpedo Moscow	1–1	1–0	2–1
1996–97	UEFA Cup	R2	(Portugal) Boavista	1–0	0–5	1–5
1997–98	UEFA Champions League	QR1	(Northern Ireland) Crusaders	5–1	3–1	8–2
1997–98	UEFA Champions League	QR2	(Germany) Bayer Leverkusen	1–0	1–6	2–6
1997–98	UEFA Cup	R1	(Belarus) Slavia Mozyr	1–0	1–1	2–1
1997–98	UEFA Cup	R2	(Portugal) Braga	0–1	0–4	0–5
1998–99	UEFA Champions League	QR1	(Albania) Vllaznia Shkodër	3–0 (Note: First leg was finished 1–0 after normal time, but later awarded 3–0 by default.)	1–3	4–3
1998–99	UEFA Champions League	QR2	(Spain) Athletic Bilbao	2–1	0–1	2–2 (a)
1998–99	UEFA Cup	R1	(Netherlands) Willem II	0–3	0–3	0–6
1999–2000	UEFA Champions League	2QR	(Moldova) Zimbru Chișinău	2–1	0–2	2–3
2000	UEFA Intertoto Cup	R1	(Belgium) Standard Liège	2–2	1–1	3–3 (a)
2001–02	UEFA Cup	QR	(Belarus) BATE Borisov	2–1	0–4	2–5
2002–03	UEFA Cup	QR	(Estonia) TVMK Tallinn	4–1	1–0	5–1
2002–03	UEFA Cup	R1	(Czech Republic) Slovan Liberec	0–1	2–3	2–4
2003–04	UEFA Champions League	1QR	(Albania) Tirana	3–0	0–3	3–3 (2–4 p)
2004–05	UEFA Cup	1QR	(Belarus) BATE Borisov	1–0	3–2	4–2
2004–05	UEFA Cup	2QR	(Czech Republic) Slavia Prague	2–0	1–3	3–3 (a)
2004–05	UEFA Cup	R1	(Poland) Wisła Kraków	2–1	3–4	5–5 (a)
2004–05	UEFA Cup	Group D	(France) Sochaux-Montbéliard	0–2	—N/a	5th
2004–05	UEFA Cup	Group D	(England) Newcastle United	—N/a	0–2	5th
2004–05	UEFA Cup	Group D	(Portugal) Sporting CP	0–4	—N/a	5th
2004–05	UEFA Cup	Group D	(Greece) Panionios	—N/a	2–5	5th
2005–06	UEFA Champions League	1QR	(Estonia) Levadia Tallinn	2–0	0–1	2–1
2005–06	UEFA Champions League	2QR	(Denmark) Brøndby	0–2	1–3	1–5
2006	UEFA Intertoto Cup	R1	(Armenia) Kilikia	3–0	5–1	8–1
2006	UEFA Intertoto Cup	R2	(Austria) SV Ried	0–1	1–3	1–4
2007–08	UEFA Cup	1QR	(Liechtenstein) Vaduz	2–0	0–0	2–0
2007–08	UEFA Cup	2QR	(Austria) Rapid Wien	0–3	0–5	0–8
2008–09	UEFA Champions League	1QR	(Faroe Islands) NSÍ Runavík	3–0	0–1	3–1
2008–09	UEFA Champions League	2QR	(Greece) Panathinaikos	0–0	0–3	0–3
2009–10	UEFA Europa League	1QR	(Latvia) Liepājas Metalurgs	3–1	1–2	4–3
2009–10	UEFA Europa League	2QR	(Serbia) Red Star Belgrade	2–0	2–5	4–5
2010–11	UEFA Europa League	1QR	(Estonia) Flora	2–1	0–0	2–1
2010–11	UEFA Europa League	2QR	(Sweden) Gefle	2–1	2–1	4–2
2010–11	UEFA Europa League	3QR	(Austria) Sturm Graz	1–1	0–2	1–3
2011–12	UEFA Europa League	1QR	(Moldova) Milsami Orhei	2–0	3–1	5–1
2011–12	UEFA Europa League	2QR	(Wales) Llanelli Town	5–0	1–2	6–2
2011–12	UEFA Europa League	3QR	(Iceland) KR	2–0	4–1	6–1
2011–12	UEFA Europa League	PO	(Greece) AEK Athens	1–1	0–1	1–2
2013–14	UEFA Champions League	2QR	(Faroe Islands) EB/Streymur	6–1	3–1	9–1
2013–14	UEFA Champions League	3QR	(Romania) FCSB	0–2	1–1	1–3
2013–14	UEFA Europa League	PO	(England) Tottenham Hotspur	0–5	0–3	0–8
2014–15	UEFA Champions League	2QR	(Kazakhstan) Aktobe	0–1	0–3	0–4
2015–16	UEFA Europa League	1QR	(Azerbaijan) Gabala	2–1	0–2	2–3
2016–17	UEFA Champions League	2QR	(Armenia) Alashkert	2–0	1–1	3–1
2016–17	UEFA Champions League	3QR	(Croatia) Dinamo Zagreb	0–1	0–2	0–3
2016–17	UEFA Europa League	PO	(Greece) PAOK	0–3	0–2	0–5
2018–19	UEFA Europa League	1QR	(Slovakia) DAC 1904	1–2	1–1	2–3
2019–20	UEFA Europa League	1QR	(Andorra) UE Engordany	6–0	1–0	7–0
2019–20	UEFA Europa League	2QR	(Azerbaijan) Gabala	3–0	2–0	5–0
2019–20	UEFA Europa League	3QR	(Netherlands) Feyenoord	1–1	0–4	1–5
2020–21	UEFA Champions League	1QR	(Albania) Tirana	0–2	—N/a	0–2
2020–21	UEFA Europa League	2QR	(Wales) Connah's Quay Nomads	—N/a	1–0	1–0
2020–21	UEFA Europa League	3QR	(Faroe Islands) KÍ	—N/a	1–6	1–6
2021–22	UEFA Champions League	1QR	(Azerbaijan) Neftçi	1–2	1–2	2–4
2021–22	UEFA Europa Conference League	2QR	(Israel) Maccabi Haifa	1–2	1–5	2–7
2022–23	UEFA Europa Conference League	1QR	(Estonia) Paide Linnameeskond	2–3	2–1	4–4 (5–6 p)
2023–24	UEFA Champions League	1QR	(Kazakhstan) Astana	1–2	1–1	2–3
2023–24	UEFA Europa Conference League	2QR	(Malta) Ħamrun Spartans	0–1	1–2	1–3
2024–25	UEFA Conference League	1QR	(Montenegro) Mornar	1–1	1–2	2–3
2026–27	UEFA Conference League	1QR	(Luxembourg) Mondorf-les-Bains	1–1	2–1	3–2
2026–27	UEFA Conference League	2QR	(Lithuania) Žalgiris	3–0	2–7	5–7

=== UEFA club rankings ===
As of 12 March 2020

Rank	Team	Coefficient
230	(Belarus) Shakhtyor Soligorsk	4.750
231	(Bosnia and Herzegovina) Sarajevo	4.750
232	(Georgia (country)) Dinamo Tbilisi	4.750
233	(Republic of Ireland) Cork City	4.750
234	(Luxembourg) Fola Esch	4.750

== Seasons ==
Key

- P = Played
- W = Games won
- D = Games drawn
- L = Games lost
- F = Goals for
- A = Goals against
- Pts = Points
- Pos = Final position
- ERL = Erovnuli Liga
- STL = Soviet Top League
- SFL = Soviet First League
- R1 = First round
- R2 = Second round
- R3 = Third round
- QF = Quarter-finals
- SF = Semi-finals
- GS = Group stage
- QR1 = First Qualifying Round
- QR2 = Second Qualifying Round
- QR3 = Third Qualifying Round

Champions	Runners-up	Third place	Promoted

=== Soviet Union ===
Results of league and cup competitions by season
Season	Division	P	W	D	L	F	A	Pts	Pos	Soviet Cup	Super Cup	Federation Cup	UEFA FIFA	Name	Goals
Season	League									Soviet Cup	Super Cup	Federation Cup	UEFA FIFA	Top goalscorer	
1936	SFL	6	5	1	0	19	4	17	1st					Paichadze	6
1936	STL	7	3	3	1	14	9	16	3rd	Runners-up				Berdzenishvili	6
1937	STL	16	7	4	5	30	24	34	4th	Runners-up				Paichadze	8
1938	STL	25	11	9	5	53	38	31	6th	SF				Paichadze	14
1939	STL	26	14	5	7	60	41	33	2nd	SF				Paichadze	19
1940	STL	24	15	4	5	56	30	34	2nd	n/a				Jejelava; Berezhnoy	13
1941	STL	9	5	3	1	21	11	13		n/a				Paichadze	7
No championship in 1942–1944
1944										R16					
1945	STL	22	9	8	5	37	22	26	4th	QF				Antadze	9
1946	STL	22	15	3	4	47	26	33	3rd	Runners-up				Paichadze	15
1947	STL	24	14	5	5	57	30	33	3rd	QF				Jejelava; Gogoberidze	11
1948	STL	26	13	7	6	54	35	33	4th	SF				Jejelava	11
1949	STL	34	15	10	9	62	45	40	6th	QF				Zazroyev	19
1950	STL	36	20	7	9	78	50	47	3rd	R16				Gogoberidze	25
1951	STL	28	15	6	7	59	36	36	2nd	R32				Gogoberidze	16
1952	STL	13	5	6	2	19	12	16	4th	R16				Chkuaseli	7
1953	STL	20	11	5	4	39	24	27	2nd	QF				Gogoberidze	14
1954	STL	24	9	5	10	38	47	23	8th	R32				Gogoberidze	10
1955	STL	22	6	4	12	25	36	16	9th	QF				Gogoberidze	9
1956	STL	22	8	4	10	42	46	20	8th	n/a				Chkuaseli	11
1957	STL	22	8	5	9	27	33	21	7th	QF				Khasaia	7
1958	STL	22	8	3	11	34	55	19	9th	R16				Iamanidze	11
1959	STL	22	12	3	7	48	33	27	3rd	n/a				Kaloev	16
1960	STL	10	5	2	3	18	12	12	8th	Runners-up				Kaloev	20
1961	STL	30	13	7	10	50	30	33	7th	R16				Kaloev	14
1962	STL	22	10	8	4	29	20	28	3rd	R16				Kaloev	12
1963	STL	38	17	13	8	56	42	47	5th	R32				Barkaia	15
1964	STL	32	18	10	4	48	30	46	1st	R16				Datunashvili	13
1965	STL	32	12	12	8	37	30	36	6th	SF				Barkaia	9
1966	STL	36	13	14	9	47	34	40	7th	R32				Datunashvili	20
1967	STL	36	16	13	7	53	33	45	3rd	R16				Nodia	13
1968	STL	38	16	13	9	53	29	45	7th	R16				Gavasheli	22
1969	STL	26	12	11	3	34	17	35	3rd	R32				Nodia	10
1970	STL	32	14	8	10	43	30	36	4th	Runners-up				Nodia	17
1971	STL	30	14	8	8	33	33	36	3rd	QF				Nodia	7
1972	STL	30	12	11	7	41	34	35	3rd	QF			UEFA Cup – R1	Nodia	8
1973	STL	30	13	5/2	10	42	33	31	5th	R16			UEFA Cup – R3	Nodia	11
1974	STL	30	8	14	8	29	34	30	9th	SF				Machaidze	7
1975	STL	30	11	9	10	32	32	31	8th	SF				Kipiani	12
1976	STL	15	7	4	4	18	10	18	3rd					Kipiani	6
1976	STL	15	6	5	4	16	12	17	3rd	Winners			Cup Winners' Cup – R2	Kipiani; Chelebadze; Tsereteli	3
1977	STL	30	13	13	4	43	26	39	2nd	R32			UEFA Cup – R3	Kipiani	14
1978	STL	30	17	8	5	45	24	42	1st	QF			UEFA Cup – R2	Shengelia	15
1979	STL	34	19	12	3	54	27	46	4th	Winners			European Cup – R2	Chelebadze	9
1980	STL	34	16	7	11	51	32	39	4th	Runners-up				Shengelia	17
1981	STL	34	16	10	8	62	35	42	3rd	R16			Cup Winners' Cup – Winner	Shengelia	23
1982	STL	34	16	9	9	51	47	41	4th	SF			Cup Winners' Cup – SF	Shengelia	16
1983	STL	34	9	9	16	41	48	27	16th	R32			UEFA Cup – R1	Shengelia	11
1984	STL	34	14	8	12	36	41	36	7th	R16				Shengelia	9
1985	STL	34	11	10	13	34	39	32	8th	R32				Chivadze	7
1986	STL	30	12	9	9	36	36	33	5th	R16		GS		Chelebadze	10
1987	STL	30	9	7	14	31	40	25	13th	R16		QF	UEFA Cup – R3	Shengelia	9
1988	STL	30	9	5	16	28	37	23	14th	QF		GS		Guruli	9
1989	STL	30	6	13	11	27	32	25	11th	SF		GS		Kacharava	9
1990										R16					

=== Georgia ===
Results of league and cup competitions by season
Season	Division	P	W	D	L	F	A	Pts	Pos	Georgian Cup	Super Cup	UEFA FIFA	Name	Goals
Season	League									Georgian Cup	Super Cup	UEFA FIFA	Top goalscorer	
1990	UML	34	24	6	4	91	23	78	1st	SF			Guruli	23
1991	UML	19	14	5	0	45	9	47	1st	n/a			Kavelashvili	12
1991–92	UML	38	27	6	5	115	41	87	1st	Winners			Kacharava	26
1992–93	UML	32	25	2	5	92	35	77	1st	Winners			Arveladze	18
1993–94	UML	38	31	1	6	130	45	94	1st	Winners		Champions League – QR1	Kavelashvili; Iashvili	19
1994–95	UML	30	25	3	2	125	33	78	1st	Winners		UEFA Cup – R1	Iashvili	24
1995–96	UML	30	25	4	1	109	16	79	1st	Winners	Winners	UEFA Cup – QR1	Iashvili	26
1996–97	UML	30	26	3	1	101	23	81	1st	Winners	Winners	UEFA Cup – R2	Demetradze	26
1997–98	UML	30	24	4	2	86	15	71	1st	Runners-up	Runners-up	Champions League – QR2 UEFA Cup – R2	Khomeriki	23
1998–99	UML	30	24	5	1	91	17	77	1st	R16	Winners	Champions League – QR2 UEFA Cup – R1	Ashvetia	26
1999–00	UML	28	16	10	2	57	16	58	3rd	SF		Champions League – QR2	Ashvetia; Aleksidze	12
2000–01	UML	32	18	8	6	65	29	68	3rd	QF		Intertoto Cup – R1	Zirakishvili	21
2001–02	UML	32	19	6	7	57	20	63	3rd	SF		UEFA Cup – QR1	Bobokhidze	13
2002–03	UML	32	24	4	4	67	15	76	1st	Winners		UEFA Cup – R1	Daraselia Jr.	15
2003–04	UML	32	19	8	5	64	18	65	3rd	Winners		Champions League – QR1	Akhalaia	12
2004–05	UML	36	23	6	7	73	27	75	1st	R16	Winners	UEFA Cup – GS	Melkadze	27
2005–06	UML	30	20	4	6	61	22	64	3rd	QF		Champions League – QR2	Dvali	21
2006–07	UML	26	20	2	4	57	19	62	2nd	QF		Intertoto Cup – R2	Iashvili	27
2007–08	UML	26	23	1	2	67	18	70	1st	SF	Winners	UEFA Cup – QR2	Khutsishvili	16
2008–09	UML	30	19	6	5	70	21	63	2nd	Winners	Runners-up	Champions League – QR2	Merebashvili; Spasojević	13
2009–10	UML	36	22	8	6	62	19	74	2nd	Runners-up		Europa League – QR3	Akieremy	11
2010–11	UML	36	21	9	6	55	22	72	2nd	QF		Europa League – QR3	Koshkadze; Khmaladze	8
2011–12	UML	36	17	11	8	64	32	62	4th	R16		Europa League – Play-off	Xisco	15
2012–13	UML	32	24	6	2	88	23	78	1st	Winners	Runners-up		Xisco	24
2013–14	UML	32	21	5	6	67	23	68	1st	Winners	Winners	Champions League – QR3 Europa League – Play-off	Xisco	19
2014–15	UML	30	17	7	6	56	28	58	3rd	Winners	Winners	Champions League – QR2	Papunashvili	14
2015–16	UML	30	25	1	4	74	29	76	1st	Winners		Europa League – QR1	Kvilitaia	24
2016	UML	15	7	6	2	18	6	23	4th	SF		Champions League – QR3 Europa League – Play-off	Papunashvili	3
2017	ERL	36	23	6	7	79	29	75	2nd	SF			Mikeltadze	15
2018	ERL	36	21	6	9	73	38	69	2nd	SF		Europa League – QR1	Zivzivadze	22
2019	ERL	36	23	6	7	70	31	75	1st	R16		Europa League – QR3	Kutalia	19
2020	ERL	18	12	4	2	33	9	40	1st	R16	Runners-up	Champions League – QR1 Europa League – QR3	Kavtaradze	8
2021	ERL	36	21	7	8	59	28	70	2nd	R32	Winners	Champions League – QR1 Europa Conference League – QR2	Marušić	16
2022	ERL	36	24	8	4	73	29	80	1st	SF		Europa Conference League – QR1	Sikharulidze	12
2023	ERL	36	21	8	7	93	49	71	2nd	QF	Winners	Champions League – QR1 Europa Conference League – QR2	Marušić	17
2024	ERL	36	9	12	15	33	44	39	7th	Runners-up	Runners-up	Conference League – QR1	Salia; Gordeziani	6
2025	ERL	36	15	12	9	51	34	57	4th	R16			Morchiladze	12

Preceded by Valencia CF	UEFA Cup Winners' Cup Winner; 1981; Runner up: FC Carl Zeiss Jena	Succeeded by FC Barcelona
