= Mikheil Meskhi =

Georgian footballer

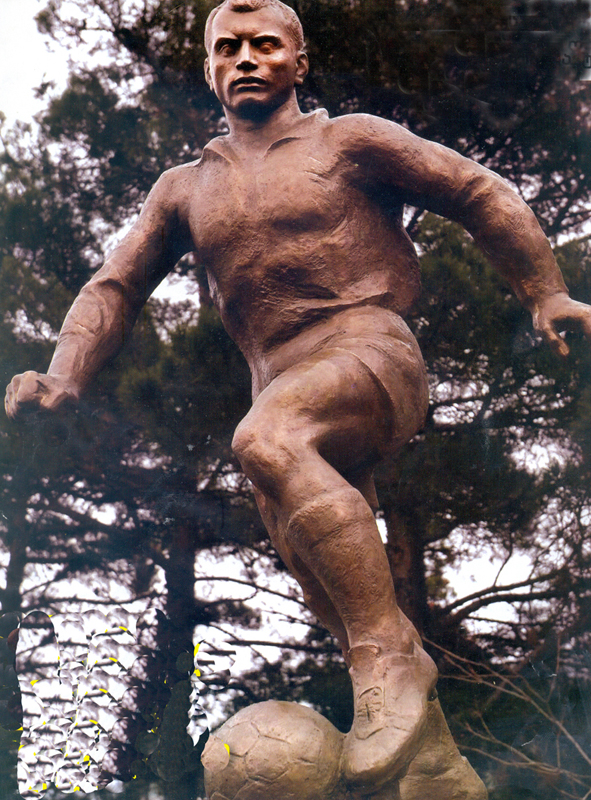
- Mikheil Meskhi statue at Mikheil Meskhi Stadium

Personal information
- Full name: Mikheil Meskhi
- Date of birth: 12 January 1937
- Place of birth: Tbilisi, USSR
- Date of death: 22 April 1991 (aged 54)
- Place of death: Tbilisi, Georgia
- Height: 1.69 m (5 ft 7 in)
- Position: Winger

Youth career
- School No. 35 Tbilisi
- FShM Tbilisi

Senior career*
Years	Team	Apps	(Gls)
1954–1969	FC Dinamo Tbilisi	285	(54)
1970	FC Lokomotivi Tbilisi	4	(0)
Total		289	(54)

International career
1959–1966	USSR	35	(4)
Medal record
Representing Soviet Union
UEFA European Championship
Winner	1960 France
- * Club domestic league appearances and goals

Mikheil Meskhi (Georgian: მიხეილ მესხი; Russian: Михаил Шалвович Месхи; 12 January 1937 – 22 April 1991) was a Georgian footballer. Nicknamed the "Georgian Garrincha" for his dazzling wing play, he was a creative force on the left flank for the Soviet Union. He was invited by the World XI side via the USSR Football Federation who replied he was injured and couldn't play— he was not told of the invitation.

== Career ==
He started playing football at the age of 14 in Tbilisi. Local well-known specialist Archil Kiknadze was Meskhi's first coach. His unique football talent was soon obvious in the 35th Football Schoolboys team he played in.

During his career he played for Dinamo Tbilisi (1954–1969) and Lokomotiv Tbilisi (1970). He earned 35 caps for the USSR national football team, and participated in the 1962 World Cup. He also appeared on the Soviet squad for the first-ever European Nations' Cup in 1960, which the Soviets won.

In 1998, Meskhi was voted the best player in the history of Georgian football, and a member of the 20th-century Georgian "Dream Team."
