= Shota Iamanidze =

Georgian-Soviet footballer (1937–1971)

Personal information
- Full name: Shota Iamanidze
- Date of birth: 15 March 1937
- Place of birth: Tbilisi, Georgian SSR
- Date of death: 15 October 1971 (aged 34)
- Place of death: Tbilisi, Georgian SSR
- Position: Midfielder

Senior career*
| Years | Team | Apps | (Gls) |
| 1954–1967 | Dinamo Tbilisi | 300 | (65) |

International career
| 1959 | USSR Olympic | 1 | (0) |
- * Club domestic league appearances and goals

Shota Iamanidze (Georgian: შოთა იამანიძე) (born 15 March 1937 in Tbilisi; died 15 October 1971 in Tbilisi) was a Georgian and Soviet football player.

Iamanidze died in a car accident at the age of 34.

== International career ==
Iamanidze made his debut for USSR on 13 September 1959 in the game against Bulgaria.

== Honours ==
=== Player ===
==== Club ====
Dinamo Tbilisi

- Soviet Top League: 1964
- Soviet Top League bronze medalist: 1959, 1962, 1967
