= Slava Metreveli =

Georgian footballer (1936–1998)

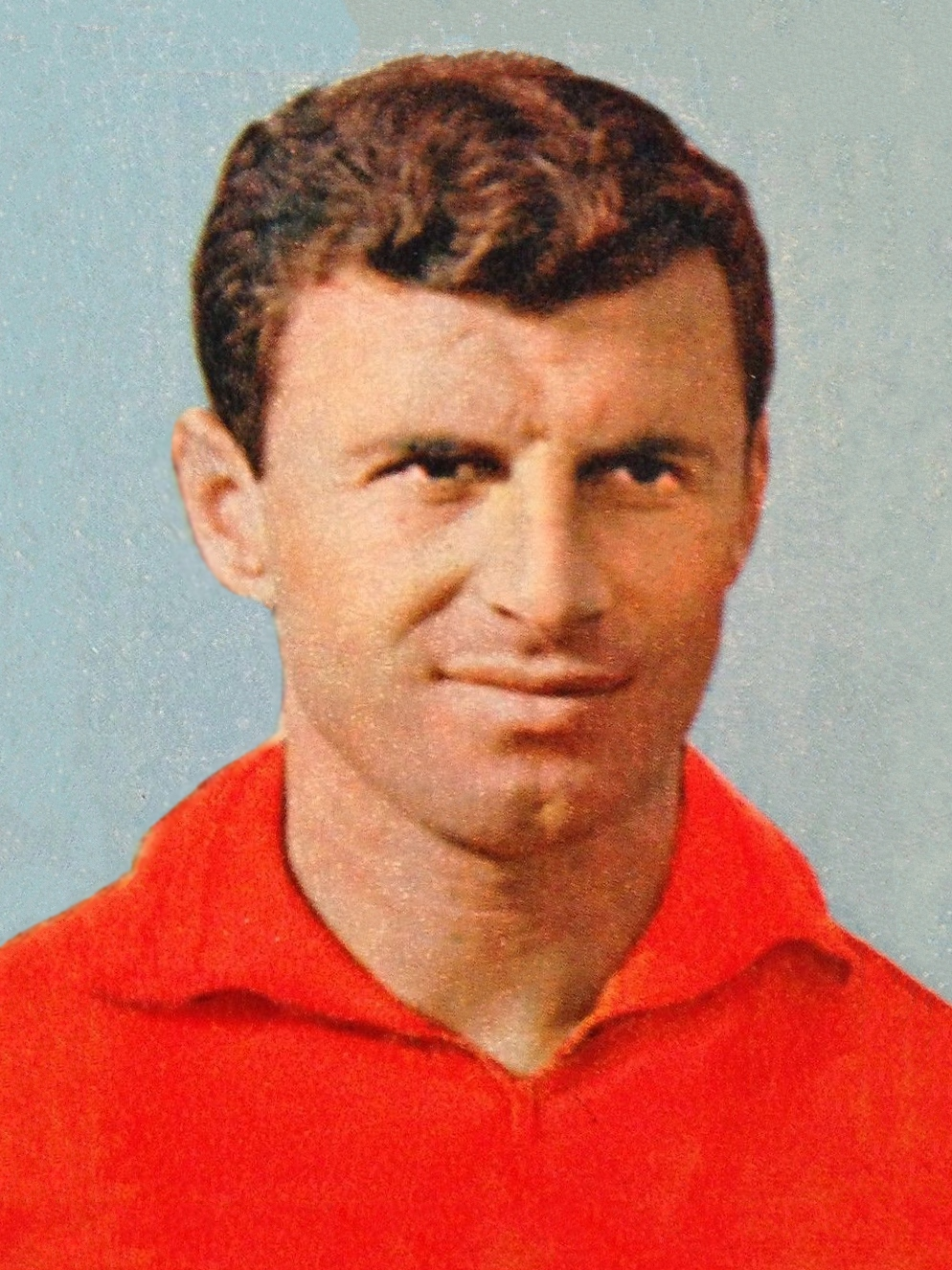
- Metreveli in 1966

Personal information
- Full name: Slava Kalistratovich Metreveli
- Date of birth: 30 May 1936
- Place of birth: Sochi, Russian SFSR, Soviet Union
- Date of death: 7 January 1998 (aged 61)
- Place of death: Tbilisi, Georgia
- Height: 1.72 m (5 ft 8 in)
- Position: Winger

Youth career
- 1952–1954: Trud Adler

Senior career*
Years	Team	Apps	(Gls)
1955–1956	Torpedo Gorky	49	(19)
1956–1962	Torpedo Moscow	138	(31)
1963–1971	Dinamo Tbilisi	237	(52)
Total		424	(102)

International career
1958–1970	USSR	48	(10)

Managerial career
- 1976–1977: Dinamo Tbilisi (assistant)
- 1978–1979: Dila Gori
Medal record
Representing Soviet Union
UEFA European Championship
Winner	1960 France
- * Club domestic league appearances and goals

Slava Kalistratovich Metreveli (Georgian: სლავა კალისტრატეს ძე მეტრეველი; Russian: Слава Калистратович Метревели, 30 May 1936 – 7 January 1998) was a Soviet and Georgian football player and manager.

Metreveli played most of his career for Torpedo Moscow (1956–1962) and Dinamo Tbilisi (1963–1971).

== International career ==
Metreveli played for Soviet Union national team (48 matches/10 goals) and was a participant at the 1962 FIFA World Cup, 1966 FIFA World Cup, 1970 FIFA World Cup, and at the 1960 European Nations' Cup, where the Soviet Union won the gold medal. In the latter, Metreveli scored in the final against Yugoslavia as they won 2–1.

== Honours ==
Torpedo Moscow

- Soviet Top League: 1960
- Soviet Cup: 1959–60

Dinamo Tbilisi

- Soviet Top League: 1964

Soviet Union

- UEFA European Football Championship: 1960

Individual

- UEFA European Championship Team of the Tournament: 1960,
- The best 33 football players of the Soviet Union (9): No. 1 (1958-1962, 1964, 1965, 1968); No. 2 (1957)
- Soviet Footballer of the Year: Third Place: 1964
