= 1958 Soviet Top League =

20th season of top-tier football league in Soviet Union

Soviet Top League
- Season: 1958

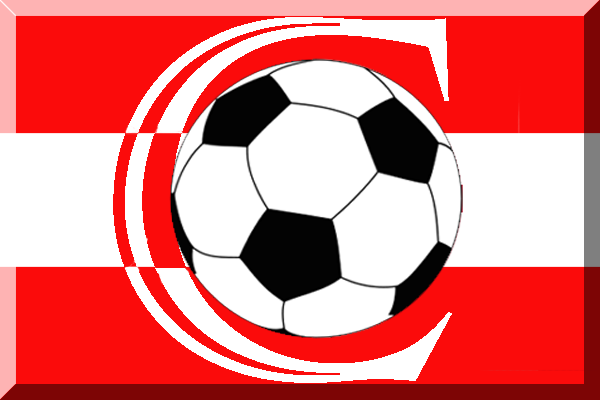
Spartak Moscow fantasy football flag

12 teams took part in the league with FC Spartak Moscow winning the championship.

== League standings ==
Pos	Team	Pld	W	D	L	GF	GA	GD	Pts	Qualification or relegation
1	(Russian Soviet Federative Socialist Republic) Spartak Moscow (C)	22	13	6	3	55	28	+27	32	League champions
2	(Russian Soviet Federative Socialist Republic) Dynamo Moscow	22	14	3	5	44	25	+19	31	
3	(Russian Soviet Federative Socialist Republic) CSK MO Moscow	22	9	9	4	40	25	+15	27	
4	(Russian Soviet Federative Socialist Republic) Zenit Leningrad	22	9	8	5	41	32	+9	26	
5	(Russian Soviet Federative Socialist Republic) Lokomotiv Moscow	22	9	6	7	48	34	+14	24	
6	(Ukrainian Soviet Socialist Republic) Dynamo Kiev	22	7	9	6	40	33	+7	23	
7	(Russian Soviet Federative Socialist Republic) Torpedo Moscow	22	7	8	7	51	42	+9	22	
8	(Ukrainian Soviet Socialist Republic) Shakhtyor Stalino	22	9	3	10	22	32	−10	21	
9	(Georgian Soviet Socialist Republic) Dynamo Tbilisi	22	8	3	11	34	55	−21	19	
10	(Russian Soviet Federative Socialist Republic) Krylia Sovetov Kuybyshev	22	6	6	10	23	29	−6	18	
11	(Moldavian Soviet Socialist Republic) Moldova Kishinyov	22	3	9	10	25	47	−22	15	
12	(Russian Soviet Federative Socialist Republic) Admiralteyets Leningrad (R)	22	3	0	19	22	63	−41	6	Relegation to Class B

Source: rsssf.com
(C) Champions; (R) Relegated

== Results ==
Home \ Away	ADM	CSK	DYK	DYN	DTB	KRY	LOK	MOL	SHA	SPA	TOR	ZEN
Admiralteyets Leningrad		0–3	1–2	1–2	3–1	2–0	0–3	4–3	0–1	0–4	0–5	2–4
CSK MO Moscow	3–1		2–2	0–0	5–1	1–0	0–0	2–2	4–2	0–2	3–3	2–2
Dynamo Kiev	5–1	1–1		2–0	4–0	2–1	1–1	2–2	1–0	1–1	3–3	1–1
Dynamo Moscow	3–1	2–1	2–2		3–2	3–0	2–0	1–0	4–1	0–1	3–2	1–4
Dynamo Tbilisi	2–0	2–1	4–3	1–6		3–0	2–1	1–1	2–0	1–4	1–6	1–1
Krylia Sovetov Kuybyshev	3–0	1–0	0–0	0–0	3–0		4–1	1–1	2–0	1–3	0–2	1–2
Lokomotiv Moscow	2–1	1–3	2–4	3–1	3–4	0–0		8–1	3–0	2–2	4–1	0–0
Moldova Chisinau	1–0	0–4	2–0	0–2	1–1	1–0	1–1		2–3	1–1	1–3	1–1
Shakhtyor Stalino	4–3	1–2	1–0	1–0	0–1	1–1	2–1	1–0		1–1	0–0	1–0
Spartak Moscow	4–1	0–0	3–2	1–2	5–2	4–1	0–1	4–2	2–0		3–2	5–1
Torpedo Moscow	4–1	1–2	2–1	2–5	3–1	2–2	3–4	2–2	1–2	3–3		1–1
Zenit Leningrad	4–0	1–1	3–1	0–2	2–1	1–2	2–7	5–0	2–0	4–2	0–0	

Legend: Blue = home team win; Yellow = draw; Red = away team win.

== Top scorer ==
19 goals

- Anatoli Ilyin (Spartak Moscow)

14 goals

- Valentin Ivanov (Torpedo Moscow)

13 goals

- Gennadi Gusarov (Torpedo Moscow)

11 goals

- Valeri Urin (Dynamo Moscow)

10 goals

- German Apukhtin (CSK MO Moscow)
- Adamas Golodets (Dynamo Kyiv)
- Viktor Voroshilov (Lokomotiv Moscow)
- Shota Iamanidze (Dinamo Tbilisi)

9 goals

- Valentin Bubukin (Lokomotiv Moscow)
- Yuri Falin (Torpedo Moscow)
- Alakbar Mammadov (Dynamo Moscow)
- Nikita Simonyan (Spartak Moscow)
