= Avtandil Ch'k'uaseli =

Soviet footballer (1931–1994)

Personal information
- Full name: Avtandil Noyevich Ch'k'uaseli
- Date of birth: 31 December 1931
- Place of birth: Tbilisi, USSR
- Date of death: 12 September 1994 (aged 62)
- Place of death: Tbilisi, Georgia
- Position: Striker

Senior career*
Years	Team	Apps	(Gls)
1950–1959	FC Dinamo Tbilisi	91	(30)

International career
1952	USSR	1	(0)
- * Club domestic league appearances and goals

Avtandil Noyevich Ch'k'uaseli (Russian: Автандил Ноевич Чкуасели; Georgian: ავთანდილ ჭკუასელი; 31 December 1931 – 12 September 1994) was a Soviet Georgian football player.

Ch'k'uaseli played his only game for USSR on 22 July 1952 in the 1952 Olympics game against Yugoslavia.
