= 1964 Soviet Top League =

26th season of top-tier football league in Soviet Union

Class A First Group
- Season: 1964
- Dates: 27 March–8 November; 18 November–22 November (playoffs)
- Champions: Dinamo Tbilisi (1st title)
- Relegated: Volga Gorky; Kairat Alma-Ata; Shinnik Yaroslavl; Moldova Chisinau
- European Cup: none
- Cup Winners' Cup: Dynamo Kyiv
- Matches played: 274
- Goals scored: 544 (1.99 per match)
- Best Player: Valery Voronin (Torpedo M)
- Top goalscorer: Vladimir Fedotov (CSKA)
- Best goalkeeper: Viktor Bannikov (Dynamo Kv)

The 1964 Class A First Group was the 26th season of the Soviet football championship at top division and the 15th for Class A. The season started on 27 March 1964 and finished on 8 November 1964. Upon conclusion of the regular season, at the end of November in warmer Tashkent took place additional play-offs for the first place and the 13th place.

- 17 teams took part in the league with FC Dinamo Tbilisi winning the championship.
- Volga Gorky and Shinnik Yaroslavl were the newly promoted clubs.
- According to the rules, if two teams had the equal number of points the winner was decided by the final match between them. The game between Dinamo and Torpedo took place in Tashkent, Uzbekistan SSR with FC Dinamo Tbilisi winning 4-1 after extra time.
- FC Dynamo Kyiv qualified for CWC 1965–66 by beating Krylya Sovetov Kuybyshev 1–0 in the national cup this year becoming the first Soviet football club in European competitions.
- The defending champions Dynamo Moscow placed seventh.

== League standings ==
Pos	Team	Pld	W	D	L	GF	GA	GD	Pts	Qualification
1	(Georgian Soviet Socialist Republic) Dinamo Tbilisi (C)	32	18	10	4	48	30	+18	46	League champions
2	(Russian Soviet Federative Socialist Republic) Torpedo Moscow	32	19	8	5	52	19	+33	46	
3	(Russian Soviet Federative Socialist Republic) CSKA Moscow	32	16	11	5	49	23	+26	43	
4	(Russian Soviet Federative Socialist Republic) SKA Rostov-on-Don	32	16	6	10	40	28	+12	38	
5	(Ukrainian Soviet Socialist Republic) Shakhtyor Donetsk	32	13	11	8	35	26	+9	37	
6	(Ukrainian Soviet Socialist Republic) Dinamo Kiev	32	10	16	6	42	29	+13	36	Qualification for Cup Winners' Cup first round
7	(Russian Soviet Federative Socialist Republic) Dinamo Moscow	32	12	10	10	33	31	+2	34	
8	(Russian Soviet Federative Socialist Republic) Spartak Moscow	32	12	8	12	34	32	+2	32	
9	(Byelorussian Soviet Socialist Republic) Dinamo Minsk	32	7	17	8	24	21	+3	31	
10	(Russian Soviet Federative Socialist Republic) Krylya Sovetov Kuybyshev	32	7	14	11	24	35	−11	28	
11	(Russian Soviet Federative Socialist Republic) Zenit Leningrad	32	9	9	14	30	35	−5	27	
12	(Azerbaijan Soviet Socialist Republic) Neftyanik Baku	32	8	11	13	25	30	−5	27	
13	(Georgian Soviet Socialist Republic) Torpedo Kutaisi	32	10	7	15	20	37	−17	27	
14	(Russian Soviet Federative Socialist Republic) Volga Gorky (R)	32	7	13	12	19	38	−19	27	Relegation to Class A Second Group
15	(Kazakh Soviet Socialist Republic) Kairat Alma-Ata (R)	32	8	10	14	23	27	−4	26	Relegation to Class A Second Group
16	(Russian Soviet Federative Socialist Republic) Shinnik Yaroslavl (R)	32	6	9	17	20	48	−28	21	Relegation to Class A Second Group
17	(Moldavian Soviet Socialist Republic) Moldova Chișinău (R)	32	6	6	20	15	44	−29	18	Relegation to Class A Second Group

Source: rsssf.com
(C) Champions; (R) Relegated

== Results ==
Home \ Away	CSK	DYK	DMN	DYN	DTB	KAI	KRY	MOL	NEF	TOR	SHA	SHI	SKA	SPA	TKU	VOL	ZEN
CSKA Moscow		1–2	0–0	1–1	4–1	2–0	4–2	1–0	0–0	2–1	0–2	10–2	1–0	2–0	4–0	5–2	0–0
Dinamo Kiev	1–1		1–0	2–1	1–1	3–1	0–0	4–1	1–1	1–2	1–1	2–0	0–1	2–2	3–0	1–1	1–0
Dinamo Minsk	0–0	1–1		0–0	0–0	1–0	0–0	4–0	0–2	0–3	0–0	1–1	2–0	1–0	0–0	0–1	1–1
Dinamo Moscow	1–2	1–1	2–1		3–1	0–0	1–0	2–1	1–1	2–1	2–0	1–0	3–2	2–1	0–2	0–1	0–1
Dinamo Tbilisi	3–0	2–1	3–1	2–1		2–2	1–1	1–0	4–3	3–1	2–1	3–1	2–1	1–0	1–0	2–0	2–0
Kairat Alma-Ata	1–1	1–0	2–0	0–0	0–0		0–1	0–1	1–0	1–2	2–2	1–0	0–0	0–1	2–0	2–0	2–2
Krylya Sovetov Kuybyshev	0–0	1–1	0–0	4–0	3–3	0–2		3–1	0–0	0–4	0–0	1–0	0–1	1–0	0–0	1–1	2–1
Moldova Chisinau	0–0	1–3	0–0	0–3	1–0	1–0	1–0		2–0	0–2	1–0	0–0	0–1	1–1	0–1	0–0	2–1
Neftyanik Baku	1–1	1–0	0–2	0–1	0–1	0–0	0–0	2–0		3–1	3–1	0–0	0–1	0–4	2–0	1–0	2–1
Torpedo Moscow	1–0	1–1	1–0	0–0	1–1	1–0	2–0	3–0	1–0		0–0	3–1	0–0	5–0	1–1	1–0	2–0
Shakhtyor Donetsk	0–0	0–0	0–5	1–2	2–1	1–1	3–0	1–0	1–0	0–0		2–0	1–2	3–0	3–0	2–0	2–1
Shinnik Yaroslavl	1–2	2–2	0–0	0–0	0–1	1–0	0–1	1–1	1–0	1–4	0–2		1–1	0–1	1–0	0–0	1–0
SKA Rostov-on-Don	1–0	2–2	1–1	2–1	1–2	1–0	2–0	1–0	1–1	0–2	1–0	2–0		0–1	7–0	0–1	2–1
Spartak Moscow	0–1	1–1	0–0	1–0	0–1	0–2	2–1	2–1	2–2	0–1	1–1	1–0	0–1		0–0	0–0	2–1
Torpedo Kutaisi	0–1	0–0	0–1	1–0	1–1	2–0	0–0	2–0	1–0	1–0	0–1	0–2	4–1	0–3		3–0	0–2
Volga Gorky	0–1	0–3	1–1	2–2	0–0	1–0	1–1	1–0	0–0	1–1	0–1	3–2	0–4	1–4	1–0		0–0
Zenit Leningrad	0–2	1–0	1–1	0–0	0–0	1–0	4–1	3–0	1–0	0–4	1–1	4–0	2–0	0–4	0–1	0–0	

Legend: Blue = home team win; Yellow = draw; Red = away team win.

== Top scorers ==
16 goals

- Vladimir Fedotov (CSKA)

15 goals

- Viktor Kanevskyi (Dinamo Kiev)

14 goals

- Valentin Ivanov (Torpedo Moscow)

13 goals

- Ilya Datunashvili (Dinamo Tbilisi)

12 goals

- Slava Metreveli (Dinamo Tbilisi)

10 goals

- Oleg Kopayev (SKA Rostov-on-Don)
- Eduard Malofeyev (Dinamo Minsk)
- Viktor Ponedelnik (SKA Rostov-on-Don)
- Oleg Sergeyev (Torpedo Moscow)

9 goals

- Yuri Ananchenko (Shakhtyor)
- Vladimir Barkaya (Dinamo Tbilisi)
- Igor Chislenko (Dynamo Moscow)
- Valeryan Chkhartishvili (Torpedo Kutaisi)
- Boris Kazakov (CSKA)
