= Gocha Gavasheli =

Soviet Georgian footballer

Georgi Gavasheli
Personal information
- Full name: Georgi Grigoryevich Gavasheli
- Date of birth: 18 February 1947
- Place of birth: Gagra, Georgian SSR
- Date of death: 25 December 1997 (aged 50)
- Place of death: Urengoy, Russia
- Height: 1.77 m (5 ft 9 1/2 in)
- Positions: Midfielder; forward

Senior career*
Years	Team	Apps	(Gls)
1965	FC Dinamo Tbilisi	0	(0)
1966–1967	FC Lokomotivi Tbilisi	56	(8)
1967–1976	FC Dinamo Tbilisi	183	(48)
- * Club domestic league appearances and goals

Georgi (Gocha) Grigoryevich Gavasheli (Russian: Георгий (Гоча) Григорьевич Гавашели; Georgian: გიორგი გავაშელი; born 18 February 1947 in Gagra; died 25 December 1997 in Urengoy, Russia in an accident) was a Soviet Georgian football player.

== Honours ==
- Soviet Top League top scorer: 22 goals (1968).
- Soviet Cup winner: 1976.
