= Roman Pipia =

- Born: 8 April 1966 (age 60); Gagra, Georgian SSR, Soviet Union
- Occupations: founder of Loyal Capital Group, owner and president of Dinamo Tbilisi.

Roman Pipia (Georgian: რომან ფიფია; born 8 April 1966 in Gagra) is a Georgian businessman, founder of Loyal Capital Group and owner and president of Georgian Umaglesi Liga club Dinamo Tbilisi – several-time winner of Georgian championship and the most prominent football club throughout Georgia. Pipia is married with 3 children.

== Early life and education ==
Roman Pipia was born in Gagra, Georgia, on 8 April 1966. After graduating from high school in 1983 he moved to Saratov, and pursued higher level education. Pipia received his bachelor's degree at Russian University of Consumer Cooperatives (former Moscow University of Consumer Cooperatives) in 1996 and became PHD of economic sciences at Saratov State Academy of Economics.

== Business career ==
Having started his career in the Russian Federation, Pipia has been actively involved in various business sectors throughout Russia as a CEO or shareholder/owner. He became general director of Saratov Liquor and Vodka distillery syndicate in 1996. With Pipia at the helm, the enterprise turned into the most innovative and successful company among other players on the market.

Pipia has been involved in agricultural businesses as well, taking part in development of agricultural infrastructure and subsidizing agricultural companies: Pipia became CEO of regional catering company DzernoPovoldjain 2001. In 2002, he became the head of Agroros Corporation, the main operating field of which is preserving and grinding corn. Since 2007, Pipia has been expanding businesses in Georgia, having implemented several highly profitable projects. (Loyal Capital Group, Hyatt Regency, Rustavi enterprise "Azot", Reorganization of FC Dinamo Tbilisi)

== Social Responsibility/Philanthropy ==
Pipia has been actively involved in charity work, he generated 4-year program for multiple-children families, providing them with free bread. The program budget surpassed 23 MLN Roubles.

For the first time in its 60-year history, football club Sokol was able to join Russian Premier League with Pipia at the helm in 1997–2001.

Together with Russian Federation, Pipia's charity work has been expanded in Georgia as well, implementing various social projects aiming to enhance cultural and sporting lives of Georgians. While financing Vanessa Mae charity concert in Russia, Pipia presented Georgians with worldwide famous Shakira concert on Christmas in 2007. Increasingly, when struggling with a lack of corn supplies during the Georgian Rose Revolution in 2003, state Minister Zurab Zhvania requested Georgian businessmen abroad to support their country, Pipia sent large amount of corn yielding eradicate imminent food crisis.

Various projects have been implemented to support sports and healthy lifestyle on Pipia's initiative, including the act of financially supporting Georgian National Rugby team during the years.

Last but not least, among Pipia's numerous philanthropic activities, he has provided support to the Georgian Orthodox Church and its charity projects.

== Dinamo Tbilisi ==
Aiming to develop Georgian football, Pipia bought the leading football club in Georgia – FC Dinamo Tbilisi. Soon afterwards large amounts of construction works started to perfect the infrastructure of Andro Zhordania Dinamo Tbilisi training Base to European standards. On Pipia's initiative Georgia's most important stadium Dinamo Arena was reconstructed to follow the FIFA-UEFA standards yielding the possibility to host the Europe Super Bowl.

Another large-scale social project was implemented with slogan Future Starts Here in 2013: Dinamo Football Academy. Dinamo Football Academy stated purpose was to support Georgian Football development, raise future generations of players, and promote healthy lifestyle among Georgians. The modernized academy scales to be the largest among Pipia's football projects with standards more similar to what is viewed as higher European standards in terms of scale and resources. Young people are able to advance their football skills for free under patronage of professional Georgian coaches as well as foreign specialists who have been invited exclusively by the football academy.
