= 1947 Soviet Top League =

10th season of top-tier football league in Soviet Union

Soviet Top League
- Season: 1947

13 teams took part in the league with CSKA Moscow winning the championship.

== League standings ==
Pos	Team	Pld	W	D	L	GF	GA	GD	Pts
1	CDKA Moscow	24	17	6	1	61	16	+45	40
2	Dynamo Moscow	24	19	2	3	57	15	+42	40
3	Dynamo Tbilisi	24	14	5	5	57	30	+27	33
4	Dynamo Kiev	24	9	9	6	27	31	−4	27
5	Torpedo Moscow	24	9	6	9	36	29	+7	24
6	Zenit Leningrad	24	10	2	12	35	49	−14	22
7	Krylia Sovetov Kuybyshev	24	8	6	10	32	45	−13	22
8	Spartak Moscow	24	6	9	9	34	26	+8	21
9	Traktor Stalingrad	24	7	7	10	34	39	−5	21
10	Dynamo Leningrad	24	7	5	12	32	48	−16	19
11	Krylia Sovetov Moscow	24	6	6	12	22	37	−15	18
12	Dynamo Minsk	24	5	4	15	17	46	−29	14
13	VVS Moscow	24	3	5	16	21	54	−33	11

Source: rsssf.com

== Results ==
Home \ Away	CDK	DYK	DLE	DMN	DYN	DTB	KRY	KSM	SPA	TOR	TRA	VVS	ZEN
CDKA Moscow		1–0	7–0	1–0	1–0	1–0	7–0	2–2	1–0	1–0	2–2	3–0	8–1
Dynamo Kiev	0–0		1–1	1–0	0–4	0–4	1–1	2–0	0–0	0–0	2–1	1–0	3–2
Dynamo Leningrad	2–2	0–1		3–1	1–2	1–1	3–0	0–0	1–0	0–4	2–4	2–1	0–1
Dynamo Minsk	1–2	0–0	1–3		0–3	0–1	2–3	1–0	1–8	3–2	2–0	1–0	1–2
Dynamo Moscow	3–1	2–1	5–2	1–0		3–0	0–1	0–1	1–0	2–0	4–1	2–0	4–0
Dynamo Tbilisi	2–2	2–2	5–1	6–0	0–4		4–0	2–1	2–1	4–1	1–1	1–0	5–2
Krylia Sovetov Kuybyshev	1–2	2–2	1–0	1–0	1–1	2–5		4–1	2–0	0–2	2–1	2–2	1–2
Krylia Sovetov Moscow	0–5	1–2	3–4	0–1	1–1	0–2	2–1		1–0	1–0	1–1	1–0	2–1
Spartak Moscow	1–1	0–0	2–2	5–0	1–2	1–0	1–1	0–0		2–6	2–1	6–0	0–0
Torpedo Moscow	0–1	4–0	1–0	0–0	1–3	3–0	0–2	2–1	1–1		0–0	2–2	1–2
Traktor Stalingrad	0–5	0–2	3–0	3–1	0–2	3–3	3–3	1–1	1–0	0–1		3–0 (Note: Match awarded.)	2–1
VVS Moscow	0–2	2–3	0–3	0–0	1–5	1–5	2–1	2–0	1–1	3–3	1–6		3–1
Zenit Leningrad	1–3	4–3	2–1	1–1	1–3	0–2	2–0	3–2	1–2	1–2	1–0	3–0	

Legend: Blue = home team win; Yellow = draw; Red = away team win.

== Top scorers ==
14 goals

- Vsevolod Bobrov (CDKA Moscow)
- Valentin Nikolayev (CDKA Moscow)
- Sergei Solovyov (Dynamo Moscow)

11 goals

- Gaioz Jejelava (Dinamo Tbilisi)
- Vasili Kartsev (Dynamo Moscow)
- Vasili Lotkov (Dynamo Leningrad)

10 goals

- Avtandil Gogoberidze (Dinamo Tbilisi)
- Ivan Komarov (Zenit Leningrad)

9 goals

- Nikolay Dementyev (Spartak Moscow)
- Vladimir Dyomin (CDKA Moscow)
- Dmitri Sinyakov (Krylia Sovetov Kuybyshev)
