= 1951 Soviet Top League =

14th season of top-tier football league in Soviet Union

Soviet Top League
- Season: 1951

Following are the results of the 1951 Soviet Top League football championship. Fifteen teams took part, with CDSA Moscow winning the championship.

== League standings ==
Pos	Team	Pld	W	D	L	GF	GA	GD	Pts	Qualification
1	(Russian Soviet Federative Socialist Republic) CDSA Moscow (C)	28	18	7	3	53	19	+34	43	League champions
2	(Georgian Soviet Socialist Republic) Dynamo Tbilisi	28	15	6	7	59	36	+23	36	
3	(Ukrainian Soviet Socialist Republic) Shakhtyor Stalino	28	12	10	6	44	30	+14	34	
4	(Russian Soviet Federative Socialist Republic) Krylia Sovetov Kuybyshev	28	11	12	5	34	25	+9	34	
5	(Russian Soviet Federative Socialist Republic) Dynamo Moscow	28	13	6	9	62	41	+21	32	
6	(Russian Soviet Federative Socialist Republic) Spartak Moscow	28	13	5	10	50	35	+15	31	
7	(Russian Soviet Federative Socialist Republic) Zenit Leningrad	28	10	8	10	36	40	−4	28	
8	(Ukrainian Soviet Socialist Republic) Dynamo Kiev	28	9	9	10	43	39	+4	27	
9	(Russian Soviet Federative Socialist Republic) Dynamo Leningrad	28	11	5	12	46	53	−7	27	
10	(Russian Soviet Federative Socialist Republic) VVS Moscow	28	11	4	13	44	56	−12	26	
11	(Latvian Soviet Socialist Republic) Daugava Riga	28	9	7	12	44	44	0	25	
12	(Russian Soviet Federative Socialist Republic) Torpedo Moscow	28	8	8	12	37	48	−11	24	
13	(Russian Soviet Federative Socialist Republic) VMS Moscow (R)	28	7	9	12	30	50	−20	23	Relegation to Class B
14	(Georgian Soviet Socialist Republic) Spartak Tbilisi (R)	28	7	2	19	32	56	−24	16	Relegation to Class B
15	(Russian Soviet Federative Socialist Republic) Torpedo Gorky (R)	28	4	6	18	20	62	−42	14	Relegation to Class B

Source: rsssf.com
(C) Champions; (R) Relegated

== Results ==
Home \ Away	CDS	DAU	DYK	DLE	DYN	DTB	KRY	SHA	SPA	STB	TGR	TOR	VMS	VVS	ZEN
CDSA Moscow		1–1	2–0	5–2	2–1	3–1	1–1	1–1	1–0	3–0	2–0	3–1	4–0	3–1	2–0
Daugava Riga	0–0		0–2	1–1	2–2	0–1	0–2	5–0	2–3	3–1	1–0	4–1	2–3	1–3	4–1
Dynamo Kiev	1–1	2–4		3–0	2–2	1–1	2–2	1–3	1–0	3–2	2–0	4–4	4–0	1–2	0–0
Dynamo Leningrad	0–2	1–3	2–0		3–2	1–3	2–2	5–4	0–2	3–0	1–0	0–0	2–0	2–4	1–1
Dynamo Moscow	0–2	5–2	1–0	2–1		2–0	1–1	3–4	1–2	3–1	1–1	0–1	5–1	5–1	3–0
Dynamo Tbilisi	2–0	3–0	2–1	2–2	0–2		1–1	1–1	3–1	6–0	5–0	7–1	1–0	3–3	4–2
Krylia Sovetov Kuybyshev	2–1	0–0	1–0	3–0	1–1	2–3		0–1	0–0	1–0	2–0	2–1	2–2	3–1	1–1
Shakhtyor Stalino	0–1	3–1	0–1	2–0	1–4	4–0	0–0		0–1	1–0	8–0	0–0	1–1	2–0	3–3
Spartak Moscow	0–1	2–1	0–0	3–1	1–3	4–2	0–0	1–1		2–3	2–0	1–2	5–3	3–1	1–2
Spartak Tbilisi	1–2	3–1	0–3	2–3	3–2	0–2	1–0	1–2	0–4		0–2	1–1	0–0	1–3	1–2
Torpedo Gorky	0–5	2–1	1–1	1–6	1–6	2–1	0–1	0–0	1–3	1–2		1–1	0–0	3–1	1–1
Torpedo Moscow	1–1	1–1	3–5	1–2	2–0	1–3	4–1	0–0	1–0	0–2	2–1		1–2	2–3	3–1
VMS Moscow	1–0	1–1	2–2	0–1	2–4	0–0	1–2	0–1	1–6	2–1	2–1	2–0		2–1	0–0
VVS Moscow	1–1	0–2	3–1	1–2	3–0	1–0	1–0	0–0	2–2	0–6	3–1	0–2	3–2		2–4
Zenit Leningrad	1–3	0–1	1–0	4–2	1–1	1–2	0–1	0–1	2–1	1–0	2–0	2–1	0–0	3–1	

Legend: Blue = home team win; Yellow = draw; Red = away team win.

== Top scorers ==
16 goals

- Avtandil Gogoberidze (Dinamo Tbilisi)

15 goals

- Konstantin Beskov (Dynamo Moscow)
- Aleksandr Ponomarev (Shakhtyor Stalino)

14 goals

- Fyodor Dashkov (Dynamo Kiev)

13 goals

- Aleksei Kolobov (Dynamo Leningrad)
- Sergei Korshunov (VVS Moscow)

12 goals

- Zaur Kaloyev (Spartak Tbilisi)
- Viktor Zhylin (Zenit Leningrad)

10 goals

- Gennadi Bondarenko (Dynamo Leningrad)
- Aleksei Grinin (CDSA Moscow)
- Nikita Simonyan (Spartak Moscow)
- Vyacheslav Solovyov (CDSA Moscow)
- Vasili Trofimov (Dynamo Moscow)
- Pavlo Vinkovatov (Dynamo Kiev)
- Viktor Voroshilov (Krylia Sovetov Kuybyshev)
