= 1941 Soviet Top League =

7th season of top-tier football league in Soviet Union

Soviet Top League
- Season: 1941

The 1941 Soviet Football Championship Group A (Russian: Чемпионат СССР по футболу 1941 (группа «А»)) was the 7th season in the Soviet first-tier football competition. Dynamo Moscow were the defending champions. The competition started on April 27, 1941, and was expected to finish on November 9, 1941.

It was cancelled with the Nazi German invasion of the Soviet Union on June 22. Two matches took place two days after the start of hostilities on June 24, 1941, in Stalino (today Donetsk) and Tbilisi.

The USSR football department of the USSR All-Union Council of Physical Culture adopted a decision about early termination of the season due to the announced mobilization of athletes (sportsmen) to the Workers'-Peasants' Red Army.

According to the Russian and Soviet journalist Aksel Vartanyan, the Soviet teams of masters were preserved and competed in the Moscow city football competitions.

== Teams ==
=== Team changes ===
Promoted from 1940 Gruppa B	Relegated from 1940 Gruppa A
Krasnaya Zaria Leningrad; Spartak Leningrad	None

Two teams were promoted from the 1940 Gruppa B competitions: Krasnaya Zaria Leningrad as the 1940 Gruppa B winner and Spartak Leningrad as the 1940 Gruppa B runner-up. Both teams were returning to the Gruppa A competitions after one and two seasons of absence, respectively.

=== Additional ivitees ===
- Other added clubs (specially invited): (Dinamo Minsk 1940 Gruppa B 6th place, new clubs Spartak Odessa and Spartak Kharkiv)

=== Mergers ===
- Out of Moscovite Lokomotiv, Torpedo, Metallurg, and Krylya Sovetov were formed teams Profsoyuzy-1 and Profsoyuzy-2.
- Out of Leningradis Zenit, Avangard (Gruppa B), and Krasnaya Zaria (Gruppa B) were formed teams Profsoyuz of Leningrad which was renamed again into Zenit.
- Merger of Stakhanovets Stalino and Traktor Stalingrad was cancelled.

=== Name changes ===
- CDKA (now CSKA) participated as Krasnaya Armiya

== League standings as of June 24, 1941 ==
Pos	Team	Pld	W	D	L	GF	GA	GR	Pts	Qualification
1	Dynamo Moscow	10	6	3	1	28	12	2.333	15	
2	Dynamo Tbilisi	10	6	3	1	22	13	1.692	15	
3	Dynamo Leningrad	11	5	4	2	20	11	1.818	14	
4	Traktor Stalingrad	12	3	7	2	16	16	1.000	13	
5	Stakhanovets Stalino	11	6	0	5	13	13	1.000	12	
6	Krasnaya Armiya Moscow	9	5	1	3	15	13	1.154	11	
7	Spartak Moscow	9	4	2	3	17	12	1.417	10	
8	Dynamo Kyiv	9	4	2	3	16	14	1.143	10	
9	Profsoyuzy-2 Moscow	10	3	4	3	11	10	1.100	10	
10	Spartak Odessa	10	3	2	5	16	22	0.727	8	
11	Zenit Leningrad	8	2	3	3	12	14	0.857	7	
12	Spartak Leningrad	9	1	4	4	8	16	0.500	6	
13	Dynamo Minsk	10	3	0	7	10	21	0.476	6	
14	Spartak Kharkiv	9	2	1	6	7	19	0.368	5	
15	Profsoyuzy-1 Moscow	9	1	2	6	10	15	0.667	4	Relegation

Source: rsssf.com
Rules for classification: 1) Points; 2) Goal ratio
- Note: there were no commercial sports in the Soviet Union; all "teams of masters" were ultimately subsidized by the state through sports societies.

== Results ==
Home \ Away	KAM	DYK	DLE	DMN	DYN	DTB	P1M	P2M	SPK	SPL	SPA	SPO	STS	TRA	ZEN
Krasnaya Armiya Moscow			0–2	1–2	2–5						2–0			1–1	
Dynamo Kiev						3–0				2–3					2–2
Dynamo Leningrad		1–1		3–0				1–1		3–0					
Dynamo Minsk					2–3					2–1		1–3	1–2		
Dynamo Moscow			3–1				2–1	2–2	7–0				0–2	1–1	
Dynamo Tbilisi			3–2	3–0				1–0	3–2			2–2	3–0	1–1	
Profsoyuzy-1 Moscow		1–2		0–1				1–2		1–1			1–0		2–3
Profsoyuzy-2 Moscow	0–1									0–0	2–2	3–1	0–1		
Spartak Kharkiv	1–3	2–0	1–1	2–0				0–1			1–5		0–1		
Spartak Leningrad						1–4									
Spartak Moscow		3–0		3–1	1–1										
Spartak Odessa	2–3	0–3			0–4					3–1					4–3
Stakhanovets Stalino	0–2		1–3								3–0	1–0		2–3	
Traktor Stalingrad		2–3	1–1				1–1		1–0	1–1	1–3	1–1			2–1
Zenit Leningrad			0–2			2–2				0–0	1–0				

Source: football.lg.ua, www.sport-express.ru
Legend: Blue = home team win; Yellow = draw; Red = away team win.

== Top scorers ==
8 goals

- Viktor Matveyev (Traktor Stalingrad)
- Aleksei Sokolov (Spartak Moscow)

7 goals

- Sergei Solovyov (Dynamo Moscow)

6 goals

- Boris Paichadze (Dinamo Tbilisi)
- Viktor Panyukov (Dinamo Tbilisi)
- Pyotr Shcherbakov (Spartak Odessa)

5 goals

- Aleksandr Fyodorov (Dynamo Leningrad)
- Mikhail Semichastny (Dynamo Moscow)

4 goals

- Ilya Bizyukov (Dynamo Leningrad)
- Pavel Kornilov (Spartak Moscow)
- Ivan Mitronov (Profsoyuzy-2 Moscow)
- Konstantin Sazonov (Dynamo Leningrad)
