= Ilia Datunashvili =

Soviet Georgian footballer (1937–2022)

Ilya Datunashvili
Personal information
- Full name: Ilya Ilyich Datunashvili
- Date of birth: 1 September 1937
- Place of birth: Kobuleti, Georgian SSR, Soviet Union
- Date of death: 11 February 2022 (aged 84)
- Height: 1.72 m (5 ft 8 in)
- Position: Forward

Youth career
- Pioneers and School Students Park Batumi

Senior career*
Years	Team	Apps	(Gls)
1954–1956	Kolmeurne Lanchkhuti		
1958	Lokomotivi Kutaisi		
1959–1968	Dinamo Tbilisi	199	(46)
- * Club domestic league appearances and goals

Ilya Ilyich Datunashvili (Russian: Илья Ильич Датунашвили; Georgian: ილია დათუნაშვილი; 1 September 1937 – 11 February 2022) was a Soviet Georgian football player. Among his many achievements, there is one for which he is remembered most often: He scored five goals in a 5–0 away win against Dinamo Tbilisi's Soviet-time arch-rivals Ararat Yerevan of Armenia. He died on 11 February 2022, at the age of 84.

== Honours ==
Dinamo Tbilisi

- Soviet Top League: 1964; third place 1962, 1967

Individual

- Soviet Top League top scorer: 20 goals (1966)
- Top-33 season best players list: 1964, 1966 (both #2)
