= 1940 Soviet Top League =

6th season of top-tier football league in Soviet Union

Soviet Top League
- Season: 1940

Following are the results of the 1940 Soviet Top League football championship.

== Standings ==
Pos	Republic	Team	Pld	W	D	L	GF	GA	GD	Pts
1	Russian SFSR	Dynamo Moscow	24	16	4	4	74	30	+44	36
2	Georgian SSR	Dynamo Tbilisi	24	15	4	5	56	30	+26	34
3	Russian SFSR	Spartak Moscow	24	13	5	6	54	35	+19	31
4	Russian SFSR	CDKA Moscow	24	10	9	5	46	35	+11	29
5	Russian SFSR	Dynamo Leningrad	24	11	5	8	47	44	+3	27
6	Russian SFSR	Lokomotiv Moscow	24	10	5	9	36	52	−16	25
7	Russian SFSR	Traktor Stalingrad	24	8	7	9	38	37	+1	23
8	Ukrainian SSR	Dynamo Kiev	24	6	9	9	32	49	−17	21
9	Russian SFSR	Krylia Sovetov Moscow	24	6	7	11	26	34	−8	19
10	Russian SFSR	Zenit Leningrad	24	6	6	12	37	42	−5	18
11	Russian SFSR	Torpedo Moscow	24	6	6	12	36	50	−14	18
12	Ukrainian SSR	Stakhanovets Stalino	24	6	4	14	32	43	−11	16
13	Russian SFSR	Metallurg Moscow	24	5	5	14	37	70	−33	15
14	Georgian SSR	Lokomotiv Tbilisi	0	0	0	0	0	0	0	0

Source: rsssf.com

== Results ==
Home \ Away	CDK	DYK	DLE	DYN	DTB	KSM	LOK	MTM	SPA	STS	TOR	TRA	ZEN
CDKA Moscow		1–1	5–0	2–4	3–3	2–0	0–0	3–1	0–5	3–1	1–1	2–0	3–1
Dinamo Kiev	4–1		2–1	0–7	0–3	0–0	1–3	0–0	2–2	1–1	1–0	2–3	4–1
Dinamo Leningrad	0–0	1–1		3–1	1–1	2–2	6–1	3–1	2–0	3–0	3–4	1–3	2–1
Dinamo Moscow	2–1	8–5	3–0		2–0	2–0	6–1	2–3	2–2	1–2	4–0	3–2	+:-
Dinamo Tbilisi	2–0	6–1	5–0	1–0		1–0	2–2	6–2	1–2	2–1	1–2	2–2	4–2
Krylia Sovetov Moscow	2–4	0–0	1–2	1–1	0–1		0–1	5–0	0–2	3–0	2–0	1–0	1–1
Lokomotiv Moscow	2–2	2–1	1–4	0–5	1–0	2–0		1–0	1–1	2–2	3–1	3–1	1–6
Metallurg Moscow	1–5	1–1	1–3	2–8	1–3	5–1	3–1		5–3	1–0	3–3	1–5	1–2
Spartak Moscow	1–3	5–1	3–1	1–5	1–2	0–0	2–0	7–1		2–1	2–1	1–2	2–0
Stakhanovets Stalino	0–1	1–2	1–1	2–5	0–2	1–2	1–2	4–2	0–2		3–0	3–0	1–0
Torpedo Moscow	1–1	2–0	3–4	2–2	2–3	1–1	4–3	3–1	1–3	0–3		2–1	1–2
Traktor Stalingrad	1–1	0–2	2–3	0–0	2–1	1–2	4–2	0–0	1–1	4–2	1–1		2–0
Zenit Leningrad	2–2	0–0	2–1	0–1	3–4	5–2	0–1	1–1	3–4	2–2	2–1	1–1	

Legend: Blue = home team win; Yellow = draw; Red = away team win.

== Top scorers ==
21 goals

- Grigory Fedotov (CDKA Moscow)
- Sergei Solovyov (Dynamo Moscow)

15 goals

- Nikolay Dementyev (Dynamo Moscow)

14 goals

- Aleksandr Ponomarev (Traktor Stalingrad)

13 goals

- Gaioz Jejelava (Dinamo Tbilisi)
- Pavel Kornilov (Spartak Moscow)
- Viktor Semyonov (Spartak Moscow)
- Mikhail Semichastny (Dynamo Moscow)

12 goals

- Boris Paichadze (Dinamo Tbilisi)

11 goals

- Viktor Berezhnoy (Dinamo Tbilisi)
