= Vladimer Barkaia =

Soviet footballer (1937–2022)

Personal information
- Full name: Vladimer Aleksandrovich Barkaia
- Date of birth: 29 July 1937
- Place of birth: Gagra, Abkhaz ASSR, Georgian SSR, USSR
- Date of death: 30 December 2022 (aged 85)
- Place of death: Tbilisi, Georgia
- Position: Striker

Youth career
- DYuSSh Gagra

Senior career*
Years	Team	Apps	(Gls)
1957–1967	Dinamo Tbilisi	226	(68)

International career
1965	USSR	2	(2)

Managerial career
- 1968–1969: Dinamo Tbilisi (assistant)
- * Club domestic league appearances and goals

Vladimer Barkaia (Georgian: ვლადიმერ ბარქაია; Russian: Владимир Александрович Баркая; 29 July 1937 – 30 December 2022) was a Soviet footballer from Georgia who played as a striker.

== Career ==
Born in Gagra, Barkaia played for FC Burevestnik Gagra from 1953 to 1955 and Dinamo Tbilisi from 1957 to 1967. During his career in FC Dinamo Tbilisi, Barkaia played 226 matches and scored 68 goals. Barkaya made his debut for USSR on 27 June 1965 in a 1966 FIFA World Cup qualifier against Denmark and scored twice on his debut. He also played in a friendly against Brazil team starring Pelé. He was an assistant coach for Dinamo Tbilisi from 1968 to 1969. He also graduated from the Tbilisi State University with a degree in Economics in 1963.

== Personal life and death ==
Barkaia died on 30 December 2022, at the age of 85.

== Honours ==
- Soviet Top League winner: 1964.

== Awards ==
- Master of Sports, USSR, 1959
- Order of Honor, Georgia, 1997
- Knight of Sports, Georgia, 2014
