= Avtandil Gogoberidze =

Georgian and Soviet footballer

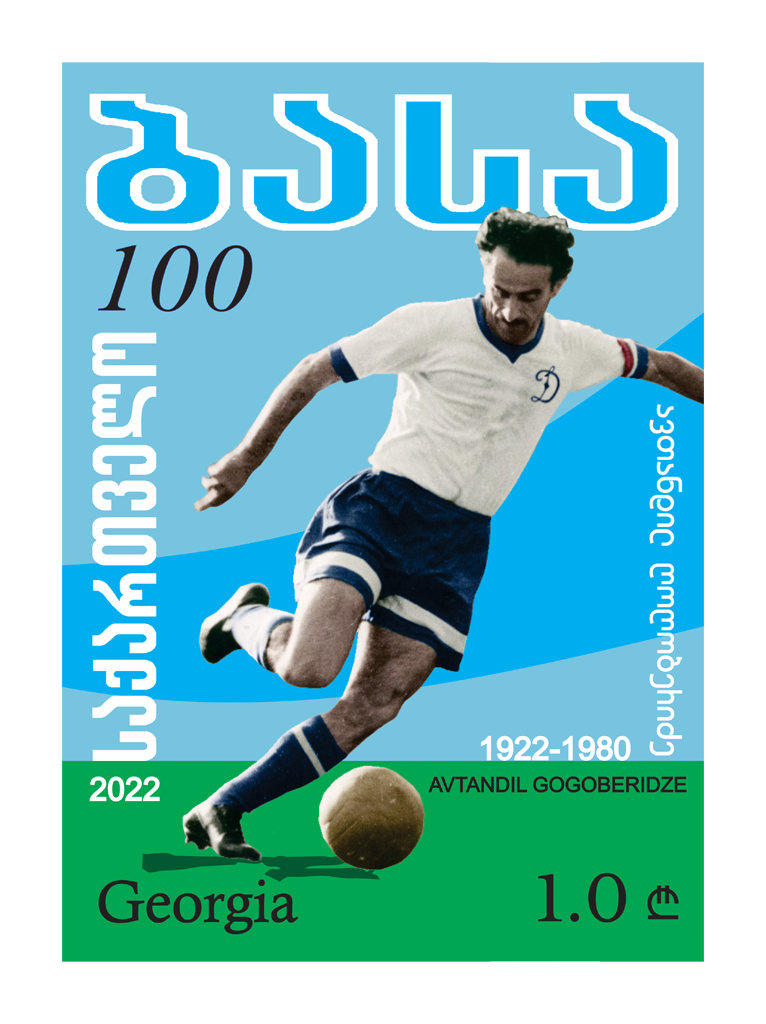
- Gogoberidze on a 2022 stamp of Georgia

Personal information
- Full name: Avtandil Nikolozis dze Gogoberidze
- Date of birth: 3 August 1922
- Place of birth: Sukhumi, SSR Abkhazia
- Date of death: 20 November 1980 (aged 58)
- Place of death: Tbilisi, Soviet Union
- Height: 1.71 m (5 ft 7 in)
- Position: Striker

Senior career*
Years	Team	Apps	(Gls)
1939	Pischevik Sukhumi	?	
1940–1941	FC Dinamo Sokhumi	?	
1945–1961	FC Dinamo Tbilisi	344	(128)

International career
1952–1954	USSR	3	(1)

Managerial career
- 1961–1962: FC Dinamo Tbilisi
- 1963–1965: FC Dinamo Tbilisi (director)
- * Club domestic league appearances and goals

Avtandil Nikolozis dze Gogoberidze (Georgian: ავთანდილ ნიკოლოზის ძე ღოღობერიძე, Russian: Автандил Николаевич Гогоберидзе; 3 August 1922, Sukhumi – 20 November 1980, Tbilisi), nicknamed "Basa", was a Soviet and Georgian football player. He was a Grigory Fedotov club member. His son Tengiz Gogoberidze played one game in the Soviet Top League for FC Dinamo Tbilisi.

== International career ==
Gogoberidze made his debut for USSR on 15 July 1952 in the 1952 Olympics game against Bulgaria.
