= Viktor Berezhniy =

Ukrainian basketball player (born 1961)

Viktor Berezhnyi
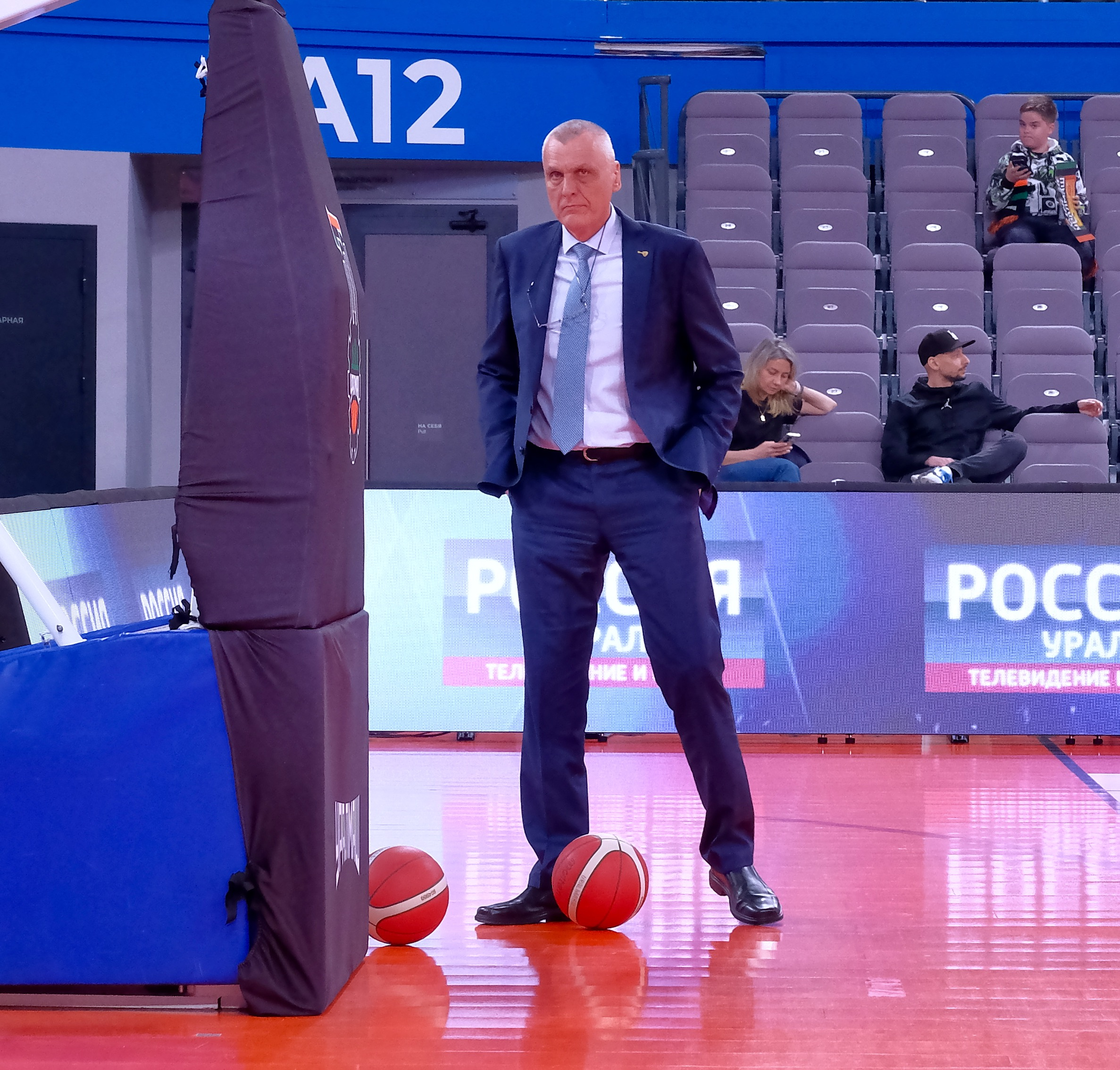
- Viktor Berezhnyi (2022)

Personal information
- Nationality: Soviet, Ukrainian
- Born: 20 February 1961 (age 65) Kyiv, Ukrainian SSR, Soviet Union

Sport
- Sport: Basketball
Medal record
Men's basketball
Representing Soviet Union
European U-18 Championship
Gold medal – first place	1980 Yugoslavia	U-18 Team
European Championship for Cadets
Bronze medal – third place	1977 France	U-16 Team

Viktor Berezhnyi (born 20 February 1961) is a Ukrainian former basketball player. He competed in the men's tournament at the 1992 Summer Olympics.
