= 1946 Soviet Top League =

9th season of top-tier football league in Soviet Union

Soviet Top League
- Season: 1946

12 teams took part in the league with CSKA Moscow winning the championship.

== League standings ==
Pos	Team	Pld	W	D	L	GF	GA	GD	Pts
1	CDKA Moscow	22	17	3	2	55	13	+42	37
2	Dynamo Moscow	22	16	1	5	68	17	+51	33
3	Dynamo Tbilisi	22	15	3	4	47	26	+21	33
4	Torpedo Moscow	22	11	5	6	44	29	+15	27
5	Dynamo Leningrad	22	10	4	8	37	35	+2	24
6	Spartak Moscow	22	8	5	9	38	40	−2	21
7	Krylia Sovetov Moscow	22	5	8	9	14	24	−10	18
8	Traktor Stalingrad	22	6	4	12	22	40	−18	16
9	Zenit Leningrad	22	5	5	12	22	45	−23	15
10	Krylia Sovetov Kuybyshev	22	3	8	11	16	52	−36	14
11	Dynamo Minsk	22	3	7	12	22	43	−21	13
12	Dynamo Kiev	22	4	5	13	18	39	−21	13

Source: rsssf.com

== Results ==
Home \ Away	CDK	DYK	DLE	DMN	DYN	DTB	KRY	KSM	SPA	TOR	TRA	ZEN
CDKA Moscow		1–0	8–1	3–0	1–0	2–0	2–0	1–2	5–2	1–2	3–0	1–1
Dynamo Kiev	0–3		1–0	1–0	0–3	0–3	0–0	0–2	1–2	2–2	0–1	3–3
Dynamo Leningrad	1–1	1–0		3–1	0–3	2–2	4–1	2–0	5–2	1–1	0–1	2–3
Dynamo Minsk	1–3	2–0	0–2		0–2	3–3	1–1	0–1	0–0	2–4	1–1	2–1
Dynamo Moscow	0–2	6–1	4–0	5–0		4–1	7–0	3–0	5–0	1–3	1–0	1–0
Dynamo Tbilisi	1–1	1–0	1–0	3–1	3–2		2–0	1–0	1–0	2–0	5–1	3–1
Krylia Sovetov Kuybyshev	1–4	1–1	0–4	1–1	0–8	1–0		0–0	1–1	3–2	1–1	1–2
Krylia Sovetov Moscow	0–2	0–1	3–3	0–0	0–3	1–2	2–0		0–0	0–0	0–2	0–0
Spartak Moscow	1–3	2–2	2–1	6–0	1–4	1–3	5–0	0–0		1–4	3–1	2–0
Torpedo Moscow	0–4	1–0	0–1	1–1	4–1	4–3	3–0	0–2	3–1		1–2	6–1
Traktor Stalingrad	0–1	2–3	0–1	2–1	0–4	2–4	2–2	1–1	1–3	0–3		2–0
Zenit Leningrad	0–3	3–2	1–3	0–5	1–1	0–3	0–2	3–0	0–3	0–0	2–0	

Legend: Blue = home team win; Yellow = draw; Red = away team win.

== Top scorers ==
18 goals

- Aleksandr Ponomarev (Torpedo Moscow)

17 goals

- Vasili Kartsev (Dynamo Moscow)
- Sergei Solovyov (Dynamo Moscow)

16 goals

- Valentin Nikolayev (CDKA Moscow)

15 goals

- Boris Paichadze (Dinamo Tbilisi)

12 goals

- Grigory Fedotov (CDKA Moscow)

10 goals

- Yevgeni Arkhangelsky (Dynamo Leningrad)
- Viktor Panyukov (Dinamo Tbilisi)

9 goals

- Vasili Lotkov (Dynamo Leningrad)
- Sergei Salnikov (Spartak Moscow)
- Vasili Trofimov (Dynamo Moscow)
