= Gaioz Jejelava =

Soviet and Georgian football player

Personal information
- Full name: Gaioz Ivanes dze Jejelava
- Date of birth: 29 December 1914
- Place of birth: Tbilisi, Russian Empire
- Date of death: 16 March 2005 (aged 90)
- Place of death: Tbilisi, Georgia
- Height: 1.64 m (5 ft 5 in)
- Position: Winger

Senior career*
Years	Team	Apps	(Gls)
1931−1934	TSPO Tbilisi	-	(-)
1935−1936	Locomotive Tbilisi	7	(6)
1937−1948	Dinamo Tbilisi	144	(61)

Managerial career
- 1950–1951: VVS Moscow
- 1956–1957: Dinamo Tbilisi
- * Club domestic league appearances and goals

Gaioz Jejelava (Georgian: გაიოზ ჯეჯელავა) (born 29 December 1914 in Tbilisi; died 16 March 2005 in Tbilisi) was a Soviet and Georgian football player.

Jejelava, a skillful winger, was one of the leaders of Dinamo Tbilisi alongside Boris Paichadze during 11 years spell with the club.

Later Jejelava managed VVS Moscow and Dinamo Tbilisi, but without any success, spending two seasons with each of the clubs.

Jejelava died in March 2005, in Tbilisi.
