= 1949 Soviet Top League =

12th season of top-tier football league in Soviet Union

Soviet Top League
- Season: 1949

Following are the results of the 1949 Soviet Top League football championship.

== Standings ==
Pos	Republic	Team	Pld	W	D	L	GF	GA	GD	Pts
1	Russian SFSR	Dynamo Moscow	34	26	5	3	104	30	+74	57
2	Russian SFSR	CDKA Moscow	34	22	7	5	86	30	+56	51
3	Russian SFSR	Spartak Moscow	34	21	7	6	93	43	+50	49
4	Russian SFSR	Torpedo Moscow	34	16	10	8	64	42	+22	42
5	Russian SFSR	Zenit Leningrad	34	17	8	9	48	48	0	42
6	Georgian SSR	Dynamo Tbilisi	34	15	10	9	62	45	+17	40
7	Ukrainian SSR	Dynamo Kiev	34	17	6	11	48	47	+1	40
8	Russian SFSR	VVS Moscow	34	13	9	12	48	42	+6	35
9	Russian SFSR	Dynamo Leningrad	34	12	10	12	53	53	0	34
10	Russian SFSR	Krylia Sovetov Kuybyshev	34	10	12	12	40	61	−21	32
11	Russian SFSR	Lokomotiv Moscow	34	11	8	15	59	56	+3	30
12	Ukrainian SSR	Lokomotiv Kharkov	34	10	10	14	41	51	−10	30
13	Russian SFSR	Torpedo Stalingrad	34	8	10	16	36	52	−16	26
14	Azerbaijan SSR	Neftyanik Baku	34	6	12	16	26	42	−16	24
15	Byelorussian SSR	Dinamo Minsk	34	8	6	20	36	73	−37	22
16	Armenian SSR	Dynamo Yerevan	34	8	5	21	36	70	−34	21
17	Latvian SSR	Daugava Riga	34	7	5	22	21	64	−43	19
18	Ukrainian SSR	Shakhtyor Stalino	34	5	8	21	21	73	−52	18

Source: rsssf.com

== Results ==
Home \ Away	CDK	DAU	DYK	DLE	DMN	DYN	DTB	DYE	KRY	LKH	LOK	NEF	SHA	SPA	TOR	TST	VVS	ZEN
CDKA Moscow		4–0	2–3	2–0	4–1	2–1	2–0	0–0	0–1	5–1	8–0	4–0	4–0	1–0	2–2	2–1	3–0	1–1
Daugava Riga	0–3		1–0	1–1	3–2	0–2	1–3	1–1	1–2	0–3	1–0	0–1	1–1	1–3	0–1	1–1	1–0	0–1
Dynamo Kyiv	0–2	1–0		2–1	4–0	2–6	1–0	2–0	1–1	4–3	1–1	2–1	2–0	0–0	2–2	1–0	0–4	1–0
Dynamo Leningrad	1–3	2–0	0–4		0–2	1–0	0–0	2–4	1–1	1–1	3–2	2–1	5–0	1–2	3–1	2–0	1–1	0–0
Dinamo Minsk	0–0	1–2	0–0	2–2		0–2	2–2	3–2	2–2	2–1	3–0	2–1	0–2	0–5	1–4	3–1	0–1	2–0
Dynamo Moscow	3–1	6–0	4–1	2–2	2–0		4–1	7–1	5–0	3–0	1–1	2–1	10–1	5–4	2–1	1–1	1–0	8–0
Dynamo Tbilisi	1–6	2–0	6–1	1–1	6–1	0–1		2–1	6–0	1–1	1–0	0–0	5–0	2–3	2–2	0–3	2–0	0–1
Dynamo Yerevan	0–6	2–0	2–1	0–4	0–2	3–4	1–2		1–1	1–3	3–1	1–0	1–0	1–2	0–3	1–1	2–1	0–1
Krylia Sovetov Kuybyshev	1–0	3–2	2–2	1–2	2–0	1–2	2–2	4–2		2–0	1–1	3–0	2–1	0–6	0–1	0–0	2–2	2–2
Lokomotiv Kharkov	0–1	0–0	1–2	3–1	3–0	2–1	0–1	2–0	0–0		0–5	1–1	3–0	0–0	2–3	2–0	0–0	0–1
Lokomotiv Moscow	1–1	2–0	0–3	1–3	6–0	1–4	1–1	1–2	2–0	5–0		1–1	1–1	4–6	2–1	4–1	5–0	6–1
Neftyanik Baku	1–2	0–1	0–1	1–1	3–0	1–1	0–1	2–1	0–0	1–2	2–0		0–0	1–4	1–1	4–1	1–0	0–0
Shakhtyor Stalino	1–4	1–0	1–0	0–5	2–1	0–1	2–3	1–0	1–2	1–1	0–2	0–0		0–1	0–3	2–3	1–1	1–2
Spartak Moscow	1–2	6–1	3–0	8–1	2–1	1–4	0–1	2–2	5–0	2–2	3–0	4–1	0–0		3–3	8–2	1–0	2–1
Torpedo Moscow	2–4	2–0	1–0	0–2	2–2	0–1	2–2	2–1	6–1	3–0	2–0	1–0	5–0	0–0		1–1	0–2	1–1
Torpedo Stalingrad	3–1	1–2	0–2	1–0	1–0	0–0	1–2	2–0	3–1	4–1	0–0	0–0	0–0	0–2	1–2		1–1	1–2
VVS Moscow	1–1	5–0	1–2	3–0	3–1	0–2	3–2	3–0	1–0	0–0	1–0	0–0	3–1	1–4	4–3	3–1		2–2
Zenit Leningrad	3–3	1–0	2–0	3–2	3–0	1–6	2–2	2–0	1–0	0–3	1–3	3–0	2–0	5–0	0–1	1–0	2–1	

Legend: Blue = home team win; Yellow = draw; Red = away team win.

== Top scorers ==
26 goals

- Nikita Simonyan (Spartak Moscow)

23 goals

- Ivan Konov (Dynamo Moscow)
- Aleksandr Ponomarev (Torpedo Moscow)

20 goals

- Konstantin Beskov (Dynamo Moscow)

19 goals

- Andrei Zazroyev (Dinamo Tbilisi)

18 goals

- Grigory Fedotov (CDKA Moscow)

17 goals

- Vladimir Savdunin (Dynamo Moscow)

16 goals

- Viktor Terentyev (Spartak Moscow)

15 goals

- Aleksei Grinin (CDKA Moscow)
- Vasili Lotkov (Dynamo Leningrad)
- Aleksei Paramonov (Spartak Moscow)
