= Football derbies in Russia =

This is a list of the main association football rivalries in Russia.

- Moscow derbies:
  - Oldest Russian derby: Spartak Moscow vs. Dynamo Moscow
  - Main Moscow derby: Spartak Moscow vs. CSKA Moscow
  - Any match between Torpedo Moscow, Spartak Moscow, CSKA Moscow, Lokomotiv Moscow and Dynamo Moscow
  - Derby of the Southern Administrative district of Moscow: Chertanovo vs. Torpedo Moscow
- Rivalry of Two Capitals:
  - Spartak Moscow vs. Zenit Saint Petersburg
  - Dynamo Moscow vs. Zenit Saint Petersburg
  - CSKA Moscow vs. Zenit Saint Petersburg
  - Lokomotiv Moscow vs. Zenit Saint Petersburg
- Saint Petersburg derby:
  - Traditional: Dynamo Saint Petersburg vs. Zenit Saint Petersburg
  - New: Tosno/Leningradets vs. Zenit Saint Petersburg
- Baltic derby: Zenit Saint Petersburg vs. Baltika Kaliningrad
- Nordic derby: Zenit Saint Petersburg vs. Karelia
- Volga derbies:
  - Rubin Kazan vs. Krylia Sovetov Samara
  - Volga Ulyanovsk vs. Volga Nizhny Novgorod
  - Rotor Volgograd vs. Sokol Saratov
  - Rotor Volgograd vs. Rubin Kazan
  - Krylia Sovetov Samara vs. Rotor Volgograd
- Siberian derby: Tom Tomsk vs. Sibir Novosibirsk vs. Tyumen
  - Any match between Novokuznetsk, Irtysh, Yenisey, Baikal
- Krasnodar derby: Professional Football Club Kuban Krasnodar vs. FC Krasnodar vs Kuban Krasnodar
- Kazan derby: Rubin Kazan vs. FC Nefis Kazan
- Golden Ring derby: Shinnik Yaroslavl vs. Tekstilshchik Ivanovo vs. Torpedo Vladimir, can also included Spartak Kostroma, Dynamo Kostroma
- Far Eastern derby: Luch-Energiya Vladivostok vs. SKA-Khabarovsk
- Ural derby: Ural vs. Amkar vs. Orenburg
- Rostov-on-Don derby: Rostov vs. SKA
- Kostroma derby: Spartak Kostroma vs. Dynamo Kostroma
- Caucasian derby: Akhmat vs. Anzhi, can also included Spartak Nalchik, Alania Vladikavkaz
- Nizhny Novgorod derbies:
  - Main Nizhny Novgorod derby: Volga vs. Lokomotiv-NN
  - Little Nizhny Novgorod derbies: Volga vs. Nizhny Novgorod, Nizhnyy Novgorod vs. Lokomotiv-NN
  - Any match between Volga / Elektronika, Torpedo NN, Nizhny Novgorod, Lokomotiv-NN and Olimpiyets
- Astrakhan derby: Volgar vs. Astrakhan
- Makhachkala derby: Anzhi vs. Dynamo Makhachkala vs. Legion-Dinamo vs. Makhachkala
- Volgograd derby: Rotor vs. Olimpiya vs. Volgograd
- Vladikavkaz derby: Alaniya vs. Avtodor vs. Spartak Vladikavkaz
- Tatarstan derby:
  - Any match between KAMAZ, Neftekhimik, Rubin Kazan / FC Rubin-2 Kazan and FC Alnas Almetyevsk
  - FC Neftyanik Bugulma vs. FC Progress Zelenodolsk
- Moscow Oblast derbies:
  - Any match between FC Saturn Ramenskoye, FC Khimki and FC Vityaz Podolsk
  - Podolsk derbies:
    - FC Avangard Podolsk (defunct) vs. FC Vityaz Podolsk
    - FC Podolye Podolsky district / FC Peresvet Podolsk (until 2018) vs. FC Vityaz Podolsk
  - Derby of the north-western part of Moscow region: FC Zorky Krasnogorsk vs. FC Khimki
- Chernozem and Central Russian inter-regional rivalries:
  - Any match between Avangard Kursk, Dynamo Bryansk, Oryol, Salyut, Metallurg Lipetsk, FC Fakel Voronezh, Avangard Kursk, FC Tambov (earlier FC Spartak Tambov), Metallurg-Oskol.
  - Lipetsk–Moscow regions derby: FC Metallurg Lipetsk vs. FC Vityaz Podolsk
  - Tula–Oryol derby: FC Arsenal Tula vs. FC Oryol
- Kaluga Oblast derby: FC Kaluga vs. FC Kvant Obninsk, earlier Lokomotiv Kaluga vs FC Obninsk
- Lipetsk Oblast derby: FC Metallurg Lipetsk vs. FC Yelets
- Ryazan—Lipetsk derby : FC Ryazan vs. FC Metallurg Lipetsk
- Voronezh Oblast derby: Fakel Voronezh vs. Lokomotiv Liski
- Pskov Oblast derby: FC Pskov-747 / FC Pskov-2000 (FC Pskov, FC Mashinostroitel Pskov) vs. FC Luki-Energiya Velikiye Luki
