= 1939 in Soviet football =

Football in the Soviet Union
- Season: 1939

Men's football
- Group A: Spartak Moscow
- Group B: Krylia Sovetov Moscow
- Soviet Cup: Spartak Moscow

The 1939 Soviet football championship was the 9th seasons of competitive football in the Soviet Union and the 5th among teams of sports societies and factories. FC Spartak Moscow won the championship becoming the winner of Group A for the third time.

The defending champions Spartak Moscow, while struggling in the first half of season, they made a great run in the second half and successfully defended their domestic title.

== Honours ==
| Competition | Winner | Runner-up |
|---|---|---|
| Group A | Spartak Moscow (3*) | Dinamo Tbilisi |
| Group B | Krylia Sovetov Moscow | Lokomotiv Tbilisi |
| Soviet Cup | Spartak Moscow (2*) | Stalinets Leningrad |

Notes = Number in parentheses is the times that club has won that honour. * indicates new record for competition

== Organization ==
The 1938 USSR football championship competitions are conducted by the All-Union Committee on sports and physical culture under rules adopted in 1939. Matches between teams are played in double round-robin tournament: on own and opponents' turf fields. Number of players for each team should not exceed more than 18. Players who are on the roster to play in Soviet championship cannot participate for teams of their society in local city competitions. The team that receives the most points in the Soviet championship is awarded with the title of champion and the All-Union Committee banner. Players as well as politruks and coaches are given tokens and certificates of the All-Union Committee.

Teams are obligated to participate until end of the season's calendar. Team that were withdrawn from competition on decision of the All-Union Committee or other reasons are barred to compete in 1940. Results (points) that were received by all teams in matches with the withdrawn team are zeroed. Players of the withdrawn team don't have a right to play for other sports organizations that compete in the Soviet championship this season without permission of the Central Sports Inspecition.

On equal points among teams, the order of their placement is determined by a coefficient of scored and allowed goals (goal ratio).

Undisciplined players who were ejected out of the field by a referee for a foul are barred from other matches until the decisions of the Disciplinary and Conflict Commission and the Central Sports Inspection.

The last three teams of the 1939 championship are relegated from the first group to the second for the 1940 season. The top two teams of the Second Group of the 1939 championship are promoted to the First Group for the 1940 season.

== Soviet Cup ==
Spartak Moscow beat Stalinets Leningrad 3–1 in the Soviet Cup final. As in the last season, the decisive goal was scored by Viktor Semyonov.

== Soviet Union football championship ==
=== Group A ===
| Pos | Team | Pld | W | D | L | GF | GA | GR | Pts |
|---|---|---|---|---|---|---|---|---|---|
| 1 | Spartak Moscow (C) | 26 | 14 | 9 | 3 | 58 | 23 | 2.522 | 37 |
| 2 | Dynamo Tbilisi | 26 | 14 | 5 | 7 | 60 | 41 | 1.463 | 33 |
| 3 | CDKA Moscow | 26 | 14 | 4 | 8 | 68 | 43 | 1.581 | 32 |
| 4 | Traktor Stalingrad | 26 | 13 | 4 | 9 | 50 | 39 | 1.282 | 30 |
| 5 | Lokomotiv Moscow | 26 | 12 | 6 | 8 | 42 | 39 | 1.077 | 30 |
| 6 | Metallurg Moscow | 26 | 12 | 5 | 9 | 53 | 50 | 1.060 | 29 |
| 7 | Dynamo Moscow | 26 | 12 | 4 | 10 | 60 | 46 | 1.304 | 28 |
| 8 | Dynamo Kiev | 26 | 9 | 8 | 9 | 39 | 44 | 0.886 | 26 |
| 9 | Torpedo Moscow | 26 | 8 | 7 | 11 | 51 | 51 | 1.000 | 23 |
| 10 | Dynamo Leningrad | 26 | 8 | 6 | 12 | 41 | 56 | 0.732 | 22 |
| 11 | Stalinets Leningrad | 26 | 7 | 7 | 12 | 30 | 46 | 0.652 | 21 |
| 12 | Stakhanovets Stalino | 26 | 5 | 10 | 11 | 40 | 55 | 0.727 | 20 |
| 13 | Elektrik Leningrad (R) | 26 | 6 | 5 | 15 | 32 | 49 | 0.653 | 17 |
| 14 | Dynamo Odessa (R) | 26 | 7 | 2 | 17 | 25 | 67 | 0.373 | 16 |

Source: rsssf.com
(C) Champions; (R) Relegated

=== Group B ===
| Pos | Republic | Team | Pld | W | D | L | GF | GA | GR | Pts |
|---|---|---|---|---|---|---|---|---|---|---|
| 1 | Russian SFSR | Krylya Sovetov Moscow (P) | 22 | 17 | 2 | 3 | 52 | 19 | 2.737 | 36 |
| 2 | Georgian SSR | Lokomotiv Tbilisi (P) | 22 | 13 | 7 | 2 | 44 | 23 | 1.913 | 33 |
| 3 | Russian SFSR | Dinamo Rostov-na-Donu (R) | 22 | 11 | 7 | 4 | 43 | 28 | 1.536 | 29 |
| 4 | Russian SFSR | Pischevik Moscow | 22 | 12 | 4 | 6 | 53 | 29 | 1.828 | 28 |
| 5 | Azerbaijan SSR | Temp Baku | 22 | 12 | 4 | 6 | 29 | 19 | 1.526 | 28 |
| 6 | Russian SFSR | Spartak Leningrad | 22 | 11 | 5 | 6 | 46 | 27 | 1.704 | 27 |
| 7 | Ukrainian SSR | Dinamo Kharkov | 22 | 10 | 7 | 5 | 43 | 31 | 1.387 | 27 |
| 8 | Russian SFSR | Burevestnik Moscow | 22 | 10 | 6 | 6 | 38 | 28 | 1.357 | 26 |
| 9 | Ukrainian SSR | FC Sudostroitel Nikolayev | 22 | 9 | 7 | 6 | 40 | 38 | 1.053 | 25 |
| 10 | Ukrainian SSR | Selmash Kharkov | 22 | 10 | 4 | 8 | 38 | 25 | 1.520 | 24 |
| 11 | Ukrainian SSR | Lokomotiv Kiev | 22 | 11 | 2 | 9 | 40 | 33 | 1.212 | 24 |
| 12 | Russian SFSR | Torpedo Gorkiy | 22 | 9 | 6 | 7 | 37 | 38 | 0.974 | 24 |
| 13 | Georgian SSR | Dinamo Batumi (R) | 22 | 8 | 7 | 7 | 37 | 32 | 1.156 | 23 |
| 14 | Armenian SSR | Spartak Yerevan | 22 | 9 | 3 | 10 | 26 | 33 | 0.788 | 21 |
| 15 | Ukrainian SSR | Stal Dnepropetrovsk (R) | 22 | 6 | 7 | 9 | 27 | 37 | 0.730 | 19 |
| 16 | Ukrainian SSR | Dzerzhinets Voroshilovgrad (R) | 22 | 8 | 3 | 11 | 37 | 51 | 0.725 | 19 |
| 17 | Russian SFSR | Stalinets Moscow (R) | 22 | 6 | 6 | 10 | 32 | 42 | 0.762 | 18 |
| 18 | Ukrainian SSR | Spartak Kharkov (R) | 22 | 8 | 1 | 13 | 35 | 45 | 0.778 | 17 |
| 19 | Russian SFSR | Osnova Ivanovo (R) | 22 | 6 | 2 | 14 | 34 | 45 | 0.756 | 14 |
| 20 | Russian SFSR | Avangard Leningrad | 22 | 5 | 4 | 13 | 26 | 44 | 0.591 | 14 |
| 21 | Byelorussian SSR | Spartak Minsk (R) | 22 | 4 | 3 | 15 | 28 | 70 | 0.400 | 11 |
| 22 | Russian SFSR | Zenit Leningrad (Note: FC Zenit Leningrad was merged with FC Stalinets Leningrad into FC Zenit Leningrad playing in the Gruppa A (Soviet Top League).) | 22 | 3 | 4 | 15 | 28 | 46 | 0.609 | 10 |
| 23 | Russian SFSR | Dinamo Kazan (R) | 22 | 4 | 1 | 17 | 20 | 50 | 0.400 | 9 |

(P) Promoted; (R) Relegated

=== Top goalscorers ===
Group A

- Grigoriy Fedotov (CDKA Moscow) – 21 goals

Group B

- Nikolai Korzunov (Dinamo Rostov-na-Donu) – 19 goals

== Republican level ==
Football competitions of union republics

=== Football championships ===
- Azerbaijan SSR – Lokomotiv Baku
- Armenian SSR – Spartak Yerevan
- Belarusian SSR – Dinamo Minsk (see Football Championship of the Belarusian SSR)
- Georgian SSR – Nauka Tbilisi
- Kazakh SSR – none
- Kirgiz SSR – Dinamo Frunze
- Russian SFSR – none
- Tajik SSR – none
- Turkmen SSR – none
- Uzbek SSR – Dinamo Tashkent
- Ukrainian SSR – Lokomotyv zavodiv Zaporizhia (see 1939 Football Championship of the Ukrainian SSR)

=== Football cups ===
- Azerbaijan SSR – Lokomotiv Baku
- Armenian SSR – Dinamo Leninakan
- Belarusian SSR – IFK Minsk
- Georgian SSR – Nauka Tbilisi
- Kazakh SSR – Dinamo Alma-Ata
- Kirgiz SSR – Dinamo Frunze
- Russian SFSR – Dinamo Voronezh
- Tajik SSR – Dinamo Stalinabad
- Turkmen SSR – Dinamo Ashkhabad
- Uzbek SSR – Dinamo Tashkent
- Ukrainian SSR – Avanhard Kramatorsk (see 1939 Cup of the Ukrainian SSR)
