= Mikhail Biryukov (footballer, born 1958) =

Soviet and Russian footballer and coach (born 1958)

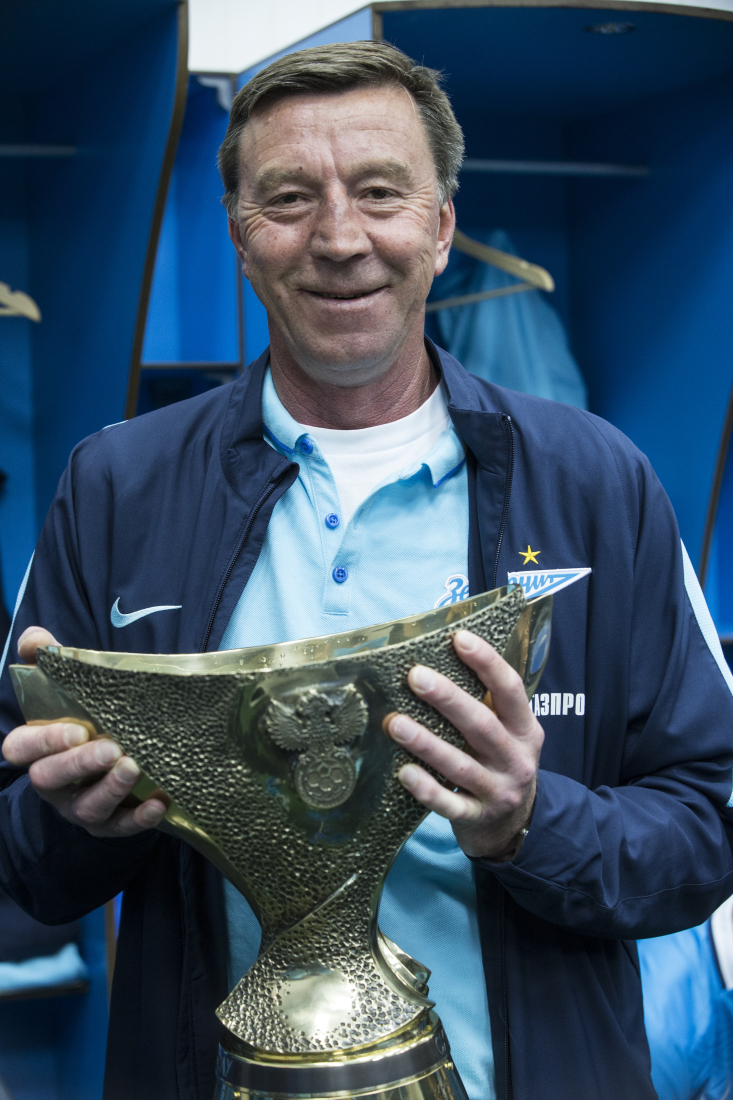
- Biryukov in 2015

Personal information
- Full name: Mikhail Yuryevich Biryukov
- Date of birth: 7 May 1958 (age 68)
- Place of birth: Orekhovo-Zuyevo, Russian SFSR
- Height: 1.90 m (6 ft 3 in)
- Position: Goalkeeper

Team information
- Current team: Zenit Saint Petersburg (GK coach, advisor)

Senior career*
Years	Team	Apps	(Gls)
1975	FC Amur Blagoveshchensk	0	(0)
1976–1979	FC Znamya Truda Orekhovo-Zuyevo	2	(0)
1980–1991	Zenit Leningrad	333	(0)
1992–1993	MyPa	61	(0)
1993	Tevalte	10	(0)
- FC Nikol Tallinn
1995–1999	Lokomotiv Saint Petersburg	171	(1)

International career
1984–1985	USSR	2	(0)

Managerial career
- 2000: FC Rotor Volgograd (assistant)
- 2000–2002: FC Zenit St. Petersburg (assistant)
- 2002: FC Zenit St. Petersburg (caretaker)
- 2003: FC Petrotrest St. Petersburg (caretaker)
- 2006–: FC Zenit St. Petersburg (goalkeeping coach)
- 2024–: Zenit Saint Petersburg (advisor)
- * Club domestic league appearances and goals

Mikhail Yuryevich Biryukov (Russian: Михаил Юрьевич Бирюков; born 7 May 1958) is a retired Soviet and Russian football player. He works as an advisor with FC Zenit St. Petersburg.

== Honours ==
- Soviet Premier League winner: 1984
- Best Soviet Goalkeeper title: 1984

== International career ==
Biryukov made his debut for USSR on 19 August 1984 in a friendly against Mexico.
