= Konstantin Yegorov =

Soviet Russian footballer and coach (1900–1973)

Personal information
- Full name: Konstantin Andreyevich Yegorov
- Date of birth: 1 June 1900
- Place of birth: St. Petersburg, Russia
- Date of death: 22 July 1973 (aged 73)
- Place of death: Leningrad, Russian SFSR
- Height: 1.70 m (5 ft 7 in)
- Position: Midfielder

Senior career*
Years	Team	Apps	(Gls)
1915–1921	FC Kolomyagi Petrograd		
1922–1923	FC Sport Petrograd		
1924	FC Spartak of Petrograd Rayon A Petrograd		
1931	FC Dynamo Leningrad		

Managerial career
- 1938–1940: FC Zenit Leningrad
- * Club domestic league appearances and goals

Konstantin Andreyevich Yegorov (Russian: Константин Андреевич Егоров; born 1 June 1900 in St. Petersburg; died 22 July 1973 in Leningrad) was a Soviet Russian football player and coach.
