= Solnica (surname) =

Solnica [sɔlˈnit͡sa]- personal name recorded in Polish–Lithuanian Commonwealth in 1616 in Lesser Poland and Greater Poland regions. It belongs to the group of surnames motivated by lexicons related to salt mining or sun - Sol (Latin), Sól (Germanic mythology). In January 2020, about 600 persons bearing the surname lived in Poland, mostly in Kielce, Warsaw, Siedlce, Krakow and Lodz.

In Old and Middle Polish, the anthroponym ‘Solnica’ referred to a place where salt was mined. In records of surnames, the personal name ‘Solnica’ appears as early as the 16th century in Crown of the Kingdom of Poland and was recorded in the regions of Lesser Poland and Greater Poland in 1512.

Associated names:

Solnica (ger. Laakendorf)- Village in Pomeranian Voivodeship, founded in 1600 by the Olęder settlers.

Solnica - former street in Kielce, known for the fact that Stefan Zeromski lived next to it, now Silniczna street

Solnice - (ger. Solnitz) - Town in Hradec Králové, Czech Republic - former monastery and later medieval fortress.

Solnitsata - (bul. Солницата) - was an ancient town located in present-day Bulgaria and the site of a salt production facility.

Solna (Swedish: Solna kommunor Solna stad, IPA: [ˈsôːlna]), is a municipality in central Stockholm County, Sweden, located just north of Stockholm City Centre.

Solntsev - (Russian: Солнцев, from солнцеmeaning sun) is a Russian masculine surname, its feminine counterpart is Solntseva.

Solntsevo District - (Russian: райо́н Со́лнцево) is a district of Western Administrative Okrug of the federal city of Moscow, Russia.

Solntsevskaya Bratva - The Solntsevskaya Organized Crime Group also known as the Solntsevskaya Bratva(Russian: Солнцевская братва), is a Russian crime syndicate group.

Solnicki Forest - a green area located in the southern part of Białystok, in the vicinity of Krywlany Airport. The area of the forest is approximately 700 ha.

Sollnitz - town in Dessau-Roßlau, in the state of Saxony-Anhalt, Germany.

Söllnitz - is a district of the city of Blankenhain in the Weimarer Land district, Thuringia.

Salnyzja - (rus. Сальница, Salniza) - Village in Ukrainian region of Vinnytsia. Originally was granted Magdeburg city rights in 1607. After the Treaty of Sboriw concluded in 1652 it came back to Poland-Lithuania and was rebuilt. In 1722 the city was confirmed the privileges granted in 1607 by the Polish king (from the house of Vasa) Sigismund III Vasa.

== Surname - notable people with the surname Solnica ==
- Amy Solnica - Hadassah University Medical Centre and Hebrew University of Jerusalem researcher
- Alexander Aleksandrovich Solntsev (1880 - 25 November 1914) was a hero of the Great War, captain of the Erivan regiment. Grenadier, Years of service 1898-1914, Rank Captain - Commanded a company at the 13th Lifeboat Grenadier Tsar Mikhail Fyodorovich Regiment
- Andrzej Solnica – colonel of the Polish Army. He is best known as the commander of the 34th Armored Cavalry Brigade of Great Hetman of the Crown Jan Zamoyski
- Anton Wilhelm Solnitz - German-Bohemian composer.
- Antoni Solnica - fine wine merchant, father of Franciszek Solnicki - mayor of Kielce (1801-1809 under the Austrian rule)
- Bogdan Solnica - professor of medicine at the Jagiellonian University
- Dariusz Solnica - Polish footballer, he is best known as Legia Warsaw and Poland National teams u-15, u-16, u-23 striker
- Fedor Solntsev - (Russian: Фёдор Григо́рьевич Со́лнцев) (26 April 1801 – 15 March 1892) was a Russian painter and historian of art. His artwork was a major contribution in recording and preserving medieval Russian culture, which was a common subject of his paintings.
- Gavriil Ilyich Solntsev (Russian: Солнцев, Гавриил Ильич) (1786-1866) - ordinal professor, dean of the department of moral and political sciences and rector of the Imperial Kazan University; later - Kazan provincial prosecutor.
- Herschel Solnica - American Rabbi of New York City
- Hélène Solnica - French professor of literature
- Igor Solnica - Slovak marksman from Trnava, representative of ŠKP Trnava club, European champion from 2011 in combined shooting FITASC (Fédération Internationale de Tir aux Armes Sportives de Chasse) in Sarlóspuszta, Hungary
- Józef Solnica - decorated with a Virtuti Militari order, Cichociemny - Silent Unseen, commander of the partisan unit and lieutenant of the Home Army
- Lilianna Solnica-Krezel - Alan A and Edith L Wolff Distinguished Professor at Washington University School of Medicine
- Marek Solnica - architect from city of Lodz, member of the Association of Polish Architects of the Lodz branch
- Simon Solnica - American psychologist from New York City
- Titi Solnica - Slovak wrestler from Nitra
- Witold Solnica - Assistant professor at the Warsaw University of Technology
- Yelizaveta Kovalskaya Born Solntseva - daughter of Colonel Solntsev (Russian: Елизавета Николаевна Ковальская; 17/29 June 1851 – 1943) was a Russian revolutionary, narodnik, and founding member of Black Repartition.
