= Yury Morozov (footballer, born 1934) =

Russian footballer and manager (1934–2005)

Personal information
- Full name: Yury Andreyevich Morozov
- Date of birth: 13 May 1934
- Place of birth: Leningrad, Russian SFSR, Soviet Union
- Date of death: 15 February 2005 (aged 70)
- Place of death: St. Petersburg, Russia
- Position: Midfielder

Senior career*
Years	Team	Apps	(Gls)
1954	Zenit Leningrad		
1955–1956	FShM Leningrad		
1957–1958	Zenit Leningrad		
1958–1961	Admiralteyets		
1962–1964	Dinamo Leningrad		

Managerial career
- 1974–1976: USSR (assistant coach)
- 1976–1977: Spartak Moscow (assistant coach)
- 1977–1982: Zenit Leningrad
- 1983: USSR (assistant coach)
- 1983–1984: Dynamo Kyiv
- 1984–1987: CSKA Moscow
- 1986–1990: USSR (assistant coach)
- 1988: USSR
- 1990: Iraq
- 1991: Zenit Leningrad
- 1992–1993: Sharjah FC
- 1994–1995: Kuwait (assistant coach)
- 1995–1997: Zenit St. Petersburg (sports director)
- 2000–2002: Zenit St. Petersburg
- 2002–2003: FC Petrotrest St. Peterburg
- * Club domestic league appearances and goals

Yury Andreyevich Morozov (Russian: Ю́рий Андре́евич Моро́зов; 13 May 1934 – 15 February 2005) was a Soviet football player and coach.

He made his name as a midfielder in the 1950s and 1960s with his hometown clubs FC Zenit, Admiralteyets and FC Dinamo Leningrad, earning himself a call-up to the USSR 'B' team.

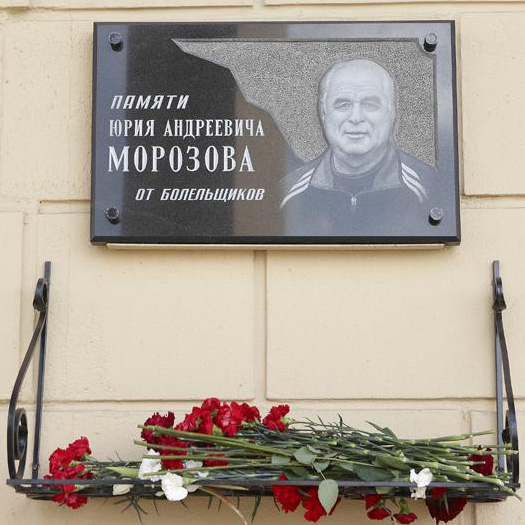
Plaque in Morozov memory's in Saint Petersburg

He retired from playing at the age of 31 and worked at FC Zenit's youth academy and became a dean of football science at the Lesgaft Academy of Physical Education. He then joined Valery Lobanovsky's USSR coaching staff, assisting the famous coach at the 1976 Olympics, where they won bronze, and in their run to the 1988 UEFA European Championship final. He also worked with Lobanovsky at clubs in the Middle East at the helm of the Kuwaiti national side.

In 1977, having previously been part of the coachings staff at Spartak Moscow, he took on his first head coach's job with former club Zenit leading them to third place in the Soviet Supreme League in 1980, their highest-ever finish at the time. He had three spells as head coach at FC Zenit over a 15-year period and in 1984 the team he built became Soviet champions for the only time. He left the club for the final time in 2002 due to ill health but returned to coaching at FC Petrotrest St. Peterburg.
