= Saint Petersburg derby =

Saint Petersburg Derby
- Other names: Leningrad Derby
- Location: Saint Petersburg
- Teams: Zenit; Dynamo
- First meeting: October 1938
- Latest meeting: Dynamo 3 - 2 Zenit (21 September 2017)

Statistics
- Total meetings: 33
- Most wins: Zenit (17)
- Largest victory: Zenit 7–1 Dynamo

The Saint Petersburg derby (Russian: Петербургское дерби) was the association football local derby between two Saint Petersburg based teams – Dynamo Saint Petersburg and Zenit.

== History ==
The first derby between Zenit and Dynamo (at that time Zenit were called Stalinets) took place in October 1938 in during USSR Championship. Stalinets (now - Zenit) won with a score 4:3. At all, the Zenit won the derby 17 times, the Dynamo - 11 times. Five matches ended in a draw. In every game, you can see colourful performances of fans of both teams, but especially of Zenit's, because of a small number of Dynamo fans, since the fall of the Soviet Union.

During 2017/2018 season, there was a rivalry between Zenit and FC Tosno, from Leningrad oblast, which called sometimes as North-west Derby. The teams have played against each other twice only, with Zenit winning both games (5:0 in 2010, and 2:0 in 2017). Since 2018/2019 season there is another rivalry with FC Leningradets, but the clubs did not compete yet.

== List of matches ==
=== Soviet Top League (1936–1992) ===
		Zenit vs Dynamo			Dynamo vs Zenit		
Season	Division	Venue	Atten.	Score	Venue	Atten.	Score
1938	Soviet Top League				Dynamo Stadium		3–4
1939	Soviet Top League	Lenin Stadium		2–0	Dynamo Stadium		1–2
1940	Soviet Top League	Lenin Stadium		2–1	Dynamo Stadium		2–1
1941	Soviet Top League	Lenin Stadium		0–2			
1945	Soviet Top League	Lenin Stadium		2–0	Dynamo Stadium		3–2
1946	Soviet Top League	Lenin Stadium		1–3	Dynamo Stadium		2–3
1947	Soviet Top League	Lenin Stadium		2–1	Dynamo Stadium		0–1
1948	Soviet Top League	Lenin Stadium		0–1	Dynamo Stadium		4–2
1949	Soviet Top League	Lenin Stadium		3–2	Dynamo Stadium		0–0
1950	Soviet Top League	Lenin Stadium	100,000	1–1	Dynamo Stadium		4–0
1951	Soviet Top League	Lenin Stadium		4–2	Dynamo Stadium		1–1
1952	Soviet Top League	Lenin Stadium		2–1			–
1953	Soviet Top League	Lenin Stadium		1–2	Dynamo Stadium		0–1
1963	Soviet Top League	Lenin Stadium		1–1	Dynamo Stadium		1–1
Since 1963	There were no games due to the relegation of Dynamo to the lower division.						

=== Soviet Cup (1947–1990) ===
Season	Venue	Atten.	Score
1947	Petrovsky Stadium		1-0
1965	Petrovsky Stadium		2–1
1972	Petrovsky Stadium		2–4

=== Russian Cup (1992–present) ===
Season	Venue	Atten.	Score
1993	Petrovsky Stadium		7-1
2010	Petrovsky Stadium		3–1
2017	Krestovsky Stadium	37,200	2–3

== Honours ==
Competition	Zenit	Dynamo
Soviet Top League	1 time: 1984	0
Russian Premier League	8 times: 2007, 2010, 2011/12, 2014/15, 2018/19, 2019/20, 2020/21, 2021/22	0
Soviet Cup	1 time: 1944	0
Russian Cup	4 times: 1999, 2010, 2016, 2020	0
Russian Super Cup	7 times: 2008, 2011, 2015, 2016, 2020, 2021, 2022	0
USSR Super Cup	1 time: 1985	0
Russian Second League	0	3 times: 2001, 2009, 2017
City Cup	0	13 times: 1943–1944, 1948, 1950, 1969–1971, 1973, 1977–1979, 1983, 2019
City Championship	1 time: 1994	29 times: 1926–1927, 1930–1931, 1933, 1935, 1938, 1945, 1948, 1950–1951, 1953, 1963–1964, 1966–1968, 1970–1978, 1980–1981, 1993
Total	23	45

== See also ==
- List of association football club rivalries in Europe
