= 1939 Soviet Cup =

1939 Cup of USSR in Football
Кубок СССР

Tournament details
- Country: Soviet Union
- Dates: July 29 – September 12 (final stage)
- Teams: Preliminary stage: republican competitions; Final stage: 37 (teams of masters); 12 (from preliminaries); Total: 1,728

Final positions
- Champions: Spartak Moscow (2nd title)
- Runners-up: Stalinets Leningrad
- Semifinalists: Dinamo Tbilisi; Dinamo Tashkent

The 1939 Soviet Cup was an association football cup competition of the Soviet Union.

== Participating teams ==
Enter in Second Round		Enter in First Round	
3 teams of masters and 12 republican champions		34 teams of masters	
teams of masters ✓ Dinamo Leningrad; ✓ Dinamo Batumi; ✓ Dinamo Kazan	republican champions ✓ Infizkult Minsk; ✓ Avangard Kranatorsk; ✓ Nauka Tbilisi; ✓ Dinamo Leninakan; ✓ Lokomotiv Baku; ✓ Dinamo Alma-Ata; ✓ Dinamo Tashkent; ✓ Dinamo Frunze; ✓ Dinamo Stalinabad; ✓ Dinamo Ashkhabad ✓ Dinamo Voronezh; ✓ Spartak-2 Moscow	Group A ✓ Spartak Moscow; ✓ Dynamo Tbilisi; ✓ CDKA Moscow; ✓ Traktor Stalingrad; ✓ Lokomotiv Moscow; ✓ Metallurg Moscow; ✓ Dynamo Moscow; ✓ Dynamo Kiev; ✓ Torpedo Moscow; ✓ Stalinets Leningrad ✓ Stakhanovets Stalino; ✓ Elektrik Leningrad; ✓ Dynamo Odessa	Group B ✓ Krylya Sovetov Moscow; ✓ Lokomotiv Tbilisi; ✓ Dinamo Rostov-na-Donu; ✓ Pischevik Moscow; ✓ Temp Baku; ✓ Spartak Leningrad; ✓ Dinamo Kharkov; ✓ Burevestnik Moscow; ✓ Sudostroitel Nikolayev; ✓ Selmash Kharkov ✓ Lokomotiv Kiev; ✓ Torpedo Gorkiy; ✓ Dinamo [Spartak] Yerevan; ✓ Stal Dnepropetrovsk; ✓ Dzerzhinets Voroshilovgrad; ✓ Stalinets Moscow; ✓ Spartak Kharkov; ✓ Osnova Ivanovo; ✓ Avangard Leningrad; ✓ Spartak Minsk ✓ Zenit Leningrad

Source: []

== Competition schedule ==
=== First round ===
[Jul 29] 
Krylya Sovetov Moskva        0-7  DINAMO Kharkov 
[Jul 30] 
AVANGARD Leningrad           w/o  Torpedo Gorkiy 
Burevestnik Moskva           1-2  DINAMO Yerevan 
Dinamo Moskva                1-4  LOKOMOTIV Moskva   
  [Sergei Ilyin 9 – Mikhail Zhukov 13 pen, Vasiliy Kartsev 40, 62, Pyotr Terenkov 60] 
DINAMO Rostov-na-Donu        4-2  SelMash Kharkov 
DZERZHINETS Voroshilovgrad   3-1  Osnova Ivanovo 
STAKHANOVETS Stalino         6-2  Lokomotiv Tbilisi 
  [Nikolai Kononenko-3, Grigoriy Balaba, Vasiliy Sidorov, Grigoriy Nesmekha - ?] 
Stalinets Moskva             3-3  Spartak Kharkov       [aet] 
  [Yevgeniy Mikhailov 5, Alexei Shumov 12, Vsevolod Davidovich 20 – Boris Gurkin 30 pen, 72 pen, Alexei Serov 82] 
[Jul 31] 
DINAMO Kiev                  1-0  Spartak Minsk         [aet] 
  [Pyotr Laiko 120] 
Lokomotiv Kiev               0-1  TEMP Baku 
  [Georgiy Belyayev 75] 
PISHCHEVIK Moskva            2-1  Dinamo Odessa 
  [Sergei Lipachov, Igor Rytov – Alexandr Afonkin] 
STALINETS Leningrad          3-2  Traktor Stalingrad    [aet] 
  [Nikolai Solovyov 3, Mikhail Baryshev 118, Alexandr Zyablikov 134 – Vasiliy Liventsev 35, 113] 
[Aug 1] 
Metallurg Moskva             2-3  STAL Dnepropetrovsk 
  [Konstantin Beskov, Alexei Zaitsev – Pyotr Stupakov 80, 84, Vasiliy Gotselyuk 86] 
Sudostroitel Nikolayev       1-2  ELEKTRIK Leningrad 
[Aug 2] 
SPARTAK Moskva               1-0  Spartak Leningrad 
  [Viktor Semyonov 54] 
[Aug 3] 
CDKA Moskva                  4-0  Zenit Leningrad 
  [Sergei Kapelkin 2, Alexei Abramov 8, Grigoriy Fedotov 12, 20] 
[Aug 3] 
DINAMO Tbilisi               5-2  Torpedo Moskva 
  [Viktor Berezhnoi 32, 69, Mikhail Berdzenishvili 34 pen, Gayoz Jejelava 48, Boris Paichadze 55 – Ramiz Karichev 10, Konstantin Ryazantsev 77 pen]

==== First round replays ====
[Jul 31] 
STALINETS Moskva             6-0  Spartak Kharkov 
  [Alexei Shumov-3, Yevgeniy Moskvin-2, Nikolai Chuklyayev]

=== Second round ===
[Aug 1] 
Dinamo Leningrad             w/o  DINAMO Batumi 
[Aug 6] 
Dinamo Kazan                 0-2  SPARTAK Moskva 
  [Pavel Kornilov 41, 90] 
Lokomotiv Baku               0-7  TEMP Baku  
  [Mir-Mehti Agayev 1, 38, 44, 63, Georgiy Belyayev 14 pen, Makarov 47, Artash Amirjanov 51] 
LOKOMOTIV Moskva             1-0  Stalinets Moskva 
  [Vladimir Ogurtsov 88] 
Nauka Tbilisi                0-3  STAKHANOVETS Stalino 
Stal Dnepropetrovsk          0-1  STALINETS Leningrad 
  [Valentin Shelagin 3] 
[Aug 8] 
Dinamo Leninakan             0-2  AVANGARD Kramatorsk 
DINAMO Tashkent              3-0  Avangard Leningrad 
  [Anisimov 3, 67, 72] 
[Aug 8] 
Dinamo Tbilisi               2-2  Pishchevik Moskva 
  [Boris Paichadze 15, ? 55 – Alexei Kasimov 41, 65] 
[Aug 9] 
Dinamo Frunze                2-4  DINAMO Kharkov 
DINAMO Yereven               w/o  Dzerzhinets Voroshilovgrad 
[Aug 10] 
CDKA Moskva                  6-1  Dinamo Rostov-na-Donu 
  [Sergei Kapelkin 26, Alexei Grinin 47, Grigoriy Fedotov 55, 74, 86, Mikhail Orekhov 88 – Anton Kolomatskiy 12] 
DINAMO Alma-Ata              2-1  Dinamo Kiev 
  [G.Bedritskiy 16 pen, Sid 65 – Pyotr Laiko 40] 
DINAMO Stalinabad            w/o  Elektrik Leningrad 
[Aug 13] 
InFizKult Minsk              w/o  DINAMO Voronezh 
[Aug 15] 
DINAMO Ashkhabad             2-0  Spartak-2 Moskva 
  [Milashev 47, Nikitin 86]

==== Second round replays ====
[Aug 9] 
DINAMO Tbilisi               1-0  Pishchevik Moskva 
  [Gayoz Jejelava 55]

=== Third round ===
[Aug 13] 
CDKA Moskva                  1-0  Dinamo Yerevan 
  [Mikhail Orekhov 77] 
[Aug 14] 
DINAMO Tbilisi               5-3  Dinamo Batumi 
  [Boris Paichadze-2, ??...] 
Lokomotiv Moskva             0-1  SPARTAK Moskva 
  [Vladimir Stepanov 41] 
[Aug 19] 
Dinamo Ashkhabad             1-2  DINAMO Stalinabad 
  [Sokov 17 - ?] 
[Aug 20] 
STALINETS Leningrad          2-0  Avangard Kramatorsk 
  [Viktor Smagin 38, Nikolai Solovyov 68] 
[Aug 21] 
Dinamo Kharkov               1-1  Temp Baku 
  [G.Kharlamov 8 – Stepanov 86] 
Dinamo Voronezh              0-3  DINAMO Tashkent 
[Aug 24] 
STAKHANOVETS Stalino         3-0  Dinamo Alma-Ata 
  [Mikhail Vasin 25, ?, Alexandr Yakovlev ?]

==== Third round replays ====
[Aug 22] 
Dinamo Kharkov               1-2  TEMP Baku 
  [P.Makarov 85 – Georgiy Belyayev 37, Aram Stepanov 51]

=== Quarterfinals ===
[Aug 22] 
CDKA Moskva                0-1  DINAMO Tbilisi 
  [Aslan Kharbedia 23] 
[Aug 28] 
STALINETS Leningrad        4-0  Dinamo Stalinabad 
  [Mikhail Baryshev 50, Nikolai Solovyov 67, Alexandr Zyablikov 76, V.Smirnov 84] 
Temp Baku                  1-2  DINAMO Tashkent  
  [Mir-Mehti Agayev 51 – Anisimov 46, 52]   
[Aug 30] 
SPARTAK Moskva             3-1  Stakhanovets Stalino 
  [Alexei Sokolov 58, 63, Andrei Protasov 81 – Mikhail Vasin 25]

=== Semifinals ===
[Sep 8] 
STALINETS Leningrad        3-0  Dinamo Tashkent 
  [Alexei Larionov 32, Nikolai Solovyov 51, Valentin Shelagin 83 pen] 
SPARTAK Moskva             1-0  Dinamo Tbilisi 
  [Andrei Protasov 65] 
Note: Dinamo Tbilisi protested against the result of the match due to bad refereeship. 
      Finally, the result was cancelled, and the match replayed on Sep 30 (when the final 
      had been already played!).

==== Semifinals replays ====
[Sep 30] 
SPARTAK Moskva             3-2  Dinamo Tbilisi 
  [Georgiy Glazkov 16, 25, 48 pen – Boris Paichadze 34, Viktor Berezhnoi 86]

=== Final ===
12 September 1939

Spartak Moscow	3 – 1	Stalinets Leningrad
Baryshev 5' (o.g.); Semyonov 29'; Sokolov 50'	[ Report]	Lasin 15'

Moscow

== Top goalscorers ==
Statistical data is incomplete and based on rounds starting from the fourth round (Round of 16).

Scorer	Team	Goals
Boris Paichadze	Dinamo Tbilisi	3
Alexei Sokolov	Spartak Moscow	3
Nikolai Solovyov	Stalinets Leningrad	3
Mikhail Vasin	Stakhanovets Stalino	3
Georgiy Glazkov	Spartak Moscow	3 (1)
