= Vladimir Lemeshev =

Soviet Russian footballer and coach

Personal information
- Full name: Vladimir Ivanovich Lemeshev
- Date of birth: 3 May 1911
- Place of birth: St. Petersburg, Russia
- Date of death: 27 February 1976 (aged 64)
- Place of death: Leningrad, Russian SFSR
- Height: 1.78 m (5 ft 10 in)
- Positions: Defender; midfielder

Senior career*
Years	Team	Apps	(Gls)
1936–1939	FC Elektrik Leningrad	49	(7)
1941	FC Dynamo Leningrad	11	(0)
1942	FC Dynamo Kazan		
1945–1949	FC Dynamo Leningrad	105	(4)

Managerial career
- 1951–1954: FC Zenit Leningrad
- * Club domestic league appearances and goals

Vladimir Ivanovich Lemeshev (Russian: Владимир Иванович Лемешев; born 3 May 1911 in St. Petersburg; died 27 February 1976 in Leningrad) was a Soviet Russian football player and coach.

He was a younger brother of Konstantin Lemeshev.
