= Vyacheslav Melnikov (footballer, born 1954) =

Russian footballer and coach

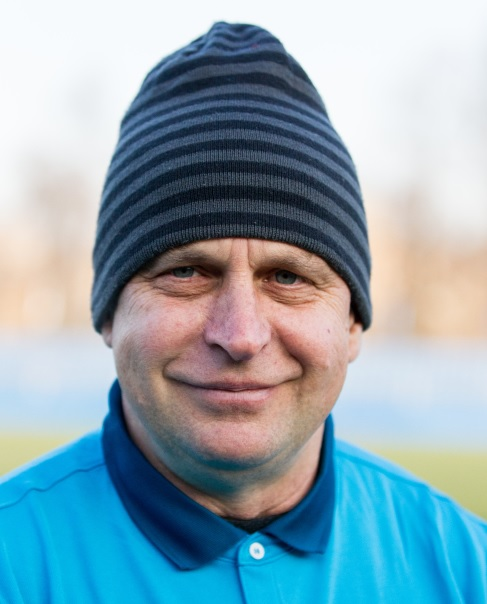
- Melnikov in 2014

Personal information
- Full name: Vyacheslav Mikhailovich Melnikov
- Date of birth: 7 March 1954 (age 72)
- Place of birth: Pavlovo, Pavlovsky District, Nizhny Novgorod Oblast
- Height: 1.79 m (5 ft 10 in)
- Position: Midfielder

Youth career
- 1964–1974: Torpedo Pavlovo

Senior career*
Years	Team	Apps	(Gls)
1975	Volga Gorky	30	(1)
1976–1986	Zenit Leningrad	259	(30)

Managerial career
- 1991: Zenit St. Petersburg (assistant)
- 1992–1994: Zenit St. Petersburg
- 1996: Torpedo Pavlovo
- 1997: Zenit St. Petersburg (assistant)
- 1998: Gazovik-Gazprom Izhevsk
- 1999–2001: Zenit St. Petersburg (director)
- 2002–2003: Zenit St. Petersburg (reserves)
- 2004–2005: Zenit-2 St. Petersburg
- 2006–2007: Metallurg-Kuzbass Novokuznetsk
- 2008: Dynamo St. Petersburg
- * Club domestic league appearances and goals

Vyacheslav Mikhailovich Melnikov (Russian: Вячеслав Михайлович Мельников; born 7 March 1954) is a Russian professional football coach and a former player.

== Honours ==
- Soviet Top League champion: 1984.
- Soviet Top League bronze: 1980.
- Soviet Cup finalist: 1984.
- USSR Federation Cup finalist: 1986.

== Manager career ==
Under his management, FC Zenit Saint Petersburg was relegated from the Russian top-tier Russian Top Division in 1992.
