= Gennadi Bondarenko =

Soviet Football Player

Personal information
- Full name: Gennadi Borisovich Bondarenko
- Date of birth: 4 February 1929
- Place of birth: Gagra, Abkhazia SSR
- Date of death: 10 April 1989 (aged 60)
- Place of death: Leningrad, Russian SFSR
- Height: 1.73 m (5 ft 8 in)
- Position: Forward

Youth career
- FC Dinamo Sukhumi

Senior career*
Years	Team	Apps	(Gls)
1946–1947	FC Dinamo Sukhumi		
1948–1953	FC Dynamo Leningrad	109	(25)
1954	FC Dynamo Moscow	21	(8)
1955–1960	FC Zenit Leningrad	93	(16)

Managerial career
- 1960: FC Zenit Leningrad (assistant)
- 1960: FC Zenit Leningrad
- 1962–1963: FC Dynamo Leningrad
- 1962–1964: FC Dynamo Leningrad (team director)
- 1965–1966: FC Stroitel Ufa
- 1966: Dünamo Tallinn (team director)
- 1966–1968: FC Dynamo Leningrad (team director)
- 1966–1968: FC Dynamo Leningrad
- 1968–1973: FC Dynamo Leningrad (assistant)
- 1973–1976: FC Komsomolets Leningrad
- 1975: FC Volna-Briz Leningrad
- 1976–1978: Neftchi Baku
- 1978–1980: FC Daugava Riga
- 1980–1982: FC Zvezda Perm
- 1983–1988: FC Dynamo Leningrad
- * Club domestic league appearances and goals

Gennadi Borisovich Bondarenko (Russian: Геннадий Борисович Бондаренко; 4 February 1929 – 10 April 1989) was a Soviet Russian football player and coach.

== Honours ==
- Soviet Top League champion: 1954.
