= Konstantin Lemeshev =

Soviet Russian footballer and coach

Personal information
- Full name: Konstantin Ivanovich Lemeshev
- Date of birth: 7 April 1907
- Place of birth: St. Petersburg, Russia
- Date of death: 21 September 1950 (aged 43)
- Place of death: Leningrad, Russian SFSR
- Height: 1.80 m (5 ft 11 in)
- Positions: Defender; midfielder

Senior career*
Years	Team	Apps	(Gls)
1926–1932	Krasny Putilovets Leningrad		
1933–1935	FC Krasnaya Zarya Leningrad		
1936	FC Lokomotiv Leningrad		

Managerial career
- 1938–1940: FC Krasnaya Zarya Leningrad
- 1941–1945: FC Zenit Leningrad
- 1946: FC Pishchevik Leningrad
- 1948–1950: FC Zenit Leningrad
- * Club domestic league appearances and goals

Konstantin Ivanovich Lemeshev (Russian: Константин Иванович Лемешев; 7 April 1907 – 21 September 1950) was a Soviet Russian football player and coach. Coaching FC Zenit Leningrad, he continued even in declining health despite doctors' advice and was taken to the hospital during a home game, dying a few dates later.

He was an older brother of Vladimir Lemeshev.
