= Arkadi Alov =

Soviet footballer, coach, and referee

Personal information
- Full name: Arkadi Ivanovich Alov
- Date of birth: 4 December 1914
- Place of birth: Tarasovo, Yaroslavl Governorate, Russian Empire
- Date of death: 24 May 1982 (aged 67)
- Place of death: Leningrad, Russian SFSR
- Height: 1.76 m (5 ft 9 in)
- Position: Midfielder

Senior career*
Years	Team	Apps	(Gls)
1929–1936	Kirovsky Zavod Leningrad		
1937	Avangard Leningrad	11	(6)
1938–1947	Dynamo Leningrad	107	(31)
1949–1950	Zenit Leningrad	10	(0)
Total		128+	(37+)

Managerial career
- 1954–1955: FShM Leningrad (team director)
- 1956–1957: Zenit Leningrad
- 1957–1960: Skorokhod Leningrad
- 1961–1964: Sokol Leningrad
- 1965–1966: Dynamo Leningrad
- 1967: Zenit Leningrad
- 1969–1970: Neftyanik Fergana
- 1971–1976: Kirovets Leningrad
- * Club domestic league appearances and goals

Arkadi Ivanovich Alov (Russian: Аркадий Иванович Алов; 4 December 1914 – 24 May 1982) was a Soviet football player, coach, and referee.
