= Pyotr Filippov =

Russian Soviet footballer and coach

Personal information
- Full name: Pyotr Pavlovich Filippov
- Date of birth: 21 September 1893
- Place of birth: St. Petersburg, Russia
- Date of death: 9 October 1965 (aged 72)
- Place of death: Leningrad, Russian SFSR
- Position: Midfielder

Senior career*
| Years | Team | Apps | (Gls) |
| 1912–1914 | Norsemen FC (London) | | |
| 1912–1923 | FC Kolomyagi Petrograd | | |
| 1924 | FC Leningradskiy Uyezd Petrograd | | |
| 1925–1926 | FC Spartak of St. Petersburg Rayon A Leningrad | | |
| 1927–1928 | V.I. Lenin Stadium Leningrad | | |

International career
| 1924–1925 | USSR | 2 | (0) |

Managerial career
- 1936–1937: FC Stalinets Leningrad
- 1939: FC Dinamo Batumi
- 1940: FC Zenit Leningrad
- 1940: FC Dinamo Tbilisi
- 1948: FC Spartak Gatchina
- * Club domestic league appearances and goals

Pyotr Pavlovich Filippov (Russian: Пётр Павлович Филиппов; 21 September 1893 in Saint Petersburg – 9 October 1965 in Leningrad) was a Russian Soviet football player and coach.

== Honours ==
- RSFSR Champion: 1924.

== International career ==
Filippov made his debut for USSR on 16 November 1924 in a friendly against Turkey.
