= Stanislav Zavidonov =

Russian footballer and coach (1934–2021)

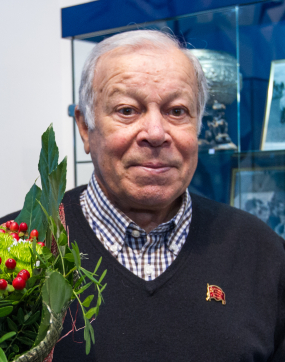
- Zavidonov in 2014

Personal information
- Full name: Stanislav Petrovich Zavidonov
- Date of birth: 14 October 1934
- Place of birth: Kansk, Russian SFSR
- Date of death: 28 December 2021 (aged 87)
- Height: 1.77 m (5 ft 10 in)
- Position: Midfielder

Youth career
- FC Trudovyye Rezervy Leningrad

Senior career*
Years	Team	Apps	(Gls)
1954–1956	FC Trudovyye Rezervy Leningrad	33	(1)
1957–1966	Zenit Leningrad	254	(31)

Managerial career
- 1967–1972: FC LOMO Leningrad
- 1972–1975: Zenit Leningrad (assistant)
- 1979–1982: ASM Oran
- 1988–1989: Zenit Leningrad
- 1990–1992: Zenit Saint Petersburg (VP)
- * Club domestic league appearances and goals

Stanislav Petrovich Zavidonov (Russian: Станислав Петрович Завидонов; 14 October 1934 – 28 December 2021) was a Russian football coach and player. Zavidonov died on 28 December 2021, at the age of 87.
