= Vladimir Golubev =

Soviet footballer and Russian coach (1950–2022)

Personal information
- Full name: Vladimir Yevgenyevich Golubev
- Date of birth: 16 April 1950
- Place of birth: Leningrad, Russian SFSR, Soviet Union
- Date of death: 19 September 2022 (aged 72)
- Position: Defender

Youth career
- Zenit Leningrad

Senior career*
Years	Team	Apps	(Gls)
1968–1981	Zenit Leningrad	335	(7)

International career
1977–1978	USSR	3	(0)

Managerial career
- 1987: Zenit Leningrad
- 1988–1989: Zenit Leningrad (assistant)
- 1989: Zenit Leningrad
- 2006–2008: FC Zenit-2 St. Petersburg
- 2018–2019: FC Leningradets Leningrad Oblast (assistant)
- * Club domestic league appearances and goals

Vladimir Yevgenyevich Golubev (Russian: Владимир Евгеньевич Голубев; 16 April 1950 – 19 September 2022) was a Russian football coach and a Soviet football player.

== International career ==
Golubev made his debut for USSR on 7 September 1977 in a friendly against Poland.
