= Pavel Batyrev =

Russian football coach (1897–1967)

Personal information
- Full name: Pavel Vasilyevich Batyrev
- Date of birth: 25 February 1897
- Place of birth: Lopatino, Yaroslavl Governorate, Russian Empire
- Date of death: 14 February 1967 (aged 69)
- Place of death: Leningrad, RSFSR, USSR
- Height: 1.80 m (5 ft 11 in)
- Position: Midfielder

Senior career*
Years	Team	Apps	(Gls)
1915–1918	Sport (Petrograd)		
1919–1920	Kolomyagi		
1920–1923	Sport (Petrograd)		
1924–1926	Spartak (Petrograd district)		
1927–1935	FC Dynamo Saint Petersburg		

Managerial career
- 1936: FC Dynamo Saint Petersburg
- 1936–1938: FC Spartak Leningrad
- 1939: FC Dynamo Saint Petersburg
- 1940–1941: FC Spartak Leningrad
- 1946–1948: FC Spartak Leningrad
- * Club domestic league appearances and goals as of 16:11, 11 June 2015 (UTC)

Pavel Vasilyevich Batyrev (Russian: Па́вел Васи́льевич Ба́тырев; 13 (25) February 1897 in the village of Lopatino, Yaroslavl Governorate, Russian Empire - 14 February 1967, Leningrad, RSFSR, USSR) was a Soviet football coach. Honored Master of Sports of the USSR (1934).

He plays for Petrograd / Leningrad and the Russian Federation (1923-1929, team captain).

Champion of the RSFSR in 1924 and 1932; 2nd prize winner - 1928, 1931. 2nd prize winner of the USSR 1924, 1932 (in which - 3 matches).

In 1924-1927 he trained with the USSR national team. Member of the USSR national team travel to Turkey (1925), Germany, Austria, Latvia (1926–27), the Russian Federation team in Scandinavia, Finland, Germany, Estonia (1923).

At the same time he played for Leningrad Bandy (1922–33). Champion of the USSR in 1928, 2nd prize winner in 1924, 1933, 3rd prize winner of 1936. Champion of the RSFSR in 1924, 1926, 1927, 1928. The team of the USSR (1928) - 2 matches, 2 goals.

Playing coach (1931–35) and head coach of Dynamo (Leningrad) (1936, to June, 1939, September). The head coach of Spartak (Leningrad) (1936-1938, 1940-1941, 1946–48).

Member of the 1917 October Revolution, the deputy of the Petrograd Soviet 1919-22.

In July 1941, together with a team of Spartak went as a volunteer to the front in 1941-1944 fought on the Leningrad and Volkhov fronts.

Since 1968 played Batyrev Cup memory.
