= Solntsev =

Solntsev (Russian: Солнцев, from солнце meaning sun) is a Russian masculine surname, its feminine counterpart is Solntseva. It may refer to

- Fedor Solntsev (1801–1892), Russian painter and historian of art
- Yuliya Solntseva (1901–1989), Soviet film director and actress
- Yuri Solntsev (born 1980), Russian football player
