= Yuri Solntsev =

Russian footballer

Personal information
- Full name: Yuri Sergeyevich Solntsev
- Date of birth: 6 June 1980 (age 46)
- Height: 1.80 m (5 ft 11 in)
- Positions: Defender; midfielder

Youth career
- FC Zenit St. Petersburg

Senior career*
Years	Team	Apps	(Gls)
1998	FC Dynamo St. Petersburg	20	(2)
1999–2000	FC Torpedo-2 Moscow	59	(2)
2001	FC Lokomotiv-Zenit-2 St. Petersburg	18	(0)
2001	FC Dynamo-SPb St. Petersburg	19	(1)
2002	FC BSK Spirovo	31	(1)
2003	FC Dynamo-SPb St. Petersburg	21	(0)
2004	FC Lada Togliatti	19	(2)
2004	FC Shinnik Yaroslavl	4	(0)
2005	FC Nosta Novotroitsk	17	(0)
2005–2006	FC Volga Nizhny Novgorod	34	(1)
2007	FC Dynamo Vologda	30	(3)
2008–2009	FC Spartak Kostroma	68	(3)
2010–2013	FC Gubkin	81	(8)
2013–2014	FC Tosno	27	(1)
2014–2015	FC Dynamo St. Petersburg	32	(0)
2015–2016	FC Oryol	40	(1)
2016–2018	FC LAZ Luga	?	(?)

Managerial career
- 2019–: FC Dynamo St. Petersburg
- * Club domestic league appearances and goals as of 30 April 2019

Yuri Sergeyevich Solntsev (Russian: Юрий Сергеевич Солнцев; born 6 June 1980) is a Russian football coach and a former professional footballer. He made his debut in the Russian Premier League in 2004 for FC Shinnik Yaroslavl. Currently, he works as a manager with newly established FC Dynamo St. Petersburg.
