= 1963 Soviet Top League =

25th season of top-tier football league in Soviet Union

Class A, Pervaya Gruppa
- Season: 1963
- Dates: 31 March – 29 November 1963
- Champions: Dynamo Moscow; 10th Soviet top-tier title
- Relegated: Dynamo Leningrad; Lokomotiv Moscow; Ararat Yerevan; Avangard Kharkov; Pakhtakor Tashkent
- Top goalscorer: Oleg Kopayev (27)

The 1963 Class A, Pervaya Gruppa (Russian: класс «А», первая группа) was the 25th season of top-tier football league in Soviet Union. Due to reorganization of the Soviet Union football competition by adding an extra tier, this season the top tier was renamed as Class A, Pervaya Gruppa compared to previously named as Class A.

20 teams took part in the league with FC Dynamo Moscow winning the championship. Spartak Moscow were the defending champions and came second trailing three points behind.

== Team changes ==
Both Baltic clubs Daugava Rīga and Žalgiris Vilnius were relegated the last season to the Class A, Vtoraya Gruppa after finishing in the last two places. There were no new teams promoted to the league due to the reorganization and number of participants was reduced from 22 to 20.

Belarus Minsk changed its name to Dinamo Minsk, Spartak Yerevan changed its name to Ararat Yerevan.

== League standings ==
Pos	Team	Pld	W	D	L	GF	GA	GD	Pts	Qualification
1	(Russian Soviet Federative Socialist Republic) Dynamo Moscow (C)	38	21	13	4	47	14	+33	55	League champions
2	(Russian Soviet Federative Socialist Republic) Spartak Moscow	38	22	8	8	65	33	+32	52	
3	(Byelorussian Soviet Socialist Republic) Dinamo Minsk	38	18	12	8	47	27	+20	48	
4	(Russian Soviet Federative Socialist Republic) SKA Rostov-on-Don	38	20	7	11	73	40	+33	47	
5	(Georgian Soviet Socialist Republic) Dinamo Tbilisi	38	17	13	8	56	42	+14	47	
6	(Russian Soviet Federative Socialist Republic) Zenit Leningrad	38	14	17	7	45	32	+13	45	
7	(Russian Soviet Federative Socialist Republic) CSKA Moscow	38	14	17	7	39	27	+12	45	
8	(Azerbaijan Soviet Socialist Republic) Neftyanik Baku	38	18	9	11	48	44	+4	45	
9	(Ukrainian Soviet Socialist Republic) Dynamo Kyiv	38	16	12	10	68	48	+20	44	
10	(Russian Soviet Federative Socialist Republic) Torpedo Moscow	38	12	16	10	46	41	+5	40	
11	(Ukrainian Soviet Socialist Republic) Shakhtar Donetsk	38	11	14	13	29	33	−4	36	
12	(Georgian Soviet Socialist Republic) Torpedo Kutaisi	38	6	21	11	22	37	−15	33	
13	(Moldavian Soviet Socialist Republic) Moldova Chisinau	38	8	16	14	27	43	−16	32	
14	(Kazakh Soviet Socialist Republic) Kairat Alma-Ata	38	10	12	16	28	47	−19	32	
15	(Russian Soviet Federative Socialist Republic) Krylya Sovetov Kuybyshev	38	11	7	20	45	53	−8	29	
16	(Russian Soviet Federative Socialist Republic) Dynamo Leningrad (R)	38	7	15	16	37	51	−14	29	Relegation to Class A Second Group
17	(Russian Soviet Federative Socialist Republic) Lokomotiv Moscow (R)	38	5	19	14	37	54	−17	29	Relegation to Class A Second Group
18	(Armenian Soviet Socialist Republic) Ararat Yerevan (R)	38	9	8	21	34	57	−23	26	Relegation to Class A Second Group
19	(Ukrainian Soviet Socialist Republic) Avangard Kharkov (R)	38	6	13	19	25	56	−31	25	Relegation to Class A Second Group
20	(Uzbek Soviet Socialist Republic) Pakhtakor Tashkent (R)	38	4	13	21	44	83	−39	21	Relegation to Class A Second Group

Source: rsssf.com
(C) Champions; (R) Relegated

== Results ==
Home \ Away	ARA	AVA	CSK	DYK	DLE	DMN	DYN	DTB	KAI	KRY	LOK	MOL	NEF	PAK	SHA	SKA	SPA	TKU	TOR	ZEN
Ararat Yerevan		0–0	0–1	1–3	1–1	3–0	0–3	1–1	2–0	2–1	1–0	3–1	1–2	5–1	0–0	0–3	0–3	2–0	0–1	3–4
Avangard Kharkov	1–0		0–1	1–1	1–0	1–2	0–0	1–2	1–1	3–1	0–0	2–1	1–1	2–1	0–0	0–2	1–4	1–1	2–0	1–1
CSKA Moscow	0–0	0–0		3–2	4–0	0–2	0–0	3–0	1–0	1–0	2–2	0–0	1–2	1–0	1–0	2–1	1–2	0–1	0–0	0–1
Dynamo Kyiv	5–0	2–0	0–0		3–2	1–0	0–1	5–1	4–1	2–1	0–0	0–0	0–0	4–1	3–1	2–0	2–1	1–1	1–1	0–0
Dynamo Leningrad	4–1	3–2	1–1	1–5		0–0	0–0	2–0	0–0	4–1	1–1	0–0	0–1	0–0	2–0	2–1	0–2	5–0	0–0	1–1
Dinamo Minsk	3–1	2–1	1–1	1–4	2–0		2–0	3–0	3–0	0–0	1–0	2–0	1–0	6–1	0–0	0–2	1–0	1–0	1–1	0–0
Dynamo Moscow	1–0	4–0	1–2	1–1	1–0	0–2		2–0	2–0	2–1	3–1	0–0	3–1	2–0	0–0	3–2	0–0	0–1	1–0	1–0
Dinamo Tbilisi	2–2	4–0	0–0	1–0	3–0	0–0	0–0		3–1	1–0	2–2	3–0	2–0	4–2	2–1	0–1	1–0	1–1	1–0	4–0
Kairat Alma-Ata	2–0	1–1	1–1	1–0	2–0	0–1	0–0	1–2		2–1	0–0	2–0	3–0	1–0	1–0	1–1	0–1	0–0	1–0	1–1
Krylya Sovetov Kuybyshev	2–0	2–0	4–0	3–1	2–2	1–0	0–1	0–0	4–0		1–0	3–3	0–1	1–0	2–0	1–0	1–3	3–0	0–2	0–2
Lokomotiv Moscow	2–1	0–0	0–0	1–1	1–1	0–2	0–2	2–3	1–1	2–2		2–0	2–4	2–0	2–2	1–5	0–1	0–1	1–2	0–3
Moldova Chisinau	2–0	2–0	0–0	1–0	1–0	0–0	1–3	0–0	0–0	0–0	0–0		0–0	4–2	1–0	2–3	0–3	0–0	1–1	1–0
Neftyanik Baku	2–0	1–0	0–1	3–2	2–1	0–4	0–2	1–3	2–1	1–0	3–3	4–2		1–0	1–1	2–1	1–1	2–1	0–0	0–1
Pakhtakor Tashkent	2–2	0–0	1–6	1–1	1–0	2–0	0–4	2–2	1–1	5–2	5–2	1–2	1–5		0–1	0–0	2–2	0–0	0–0	2–4
Shakhtar Donetsk	1–0	1–0	0–3	3–1	2–1	0–0	0–0	1–1	2–0	1–0	0–0	1–0	0–1	3–2		0–1	1–1	2–0	0–0	0–0
SKA Rostov-on-Don	0–1	7–1	1–1	3–3	4–0	3–1	0–0	3–0	4–0	4–1	2–2	2–0	1–0	4–0	3–2		1–0	2–1	2–0	1–3
Spartak Moscow	1–0	2–0	3–0	3–1	3–1	2–2	0–1	2–1	2–0	2–0	1–3	3–0	4–2	4–4	1–0	2–0		1–0	1–2	0–0
Torpedo Kutaisi	2–0	1–0	0–0	1–4	0–0	1–1	0–0	0–0	0–2	1–1	1–1	0–0	0–0	1–1	0–0	1–1	0–1		2–1	0–0
Torpedo Moscow	0–1	3–1	1–1	7–1	1–1	0–0	0–3	1–4	3–0	3–2	0–0	2–2	0–2	3–2	3–1	2–1	2–2	1–1		3–2
Zenit Leningrad	0–0	2–0	0–0	1–2	1–1	2–0	0–0	2–2	3–0	2–1	0–1	1–0	0–0	1–1	0–2	3–1	2–1	2–2	0–0	

Legend: Blue = home team win; Yellow = draw; Red = away team win.

== Top scorers ==
27 goals

- Oleg Kopayev (SKA Rostov-on-Don)

21 goals

- Eduard Malofeyev (Dinamo Minsk)

17 goals

- Valentin Ivanov (Torpedo Moscow)

16 goals

- Boris Kazakov (Krylia Sovetov)

15 goals

- Vladimir Barkaya (Dinamo Tbilisi)
- Yuri Sevidov (Spartak Moscow)

14 goals

- Oleh Bazilevich (Dynamo Kyiv)
- Viktor Kanevski (Dynamo Kyiv)
- Gennadi Krasnitsky (Pakhtakor)
- Galimzyan Khusainov (Spartak Moscow)
