= Metaratings =

Sports newspaper

- Type: Daily sports newspaper
- Format: Analytical website
- Founded: 24 December 2018
- Language: Russian, English
- Website: metaratings.ru

Metaratings.ru (also known as Metaratings) is a sports media about bookmakers, sports betting and tips in both English and Russian, with a dedicated team based in Moscow, Russia.

== History ==
Metaratings was launched on December 24, 2018 and was initially developed as an aggregator of ratings and reviews of bookmaker companies. The editor-in-chief is Sergey Bregovsky. It has several regional versions, including editions focused on Belarus, Russia (metaratings.ru), United States, Tajikistan, Uzbekistan, and Ukraine (meta-ratings.com.ua).

In 2021 it became an information partner for FC Shakhter Karagandy, FC Baltika Kaliningrad, and handball club CSKA Moscow.

== Content ==
The media specialize in football, ice hockey, and esports. According to a study conducted by Medialogia, Metaratings ranked 10th in the top 20 most quoted media in the sports industry in 2020.

== Awards ==
- Golden Web Award 2020 – special prize in the "Startup Web" category.
