= Georgi Lasin =

Soviet Russian footballer

Personal information
- Full name: Georgi Semyonovich Lasin
- Date of birth: 5 February 1914
- Place of birth: St. Petersburg, Russia
- Date of death: 21 October 2004 (aged 90)
- Place of death: St. Petersburg, Russia
- Position: Forward

Senior career*
Years	Team	Apps	(Gls)
1935–1937	ShVSM Leningrad		
1937	GOLIFK Leningrad		
1938–1940	Stalinets Leningrad	45	(6)
1940	GOLIFK Leningrad		
1942–1944	Dinamo Frunze		
1945–1946	Spartak Leningrad		

Managerial career
- 1940–1986: GOLIFK Leningrad (assistant)
- 1947–1950: FC Zenit Leningrad (assistant)
- 1950–1951: FC Zenit Leningrad
- 1952: FC Zenit Leningrad (assistant)
- 1954–1955: FC Trudovyye Rezervy Leningrad (assistant)
- 1957–1958: China (assistant)
- 1965–1968: Afghanistan (assistant)
- * Club domestic league appearances and goals

Georgi Semyonovich Lasin (Russian: Георгий Семёнович Ласин; 5 February 1914 in St. Petersburg – 21 October 2004 in St. Petersburg) was a Soviet Russian football player and coach.
