= FC Zenit Saint Petersburg =

Association football club in Russia

Zenit
- Full name: Футбольный клуб Зенит
- Nicknames: Sine-Belo-Golubye (The Blue-White-Sky Blues); Zenitchiki (The Zeniters); L’vy (The Lions)
- Founded: 25 May 1925; 101 years ago
- Ground: Krestovsky Stadium
- Capacity: 67,800
- Owner: Gazprom
- President: Konstantin Zyryanov
- Manager: Sergei Semak
- League: Russian Premier League
- 2025–26: Russian Premier League, 1st of 16 (champions)
- Website: en.fc-zenit.ru

Football Club Zenit (Russian: Футбольный клуб «Зенит», romanized: Futbolny klub "Zenit", pronounced [fʊdˈbolʲnɨj ˈklub zʲɪˈnʲit]), also known as Zenit Saint Petersburg or simply Zenit, is a Russian professional football club based in Saint Petersburg. Founded in 1925 (or in 1914, according to some Russian sources), it had competed in the Soviet Top League from 1938 to 1989, winning the title in 1984. Nowadays, the club plays in the Russian Premier League and are the reigning champions. They won the 2007, 2010, 2011–12, 2014–15, 2018–19, 2019–20, 2020–21, 2021–22, 2022–23, 2023–24 and 2025–26 seasons of the Russian Premier League, as well as the 2007–08 UEFA Cup and the 2008 UEFA Super Cup. The club is owned and sponsored by the Russian state-owned energy giant Gazprom. The team plays its home matches at the Gazprom Arena. On 24 May 2023, Zenit became the first Russian sports club with 10 million followers on social media.

== History ==
=== Before Zenit ===
Zenit's history is tightly connected with the political history of Saint Petersburg, Russia (also called "Petrograd" and "Leningrad" at times in its history). In 1897, the first officially-recorded football match in Russia was held in Saint Petersburg on Vasilievsky Island, an unofficial game between the local English team "Ostrov" and the local Russian team "Petrograd," which the English team won, 6–0. The players of those local teams were amateurs and loosely associated with each other.

=== Formation of Zenit ===
The original Zenit team stemmed from several football teams, which changed names and owners many times during the Soviet era after the Revolution of 1917, as powerful political forces manipulated the careers of individual players as well as the fate of the whole team. The club was renamed several times and its owners and leaders were under political pressure for many decades. The origins of Zenit date back to the beginning of the 20th century to several predecessor teams in Saint Petersburg that were playing locally. The oldest documented predecessor of Zenit was the team "Murzinka," founded in 1914, which played in the Obukhovsky stadium from 1914 until 1924, when the team came to be known as "Bolshevik" (the new name for Obukhovsky industry and its stadium). The team and stadium survived the drama of World War I, the Bolshevik revolution of 1917, and the Russian Civil War of 1918 to 1922.

In 1925, another predecessor team of Zenit was formed, of workers from the Leningradsky Metallichesky Zavod (Leningrad Metal Plant); they were called the "Stalinets" in the 1930s. (Stalinets translates literally to English as "Stalinist"; however, in Russian, the name is a play on words as stal means "steel".) Historians documented that both predecessor teams of Zenit were playing independently until their official merger at the end of 1939. The Stalinets were not the same team named Zenit that took part in the 1938 USSR championship. The current name of FC Zenit was registered in 1936 (as Bolshevik became part of the Zenit sports society and was renamed), three years before the Stalinets merged with it. The name Zenit means "Zenith".

In 1939, during the rule of Joseph Stalin, Leningradsky Metallichesky Zavod became part of the military industry and its sports teams, players, and managers were transferred to the Zenit sports society. FC Zenit was ordered to take in members of the "Stalinets" metallurgical workers' team after the end of the 1939 season.

=== Zenit in the Soviet League ===
Zenit won their first honours in 1944, claiming the war-time USSR Cup after defeating CSKA Moscow in the well-attended final. The club was always adored in Leningrad, but was not able to make much of a significant impact in the Soviet League. In 1967, Zenit finished last but were saved from relegation because the Soviet leadership decided it would not be prudent to relegate a Leningrad team during the 50th anniversary of the October Revolution, which occurred in the city. Composer Dmitry Shostakovich and film star Kirill Lavrov were well known as ardent supporters of Zenit, a passion that is reflected in their attendance of many games. Zenit won the bronze medal in 1980, also reaching the Soviet Cup Final and winning the Soviet League title in 1984. In 1985, Zenit beat the Soviet Cup holder in the Soviet Super Cup (also called the Season Cup).

=== Zenit in the Russian League ===
The LOMO optical plant took up the ownership of the team after the war. In 1990, FC Zenit were re-registered as an independent city-owned professional club. In 1992, After being relegated in the first year of the Russian League, Zenit returned to the top flight in 1996 and has been decent since. They claimed the 1999 Russian Cup, finished third in the League in 2001, made the Cup final in 2002, became the runners-up in the Premier League and won the Russian Premier League Cup in 2003.

=== Gazprom era ===
In December 2005, Gazprom took a controlling stake in the club. The deal was announced by Valentina Matviyenko, the Saint Petersburg governor. Gazprom bought the majority of the club.

==== Under Advocaat ====
Although Zenit reached the quarter-finals of the UEFA Cup in 2006, a mediocre start to the league season led to the summer replacement of coach Vlastimil Petržela. In July 2006, Dick Advocaat took over as Zenit's manager. Advocaat worked together with his assistant manager, former Netherlands national youth team coach Cor Pot. Zenit won the 2007 Russian Premier League—their best league achievement since winning the USSR Championship in 1984—allowing them to compete in the group stage of the 2008–09 UEFA Champions League.

In 2008, Zenit won the Russian Super Cup and reached the quarter-final of the UEFA Cup for the second time in their history. In the first leg of the quarter-final away game against German side Bayer Leverkusen, the team achieved a 4–1 victory. They qualified for the semi-finals of the competition for the first time in their history, despite a 1–0 home loss to Leverkusen in the second leg, and were drawn to play further German opposition in the semi-final, Bayern Munich, considered the top team remaining. A battling performance in the first leg of the semi-final earned Zenit a 1–1 draw away against Bayern Munich. In the second leg at home, Zenit won 4–0, defeating Bayern 5–1 on aggregate and going through to the UEFA Cup Final for the first time in club history, where they met Scottish side Rangers at the City of Manchester Stadium in Manchester on 14 May. Zenit won 2–0, with goals from Igor Denisov in the 72nd minute and Konstantin Zyryanov in stoppage time, to lift the club's first-ever UEFA Cup. Andrey Arshavin was named man of the match.

On 29 August 2008, at the Stade Louis II in Monaco, Zenit then defeated Manchester United 2–1 in the 2008 UEFA Super Cup, becoming the first Russian side to win the trophy. Pavel Pogrebnyak scored the first goal and Danny scored the second, the latter being named man of the match in his debut for Zenit.

In the 2008–09 Champions League group stage, Zenit was grouped with Real Madrid, Juventus and BATE Borisov in Group H, which by some was marked as the "group of death." Zenit ultimately finished in third place in the group, behind Juventus and Real Madrid, and was thus unable to progress to the knockout phase of the competition. This position, however, was good enough to earn the club a place in the 2008–09 UEFA Cup last 32, where the team faced VfB Stuttgart for a place in the last 16 of the competition. After defeating Stuttgart on away goals, Zenit went on to lose 2–1 over two legs against Italian club Udinese.

==== Under Spalletti ====
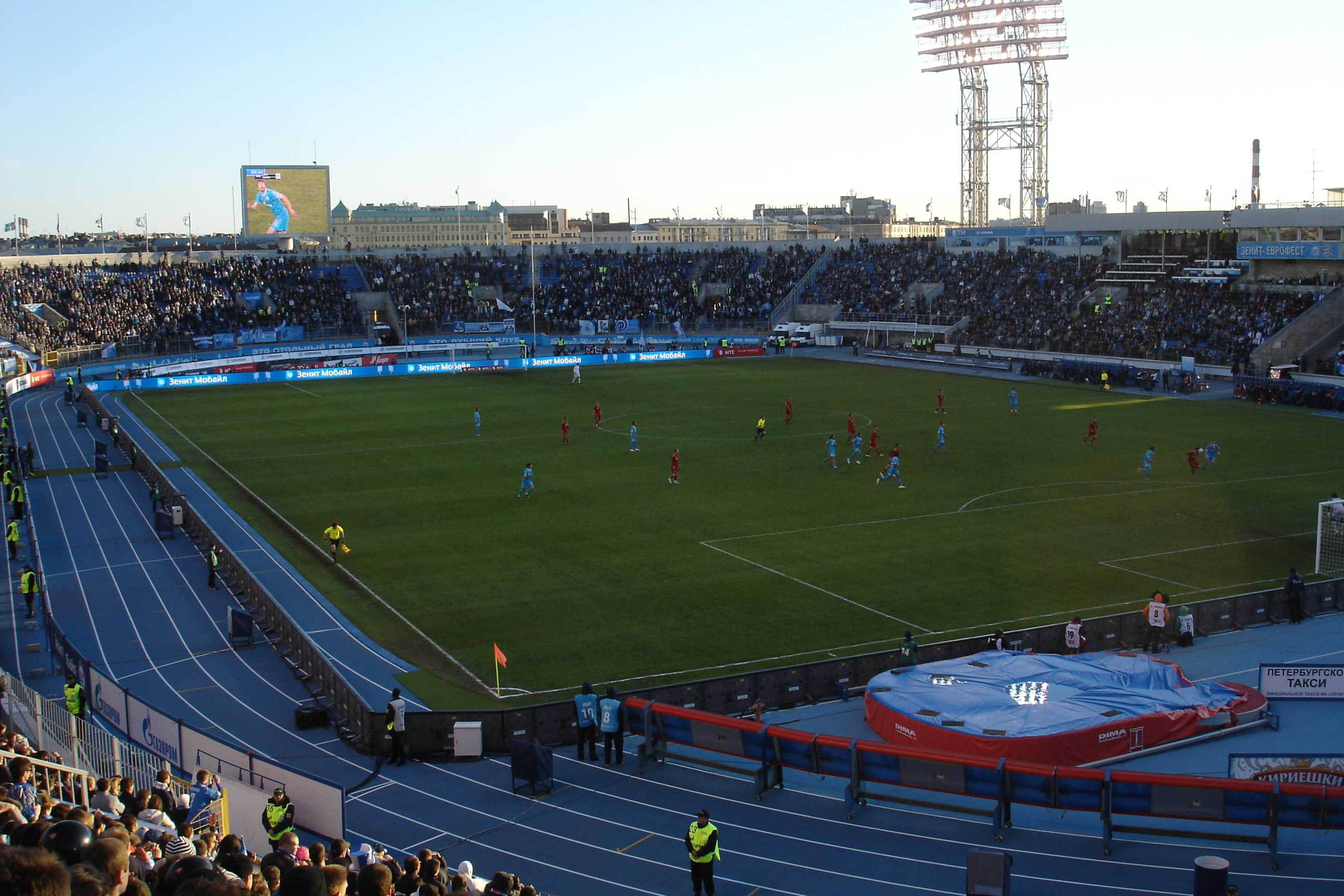
Zenit against Bayern Munich in 2011

Luciano Spalletti signed a contract with Zenit in December 2009, with Italian coaches Daniele Baldini, Marco Domenichini and Alberto Bartali also joining the Russian club. The Board of Zenit mandated him to return the Russian Premier League title to Zenit, win the Russian Cup and progress from the group stage of the Champions League in his first year.

Zenit won the Russian Cup on 16 May 2010 after beating Sibir Novosibirsk in the final (previously beating Volga Tver in the quarter-finals and Amkar Perm in the semi-finals). After 16 games in the 2010 Premier League, with 12 wins and four draws, Zenit claimed 40 points, setting a new Russian Premier League record for most points won at that stage of the campaign.

On 25 August 2010, Zenit lost its first game under Spalletti to French side Auxerre and failed to advance to the Champions League group stage, instead participating in the Europa League. On 3 October, Zenit beat Spartak Nalchik to set another Russian Premier League record for most consecutive games going undefeated, with 21 games since the start of the league season. On 27 October, however, Zenit suffered its first defeat of the season at the hands of rival club Spartak Moscow, just seven games short of finishing the championship undefeated. On 14 November, Zenit defeated Rostov and two games prior to the end of the season won the championship title, the first in Spalletti's managerial career.

Zenit progressed through the knockout stage of the 2010–11 Europa League in first place, then beating Swiss side Young Boys in the Round of 16. On 6 March 2011, Zenit won against CSKA Moscow in the Russian Super Cup, the third Russian trophy won under Spalletti. On 17 March, however, Zenit were knocked out of the Europa League, losing to Dutch team Twente 2–3 on aggregate in the quarter-finals.

In the 2011–12 Champions League, Zenit began the group stage drawn into Group G alongside Porto, Shakhtar Donetsk and APOEL. On 6 December 2011, the team finished the group stage in second place and for the first time in club's history qualified for the spring knockout phase of Champions League. In the Round of 16, Zenit were drawn with Portuguese side Benfica, winning the first leg 3–2 at home through two goals from Roman Shirokov and one from Sergei Semak. In the second leg in Lisbon, however, Zenit lost 2–0 and were thus eliminated from the competition.

In April 2012, Zenit won their second-straight Russian Championship after beating Dynamo Moscow.

==== Under Villas-Boas ====
After a series of disappointing results in both the Champions League and the Premier League, Spalletti was fired on 11 March 2014. A week later, the club announced they had negotiated a two-year deal with André Villas-Boas, who himself had been released a few months prior after a disappointing stint as manager of English side Tottenham Hotspur. In the 2014–15 Europa League, Zenit were eliminated in the quarter-finals by eventual champions Sevilla. In May 2015, Zenit won the Russian Championship, the first championship title under Villas-Boas and the team's fifth-ever on the eve of its 90th anniversary celebration. Zenit then defeated Lokomotiv Moscow in the 2015 Russian Super Cup 1–1 (4–2 on penalties).

Later in the 2015 calendar year, Villas-Boas said that he would be leaving the club after the 2015–16 season. In the 2015–16 Champions League, Zenit began the competition in the group stage. They were drawn in Group H alongside Valencia, Lyon and Gent. They ended the group stage with their best group stage finish ever, winning five out of six matches and emerging as group winners. They were, however, eliminated from the competition in the Round of 16 by Portuguese side Benfica.

On 24 May 2016 Villas-Boas left the club at the end of the season, with Mircea Lucescu appointed the new manager of Zenit.

==== Under Lucescu and Mancini ====
In July 2016 Zenit won the Russian Super Cup after a 0–1 victory over CSKA Moscow.

During the 2016–17 Europa League, Zenit began the group stage drawn into Group D alongside Maccabi Tel Aviv, AZ Alkmaar and Dundalk. On 8 December 2016, the team finished the group stage in first place and qualified for the spring knockout phase of Europa League. In the round of 32, Zenit faced R.S.C. Anderlecht and was eliminated 3–3 on aggregate due to the away goals rule. In the league, Zenit's performances in the spring were disappointing and as such the club finished third and missed out on the Champions League for the second year in a row. Zenit was also eliminated in the round of 16 by FC Anzhi Makhachkala 0–4 on aggregate after an abysmal performance. The first (and last) season of Mircea Lucescu was a complete disappointment despite the expectations.

On 1 June 2017 Zenit appointed Roberto Mancini as the new manager of the team. On 13 May 2018, Mancini terminated his contract by mutual consent.

==== Under Semak ====
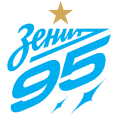
FC Zenit logo during the 95th birthday celebrations at May 2020.

In May 2018, Mancini left to become the head coach of the Italy national football team. Sergey Semak became the new manager of Zenit, receiving a two-year contract.

In August 2018, during the 1st leg of the 3rd qualification round of the UEFA Europa League, Zenit suffered a 0–4 loss to Dynamo Minsk. During the 2nd leg back on home ground, Zenit made a comeback winning 8–1, scoring 3 goals in the second half and 4 goals in the second half of the extra time, with 2 goals scored in the 120th minute. Zenit went on to beat Molde FK 4–3 on aggregate in the next round, entering the group stage of 2018-19 UEFA Europa League.

In March 2020, the league was forced to halt due to the COVID-19 pandemic in Russia. Zenit secured another title on 5 July 2020 after a victory over FC Krasnodar, with 4 games left to play in the tournament.

On 2 May 2021, Zenit secured their third title in a row in a 6–1 victory over second-place FC Lokomotiv Moscow. Zenit opened the 2021–22 season with a seventh win in the Russian Super Cup after a 3–0 win over Lokomotiv Moscow, but without major key players who left the club like Yuri Zhirkov, Andrei Lunev, and Sebastián Driussi.

After the 2022 Russian invasion of Ukraine, former Ukrainian international Yaroslav Rakitskiy made a pro-Ukrainian post on Instagram and severed his contract with the team. FIFA and the UEFA indefinitely suspended the team from their competitions. In addition, the European Club Association suspended the team.

On 30 April 2022, Zenit secured their fourth title in a row and eighth overall. Many of Zenit's foreign players have not been able to leave Russia, unable to secure moves away from Russian clubs, due to international sanctions placed upon the country as a result of Russia's invasion of Ukraine.

On 7 May 2023, Zenit secured their fifth title in a row and ninth overall.

In 2024, Zenit was one of the organizers of the Equality Cup, an international football tournament.

On 25 May 2024, Zenit won their sixth title in a row dramatically on the last day of the season, as league-leading Dynamo Moscow lost to third-placed Krasnodar, allowing Zenit to come back to the top. The winning goal in Zenit's game against Rostov was scored in the 85th minute by Artur. On 2 June 2024, Zenit won the Russian Cup with a late-comeback 2–1 victory over Baltika Kaliningrad, Nuraly Alip scored the winning goal in the 5th added minute. On 13 July 2024, Zenit won the 2024 Russian Super Cup.

On 17 May 2026, Zenit won their 11th Russian Premier League title.

Douglas Santos and Luiz Henrique were selected by Carlo Ancelotti to represent Brazil at the 2026 FIFA World Cup.

== Stadiums ==
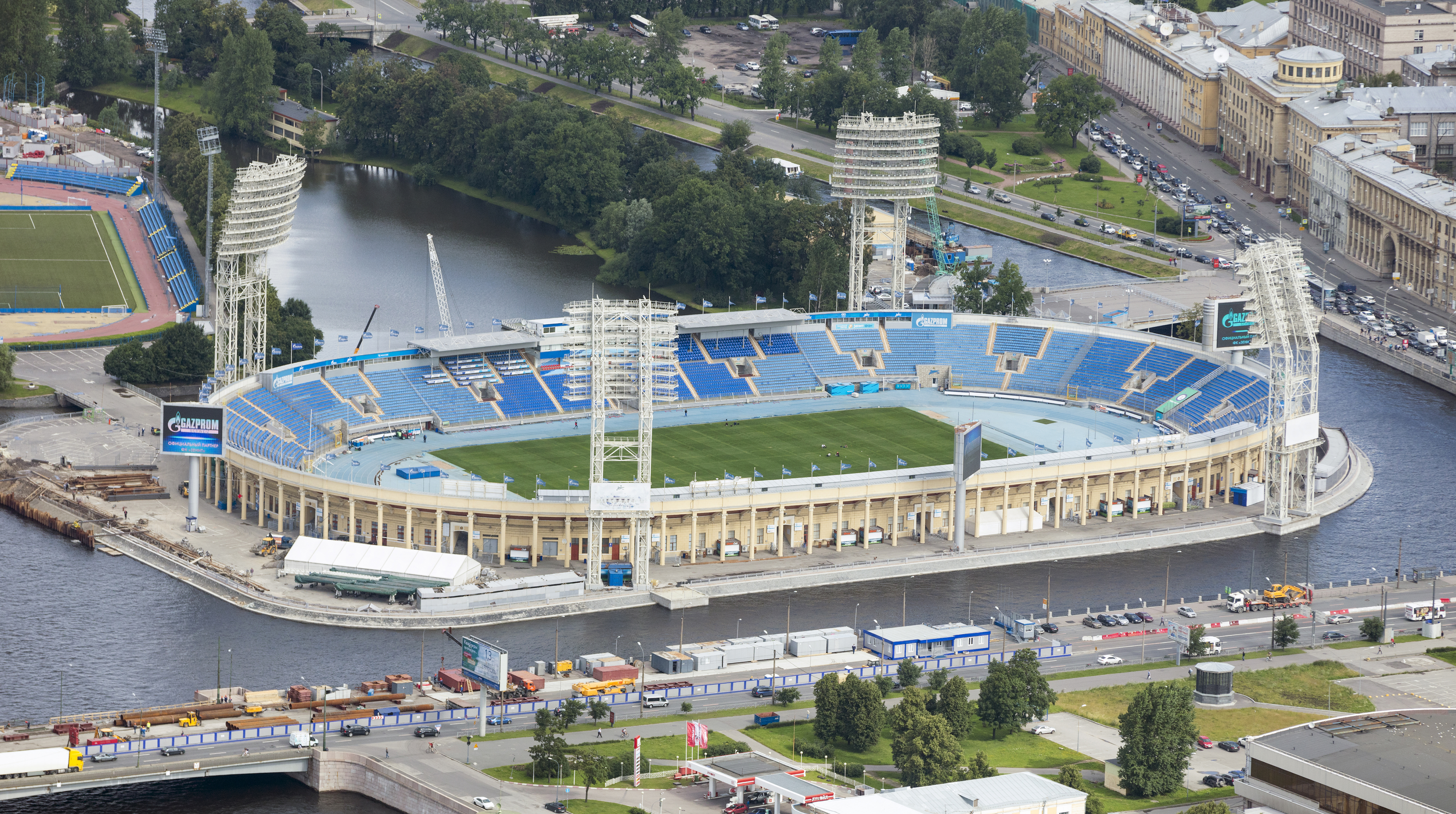
Petrovsky Stadium

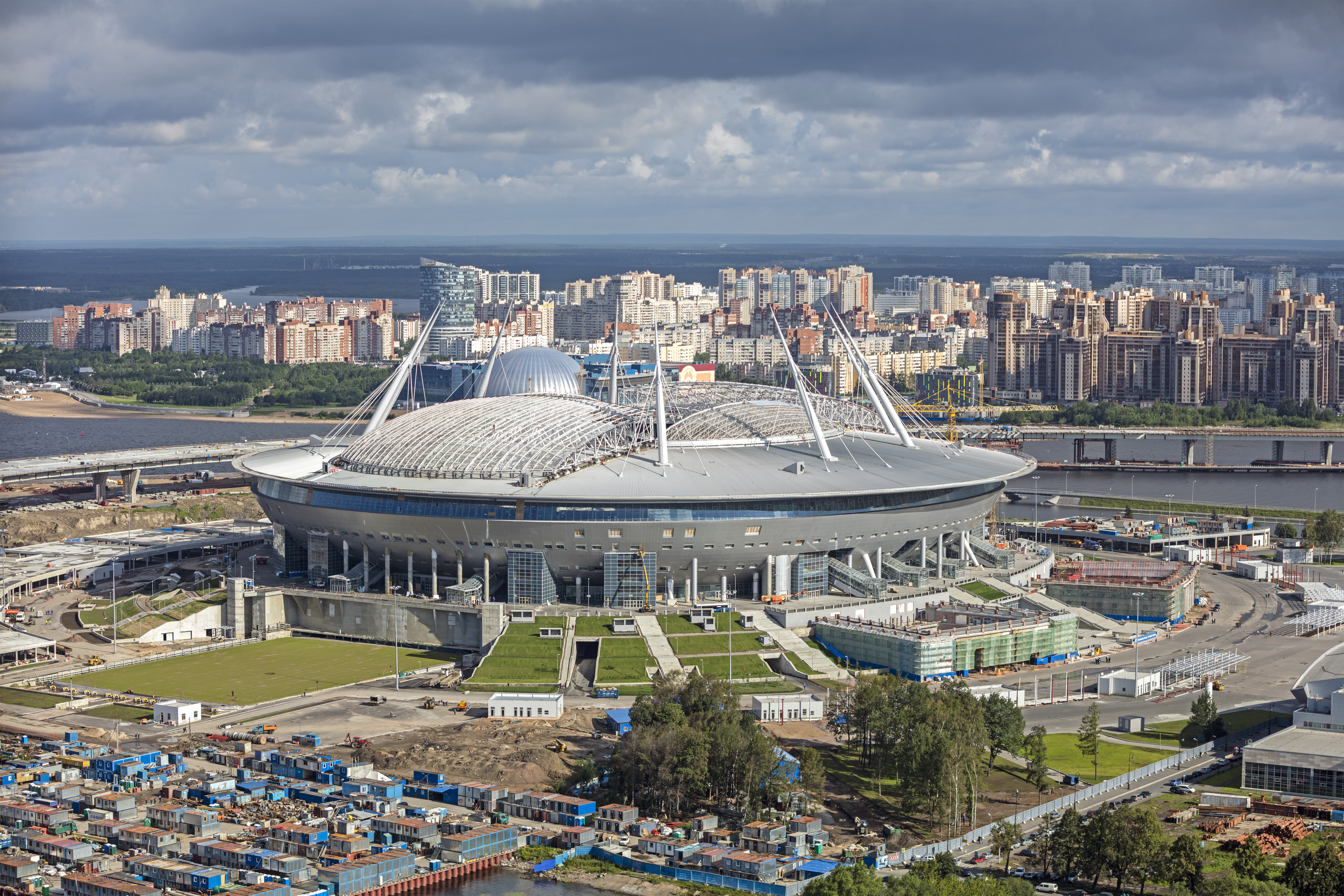
Krestovsky Stadium

Zenit's home ground is now the 67,800-capacity Krestovsky Stadium, known as Gazprom Arena for sponsorship reasons, in Saint Petersburg. Petrovsky Stadium used to be the home ground of the team before the new Krestovsky Stadium was built. Before moving to the Petrovsky Stadium, Zenit's home ground was the Kirov Stadium. It stood on the site where the Krestovsky Stadium was later erected.

== Honours ==
=== Domestic competitions ===
- Soviet Top League / Russian Premier League
  - Champions (12): 1984, 2007, 2010, 2011–12, 2014–15, 2018–19, 2019–20, 2020–21, 2021–22, 2022–23, 2023–24, 2025–26
- Soviet Cup / Russian Cup
  - Winners (6): 1944, 1998–99, 2009–10, 2015–16, 2019–20, 2023–24
  - Runners-up: 1939, 1984, 2001–02
- Soviet Super Cup / Russian Super Cup
  - Winners (11) (record): 1984, 2008, 2011, 2015, 2016, 2020, 2021, 2022, 2023, 2024, 2026
  - Runners-up: 2012, 2013, 2019
- USSR Federation Cup / Russian Premier League Cup
  - Winners: 2003
  - Runners-up: 1986
- Soviet First League / Russian National Football League
  - Runners-up: 1993 (Center)

=== International competitions ===
- UEFA Cup
  - Winners: 2007–08
- UEFA Super Cup
  - Winners: 2008
- The Atlantic Cup
  - Winners (2): 2016, 2022

== League and cup history ==
=== Soviet Union ===
Season	Div.	Pos.	Pl.	W	D	L	GS	GA	P	Domestic Cup	Europe	
1936	2nd	3	6				9	9	13			
1936	2nd	6	7				6	13	12	Round of 16		
1937	2nd	4	12				22	18	25	Round of 128		
1938	1st	14	25	7	10	8	38	57	24	Round of 16		
1939	1st	11	26	7	7	12	30	46	21	Runner-up		
1940	1st	10	24	6	6	12	37	42	18			
1944										Winner		
1945	1st	6		8	7	7	35	31	23	Semi-final		
1946	1st	9	22	5	5	12	22	45	15	Round of 16		
1947	1st	6	24	10	2	12	35	49	22	Quarter-final		
1948	1st	13	26	4	9	13	29	48	17	Round of 16		
1949	1st	5	34	17	8	9	48	48	42	Quarter-final		
1950	1st	6	36	19	5	12	70	59	43	Quarter-final		
1951	1st	7	28	10	8	10	36	40	28	Round of 16		
1952	1st	7	13	6	2	5	20	21	14	Quarter-final		
1953	1st	5	20	11	1	8	25	21	23	Round of 16		
1954	1st	7	24	8	7	9	27	26	23	Semi-final		
1955	1st	8	22	5	8	9	23	36	18	Round of 16		
1956	1st	9	22	4	11	7	27	43	19			
1957	1st	10	22	4	7	11	23	41	15	Round of 16		
1958	1st	4	22	9	8	5	41	32	26	Round of 16		
1959	1st	8	22	8	4	10	29	38	20			
1960	1st	15	30	14	5	11	47	37	33	Round of 32		
1961	1st	13	32	12	8	12	50	52	32	Semi-final		
1962	1st	11	32	11	7	14	53	42	29	Round of 32		
1963	1st	6	38	14	17	7	45	32	45	Round of 32		
1964	1st	11	32	9	9	14	30	35	27	Round of 16		
1965	1st	9	32	10	12	10	32	32	32	Round of 32		
1966	1st	16	36	10	8	18	35	54	28	Round of 16		
1967	1st	19	36	6	9	21	28	63	21	Round of 32		
1968	1st	11	38	10	14	14	35	49	34	Round of 32		
1969	1st	9	26	6	9	11	21	34	21	Round of 16		
1970	1st	14	32	10	7	15	30	40	27	Quarter-final		
1971	1st	13	30	8	10	12	29	32	26	Quarter-final		
1972	1st	7	30	11	11	8	44	30	33	Quarter-final		
1973	1st	11	30	9	12	9	33	35	21	Round of 16		
1974	1st	7	30	8	15	7	36	41	31	Round of 16		
1975	1st	14	30	7	10	13	27	42	24	Round of 16		
1976	1st	13	15	4	5	6	14	15	13			
1976	1st	5	15	6	4	5	22	16	16	Round of 16		
1977	1st	10	30	8	12	10	34	33	28	Semi-final		
1978	1st	10	30	9	8	13	31	46	26	Quarter-final		
1979	1st	10	34	11	9	14	41	45	30	Group stage		
1980	1st	3	34	16	10	8	51	42	42	Group stage		
1981	1st	15	34	9	10	15	33	43	28	Round of 16		
1982	1st	7	34	12	9	13	44	41	33	Group stage	UC	First round
1983	1st	4	34	15	11	8	42	32	40	Semi-final		
1984	1st	1	34	19	9	6	60	32	47	Runner-up		
1985	1st	6	34	14	7	13	48	38	35	Semi-final		
1986	1st	4	30	12	9	9	44	36	33	Semi-final	ECC	Second round
1987	1st	14	30	7	10	13	25	37	24	Round of 16		
1988	1st	6	30	11	9	10	35	34	31	Round of 16	UC	First round
1989	1st	16	30	5	9	16	24	48	19	Round of 16		
1990	2nd	18	38	8	14	16	35	41	30	Round of 32	UC	Second round
1991	2nd	18	42	11	14	17	44	50	36	Round of 32		

=== Russian Federation ===
Season	Div.	Pos.	Pld	W	D	L	GF	GA	Pts	Cup	Europe		Top scorer (league)	Head coach
1992	1st	16	30	10	8	12	39	45	28	—	—		(Russia) Kulik – 13	(Russia) Melnikov
1993	2nd	2	38	25	8	5	87	33	58	Round of 32	—		(Russia) Kulik – 36	(Russia) Melnikov
1994	2nd	13	42	14	12	16	44	49	40	Round of 64	—		(Russia) Kulik – 9	(Russia) Melnikov
1995	2nd	3	42	24	5	13	68	42	77	Round of 32	—		(Russia) Kulik – 19	(Russia) Sadyrin
1996	1st	10	34	13	4	17	32	37	43	Round of 32	—		(Russia) Kulik – 11	(Russia) Sadyrin
1997	1st	8	34	13	10	11	28	29	49	Semifinal	—		(Ukraine) Horshkov – 5	(Russia) Byshovets
1998	1st	5	30	12	11	7	42	25	47	Round of 16	—		(Russia) Panov – 8 (Ukraine) Maksymyuk – 8	(Russia) Byshovets (Russia) Davydov
1999	1st	8	30	9	12	9	36	34	39	Winner	—		(Ukraine) Popovych – 7	(Russia) Davydov
2000	1st	7	30	13	8	9	38	26	47	Round of 32	UC; IC	1st round Runner-up	(Ukraine) Popovych – 10	(Russia) Davydov (Russia) Morozov
2001	1st	3	30	16	8	6	52	35	56	Round of 32	—		(Ukraine) Popovych – 7	(Russia) Morozov
2002	1st	10	30	8	9	13	36	42	33	Runner-up	—		(Russia) Kerzhakov – 14	(Russia) Morozov (Russia) Biryukov (Russia) Rappoport
2003	1st	2	30	16	8	6	48	32	56	Round of 16	UC	1st round	(Russia) Kerzhakov – 13	(Czech Republic) Petržela
2004	1st	4	30	17	5	8	55	37	56	Round of 16	—		(Russia) Kerzhakov – 18	(Czech Republic) Petržela
2005	1st	6	30	13	10	7	45	26	49	Semifinals	UC	Group stage	(Russia) Arshavin – 9	(Czech Republic) Petržela
2006	1st	4	30	13	11	6	42	30	50	Semifinals	UC	Quarterfinals	(Russia) Arshavin – 7	(Czech Republic) Petržela (Czech Republic) Borovička (Netherlands) Advocaat
2007	1st	1	30	18	7	5	53	32	61	Quarterfinals	—		(Russia) Pogrebnyak – 11	(Netherlands) Advocaat
2008	1st	5	30	12	12	6	59	37	48	Quarterfinals	UC USC	Winner Winner	(Turkey) Tekke – 8	(Netherlands) Advocaat
2009	1st	3	30	15	9	6	48	27	54	Round of 32	UCL; UC	Group stage Round of 16	(Turkey) Tekke – 8	(Netherlands) Advocaat (Russia) Davydov
2010	1st	1	30	20	8	2	61	21	68	Winner	EL	Play-off round	(Russia) Kerzhakov – 13	(Italy) Spalletti
2011–12	1st	1	44	24	16	4	85	40	88	Quarterfinals	UCL	Round of 16	(Russia) Kerzhakov – 23	(Italy) Spalletti
2012–13	1st	2	30	18	8	4	52	25	62	Semifinals	UCL; EL	Group stage Round of 16	(Russia) Kerzhakov – 10	(Italy) Spalletti
2013–14	1st	2	30	19	6	5	63	32	63	Fifth round	UCL	Round of 16	(Brazil) Hulk – 17	(Italy) Spalletti (Russia) Semak (Portugal) Villas-Boas
2014–15	1st	1	30	20	7	3	58	17	67	Round of 16	UCL; EL	Group stage Quarterfinals	(Brazil) Hulk – 15	(Portugal) Villas-Boas
2015–16	1st	3	30	17	8	5	61	32	59	Winner	UCL	Round of 16	(Brazil) Hulk – 17	(Portugal) Villas-Boas
2016–17	1st	3	30	18	7	5	50	19	61	Round of 16	EL	Round of 32	(Russia) Dzyuba – 13	(Romania) Lucescu
2017–18	1st	5	30	14	11	5	46	21	53	Round of 32	EL	Round of 16	(Russia) Kokorin – 10	(Italy) Mancini
2018–19	1st	1	30	20	4	6	57	29	64	Round of 16	EL	Round of 16	(Argentina) Driussi – 11	(Russia) Semak
2019–20	1st	1	30	22	6	2	65	18	72	Winner	UCL	Group stage	(Iran) Azmoun – 17 (Russia) Dzyuba – 17	(Russia) Semak
2020–21	1st	1	30	19	8	3	76	26	65	Round of 16	UCL	Group stage	(Russia) Dzyuba – 20	(Russia) Semak
2021–22	1st	1	30	19	8	3	66	28	65	Quarter-finals	UCL; EL	Group stage Knockout round	(Russia) Dzyuba – 11	(Russia) Semak
2022–23	1st	1	30	21	7	2	74	20	70	Quarter-finals	Suspended		(Brazil) Malcom – 23	(Russia) Semak
2023–24	1st	1	30	17	6	7	52	27	57	Winner	Suspended		(Colombia) Mateo Cassierra – 21	(Russia) Semak
2024–25	1st	2	30	20	6	4	58	18	66	Round of 16	Suspended		(Argentina) Luciano Gondou – 10	(Russia) Semak
2025–26	1st	1	30	20	8	2	53	19	68	Quarterfinals	Suspended		(Russia) Aleksandr Sobolev – 10	(Russia) Semak

== Players ==
=== Current squad ===
As of 8 September 2026

Note: Flags indicate national team as defined under FIFA eligibility rules; some limited exceptions apply. Players may hold more than one non-FIFA nationality.

No.	Pos.	Nation	Player
3	DF	BRA	Douglas Santos (captain)
5	MF	COL	Wilmar Barrios
7	FW	RUS	Aleksandr Sobolev
8	MF	BRA	Wendel
9	FW	BRA	Felipe Augusto
10	FW	RUS	Maksim Glushenkov
11	FW	BRA	Luiz Henrique
14	MF	BRA	Jhon Jhon
15	DF	RUS	Vyacheslav Karavayev
16	GK	RUS	Denis Adamov
20	FW	BRA	Pedro
21	MF	RUS	Aleksandr Yerokhin
25	DF	COL	Kevin Andrade

No.	Pos.	Nation	Player
28	DF	KAZ	Nuraly Alip
31	DF	BRA	Gustavo Mantuan
33	DF	BRA	Nino
38	MF	RUS	Amir Musayev
51	FW	RUS	Vadim Shilov
57	GK	RUS	Bogdan Moskvichyov
61	MF	RUS	Daniil Kondakov
66	DF	ARG	Román Vega
71	GK	RUS	Daniil Odoyevsky
78	DF	RUS	Igor Diveyev
82	DF	RUS	Sergei Volkov
93	MF	RUS	Artyom Karpukas

=== Players at Zenit-2 ===
Note: Flags indicate national team as defined under FIFA eligibility rules; some limited exceptions apply. Players may hold more than one non-FIFA nationality.

No.	Pos.	Nation	Player
43	DF	RUS	Denis Terentyev
70	DF	RUS	Nikita Vershinin
75	DF	RUS	Bogdan Levandovsky

No.	Pos.	Nation	Player
86	FW	RUS	Dmitry Barkov
91	FW	RUS	Kirill Kosarev

=== Out on loan ===
Note: Flags indicate national team as defined under FIFA eligibility rules; some limited exceptions apply. Players may hold more than one non-FIFA nationality.

No.	Pos.	Nation	Player
—	GK	RUS	Aleksandr Dyogtev (at Orenburg until 30 June 2027)
—	GK	RUS	Nikita Goylo (at Vitebsk until 31 December 2026)
—	DF	RUS	Matvey Bardachyov (at Fakel Voronezh until 30 June 2027)
—	DF	SLO	Vanja Drkušić (at Espanyol until 30 June 2027)
—	DF	BRA	Robert Renan (at Vasco da Gama until 31 December 2026)

No.	Pos.	Nation	Player
—	DF	SRB	Strahinja Eraković (at Samsunspor until 30 June 2027)
—	MF	RUS	Andrei Mostovoy (at Lokomotiv Moscow until 30 June 2027)
—	MF	BRA	Du Queiroz (at Sabah until 30 June 2027)
—	FW	RUS	Andrey Kasadzhikov (at Orenburg until 30 June 2027)

=== Reserve squad ===
Zenit's reserve squad played professionally as Zenit-2 (Russian Second League in 1993, Russian Second Division from 1998 to 2000) and Zenit-d (Russian Third League from 1994 to 1997). Another team that was founded as Lokomotiv-Zenit-2 played as Zenit-2 in the Russian Second Division from 2001 to 2008. By 2008, there was no relation between that team and FC Zenit. Another farm club called FC Smena-Zenit debuted in the Russian Second Division in 2009, taking the spot of the former FC Zenit-2. FC Smena-Zenit was dissolved after the 2009 season because it did not fulfill Zenit's initial expectations. Zenit-2 reentered professional football in the 2013–14 season in the Russian Professional Football League.

=== Team captains ===
Name	Years
(Russia) Aleksey Naumov	1992
(Russia) Oleg Dmitriyev	1993–94
(Russia) Vladimir Kulik	1995–96
(Ukraine) Yuriy Vernydub	1997–2000
(Russia) Andrey Kobelev	2000–01
(Russia) Aleksei Igonin	2002–03
(Russia) Vladislav Radimov	2003–07
(Russia) Andrey Arshavin	2007
(Norway) Erik Hagen	2007
(Ukraine) Anatoliy Tymoshchuk	2007–09
(Russia) Aleksandr Anyukov	2009–12, 2018–19
(Russia) Vyacheslav Malafeev	2012
(Russia) Roman Shirokov	2013
(Russia) Konstantin Zyryanov	2013–14
(Portugal) Danny	2014–17
(Italy) Domenico Criscito	2017–18
(Serbia) Branislav Ivanović	2019–20
(Russia) Artem Dzyuba	2020
(Croatia) Dejan Lovren	2020–22
(Brazil) Douglas Santos	2023–

== Club officials ==
=== Board of directors ===
Position	Name
Chair of the board of directors	(Russia) Elena Ilyukhina
Chairman of the board	(Russia) Konstantin Zyryanov
Advisor to the chairman of the board	(Russia) Alexander Medvedev (Russia) Mikhail Biryukov (France) Damien Le Tallec
Executive director	(Russia) Maksim Pogorelov
Deputy general director for sports development	(Russia) Andrey Arshavin
Deputy director general for security and information protection	(Russia) Aleksandr Vasilyev
Deputy general director for infrastructure	(Russia) Vladimir Litvinov
Deputy general director for public relations	(Russia) Zhanna Dembo
Director of the legal department	(Russia) Oleg Zadubrovsky
Head of the commercial department	(Russia) Alexey Pak
Director of FC Zenit academy	(Russia) Anatoli Davydov

Source: fc-zenit.ru

In July 2023, by decision of the board of directors, a new executive body, the board, was created at Zenit. The purpose of creating a new structure is to streamline the decision-making process and increase the planning horizon. The board included CEO Konstantin Zyryanov as chairman, his deputies and heads of departments Andrey Arshavin, Alexander Vasilyev, Zhanna Dembo, Oleg Zadubrovsky, Vladimir Litvinov, Alexey Pak, Maxim Pogorelov, head coach Sergey Semak.

=== Management ===
Position	Name
Head coach	(Russia) Sergey Semak
Assistant coach	(Brazil) William (Russia) Igor Simutenkov (Ukraine) Anatoliy Tymoshchuk (Russia) Aleksandr Anyukov
Goalkeeping coach	(Russia) Mikhail Biryukov (Russia) Mikhail Kerzhakov (Russia) Yuriy Okroshidze
Fitness coach	(Italy) Ivan Carminati (Croatia) Aris Naglić (Spain) Toni Tapia (Russia) Kirill Kostin (Spain) Alberto Navarro
Head of video analysis	(Russia) Alexander Popovich
Analysis specialist	(Russia) Egor Romanov (Russia) Nikita Mikhailov (Russia) Vasili Galanin
Chief doctor	(Russia) Mikhail Grishin
Team doctor	(Russia) Vladimir Hightin
Doctor and therapist	(Russia) Pavel Skorik
Masseuse	(Russia) Alexander Ryzantsev (Russia) Konstantin Evlanov (Russia) Mikhail Murashkintsev
Medical services manager	(Russia) Vladislav Zhilinsky
Doctor of medical rehabilitation	(Russia) Alexi Mikhailov
Team manager	(Russia) Ilia Gorbachev
Administrator	(Russia) Alexi Frolov (Russia) Dmitriy Puchkov

Source: https://fc-zenit.ru/zenit/coaches/

== Sponsors ==
Period	Brand	Sponsor
1977–2000	(Germany) Adidas	Ocrim, Corporation XX Trest; Saint Petersburg City Administration, LOMO, Marcopizzi Calzature, Adidas, Baltika, Gazprom Lentransgaz, Gazprom Gazenergofinance
2001–2002	(Italy) Diadora	Gazprom
2003–2004	(United Kingdom) Umbro	Gazprom
2005–2007	(Germany) Adidas	Gazprom
2008–2009	(Germany) Puma	Gazprom
2010–2022	(United States) Nike	Gazprom
2023–2024	(Spain) Joma	Gazprom, Wildberries
2024–2025	(Spain) Kelme	Gazprom, Wildberries
2025–	(Russia) Jögel	Gazprom, Wildberries

== Partnership ==
=== Other football clubs ===
- (Serbia) Red Star Belgrade
- (Iran) Sepahan

=== Corporations ===
- (Russia) Winline
- (Russia) MegaFon
- (Russia) The Aeroflot Group
- (Russia) FUN&SUN
- (Russia) LADA
- (Russia) Rostelecom
- (Russia) Weissgauff
- (Russia) Kinopoisk
- (Russia) Astra Group
- (Russia) Yandex Plus
- (Russia) Icecream Chistaya Liniya
- (Russia) Bookmaker Ratings
- (Russia) Nonton
- (Russia) Vedomosti Sport
- (Russia) Sovetsky Sport
- (Russia) Metaratings
- (Russia) Jögel
- (Russia) Yandex Smena
- (Russia) Спорт День за Днем
- (Russia) The Galleria Shopping Centre
- (Russia) Юрент
- (Russia) Baltika
- (Russia) Яндекс Go Заряд
- (Russia) AUVIX
- (Russia) Northern Telecom
- (Russia) Solar

== Presidents ==
Name	Period
(Russia) Vladislav Gusev	1990–1992
(Russia) Leonid Tufrin	1992–1994
(Russia) Vitaly Mutko	1995–2003
(Russia) David Traktovenko	2003–2005
(Russia) Sergey Fursenko	2006–2008
(Russia) Alexander Dyukov	2008–2017
(Russia) Sergey Fursenko	2017–2019
(Russia) Alexander Medvedev	2019–2025
(Russia) Konstantin Zyryanov	2025–

== Head coaches ==
Name	Period
(Soviet Union) Pyotr Filippov	1936–37
(Soviet Union) Mikhail Yudenich	1938–39
(Soviet Union) Konstantin Egorov	1938–39
(Soviet Union) Pyotr Filippov	1940
(Soviet Union) Konstantin Lemeshev	1941–45
(Soviet Union) Mikhail Butusov	1946
(Soviet Union) Ivan Talanov	1946–48
(Soviet Union) Konstantin Lemeshev	1948–50
(Soviet Union) Georgiy Lasin	1950–51
(Soviet Union) Vladimir Lemeshev	1952–54
(Soviet Union) Nikolay Lyukshinov	1954–55
(Soviet Union) Arkadiy Alov	1956–57
(Soviet Union) Georgiy Zharkov	1957–60
(Soviet Union) Gennadiy Bondarenko	1960
(Soviet Union) Evgeniy Eliseev	1961–64
(Soviet Union) Valentin Fyodorov	1964–66
(Soviet Union) Arkadiy Alov	1967
(Soviet Union) Artem Falyan	1968–70
(Soviet Union) Yevgeniy Goryanskiy	1970–72
(Soviet Union) German Zonin	1973–77
(Soviet Union) Yuri Morozov	1977–82
(Soviet Union) Pavel Sadyrin	1983-87

Name	Period
(Soviet Union) Vladimir Golubev	1987
(Soviet Union) Stanislav Zavidonov	1988–89
(Soviet Union) Vladimir Golubev	1989
(Soviet Union) Anatoliy Konkov	1990
(Soviet Union) Vyacheslav Bulavin	1990
(Russia) Yuri Morozov	1991
(Russia) Vyacheslav Melnikov	1992–94
(Russia) Pavel Sadyrin	Jan 1, 1995 – Dec 31, 1996
(Russia) Anatoliy Byshovets	Jan 1, 1997 – Sep 25, 1998
(Russia) Anatoli Davydov	1998–00
(Russia) Yuri Morozov	2000–02
(Russia) Mikhail Biryukov	2002
(Russia) Boris Rappoport	2002
(Czech Republic) Vlastimil Petržela	Nov 19, 2002 – May 3, 2006
(Czech Republic) Vladimír Borovička (caretaker)	2006
(Netherlands) Dick Advocaat	July 13, 2006 – Aug 10, 2009
(Russia) Anatoli Davydov	Aug 10, 2009 – Dec 9, 2009
(Italy) Luciano Spalletti	Dec 10, 2009 – March 11, 2014
(Russia) Sergei Semak (caretaker)	March 11, 2014 – March 20, 2014
(Portugal) André Villas-Boas	March 20, 2014 – May 24, 2016
(Romania) Mircea Lucescu	May 24, 2016 – May 28, 2017
(Italy) Roberto Mancini	June 1, 2017 – May 13, 2018
(Russia) Sergei Semak	May 29, 2018 – present

== Zenit in European football ==
Competition	Pld	W	D	L	GF	GA	GD	Win% (Note: Win% is rounded to two decimal places)
Champions League / European Cup	76	30	15	31	98	96	+2	39.47
Europa League / UEFA Cup / Inter-Cities Fairs Cup	118	60	21	37	208	143	+65	50.85
Super Cup	1	1	0	0	2	1	+1	100.00
Intertoto Cup	8	6	1	1	17	7	+10	75.00
Total	203	97	37	69	326	246	+80	47.78

== Notable players ==
Had international caps for their respective countries. Players whose name is listed in bold represented their countries while playing for Zenit.

USSR/Russia

- (Soviet Union) **Mikhail Biryukov**
- (Soviet Union) **Vasily Danilov**
- (Soviet Union) **Sergey Dmitriyev**
- (Soviet Union) **Vladimir Golubev**
- (Soviet Union) **Aleksandr Ivanov**
- (Soviet Union) **Leonid Ivanov**
- (Soviet Union) Anzor Kavazashvili
- (Soviet Union) **Vladimir Kazachyonok**
- (Soviet Union) **Nikolay Larionov**
- (Soviet Union) **Fridrikh Maryutin**
- (Soviet Union) Sergei Salnikov
- (Soviet Union) **Sergei Shvetsov**
- (Soviet Union) **Yuriy Voynov**
- (Soviet Union) **Anatoli Zinchenko**
- (Russia) Arsen Adamov
- (Russia) **Denis Adamov**
- (Russia) Ilzat Akhmetov
- (Russia) **Aleksandr Anyukov**
- (Russia) **Andrey Arshavin**
- (Russia) **Zelimkhan Bakayev**
- (Russia) **Aleksandr Bukharov**
- (Russia) **Vladimir Bystrov**
- (Russia) **Dmitri Chistyakov**
- (Russia) **Maksim Demenko**
- (Russia) **Igor Denisov**
- (Russia) **Igor Diveyev**
- (Russia) **Artyom Dzyuba**
- (Russia) **Viktor Fayzulin**
- (Russia) (Brazil) Mário Fernandes
- (Russia) **Maksim Glushenkov**
- (Russia) **Yuri Gorshkov**
- (Russia) **Aleksei Igonin**
- (Russia) **Aleksei Ionov**
- (Russia) Maksim Kanunnikov
- (Russia) **Vyacheslav Karavayev**
- (Russia) Artyom Karpukas
- (Russia) **Aleksandr Kerzhakov**
- (Russia) Andrey Kobelev
- (Russia) **Aleksandr Kokorin**
- (Russia) Sergei Kolotovkin
- (Russia) **Andrei Kondrashov**
- (Russia) Aleksandr Kovalenko
- (Russia) Stanislav Kritsyuk
- (Russia) **Danil Krugovoy**
- (Russia) (Commonwealth of Independent States) (Soviet Union) Vasili Kulkov
- (Russia) **Daler Kuzyayev**
- (Russia) **Yevgeni Latyshonok**
- (Russia) Vladimir Lebed
- (Russia) **Yury Lodygin**
- (Russia) **Andrey Lunyov**
- (Russia) Ilya Maksimov
- (Russia) **Vyacheslav Malafeev**
- (Russia) **Pavel Mogilevets**
- (Russia) **Andrei Mostovoy**
- (Russia) Elmir Nabiullin
- (Russia) **Ivan Novoseltsev**
- (Russia) **Magomed Ozdoyev**
- (Russia) **Aleksandr Panov**
- (Russia) Sergei Petrov
- (Russia) Sergei Podpaly
- (Russia) **Pavel Pogrebnyak**
- (Russia) **Dmitry Poloz**
- (Russia) (Soviet Union) **Dmitri Radchenko**
- (Russia) **Vladislav Radimov**
- (Russia) **Aleksandr Ryazantsev**
- (Russia) (Ukraine) Oleg Salenko
- (Russia) Sergey Semak
- (Russia) **Igor Semshov**
- (Russia) **Ivan Sergeyev**
- (Russia) **Oleg Shatov**
- (Russia) **Roman Shirokov**
- (Russia) **Igor Smolnikov**
- (Russia) **Aleksandr Sobolev**
- (Russia) **Aleksei Sutormin**
- (Russia) Sergei Volkov
- (Russia) **Renat Yanbayev**
- (Russia) **Aleksandr Yerokhin**
- (Russia) **Artur Yusupov**
- (Russia) **Anton Zabolotny**
- (Russia) **Yuri Zhirkov**
- (Russia) Denis Zubko
- (Russia) **Konstantin Zyryanov**

Europe

- (Armenia) **Roman Berezovsky**
- (Armenia) **Sargis Hovsepyan**
- (Armenia) **Yervand Krbachyan**
- (Armenia) **Artem Simonyan**
- (Azerbaijan) Ramil Sheydayev
- (Belarus) **Sergey Gerasimets**
- (Belarus) **Boris Gorovoy**
- (Belarus) Kirill Kaplenko
- (Belarus) **Sergey Kornilenko**
- (Belarus) **Dmitry Ogorodnik**
- (Belarus) **Yuri Zhevnov**
- (Belgium) **Nicolas Lombaerts**
- (Belgium) **Axel Witsel**
- (Bosnia and Herzegovina) Darko Maletić
- (Croatia) **Ivica Križanac**
- (Croatia) **Dejan Lovren**
- (Czech Republic) Marek Kincl
- (Czech Republic) **Pavel Mareš**
- (Czech Republic) **Radek Šírl**
- (Denmark) **Michael Lumb**
- (Georgia (country)) Saba Sazonov
- (Hungary) **Szabolcs Huszti**
- (Italy) **Domenico Criscito**
- (Italy) Claudio Marchisio
- (Italy) Alessandro Rosina
- (Kazakhstan) **Nuraly Alip**
- (Kazakhstan) Andrei Kurdyumov
- (Kazakhstan) **Yevgeni Tarasov**
- (Lithuania) Egidijus Majus
- (Lithuania) Darius Miceika
- (Lithuania) **Robertas Poškus**
- (Lithuania) **Irmantas Stumbrys**
- (Luxembourg) Mikhail Zaritskiy
- (North Macedonia) **Dragan Čadikovski**
- (North Macedonia) **Veliče Šumulikoski**
- (Moldova) **Serghei Cleșcenco**
- (Moldova) **Alexandru Curteian**
- (Montenegro) **Luka Đorđević**
- (Norway) **Erik Hagen**
- (Portugal) **Bruno Alves**
- (Portugal) **Danny**
- (Portugal) Fernando Meira
- (Portugal) **Luís Neto**
- (Romania) Zeno Bundea
- (Romania) Daniel Chiriță
- (Serbia and Montenegro) Mateja Kežman
- (Serbia) **Strahinja Eraković**
- (Serbia) (Serbia and Montenegro) **Branislav Ivanović**
- (Serbia) (Serbia and Montenegro) **Danko Lazović**
- (Serbia) (Serbia and Montenegro) **Aleksandar Luković**
- (Serbia) **Ognjen Mimović**
- (Serbia) Milan Rodić
- (Serbia) Saša Zdjelar
- (Slovakia) **Kamil Čontofalský**
- (Slovakia) **Tomáš Hubočan**
- (Slovakia) **Róbert Mak**
- (Slovakia) **Martin Škrtel**
- (Slovenia) **Vanja Drkušić**
- (Slovenia) **Miha Mevlja**
- (Spain) Javi García
- (Turkey) **Fatih Tekke**
- (Ukraine) Vladimir Gorily
- (Ukraine) (Russia) **Olexandr Gorshkov**
- (Ukraine) **Roman Maksimyuk**
- (Ukraine) **Sergey Popov**
- (Ukraine) Yaroslav Rakitskiy
- (Ukraine) **Oleksandr Spivak**
- (Ukraine) Oleksandr Svystunov
- (Ukraine) **Anatoliy Tymoschuk**
- (Ukraine) Igor Zhabchenko

North America

- (Haiti) Wilson Isidor

South America

- (Argentina) Cristian Ansaldi
- (Argentina) **Ezequiel Garay**
- (Argentina) **Matías Kranevitter**
- (Argentina) Emanuel Mammana
- (Argentina) **Leandro Paredes**
- (Argentina) **Emiliano Rigoni**
- (Argentina) **Román Vega**
- (Brazil) Yuri Alberto
- (Brazil) Gerson
- (Brazil) **Giuliano**
- (Brazil) **Luiz Henrique**
- (Brazil) **Hulk**
- (Brazil) **Malcom**
- (Brazil) Nino
- (Brazil) **Douglas Santos**
- (Colombia) **Kevin Andrade**
- (Colombia) **Wílmar Barrios**
- (Colombia) **Mateo Cassierra**
- (Colombia) Jhon Durán
- (Ecuador) **Christian Noboa**
- (Venezuela) **Yordan Osorio**
- (Venezuela) **Salomón Rondón**

Asia

- (Iran) **Sardar Azmoun**
- (South Korea) **Kim Dong-jin**
- (South Korea) **Lee Ho**
- (South Korea) Hyun Young-min
- (Tajikistan) **Andrei Manannikov**
- (Tajikistan) **Vazgen Manasyan**
- (Turkmenistan) (Soviet Union) Valeri Broshin
- (Turkmenistan) Dmitri Khomukha
- (Turkmenistan) Dmitri Nezhelev

== Rivalries ==
Zenit's traditional rivals are the big Moscow clubs, most notably FC Spartak Moscow, CSKA Moscow, FC Dynamo Moscow and FC Torpedo Moscow. They also shared rivalries with the big Ukrainian clubs FC Dynamo Kyiv and FC Shakhtar Donetsk in the Soviet era.

== See also ==
- ZFK Zenit Saint Petersburg
