= FC Dynamo Saint Petersburg =

Russian association football club

Dynamo St. Petersburg
- Full name: Football Club Dynamo Saint Petersburg
- Nickname: The Blues
- Founded: 1922
- Ground: Nova Arena, Saint Petersburg
- Capacity: 995
- Owner: Konstantin Samsonov
- Chairman: Konstantin Samsonov (President)
- Manager: Sergey Ryzhikov
- League: Russian Second League, Division B, Group 2
- 2026: 2nd
- Website: fcdynamospb.ru
| Home colours | Away colours |

Old logo from 2001 to 2021

FC Dynamo Saint Petersburg is a Russian football club from Saint Petersburg, in Northwest Russia. Founded in 1922, the club was one of the oldest in the city. It plays in the fourth-tier Russian Second League Division B.

They were a regular in the Soviet Top League until relegation in 1963. After the dissolution of the Soviet Union, their highest status was in the second-level Russian National Football League for several seasons, and the fifth place in the league is their greatest achievement.

In July 2015, the club was purchased by Boris Rotenberg. In June 2018, the team moved to Sochi, becoming PFC Sochi; In Saint Petersburg there remained Dynamo youth team. In 2019, Dynamo was reestablished by Clubs' Veterans on the resources of FC LAZ Luga. From August 2021 to 2023, Chinese trucks manufacturer SAIC Iveco Hongyan was the main sponsor. Since 2023, SETL Group company are the Clubs’ sponsor.

== History ==
=== The glorious past ===
The club was founded in 1922 as part of the All-Union Sport Society "Dinamo" that had clubs in a variety of sports throughout the Soviet Union. The society was the main sponsor of the club. Dinamo debuted in the Soviet Top League in 1936 among the original seven teams in the first edition of the Soviet Top League. The club reentered the Soviet Top League following the end of World War II as the member of the interrupted edition of 1941. The club then participated in the Top League between 1936 and 1954, finishing in the top five, three times. In 1954, its record was cause to replace Dynamo with TRL after the team's tenth-place finish in the League. From 1955 to 1961, they had only Jewish striker, Israel "Zolik" Olshanetsky.

=== A resurrection ===
The club was resurrected in 1960 in the place of TRL and spent the next two seasons in "the second tier (Class B) of the Soviet league, before making it back to the Top Division.

=== Loss of professional status ===
Dynamo lost its professional status in 2000 with the lack of financing; a local building society stepped in. Professional status was lost in 2004.

=== FC Petrotrest Saint Petersburg ===
FC Petrotrest Saint Petersburg
- Full name: Football Club Petrotrest Saint Petersburg
- Founded: 2001; 25 years ago
- Dissolved: 2013; 13 years ago
| Home colours | Away colours |

FC Petrotrest Saint Petersburg (Russian: ФК "Петротрест" Санкт-Петербург) was a former association football club from Saint Petersburg, Russia, founded in 2001. In 2002 the team played in Amateur Football League (North-West zone), in 2003, 2004, 2006 and since 2011 - in Second Division (West zone), in 2005 - in First Division (was relegated).

From 2007 to 2010 the team played under the name of FC Dynamo Saint Petersburg. After the team was relegated to the Russian Second Division after the 2010 season, the team returned to their previous name FC Petrotrest and another independent team called FC Dynamo was organized to play in the Amateur Football League. In 2012 the club was finished in the 1st place and was promoted to the First division. In 2013 it was merged back into Dynamo Saint Petersburg.

=== The United FC Dynamo Saint Petersburg ===
In preparations to 2013–14 season, FC Petrotrest and Dynamo signed on an agreement of merging FC Petrotrest into Dynamo in order to play in the Russian First Division, now called the National Football League.

At the end of the 2014–15 season, the club was relegated to the third level league, the Russian Professional Football League. Following the season, the club was purchased by the billionaire Boris Rotenberg (technically, a new club called FC Dynamo-Saint Petersburg was formed, with SMP Racing becoming the new sponsor) and at the end of June 2015 "Dynamo" has with the new founders and sponsors were allowed to participate in the Second Division.

The first season of the renewed team was not easy - meeting in full strength only a few days before the start of the Championship, Dynamo failed to show good performances in the first round, once in the basement of the standings at the end of the first part of the season. But in spring 2016, thanks to high-quality training in the winter and breeding spot, Dynamo straighten their figures, nearly becoming the best team in the "West" zone on the results of matches of the second stage of the Championship. in November 2016 The team finish in the 1st place in the table standing of Western Zone in the 2nd Division. They secured the top spot in their PFL zone and promotion back to the Russian National Football League on 21 May 2017.

=== Since 2019 ===
Dynamo Saint Petersburg was re-established on the base of another Saint Petersburg club, this time it was FC LAZ Luga in 2019, and they won the Champions Cup of North-West Championship.

In May 2020, it was reported that the club will be reorganize as a private football club to compete in the Russian Professional Football League during 2020–21 season. Former Zenit's goalkeeper, Vyacheslav Malafeev, was attached to manage the club.

Dynamo reentered PFL (which was renamed to FNL 2) for the 2021–22 season. In August 2021, a Chinese company SAIC Iveco Hongyan has become the main sponsor.

In 2023 the club has introduced a new sponsors: SETL Group. They started to compete in the FNL 2 and signed a new players, such as Aleksey Kazarinov, Mikhail Chernomyrdin and Aleksandr Sapeta.

== Current squad ==
As of 11 September 2026, according to the Second League website.

Note: Flags indicate national team as defined under FIFA eligibility rules; some limited exceptions apply. Players may hold more than one non-FIFA nationality.

| No. | Pos. | Nation | Player |
|---|---|---|---|
| 5 | DF | RUS | Maksim Polkovnikov |
| 7 | MF | RUS | Danila Smirnov |
| 9 | MF | RUS | Dmitry Shilov |
| 10 | FW | RUS | Danila Yezhkov |
| 11 | FW | AZE | Rizvan Umarov |
| 13 | MF | RUS | Ilya Kubyshkin |
| 15 | DF | UKR | Oleksandr Masalov |
| 18 | FW | RUS | Omar Popov |
| 19 | MF | RUS | Pavel Kireyenko |
| 20 | FW | RUS | Mikhail Yakovlev |
| 21 | MF | RUS | Artyom Ziyaisov (on loan from Rubin-2 Kazan) |
| 23 | MF | RUS | Dmitry Borodin |
| 24 | MF | RUS | Andrey Orlov |
| 25 | DF | RUS | Stepan Vavilov |
| 27 | MF | RUS | Vladislav Prudnikov |
| 28 | DF | RUS | Mikhail Mansurov |
| 31 | GK | RUS | Artyom Meshalkin |

| No. | Pos. | Nation | Player |
|---|---|---|---|
| 32 | GK | RUS | Ivan Pavlov |
| 37 | FW | RUS | Ilya Vorotnikov |
| 39 | DF | RUS | Pavel Gorbachyov |
| 41 | DF | RUS | Dmitry Kuroshev |
| 44 | DF | RUS | Vyacheslav Dyomin |
| 47 | MF | RUS | Oleg Talygin |
| 52 | MF | RUS | Vitaly Khabarov |
| 55 | MF | RUS | Vladislav Shepelev |
| 66 | FW | RUS | Aleksandr Smaglyuk |
| 72 | FW | RUS | Mikhail Baryshnikov |
| 77 | DF | RUS | Artur Koshman |
| 80 | MF | RUS | Ilya Morozov |
| 86 | GK | RUS | Nikolay Rybikov |
| 88 | MF | RUS | Roman Torosyan |
| 95 | GK | RUS | Georgy Korolyov |
| 99 | FW | RUS | Nikita Khlusov |

== Team name history ==
- Dynamo Leningrad (1936–1990)
- FC Prometey-Dynamo St. Petersburg (1991–1995)
- FC Dynamo St. Petersburg (1995–1999)
- FC Dynamo-Stroyimpuls St. Petersburg (2000)
- FC Dynamo-SPb St. Petersburg (2001–2003)
- FC Dynamo St. Petersburg (2007–2010)
- FC Dynamo Saint Petersburg (2011)
- FC Dynamo St. Petersburg (2013–2018, 2019–)

== Home stadium ==
=== Dynamo Stadium ===
In 1929, Dinamo gained its own stadium, Dinamo.

The Dynamo Stadium was built and designed by the architects O. Lyalin and Y. Svirskiy. The stadium was located on Krestovsky Island in Leningrad and was the home stadium for Dynamo F.C., the stadium had a capacity of 500 fans.

On May 22, 1936, the stadium hosted 12,000 fans in the first ever game of the Soviet Championship. The game was between Dynamo Leningrad and Lokomotiv Moscow and finished with Lokomotiv winning 1:3. During the Siege of Leningrad, On May 31, 1942, the stadium host The Siege Game, between Dynamo Leningrad and the local football clubs.

Nowadays, the stadium is used as a training compound for Dynamo. In 2007 the Saint Petersburg City Administration announced a project to destroy the stadium and replace it with a housing building and a business center. In 2009 the compound become a full municipal property after the City Administration purchased the ground from Dynamo's owners.

=== Petrovsky Stadium ===
Since the end of the 2000s, Dinamo plays at Sport Complex Petrovsky in Saint Petersburg. The complex consists of two arenas (stadiums): the central sport arena (CSA) and the minor sport arena (MSA). Dinamo shares the complex with four other professional teams. In 2008 Zenit plays at CSA, the MSA is used by Dinamo, Zenit-2, Zenit-D, and Sever (Murmansk). The MSA provides 2,835 seats to its spectators. There are talks that Zenit will move out of this complex to its new stadium that will be built in 2009 in place of the Kirov Stadium. This migration might provide Dinamo with full exploitation of the whole complex.

== League and cup history ==
=== Soviet Union ===
| Season | Division (Name) | Pos./Teams | Pl. | W | D | L | GS | GA | P | Domestic Cup | Europe | Notes |
|---|---|---|---|---|---|---|---|---|---|---|---|---|
| 1936 (Spring) | 1st (Group A) | 6/(7) | 6 | 1 | 1 | 4 | 5 | 12 | 9 | | | 3 pts for win, 2 - draw, 1 – lost |
| 1936 (Autumn) | 1st (Group A) | 7/(8) | 7 | 1 | 3 | 3 | 7 | 15 | 12 | ¼ finals | | 3 pts for win, 2 - draw, 1 – lost |
| 1937 | 1st (Group A) | 7/(9) | 16 | 2 | 9 | 5 | 21 | 25 | 29 | 1/16 | | 3 pts for win, 2 - draw, 1 – lost |
| 1938 | 1st (Group A) | 7/(26) | 25 | 12 | 6 | 7 | 52 | 32 | 30 | 1/2 | | shifted to the two point system |
| 1939 | 1st (Group A) | 10/(14) | 26 | 8 | 6 | 12 | 41 | 56 | 22 | 1/16 | | |
| 1940 | 1st (Group A) | 5/(13) | 24 | 11 | 5 | 8 | 47 | 44 | 21 | No competition | | |
| 1941 | 1st (Group A) | 2/(15) | 10 | 5 | 4 | 1 | 18 | 8 | 14 | No competition | | Unofficial (did not finish due to World War II) |
| 1942 | | | | | | | | | | | | Was not played due to World War II |
| 1943 | | | | | | | | | | | | Was not played due to World War II |
| 1944 | | | | | | | | | | 1/4 | | Was not played due to World War II |
| 1945 | 1st (1st Group) | 5/(12) | 22 | 11 | 3 | 8 | 42 | 29 | 25 | 1/4 | | |
| 1946 | 1st (1st Group) | 5/(12) | 22 | 10 | 4 | 8 | 37 | 35 | 24 | 1/8 | | |
| 1947 | 1st (1st Group) | 10/(13) | 24 | 7 | 5 | 12 | 32 | 48 | 19 | 1/2 | | |
| 1948 | 1st (1st Group) | 6/(14) | 26 | 10 | 5 | 11 | 42 | 47 | 25 | 1/8 | | |
| 1949 | 1st (1st Group) | 9/(18) | 34 | 12 | 10 | 12 | 53 | 53 | 34 | 1/16 | | |
| 1950 | 1st (Class A) | 8/(19) | 36 | 14 | 10 | 12 | 63 | 50 | 38 | 1/16 | | |
| 1951 | 1st (Class A) | 9/(15) | 28 | 11 | 5 | 12 | 46 | 53 | 27 | 1/16 | | |
| 1952 | 1st (Class A) | 5/(14) | 13 | 5 | 5 | 3 | 17 | 17 | 15 | 1/2 | | |
| 1953 | 1st (Class A) | 10/(11) | 20 | 5 | 4 | 11 | 20 | 33 | 14 | 1/8 | | |
| 1954 | 1st (Class A) | 4/(13) | 24 | 8 | 10 | 6 | 29 | 25 | 26 | ? | | as TRL |
| 1955 | 1st (Class A) | 10/(12) | 22 | 5 | 6 | 11 | 28 | 41 | 16 | ? | | as TRL |
| 1956 | 1st (Class A) | 12/(12) | 22 | 3 | 7 | 12 | 25 | 47 | 13 | ? | | as TRL relegated |
| 1957 | 2nd | | | | | | | | | ? | | as TRL |
| 1958 | 2nd | | | | | | | | | ? | | as TRL |
| 1959 | 2nd | | | | | | | | | ? | | as TRL |
| 1960 | 2nd (II Zone) | 9 | 28 | 9 | 6 | 13 | 46 | 43 | 24 | ? | | reestablished in place of TRL |
| 1961 | 2nd (II Zone) | 3 | 30 | 18 | 9 | 3 | 58 | 28 | 45 | 1/128 | | Promoted |
| 1962 | 1st (Class A) | 16 | 30 | 8 | 6 | 16 | 27 | 49 | 22 | 1/16 | | replaced the disbanded FC Admiralteets Leningrad |
| 1963 | 1st (Class A) | 16 | 38 | 7 | 15 | 16 | 37 | 51 | 29 | 1/4 | | relegated |

=== Russia ===
| Year | Competition | Position | Cup | Head Coach | Notes |
|---|---|---|---|---|---|
| 1992 | First League, Western Zone | 17 | | Vladimir Pronin, Vladimir Goncharov | relegated to the Second Division. |
| 1993 | Second Division, 5th Zone | 10 | | Vladimir Goncharov | relegated to the Third Division. |
| 1994 | Third Division, 4th Zone | 6 | | Aleksandr Fyodorov | |
| 1995 | Third Division, 4th Zone | 2 | | Aleksandr Fyodorov | promoted to Second Division |
| 1996 | Second Division, Western Zone | 20 | | Aleksandr Fyodorov | transferred to Central Zone |
| 1997 | Second Division, Central Zone | 18 | | Mark Rubin | returned to Western Zone |
| 1998 | Second Division, Western Zone | 8 | | Boris Rappoport | |
| 1999 | Second Division, Western Zone | 13 | | Boris Rappoport | lost status as Professional Club and relegated to the Amateur League |
| 2000 | Amateur League, North-West Football Championship | 2 | | Sergey Gerasimets, Sergey Lomakin | promoted to Second Division, after winning the Cup of Russian Amateur League. |
| 2001 | Russian Professional Football League, Western Zone | 1 | | Sergey Lomakin, Sergey Vedeneyev | promoted to First Division |
| 2002 | 1st Division | 16(4) | | Sergey Lomakin, Dmitry Galyamin, Valery Gladilin | |
| 2003 | 1st Division | 5 | 1/8 | Oleg Dolmatov, Vladimir Kazachyonok | Dynamo has been demolished due to financial problems |
| 2007 | 2nd Division, Western Zone | 3 | | Sergey Dmitriev, Yuri Zheludkov, Leonid Tkachenko | |
| 2008 | 2nd Division, Western Zone | 7 | | Leonid Tkachenko, Vyacheslav Melnikov, Eduard Malofeyev | |
| 2009 | 2nd Division, Western Zone | 1 | | Eduard Malofeyev | promoted to First Division |
| 2010 | First Division | 16 | | Alexander Averyanov, Grigori Mikhalyuk, Boris Zhuravlyov, Eduard Malofeyev, Sergey Frantsev, Igor Zazulin | relegated to Russian Amateur Football League |
| 2011 | Amateur League, North-West Football Championship | ? | | FC Dynamo dissolved due to bankrupt announcement of the club's sponsor. | |
| 2012/13 | First Division | 17 | | Pavel Gusev | promoted to Russian National Football League, due to union agreement with FC Petrotrest. |
| 2013/14 | First Division | 14 | | Pavel Gusev | |
| 2014/15 | First Division | 18 | | Adyam Kuzyayev | FC Dynamo dissolved due to bankrupt announcement of the club's sponsor, but before the next season start was reestablish. |
| 2015/16 | 2nd Division, Western Zone | 7 | | Aleksandr Tochilin | |
| 2016/17 | 2nd Division, Western Zone | 1 | | Aleksandr Tochilin | Promoted to Russian National Football League. |
| 2017/18 | 1st Division | 6 | 1/8 | Aleksandr Tochilin | |
| 2018/19 | Dissolved | | | | |
| 2019/20 | Amateur League, North-West Football Championship | 2 | Won the Saint Petersburg cup and North-West Football Championship cup | Yuri Solntsev | |
| 2020/21 | Amateur League, North-West Football Championship | | | Sergei Poltavets | |

== Farm club ==
Following Dynamo's promotion to the Russian National Football League at the end of the 2016–17 season, the club organized a farm-club FC Dynamo-2 Saint Petersburg and entered it into the Russian Professional Football League.

== Notable players ==
These are players who won international caps for their respective countries. Players whose name is listed in bold represented their countries while playing for Dynamo.

USSR/Russia

- (Soviet Union) Sergey Dmitriev
- (Soviet Union) **Pyotr Dementyev**
- (Soviet Union) Alexander Kanishchev
- (Soviet Union) Aleksandr Khapsalis
- (Soviet Union) Nikolay Larionov
- (Soviet Union) Fridrikh Maryutin
- (Soviet Union) / (Russia) Dmitri Radchenko
- (Soviet Union) Aleksandr Tenyagin
- (Soviet Union) Gennady Yevriuzhikin
- (Soviet Union) Anatoli Zinchenko
- (Russia) Ilshat Faizulin
- (Russia) Sergei Filippenkov
- (Russia) Lyubomir Kantonistov
- (Russia) Andrei Kondrashov
- (Russia) Aleksandr Panov
- (Russia) Roman Vorobyov

Former USSR countries

- (Azerbaijan) **Vyaçeslav Lıçkin**
- (Azerbaijan) Rizvan Umarov
- (Belarus) Dzmitry Aharodnik
- (Belarus) Alyaksandr Chayka
- (Belarus) Syarhyey Hyerasimets
- (Belarus) **Andrei Lavrik**
- (Belarus) Yuri Shukanov
- (Kyrgyzstan) Andrey Yegorov
- (Lithuania) Rimantas Žvingilas
- (Moldova) Andrei Mațiura
- (Moldova) **Evgheni Hmaruc**
- (Moldova) Serghei Rogaciov
- (Moldova) **Oleg Shishkin**
- (Tajikistan) Andrei Manannikov
- (Ukraine) Oleksandr Kyryukhin

Europe

- (Estonia) Mark Švets
- (North Macedonia) Saša Ilić

Africa

- (Nigeria) Brian Idowu

== Coaches ==
| Name | Nationality | From | To |
|---|---|---|---|
| Pavel Batyrev | Soviet Union | 1936 | 1936 |
| Antonín Fivébr | Czech Republic | 1936 | 1936 |
| Mikhail Butusov | Soviet Union | 1937 | 1938 |
| Vasili Zimmerberg | Soviet Union | 1939 | 1939 |
| P. Batyrev | Soviet Union | 1939 | 1939 |
| Mikhail Okun | Soviet Union | 1940 | 1947 |
| M. Butusov | Soviet Union | 1948 | 1953 |
| Vasili Lotkov | Soviet Union | 1960 | 1961 |
| Nikolai Lyukshinov | Soviet Union | 1961 | 1962 |
| Gennadi Bondarenko | Soviet Union | 1963 | 1964 |
| Arkadi Alov | Soviet Union | 1965 | 1966 |
| G. Bondarenko | Soviet Union | 1966 | 1968 |
| Vyacheslav Solovyov | Soviet Union | 1969 | 1971 |
| Valentin Fyodorov | Soviet Union | 1971 | 1972 |
| Anatoli Vasilyev | Soviet Union | 1973 | 1979 |
| Stanislav Belikov | Soviet Union | 1979 | 1983 |
| G. Bondarenko | Soviet Union | 1984 | 1987 |
| Anatoli Zinchenko | Soviet Union | 1988 | 1989 |
| Vladimir Pronin | Soviet Union; Russia | 1990 | 1992 |
| Vladimir Goncharov | Russia | 1992 | 1993 |
| Aleksandr Fyodorov | Russia | 1994 | 1996 |
| Mark Abramovich Rubin | Russia | 1997 | 1997 |
| Boris Rappoport | Russia | 1998 | 1999 |
| Sergei Lomakin | Russia | 2001 | 2001 |
| Sergei Vedeneev | Russia | 2001 | 2001 |

| Name | Nationality | From | To |
|---|---|---|---|
| S. Lomakin | Russia | 2001 | 2002 |
| Dmitri Galiamin | Russia | 2002 | 2002 |
| Valeri Gladilin | Russia | 2002 | 2002 |
| Oleg Dolmatov | Russia | 2003 | 2003 |
| Vladimir Kazachyonok | Russia | 2003 | 2003 |
| Sergey Dmitriyev | Russia | 2007 | 2007 |
| Yuri Zheludkov | Russia | 2007 | 2007 |
| Leonid Tkachenko | Russia | 2007 | 2008 |
| Vyacheslav Melnikov | Russia | 2008 | 2008 |
| Eduard Malofeyev | Russia | 2008 | 2009 |
| Aleksandr Averyanov | Russia | 2010 | 2010 |
| Grigori Mikhalyuk | Russia | 2010 | 2010 |
| Boris Zhuravlyov | Russia | 2010 | 2010 |
| E. Malofeyev | Russia | 2010 | 2010 |
| Sergey Frantsev | Russia | 2010 | 2010 |
| Igor Zazulin | Russia | 2010 | 2010 |
| Roman Izrailev | Russia | 2011 | 2011 |
| Boris Zhuravlyov | Russia | 2013 | 2013 |
| Pavel Gusev | Russia | 2013 | 2014 |
| Viktor Demidov | Russia | 2014 | 2014 |
| Adyam Kuzyayev | Russia | 2014 | 2015 |
| Aleksandr Tochilin | Russia | 2015 | 2018 |
| Yuri Solntsev | Russia | 2019 | 2020 |
| Sergei Poltavets | Russia | 2020 | 2020 |
| Dmitri Proshin | Russia | 2020 | 2020 |
| Anatoli Bogdanov | Russia | 2020 | 2021 |
| Dmitri Proshin | Russia | 2021 | 2021 |
| Alexandru Curtianu | Moldova | 2021 | 2022 |
| Baris Haravy | Belarus | 2022 | |

== Honours and achievements ==
Soviet Top League:

- 5th Place: 1940, 1945, 1946, 1952

Soviet Cup:

- Semi-Finals: 1938, 1947, 1952

Russian Cup:

- Eighth final: 2003, 2018

Russian Professional Football League

- Champion (3): 2001, 2009, 2017

City Championship:

- Champion (29): 1926–1927, 1930–1931, 1933, 1935–1936, 1938, 1945, 1948, 1950–1951, 1953, 1963–1964, 1966–1968, 1970–1978, 1980–1981, 1993
- Runner-up (1): 2019, 2020. 2021

City Cup:

- Winner (12): 1943–1944, 1948, 1950, 1969–1971, 1973, 1977–1979, 1983, 2019, 2021

== See also ==
- Saint Petersburg derby
- FC Dinamo Moscow
- FC Dynamo Kyiv
- FC Dinamo Tbilisi
- Dynamo Sports Club
- Petrovsky Stadium
