= List of Soviet and Russian football champions =

Football had been played in Russia since the Russian Empire days in the early 1900s, but it was not until 1936, 19 years after the Russian Revolution, that the Soviet Union established a national championship of clubs. Before then local leagues in Moscow and Saint Petersburg/Leningrad were the only prominent league competitions in the country, with some national championships held intermittently from 1912 to 1933, made up of city selections.

Teams in bold indicates doubles won with the Soviet Cup before 1992 and with the Russian Cup thereafter. Teams in italics include Cup winners between the 2nd and 3rd league places.

== Football championship of Russian Empire ==
Year	Champions (number of titles)	Runners-up	Third place	Leading goalscorer	Goals
1912	Saint Petersburg	Moscow	Kharkov / Kiev		
1913	Odessa	Saint Petersburg	Kharkov / Moscow		
1914	cancelled due to World War I				

== Football championship of Russian SFSR among city teams ==
Year	Champions (number of titles)	Runners-up	Third place	Leading goalscorer	Goals
1920	Moscow	MKS Tver	Samara / Mars Yaroslavl		
1921	no championship				
1922	Moscow	Kharkov	Perm / Kazan		
1923	no championship				
1924	Petrograd	Moscow	Viatka / Kazan		
no championship in 1925-26
1927	Moscow	Western Oblast	North Caucasus Krai		
1928	Moscow	Leningrad	Autonomous republics		
no championship in 1929-30
1931	Moscow	Leningrad	North Caucasus Krai / Nizhniy Novgorod Krai		
1932	Leningrad	Moscow	Samara / Sverdlovsk		
1933	no championship				
1934	Voronezh	Ivanovo	Sverdlovsk		
1935	no championship				

== USSR championship ==
Note: according to Dynamo sports society, the first Soviet football championship took place in 1924, while other sources (megabook.ru) indicate that the first championship took place earlier in 1923. In Moscow it was decided to consider the football tournament of the 1924 All-Union festival of physical culture as the first national championship.

Year	Champions (number of titles)	Runners-up	Third place	Leading goalscorer	Goals
1923	Moscow	Southern Railways (Kharkov)			
1924	Kharkov	Petrograd		Yakov Alferov	2
1925	no championship				
1926	no championship				
1927	no championship				
1928	Moscow	Ukrainian SSR			
1929	no championship				
1930	no championship				
1931	Moscow	Russian SFSR	Transcaucasian SFSR		
1932	Moscow	Leningrad		Vasily Smirnov	4
1933	no championship				
1934	no championship				
1935	Moscow	Leningrad	Kharkov	Mikhail Yakushev	6

== Russian SFSR championship ==
Republican level competitions among teams from the Russian SFSR. Until 1960 it included teams that were considered amateurs, after 1960 the competition was conducted as part of the Soviet Second League.
Source: Footballfacts.ru

Year	Champions (number of titles)	Runners-up	Third place	Leading goalscorer	Goals
1948	Dinamo Krasnodar	Dinamo Perm	Krasnoye Znamia Orekhovo-Zuyevo		
1949	Dinamo Stavropol	Dinamo Gorkiy	Krasnoye Znamia Pavlovskiy posad		
1950	MVO Moscow	SKA Khabarovsk	Dinamo Rostov-na-Donu		
1951	ODO Sverdlovsk	Vympel Korolyov	Dinamo Rostov-na-Donu		
1952	Vympel Korolyov	Dinamo Rostov-na-Donu	Zvezda Vyborg		
1953	Torpedo Krasnoyarsk	Krylia Sovetov Voronezh	Zenit Stupino		
1954	Trud Stupino	Torpedo Taganrog	SKA Khabarovsk		
1955	Torpedo Taganrog	Zenit Izhevsk	Iskra Zelenodolsk		
1956	Avangard Sormovo	Terek Groznyi	Lokomotiv Saratov		
1957	Metallurg Volgograd	Sovetskiy Raion Krasnoyarsk	Torpedo Vladimir		
1958	Trud Ramenskoye	SKVO Kuibyshev	Trud Tambov		
1959	Admiralteyets Leningrad	Trudovye Rezervy Leningrad	Trud Voronezh		
1959	ZIP-Energiya	Trud Zelenodolsk	SKA Novosibirsk		
1960	Trud Voronezh	Irtysh Omsk	Volga Kalinin		
1961	Krylia Sovetov Kuibyshev	Terek Groznyi	Dinamo Kirov		
1962	Spartak Krasnodar	Trud Voronezh	Uralmash Sverdlovsk		
1963	Volga Kalinin	Dinamo Kirov	Zvezda Serpukhov		
1964	Rostselmash Rostov-na-Donu	Terek Groznyi	Tekstilshchik Ivanovo		
1965	Spartak Nalchik	Rubin Kazan	Sokol Saratov		
1966	Lokomotiv Kaluga	Spartak Ordzhonikidze	Metallurg Tula		
1967	Dinamo Makhachkala	Volga Ulyanovsk	Volgar Astrakhan		
1968	Mashuk Pyatigorsk	Kalininets Sverdlovsk	Spartak Belgorod		
1969	Druzhba Maykop	Saturn Rybinsk	Iskra Smolensk		
1970	Avtomobilist Nalchik	Spartak Yoshkar-Ola	Kuzbass Kemerovo		
1971	Zvezda Perm	Avtomobilist Nalchik	Iskra Smolensk		
1972	Kuzbass Kemerovo	Metallurg Lipetsk	Amur Blagoveshchensk		
1973	Kuban Krasnodar	Iskra Smolensk	Uralmash Sverdlovsk		
1974	Terek Groznyi	Rubin Kazan			
1975	Dinamo Makhachkala	Terek Groznyi			
1976	Iskra Smolensk	Uralmash Sverdlovsk	Dinamo Leningrad		
1977	Lokomotiv Kaluga	Fakel Voronezh	SKA Khabarovsk		
1978	Voronezh Oblast	Stavropol Krai	Krasnodar Krai		
1979	no competition / Spartakiad of the Peoples of the USSR				
1980	Rotor Volgograd	Zvezda Perm	Torpedo Tolyatti		
1981	Dinamo Kirov	Tekstilshchik Ivanovo	Dinamo Barnaul		
1982	no competition / Spartakiad of the Peoples of the USSR				
1983	Krylia Sovetov Kuibyshev	Spartak Ordzhonikidze	Znamya Truda Orekhovo-Zuyevo		
1984	Zorky Krasnogorsk	Baltika Kaliningrad	Krylia Sovetov Kuibyshev		
1985	Geolog Tyumen	Rostselmash Rostov-na-Donu	Dinamo Bryansk		
1986	Metallurg Lipetsk	Sokol Saratov	Krylia Sovetov Kuibyshev		
1987	Kuban Krasnodar	Zvezda Perm	Tekstilschik Ivanovo		
1988	Tsement Novorossiysk	Uralmash Sverdlovsk	Dinamo Bryansk		
1989	Dinamo Bryansk	Tsement Novorossiysk	Tekstilshchik Kamyshin		
1990	no competition				
1991	Krylia Sovetov Kuibyshev	Rotor Volgograd			

== Soviet League (1936–1991) ==
=== Soviet Group A ===
Year	Champions (number of titles)	Runners-up	Third place	Leading goalscorer	Goals
1936 (spring)	Dynamo Moscow	Dynamo Kiev	Spartak Moscow	Mikhail Semichastny (Dynamo Moscow)	6
1936 (autumn)	Spartak Moscow	Dynamo Moscow	Dinamo Tbilisi	Georgy Glazkov (Spartak Moscow)	7
1937	**Dynamo Moscow** (2)	Spartak Moscow	Dynamo Kiev	Boris Paichadze (Dinamo Tbilisi); Leonid Rumyantsev (Spartak Moscow); Vasily Smirnov (Dynamo Moscow)	8
1938	**Spartak Moscow** (2)	CDKA Moscow	Metallurg Moscow	Makar Goncharenko (Dinamo Kiev)	19
1939	**Spartak Moscow** (3)	Dinamo Tbilisi	CDKA Moscow	Grigory Fedotov (CDKA Moscow)	21
1940	Dynamo Moscow (3)	Dinamo Tbilisi	Spartak Moscow	Grigory Fedotov (CDKA Moscow); Sergei Solovyov (Dynamo Moscow)	21
1941	Cancelled on 24 June due to World War II (Dynamo Moscow had the best record at that time)				
1942–1944	Cancelled due to World War II				

=== Soviet First Group ===
Year	Champions (number of titles)	Runners-up	Third place	Leading goalscorer	Goals
1945	Dynamo Moscow (4)	CDKA Moscow	Torpedo Moscow	Vsevolod Bobrov (CDKA Moscow)	24
1946	CDKA Moscow	Dynamo Moscow	Dinamo Tbilisi	Aleksandr Ponomaryov (Torpedo Moscow)	18
1947	CDKA Moscow (2)	Dynamo Moscow	Dinamo Tbilisi	Vsevolod Bobrov (CDKA Moscow); Valentin Nikolayev (CDKA Moscow); Sergei Solovyov (Dynamo Moscow)	14
1948	**CDKA Moscow** (3)	Dynamo Moscow	Spartak Moscow	Sergei Solovyov (Dynamo Moscow)	25
1949	Dynamo Moscow (5)	CDKA Moscow	Spartak Moscow	Nikita Simonyan (Spartak Moscow)	26

=== Soviet Class A ===
Year	Champions (number of titles)	Runners-up	Third place	Leading goalscorer	Goals
1950	CDKA Moscow (4)	Dynamo Moscow	Dinamo Tbilisi	Nikita Simonyan (Spartak Moscow)	34
1951	**CDSA Moscow** (5)	Dinamo Tbilisi	Shakhter Stalino	Avtandil Gogoberidze (Dinamo Tbilisi)	16
1952	Spartak Moscow (4)	Dynamo Kiev	Dynamo Moscow	Andrey Zazroyev (Dynamo Kiev)	11
1953	Spartak Moscow (5)	Dinamo Tbilisi	Torpedo Moscow	Nikita Simonyan (Spartak Moscow)	14
1954	Dynamo Moscow (6)	Spartak Moscow	Spartak Minsk	Anatoli Ilyin (Spartak Moscow); Vladimir Ilyin (Dynamo Moscow); Antonin Sochnev (Trudovye Reservy Leningrad)	11
1955	Dynamo Moscow (7)	Spartak Moscow	CDSA Moscow	Eduard Streltsov (Torpedo Moscow)	15
1956	Spartak Moscow (6)	Dynamo Moscow	CDSA Moscow	Vasily Buzunov (ODO Sverdlovsk)	17
1957	Dynamo Moscow (8)	Torpedo Moscow	Spartak Moscow	Vasily Buzunov (CSK MO Moscow)	16
1958	**Spartak Moscow** (7)	Dynamo Moscow	CSK MO Moscow	Anatoli Ilyin (Spartak Moscow)	19
1959	Dynamo Moscow (9)	Lokomotiv Moscow	Dinamo Tbilisi	Zaur Kaloyev (Dinamo Tbilisi)	16
1960	**Torpedo Moscow**	Dynamo Kiev	Dynamo Moscow	Zaur Kaloyev (Dinamo Tbilisi); Gennady Gusarov (Torpedo Moscow)	20
1961	Dynamo Kiev	Torpedo Moscow	Spartak Moscow	Gennady Gusarov (Torpedo Moscow)	22
1962	Spartak Moscow (8)	Dynamo Moscow	Dinamo Tbilisi	Mikhail Mustygin (Belarus Minsk)	17

=== Soviet Class A, 1st Group ===
Year	Champions (number of titles)	Runners-up	Third place	Leading goalscorer	Goals
1963	Dynamo Moscow (10)	Spartak Moscow	Dinamo Minsk	Oleg Kopaev (SKA Rostov-on-Don)	27
1964	Dinamo Tbilisi	Torpedo Moscow	CSKA Moscow	Vladimir Fedotov (CSKA Moscow)	16
1965	Torpedo Moscow (2)	Dynamo Kiev	CSKA Moscow	Oleg Kopaev (SKA Rostov-on-Don)	18
1966	**Dynamo Kiev** (2)	SKA Rostov-on-Don	Neftchi Baku	Ilya Datunashvili (Dinamo Tbilisi)	20
1967	Dynamo Kiev (3)	Dynamo Moscow	Dinamo Tbilisi	Mikhail Mustygin (Dinamo Minsk)	19
1968	Dynamo Kiev (4)	Spartak Moscow	Torpedo Moscow	Georgi Gavasheli (Dinamo Tbilisi); Berador Abduraimov (Pakhtakor Tashkent)	22
1969	Spartak Moscow (9)	Dynamo Kiev	Dinamo Tbilisi	Nikolai Osyanin (Spartak Moscow); Vladimir Proskurin (SKA Rostov-on-Don); Dzhemal Kherhadze (Torpedo Kutaisi)	16

=== Soviet Supreme League (Soviet Top League) ===
Year	Champions (number of titles)	Runners-up	Third place	Leading goalscorer	Goals
1970	CSKA Moscow (6)	Dynamo Moscow	Spartak Moscow	Givi Nodia (Dinamo Tbilisi)	17
1971	Dynamo Kiev (5)	Ararat Yerevan	Dinamo Tbilisi	Eduard Malofeev (Dinamo Minsk)	16
1972	Zorya Voroshilovgrad	Dynamo Kiev	Dinamo Tbilisi	Oleg Blokhin (Dynamo Kiev)	14
1973	**Ararat Yerevan**	Dynamo Kiev	Dynamo Moscow	Oleg Blokhin (Dynamo Kiev)	18
1974	**Dynamo Kiev** (6)	Spartak Moscow	Chornomorets Odessa	Oleg Blokhin (Dynamo Kiev)	20
1975	Dynamo Kiev (7)	Shakhtar Donetsk	Dynamo Moscow	Oleg Blokhin (Dynamo Kiev)	18
1976 (spring)	Dynamo Moscow (11)	Ararat Yerevan	Dinamo Tbilisi	Arkady Andreasian (Ararat Yerevan)	8
1976 (autumn)	Torpedo Moscow (3)	Dynamo Kiev	Dinamo Tbilisi	Aleksandr Markin (Zenit Leningrad)	13
1977	Dynamo Kiev (8)	Dinamo Tbilisi	Torpedo Moscow	Oleg Blokhin (Dynamo Kiev)	17
1978	Dinamo Tbilisi (2)	Dynamo Kiev	Shakhtar Donetsk	Georgi Yartsev (Spartak Moscow)	19
1979	Spartak Moscow (10)	Shakhtar Donetsk	Dynamo Kiev	Vitali Starukhin (Shakhtar Donetsk)	26
1980	Dynamo Kiev (9)	Spartak Moscow	Zenit Leningrad	Sergey Andreev (SKA Rostov-on-Don)	20
1981	Dynamo Kiev (10)	Spartak Moscow	Dinamo Tbilisi	Ramaz Shengelia (Dinamo Tbilisi)	23
1982	Dinamo Minsk	Dynamo Kiev	Spartak Moscow	Andrei Yakubik (Pakhtakor Tashkent)	23
1983	Dnipro Dnipropetrovsk	Spartak Moscow	Dinamo Minsk	Yuri Gavrilov (Spartak Moscow)	18
1984	Zenit Leningrad	Spartak Moscow	Dnipro Dnipropetrovsk	Sergey Andreev (SKA Rostov-on-Don)	20
1985	**Dynamo Kiev** (11)	Spartak Moscow	Dnipro Dnipropetrovsk	Oleg Protasov (Dnipro Dnipropetrovsk)	35
1986	Dynamo Kiev (12)	Dynamo Moscow	Spartak Moscow	Aleksandr Borodyuk (Dynamo Moscow)	21
1987	Spartak Moscow (11)	Dnipro Dnipropetrovsk	Žalgiris Vilnius	Oleg Protasov (Dnipro Dnipropetrovsk)	18
1988	Dnipro Dnipropetrovsk (2)	Dynamo Kiev	Torpedo Moscow	Yevhen Shakhov (Dnipro Dnipropetrovsk); Aleksandr Borodyuk (Dynamo Moscow)	16
1989	Spartak Moscow (12)	Dnipro Dnipropetrovsk	Dynamo Kiev	Sergey Rodionov (Spartak Moscow)	16
1990	**Dynamo Kiev** (13)	CSKA Moscow	Dynamo Moscow	Oleg Protasov (Dynamo Kiev); Valery Shmarov (Spartak Moscow)	12
1991	**CSKA Moscow** (7)	Spartak Moscow	Torpedo Moscow	Igor Kolyvanov (Dynamo Moscow)	18

== Russian League (1992–present) ==
=== Russian Top League ===
Year	Champions (number of titles)	Runners-up	Third place	Leading goalscorer	Goals
1992	Spartak Moscow (13)	Spartak Vladikavkaz	Dynamo Moscow	(Azerbaijan) Vali Gasimov (Dynamo Moscow, 1st–8th place) (Russia) Yuri Matveyev (Uralmash, 9th–20th place)	16; 20
1993	**Spartak Moscow** (14)	Rotor Volgograd	Dynamo Moscow	(Russia) Viktor Panchenko (KamAZ Naberezhnye Chelny)	21
1994	Spartak Moscow (15)	Dynamo Moscow	Lokomotiv Moscow	(Russia) Igor Simutenkov (Dynamo Moscow)	21
1995	Spartak-Alania Vladikavkaz	Lokomotiv Moscow	Spartak Moscow	(Russia) Oleg Veretennikov (Rotor Volgograd)	25
1996	Spartak Moscow (16)	Alania Vladikavkaz	Rotor Volgograd	(Russia) Aleksandr Maslov (Rostselmash Rostov-on-Don)	23
1997	**Spartak Moscow** (17)	Rotor Volgograd	Dynamo Moscow	(Russia) Oleg Veretennikov (Rotor Volgograd)	22

=== Russian Top Division ===
Year	Champions (number of titles)	Runners-up	Third place	Leading goalscorerмыФЩ	Goals
1998	Spartak Moscow (18)	CSKA Moscow	Lokomotiv Moscow	(Russia) Oleg Veretennikov (Rotor Volgograd)	22
1999	Spartak Moscow (19)	Lokomotiv Moscow	CSKA Moscow	(Georgia (country)) Georgi Demetradze (Alania Vladikavkaz)	21
2000	Spartak Moscow (20)	Lokomotiv Moscow	Torpedo Moscow	(Russia) Dmitri Loskov (Lokomotiv Moscow)	18
2001	Spartak Moscow (21)	Lokomotiv Moscow	Zenit Saint Petersburg	(Russia) Dmitri Vyazmikin (Torpedo Moscow)	18

=== Russian Premier League ===
Year	Champions (number of titles)	Runners-up	Third place	Leading goalscorer	Goals
2002	Lokomotiv Moscow	CSKA Moscow	Spartak Moscow	(Russia) Rolan Gusev (CSKA Moscow) (Russia) Dmitri Kirichenko (CSKA Moscow)	15
2003	CSKA Moscow (8)	Zenit Saint Petersburg	Rubin Kazan	(Russia) Dmitri Loskov (Lokomotiv Moscow)	14
2004	Lokomotiv Moscow (2)	CSKA Moscow	Krylia Sovetov Samara	(Russia) Aleksandr Kerzhakov (Zenit Saint Petersburg)	18
2005	**CSKA Moscow** (9)	Spartak Moscow	Lokomotiv Moscow	(Russia) Dmitri Kirichenko (FC Moscow)	14
2006	**CSKA Moscow** (10)	Spartak Moscow	Lokomotiv Moscow	(Russia) Roman Pavlyuchenko (Spartak Moscow)	18
2007	Zenit Saint Petersburg (2)	Spartak Moscow	CSKA Moscow	(Russia) Roman Pavlyuchenko (Spartak Moscow) (Russia) Roman Adamov (FC Moscow)	14
2008	Rubin Kazan	CSKA Moscow	Dynamo Moscow	(Brazil) Vágner Love (CSKA Moscow)	20
2009	Rubin Kazan (2)	Spartak Moscow	Zenit Saint Petersburg	(Brazil) Welliton (Spartak Moscow)	21
2010	**Zenit Saint Petersburg** (3)	CSKA Moscow	Rubin Kazan	(Brazil) Welliton (Spartak Moscow)	19
2011–12	Zenit Saint Petersburg (4)	Spartak Moscow	CSKA Moscow	(Ivory Coast) Seydou Doumbia (CSKA Moscow)	28
2012–13	**CSKA Moscow** (11)	Zenit Saint Petersburg	Anzhi Makhachkala	(Armenia) Yura Movsisyan (Spartak Moscow) (Brazil) Wánderson (FC Krasnodar)	13
2013–14	CSKA Moscow (12)	Zenit Saint Petersburg	Lokomotiv Moscow	(Ivory Coast) Seydou Doumbia (CSKA Moscow)	18
2014–15	Zenit Saint Petersburg (5)	CSKA Moscow	Krasnodar	(Brazil) Hulk (Zenit Saint Petersburg)	15
2015–16	CSKA Moscow (13)	Rostov	Zenit Saint Petersburg	(Russia) Fyodor Smolov (Krasnodar)	20
2016–17	Spartak Moscow (22)	CSKA Moscow	Zenit Saint Petersburg	(Russia) Fyodor Smolov (Krasnodar)	18
2017–18	Lokomotiv Moscow (3)	CSKA Moscow	Spartak Moscow	(Netherlands) Quincy Promes (Spartak Moscow)	15
2018–19	Zenit Saint Petersburg (6)	Lokomotiv Moscow	Krasnodar	(Russia) Fyodor Chalov (CSKA Moscow)	15
2019–20	**Zenit Saint Petersburg** (7)	Lokomotiv Moscow	Krasnodar	(Russia) Artem Dzyuba (Zenit Saint Petersburg) (Iran) Sardar Azmoun (Zenit Saint Petersburg)	17
2020–21	Zenit Saint Petersburg (8)	Spartak Moscow	Lokomotiv Moscow	(Russia) Artem Dzyuba (Zenit Saint Petersburg)	20
2021–22	Zenit Saint Petersburg (9)	Sochi	Dynamo Moscow	(Russia) Gamid Agalarov (Ufa)	19
2022–23	Zenit Saint Petersburg (10)	CSKA Moscow	Spartak Moscow	(Brazil) Malcom (Zenit Saint Petersburg)	23
2023–24	**Zenit Saint Petersburg** (11)	Krasnodar	Dynamo Moscow	(Colombia) Mateo Cassierra (Zenit Saint Petersburg)	21
2024–25	Krasnodar (1)	Zenit Saint Petersburg	CSKA Moscow	(Costa Rica) Manfred Ugalde (Spartak Moscow)	17
2025–26	Zenit Saint Petersburg (12)	Krasnodar	Lokomotiv Moscow	(Colombia) Jhon Córdoba (Krasnodar)	17

== Performances by club ==
Spartak Moscow are the most successful club in the overall ranking, having won 22 national titles. They are followed by city rivals CSKA Moscow with thirteen. Dynamo Kiev also have thirteen titles, although the team no longer competes in the Russian football system, since it is now part of Ukraine. Fourth place is taken by Dinamo Moscow, who were the dominant team in Soviet Russia during the 1930s and 1950s. Dinamo Moscow has won eleven titles, although their last title came in 1976. Zenit Saint Petersburg is by far the most successful Russian team outside of Moscow. They have won seven titles, mostly in the 2000s and 2010s.

All clubs are included with all national titles:

Rank	Club	Winners	Runners-up
1	**Spartak Moscow**	22: 1936 (autumn), 1938, 1939, 1952, 1953, 1956, 1958, 1962, 1969, 1979, 1987, 1989, 1992, 1993, 1994, 1996, 1997, 1998, 1999, 2000, 2001, 2016–17	18: 1937, 1954, 1955, 1963, 1968, 1974, 1980, 1981, 1983, 1984, 1985, 1991, 2005, 2006, 2007, 2009, 2011–12, 2020–21
2	**CSKA Moscow**	13: 1946, 1947, 1948, 1950, 1951, 1970, 1991, 2003, 2005, 2006, 2012–13, 2013–14, 2015–16	13: 1938, 1945, 1949, 1990, 1998, 2002, 2004, 2008, 2010, 2014–15, 2016–17, 2017–18, 2022–23
3	(Ukraine) Dynamo Kyiv	13: 1961, 1966, 1967, 1968, 1971, 1974, 1975, 1977, 1980, 1981, 1985, 1986, 1990	11: 1936 (spring), 1952, 1960, 1965, 1969, 1972, 1973, 1976 (autumn), 1978, 1982, 1988
4	**Dynamo Moscow**	11: 1936 (spring), 1937, 1940, 1945, 1949, 1954, 1955, 1957, 1959, 1963, 1976	12: 1936 (autumn), 1946, 1947, 1948, 1950, 1956, 1958, 1962, 1967, 1970, 1986, 1994
5	**Zenit Saint Petersburg**	11: 1984, 2007, 2010, 2011–12, 2014–15, 2018–19, 2019–20, 2020–21, 2021–22, 2022–23, 2023–24	4: 2003, 2012–13, 2013–14, 2024–25
6	**Lokomotiv Moscow**	3: 2002, 2004, 2017–18	7: 1959, 1995, 1999, 2000, 2001, 2018–19, 2019–20
7	**Torpedo Moscow**	3: 1960, 1965, 1976 (autumn)	3: 1957, 1961, 1964
8	(Georgia (country)) Dinamo Tbilisi	2: 1964, 1978	5: 1939, 1940, 1951, 1953, 1977
9	(Ukraine) Dnipro	2: 1983, 1988	2: 1987, 1989
10	**Rubin Kazan**	2: 2008, 2009	
11	(Armenia) Ararat Yerevan	1: 1973	2: 1971, 1976 (spring)
11	**Spartak Vladikavkaz**	1: 1995	2: 1992, 1996
13	**Krasnodar**	1: 2024–25	1: 2023–24
14	(Belarus) Dinamo Minsk	1: 1982	
14	(Ukraine) Zorya Voroshilovgrad	1: 1972	
16	**Rotor Volgograd**		2: 1993, 1997
16	(Ukraine) Shakhtar Donetsk		2: 1975, 1979
18	**FC Rostov**		1: 2015–16
18	**PFC Sochi**		1: 2021–22
18	**SKA Rostov-on-Don**		1: 1966

Note: Teams in bold are teams from Russia, flags indicate a club based outside Russia, namely Ukraine, Georgia, Armenia and Belarus. These teams are no longer eligible for the championship as they play in their own leagues.

== Best finish in Europe by club ==
Table shows best-finish achievements in major European competitions starting from 1965-66 season. For non-Russian teams it is provided the results for Soviet period only.

Club	UEFA Champions League / C1	UEFA Europa League / C2	UEFA Cup Winners' Cup / C2 (old)	UEFA Conference League / C3	UEFA Super Cup	UEFA Intertoto Cup (old)
(Ukraine) Dynamo Kiev	**Semi-finals (2)**; 1976–77; 1986–87	Round of 16 (2); 1979–80; 1989–90	**Winner (2)**; 1974–75;1985–86		**Winner**; 1975	–
Spartak Moscow	**Semi-finals**; 1990–91	**Semi-finals**; 1997–98	**Semi-finals**; 1992–93		–	Round 3; 2004
(Ukraine) Dnipro	**Quarter-finals (2)**; 1984–85; 1989–90	**Runners-up**; 2014–15	–		–	–
CSKA Moscow	**Quarter-finals**; 2009–10	**Winner**; 2004–05	Round of 32 (2); 1991–92; 1994–95		**Runners-up**; 2005	–
(Belarus) Dinamo Minsk	**Quarter-finals**; 1983–84	**Quarter-finals**; 1984–85	**Quarter-finals**; 1987–88		–	–
(Armenia) Ararat Yerevan	**Quarter-finals**; 1974–75	Round of 16; 1972–73	Round of 16; 1975–76		–	–
Zenit Saint Petersburg	Round of 16 (4); 1985–86; 2011–12; 2013–14; 2015–16	**Winner**; 2007–08	–		**Winner**; 2008	**Runners-up**; 2000
Lokomotiv Moscow	Round of 16 (2); 2002–03; 2003–04	Round of 16; 2017–18	**Semi-finals (2)**; 1997–98; 1997–98		–	–
(Georgia (country)) Dinamo Tbilisi	Round of 16; 1979-80	Round of 16 (3); 1973–74; 1977–78; 1987–88	**Winner**; 1980–81		–	–
(Ukraine) Zorya Voroshilovgrad	Round of 16; 1973–74	–	–		–	–
Torpedo Moscow	Round of 32 (2); 1966-67; 1977-78	**Quarter-finals**; 1990–91	**Quarter-finals (2)**; 1967-68; 1986-87		–	**Semi-finals**; 1997
Rubin Kazan	Group Stage (2); 2009-10; 2010-11	**Quarter-finals**; 2012-13	–		–	Round 3; 2007
Krasnodar	Group Stage; 2020-21	Round of 16 (2); 2016-17; 2016-17	-		–	–
Rostov	Group Stage; 2016-17	Round of 16; 2016-17	-		–	**Semi-finals**; 1999
Dynamo Moscow	Qualifying Round 3; 2009–10	Round of 16 (3); 1991–92; 1992–93; 2014–15	**Runners-up**; 1971–72		–	**Semi-finals**; 1997
Alania Vladikavkaz	Qualifying Round; 1996-97	Play-off Round; 2011–12	-		–	–

Table sorted by success at European Cup / UEFA Champions League first and foremost.
