= Soviet Class A First Group =

Association football league in the Soviet Union

- Founded: 1950
- Folded: 1970
- Country: Soviet Union
- Level on pyramid: Level 1 & 2
- Promotion to: none / Class A Top Group
- Relegation to: Soviet Class B / Soviet Class A Second Group
- Last champions: Spartak Moscow top tier Karpaty Lviv second tier
- Most championships: Spartak Moscow (6)

The Soviet Class A First Group (Russian: Чемпионат СССР по футболу (Класс А. Первая группа), Soviet football championship (Class A First Group)) was the top and for a season second highest division of Soviet football, below the 1970 Soviet Class A Top Group. The league was formed in 1950 in place of the First Group of the Soviet football championship and initially was called as Class A of the Soviet football championship.

In 1963 the Class A was expanded into two divisions the Class A First Group and the Class A Second Group, latter becoming the second tier. In 1970 the Soviet Class A was expanded even further adding additional tier to the top and downgrading now the Soviet Class A First Group to the second tier. In 1971 it was replaced with the Soviet First League.

== Winners ==
=== Top tier ===
Season	Champion	Runner-up	3rd position	Top goalscorer
1950	CSKA Moscow	Dynamo Moscow	Dinamo Tbilisi	Nikita Simonyan (Spartak Moscow, 34 goals)
1951	CSKA Moscow (2)	Dinamo Tbilisi	Shakhter Stalino	Avtandil Gogoberidze (Dinamo Tbilisi, 16 goals)
1952	Spartak Moscow	Dynamo Kyiv	Dynamo Moscow	Andrey Zazroyev (Dynamo Kyiv, 11 goals)
1953	Spartak Moscow (2)	Dinamo Tbilisi	Torpedo Moscow	Nikita Simonyan (Spartak Moscow, 14 goals)
1954	Dynamo Moscow	Spartak Moscow	Spartak Minsk	Anatoli Ilyin (Spartak Moscow, 11 goals); Vladimir Ilyin (Dynamo Moscow, 11 goals); Antonin Sochnev (Trudovye Reservy Leningrad, 11 goals)
1955	Dynamo Moscow (2)	Spartak Moscow	CDSA Moscow	Eduard Streltsov (Torpedo Moscow, 15 goals)
1956	Spartak Moscow (3)	Dynamo Moscow	CDSA Moscow	Vasily Buzunov (ODO Sverdlovsk, 17 goals)
1957	Dynamo Moscow (3)	Torpedo Moscow	Spartak Moscow	Vasily Buzunov (CSK MO Moscow, 16 goals)
1958	Spartak Moscow (4)	Dynamo Moscow	CSK MO Moscow	Anatoli Ilyin (Spartak Moscow, 19 goals)
1959	Dynamo Moscow (4)	Lokomotiv Moscow	Dinamo Tbilisi	Zaur Kaloyev (Dinamo Tbilisi, 16 goals)
1960	Torpedo Moscow	Dynamo Kyiv	Dynamo Moscow	Zaur Kaloyev (Dinamo Tbilisi, 20 goals); Gennady Gusarov (Torpedo Moscow, 20 goals)
1961	Dynamo Kyiv	Torpedo Moscow	Spartak Moscow	Gennady Gusarov (Torpedo Moscow, 22 goals)
1962	Spartak Moscow (5)	Dynamo Moscow	Dinamo Tbilisi	Mikhail Mustygin (Belarus Minsk, 17 goals)
1963	Dynamo Moscow (5)	Spartak Moscow	Dinamo Minsk	Oleg Kopayev (SKA Rostov-on-Don, 27 goals)
1964	Dinamo Tbilisi	Torpedo Moscow	CSKA Moscow	Vladimir Fedotov (CSKA Moscow, 16 goals)
1965	Torpedo Moscow (2)	Dynamo Kyiv	CSKA Moscow	Oleg Kopayev (SKA Rostov-on-Don, 18 goals)
1966	Dynamo Kyiv (2)	SKA Rostov-on-Don	Neftyanik Baku	Ilya Datunashvili (Dinamo Tbilisi, 20 goals)
1967	Dynamo Kyiv (3)	Dynamo Moscow	Dinamo Tbilisi	Mikhail Mustygin (Dinamo Minsk, 19 goals)
1968	Dynamo Kyiv (4)	Spartak Moscow	Torpedo Moscow	Georgi Gavasheli (Dinamo Tbilisi, 22 goals); Berador Abduraimov (Pakhtakor Tashkent, 22 goals)
1969	Spartak Moscow (6)	Dynamo Kyiv	Dinamo Tbilisi	Nikolai Osyanin (Spartak Moscow, 16 goals); Vladimir Proskurin (SKA Rostov-on-Don, 16 goals); Dzhemal Kherhadze (Torpedo Kutaisi, 16 goals)

=== Second tier ===
Season	Winner	Runners-up	Third
1970	Karpaty Lviv	Kairat Alma-Aty	Dnipro Dnipropetrovsk
