= List of FC Dynamo Kyiv seasons =

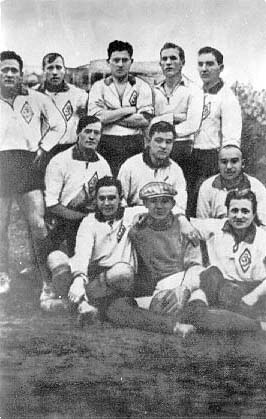
Dynamo Kyiv squad in 1928

FC Dynamo Kyiv is a Ukrainian professional association football club based in the neighborhood of Pechersk, Kyiv (Caves [Monastery]). The club was formed in Kyiv in 1927 as part of network of the Soviet Dynamo proletarian sports society. It was formed in place of the already existing local team of Sovtorgsluzhashchie (Russian word for Soviet retail associates).

== List of seasons ==
=== Ukrainian SSR ===
Season	Division (Name)	Pos./Teams	Pl.	W	D	L	GS	GA	P	Dynamomania	Domestic Cup	Notes
1929										Finalist		
1931										Winner		
1932										Finalist		
1933										Winner		
1934										Finalist		
1935										Winner		

=== Soviet Union ===
Season	Division (Name)	Pos./Teams	Pl.	W	D	L	GS	GA	P	Cup of UkrSSR	Soviet Cup	Notes
1936	1st (Group A)	2/(7)	6	4	0	2	18	11	14	Winner	1/32 finals	spring season
1936	1st (Group A)	6/(8)	7	1	3	3	16	19	12	Winner	1/32 finals	fall season
1937	1st (Group A)	3/(9)	16	7	6	3	33	24	36	Winner	Quarter finals	
1938	1st (Group A)	4/(26)	25	15	6	4	76	35	36	Winner	1/16 finals	Point system change
1939	1st (Group A)	8/(14)	26	9	8	9	39	44	26	Not played	1/16 finals	
1940	1st (Group A)	8/(13)	24	6	9	9	32	49	21	Not played	Not played	
1941	1st (Group A)	8/(15)	9	4	2	3	16	14	10	Not played	Not played	Unofficial (did not finish due to World War II)
No championship in 1942–1944
1944	No championship									Winner	1/8 finals	Cup tournaments took place
1945	1st (First Group)	11/(12)	22	1	6	15	13	50	8	Finalist	1/16 finals	
1946	1st (First Group)	12/(12)	22	4	5	13	18	39	13	Winner	Semi-finals	
1947	1st (First Group)	4/(13)	24	9	9	6	27	31	27	Winner	Quarter finals	
1948	1st (First Group)	10/(14)	26	7	6	13	32	50	20	Winner	Quarter finals	
1949	1st (First Group)	7/(18)	34	17	6	11	48	47	40	Not played	1/8 finals	

Season	Division (Name)	Pos./Teams	Pl.	W	D	L	GS	GA	P	Soviet Cup	Europe		Notes
1950	1st (Class A)	13/(19)	36	10	11	15	39	53	31				
1951	1st (Class A)	8/(15)	28	9	9	10	43	39	27				
1952	1st (Class A)	2/(14)	13	7	3	3	26	14	17				
1953	1st (Class A)	8/(11)	20	6	5	9	21	26	17				
1954	1st (Class A)	5/(13)	24	8	10	6	31	29	26	Winner			
1955	1st (Class A)	6/(12)	22	8	6	8	31	37	22				
1956	1st (Class A)	4/(12)	22	7	10	5	32	31	24	Not played			
1957	1st (Class A)	6/(12)	22	8	7	7	30	30	23				
1958	1st (Class A)	6/(12)	22	7	9	6	40	33	23				
1959	1st (Class A)	7/(12)	22	6	8	8	26	33	20	Not played			
1960	1st (Class A)	1/(11)	20	13	2	5	46	23	28				Qualifying round
1960	1st (Class A)	2/(6)	10	5	1	4	19	14	11				Final group
1961	1st (Class A)	2/(11)	20	12	5	3	41	19	29				Qualifying round
1961	1st (Class A)	1/(10)	30	18	9	3	58	28	45				Final group
1962	1st (Class A)	1/(11)	20	14	5	1	44	20	33				Qualifying round
1962	1st (Class A)	5/(12)	22	8	9	5	36	28	25				Final group
1963	1st (Class A)	9/(20)	38	16	12	10	68	48	44				
1964	1st (Class A)	6/(17)	32	10	16	6	42	29	36	Winner			
1965	1st (Class A)	2/(17)	32	22	6	4	58	22	50				
1966	1st (Class A)	1/(19)	36	23	10	3	66	17	56	Winner	CWC	1/4 finals	
1967	1st (Class A)	1/(19)	36	21	12	3	51	11	54				
1968	1st (Class A)	1/(20)	38	21	15	3	58	25	57		ECC	Second round	
1969	1st (Class A)	1/(10)	18	10	8	0	25	6	28	1/4 finals	ECC	withdrew	Qualifying round
1969	1st (Class A)	2/(14)	26	16	7	3	37	13	39	1/4 finals	ECC	withdrew	Final round
1970	1st (Class A)	7/(17)	32	14	5	13	36	32	33	Semi-finals	ECC	Second round	
1971	1st (Top League)	1/(16)	30	17	10	3	41	17	44	1/8 finals			
1972	1st (Top League)	2/(16)	30	12	11	7	52	38	35	1/8 finals			
1973	1st (Top League)	2/(16)	30	16	8	6	44	23	36	Runner-up	ECC	1/4 finals	Draw games rule
1974	1st (Top League)	1/(16)	30	14	12	4	49	24	40	Winner	UC	Third round	
1975	1st (Top League)	1/(16)	30	17	9	4	53	30	43	1/4 finals	CWC	Winner	Winner of UEFA Super Cup
1976	1st (Top League)	8/(16)	15	5	5	5	14	12	15	1/4 finals	ECC	1/4 finals	spring half
1976	1st (Top League)	2/(16)	15	6	6	3	22	16	18	1/4 finals	ECC	1/4 finals	fall half
1977	1st (Top League)	1/(16)	30	14	15	1	51	12	43	1/4 finals	ECC	Semi-finals	
1978	1st (Top League)	2/(16)	30	15	9	6	42	20	38	Winner	UC	1/32 finals (first round)	Draw games rule
1979	1st (Top League)	3/(18)	34	21	5	8	51	26	47	1/4 finals	ECC	1/8 finals (second round)	
1980	1st (Top League)	1/(18)	34	21	9	4	63	23	51	Semi-finals	UC	1/8 finals (third round)	
1981	1st (Top League)	1/(18)	34	22	9	3	58	26	53	1/4 finals	UC	1/32 finals (first round)	
1982	1st (Top League)	2/(18)	34	18	10	6	58	25	46	Winner	ECC	1/4 finals	
1983	1st (Top League)	7/(18)	34	14	10	10	50	34	38	1/4 finals	ECC	1/4 finals	
1984	1st (Top League)	10/(18)	34	12	13	9	46	30	34	1/8 finals	UC	1/32 finals (first round)	Draw games rule
1985	1st (Top League)	1/(18)	34	20	8	6	64	26	48	Winner			
1986	1st (Top League)	1/(16)	30	14	11	5	53	33	39	1/8 finals	CWC	Winner	Runner-up of UEFA Super Cup
1987	1st (Top League)	6/(16)	30	11	10	9	37	27	32	Winner	ECC	Semi-finals	
1988	1st (Top League)	2/(16)	30	17	9	4	43	19	43	1/8 finals	ECC	1/16 finals (first round)	
1989	1st (Top League)	3/(16)	30	13	12	5	44	27	38	Semi-finals			
1990	1st (Top League)	1/(13)	24	14	6	4	44	20	34	Winner	UC	1/8 finals (third round)	
1991	1st (Top League)	5/(16)	30	13	9	8	43	34	35	1/16 finals	CWC	1/4 finals	
1992	No championship									1/4 finals	ECC	Group stage	Withdrew from Soviet Cup

=== Ukraine ===
Season	Division	Position	Pl.	W	D	L	GS	GA	P	Ukrainian Cup	Ukrainian Super Cup	Europe		Notes
1992	1st (Top League)	2	18	13	4	1	31	13	30	1/4 finals	Not Founded	-		-
1992–93	1st (Top League)	1	30	18	8	4	59	14	44	Winner	Not Founded	UC	1/16 finals (second round)	-
1993–94	1st (Top League)	1	34	23	10	1	61	21	56	1/8 finals	Not Founded	ECL	first round	-
1994–95	1st (Top League)	1	34	25	8	1	87	24	83	1/4 finals	Not Founded	ECL	Group stage	-
1995–96	1st (Top League)	1	34	24	7	3	65	17	79	Winner	Not Founded	ECL	Group stage	-
1996–97	1st (Top League)	1	30	23	4	3	69	20	73	1/8 finals	Not Founded	UC	1/32 finals (first round)	ECL – Qual round
1997–98	1st (Top League)	1	30	23	3	4	70	15	72	Winner	Not Founded	ECL	Quarter-finals	-
1998–99	1st (Top League)	1	30	23	5	2	75	17	74	Winner	Not Founded	ECL	Semi-finals	-
1999-00	1st (Top League)	1	30	27	3	0	85	18	84	Winner	Not Founded	ECL	2nd group stage	-
2000–01	1st (Top League)	1	26	20	4	2	58	17	64	1/16 finals	Not Founded	ECL	1st group stage	-
2001–02	1st (Top League)	2	26	20	5	1	62	9	65	Runner-up	Not Founded	ECL	1st group stage	-
2002–03	1st (Top League)	1	30	23	4	3	66	20	73	Winner	Not Founded	UC	3rd round	ECL – 1st group stage
2003–04	1st (Top League)	1	30	23	4	3	68	20	73	1/2 finals	Not Founded	ECL	1st group stage	-
2004–05	1st (Top League)	2	30	23	4	3	58	14	73	Winner	Winner	UC	Round of 64	ECL – Group stage
2005–06	1st (Top League)	2	30	23	6	1	68	20	75	Winner	Runner-up	ECL	2nd qual round	-
2006–07	1st (Top League)	1	30	22	8	0	67	23	74	Winner	Winner	ECL	Group Stage	-
2007–08	1st (Top League)	2	30	22	5	3	65	26	71	Runner-up	Winner	ECL	Group Stage	-
2008–09	1st (Premier League)	1	30	26	1	3	71	19	79	1/2 finals	Runner-up	UC	Semi-finals	ECL – Group stage
2009–10	1st (Premier League)	2	30	22	5	3	61	16	71	1/4 finals	Winner	ECL	Group Stage	-
2010–11	1st (Premier League)	2	30	20	5	5	60	24	65	Runner-up	-	EL	Quarter-finals	ECL – PO round
2011–12	1st (Premier League)	2	30	23	6	1	56	12	75	1/8 finals	Winner	EL	Group Stage	ECL – 3rd QR
2012–13	1st (Premier League)	3	30	20	2	8	55	23	62	1/16 finals	-	EL	Round of 32	ECL – Group stage
2013–14	1st (Premier League)	4	28	16	5	7	55	33	53	Winner	-	EL	Round of 32	-
2014–15	1st (Premier League)	1	26	20	6	0	65	12	66	Winner	Runner-up	EL	Quarter-finals	-
2015–16	1st (Premier League)	1	26	23	1	2	54	11	70	1/4 finals	Runner-up	ECL	Round of 16	-
2016–17	1st (Premier League)	2	32	21	4	7	69	33	67	Runner-up	Winner	ECL	Group Stage	-
2017–18	1st (Premier League)	2	32	22	7	3	64	25	73	Runner-up	Runner-up	EL	Round of 16	ECL – 3rd QR
2018–19	1st (Premier League)	2	32	22	6	4	54	18	72	1/4 finals	Winner	EL	Round of 16	ECL – PO round
2019–20	1st (Premier League)	2	32	18	5	9	65	35	59	Winner	Winner	EL	Group Stage	ECL – 3rd QR
2020–21	1st (Premier League)	1	26	20	5	1	59	15	65	Winner	Winner	EL	Round of 16 (1/8 finals)	ECL – Group stage
2021–22 was terminated	1st (Premier League)	2 (after 18/30)	18	14	3	1	47	9	45	Not played after 1/8 finals	Runner-up	ECL	Group Stage	began on 24.02.2022 Russian invasion of Ukraine
2022-23	1st (Premier League)	4	30	18	6	6	51	25	60	Not played	Not played	EL	Group Stage	ECL – PO round
2023-24	1st (Premier League)	2	30	22	3	5	72	28	69	1/8 finals	Not played	CL	PO round	-
2024-25	1st (Premier League)	1	30	20	10	0	61	19	70	Runner-up	Not played	EL	League phase	ECL – PO round
2025-26	1st (Premier League)	4	30	17	6	7	66	36	57	Winner	Not played	CL	League phase	ECL – 3rd qual round EL - PO round
2026-27	1st (Premier League)	6	4	2	1	1	4	5	7	1/8 finals	Not played	EL	Third qualifying round	-

== See also ==
- The Invincibles (football)
