= 1959 in Soviet football =

Football in the Soviet Union
- Season: 1959

Men's football
- Class A: Dinamo Moscow
- Class B: Trud Voronezh (Group 1); Trudovye Rezervy Leningrad (Group 2); Spartak Yerevan (Group 3); Lokomotiv Vinnitsa (Group 4); Admiralteyets Leningrad (Group 5); Pamir Leninabad (Group 6); SKVO Sverdlovsk (Group 7)
- Soviet Cup: none

The 1959 Soviet football championship was the 27th seasons of competitive football in the Soviet Union and the 21st among teams of sports societies and factories. Dinamo Moscow won the championship becoming the Soviet domestic champions for the ninth time.

== Honours ==
Competition	Winner	Runner-up
Class A	Dinamo Moscow (9*)	Lokomotiv Moscow
Class B	Trud Voronezh (Group 1)	Dinamo Kirov (Group 1)
Class B	Trudovye Rezervy Leningrad (Group 2)	Trud Glukhovo (Group 2)
Class B	Spartak Yerevan (Group 3)	Terek Grozny (Group 3)
Class B	Lokomotiv Vinnitsa (Group 4)	Baltika Kaliningrad (Group 4)
Class B	Admiralteyets Leningrad (Group 5)	Volga Kalinin (Group 5)
Class B	Pamir Leninabad (Group 6)	Mashinostroitel Sverdlovsk (Group 6)
Class B	SKVO Sverdlovsk (Group 7)	Lokomotiv Krasnoyarsk (Group 7)
Soviet Cup	N/A	N/A

Notes = Number in parentheses is the times that club has won that honour. * indicates new record for competition

== Soviet Union football championship ==
=== Class A ===
Pos	Team	Pld	W	D	L	GF	GA	GD	Pts
1	(Russian Soviet Federative Socialist Republic) Dynamo Moscow (C)	22	13	5	4	42	21	+21	31
2	(Russian Soviet Federative Socialist Republic) Lokomotiv Moscow	22	12	5	5	42	25	+17	29
3	(Georgian Soviet Socialist Republic) Dynamo Tbilisi	22	12	3	7	48	33	+15	27
4	(Russian Soviet Federative Socialist Republic) SKA Rostov-on-Don	22	11	4	7	37	31	+6	26
5	(Russian Soviet Federative Socialist Republic) Torpedo Moscow	22	11	3	8	27	23	+4	25
6	(Russian Soviet Federative Socialist Republic) Spartak Moscow	22	8	8	6	32	28	+4	24
7	(Ukrainian Soviet Socialist Republic) Dynamo Kiev	22	6	8	8	26	33	−7	20
8	(Russian Soviet Federative Socialist Republic) Zenit Leningrad	22	8	4	10	29	38	−9	20
9	(Russian Soviet Federative Socialist Republic) CSK MO Moscow	22	8	3	11	29	27	+2	19
10	(Moldavian Soviet Socialist Republic) Moldova Kishinyov	22	6	5	11	22	45	−23	17
11	(Russian Soviet Federative Socialist Republic) Krylia Sovetov Kuybyshev	22	6	1	15	26	37	−11	13
12	(Ukrainian Soviet Socialist Republic) Shakhtyor Stalino	22	4	5	13	24	43	−19	13

Source: rsssf.com
(C) Champions

=== Class B ===
==== Group 1 ====
Pos	Rep	Team	Pld	W	D	L	GF	GA	GD	Pts
1	RUS	FC Trud Voronezh (Note: Trud Voronezh was called Krylya Sovetov.)	28	20	6	2	57	16	+41	46
2	RUS	FC Dinamo Kirov	28	14	11	3	47	17	+30	39
3	UKR	FC Avangard Nikolayev	28	14	9	5	52	28	+24	37
4	UKR	FC Metallurg Dnepropetrovsk	28	14	6	8	47	37	+10	34
5	RUS	FC Iskra Kazan	28	12	9	7	36	27	+9	33
6	UKR	FC Metallurg Zaporozhye	28	14	4	10	40	30	+10	32
7	RUS	FC Khimik Yaroslavl	28	10	8	10	31	28	+3	28
8	RUS	FC Lokomotiv Saratov	28	8	11	9	39	32	+7	27
9	RUS	FC Spartak Leningrad	28	11	5	12	43	48	−5	27
10	UKR	FC Spartak Kherson	28	5	14	9	31	35	−4	24
11	UKR	FC Khimik Dneprodzerzhinsk	28	9	6	13	35	46	−11	24
12	RUS	FC Trudoviye Rezervy Lipetsk	28	8	8	12	26	41	−15	24
13	RUS	FC Torpedo Vladimir	28	6	9	13	26	36	−10	21
14	RUS	FC Trud Ryazan	28	4	5	19	20	53	−33	13
15	MDA	FC Lokomotiv Bendery	28	3	5	20	19	75	−56	11

==== Group 2 ====
Pos	Rep	Team	Pld	W	D	L	GF	GA	GD	Pts
1	RUS	FC Trudovye Rezervy Leningrad	28	19	6	3	55	19	+36	44
2	RUS	FC Trud Glukhovo	28	13	11	4	41	23	+18	37
3	UKR	FC Avangard Kharkov	28	13	11	4	40	26	+14	37
4	UKR	FC Kolhospnik Cherkassy	28	14	8	6	36	24	+12	36
5	UKR	FC Arsenal Kiev	28	13	8	7	49	37	+12	34
6	UKR	FC Zvezda Kirovograd	28	11	10	7	42	21	+21	32
7	BLR	FC Spartak Minsk	28	13	5	10	33	28	+5	31
8	RUS	FC Shakhtyor Stalinogorsk (Note: Shakhtyor Stalinogorsk was called Trud.)	28	9	11	8	24	23	+1	29
9	UKR	FC Avangard Zhitomir	28	9	9	10	41	34	+7	27
10	RUS	FC Znamya Truda Orekhovo-Zuyevo	28	9	8	11	33	39	−6	26
11	RUS	FC Trudovye Rezervy Kursk	28	6	13	9	42	50	−8	25
12	UKR	FC Avangard Krivoi Rog	28	7	5	16	24	51	−27	19
13	RUS	FC Trud Tula	28	5	8	15	26	44	−18	18
14	UKR	FC Kolhospnik Poltava	28	6	6	16	23	46	−23	18
15	BLR	FC Lokomotiv Gomel	28	0	7	21	17	61	−44	7

==== Group 3 ====
Pos	Rep	Team	Pld	W	D	L	GF	GA	GD	Pts
1	ARM	FC Spartak Yerevan	26	16	9	1	41	18	+23	41
2	RUS	FC Terek Grozny	26	14	7	5	35	23	+12	35
3	RUS	FC Torpedo Taganrog	26	14	5	7	35	25	+10	33
4	ARM	FC Shirak Leninakan	26	10	8	8	32	27	+5	28
5	RUS	FC Kuban Krasnodar	26	10	8	8	35	32	+3	28
6	GEO	FC Torpedo Kutaisi (Note: Torpedo Kutaisi was called Lokomotiv.)	26	11	6	9	36	34	+2	28
7	GEO	FC SKVO Tbilisi	26	12	3	11	51	41	+10	27
8	RUS	FC RostSelMash Rostov-na-Donu	26	10	5	11	46	38	+8	25
9	RUS	FC Spartak Stavropol	26	9	5	12	30	35	−5	23
10	RUS	FC Spartak Nalchik	26	8	6	12	30	40	−10	22
11	GEO	FC Lokomotiv Tbilisi	26	8	5	13	39	45	−6	21
12	AZE	FC Neftyanik Baku	26	7	6	13	25	38	−13	20
13	RUS	FC Temp Makhachkala	26	5	7	14	20	38	−18	17
14	AZE	FC Textilshchik Kirovabad	26	7	2	17	31	52	−21	16

==== Group 4 ====
Pos	Rep	Team	Pld	W	D	L	GF	GA	GD	Pts
1	UKR	FC Lokomotiv Vinnitsa	28	17	7	4	59	30	+29	41
2	RUS	FC Baltika Kaliningrad	28	17	6	5	58	27	+31	40
3	UKR	SKVO Odessa	28	16	4	8	41	26	+15	36
4	UKR	FC Chernomorets Odessa	28	15	4	9	40	25	+15	34
5	LTU	Spartak Vilnius	28	14	6	8	38	31	+7	34
6	UKR	SKVO Lvov	28	14	5	9	48	27	+21	33
7	UKR	FC Spartak Uzhgorod	28	12	5	11	34	34	0	29
8	EST	Dinamo Tallinn	28	11	6	11	37	35	+2	28
9	UKR	FC Kolhospnyk Rovno	28	8	8	12	49	49	0	24
10	UKR	SKCF Sevastopol	28	9	5	14	31	46	−15	23
11	LVA	FC Daugava Riga	28	7	7	14	32	44	−12	21
12	UKR	FC Avangard Simferopol	28	6	9	13	20	38	−18	21
13	BLR	FC Urozhai Minsk	28	7	6	15	25	46	−21	20
14	UKR	FC Spartak Stanislav	28	7	4	17	26	53	−27	18
15	UKR	FC Avangard Ternopol	28	6	6	16	23	50	−27	18

==== Group 5 ====
Pos	Rep	Team	Pld	W	D	L	GF	GA	GD	Pts
1	RUS	FC Admiralteyets Leningrad	26	13	10	3	43	27	+16	36
2	RUS	FC Volga Kalinin	26	15	6	5	58	31	+27	36
3	RUS	FC Zenit Izhevsk	26	14	6	6	48	33	+15	34
4	UKR	FC Trudoviye Rezervy Lugansk	26	15	3	8	55	31	+24	33
5	UKR	FC Lokomotiv Stalino	26	15	3	8	58	42	+16	33
6	UKR	FC Shakhtyor Kadiyevka	26	10	8	8	29	28	+1	28
7	RUS	FC Traktor Stalingrad	26	10	6	10	46	39	+7	26
8	RUS	FC Torpedo Gorkiy	26	9	7	10	39	37	+2	25
9	RUS	FC Raketa Gorkiy	26	7	8	11	33	39	−6	22
10	RUS	FC Spartak Ulyanovsk (Note: Spartak Ulyanovsk was called Dinamo.)	26	9	3	14	36	53	−17	21
11	RUS	FC Textilshchik Ivanovo	26	5	9	12	29	45	−16	19
12	UKR	FC Shakhtyor Gorlovka	26	7	5	14	25	47	−22	19
13	RUS	FC Energiya Volzhskiy	26	6	7	13	24	50	−26	19
14	RUS	FC Shakhtyor Shakhty	26	5	3	18	29	60	−31	13

===== Play-Off for 1st place =====
[in Rostov-na-Donu]

- Admiralteyets Leningrad 4-1 Volga Kalinin

==== Group 6 ====
Pos	Rep	Team	Pld	W	D	L	GF	GA	GD	Pts
1	TJK	FC Pamir Leninabad	26	16	4	6	41	34	+7	36
2	RUS	FC Mashinostroitel Sverdlovsk	26	13	6	7	51	29	+22	32
3	RUS	FC Metallurg Magnitogorsk	26	15	2	9	46	31	+15	32
4	UZB	FC Pahtakor Tashkent	26	13	6	7	40	33	+7	32
5	RUS	FC Zvezda Perm	26	13	5	8	41	31	+10	31
6	KAZ	FC Kayrat Alma-Ata	26	11	8	7	46	37	+9	30
7	UZB	FC Trudoviye Rezervy Tashkent	26	11	7	8	33	28	+5	29
8	KGZ	FC Spartak Frunze	26	8	10	8	36	36	0	26
9	RUS	FC Metallurg Nizhniy Tagil	26	9	6	11	44	36	+8	24
10	RUS	FC Lokomotiv Chelyabinsk	26	7	6	13	34	40	−6	20
11	KAZ	FC Shakhtyor Karaganda	26	8	4	14	36	49	−13	20
12	TKM	FC Kolhozchi Ashkhabad	26	9	2	15	36	51	−15	20
13	RUS	FC Stroitel Ufa (Note: Stroitel Ufa was called Devon.)	26	7	5	14	25	39	−14	19
14	TJK	FC Hosilot Stalinabad	26	6	1	19	26	61	−35	13

==== Group 7 ====
[All teams are from Russian Federation] 

Pos	Team	Pld	W	D	L	GF	GA	GD	Pts
1	FC SKVO Sverdlovsk	26	17	5	4	64	24	+40	39
2	FC Lokomotiv Krasnoyarsk	26	17	5	4	50	20	+30	39
3	FC SKVO Khabarovsk	26	14	8	4	39	23	+16	36
4	FC Khimik Kemerovo	26	14	5	7	56	38	+18	33
5	FC SibSelMash Novosibirsk	26	12	6	8	47	37	+10	30
6	FC Irtysh Omsk	26	11	5	10	35	44	−9	27
7	FC Metallurg Stalinsk	26	10	6	10	33	35	−2	26
8	FC Urozhai Barnaul	26	11	3	12	43	39	+4	25
9	FC SibElectroMotor Tomsk (Note: SibElectroMotor Tomsk was called Tomich.)	26	9	6	11	41	50	−9	24
10	FC Lokomotiv Komsomolsk-na-Amure	26	7	9	10	21	31	−10	23
11	FC Energiya Irkutsk	26	8	6	12	30	34	−4	22
12	FC SKVO Chita	26	6	3	17	22	52	−30	15
13	FC Lokomotiv Ulan-Ude	26	5	4	17	23	52	−29	14
14	FC Luch Vladivostok	26	5	1	20	25	50	−25	11

===== Play-Off for 1st place =====
[in Rostov-na-Donu]

- SKVO Sverdlovsk 4-1 Lokomotiv Krasnoyarsk

==== Final (Russian Federation) ====
[Nov 6-10, Grozny] 

Pos	Team	Pld	W	D	L	GF	GA	GD	Pts
1	FC Admiralteyets Leningrad	3	2	1	0	7	0	+7	5
2	FC Trudovye Rezervy Leningrad	3	2	0	1	5	5	0	4
3	FC Trud Voronezh	3	1	1	1	6	2	+4	3
4	FC SKVO Sverdlovsk	3	0	0	3	1	12	−11	0

Source: rsssf.com

=== Top goalscorers ===
Class A

- Zaur Kaloyev (Dinamo Tbilisi) – 16 goals
