= Vladimir Dolbonosov =

Vladimir Dolbonosov is the name of:

- Vladimir Dolbonosov (footballer, born 1949) (1949–2014), Soviet defender who played in the European Cup Winners' Cup 1971–72 finals
- Vladimir Dolbonosov (footballer, born 1970), Soviet and Russian midfielder
