= 1967 Neftyanik Baku season =

Neftyanik Baku
1967 season
- Stadium: Tofik Bakhramov Stadium
- Soviet Top League: 5th
- Soviet Cup: Semi-finals

The Neftyanik Baku 1967 season was Neftyanik Baku's 11th Soviet Top League season.

== Competitions ==
=== Soviet Top League ===
==== Table ====
Pos	Team	Pld	W	D	L	GF	GA	GD	Pts
3	(Georgian Soviet Socialist Republic) Dinamo Tbilisi	36	16	13	7	53	33	+20	45
4	(Byelorussian Soviet Socialist Republic) Dinamo Minsk	36	13	17	6	47	31	+16	43
5	(Azerbaijan Soviet Socialist Republic) Neftyanik Baku	36	16	10	10	51	33	+18	42
6	(Ukrainian Soviet Socialist Republic) Shakhtar Donetsk	36	13	16	7	43	38	+5	42
7	(Russian Soviet Federative Socialist Republic) Spartak Moscow	36	13	14	9	38	30	+8	40

Source: rsssf.com

=== Goal scorers ===
14 goals

- Eduard Markarov

13 goals

- Anatoliy Banishevskiy
