= Yury Belyayev (footballer) =

Soviet footballer and coach (1934–2019)

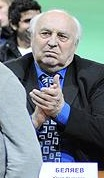
- Belyayev meeting with CSKA Moscow supporters

Personal information
- Full name: Yury Ivanovich Belyayev
- Date of birth: 2 April 1934
- Place of birth: Moscow, Soviet Union
- Date of death: 14 December 2019 (aged 85)
- Height: 1.79 m (5 ft 10 in)
- Position: Forward

Senior career*
Years	Team	Apps	(Gls)
1951	CSDA Moscow		
1952—1954	Avangard Kolomna		
1955–1960	CSKA Moscow	111	(52)

International career
1956	USSR		

Managerial career
- 1966–1967: CSKA Moscow (coach)
Medal record
Representing Soviet Union
Olympic Games
Gold medal – first place	1956 Melbourne	Team
- * Club domestic league appearances and goals

Yury Ivanovich Belyayev (Russian: Юрий Иванович Беляев; 2 April 1934 – 14 December 2019) was a Soviet football player and coach. A forward, he played in 111 matches for CSKA Moscow, scoring 52 goals. He was a member of the national team that won a gold medal at the 1956 Summer Olympics, but he did not play in any matches.

Belyayev came up in the youth system of CSKA Moscow but moved to Avangard Kolomna in 1952. He returned to the Red Army team in 1955 where he played for five seasons. Over that span, he was part of a squad that won the Russian Cup in 1955.

After retiring from playing, he became a coach. In 1966, he was named as a coach at CSKA where he spent one season. He returned to the coaching staff in 1982 for one season. From 1974 to 1980, he coached in the Soviet Armed Forces.

In 1991, Belyayev was honored as a Merited Master of Sport by the Soviet Union.

On 14 December 2019, Belyayev died at the age of 85.
