= 1956 Soviet Top League =

18th season of top-tier football league in Soviet Union

Soviet Top League
- Season: 1956

Twelve teams took part in the league with FC Spartak Moscow winning the championship.

== League standings ==
Pos	Team	Pld	W	D	L	GF	GA	GD	Pts	Qualification
1	(Russian Soviet Federative Socialist Republic) Spartak Moscow (C)	22	15	4	3	68	28	+40	34	League champions
2	(Russian Soviet Federative Socialist Republic) Dynamo Moscow	22	10	8	4	45	31	+14	28	
3	(Russian Soviet Federative Socialist Republic) CDSA Moscow	22	10	5	7	40	32	+8	25	
4	(Ukrainian Soviet Socialist Republic) Dynamo Kiev	22	7	10	5	32	31	+1	24	
5	(Russian Soviet Federative Socialist Republic) Torpedo Moscow	22	8	7	7	40	37	+3	23	
6	(Moldavian Soviet Socialist Republic) Burevestnik Kishinyov	22	9	5	8	38	49	−11	23	
7	(Ukrainian Soviet Socialist Republic) Shakhtyor Stalino	22	7	7	8	30	39	−9	21	
8	(Georgian Soviet Socialist Republic) Dynamo Tbilisi	22	8	4	10	42	46	−4	20	
9	(Russian Soviet Federative Socialist Republic) Zenit Leningrad	22	4	11	7	27	43	−16	19	
10	(Russian Soviet Federative Socialist Republic) Lokomotiv Moscow	22	5	8	9	38	28	+10	18	
11	(Russian Soviet Federative Socialist Republic) ODO Sverdlovsk (R)	22	6	4	12	31	45	−14	16	Relegation to Class B
12	(Russian Soviet Federative Socialist Republic) Trudovyye Rezervy Leningrad (R)	22	3	7	12	25	47	−22	13	Relegation to Class B

Source: rsssf.com
(C) Champions; (R) Relegated

== Results ==
Home \ Away	BUR	CDS	DYK	DYN	DTB	LOK	ODO	SHA	SPA	TOR	TRL	ZEN
Burevestnik Chişinău		3–1	3–3	2–2	2–1	2–1	3–2	4–3	0–3	2–2	2–1	2–3
CDSA Moscow	1–0		1–2	2–2	3–2	2–1	2–0	0–1	3–4	4–2	4–2	3–1
Dynamo Kiev	2–1	1–0		0–2	2–1	0–0	3–2	1–2	1–1	1–1	1–1	1–1
Dynamo Moscow	6–0	1–0	0–2		5–2	1–1	2–3	2–1	1–1	3–2	5–0	4–0
Dynamo Tbilisi	3–0	1–1	3–1	1–1		0–1	2–0	2–0	2–3	4–2	2–1	4–0
Lokomotiv Moscow	1–1	2–2	0–0	7–1	9–2		1–2	3–0	1–2	1–1	0–1	1–2
ODO Sverdlovsk	1–2	0–1	1–1	0–1	4–2	1–4		0–1	3–1	2–2	1–1	1–3
Shakhtyor Stalino	2–0	2–2	1–1	1–1	5–3	1–0	2–5		0–5	1–1	4–1	0–0
Spartak Moscow	9–2	3–0	4–3	1–1	4–2	3–1	6–0	5–1		2–1	3–0	1–1
Torpedo Moscow	1–4	0–0	0–0	2–0	1–2	2–1	4–0	2–1	2–0		5–3	3–1
Trudovyye Rezervy Leningrad	0–2	1–3	1–5	0–1	1–1	1–1	1–3	0–0	3–1	4–1		1–1
Zenit Leningrad	1–1	1–5	5–1	3–3	0–0	1–1	0–0	1–1	0–6	1–3	1–1	

Legend: Blue = home team win; Yellow = draw; Red = away team win.

== Top scorers ==
17 goals

- Vasily Buzunov (ODO Sverdlovsk)

16 goals

- Nikita Simonyan (Spartak Moscow)

15 goals

- Yuri Belyayev (CDSA Moscow)

14 goals

- Anatoli Isayev (Spartak Moscow)

13 goals

- Valentin Ivanov (Torpedo Moscow)

12 goals

- Alakbar Mammadov (Dynamo Moscow)
- Eduard Streltsov (Torpedo Moscow)

11 goals

- Avtandil Chkuaseli (Dinamo Tbilisi)
- Ivan Mozer (Spartak Moscow)

9 goals

- Boris Khasaya (Dinamo Tbilisi)
- Pyotr Ponomarenko (Shakhtyor Stalino)
- Viktor Sokolov (Lokomotiv Moscow)
- Vitali Vatskevich (Burevestnik Kishinyov)
