= 1957 Soviet Top League =

19th season of top-tier football league in Soviet Union

Soviet Top League
- Season: 1957

12 teams took part in the league with FC Dynamo Moscow winning the championship.

== League standings ==
Pos	Team	Pld	W	D	L	GF	GA	GD	Pts	Qualification or relegation
1	(Russian Soviet Federative Socialist Republic) Dynamo Moscow (C)	22	16	4	2	49	15	+34	36	League champions
2	(Russian Soviet Federative Socialist Republic) Torpedo Moscow	22	11	6	5	46	23	+23	28	
3	(Russian Soviet Federative Socialist Republic) Spartak Moscow	22	11	6	5	43	28	+15	28	
4	(Russian Soviet Federative Socialist Republic) Lokomotiv Moscow	22	12	4	6	39	27	+12	28	
5	(Russian Soviet Federative Socialist Republic) CSK MO Moscow	22	13	1	8	51	31	+20	27	
6	(Ukrainian Soviet Socialist Republic) Dynamo Kiev	22	8	7	7	30	30	0	23	
7	(Georgian Soviet Socialist Republic) Dynamo Tbilisi	22	8	5	9	27	33	−6	21	
8	(Ukrainian Soviet Socialist Republic) Shakhtyor Stalino	22	7	5	10	19	35	−16	19	
9	(Moldavian Soviet Socialist Republic) Burevestnik Kishinyov	22	4	10	8	24	36	−12	18	
10	(Russian Soviet Federative Socialist Republic) Zenit Leningrad	22	4	7	11	23	41	−18	15	
11	(Russian Soviet Federative Socialist Republic) Krylia Sovetov Kuybyshev	22	2	8	12	9	32	−23	12	
12	(Byelorussian Soviet Socialist Republic) Spartak Minsk (R)	22	1	7	14	11	40	−29	9	Relegation to Class B

Source: rsssf.com
(C) Champions; (R) Relegated

== Results ==
Home \ Away	BUR	CSK	DYK	DYN	DTB	KRY	LOK	SHA	SMN	SPA	TOR	ZEN
Burevestnik Chisinau		0–1	1–0	1–1	1–1	1–0	2–2	0–2	0–0	1–1	0–2	0–1
CSK MO Moscow	6–1		2–4	0–1	2–0	5–0	0–2	5–1	3–1	1–3	5–3	3–1
Dynamo Kiev	0–0	0–4		0–0	2–0	2–0	0–1	2–0	1–1	2–1	0–0	5–2
Dynamo Moscow	6–1	0–2	3–2		4–2	6–0	4–1	7–2	3–0	1–1	1–0	2–0
Dynamo Tbilisi	0–3	2–1	0–0	1–2		1–0	2–1	3–1	4–1	1–2	2–1	2–0
Krylia Sovetov Kuybyshev	0–0	1–3	0–0	1–2	0–0		0–2	1–1	4–0	1–0	0–2	0–0
Lokomotiv Moscow	3–3	4–1	3–4	0–2	0–0	0–0		3–0	2–0	2–1	1–2	2–1
Shakhtyor Stalino	1–0	1–0	2–0	0–1	1–0	2–0	0–2		1–0	0–0	0–4	1–1
Spartak Minsk	0–2	1–4	0–1	0–0	0–2	0–0	1–3	0–0		0–4	2–2	2–0
Spartak Moscow	4–4	0–1	3–2	1–0	5–2	2–0	2–1	3–2	2–1		0–0	3–4
Torpedo Moscow	3–3	4–1	5–1	0–1	5–1	1–1	1–2	2–0	1–0	1–1		2–0
Zenit Leningrad	2–0	1–1	2–2	0–2	1–1	2–0	1–2	1–1	1–1	1–4	1–5	

Legend: Blue = home team win; Yellow = draw; Red = away team win.

== Top scorers ==
16 goals

- Vasily Buzunov (CSK MO Moscow)

14 goals

- Valentin Ivanov (Torpedo Moscow)

13 goals

- Aleksei Mamykin (Dynamo Moscow)

12 goals

- Nikita Simonyan (Spartak Moscow)
- Viktor Sokolov (Lokomotiv Moscow)
- Eduard Streltsov (Torpedo Moscow)

10 goals

- Yuri Belyayev (CSK MO Moscow)
- Genrikh Fedosov (Dynamo Moscow)

9 goals

- Mikhail Koman (Dynamo Kiev)
- Viktor Voroshilov (Lokomotiv Moscow)
