= 1960 Soviet Top League =

22nd season of top-tier football league in Soviet Union

Class A Soviet Football Championship
- Season: 1960
- Dates: 9 April – 24 October
- Champions: Torpedo Moscow (1st title)

The 1960 Soviet Football Championship, Class A (Russian: Чемпионат СССР по футболу 1960 (класс «А»)) was the 22nd season of the Soviet top-tier football competition.

22 teams took part in the league with FC Torpedo Moscow winning the championship for the first time.

== Round 1 ==
=== Subgroup 1 ===
==== Table ====
Pos	Team	Pld	W	D	L	GF	GA	GD	Pts	Qualification
1	(Russian Soviet Federative Socialist Republic) Torpedo Moscow	20	14	3	3	39	16	+23	31	Qualification for Places 1–6 group
2	(Russian Soviet Federative Socialist Republic) SKA Rostov-on-Don	20	9	7	4	33	27	+6	25	Qualification for Places 1–6 group
3	(Russian Soviet Federative Socialist Republic) Dynamo Moscow	20	9	6	5	32	15	+17	24	Qualification for Places 1–6 group
4	(Georgian Soviet Socialist Republic) Dynamo Tbilisi	20	9	6	5	49	32	+17	24	Qualification for Places 7–12 group
5	(Latvian Soviet Socialist Republic) Daugava Riga	20	8	7	5	25	18	+7	23	Qualification for Places 7–12 group
6	(Armenian Soviet Socialist Republic) Ararat Yerevan	20	8	7	5	36	28	+8	23	Qualification for Places 7–12 group
7	(Russian Soviet Federative Socialist Republic) Zenit Leningrad	20	9	4	7	34	25	+9	22	Qualification for Places 13–18 group
8	(Uzbek Soviet Socialist Republic) Pakhtakor Tashkent	20	7	4	9	25	35	−10	18	Qualification for Places 13–18 group
9	(Ukrainian Soviet Socialist Republic) Avangard Kharkiv	20	4	6	10	17	30	−13	14	Qualification for Places 13–18 group
10	(Moldavian Soviet Socialist Republic) Moldova Kishinyov	20	4	5	11	18	34	−16	13	Qualification for Places 19–22 group
11	(Estonian Soviet Socialist Republic) Kalev Tallinn	20	0	3	17	13	61	−48	3	Qualification for Places 19–22 group

Source: rsssf.com

==== Results ====
Home \ Away	AVA	DAU	DYN	DTB	KAL	MOL	PAK	SKA	SYE	TOR	ZEN
Avangard Kharkiv		2–0	2–1	0–2	3–0	1–1	0–1	0–0	2–2	0–1	0–0
Daugava Riga	0–0		0–2	2–1	4–0	2–1	4–0	1–1	2–0	1–0	0–1
Dynamo Moscow	1–2	2–2		5–0	4–0	1–0	0–0	2–2	2–1	0–1	3–0
Dynamo Tbilisi	2–0	0–0	0–1		9–2	1–1	4–1	7–2	7–4	0–0	2–2
Kalev Tallinn	1–1	0–0	1–2	2–5		0–2	2–3	0–1	2–2	1–2	0–1
Moldova Chisinau	3–2	0–1	0–0	0–0	2–1		2–5	0–0	1–3	1–2	2–1
Pakhtakor Tashkent	2–0	1–0	1–1	1–2	2–0	3–1		1–1	0–0	0–1	0–5
SKA Rostov-on-Don	5–0	3–1	1–0	1–1	3–1	2–0	4–2		1–1	0–3	3–1
Spartak Yerevan	4–1	1–1	0–4	5–1	3–0	4–0	1–0	3–0		1–1	1–0
Torpedo Moscow	2–1	1–2	1–1	3–2	6–0	2–0	3–1	2–1	3–0		2–3
Zenit Leningrad	2–0	2–2	1–0	0–3	6–0	3–1	4–1	1–2	0–0	1–3	

Legend: Blue = home team win; Yellow = draw; Red = away team win.

=== Subgroup 2 ===
==== Table ====
Pos	Team	Pld	W	D	L	GF	GA	GD	Pts	Qualification
1	(Ukrainian Soviet Socialist Republic) Dynamo Kiev	20	13	2	5	46	23	+23	28	Qualification for Places 1–6 group
2	(Russian Soviet Federative Socialist Republic) Lokomotiv Moscow	20	11	5	4	31	27	+4	27	Qualification for Places 1–6 group
3	(Russian Soviet Federative Socialist Republic) CSKA Moscow	20	12	1	7	38	17	+21	25	Qualification for Places 1–6 group
4	(Russian Soviet Federative Socialist Republic) Spartak Moscow	20	10	4	6	33	18	+15	24	Qualification for Places 7–12 group
5	(Russian Soviet Federative Socialist Republic) Admiralteyets Leningrad	20	7	9	4	34	24	+10	23	Qualification for Places 7–12 group
6	(Byelorussian Soviet Socialist Republic) Belarus Minsk	20	9	4	7	24	27	−3	22	Qualification for Places 7–12 group
7	(Russian Soviet Federative Socialist Republic) Krylia Sovetov Kuybyshev	20	6	6	8	22	26	−4	18	Qualification for Places 13–18 group
8	(Ukrainian Soviet Socialist Republic) Shakhtyor Stalino	20	5	6	9	24	36	−12	16	Qualification for Places 13–18 group
9	(Kazakh Soviet Socialist Republic) Kairat Alma-Ata	20	6	4	10	19	29	−10	16	Qualification for Places 13–18 group
10	(Azerbaijan Soviet Socialist Republic) Neftyanik Baku	20	5	4	11	21	38	−17	14	Qualification for Places 19–22 group
11	(Lithuanian Soviet Socialist Republic) Spartak Vilnius	20	1	5	14	12	39	−27	7	Qualification for Places 19–22 group

Source: rsssf.com

==== Results ====
Home \ Away	ADM	BEL	CSK	DYK	KAI	KRY	LOK	NEF	SHA	SPA	SVL
Admiralteyets Leningrad		1–1	0–0	5–1	0–0	2–2	1–2	6–1	4–3	1–1	1–1
Belarus Minsk	1–1		0–3	2–1	0–2	3–1	0–2	1–1	2–3	0–2	2–1
CSKA Moscow	1–4	2–1		–:+ (Note: Victory awarded to Dynamo Kiev.)	0–1	0–1	5–1	4–1	4–0	2–0	2–0
Dynamo Kiev	2–0	1–2	2–0		3–0	0–3	3–1	3–0	4–1	3–3	6–1
Kairat Alma-Ata	0–0	6–1	0–2	0–5		1–1	1–1	3–2	2–0	0–1	1–0
Krylia Sovetov Kuybyshev	1–2	0–0	0–3	1–2	3–1		0–2	1–1	2–0	1–0	0–0
Lokomotiv Moscow	1–0	0–3	1–6	2–1	2–1	4–1		1–0	1–0	0–0	2–1
Neftyanik Baku	0–2	0–2	2–0	0–3	4–0	0–0	0–4		1–1	0–3	2–0
Shakhtyor Stalino	0–0	0–1	3–0	2–2	2–0	2–1	2–2	3–1		1–3	0–0
Spartak Moscow	4–1	0–1	0–1	0–1	1–0	2–1	1–1	1–2	5–0		3–0
Spartak Vilnius	2–3	0–1	0–3	0–3	1–0	1–2	1–1	0–3	1–1	2–3	

Legend: Blue = home team win; Yellow = draw; Red = away team win.

== Round 2 ==
=== Places 1–6 ===
==== Table ====
Pos	Team	Pld	W	D	L	GF	GA	GD	Pts
1	(Russian Soviet Federative Socialist Republic) Torpedo Moscow (C)	10	6	2	2	17	9	+8	14
2	(Ukrainian Soviet Socialist Republic) Dynamo Kiev	10	5	1	4	19	14	+5	11
3	(Russian Soviet Federative Socialist Republic) Dynamo Moscow	10	5	1	4	12	10	+2	11
4	(Russian Soviet Federative Socialist Republic) SKA Rostov-on-Don	10	2	6	2	13	12	+1	10
5	(Russian Soviet Federative Socialist Republic) Lokomotiv Moscow	10	3	1	6	14	19	−5	7
6	(Russian Soviet Federative Socialist Republic) CSKA Moscow	10	3	1	6	7	18	−11	7

Source: rsssf.com
(C) Champions

==== Results ====
Home \ Away	CSK	DYK	DYN	LOK	SKA	TOR
CSKA Moscow		1–3	0–2	2–1	0–0	0–4
Dynamo Kiev	4–0		1–4	5–2	3–1	1–2
Dynamo Moscow	0–1	1–0		1–0	1–1	0–2
Lokomotiv Moscow	1–2	0–1	4–1		0–4	2–1
SKA Rostov-on-Don	2–1	1–1	0–2	1–1		2–2
Torpedo Moscow	1–0	2–0	1–0	1–3	1–1	

Legend: Blue = home team win; Yellow = draw; Red = away team win.

=== Places 7–12 ===
==== Table ====
Pos	Team	Pld	W	D	L	GF	GA	GD	Pts
7	(Russian Soviet Federative Socialist Republic) Spartak Moscow	10	5	3	2	19	14	+5	13
8	(Georgian Soviet Socialist Republic) Dynamo Tbilisi	10	5	2	3	18	12	+6	12
9	(Armenian Soviet Socialist Republic) Ararat Yerevan	10	4	3	3	11	12	−1	11
10	(Russian Soviet Federative Socialist Republic) Admiralteyets Leningrad	10	4	1	5	17	15	+2	9
11	(Byelorussian Soviet Socialist Republic) Belarus Minsk	10	4	1	5	8	12	−4	9
12	(Latvian Soviet Socialist Republic) Daugava Riga	10	1	4	5	10	18	−8	6

Source: rsssf.com

==== Results ====
Home \ Away	ADM	BEL	DAU	DTB	SPA	SYE
Admiralteyets Leningrad		3–0	3–1	0–1	3–3	3–1
Belarus Minsk	2–1		1–0	1–0	1–2	0–0
Daugava Riga	3–1	1–2		1–1	0–0	0–0
Dynamo Tbilisi	3–2	1–0	6–2		1–2	3–0
Spartak Moscow	0–1	2–1	3–1	2–2		4–0
Spartak Yerevan	1–0	2–0	1–1	2–0	4–1	

Legend: Blue = home team win; Yellow = draw; Red = away team win.

=== Places 13–18 ===
==== Table ====
Pos	Team	Pld	W	D	L	GF	GA	GD	Pts	Relegation
13	(Ukrainian Soviet Socialist Republic) Avangard Kharkiv	10	4	4	2	11	5	+6	12	
14	(Uzbek Soviet Socialist Republic) Pakhtakor Tashkent	10	4	3	3	11	9	+2	11	
15	(Russian Soviet Federative Socialist Republic) Zenit Leningrad	10	5	1	4	13	12	+1	11	
16	(Russian Soviet Federative Socialist Republic) Krylia Sovetov Kuybyshev (Note: Krylia Sovetov Kuybyshev were relegated because they were a worst ranked team from Russia.) (R)	10	4	2	4	15	13	+2	10	Relegation to Class B
17	(Ukrainian Soviet Socialist Republic) Shakhtyor Stalino (Note: Shakhtyor Stalino played a relegation play-out match because they were a worst ranked team from Ukraine.) (O)	10	4	2	4	10	12	−2	10	Qualification for relegation play-off
18	(Kazakh Soviet Socialist Republic) Kairat Almaty	10	3	0	7	6	15	−9	6	

Source: rsssf.com
(O) Play-off winners; (R) Relegated

==== Results ====
Home \ Away	AVA	KAI	KRY	PAK	SHA	ZEN
Avangard Kharkiv		2–0	0–0	4–0	3–0	0–0
Kairat Alma-Ata	0–1		2–3	1–0	1–0	0–1
Krylia Sovetov Kuybyshev	3–0	0–1		1–0	4–2	0–1
Pakhtakor Tashkent	0–0	3–0	1–1		2–0	2–0
Shakhtyor Stalino	1–1	3–0	1–0	0–0		2–1
Zenit Leningrad	1–0	2–1	5–3	2–3	0–1	

Legend: Blue = home team win; Yellow = draw; Red = away team win.

=== Places 19–22 ===
==== Table ====
Pos	Team	Pld	W	D	L	GF	GA	GD	Pts
19	(Estonian Soviet Socialist Republic) Kalev Tallinn	6	2	3	1	8	11	−3	7
20	(Lithuanian Soviet Socialist Republic) Spartak Vilnius	6	1	4	1	8	8	0	6
21	(Azerbaijan Soviet Socialist Republic) Neftyanik Baku	6	2	2	2	6	7	−1	6
22	(Moldavian Soviet Socialist Republic) Moldova Kishinyov	6	1	3	2	10	6	+4	5

Source: rsssf.com

==== Results ====
Home \ Away	KAL	MOL	NEF	SVL
Kalev Tallinn		2–2	1–0	2–2
Moldova Chisinau	6–0		0–1	1–1
Neftyanik Baku	0–2	1–1		2–1
Spartak Vilnius	1–1	1–0	2–2	

Legend: Blue = home team win; Yellow = draw; Red = away team win.

=== Top scorers ===
20 goals

- Zaur Kaloyev (Dinamo Tbilisi)

19 goals

- Gennady Krasnitsky (Pakhtakor Tashkent)

17 goals

- Viktor Sokolov (Lokomotiv Moscow)

13 goals

- Anatoli Ilyin (Spartak Moscow)
- Tengiz Melashvili (Dinamo Tbilisi)

12 goals

- Feliks Arutyunyan (Spartak Yerevan)
- Igor Chislenko (Dinamo Moscow)
- Gennadi Gusarov (Torpedo Moscow)
- Aleksei Levchenko (SKA Rostov-on-Don)
- Valery Lobanovsky (Dynamo Kyiv)
- Vladimir Streshny (CSKA Moscow)
- Anatoli Vasilyev (Admiralteyets Leningrad)

=== Promotion/relegation play-off ===
Team 1	Agg.	Team 2	1st leg	2nd leg
Shakhtyor Stalino	2–1	Metalurh Zaporizhia	2–0	0–1
