= 1962 Soviet Top League =

24th season of top-tier football league in Soviet Union

Soviet Top League
- Season: 1962

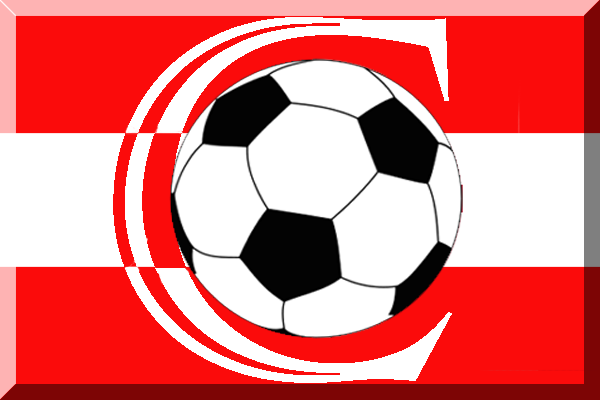
FK Spartak Moscow flag

22 teams took part in the league with FC Spartak Moscow winning the championship.

== Round 1 ==
=== Group A ===
==== Table ====
Pos	Team	Pld	W	D	L	GF	GA	GD	Pts	Qualification
1	(Ukrainian Soviet Socialist Republic) Dynamo Kyiv	20	14	5	1	44	20	+24	33	Qualification for Places 1–12 group
2	(Russian Soviet Federative Socialist Republic) CSKA Moscow	20	10	8	2	28	9	+19	28	Qualification for Places 1–12 group
3	(Ukrainian Soviet Socialist Republic) Shakhtar Donetsk	20	10	5	5	34	22	+12	25	Qualification for Places 1–12 group
4	(Russian Soviet Federative Socialist Republic) Zenit Leningrad	20	8	5	7	34	24	+10	21	Qualification for Places 1–12 group
5	(Moldavian Soviet Socialist Republic) Moldova Chișinău	20	8	5	7	27	25	+2	21	Qualification for Places 1–12 group
6	(Russian Soviet Federative Socialist Republic) SKA Rostov-on-Don	20	6	8	6	34	28	+6	20	Qualification for Places 1–12 group
7	(Kazakh Soviet Socialist Republic) Kairat Almaty	20	6	8	6	20	22	−2	20	Qualification for Places 13–22 group
8	(Russian Soviet Federative Socialist Republic) Lokomotiv Moscow	20	5	5	10	21	32	−11	15	Qualification for Places 13–22 group
9	(Latvian Soviet Socialist Republic) Daugava Rīga	20	5	3	12	17	30	−13	13	Qualification for Places 13–22 group
10	(Armenian Soviet Socialist Republic) Spartak Yerevan	20	5	3	12	19	36	−17	13	Qualification for Places 13–22 group
11	(Lithuanian Soviet Socialist Republic) Žalgiris Vilnius	20	1	9	10	12	42	−30	11	Qualification for Places 13–22 group

Source: rsssf.com

==== Results ====
Home \ Away	DAU	DYK	CSK	KAI	LOK	MOL	SHA	SKA	SYE	ŽAL	ZEN
Daugava Rīga		0–1	0–0	2–0	1–2	0–4	2–0	0–1	2–0	2–0	1–4
Dynamo Kyiv	3–1		1–0	1–0	3–0	3–2	1–1	2–1	8–1	1–0	2–1
CSKA Moscow	1–0	2–2		0–3	4–0	1–0	0–0	2–0	1–0	7–0	4–0
Kairat Alma-Ata	0–0	0–0	0–0		0–0	2–1	2–1	2–0	2–2	2–2	2–1
Lokomotiv Moscow	1–1	2–3	1–1	2–0		1–2	1–2	3–0	2–1	0–0	0–2
Moldova Chișinău	1–0	0–4	0–1	1–1	2–1		3–1	1–1	2–0	1–0	0–0
Shakhtar Donetsk	3–2	3–0	0–1	2–1	3–1	1–0		2–2	3–0	6–0	0–2
SKA Rostov-on-Don	4–0	2–2	1–1	6–1	3–1	1–1	3–3		1–2	3–0	2–1
Spartak Yerevan	1–0	1–2	0–1	0–0	2–3	3–1	0–1	2–1		2–2	0–2
Žalgiris Vilnius	1–2	2–4	0–0	1–0	0–0	1–1	1–1	1–1	0–1		1–1
Zenit Leningrad	3–1	1–1	1–1	0–2	2–0	3–4	0–1	1–1	2–1	7–0	

Legend: Blue = home team win; Yellow = draw; Red = away team win.

=== Group B ===
==== Table ====
Pos	Team	Pld	W	D	L	GF	GA	GD	Pts	Qualification
1	(Georgian Soviet Socialist Republic) Dinamo Tbilisi	20	10	7	3	31	17	+14	27	Qualification for Places 1–12 group
2	(Russian Soviet Federative Socialist Republic) Spartak Moscow	20	11	3	6	38	21	+17	25	Qualification for Places 1–12 group
3	(Russian Soviet Federative Socialist Republic) Dynamo Moscow	20	9	6	5	27	18	+9	24	Qualification for Places 1–12 group
4	(Russian Soviet Federative Socialist Republic) Torpedo Moscow	20	9	5	6	40	23	+17	23	Qualification for Places 1–12 group
5	(Uzbek Soviet Socialist Republic) Pakhtakor Tashkent	20	8	7	5	24	22	+2	23	Qualification for Places 1–12 group
6	(Azerbaijan Soviet Socialist Republic) Neftyanik Baku	20	7	7	6	26	24	+2	21	Qualification for Places 1–12 group
7	(Ukrainian Soviet Socialist Republic) Avangard Kharkov	20	7	3	10	16	26	−10	17	Qualification for Places 13–22 group
8	(Georgian Soviet Socialist Republic) Torpedo Kutaisi	20	6	5	9	22	35	−13	17	Qualification for Places 13–22 group
9	(Byelorussian Soviet Socialist Republic) Belarus Minsk	20	6	4	10	20	25	−5	16	Qualification for Places 13–22 group
10	(Russian Soviet Federative Socialist Republic) Krylya Sovetov Kuybyshev	20	5	4	11	22	31	−9	14	Qualification for Places 13–22 group
11	(Russian Soviet Federative Socialist Republic) Dynamo Leningrad	20	4	5	11	14	38	−24	13	Qualification for Places 13–22 group

Source: rsssf.com

==== Results ====
Home \ Away	AVA	BEL	DLE	DYN	DTB	KRY	NEF	PAK	TKU	TOR	SPA
Avangard Kharkov		1–0	0–0	1–0	1–2	1–0	3–0	2–1	1–0	0–1	0–0
Belarus Minsk	0–1		2–2	0–2	2–1	3–1	2–0	0–1	1–1	2–0	0–1
Dynamo Leningrad	1–0	0–0		0–2	2–1	3–1	0–1	0–2	1–1	2–4	1–0
Dynamo Moscow	2–1	0–2	4–0		0–0	1–1	4–2	1–1	0–1	1–0	2–0
Dinamo Tbilisi	4–1	3–2	1–0	1–1		1–0	0–0	4–0	0–0	1–1	2–1
Krylya Sovetov Kuybyshev	3–1	0–1	0–0	3–1	1–1		1–0	0–0	3–0	0–3	2–1
Neftyanik Baku	4–0	2–1	5–0	0–0	1–1	2–1		0–0	4–0	0–0	2–2
Pakhtakor Tashkent	0–0	3–1	1–0	2–2	2–0	2–1	1–3		1–0	0–0	2–3
Torpedo Kutaisi	4–1	0–0	2–1	0–1	1–3	3–2	0–0	2–1		4–2	0–3
Torpedo Moscow	1–0	4–0	7–1	2–3	1–3	1–0	5–0	1–1	6–3		0–1
Spartak Moscow	3–1	2–1	4–0	1–0	0–2	6–2	3–0	2–3	4–0	1–1	

Legend: Blue = home team win; Yellow = draw; Red = away team win.

== Round 2 ==
=== Places 1–12 ===
==== Table ====
Pos	Team	Pld	W	D	L	GF	GA	GD	Pts
1	(Russian Soviet Federative Socialist Republic) Spartak Moscow (C)	22	14	4	4	37	18	+19	32
2	(Russian Soviet Federative Socialist Republic) Dynamo Moscow	22	10	9	3	28	14	+14	29
3	(Georgian Soviet Socialist Republic) Dinamo Tbilisi	22	10	8	4	29	20	+9	28
4	(Russian Soviet Federative Socialist Republic) CSKA Moscow	22	9	8	5	24	18	+6	26
5	(Ukrainian Soviet Socialist Republic) Dynamo Kyiv	22	8	9	5	36	28	+8	25
6	(Uzbek Soviet Socialist Republic) Pakhtakor Tashkent	22	9	5	8	24	33	−9	23
7	(Russian Soviet Federative Socialist Republic) Torpedo Moscow	22	7	8	7	35	30	+5	22
8	(Ukrainian Soviet Socialist Republic) Shakhtar Donetsk	22	8	6	8	25	25	0	22
9	(Russian Soviet Federative Socialist Republic) SKA Rostov-on-Don	22	4	9	9	25	37	−12	17
10	(Azerbaijan Soviet Socialist Republic) Neftyanik Baku	22	2	11	9	19	39	−20	15
11	(Russian Soviet Federative Socialist Republic) Zenit Leningrad	22	4	6	12	29	34	−5	14
12	(Moldavian Soviet Socialist Republic) Moldova Chișinău	22	3	5	14	20	35	−15	11

Source: rsssf.com
(C) Champions

==== Results ====
Home \ Away	CSK	DYK	DYN	DTB	MOL	PAK	NEF	SHA	SKA	SPA	TOR	ZEN
CSKA Moscow			0–0	2–1		0–1	3–2			0–0	1–3	
Dynamo Kyiv			1–0	1–1		5–0	4–1			0–2	2–2	
Dynamo Moscow	0–0	2–0			2–0			1–2	1–0			3–0
Dinamo Tbilisi	0–1	1–1			2–0			2–0	3–1			2–1
Moldova Chișinău			0–2	0–1		1–2	0–0			0–2	5–1	
Pakhtakor Tashkent	0–2	1–0			2–1			2–1	0–3			2–1
Neftyanik Baku	1–1	1–1			1–1			0–2	2–1			1–1
Shakhtar Donetsk			0–0	1–1		0–1	3–1			0–1	3–0	
SKA Rostov-on-Don			1–1	0–1		1–0	1–0			1–6	1–3	
Spartak Moscow	1–0	2–1			1–0			4–0	0–0			1–0
Torpedo Moscow	4–1	2–2			3–1			0–1	4–1			1–0
Zenit Leningrad			1–2	5–0		2–1	5–1			2–3	1–1	

Legend: Blue = home team win; Yellow = draw; Red = away team win.

=== Places 13–22 ===
==== Table ====
Pos	Team	Pld	W	D	L	GF	GA	GD	Pts	Relegation
13	(Russian Soviet Federative Socialist Republic) Lokomotiv Moscow	18	7	8	3	27	18	+9	22	
14	(Ukrainian Soviet Socialist Republic) Avangard Kharkov	18	8	5	5	21	17	+4	21	
15	(Georgian Soviet Socialist Republic) FC Torpedo Kutaisi	18	7	5	6	21	16	+5	19	
16	(Russian Soviet Federative Socialist Republic) Dynamo Leningrad	18	6	6	6	21	17	+4	18	
17	(Russian Soviet Federative Socialist Republic) Krylya Sovetov Kuybyshev	18	8	2	8	27	25	+2	18	
18	(Armenian Soviet Socialist Republic) Spartak Yerevan	18	7	4	7	23	23	0	18	
19	(Byelorussian Soviet Socialist Republic) Belarus Minsk	18	6	6	6	21	22	−1	18	
20	(Kazakh Soviet Socialist Republic) Kairat Alma-Ata	18	5	7	6	14	14	0	17	
21	(Latvian Soviet Socialist Republic) Daugava Rīga (R)	18	6	4	8	14	20	−6	16	Relegation to Class A Second Group
22	(Lithuanian Soviet Socialist Republic) Žalgiris Vilnius (R)	18	4	5	9	16	33	−17	13	Relegation to Class A Second Group

Source: rsssf.com
(R) Relegated

==== Results ====
Home \ Away	AVA	BEL	DAU	DLE	KAI	KRY	LOK	SYE	TKU	ŽAL
Avangard Kharkov			3–0		2–0		2–2	2–0		3–0
Belarus Minsk			3–0		1–0		0–0	4–2		1–2
Daugava Rīga	1–1	0–0		2–0		0–2			1–0	
Dynamo Leningrad			3–0		0–0		2–1	1–0		4–0
Kairat Alma-Ata	0–0	2–0		2–1		4–0			1–0	
Krylya Sovetov Kuybyshev			1–0		1–0		2–1	2–0		6–1
Lokomotiv Moscow	2–0	7–2		4–2		0–0			0–3	
Spartak Yerevan	3–1	2–1		1–0		4–1			2–0	
Torpedo Kutaisi			2–0		0–1		0–0	0–0		2–1
Žalgiris Vilnius	1–1	1–2		1–0		3–2			0–3	

Legend: Blue = home team win; Yellow = draw; Red = away team win.

=== Top scorers ===
17 goals

- Mikhail Mustygin (Belarus Minsk)

16 goals

- Boris Kazakov (Krylia Sovetov Kuybyshev)
- Eduard Markarov (Neftyanik Baku)
- Yuri Sevidov (Spartak Moscow)

15 goals

- Gennadi Gusarov (Torpedo Moscow)

14 goals

- Gennadi Matveyev (SKA Rostov-on-Don)

13 goals

- Zaur Kaloyev (Dinamo Tbilisi)
- Nemesio Pozuelo (Torpedo Moscow)

12 goals

- Lev Burchalkin (Zenit Leningrad)

11 goals

- Andriy Biba (Dynamo Kyiv)
- Oleg Kopayev (SKA Rostov-on-Don)
- Vitali Savelyev (Shakhtyor Donetsk)
