= Vladimir Dolbonosov (footballer, born 1970) =

Soviet and Russian footballer

Personal information
- Full name: Vladimir Vladimirovich Dolbonosov
- Date of birth: 1 April 1970 (age 56)
- Place of birth: Moscow, Russia
- Height: 1.77 m (5 ft 9 1/2 in)
- Position: Midfielder

Senior career*
Years	Team	Apps	(Gls)
1986	FC Dynamo Moscow (reserves)	?	(1)
1987	FC Dynamo-2 Moscow	1	(0)
1988	FC Dynamo Moscow	0	(0)
1989–1990	FC Dynamo-2 Moscow	6	(0)
1990–1991	FC Dynamo Moscow	1	(0)
1991–1992	FC Dynamo-Gazovik Tyumen	57	(7)
1993	Teltower FV 1913		
1993–1996	FC Dynamo-Gazovik Tyumen	108	(11)
1997	FC Saturn Ramenskoye	14	(2)
1997–1998	FC Tyumen	21	(0)
- * Club domestic league appearances and goals

Vladimir Vladimirovich Dolbonosov (Russian: Владимир Владимирович Долбоносов; born 1 April 1970) is a former Soviet and Russian professional footballer.

== Club career ==
He made his debut in the Soviet Top League in 1991 for FC Dynamo Moscow.
