= Nikita Simonyan =

Russian football player and coach (1926–2025)

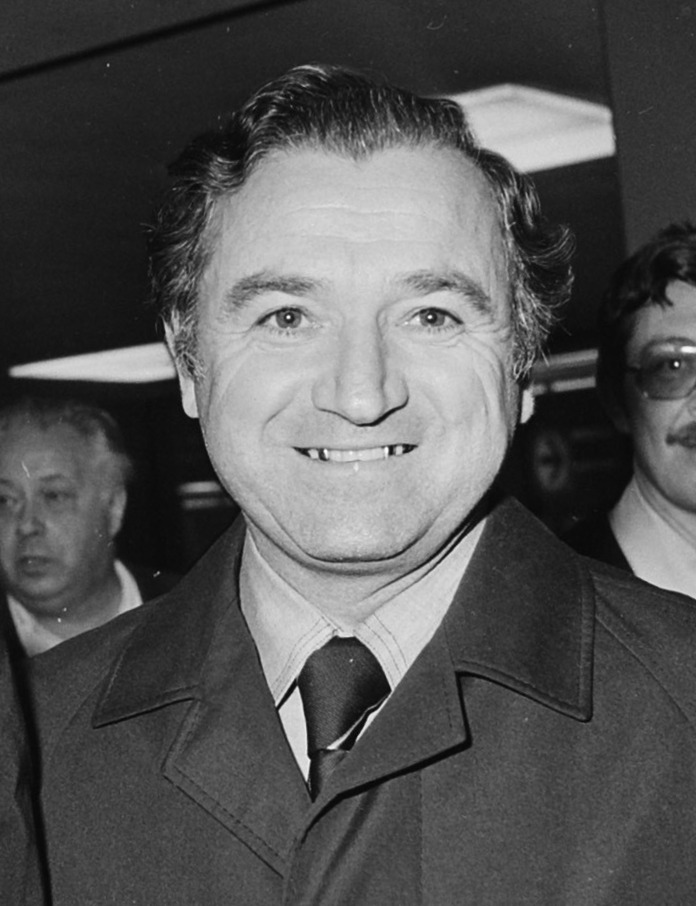
- Simonyan in 1977

Personal information
- Full name: Nikita Pavlovich Simonyan
- Date of birth: 12 October 1926
- Place of birth: Armavir, North Caucasus Krai, Russian SFSR, USSR
- Date of death: 23 November 2025 (aged 99)
- Height: 1.72 m (5 ft 8 in)
- Position: Forward

Youth career
- Dynamo Sukhumi

Senior career*
Years	Team	Apps	(Gls)
1946–1948	Krylya Sovetov Moscow	52	(9)
1949–1959	Spartak Moscow	233	(133)
Total		285	(142)

International career
1954–1958	USSR	20	(10)

Managerial career
- 1960–1965: Spartak Moscow
- 1963: USSR
- 1964: USSR
- 1967–1972: Spartak Moscow
- 1973–1974: Ararat Yerevan
- 1977–1979: USSR
- 1980–1981: Chornomorets
- 1984–1985: Ararat Yerevan
- 1988: USSR
Medal record
Soviet Union
Gold medal – first place	Olympic Games	1956
- * Club domestic league appearances and goals

Nikita Pavlovich Simonyan (Russian: Никита Павлович Симонян, Armenian: Նիկիտա Պողոսի Սիմոնյան; 12 October 1926 – 23 November 2025) was a Soviet and Russian football striker and coach of Armenian descent. He spent most of his career at Spartak Moscow, where he was top scorer of all time with 160 goals. He played for the Soviet Union national team, winning the gold medal at the 1956 Olympics and reaching the quarter-finals of the 1958 FIFA World Cup. As a manager, he won the Soviet Top League with Ararat Yerevan in 1973.

Simonyan was the Russian football functionary First Vice-president of the Russian Football Union. He was awarded the Honoured Master of Sports of the USSR title in 1954, the Honored Coach of RSFSR title in 1968, the Merited Coach of the USSR title in 1970 and the Order "For Merit to the Fatherland" in 2011.

== Early life ==
Simonyan was born with the Armenian name Mkrtich (Մկրտիչ), but was given the Russian name Nikita by friends. He was known as Nikita for the rest of his life, including in Armenia. When he was four, he settled in Abkhazia, where his father was a cobbler.

== Club career ==
Simonyan was a player for Dynamo Sukhumi during his youth career. After sixteen years of living in Sukhumi, he moved to Moscow, where he joined the local club Krylya Sovetov Moscow, also known as the "Wings of the Soviets". Gorokhov became Simonyan's first coach in Moscow.

After Krylya Sovetov Moscow came in last place at the 1948 Soviet Top League, the club was disbanded. Simonyan signed with Spartak Moscow in 1949. In his first year, Spartak Moscow came in third place at the 1949 Soviet Top League. Simonyan and Spartak finally achieved victory in the 1952 Soviet Top League. He made 233 appearances and scored 133 goals for Spartak in his career.

== International career ==
Simonyan made his debut for the Soviet Union national team in 1954. He competed with the team at the 1956 Summer Olympics in Melbourne, where the team won the gold medal in football.

Simonyan was a member of the Soviet football team at the 1958 FIFA World Cup, its first World Cup. Because Igor Netto was unable to play due to injury for most of the World Cup, Simonyan was named captain of the team in his place. He scored in a 2–2 draw with England as the Soviets advanced from a group also including Austria and Brazil; the Soviets were eliminated by hosts Sweden in the quarter-finals. Due to high hopes since winning the Olympic gold, the performance was considered a failure by the Communist Party of the Soviet Union.

Simonyan played his last match on 19 June 1958. Out of 20 internationals for the team, he scored 10 goals.

== Managerial career ==
After retiring from football as a player, Simonyan became the manager and head coach of Spartak Moscow in 1960. After he and Spartak won the 1965 Soviet Cup, Simonyan stopped managing the club. He started managing Spartak again in 1967. Spartak made it to the Top League finals again in 1968 but did not win. The club won the 1969 Soviet Top League, their second Top League title with Simonyan as head coach and manager. Simonyan and Spartak won the 1971 Soviet Cup. Simonyan stopped managing Spartak for good in 1972.

Simonyan, an Armenian himself, began managing and coaching Armenian club Ararat Yerevan in 1973. He led the club to victory at 1973 Soviet Top League. Ararat Yerevan won the 1973 Soviet Cup as well that year. Under Simonyan, the club won its first Soviet titles. Simonyan stopped leading the club in 1974. He came back to Ararat Yerevan in 1984 and stopped managing for good in 1985.

== Administrative career ==
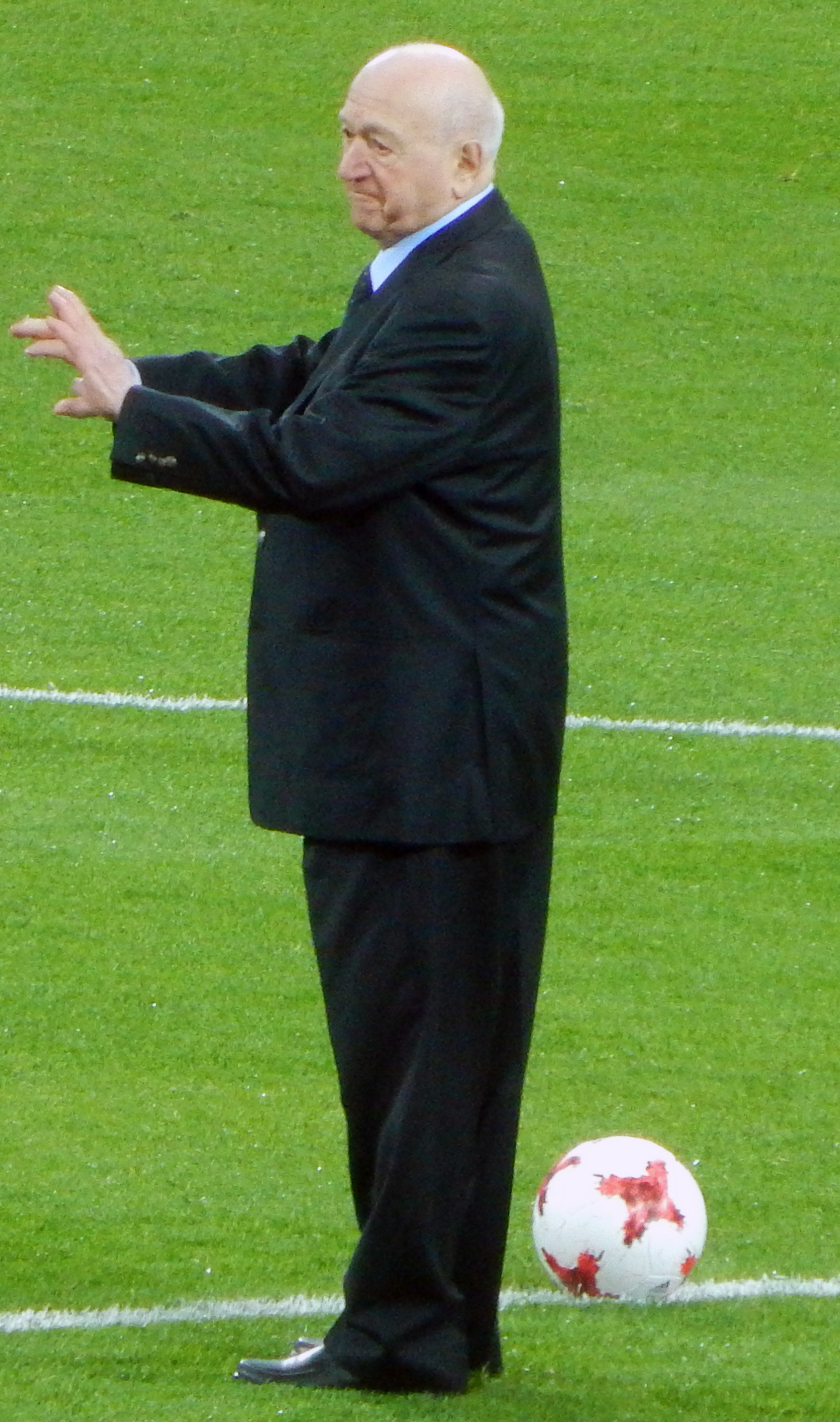
At the opening of the Fisht Stadium in 2017

Simonyan later worked in senior positions at the Football Federation of the Soviet Union, Sports Committee of the USSR and the Russian Football Union. On 24 November 2009, he was appointed acting president of the Russian Football Union following the resignation of Vitaly Mutko. He was in office until 3 February 2010. At a special conference of the Russian Football Union, Sergey Fursenko was chosen as the new president on 3 February.

Simonyan was in attendance for the UEFA Euro 2012 match between Russia and Armenia in Yerevan, which ended in a draw. On 25 March 2011, the day before the match, Armenian President Serzh Sargsyan awarded Simonyan the "Medal of Honor." At the award ceremony, Simonyan said:

I am honored to receive this esteemed award. You know, I'm one hundred percent Armenian. My parents, being Armenians from Artvin, once escaped from the genocide. My father was a great patriot. For me it was a great honor to lead the national team in 1973, "Ararat." And what did these guys win the title and the cup for me, as a coach, was a holiday. You can not pass, as it responded to the people. Indeed, it was a great team. So I'm a generation, and of course, all our people just grateful and worship.

After Sergey Fursenko resigned on 25 June 2012, Simonyan was appointed acting president of the Russian Football Union for a second time. He left office on 3 September 2012, when Nikolai Tolstykh was elected president of the Russian Football Union.

Simonyan, along with fellow Spartak veteran Alexander Mirzoyan, sent well wishes to Armenian Yura Movsisyan who joined Spartak in December 2012. On 19 February 2013, Simonyan attended the grand opening of the new Spartak arena. He reminisced that if he were 20 years younger, he would be happy to still play for the club.

== Later life and death ==
In October 2025, following the death of Charles Coste, Simonyan became the oldest living Olympic champion. He died in the evening on 23 November 2025, at the age of 99. His colleague, Vyacheslav Koloskov, stated that Simonyan had continued working until his very final days: on Thursday of 20 November he was, as usual, in the RFU office and had stayed there till 15 o'clock; later that day he broke his leg and was hospitalized. He was the last surviving player from the Soviet Union's both 1956 Olympic football team and 1958 World Cup team.

== Honours ==
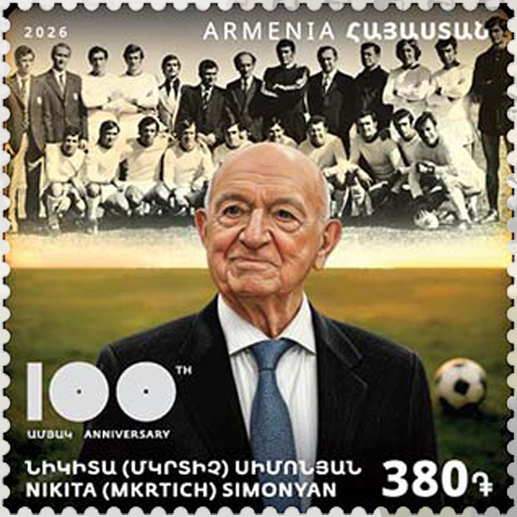
Simonyan on a 2026 stamp of Armenia

=== Player ===
Spartak Moscow

- Soviet Top League: 1952, 1953, 1956, 1958
- Soviet Cup: 1950, 1958

Soviet Union

- Olympic Games Gold Medal: 1956

=== Manager ===
Spartak Moscow

- Soviet Top League: 1962, 1969
- Soviet Cup: 1963, 1965, 1971

Ararat Yerevan

- Soviet Top League: 1973
- Soviet Cup: 1973

=== Individual ===
- Order "For Merit to the Fatherland", 3rd class (2000)

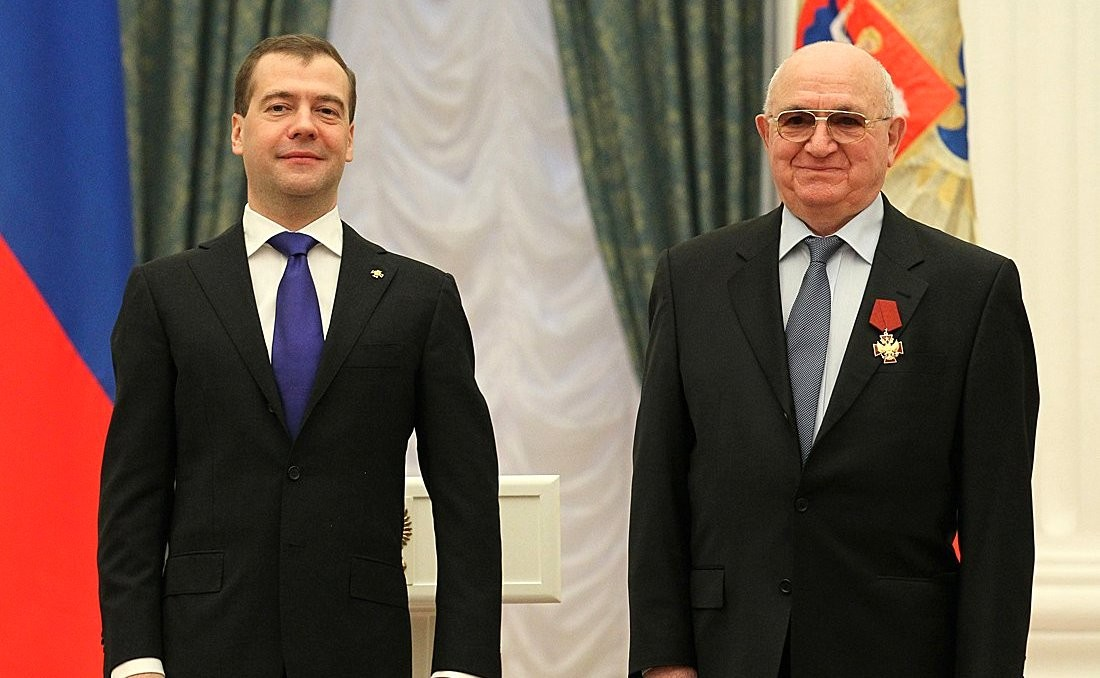
Presentation of the Order "For Merit to the Fatherland', 4th class (29 December 2011)

- Order "For Merit to the Fatherland", 4th class (2011)
- Order of Friendship (1995)
- Order of the Red Banner of Labour (1957)
- Order of the Badge of Honour (1971)
- Jubilee Medal "In Commemoration of the 100th Anniversary of the Birth of Vladimir Ilyich Lenin"
- Medal "Veteran of Labour"

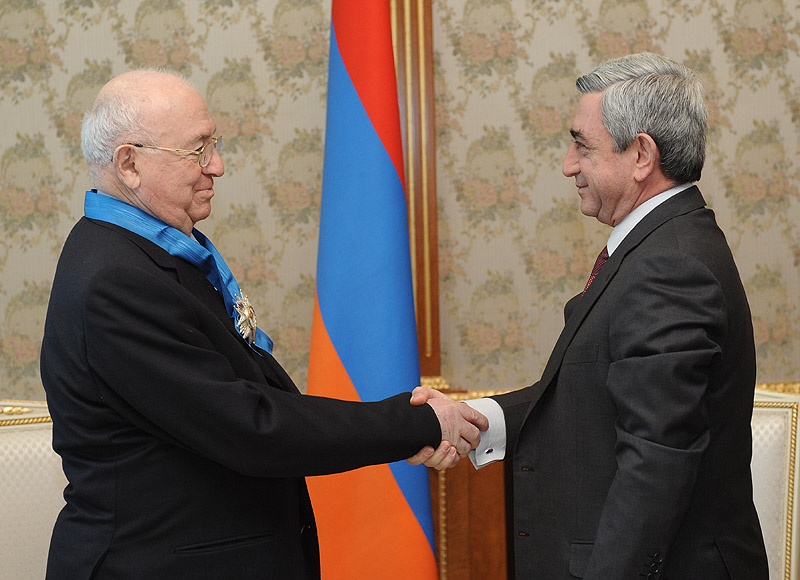
Presentation of the Armenian Order of Honour with President Serzh Sargsyan (25 March 2011)

- Movses Khorenatsi Medal
- Olympic Order
- Soviet Top League top goalscorer: 1949 (26 goals), 1950 (34 goals), 1953 (14 goals)
