= 1965 Soviet Top League =

28th season of top-tier football league in Soviet Union

Soviet Top League
- Season: 1965

- 17 teams took part in the league with FC Torpedo Moscow winning the championship.
- FC Torpedo Moscow qualified for Champions Cup 1966–67 and FC Spartak Moscow qualified for CWC 1966–67.

== League standings ==
Pos	Team	Pld	W	D	L	GF	GA	GD	Pts	Qualification
1	(Russian Soviet Federative Socialist Republic) Torpedo Moscow (C)	32	22	7	3	55	21	+34	51	Qualification for European Cup first round
2	(Ukrainian Soviet Socialist Republic) Dynamo Kyiv	32	22	6	4	58	22	+36	50	
3	(Russian Soviet Federative Socialist Republic) CSKA Moscow	32	14	10	8	38	24	+14	38	
4	(Byelorussian Soviet Socialist Republic) Dinamo Minsk	32	14	9	9	37	27	+10	37	
5	(Russian Soviet Federative Socialist Republic) Dynamo Moscow	32	11	14	7	38	24	+14	36	
6	(Georgian Soviet Socialist Republic) Dinamo Tbilisi	32	12	12	8	37	30	+7	36	
7	(Russian Soviet Federative Socialist Republic) SKA Rostov-on-Don	32	10	14	8	42	35	+7	34	
8	(Russian Soviet Federative Socialist Republic) Spartak Moscow	32	10	12	10	28	26	+2	32	Qualification for Cup Winners' Cup first round
9	(Russian Soviet Federative Socialist Republic) Zenit Leningrad	32	10	12	10	32	32	0	32	
10	(Uzbek Soviet Socialist Republic) Pakhtakor Tashkent	32	10	12	10	34	40	−6	32	
11	(Azerbaijan Soviet Socialist Republic) Neftyanik Baku	32	11	8	13	32	33	−1	30	
12	(Ukrainian Soviet Socialist Republic) Shakhtar Donetsk	32	7	14	11	29	34	−5	28	
13	(Russian Soviet Federative Socialist Republic) Krylya Sovetov Kuybyshev	32	9	9	14	34	44	−10	27	
14	(Ukrainian Soviet Socialist Republic) Chornomorets Odessa	32	9	8	15	35	43	−8	26	
15	(Russian Soviet Federative Socialist Republic) Lokomotiv Moscow	32	8	8	16	37	48	−11	24	
16	(Georgian Soviet Socialist Republic) Torpedo Kutaisi	32	8	3	21	29	69	−40	19	
17	(Ukrainian Soviet Socialist Republic) SKA Odessa	32	3	6	23	22	65	−43	12	

Source: rsssf.com
(C) Champions

== Results ==
Home \ Away	CHO	CSK	DYK	DMN	DYN	DTB	KRY	LOK	NEF	PAK	SHA	SKA	SKO	SPA	TKU	TOR	ZEN
Chernomorets Odessa		0–2	2–2	0–2	0–0	1–1	3–2	3–3	4–0	0–1	2–1	2–2	2–0	0–2	4–1	1–2	0–0
CSKA Moscow	0–1		2–1	3–1	1–0	1–0	0–0	2–0	3–1	0–0	1–0	2–0	3–2	1–1	3–0	0–0	1–1
Dynamo Kyiv	1–0	1–1		3–0	1–0	2–1	2–0	1–0	3–0	3–2	3–1	3–2	3–0	0–0	4–0	3–2	2–0
Dinamo Minsk	2–1	1–0	0–1		0–0	1–0	1–0	0–0	2–1	3–0	0–0	0–1	2–0	0–0	4–0	1–3	0–0
Dynamo Moscow	2–0	1–1	0–0	0–0		0–0	3–0	5–1	0–0	1–2	1–0	1–1	4–1	0–2	3–0	3–1	3–0
Dinamo Tbilisi	3–2	2–1	0–2	1–1	1–2		2–0	2–1	1–0	0–0	1–1	0–2	1–0	2–1	2–0	1–1	1–2
Krylya Sovetov Kuybyshev	2–1	0–1	0–1	1–2	0–0	0–1		1–0	3–1	2–2	3–1	1–1	4–0	1–0	5–0	0–0	2–1
Lokomotiv Moscow	0–0	1–0	1–4	1–4	3–1	0–1	0–0		0–0	0–2	0–1	1–3	2–0	2–3	2–0	1–3	2–0
Neftyanik Baku	2–0	0–2	2–2	0–1	0–0	0–0	5–0	1–1		0–1	3–1	1–0	3–2	0–2	3–0	3–0	1–0
Pakhtakor Tashkent	1–2	2–0	1–2	1–1	2–0	2–2	2–3	2–2	2–0		0–0	1–1	1–1	1–0	2–1	0–0	0–1
Shakhtar Donetsk	0–1	0–0	3–2	1–1	1–1	0–0	1–1	2–0	0–0	4–1		0–0	1–3	0–0	2–0	0–3	1–0
SKA Rostov-on-Don	1–1	1–0	0–2	3–0	1–1	3–2	4–0	1–1	0–1	1–0	1–1		2–1	1–1	3–1	0–1	1–1
SKA Odessa	0–1	0–3	0–2	1–3	1–1	0–3	1–1	1–3	0–1	0–0	3–2	2–1		0–2	0–0	0–2	0–1
Spartak Moscow	1–0	1–1	0–2	1–0	0–1	1–1	1–0	1–0	0–2	0–0	2–2	1–1	2–2		2–0	0–2	0–1
Torpedo Kutaisi	1–0	4–2	1–0	0–2	0–2	0–2	4–1	1–5	1–0	4–0	0–2	2–2	4–1	1–1		1–3	2–0
Torpedo Moscow	1–0	1–0	1–0	2–1	3–1	1–1	2–0	3–2	1–1	4–0	1–0	2–0	2–0	1–0	5–0		1–1
Zenit Leningrad	5–1	1–1	0–0	2–1	1–1	2–2	1–1	0–2	1–0	2–3	0–0	2–2	3–0	1–0	2–0	0–1	

Legend: Blue = home team win; Yellow = draw; Red = away team win.

== Top scorers ==
18 goals

- Oleg Kopayev (SKA Rostov-on-Don)

17 goals

- Eduard Malofeyev (Dinamo Minsk)

15 goals

- Boris Kazakov (CSKA Moscow)

13 goals

- Lev Gorshkov (Lokomotiv Moscow)
- Gennadi Krasnitsky (Pakhtakor)

12 goals

- Eduard Streltsov (Torpedo Moscow)

11 goals

- Mikhail Mustygin (Dinamo Minsk)
- Viktor Serebryanikov (Dynamo Kyiv)

10 goals

- Andriy Biba (Dynamo Kyiv)
- Dzhumber Khazhaliya (Torpedo Kutaisi)
- Vitaly Khmelnitsky (Dynamo Kyiv)
- Valeri Lobanovsky (Chornomorets)
- Eduard Markarov (Neftyanik)
- Ishtvan Sekech (SKA Odessa)
