= Mikhail Mustygin =

Soviet Russian footballer (1937–2023)

- Mustygin in 2007

Personal information
- Full name: Mikhail Mikhailovich Mustygin
- Date of birth: 27 October 1937
- Place of birth: Kolomna, Moscow Oblast, Russian SFSR, USSR
- Date of death: 27 January 2023 (aged 85)
- Place of death: Belarus
- Height: 1.68 m (5 ft 6 in)
- Position: Striker

Youth career
- Avangard Kolomna

Senior career*
Years	Team	Apps	(Gls)
1955–1956	Avangard Kolomna		
1956	Stupino		
1957–1958	Avangard Kolomna		
1959–1960	CSK Moscow	14	(0)
1961–1968	Dinamo Minsk	234	(89)
1977	Dinamo-2 Minsk		
- * Club domestic league appearances and goals

Mikhail Mikhailovich Mustygin (Russian: Михаил Михайлович Мустыгин; 27 October 1937 – 27 January 2023) was a Soviet and Belarusian footballer who played as a striker.

== Career ==
Mustygin started his career with Avangard Kolomna.

Mustygin was the top scorer of the 1962 Soviet Top League with 17 goals scored, and of the 1967 Soviet Top League with 19 goals.

Mustygin won the bronze medal with Dinamo Minsk in the 1963 Soviet Top League, and was included in the top-33-players year-end list in both 1963 and 1967.
