= Gennadi Gusarov =

Soviet Russian footballer (1937–2014)

Personal information
- Full name: Gennadi Aleksandrovich Gusarov
- Date of birth: 11 March 1937
- Place of birth: Moscow, USSR
- Date of death: 2 June 2014 (aged 77)
- Place of death: Moscow, Russia
- Height: 1.74 m (5 ft 9 in)
- Positions: Forward; midfielder

Youth career
- CSKA Moscow
- FShM Moscow

Senior career*
| Years | Team | Apps | (Gls) |
| 1957–1962 | Torpedo Moscow | 123 | (68) |
| 1963–1968 | Dynamo Moscow | 125 | (25) |
| 1969–1971 | Dynamo Barnaul | 75 | (15) |
| Total | | 323 | (108) |

International career
| 1961–1964 | USSR | 11 | (4) |

Managerial career
- 1969: Dynamo Moscow (youth teams)
- 1972–1973: Dynamo Moscow (youth teams)
- 1974: Dynamo Bryansk (director)
- 1975–2014: Dynamo Moscow (youth teams)
Medal record
Representing Soviet Union
UEFA European Championship
| Runner-up | 1964 Spain |
- * Club domestic league appearances and goals

Gennadi Aleksandrovich Gusarov (Russian: Геннадий Александрович Гусаров) (11 March 1937 – 2 June 2014) was a Soviet Russian football player.

== Club career ==
Gusarov began playing for the youth team of CDSA (1951–1955), coached by I. P. Ponomaryov. He then played for the FShM team at the Central Stadium named after V. I. Lenin (1955–1957), from where he moved to the Torpedo first team. While playing for Torpedo, Gusarov graduated from the Moscow Aviation Institute in 1962. He was a member of the Komsomol (VLKSM).

On the field, he was noted for his organizational skills, technique, and ability to read the game well. His teammates included Eduard Streltsov, Valentin Ivanov, Valery Voronin, Slava Metreveli, Viktor Shustikov, and many others.

Following the dismissal of his favorite coach, Viktor Maslov, from Torpedo and a decline in the team’s performance, in 1963 he transferred to Moscow’s Dynamo, changing his role from forward to midfielder. He quickly adapted to the new position and became the team’s playmaker. In the mid-1960s, together with Vladimir Dudko and Valery Maslov, he became a mainstay of Dynamo’s midfield.

He ended his playing career in Barnaul, representing the local Dynamo from 1969 to 1971.

== International career ==
Gusarov earned 11 caps and scored 4 goals for the USSR national team, and represented the country in the 1958 FIFA World Cup, the 1962 FIFA World Cup, and the 1964 European Nations' Cup.

== Later life and death ==
Gusarov entered the Barnaul State Pedagogical University, Faculty of Physical Education, graduating in 1973, after which he moved into coaching: first at Dynamo Bryansk (1974), then returning to Moscow Dynamo to train young players (1975–1981). From 1982, he served as senior coach at the Dynamo Moscow Specialized Youth Sports School of the Olympic Reserve (SDYUSHOR), where he trained many well-known footballers, including Sergei Ovchinnikov, Lev Berezner, Vladimir Dolbonosov Jr., Andrei Dyatel, and others.

In his later years, he worked in the Dynamo club’s division responsible for veteran players.

He was buried in Moscow at the Golovinsky Cemetery.

== Honours ==
- Soviet Top League: 1960, 1963; runner-up 1961, 1967
- Soviet Cup: 1960, 1967; finalist 1961

Soviet Union

- 1964 European Nations' Cup runner-up: 1964

Individual

- Grigory Fedotov club member
- Top 33 players year-end list: five times
- Soviet Top League top scorer: 1960, 1961
