= 1959 Soviet Football Championship, Class A =

21st season of top-tier football league in Soviet Union

Soviet Top League
- Season: 1959

12 teams took part in the league with FC Dynamo Moscow winning the championship.

== League standings ==
Pos	Team	Pld	W	D	L	GF	GA	GD	Pts
1	(Russian Soviet Federative Socialist Republic) Dynamo Moscow (C)	22	13	5	4	42	21	+21	31
2	(Russian Soviet Federative Socialist Republic) Lokomotiv Moscow	22	12	5	5	42	25	+17	29
3	(Georgian Soviet Socialist Republic) Dynamo Tbilisi	22	12	3	7	48	33	+15	27
4	(Russian Soviet Federative Socialist Republic) SKA Rostov-on-Don	22	11	4	7	37	31	+6	26
5	(Russian Soviet Federative Socialist Republic) Torpedo Moscow	22	11	3	8	27	23	+4	25
6	(Russian Soviet Federative Socialist Republic) Spartak Moscow	22	8	8	6	32	28	+4	24
7	(Ukrainian Soviet Socialist Republic) Dynamo Kiev	22	6	8	8	26	33	−7	20
8	(Russian Soviet Federative Socialist Republic) Zenit Leningrad	22	8	4	10	29	38	−9	20
9	(Russian Soviet Federative Socialist Republic) CSK MO Moscow	22	8	3	11	29	27	+2	19
10	(Moldavian Soviet Socialist Republic) Moldova Kishinyov	22	6	5	11	22	45	−23	17
11	(Russian Soviet Federative Socialist Republic) Krylia Sovetov Kuybyshev	22	6	1	15	26	37	−11	13
12	(Ukrainian Soviet Socialist Republic) Shakhtyor Stalino	22	4	5	13	24	43	−19	13

Source: rsssf.com
(C) Champions

== Results ==
Home \ Away	CSK	DYK	DYN	DTB	KRY	LOK	MOL	SHA	SKA	SPA	TOR	ZEN
CSK MO Moscow		3–0	2–3	0–2	1–2	1–0	7–0	2–0	0–1	3–0	2–0	2–0
Dynamo Kiev	2–0		0–0	2–2	2–1	1–2	2–2	1–1	0–0	2–2	0–3	1–2
Dynamo Moscow	3–0	0–0		1–2	3–1	7–1	2–1	3–3	3–1	1–3	2–1	4–1
Dynamo Tbilisi	4–1	4–2	1–3		3–2	2–0	5–1	4–0	2–2	1–1	0–1	5–1
Krylia Sovetov Kuybyshev	1–1	0–2	0–1	1–2		0–1	3–0	0–1	1–2	4–2	3–1	2–0
Lokomotiv Moscow	2–0	3–0	1–1	4–1	5–2		3–0	2–2	2–0	1–2	4–0	0–0
Moldova Chisinau	1–0	2–2	0–1	2–0	2–0	1–1		1–1	1–3	1–1	1–0	3–2
Shakhtyor Stalino	2–1	0–2	0–2	0–1	2–0	0–2	2–0		2–3	1–1	0–3	2–4
SKA Rostov-on-Don	2–0	2–3	1–0	2–1	4–2	1–2	1–2	4–2		1–3	3–1	2–1
Spartak Moscow	1–1	0–1	0–1	4–5	1–0	1–1	4–0	1–0	1–0		1–1	3–1
Torpedo Moscow	0–1	2–0	2–1	1–0	1–0	2–1	2–0	3–1	1–1	0–0		2–0
Zenit Leningrad	1–1	2–1	0–0	2–1	0–1	1–4	3–1	3–2	1–1	2–0	2–0	

Legend: Blue = home team win; Yellow = draw; Red = away team win.

== Top scorers ==
16 goals

- Zaur Kaloyev (Dinamo Tbilisi)

14 goals

- Viktor Sokolov (Lokomotiv Moscow)

11 goals

- Tengiz Melashvili (Dinamo Tbilisi)

10 goals

- Valentin Bubukin (Lokomotiv Moscow)

9 goals

- German Apukhtin (CSK MO Moscow)
- Yuri Korotkov (Moldova Kishinyov)
- Viktor Ponedelnik (SKVO Rostov-on-Don)

8 goals

- Genrikh Fedosov (Dynamo Moscow)
- Anatoli Isayev (Spartak Moscow)
- Dmitri Shapovalov (Dynamo Moscow)
