= Vasily Buzunov =

Russian footballer and hockey player

Personal information
- Full name: Vasily Gavrilovich Buzunov
- Date of birth: 4 February 1928
- Place of birth: Ishim, Kemerovo Oblast, Soviet Union
- Date of death: 18 February 2004 (aged 76)
- Place of death: Romanovka, Leningrad Oblast, Russia
- Height: 1.82 m (6 ft 0 in)
- Position: Forward

Youth career
- 1946–1947: Spartak Krasnoyarsk

Senior career*
Years	Team	Apps	(Gls)
1947–1948	Dinamo Krasnoyarsk		
1948–1949	ODO Irkutsk		
1949–1952	ODO Sverdlovsk		
1952	CDSA Moscow	3	(2)
1952–1953	MVO Moscow	2	(0)
1953–1954	Dynamo Moscow	2	(0)
1954–1955	CDSA Moscow	22	(4)
1955–1957	ODO Sverdlovsk	53	(45)
1957–1959	CSKA Moscow	38	(23)
1959–1961	GSFG		
1961–1962	Volga Kalinin		
Total		+120	(+74)

International career
1955–1956	Soviet Union B		
- * Club domestic league appearances and goals

Vasily Gavrilovich Buzunov (Russian: Василий Гаврилович Бузунов; 4 February 1928 in Ishim, Kemerovo Oblast – 18 February 2004) was a Russian footballer and hockey player.

== Career ==
In 1946, he began his career in football and hockey for Spartak Krasnoyarsk, and the following year he moved to Dinamo Krasnoyarsk. When the time came to serve in the army, he was sent to a military club in Irkutsk. After two years, he moved first to Sverdlovsk, and in 1952 to Moscow, where he played for CDSA Moscow and Moscow MWO. In 1953 he moved to Dinamo Moscow. He later played for ODO Sverdlovsk and from 1959 to 1960 he served in the GDR team playing in a Representative district. In 1962, he ended his football career at Volga Kalinin. Buzunov was a bronze medalist at the USSR Championships in 1958, a champion of the First Division of the USSR: 1955, 1961 and USSR Championship top scorer in 1956 (17 goals) and 1957 (16 goals).
