= 1967 Soviet Top League =

30th season of top-tier football league in Soviet Union

Soviet Top League
- Season: 1967

19 teams took part in the league with FC Dynamo Kyiv winning the championship.

== League standings ==
Pos	Team	Pld	W	D	L	GF	GA	GD	Pts	Qualification
1	(Ukrainian Soviet Socialist Republic) Dynamo Kyiv (C)	36	21	12	3	51	11	+40	54	Qualification for European Cup first round
2	(Russian Soviet Federative Socialist Republic) Dynamo Moscow	36	18	13	5	55	28	+27	49	Qualification for Cup Winners' Cup first round
3	(Georgian Soviet Socialist Republic) Dinamo Tbilisi	36	16	13	7	53	33	+20	45	
4	(Byelorussian Soviet Socialist Republic) Dinamo Minsk	36	13	17	6	47	31	+16	43	
5	(Azerbaijan Soviet Socialist Republic) Neftyanik Baku	36	16	10	10	51	33	+18	42	
6	(Ukrainian Soviet Socialist Republic) Shakhtar Donetsk	36	13	16	7	43	38	+5	42	
7	(Russian Soviet Federative Socialist Republic) Spartak Moscow	36	13	14	9	38	30	+8	40	
8	(Armenian Soviet Socialist Republic) Ararat Yerevan	36	13	10	13	40	38	+2	36	
9	(Russian Soviet Federative Socialist Republic) CSKA Moscow	36	12	12	12	35	35	0	36	
10	(Russian Soviet Federative Socialist Republic) SKA Rostov-on-Don	36	13	8	15	39	42	−3	34	
11	(Russian Soviet Federative Socialist Republic) Krylya Sovetov Kuybyshev	36	8	18	10	23	28	−5	34	
12	(Russian Soviet Federative Socialist Republic) Torpedo Moscow	36	12	9	15	38	47	−9	33	
13	(Georgian Soviet Socialist Republic) Torpedo Kutaisi	36	8	15	13	37	50	−13	31	
14	(Kazakh Soviet Socialist Republic) Kairat Alma-Ata	36	10	11	15	27	47	−20	31	
15	(Uzbek Soviet Socialist Republic) Pakhtakor Tashkent	36	5	19	12	31	42	−11	29	
16	(Ukrainian Soviet Socialist Republic) Zarya Luhansk	36	8	13	15	27	42	−15	29	
17	(Russian Soviet Federative Socialist Republic) Lokomotiv Moscow	36	7	14	15	33	37	−4	28	
18	(Ukrainian Soviet Socialist Republic) Chornomorets Odessa	36	8	11	17	25	46	−21	27	
19	(Russian Soviet Federative Socialist Republic) Zenit Leningrad	36	6	9	21	28	63	−35	21	

Source: rsssf.com
(C) Champions

== Results ==
Home \ Away	ARA	CHO	CSK	DYK	DMN	DYN	DTB	KAI	KRY	LOK	NEF	PAK	SHA	SKA	SPA	TKU	TOR	ZAR	ZEN
Ararat Yerevan		1–1	0–2	0–0	1–2	1–2	0–1	0–0	0–0	1–0	2–1	1–0	2–1	2–0	0–1	1–0	5–0	2–0	4–3
Chornomorets Odessa	0–2		0–1	0–0	2–2	0–3	2–0	0–1	1–1	1–0	0–0	0–0	2–1	0–1	1–1	2–0	0–1	1–0	2–1
CSKA Moscow	3–0	2–1		1–1	1–0	0–0	1–1	0–1	0–0	1–1	1–1	2–0	1–1	1–2	3–2	1–3	1–0	1–2	1–0
Dynamo Kyiv	0–0	1–0	0–0		0–1	2–3	3–0	3–0	2–0	1–0	2–0	4–0	3–0	2–0	1–0	2–0	0–0	2–0	2–0
Dinamo Minsk	4–1	4–0	1–1	1–3		1–2	2–4	3–0	1–0	1–0	1–1	2–1	0–0	1–1	1–1	0–0	1–1	1–1	3–0
Dynamo Moscow	1–1	1–0	2–0	0–0	0–2		0–1	4–0	0–0	3–2	2–0	4–0	3–2	1–1	0–0	6–1	0–0	0–1	1–1
Dinamo Tbilisi	1–1	1–0	1–0	1–1	1–1	5–1		3–0	0–0	2–2	1–0	1–0	1–2	1–1	2–3	2–0	0–1	3–3	6–1
Kairat Alma-Ata	0–2	1–1	0–1	0–1	1–1	0–2	0–3		1–0	1–1	2–0	1–1	1–0	3–2	1–0	1–1	0–0	2–0	1–2
Krylya Sovetov Kuybyshev	0–0	1–0	0–0	0–0	0–0	1–2	1–1	1–0		0–0	1–0	0–0	1–1	2–0	1–2	2–3	2–1	1–1	4–0
Lokomotiv Moscow	0–1	5–0	1–0	0–0	0–0	1–1	1–1	4–0	1–1		0–5	1–1	0–1	1–0	1–0	1–1	1–2	3–1	4–2
Neftyanik Baku	1–0	3–1	4–0	0–1	1–0	1–0	1–1	2–0	3–0	1–0		2–2	1–3	1–0	1–0	3–0	3–1	3–1	3–0
Pakhtakor Tashkent	3–0	1–1	1–1	0–2	1–1	1–3	0–0	2–0	0–0	2–1	3–3		1–1	3–1	1–1	0–1	1–1	0–0	2–0
Shakhtar Donetsk	1–0	1–1	2–1	2–1	1–4	0–0	3–2	1–1	0–0	0–0	1–1	1–0		0–1	1–1	1–1	1–1	2–1	2–0
SKA Rostov-on-Don	1–1	0–1	1–0	0–0	0–0	1–4	0–1	2–1	4–0	1–1	1–0	2–1	1–2		1–2	3–0	0–1	0–3	2–1
Spartak Moscow	1–0	1–1	2–1	0–2	2–0	0–0	1–0	1–1	1–0	1–0	1–1	1–1	0–1	0–0		2–1	1–3	0–0	3–0
Torpedo Kutaisi	2–1	2–0	1–3	1–1	3–3	2–2	1–1	1–2	0–0	0–0	1–1	0–0	2–2	1–2	0–0		1–0	2–1	3–0
Torpedo Moscow	4–3	1–2	2–1	0–1	0–1	0–1	0–1	1–3	0–1	2–0	3–1	1–0	2–2	0–2	2–6	2–2		3–1	1–0
Zarya Voroshilovgrad	1–1	1–0	1–1	1–4	0–1	0–1	0–2	1–1	0–1	1–0	1–1	0–0	0–2	2–1	1–0	1–0	0–0		0–0
Zenit Leningrad	1–3	4–1	0–1	0–3	0–0	0–0	0–1	0–0	3–1	1–0	0–1	2–2	1–1	2–4	0–0	1–0	2–1	0–0	

Legend: Blue = home team win; Yellow = draw; Red = away team win.

== Top scorers ==
19 goals

- Mikhail Mustygin (Dinamo Minsk)

17 goals

- Oleg Kopayev (SKA Rostov-on-Don)

14 goals

- Eduard Markarov (Neftyanik)

13 goals

- Anatoliy Banishevskiy (Neftyanik)
- Givi Nodia (Dinamo Tbilisi)
- Gennady Yevriuzhikin (Dynamo Moscow)

12 goals

- Yuri Vshivtsev (Dynamo Moscow)

11 goals

- Nikolai Kazaryan (Ararat)

10 goals

- Gennadi Krasnitsky (Pakhtakor)
- Eduard Malofeyev (Dinamo Minsk)
- Demuri Vekua (Torpedo Kutaisi)
