= Zaur Kaloev =

Soviet and Georgian footballer

Zaur Kaloevi
Personal information
- Date of birth: 24 March 1931
- Place of birth: Tbilisi, Georgian SSR
- Date of death: 23 December 1997 (aged 66)
- Place of death: Tbilisi, Georgia
- Height: 1.80 m (5 ft 11 in)
- Position: Attacking midfielder

Senior career*
Years	Team	Apps	(Gls)
1950–1952	Spartaki Tbilisi	26	(13)
1953–1956	Dinamo Tbilisi	67	(23)
1957–1958	Lokomotiv Moscow	21	(7)
1959–1964	Dinamo Tbilisi	138	(75)

International career^{‡}
1959	Soviet Union Olympic	3	(0)
Medal record
Representing Soviet Union
UEFA European Championship
Winner	1960 France
- * Club domestic league appearances and goals as of 28 February 2016 ‡ National team caps and goals as of 28 February 2016

Zaur Kaloevi (Georgian: ზაურ კალოევი; 24 March 1931 – 23 December 1997) was a Georgian footballer.

During his career he played for Spartaki Tbilisi (1950–1951), Dinamo Tbilisi (1953–1956, 1959–1964), and Lokomotiv Moscow (1957–1958). He participated in the first ever European Nations' Cup in 1960, where the Soviets were champions, and played 3 matches for the Soviets at the Olympic level.

Zaur Kaloev was one of the most brilliant headers of his time. His Georgian friend and teammate Mikhail Meskhi said, "if I want to score a goal, I have to make sure my cross hits Zaur's head. Because it will certainly result in a goal
