= Soviet Union national football team results (1924–1969) =

The following is a list of the Soviet Union national football team results from 1923 to 1969:

Until 1952, the Soviet Union had isolated itself from the international community due to its policy and preparation for the "Worldwide Revolution" against the bourgeoisie class. Soon after establishing the Comintern, the Soviet Union established the Red Sport International.

After the World War II and joining the international community, the Soviet Union ignored restrictions from the International Olympic Committee prohibiting professional athletes from competing in its football competition; the Soviet Union and its satellites were fielding their first teams in the Olympic football competitions. Their main argument was that their players are on the payrolls of state enterprises and are not earning money by being sold to capitalists. The Soviet Union effectively exploited the argument between FIFA and IOC about the players' status in their respective competitions.

== Results ==
Key
Win
Draw
Defeat

== Matches ==
=== 1923 ===
In 1923, the Russian Soviet Federative Socialist Republic played several matches against European competition.

21 August Friendly	Sweden	1–2	Russian SFSR	Stockholm, Sweden
		Report	Grigoryev; Butusov	Stadium: Stockholm Olympic Stadium; Attendance: 4,000; Referee: Ruben Gelbord (Sweden)

30 August Friendly	Norway	2–3	Russian SFSR	Kristiania, Norway
			Butusov; Isakov; Kanunnikov	Stadium: Bislett Stadium; Attendance: 7,000

19 September Friendly	Estonia	2–4	Russian SFSR	Tallinn, Estonia
16:30 UTC+2	Kaljot 63' (pen.), 71' (pen.)	Report	Butusov 28', 37', 84'; Isakov 50'	Stadium: Kalevi staadion Attendance: 4,000; Referee: Max Adler (Austria)

=== 1924 ===
The first officially recognized match of the Soviet Union national football team was played in 1924. Note that the Soviet Union was neither a member of the FIFA nor the IOC and had a status similar to that of the Gibraltar national football team before 2012. The game was considered official because the Turkey national football team supposedly requested that FIFA allow them to play the match as the official.

16 November Friendly	Soviet Union	3–0	Turkey	Moscow, Soviet Union
	Butusov 14', 25'; Shpakovsky 70'	(Report)		Stadium: V. Vorovskiy Stadium; Attendance: 15,000; Referee: Hamdi Emin Çap (Turkey)

=== 1925 ===
15 May Friendly	Turkey	1–2	Soviet Union	Ankara, Turkey
	Arca 3'	(Report)	82' Selin; 85' Butusov	Stadium: (Turkey) İstiklâl Stadium; Attendance: 5,000; Referee: (Turkey) Hamdi Emin Çap

The Soviet Union's match against Turkey in 1925 was their last officially sanctioned match until 1954.

=== Unofficial Matches (1924-1958) ===
The Soviet Union did not play any official matches between 1925 and 1952.

=== 1952 ===
15 July 1952 Summer Olympics PR	Soviet Union	2–1 (a.e.t.)	Bulgaria	Kotka, Finland
19:00	Bobrov 100'; Trofimov 104'	Report	Kolev 95'	Stadium: Kotkan Urheilukeskus; Attendance: 10,637; Referee: Istvan Zsolt (Hungary)

20 July 1952 Summer Olympics R16	Yugoslavia	5–5 (a.e.t.)	Soviet Union	Tampere, Finland
19:00	Mitić 29'; Ognjanov 33'; Zebec 44', 59'; Bobek 46'	Report	Bobrov 53', 77', 87'; Trofimov 75'; Petrov 89'	Stadium: Ratina Stadion; Attendance: 17,000; Referee: Arthur Ellis (Great Britain)

22 July 1952 Summer Olympics R16 (replay)	Yugoslavia	3–1	Soviet Union	Tampere, Finland
19:00	Mitić 19'; Bobek 29' (pen.); Čajkovski 54'	Report	Bobrov 6'	Stadium: Ratina Stadion; Attendance: 16,916; Referee: Arthur Ellis (Great Britain)

=== 1954 ===
8 September Friendly	Soviet Union	7–0	Sweden	Moscow, Soviet Union
	Simonyan 6', 70'; Ilyin 8'; Andersson 25' (o.g.); Gogoberidze 40'; Salnikov 63', 83'	Report		Stadium: Dynamo Stadium; Attendance: 54,000; Referee: William Ling (England)

26 September Friendly	Soviet Union	1–1	Hungary	Moscow, Soviet Union
	Salnikov 14'	Report	Kocsis 59'	Stadium: Dynamo Stadium; Attendance: 54,000; Referee: Arthur Ellis (England)

=== 1955 ===
26 June Friendly	Sweden	0–6	Soviet Union	Solna, Sweden
		Report	Streltsov 4', 14', 42'; Tatushin 31'; Salnikov 47'; Ivanov 68'	Stadium: Råsunda Stadium; Attendance: 38,249; Referee: William Ling (England)

21 August Friendly	Soviet Union	3–2	West Germany	Moscow, Soviet Union
	Parshin 16'; Maslyonkin 69'; Ilyin 73'	Report	Walter 29'; Schäfer 52'	Stadium: Dynamo Stadium; Attendance: 54,000; Referee: William Ling (England)

16 September Friendly	Soviet Union	11–1	India	Moscow, Soviet Union
	Shabrov 18', 47'; Streltsov 19', 46', 73'; Kuznetsov 32', 85'; Salnikov 60', 63', 74'; Netto 80'	Report	Ghosh 66'	Stadium: Dynamo Stadium; Attendance: 25,000; Referee: Nikolai Latyshev (Soviet Union)

25 September Friendly	Hungary	1–1	Soviet Union	Budapest, Hungary
	Puskás 87' (pen.)	Report	Kuznetsov 50'	Stadium: Népstadion; Attendance: 103,000; Referee: Arthur Ellis (England)

23 October Friendly	Soviet Union	2–2	France	Moscow, Soviet Union
	Streltsov 42'; Simonyan 46'	Report	Kopa 29'; Piantoni 64'	Stadium: Dynamo Stadium; Attendance: 54,000; Referee: Arthur Ellis (England)

=== 1956 ===
23 May Friendly	Soviet Union	5–1	Denmark	Moscow, Soviet Union
	Ivanov 10'; Salnikov 16', 84'; Streltsov 51'; Ilyin 59'	Report	Lundberg 75'	Stadium: Dynamo Stadium; Attendance: 54,000; Referee: Franz Grill (Austria)

1 July Friendly	Denmark	2–5	Soviet Union	Copenhagen, Denmark
	Andersen 21'; Jensen 87'	Report	Ilyin 32', 64', 73'; Isayev 57'; Tatushin 71'	Stadium: Idraetspark; Attendance: 51,000; Referee: Jack Clough (England)

11 July 1956 Summer Olympics qualifiers	Soviet Union	5–0	Israel	Moscow, Soviet Union
	Tatushin 2'; Ivanov 26', 71'; Simonyan 45', 78'	Report		Stadium: Dynamo Stadium; Attendance: 54,000; Referee: Sandy Griffiths (Wales)

31 July 1956 Summer Olympics qualifiers	Israel	1–2	Soviet Union	Ramat Gan, Israel
	Stelmach 64'	Report	Tatushin 59'; Ilyin 79'	Stadium: Ramat Gan Stadium; Attendance: 60,000; Referee: Francesco Liverani (Italy)

15 September Friendly	West Germany	1–2	Soviet Union	Hannover, West Germany
	Schröder 5'	Report	Streltsov 3'; Ivanov 36'	Stadium: Niedersachsenstadion; Attendance: 86,000; Referee: Arthur Ellis (England)

23 September Friendly	Soviet Union	0–1	Hungary	Moscow, Soviet Union
		Report	Czibor 16'	Stadium: Lenin Central Stadium; Attendance: 102,000; Referee: Jacques Devillers (France)

21 October Friendly	France	2–1	Soviet Union	Paris, France
	Tellechéa 46'; Vincent 54'	Report	Isayev 64'	Stadium: Colombes; Attendance: 62,145; Referee: Sandy Griffiths (Wales)

24 November 1956 Summer Olympics R1	Soviet Union	2–1	United Team of Germany	Melbourne, Australia
14:30 AEST (UTC+10)	Isayev 23'; Streltsov 86'	Report	Habig 89'	Stadium: Olympic Park Stadium; Attendance: 12,000; Referee: Robert Mann (Great Britain)

29 November 1956 1956 Summer Olympics QF replay	Soviet Union	0–0 (a.e.t.)	Indonesia	Melbourne, Australia
16:30 AEST (UTC+10)		Report		Stadium: Olympic Park Stadium; Attendance: 3,228; Referee: Shigemaru Takenokoshi (Japan)

1 December 1956 1956 Summer Olympics QF	Soviet Union	4–0	Indonesia	Melbourne, Australia
10:30 AEST (UTC+10)	Salnikov 17', 59'; Ivanov 19'; Netto 43'	Report		Stadium: Olympic Park Stadium; Attendance: 6,735; Referee: Reginald Lund (New Zealand)

5 December 1956 1956 Summer Olympics SF	Soviet Union	2–1 (a.e.t.)	Bulgaria	Melbourne, Australia
16:30 AEST (UTC+10)	Streltsov 112'; Tatushin 116'	Report	Kolev 95'	Stadium: Olympic Park Stadium; Attendance: 21,079; Referee: Robert Mann (Great Britain)

8 December 1956 1956 Summer Olympics Final	Soviet Union	1–0	Yugoslavia	Melbourne, Australia
14:15 AEST (UTC+10)	Ilyin 48'	Report		Stadium: Melbourne Cricket Ground; Attendance: 86,716; Referee: Ron Wright (Australia)

=== 1957 ===
1 June Friendly	Soviet Union	1–1	Romania	Moscow, Soviet Union
	Strelțov 78'	(Report)	51' Ene	Stadium: Lenin Central Stadium; Attendance: 100,000; Referee: Sten Ahlner (Sweden)

23 June 1958 World Cup qualification	Soviet Union	3–0	Poland	Moscow, Soviet Union
	Tatushin 9'; Simonyan 55'; Ilyin 77'	Report		Stadium: Lenin Central Stadium; Attendance: 102,000; Referee: Jack Clough (England)

21 July Friendly	Bulgaria	0–4	Soviet Union	Sofia, Bulgaria
		Report	Streltsov 40', 56'; Ilyin 43'; Isayev 61'	Stadium: Vasil Levski Stadium; Attendance: 45,000; Referee: Dumitru Schulder (Romania)

27 July 1958 World Cup qualification	Soviet Union	2–1	Finland	Moscow, Soviet Union
	Voinov 23'; Netto 62'	Report	Lahtinen 42'	Stadium: Dynamo Stadium; Attendance: 50,000; Referee: Mayer (Austria)

15 August 1958 World Cup qualification	Finland	0–10	Soviet Union	Helsinki, Finland
		Report	Netto 6'; Simonyan 9', 13', 31'; Isayev 12', 20'; Streltsov 29', 49'; Ilyin 60', 87'	Stadium: Helsingin Olympiastadion; Attendance: 18,154; Referee: A. Asmussen (Denmark)

22 September Friendly	Hungary	1–2	Soviet Union	Budapest, Hungary
	Hidegkuti 26'	Report	Tatushin 7' Streltsov 88'	Stadium: Népstadion; Attendance: 91,000; Referee: Marcel Lequesne (France)

20 October 1958 World Cup qualification	Poland	2–1	Soviet Union	Chorzów, Poland
	Cieślik 43', 50'	Report	Ivanov 80'	Stadium: Stadion Śląski; Attendance: 93,000; Referee: Jack Clough (England)

24 November 1958 World Cup qualification	Soviet Union	2–0	Poland	Leipzig, East Germany
	Streltsov 31'; Fedosov 75'	Report		Stadium: Zentralstadion; Attendance: 100,000; Referee: Jack Clough (England)

=== 1958 ===
18 May Friendly	Soviet Union	1–1	England	Moscow, Soviet Union
	V. Ivanov 78'	Report	Kevan 45'	Stadium: Lenin Stadium; Attendance: 105,000; Referee: Fritz Seipelt (Austria)

8 June 1958 World Cup GS	Soviet Union	2–2	England	Gothenburg, Sweden
19:00 (CET)	Simonyan 13'; A. Ivanov 56'	Report	Kevan 66'; Finney 85' (pen.)	Stadium: Ullevi; Attendance: 49,348; Referee: István Zsolt (Hungary)

11 June 1958 World Cup GS	Soviet Union	2–0	Austria	Borås, Sweden
19:00 (CET)	Ilyin 15'; V. Ivanov 62'	Report		Stadium: Ryavallen; Attendance: 21,239; Referee: Carl Jørgensen (Denmark)

15 June 1958 World Cup GS	Brazil	2–0	Soviet Union	Gothenburg, Sweden
19:00 (CET)	Vavá 3', 77'	Report		Stadium: Ullevi; Attendance: 50,928; Referee: Maurice Guigue (France)

17 June 1958 World Cup PO	Soviet Union	1–0	England	Gothenburg, Sweden
19:00 (CET)	Ilyin 69'	Report		Stadium: Ullevi; Attendance: 23,182; Referee: Albert Dusch (West Germany)

19 June 1958 World Cup QF	Sweden	2–0	Soviet Union	Solna, Sweden
19:00 (CET)	Hamrin 49'; Simonsson 88'	Report		Stadium: Råsunda Stadium; Attendance: 31,900; Referee: Reginald Leafe (England)

30 August Friendly	Czechoslovakia	1–2	Soviet Union	Prague, Czechoslavakia
	Masopust 23'		Voroshilov 56'; Voinov 66'	Stadium: Strahov Stadion; Referee: Leo Helge (Denmark)

28 September 1960 European Nations' Cup R16	Soviet Union	3–1	Hungary	Moscow, Soviet Union
19:00	Ilyin 4'; Metreveli 20'; Ivanov 32'	Report	Göröcs 84'	Stadium: Central Lenin Stadium; Attendance: 100,572; Referee: Alfred Grill (Austria)

22 October Friendly	England	5–0	Soviet Union	London, England
	Haynes 45', 63', 82'; Charlton 84' (pen.); Lofthouse 90'	Report		Stadium: Wembley Stadium; Attendance: 100,000; Referee: Maurice Guigue (France)

=== 1959 ===
6 September Friendly	Soviet Union	3–1	Czechoslovakia	Moscow, Soviet Union
	Bubukin 4'; Meskhi 35'; Ivanov 64'	Report	Molnár 51'	Stadium: Lenin Stadium; Attendance: 102,000; Referee: Vilmos Hernádi (Hungary)

27 September 1960 European Nations' Cup R16	Hungary	0–1	Soviet Union	Budapest, Hungary
15:30		Report	Voynov 58'	Stadium: Népstadion; Attendance: 78,481; Referee: Jozef Kowal (Poland)

3 October Friendly	China	0–1	Soviet Union	Beijing, China
		Report	Ilyin 2'	Stadium: Workers' Stadium; Attendance: 80,000; Referee: Zhu Yixian (China)

=== 1960 ===
19 May Friendly	Soviet Union	7–1	Poland	Moscow, Soviet Union
	Ivanov 4', 87'; Bubukin 8'; Ponedelnik 14', 86', 90'; Metreveli 24'	Report	Pohl 85' (pen.)	Stadium: Lenin Stadium; Attendance: 85,000; Referee: Kostadin Dinov (Bulgaria)

6 July 1960 European Nations' Cup SF	Czechoslovakia	0–3	Soviet Union	Marseille, France
21:30		Report	Ivanov 34', 56'; Ponedelnik 66'	Stadium: Stade Vélodrome; Attendance: 25,184; Referee: Cesare Jonni (Italy)

10 July 1960 European Nations' Cup F	Soviet Union	2–1 (a.e.t.)	Yugoslavia	Paris, France
20:30 CET	Metreveli 49'; Ponedelnik 113'	Report	Galić 43'	Stadium: Parc des Princes; Attendance: 17,966; Referee: Arthur Ellis (England)

17 August Friendly	East Germany	0–1	Soviet Union	Leipzig, East Germany
		Report	Ponedelnik 75'	Stadium: Zentralstadion; Attendance: 70,000; Referee: Josef Stoll (Austria)

4 September Friendly	Austria	3–1	Soviet Union	Vienna, Austria
	Hof 47' (pen.), 88'; Flögel 85'	Report	Ponedelnik 32'	Stadium: Praterstadion; Attendance: 87,000; Referee: Paul Wyssling (Switzerland)

=== 1961 ===
21 May Friendly	Poland	1–0	Soviet Union	Warsaw, Poland
	Pohl 73' (pen.)	Report		Stadium: Stadion Dziesięciolecia; Attendance: 70,000; Referee: Vilmos Kösztner (Hungary)

18 June 1962 World Cup qualification	Soviet Union	1–0	Turkey	Moscow, Soviet Union
	Voronin 20'	Report		Stadium: Lenin Stadium; Attendance: 102,000; Referee: Hirviniemi (Finland)

24 June Friendly	Soviet Union	0–0	Argentina	Moscow, Soviet Union
		Report		Stadium: Lenin Stadium; Attendance: 102,000; Referee: Giulio Campanati (Italy)

1 July 1962 World Cup qualification	Soviet Union	5–2	Norway	Moscow, Soviet Union
	Metreveli 14'; Ponedelnik 26'; Bubukin 32', 66'; Meskhi 53'	Report	Borgen 64'; E. Hansen 87'	Stadium: Lenin Stadium; Attendance: 102,000; Referee: Kowal (Poland)

23 August 1962 World Cup qualification	Norway	0–3	Soviet Union	Oslo, Norway
		Report	Ponedelnik 48'; Meskhi 49'; Metreveli 76'	Stadium: Ullevaal; Attendance: 30,469; Referee: Meighan (Republic of Ireland)

10 September Friendly	Soviet Union	0–1	Austria	Moscow, Soviet Union
		Report	Rafreider 7'	Stadium: Lenin Central Stadium; Attendance: 102,000; Referee: Bertil Lööw (Sweden)

12 November 1962 World Cup qualification	Turkey	1–2	Soviet Union	Istanbul, Turkey
	Oktay 78'	Report	Gusarov 12'; Mamykin 18'	Stadium: Mithat Paşa Stadium; Attendance: 34,000; Referee: Verner (Israel)

18 November Friendly	Argentina	1–2	Soviet Union	Buenos Aires, Argentina
	Belén 89'	Report	Ponedelnik 24', 26'	Stadium: River Plate Stadium; Attendance: 75,000; Referee: Carlos Robles (Chile)

22 November Friendly	Chile	0–1	Soviet Union	Santiago, Chile
		Report	Mamykin 70'	Stadium: Estadio Nacional; Attendance: 70,000; Referee: Juan Carlos Armental (Uruguay)

29 November Friendly	Uruguay	1–2	Soviet Union	Montevideo, Uruguay
	Cubilla 29'	Report	Gusarov 27'; Ponedelnik 44'	Stadium: Estadio Centenario; Attendance: 70,000; Referee: José Luis Praddaude (Argentina)

=== 1962 ===
11 April Friendly	Luxembourg	1–3	Soviet Union	Luxembourg City, Luxembourg
	Schmit 32'		Mamykin 7', 18'; Gusarov 40'	Stadium: Stade Municipal; Attendance: 12,000; Referee: Raymond Lespineux (Belgium)

18 April Friendly	Sweden	0–2	Soviet Union	Solna, Sweden
			Ponedelnik 27'; Mamykin 34'	Stadium: Råsunda; Attendance: 11,089; Referee: Reino Koskinen (Finland)

27 April Friendly	Soviet Union	5–0	Uruguay	Moscow, Soviet Union
	Mamykin 17' (pen.), 26', 75' (pen.); Chislenko 44'; Ivanov 54'			Stadium: Lenin Stadium; Attendance: 103,000; Referee: Roland Bäckström (Sweden)

31 May 1962 World Cup GS	Soviet Union	2–0	Yugoslavia	Arica, Chile
15:00 CLT (UTC-04)	Ivanov 51'; Ponedelnik 83'	Report		Stadium: Estadio Carlos Dittborn; Attendance: 9,622; Referee: Albert Dusch (West Germany)

3 June 1962 World Cup GS	Soviet Union	4–4	Colombia	Arica, Chile
15:00 CLT (UTC-04)	Ivanov 8', 11'; Chislenko 10'; Ponedelnik 56'	Report	Aceros 21'; Coll 68'; Rada 72'; Klinger 86'	Stadium: Estadio Carlos Dittborn; Attendance: 8,040; Referee: João Etzel Filho (Brazil)

6 June 1962 World Cup GS	Soviet Union	2–1	Uruguay	Arica, Chile
15:00 CLT (UTC-04)	Mamykin 38'; Ivanov 89'	Report	Sasía 54'	Stadium: Estadio Carlos Dittborn; Attendance: 9,973; Referee: Cesare Jonni (Italy)

10 June 1962 World Cup QF	Chile	2–1	Soviet Union	Arica, Chile
14:30 CLT (UTC-04)	L. Sánchez 11'; Rojas 29'	Report	Chislenko 26'	Stadium: Estadio Carlos Dittborn; Attendance: 17,268; Referee: Leo Horn (Netherlands)

=== 1963 ===
22 May Friendly	Soviet Union	0–1	Sweden	Moscow, Soviet Union
			Martinsson 23'	Stadium: Lenin Stadium; Attendance: 75,000; Referee: Kostadin Dinov (Bulgaria)

22 September Friendly	Soviet Union	1–1	Hungary	Moscow, Soviet Union
	Ivanov 69'		Machos 76'	Stadium: Lenin Stadium; Attendance: 63,000; Referee: Antero Lartola (Finland)

13 October 1964 European Nations' Cup R16	Soviet Union	2–0	Italy	Moscow, Soviet Union
19:00 UTC+3	Ponedelnik 22'; Chislenko 42'	Report		Stadium: Central Lenin Stadium; Attendance: 102,358; Referee: Ryszard Banasiuk (Poland)

10 November 1964 European Nations' Cup R16	Italy	1–1	Soviet Union	Rome, Italy
14:30 UTC+1	Rivera 89'	Report	Gusarov 33'	Stadium: Stadio Olimpico; Attendance: 69,567; Referee: Daniel Mellet (Switzerland)

1 December Friendly	Morocco	1–1	Soviet Union	Casablanca, Morocco
	Nafai 25'		Tibari 12' (o.g.)	Stadium: Stade d'Honneur; Attendance: 15,000; Referee: Henri Faucheux (France)

=== 1964 ===
13 May 1964 European Nations' Cup QF	Sweden	1–1	Soviet Union	Solna, Sweden
19:00 UTC+1	Hamrin 88'	Report	Ivanov 62'	Stadium: Råsunda Stadion; Attendance: 36,937; Referee: Jim Finney (England)

20 May Friendly	Soviet Union	1–0	Uruguay	Moscow, Soviet Union
	Mudrik 59'			Stadium: Central Lenin Stadium; Attendance: 25,000; Referee: Friedrich Köpke (East Germany)

27 May 1964 European Nations' Cup QF	Soviet Union	3–1	Sweden	Moscow, Soviet Union
19:00 UTC+3	Ponedelnik 32', 56'; Voronin 83'	Report	Hamrin 78'	Stadium: Central Lenin Stadium; Attendance: 99,609; Referee: Arthur Holland (England)

17 June 1964 European Nations' Cup SF	Denmark	0–3	Soviet Union	Barcelona, Spain
22:30		Report	Voronin 19'; Ponedelnik 40'; Ivanov 87'	Stadium: Camp Nou; Attendance: 38,556; Referee: Concetto Lo Bello (Italy)

21 June 1964 European Nations' Cup F	Spain	2–1	Soviet Union	Madrid, Spain
18:30 CET	Pereda 6'; Marcelino 84'	Report, lineups	Khusainov 8'	Stadium: Santiago Bernabéu; Attendance: 79,115; Referee: Arthur Holland (England)

13 October Friendly	Austria	1–0	Soviet Union	Vienna, Austria
	Glechner 44'			Stadium: Praterstadion; Attendance: 72,000; Referee: Gottfried Dienst (Switzerland)

4 November Friendly	Algeria	2–2	Soviet Union	Algiers, Algeria
	Lekkak 47'; Lalmas 74'		Matveyev 9'; Khusainov 51'	Stadium: Stade d’El Asnasser; Attendance: 20,000; Referee: Abdelaziz Chekaïmi (Algeria)

22 November Friendly	Yugoslavia	1–1	Soviet Union	Belgrade, Yugoslavia
	Zambata 22'		Serebryanikov 9'	Stadium: Red Star Stadium; Attendance: 30,000; Referee: Nicolae Mihăilescu (Romania)

29 November Friendly	Bulgaria	0–0	Soviet Union	Sofia, Bulgaria
				Stadium: Vasil Levski Stadium; Attendance: 40,000; Referee: Aleksandar Škorić (Yugoslavia)

=== 1965 ===
16 May Friendly	Soviet Union	0–0	Austria	Moscow, Soviet Union
				Stadium: Lenin Central Stadium; Attendance: 40,000; Referee: Gyula Emsberger (Hungary)

23 May 1966 World Cup Qualifying	Soviet Union	3–1	Greece	Moscow, Soviet Union
	Kazakov 14'; Ivanov 71', 83'	Report	Papaioannou 60'	Stadium: Central Lenin Stadium; Attendance: 79,641; Referee: Beijar (Finland)

30 May 1966 World Cup Qualifying	Soviet Union	2–1	Wales	Moscow, Soviet Union
	Ivanov 39'; Williams 48' (o.g.)	Report	W. Davies 69'	Stadium: Central Lenin Stadium; Attendance: 86,015; Referee: Fritz (West Germany)

27 June 1966 World Cup Qualifying	Soviet Union	6–0	Denmark	Moscow, Soviet Union
	Khusainov 9'; Metreveli 47'; Voronin 64'; Barkaya 69', 77'; Meskhi 72'	Report		Stadium: Central Lenin Stadium; Attendance: 84,134; Referee: Zečević (Yugoslavia)

4 July Friendly	Soviet Union	0–3	Brazil	Moscow, Soviet Union
			Pelé 24', 67'; Flávio Minuano 32'	Stadium: Lenin Stadium; Attendance: 102,000; Referee: Bertil Lööw (Sweden)

4 September Friendly	Soviet Union	0–0	Yugoslavia	Moscow, Soviet Union
				Stadium: Lenin Central Stadium; Attendance: 60,000; Referee: Włodzimierz Storoniak (Poland)

3 October 1966 World Cup Qualifying	Greece	1–4	Soviet Union	Piraeus, Greece
	Papaioannou 27'	Report	Metreveli 14' (pen.); Banişevski 25', 59', 82'	Stadium: Karaiskakis Stadium; Attendance: 39,880; Referee: Shoshany (Israel)

17 October 1966 World Cup Qualifying	Denmark	1–3	Soviet Union	Copenhagen, Denmark
	Troelsen 79'	Report	Metreveli 47'; Malofeyev 62'; Sabo 68'	Stadium: Idraetsparken; Attendance: 32,941; Referee: Webster (Scotland)

27 October 1966 World Cup Qualifying	Wales	2–1	Soviet Union	Cardiff, Wales
	Vernon 20'; Allchurch 77'	Report	Banişevski 17'	Stadium: Ninian Park; Attendance: 24,626; Referee: Nilsen (Norway)

21 November Friendly	Brazil	2–2	Soviet Union	Rio de Janeiro, Brazil
	Gérson 51'; Pelé 54'		Banishevskiy 59'; Metreveli 85'	Stadium: Maracanã; Attendance: 113,248; Referee: Ken Dagnall (England)

1 December Friendly	Argentina	1–1	Soviet Union	Buenos Aires, Argentina
	Onega 48'		Banishevskiy 9'	Stadium: River Plate Stadium; Attendance: 60,000; Referee: P.Vargas (Uruguay)

4 December Friendly	Uruguay	1–3	Soviet Union	Montevideo, Uruguay
	Rocha 32'		Khusainov 25'; Banishevskiy 35'; Osyanin 71'	Stadium: Estadio Centenario; Attendance: 35,000; Referee: Miguel Comesaña (Argentina)

=== 1966 ===
23 February Friendly	Chile	0–2	Soviet Union	Santiago, Chile
			Yozhef Sabo 4' (pen.), 55'	Stadium: Estadio Nacional; Attendance: 70,000; Referee: Claudio Vicuña (Chile)

20 April Friendly	Switzerland	2–2	Soviet Union	Basel, Switzerland
	Hosp 59'; Grobéty 73'		Chislenko 3'; Ponedelnik 9'	Stadium: St. Jakob Stadium; Attendance: 38,543; Referee: Johan Boström (Sweden)

24 April Friendly	Austria	0–1	Soviet Union	Vienna, Austria
			Voronin 19'	Stadium: Praterstadion; Attendance: 67,000; Referee: Gyula Emsberger (Hungary)

18 May Friendly	Czechoslovakia	1–2	Soviet Union	Prague, Czechoslavakia
	Adamec 59'		Banishevskiy 45', 79'	Stadium: Letná Stadium; Attendance: 16,990; Referee: Pierre Schwinte (France)Pierre Schwinte (France)

22 May Friendly	Belgium	0–1	Soviet Union	Brussels, Belgium
			Serebryanikov 11'	Stadium: Heysel Stadium; Attendance: 27,394

5 June Friendly	Soviet Union	3–3	France	Moscow, Soviet Union
	Metreveli 26'; Banishevskiy 64'; Chislenko 66'	Report	Blanchet 19'; Gondet 21'; Bonnel 78'	Stadium: Central Lenin Stadium; Attendance: 102,000; Referee: Bertil Lööw (Sweden)

12 July 1966 World Cup GS	Soviet Union	3–0	North Korea	Middlesbrough, England
19:30 BST	Malofeyev 31', 88'; Banishevskiy 33'	Report		Stadium: Ayresome Park; Attendance: 23,006; Referee: Juan Gardeazábal Garay (Spain)

16 July 1966 World Cup GS	Soviet Union	1–0	Italy	Sunderland, England
15:00 BST	Chislenko 57'	Report		Stadium: Roker Park; Attendance: 27,793; Referee: Rudolf Kreitlein (West Germany)

20 July 1966 World Cup GS	Soviet Union	2–1	Chile	Sunderland, England
19:30 BST	Porkuyan 28', 85'	Report	Marcos 32'	Stadium: Roker Park; Attendance: 16,027; Referee: John Adair (Northern Ireland)

23 July 1966 World Cup QF	Soviet Union	2–1	Hungary	Sunderland, England
15:00 BST	Chislenko 5'; Porkuyan 46'	Report	Bene 57'	Stadium: Roker Park; Attendance: 26,844; Referee: Juan Gardeazábal Garay (Spain)

25 July 1966 World Cup SF	West Germany	2–1	Soviet Union	Liverpool, England
19:30 BST	Haller 43'; Beckenbauer 67'	Report	Porkuyan 88'	Stadium: Goodison Park; Attendance: 38,273; Referee: Concetto Lo Bello (Italy)

28 July 1966 World Cup 3rd place	Portugal	2–1	Soviet Union	London, England
19:30 BST	Eusébio 12' (pen.); Torres 89'	Report	Malofeyev 43' (Note: Goal also credited to Banishevskiy.)	Stadium: Wembley Stadium; Attendance: 87,696; Referee: Ken Dagnall (England)

18 September Friendly	Yugoslavia	1–2	Soviet Union	Belgrade, Yugoslavia
	Mušović 49'		Krasnitskiy 15'; Matveyev 45' (pen.)	Stadium: JNA Stadium; Attendance: 15,000; Referee: Gyula Emsberger (Hungary)

16 October Friendly	Soviet Union	0–2	Turkey	Moscow, Soviet Union
			Zemzem 14'; Elmastaşoğlu 60'	Stadium: Lenin Stadium; Attendance: 40,000; Referee: Jan Pawlik (Poland)

23 October Friendly	Soviet Union	2–2	East Germany	Moscow, Soviet Union
	Streltsov 22'; Chislenko 52'		Fräßdorf 23' Nöldner 68'	Stadium: Lenin Stadium; Attendance: 40,000; Referee: Taisto Enckell (Finland)

1 November Friendly	Italy	1–0	Soviet Union	Milan, Italy
14:30 CET (UTC+01:00)	Guarneri 22'	Report		Stadium: San Siro; Attendance: 55,000; Referee: Juan Gardeazábal (Spain)

=== 1967 ===
10 May Friendly	Scotland	0–2	Soviet Union	Glasgow, Scotland
			Tommy Gemmell 17' (o.g.); Medvid 41'	Stadium: Hampden Park; Attendance: 53,497; Referee: Laurens van Ravens (Netherlands)

28 May Friendly	Soviet Union	2–0	Mexico	Leningrad, Soviet Union
	Chislenko 70'; Byshovets 83'			Stadium: Kirov Stadium; Attendance: 100,000; Referee: Reino Koskinen (Finland)

3 June Friendly	France	2–4	Soviet Union	Paris, France
	Gondet 11'; Simon 45'	Report	Chislenko 33', 59'; Byshovets 47'; Streltsov 80'	Stadium: Parc des Princes; Attendance: 24,778; Referee: Décio Freitas (Portugal)

11 June UEFA Euro 1968 qualifying	Soviet Union	4–3	Austria	Moscow, Soviet Union
19:00	Malofeyev 25'; Byshovets 36'; Chislenko 43' (Note: Goal also credited to Wartusch own goal.); Streltsov 80'	Report	Hof 38'; Wolny 54'; Siber 71'	Stadium: Central Lenin Stadium, Attendance: 72,142; Referee: Johan Einar Boström (Sweden)

16 July UEFA Euro 1968 qualifying	Soviet Union	4–0	Greece	Tbilisi, Soviet Union
19:00	Banishevskiy 50', 77'; Sabo 72' (pen.); Chislenko 83'	Report		Stadium: Central Stadium Dynamo; Attendance: 28,040; Referee: Birger Nilsen (Norway)

30 August UEFA Euro 1968 qualifying	Soviet Union	2–0	Finland	Moscow, Soviet Union
19:00	Khurtsilava 14'; Chislenko 80'	Report		Stadium: Central Lenin Stadium; Attendance: 20,597; Referee: Muzaffer Sarvan (Turkey)

6 September UEFA Euro 1968 qualifying	Finland	2–5	Soviet Union	Turku, Finland
17:30	Peltonen 18' (pen.); Syrjävaara 25'	Report	Sabo 2', 56' (pen.); Maslov 14'; Banishevskiy 35'; Malofeyev 63'	Stadium: Kupittaan Stadion; Attendance: 7,793; Referee: Pavel Špoták (Czechoslovakia)

1 October Friendly	Soviet Union	2–2	Switzerland	Moscow, Soviet Union
	Khurtsilava 18'; Pfirter 41' (o.g.)		Blättler 3'; Perroud 72'	Stadium: Lenin Stadium; Attendance: 35,000; Referee: Roger Mâchin (France)

8 October Friendly	Bulgaria	1–2	Soviet Union	Sofia, Bulgaria
	Dermendzhiev 9'		Streltsov 72'; Banishevskiy 84'	Stadium: Vasil Levski Stadium; Attendance: 21,000; Referee: Stanisław Eksztajn (Poland)

15 October UEFA Euro 1968 qualifying	Austria	1–0	Soviet Union	Vienna, Austria
14:30	Grausam 50'	Report		Stadium: Praterstadion; Attendance: 37,400; Referee: Todor Bechirov (Bulgaria)

31 October UEFA Euro 1968 qualifying	Greece	0–1	Soviet Union	Piraeus, Greece
15:30		Report	Malofeyev 50'	Stadium: Karaiskaki Stadium; Attendance: 33,588; Referee: Gottfried Dienst (Switzerland)

29 November Friendly	Netherlands	3–1	Soviet Union	Rotterdam. Netherlands
	Wery 23' (pen.), 28'; Romeijn 68'		Maslov 35'	Stadium: Stadion Feijenoord; Attendance: 64,000; Referee: Bobby Davidson (Scotland)

6 December Friendly	England	2–2	Soviet Union	London, England
	Ball 23'; Peters 72'		Chislenko 42', 44'	Stadium: Wembley Stadium; Attendance: 93,000; Referee: Rudolf Kreitlein (West Germany)

17 December Friendly	Chile	1–4	Soviet Union	Santiago, Chile
	Reinoso 83'		Moris 29' (o.g.); Streltsov 60', 66', 85'	Stadium: Estadio Nacional; Attendance: 42,471; Referee: Claudio Vicuña (Chile)

=== 1968 ===
3 March Friendly	Mexico	0–0	Soviet Union	Mexico City, Mexico
				Stadium: Estadio Azteca; Attendance: 85,000; Referee: Arturo Yamasaki (Peru)

7 March Friendly	Mexico	1–1	Soviet Union	León, Mexico
	Hernández 31'		Byshovets 3'	Stadium: Estadio León; Attendance: 35,000; Referee: Abel Aguilar (Mexico)

10 March Friendly	Mexico	0–0	Soviet Union	Mexico City, Mexico
				Stadium: Estadio Azteca; Attendance: 60,000; Referee: Arturo Yamasaki (Peru)

24 April Friendly	Soviet Union	1–0	Belgium	Moscow, Soviet Union
	Sabo 90'			Stadium: Lenin Stadium; Attendance: 45,000; Referee: Milivoje Gugulović (Yugoslavia)

4 May UEFA Euro 1968 QF	Hungary	2–0	Soviet Union	Budapest, Hungary
17:00	Farkas 21'; Göröcs 85'	Report		Stadium: Népstadion; Attendance: 71,556; Referee: Laurens Van Ravens (Netherlands)

11 May UEFA Euro 1968 QF	Soviet Union	3–0	Hungary	Moscow, Soviet Union
19:30	Solymosi 22' (o.g.); Khurtsilava 59'; Byshovets 73'	Report		Stadium: Central Lenin Stadium; Attendance: 91,129; Referee: Kurt Tschenscher (West Germany)

5 June UEFA Euro 1968 SF	Italy	0–0 (a.e.t.)	Soviet Union	Naples, Italy
18:00 CEST (UTC+02:00)		Report		Stadium: Stadio San Paolo; Attendance: 68,582; Referee: Kurt Tschenscher (West Germany)
Note: Italy won on coin toss. Italy captain Giacinto Facchetti called the coin toss correctly.

8 June UEFA Euro 1968 3rd place	England	2–0	Soviet Union	Rome, Italy
18:45	B. Charlton 39'; Hurst 63'	Report		Stadium: Stadio Olimpico; Attendance: 68,817; Referee: István Zsolt (Hungary)

16 July Friendly	Soviet Union	3–1	Austria	Leningrad, Soviet Union
	Vyun 12'; Gershkovich 49'; Asatiani 65'		Hof 40'	Stadium: Kirov Stadium; Attendance: 65,000; Referee: Hans Carlsson (Sweden)

1 August Friendly	Sweden	2–2	Soviet Union	Gothenburg, Sweden
	Eriksson 66' (pen.); Grahn 83'		Gershkovich 6'; Khurtsilava 89'	Stadium: Ullevi; Attendance: 44,867; Referee: Arnth Jensen (Denmark)

=== 1969 ===
20 February Friendly	Colombia	1–3	Soviet Union	Bogotá, Colombia
	Santa 37'	Report	Gershkovich 23'; Khmelnitskyi 78', 85'	Stadium: Estadio El Campín; Attendance: 60,000; Referee: Omar Delgado (Colombia)

25 July Friendly	East Germany	2–2	Soviet Union	Leipzig, East Germany
	Löwe 6'; Frenzel 87'	Report	Puzach 34'; Khmelnitskiy 59'	Stadium: Zentralstadion; Attendance: 60,000; Referee: Gyula Emsberger (Hungary)

6 August Friendly	Soviet Union	0–1	Sweden	Moscow, Soviet Union
		Report	Eklund 29'	Stadium: Lenin Stadium; Attendance: 43,000; Referee: Wolfgang Riedel (East Germany)

10 September 1970 World Cup qualification	Northern Ireland	0–0	Soviet Union	Belfast, Northern Ireland
		Report		Stadium: Windsor Park; Referee: Michel Kitabdjian (France)

24 September Friendly	Yugoslavia	1–3	Soviet Union	Belgrade, Yugoslavia
	Džajić 16'	Report	Asatiani 21'; Nodiya 37'; Byshovets 63'	Stadium: JNA Stadium; Attendance: 15,000; Referee: Andrei Radulescu (Romania)

15 October 1970 World Cup qualification	Soviet Union	3–0	Turkey	Kyiv, Soviet Union
	Muntyan 43', 78'; Nodia 62'	Report		Stadium: Central Stadium; Referee: Lööw (Sweden)

22 October 1970 World Cup qualification	Soviet Union	2–0	Northern Ireland	Moscow, Soviet Union
	Nodia 24'; Byshovets 79'	Report		Stadium: Lenin Stadium; Referee: Rudolf Scheurer (Switzerland)

16 November 1970 World Cup qualification	Turkey	1–3	Soviet Union	Istanbul, Turkey
	Ender 24'	Report	Asatiani 3', 60'; Khmelnitsky 34'	Stadium: Ali Sami Yen Stadium; Referee: Ferdinand Marschall (Austria)
