= 1958 FIFA World Cup qualification – UEFA Group 6 =

Football tournament

The three teams in this group played against each other on a home-and-away basis. Poland and the Soviet Union finished level on points; a play-off on neutral ground was played to decide who would qualify. The winner, the Soviet Union, qualified for the sixth FIFA World Cup held in Sweden.

== Table ==
Pos	Team	Pld	W	D	L	GF	GA	GR	Pts	Qualification	Soviet Union national football team	Poland national football team	Finland national football team
1	Soviet Union	4	3	0	1	16	3	5.333	6 (Note: As the Soviet Union and Poland finished level on points, a play-off on neutral ground was played to determine the group winner. The Soviet Union won the play-off 2–0 to win the group.)	Qualification to 1958 FIFA World Cup	—	3–0	2–1
2	Poland	4	3	0	1	9	5	1.800	6		2–1	—	4–0
3	Finland	4	0	0	4	2	19	0.105	0		0–10	1–3	—

Source: FIFA

== Matches ==
23 June 1957

Soviet Union	3 – 0	Poland
Tatushin 9'; Simonyan 55'; Ilyin 77'	Report

Lenin Central Stadium, Moscow, Soviet Union
Attendance: 102,000
Referee: Clough (England)

5 July 1957

Finland	1 – 3	Poland
Vanhanen 72'	Report	Jankowski 19', 56', 65'

Helsingin Olympiastadion, Helsinki, Finland
Attendance: 9,137
Referee: Nilsen (Norway)

27 July 1957

Soviet Union	2 – 1	Finland
Voinov 23'; Netto 62'	Report	Lahtinen 42'

Dynamo Stadium, Moscow, Soviet Union
Attendance: 50,000
Referee: Mayer (Austria)

15 August 1957

Finland	0 – 10	Soviet Union
	Report	Netto 6'; Simonyan 9', 13', 31'; Isayev 12', 20'; Streltsov 29', 49'; Ilyin 60', 87'

Helsingin Olympiastadion, Helsinki, Finland
Attendance: 18,154
Referee: A. Asmussen (Denmark)

20 October 1957

Poland	2 – 1	Soviet Union
Cieślik 43', 50'	Report	Ivanov 80'

Stadion Śląski, Chorzów, Poland
Attendance: 93,000
Referee: Clough (England)

3 November 1957

Poland	4 – 0	Finland
Gawlik 2'; Brychczy 4', 48'; Jankowski 60'	Report

Stadion Dziesięciolecia, Warsaw, Poland
Attendance: 90,000
Referee: Dusch (West Germany)

=== Play-off ===
Poland and the USSR finished level on points; a play-off on neutral ground was played to decide who would qualify.

24 November 1957

Soviet Union	2 – 0	Poland
Streltsov 31'; Fedosov 75'	Report

Zentralstadion, Leipzig, East Germany
Attendance: 100,000
Referee: Clough (England)
