= 1968 Soviet Top League =

31st season of top-tier football league in Soviet Union

Class A – Pervaya Gruppa
- Season: 1968

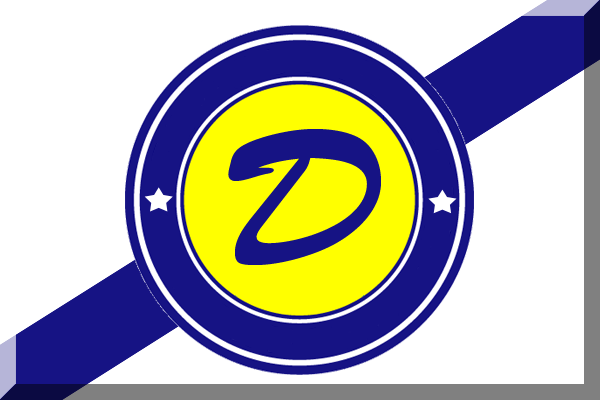
Dynamo Kyiv fantasy flag

The 1968 Class A – Pervaya Gruppa was the 30th season of the first-tier football competition in the Soviet Union. Twenty teams took part in the league with FC Dynamo Kyiv winning the championship.

In the previous season Zenit Leningrad finished last but was spared from relegation due to the 50th Anniversary of the "Great October" being the cradle of the Bolshevik coup-d'etat. The league composition was increased from 19 to 20 keeping the Leningrad team at the top.

== League standings ==
Pos	Team	Pld	W	D	L	GF	GA	GD	Pts	Qualification or relegation
1	(Ukrainian Soviet Socialist Republic) Dynamo Kyiv (C)	38	21	15	2	58	25	+33	57	Qualification for European Cup first round
2	(Russian Soviet Federative Socialist Republic) Spartak Moscow	38	21	10	7	64	43	+21	52	
3	(Russian Soviet Federative Socialist Republic) Torpedo Moscow	38	18	14	6	60	32	+28	50	Qualification for Cup Winners' Cup preliminary round
4	(Russian Soviet Federative Socialist Republic) CSKA Moscow	38	20	10	8	50	30	+20	50	
5	(Russian Soviet Federative Socialist Republic) Dynamo Moscow	38	19	9	10	58	32	+26	47	
6	(Byelorussian Soviet Socialist Republic) Dinamo Minsk	38	17	12	9	52	36	+16	46	
7	(Georgian Soviet Socialist Republic) Dinamo Tbilisi	38	16	13	9	53	29	+24	45	
8	(Ukrainian Soviet Socialist Republic) Chornomorets Odessa	38	11	16	11	47	49	−2	38	
9	(Azerbaijan Soviet Socialist Republic) Neftchi Baku	38	13	12	13	42	48	−6	38	
10	(Russian Soviet Federative Socialist Republic) Lokomotiv Moscow	38	10	17	11	35	39	−4	37	
11	(Russian Soviet Federative Socialist Republic) Zenit Leningrad	38	10	14	14	35	49	−14	34	
12	(Russian Soviet Federative Socialist Republic) SKA Rostov-on-Don	38	11	11	16	44	48	−4	33	
13	(Ukrainian Soviet Socialist Republic) Zarya Voroshilovgrad	38	10	13	15	23	41	−18	33	
14	(Ukrainian Soviet Socialist Republic) Shakhtar Donetsk	38	9	14	15	38	42	−4	32	
15	(Kazakh Soviet Socialist Republic) Kairat Alma-Ata	38	12	8	18	33	42	−9	32	
16	(Armenian Soviet Socialist Republic) Ararat Yerevan	38	11	9	18	34	46	−12	31	
17	(Uzbek Soviet Socialist Republic) Pakhtakor Tashkent	38	9	11	18	42	61	−19	29	
18	(Russian Soviet Federative Socialist Republic) Krylya Sovetov Kuybyshev	38	9	11	18	24	45	−21	29	
19	(Georgian Soviet Socialist Republic) Torpedo Kutaisi	38	9	10	19	27	48	−21	28	
20	(Azerbaijan Soviet Socialist Republic) Dynamo Kirovobad (R)	38	5	9	24	25	59	−34	19	Relegation to Class A Second Group

Source: rsssf.com
(C) Champions; (R) Relegated

== Results ==
Home \ Away	ARA	CHO	CSK	DKB	DYK	DMN	DYN	DTB	KAI	KRY	LOK	NEF	PAK	SHA	SKA	SPA	TKU	TOR	ZAR	ZEN
Ararat Yerevan		0–2	1–1	1–0	0–1	2–2	2–1	0–0	0–0	1–0	2–0	4–1	1–0	2–0	2–2	1–1	1–0	1–1	3–0	3–0
Chornomorets Odessa	1–0		1–0	4–0	2–4	2–2	1–0	1–1	2–0	1–1	1–1	1–2	4–1	1–1	1–0	2–2	1–0	2–2	4–0	1–1
CSKA Moscow	1–0	2–2		1–0	0–0	2–1	2–1	3–2	3–0	1–0	2–0	1–2	3–1	3–2	2–0	1–1	2–1	0–2	4–0	1–0
Dynamo Kirovobad	1–0	0–0	1–0		0–0	0–3	1–1	2–0	2–4	0–0	0–1	0–1	1–4	1–1	0–0	0–1	1–1	1–1	0–0	2–3
Dynamo Kyiv	0–0	2–2	2–1	1–0		2–1	2–0	0–0	1–1	1–0	3–1	3–0	2–0	1–1	4–0	1–0	1–0	2–1	1–1	5–2
Dinamo Minsk	1–0	3–2	0–0	2–1	0–0		1–0	0–1	2–0	4–1	2–0	2–2	2–0	1–0	1–0	0–0	4–0	0–3	2–1	2–1
Dynamo Moscow	3–0	1–1	1–1	6–1	1–0	1–0		1–0	1–0	5–1	6–2	0–0	1–0	2–0	1–0	2–1	3–0	3–5	1–0	3–0
Dinamo Tbilisi	5–3	4–0	2–0	2–0	1–1	3–2	0–0		3–0	7–2	0–1	4–0	2–1	1–1	0–0	0–0	1–0	2–2	2–0	1–0
Kairat Alma-Ata	0–0	2–0	0–2	1–0	0–1	2–1	0–1	0–0		0–1	1–0	3–0	4–1	3–1	1–0	1–2	2–0	1–0	2–0	0–2
Krylya Sovetov Kuybyshev	0–1	1–0	0–1	2–1	1–1	0–1	2–2	1–0	2–0		0–0	1–0	2–0	1–1	1–0	0–2	1–1	0–2	1–0	0–2
Lokomotiv Moscow	2–1	0–0	0–0	0–2	0–1	0–0	1–0	0–3	1–0	1–0		1–1	5–0	2–2	4–1	0–2	5–2	1–1	1–1	0–0
Neftçi Baku	2–0	4–0	0–1	1–3	0–0	2–2	2–1	1–0	2–1	1–1	0–1		2–1	1–1	0–1	2–1	2–1	1–1	0–0	2–1
Pakhtakor Tashkent	4–0	1–1	1–1	1–0	0–2	1–2	1–1	0–0	1–1	1–0	1–1	2–1		2–2	2–1	2–2	0–0	0–0	1–0	5–0
Shakhtar Donetsk	1–0	0–2	0–0	3–0	2–3	0–0	0–1	1–0	2–0	1–0	1–1	0–1	3–0		1–1	0–1	0–0	1–0	3–0	0–2
SKA Rostov-on-Don	4–0	4–0	0–1	3–1	2–2	2–2	0–3	1–2	2–1	1–1	1–1	1–0	3–1	1–1		5–2	1–0	1–1	1–1	3–1
Spartak Moscow	3–1	2–0	2–0	2–1	3–3	2–1	2–1	1–0	1–0	1–0	0–0	4–3	4–0	2–1	3–1		2–1	1–5	1–1	4–0
Torpedo Kutaisi	1–0	1–0	0–4	2–1	0–2	0–1	1–0	4–2	1–1	0–0	0–0	0–0	1–2	2–1	1–0	2–0		3–4	0–2	0–1
Torpedo Moscow	2–0	2–0	3–0	3–0	1–1	1–1	1–2	0–2	3–0	0–0	1–0	1–0	2–1	1–0	2–0	3–3	0–0		1–0	1–1
Zarya Voroshilovgrad	1–0	1–1	0–2	1–0	0–2	1–0	0–0	0–0	1–1	1–0	0–0	1–1	2–1	3–1	1–0	1–3	0–1	1–0		0–0
Zenit Leningrad	2–1	1–1	1–1	2–1	1–0	1–1	1–1	0–0	0–0	3–0	1–1	2–2	2–2	0–2	0–1	1–0	0–0	0–1	0–1	

Legend: Blue = home team win; Yellow = draw; Red = away team win.

== Top scorers ==
22 goals

- Berador Abduraimov (Pakhtakor)
- Georgi Gavasheli (Dinamo Tbilisi)

21 goals

- Eduard Streltsov (Torpedo Moscow)

14 goals

- Galimzyan Khusainov (Spartak Moscow)
- Vladimir Kozlov (Dynamo Moscow)

13 goals

- Oleg Kopayev (SKA Rostov-on-Don)

12 goals

- Mikhail Gershkovich (Torpedo Moscow)

11 goals

- Eduard Malofeyev (Dinamo Minsk)
- Anatoliy Puzach (Dynamo Kyiv)
- Demuri Vekua (Torpedo Kutaisi)

== Medal squads ==
(league appearances and goals listed in brackets)

1. FC Dynamo Kyiv

Goalkeepers: Viktor Bannikov (19), Yevhen Rudakov (19).
Defenders: Vasyl Turyanchyk (36 / 3), Volodymyr Levchenko (34 / 1), Vadym Sosnikhin (34), Serhiy Krulykovskyi (26 / 1).
Midfielders: Volodymyr Muntyan (36 / 5), Fedir Medvid (33 / 3), Yozhef Sabo (29 / 6).
Forwards: Vitaliy Khmelnytskyi (37 / 10), Viktor Serebryanikov (34 / 7), Anatoliy Puzach (32 / 11), Anatoliy Pylypchuk (20 / 2), Valeriy Porkuyan (20 / 2), Anatoliy Byshovets (15 / 4).

Manager: Viktor Maslov, Assistants: Mykhailo Koman, Viktor Terentyev.

Transferred out during the season: Yuriy Vankevych (DF, 11), Serhiy Shklyar (MF, 8), Viktor Nazarov (MF, 6/1), Leonid Ostrovskyi (DF, 6), Viktor Kashchey (FW, 4/1), Volodymyr Veremeyev (FW, 3), Anatoliy Bohovyk (MF, 2), Vyacheslav Semenov (MF, 2), Oleksandr Shpakov (DF, 1), Viktor Horoza (MF, 1).
