= Association football at the 1956 Summer Olympics – Men's European Qualifiers =

Men's European Qualifier
Tournament details
- Teams: 8 (from 1 confederation)

Tournament statistics
- Matches played: 4
- Goals scored: 16 (4 per match)

The Men's European Football Qualifiers for the 1956 Summer Olympics were the first qualification tournament for the European football teams.

Beside the hosting Australian team, the International Olympic Committee reserved direct spots for 3 European teams including Poland, Turkey and West Germany. In addition, it provided 4 more spots which were contested among 8 teams including the reigning Olympic champions Hungary.

Team 1	Agg.	Team 2	1st leg	2nd leg
Bulgaria	5–3	Great Britain	2–0	3–3
Yugoslavia	w/o^{1}	Romania	—	—
Hungary	w/o^{2}	East Germany	—	—
Soviet Union	7–1	Israel	5–0	2–1

^{1} Romania withdrew.
^{2} As East and West Germany agreed to compete together at the 1956 Olympics, East Germany withdrew. However, after an agreement for a combined football team fell through, a solely West German one was fielded.

23 October 1955 1956 Olympics – Qualifying	Bulgaria	2–0	Great Britain	Sofia, Bulgaria
	Stefanov 30'; Yanev 61'	Report		Stadium: Vasil Levski National Stadium; Attendance: 45,000; Referee: Giorgio Bernardi (Italy)

12 May 1956 1956 Olympics – Qualifying	Great Britain	3–3 (3–5 agg.)	Bulgaria	London, UK
	Hardisty 12', 62'; Lewis 77' (pen.)	Report	Milanov 28'; Prince 32' (o.g.); Dimitrov 66'	Stadium: Wembley Stadium; Attendance: 30,000; Referee: Giorgio Bernardi (Italy)

Note: Britain lost 5–3 on aggregate, but earned a reprieve to compete in Melbourne

Both Bulgaria and Great Britain advanced.

11 July 1956

Soviet Union	5–0	Israel
Tatushin 2'; Ivanov 26', 71'; Simonyan 45', 78'	Report (ru)

Dynamo Stadium, Moscow
Attendance: 54,000
Referee: Sandy Griffiths (Wales)
31 July 1956

Israel	1–2	Soviet Union
Stelmach 64'	Report (ru)	Tatushin 59'; Ilyin 79'

Ramat Gan Stadium, Ramat Gan
Attendance: 60,000
Referee: Francesco Liverani (Italy)

Soviet Union advanced.
