= Vitaliy Khmelnytskyi =

Ukrainian footballer and coach (1943–2019)

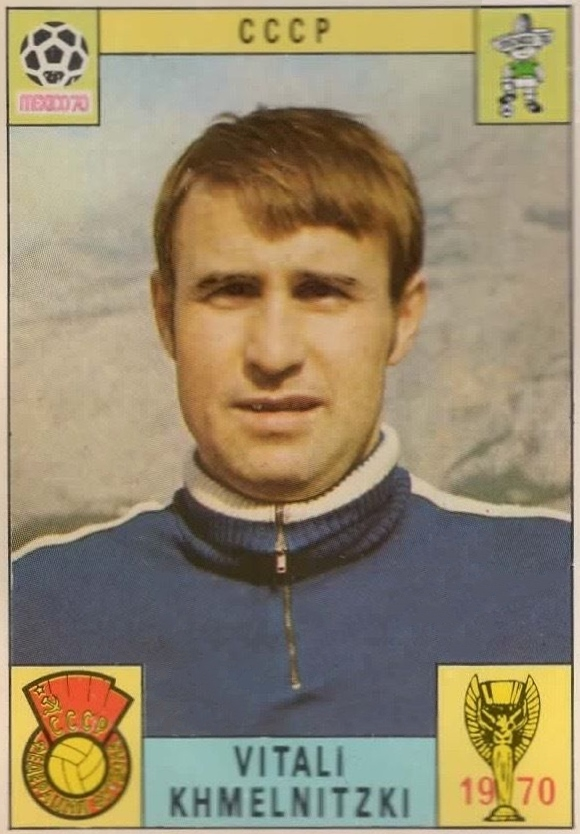

Personal information
- Full name: Vitaliy Hryhorovych Khmelnytskyi
- Date of birth: 12 June 1943
- Place of birth: Tymoshivka, Orichiw gebit, Reichskommissariat Ukraine
- Date of death: 13 February 2019 (aged 75)
- Place of death: Kyiv, Ukraine
- Position: Left winger

Youth career
- Azovmash youth

Senior career*
Years	Team	Apps	(Gls)
1961	Azovstal Zhdanov	18	(3)
1962–1964	Shakhtar Donetsk	73	(8)
1965–1972	Dynamo Kyiv	217	(54)
Total		308	(65)

International career
1965–1971	USSR	20	(7)

Managerial career
- 1973–1974: Granit Cherkasy
- 1978–1979: Kryvbas Kryvyi Rih
- * Club domestic league appearances and goals

Vitaliy Hryhorovych Khmelnytskyi (Ukrainian: Віталій Григорович Хмельницький; 12 June 1943 – 13 February 2019) was a Soviet football player and coach from Ukraine.

== Career ==
=== Playing ===
Khmelnytskyi was born near Huliaipole. His father went missing in action during the World War II. In 1947 Khmelnytskyi family moved to Zhdanov city (Mariupol). While being Ukrainian speaking, due to lack of schools in native language in Mariupol Khmelnytskyi had to study in Russian speaking school (Russification in Ukraine).

The first coaches of Khmelnytskyi was Yevhen Shpinev at Azovstal youth. Khmelnytskyi started his professional career playing for the 1961 Class B (3rd tier) team Azovstal Zhdanov (FC Mariupol). Next year he was invited by Oleh Oshenkov to Shakhtar Donetsk on recommendations of Yevhen Shpinev and Oleh Zhukov. Donning #11 on his jersey, he replaced Valentyn Sapronov. During his career in Shakhtar, Khmelnytskyi missed the chance to earn a trophy as he was not placed for the final match (1962 Soviet Cup Final), while the next year Shakhtar lost it.

Following 1964 season due to determined wish of CSKA Moscow team to obtain him, Khmelnytskyi decided to join Dynamo Kyiv with which he became four times national champion. In transferring of Khmelnytskyi to Dynamo was involved Vladimir Shcherbitsky. In Dynamo Khmelnytskyi who preferred to play with right foot replaced Valeriy Lobanovskyi on the Dynamo's left flank.

First time Khmelnytskyi was ejected during a 1965–66 European Cup Winners' Cup quarterfinal match against Celtic Glasgow in Tbilisi when he hit Jim Craig in a nose.

Due to injuries, Khmelnytskyi retired early in 29.

=== Coaching ===
Soon after retiring, Khmelnytskyi became a coach. He became among the first who enrolled into the Moscow Coaching Courses along with Eduard Malofeyev, Viktor Prokopenko, Pavel Sadyrin, Gennadiy Logofet, Vladimir Fedotov, others. In 1973 Khmelnytskyi was appointed a manager of recently relegated FC Dnipro Cherkasy that lost its status as a "team of masters". Renamed to Hranyt in two seasons the Cherkasy team returned to the Second League. Yet it did not stay there too long as the club in 1974 appeared in a middle of a corruption scandal. This corruption case reached to be dealt at a level of the Central Committee of the Communist Party of Ukraine and feuilleton at the Muscovite newspaper "Pravda" under an eloquent title "Gild the leg".

After coaching Kryvbas, Khmelnytskyi lost interest in managing professional teams and became a sports complex director of the Kyiv factories until eventually received an invitation to become a children coach at the Dynamo football academy.

== Career statistics ==
=== Club ===
Appearances and goals by club, season and competition
Club	Season	League			Cup		Europe		Other		Total	
Club	Season	Division	Apps	Goals	Apps	Goals	Apps	Goals	Apps	Goals	Apps	Goals
Azovstal Zhdanov	Soviet Football Championship				Soviet Cup		–		–		22	3
Azovstal Zhdanov	1961	Class B	20	3	2	0	–		–		22	3
Shakhter Donetsk	1962	Class A	11	1	1	0	–		–		12	1
Shakhter Donetsk	1963	Class A First Group	33	2	4	0	–		–		37	2
Shakhter Donetsk	1964	Class A First Group	29	5	2	0	–		–		31	5
Shakhter Donetsk	Total		73	8	7	0	–		–		80	8
Dinamo Kiev	1965	Class A First Group	29	10	–		4	4	–		33	14
Dinamo Kiev	1966	Class A First Group	31	8	5	0	2	0	–		38	8
Dinamo Kiev	1967	Class A First Group	35	6	1	0	2	0	–		38	6
Dinamo Kiev	1968	Class A First Group	37	10	2	1	–		–		39	11
Dinamo Kiev	1969	Class A First Group	31	8	2	1	2	0	–		35	9
Dinamo Kiev	1970	Class A Top Group	23	5	2	0	–		–		25	5
Dinamo Kiev	1971	Top League	30	7	4	0	–		–		34	7
Dinamo Kiev	1972	Top League	1	0	4	0	–		–		5	0
Dinamo Kiev	Total		217	54	20	2	10	4	–		247	60
Career total			310	65	29	2	10	4	–		349	71

=== International ===
Appearances and goals by national team and year
National team	Year	Apps	Goals
Soviet Union	1965	4	0
Soviet Union	1966	–	
Soviet Union	1967	1	0
Soviet Union	1968	–	
Soviet Union	1969	5	4
Soviet Union	1970	7	1
Soviet Union	1971	3	2
Total		20	7

=== International goals ===
International goals by date, venue, cap, opponent, score, result and competition
No.	Date	Venue	Cap	Opponent	Score	Result	Competition
1	20 February 1969	Estadio El Campín, Bogotá, Colombia	6	Colombia	1–2	1–3	Friendly
2	20 February 1969	Estadio El Campín, Bogotá, Colombia	6	Colombia	1–3	1–3	Friendly
3	25 July 1969	Zentralstadion, Leipzig, East Germany	7	East Germany	1–2	2–2	Friendly
4	16 November 1969	Ali Sami Yen Stadium, Istanbul, Turkey	10	Turkey	1–2	1–3	1970 FIFA World Cup qualification
5	6 June 1970	Estadio Azteca, Mexico City, Mexico	15	Belgium	0–4	1–4	1970 FIFA World Cup
6	18 September 1971	Dynamo Central Stadium, Moscow, Soviet Union	20	India	4–0	5–0	Friendly
7	18 September 1971	Dynamo Central Stadium, Moscow, Soviet Union	20	India	5–0	5–0	Friendly

== International career ==
He capped 20 times for USSR and scored 7 times. Khmelnytskyi played at the 1970 FIFA World Cup. Since he did not fit into the tactical scheme of Nikolai Morozov, Khmelnytskyi missed the 1966 FIFA World Cup and instead of him at the World Cup played Valeriy Porkuyan.

Just before his first match against Greece in Piraeus, Khmelnytskyi had blood running out of his nose due to heat. The away friendly the Soviet team has won 4:1.

== Honours ==
- Soviet Top League winner: 1966, 1967, 1968, 1971
- Soviet Cup winner: 1964, 1966
