= Manuchar Machaidze =

Georgian footballer (born 1949)

Personal information
- Full name: Manuchar Domentis dze Machaidze
- Date of birth: 25 March 1949 (age 77)
- Place of birth: Ambrolauri, Georgian SSR, Soviet Union
- Height: 1.82 m (6 ft 0 in)
- Position: Midfielder

Senior career*
Years	Team	Apps	(Gls)
1967–1980	Dinamo Tbilisi	297	(42)
1980	Pakhtakor Tashkent	13	(1)
1981	Spartak Moscow	2	(0)
1981–1982	Torpedo Kutaisi	45	(6)
Total		357	(50)

International career
1974–1979	USSR	4	(0)
- * Club domestic league appearances and goals

Manuchar Machaidze (Georgian: მანუჩარ მაჩაიძე; Russian: Манучар Доментьевич Мачаидзе, Manuchar Domentyevich Machaidze; born 25 March 1949) is a Georgian former footballer who played as a midfielder for Dinamo Tbilisi, Pakhtakor Tashkent, Spartak Moscow and Torpedo Kutaisi during his club career, and is most famous for his time at Dinamo Tbilisi. His younger brother, Gocha Machaidze, also a footballer, served as a defender and defensive midfielder for the same clubs as him.

A deep-lying playmaker, who was also operated in the classic number 7 position, Machaidze is the only player in the Georgian football history, who lifted the Soviet Crystal Cup as captain twice, first when in 1976 the Georgians made a remarkable performance, winning their first trophy after a smashing 3–0 victory against Ararat Yerevan in the final and second, when after the goalless draw Dinamo Tbilisi defeated Dynamo Moscow 5–4 on penalties in 1979.

Achievements include one Soviet Top League title, two Soviet Cups and favorable results in the national championship. During his period, Dinamo Tbilisi became the Vice-Champion in 1977 and won Soviet Top League silver medals. Also four times, he took the third place and won bronze medals as well as became the Vice-Champion of the football tournament of the Summer Spartakiad of Peoples of the Soviet Union in 1979.

From 1995 to 1999 he was a member of the Parliament of Georgia. In Georgia, he is also known as an amateur artist.

26 March 2013 the Ministry of Sport and Youth Affairs of Georgia awarded him the Highest Sports Title of Georgia — "Knight of Sport".

== Early years ==
Machaidze was born in Ambrolauri. The family lived there only briefly and moved to an apartment house in Tbilisi when he was three.

He started playing football at the age of 12 in Tbilisi. Local well-known specialist Vano Shudra was Machaidze's first coach. He played on the 35th Football School boys team.

== Club career ==
=== Dinamo Tbilisi ===
In 1967, Vyacheslav Solovyov — senior then coach of Dinamo Tbilisi noticed him as a young player and invited him to join the club's reserve team. Machaidze was 18 years old when he played his first game in a Dinamo shirt. He played with the reserves for the whole of 1968 and 1969 seasons and scored 11 goals in 47 games. Machaidze played his first senior game for Dinamo on 1 June 1968 in Tashkent when he was a second-half substitute in their 0–0 draw with Pakhtakor in the 11th round of the Soviet Top League.

He became a regular player in the first team by the 1970 season, playing 18 league games for the club. In that year he also made his Soviet Cup tournament debut in the final game against Dynamo Moscow. The match was held at the Luzhniki Stadium in Moscow on 8 August 1970. More than 100 000 spectators attended this historical game, which was the last Soviet Cup final for the legendary Lev Yashin. It was the second cup final between the two teams (the first one was also held in Moscow on 16 July 1937). Dynamo won the match 2–1. Russian striker Vladimir Eshtrekov scored the first goal at 17th minute and it stayed at 1–0 until half-time. After the break, Gennady Yevryuzhikhin doubled Dynamo Moscow's lead at 17th minute of the second half. Five minutes later Georgian defender Shota Khinchagashvili pulled a goal back at 67th minute — 2–1. This was how it remained until the end of the match, and Muscovites were able to celebrate their fourth Soviet Cup victory.

The following year, Machaidze played all 30 league games, scored 5 goals and won with the club his first domestic honour — Soviet Top League Bronze medal.

== International career ==
Machaidze was capped four times for the Soviet Union, between April 1974 and May 1979. He made his international debut under manager Konstantin Beskov, on 17 April 1974, in a friendly international match, when the Soviet Union beat Yugoslavia 1–0. He played his last national team game on 19 May 1979 in a UEFA Euro 1980 qualifier against Hungary.

== Career statistics ==
=== Club ===
Appearances and goals by club, season and competition
Club	Season	League		Cup		Europe		Total	
Club	Season	Apps	Goals	Apps	Goals	Apps	Goals	Apps	Goals
Dinamo Tbilisi	1968	4	0	–	–	–	–	4	0
Dinamo Tbilisi	1969	6	1	–	–	–	–	6	1
Dinamo Tbilisi	1970	18	0	5	0	–	–	23	0
Dinamo Tbilisi	1971	30	5	2	0	–	–	32	5
Dinamo Tbilisi	1972	21	2	4	0	2	0	28	2
Dinamo Tbilisi	1973	30	4	4	0	6	1	40	5
Dinamo Tbilisi	1974	29	7	8	2	–	–	37	9
Dinamo Tbilisi	1975	29	6	4	2	–	–	33	8
Dinamo Tbilisi	1976	25	4	5	0	4	1	34	5
Dinamo Tbilisi	1977	30	3	1	0	6	0	37	3
Dinamo Tbilisi	1978	30	2	6	0	4	0	40	2
Dinamo Tbilisi	1979	34	7	8	1	4	0	46	8
Dinamo Tbilisi	1980	10	1	7	0	–	–	17	1
Dinamo Tbilisi	Total	297	42	54	5	26	2	377	49
Pakhtakor Tashkent	1980	13	1	–	–	–	–	13	1
Spartak Moscow	1981	2	0	1	0	2	0	5	0
Torpedo Kutaisi	1981	30	6	–	–	–	–	30	6
Torpedo Kutaisi	1982	15	0	3	0	–	–	18	0
Torpedo Kutaisi	Total	45	6	3	0	–	–	48	6
Career total		357	49	58	5	28	2	443	56

=== International ===
Appearances and goals by national team and year
National team	Year	Apps	Goals
Soviet Union	1974	1	0
Soviet Union	1975	–	–
Soviet Union	1976	2	0
Soviet Union	1977	–	–
Soviet Union	1978	–	–
Soviet Union	1979	1	0
Total		4	0

== Honours ==
Dinamo Tbilisi

- Soviet Top League: 1978
- Soviet Cup: 1976, 1979
