= Roker Park =

Football stadium in Roker, England

Coordinates: 54°55′16.68″N 1°22′31.73″W

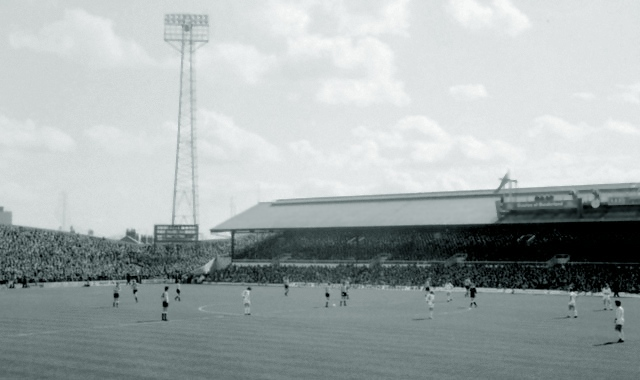
- Kick-off at Sunderland v. Arsenal, August 1976
- Interactive map of Roker Park
- Location: Sunderland, England
- Owner: Sunderland
- Capacity: 22,500; Record attendance: 75,118
- Surface: Grass

Construction
- Opened: 10 September 1898
- Closed: 1997
- Demolished: 1998
- Architect: Archibald Leitch

Tenant
- Sunderland (1898–1997)

Roker Park was a football ground in Roker, Sunderland, England, which was the home of Sunderland from 1898 to 1997, before the club moved to the Stadium of Light.

The stadium's capacity varied throughout its existence. Originally designed to accommodate 60,000 attendees, its capacity was gradually reduced to around 22,500, of which only a small proportion consisted of seated places. Its highest recorded attendance was, however, significantly higher, with the 1932–33 FA Cup match on 4 March 1933 attracting a record crowd of 75,118.

== History ==
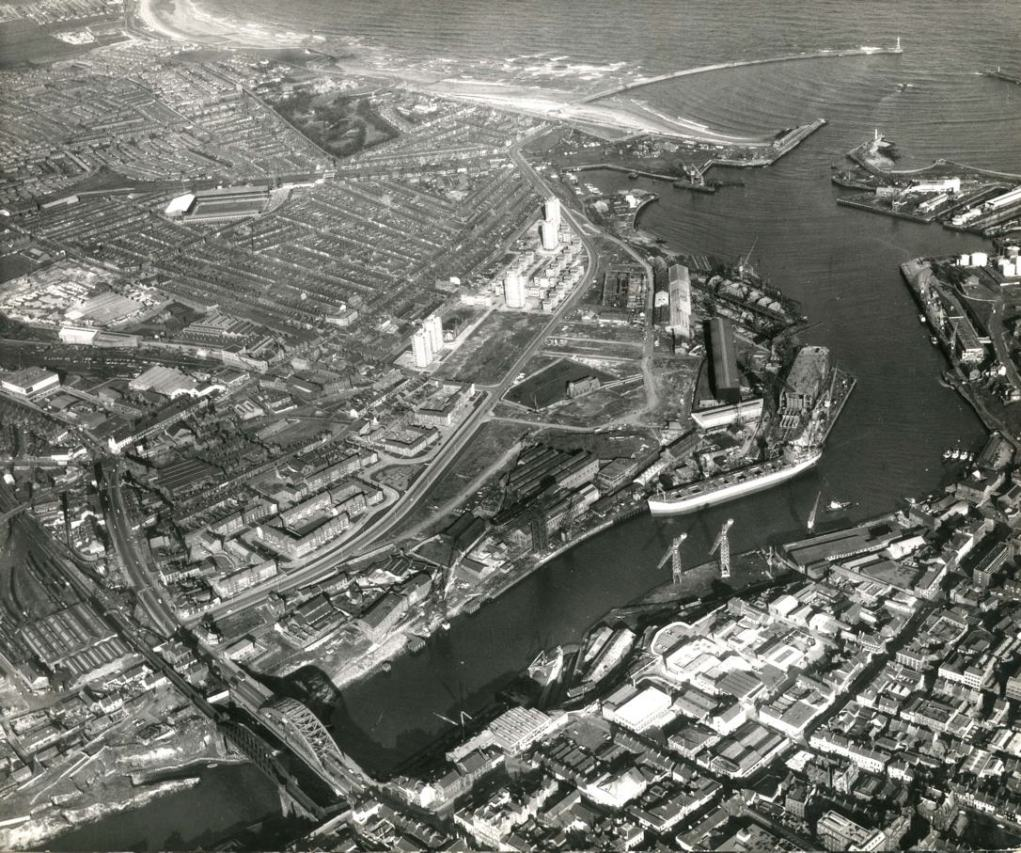
Roker Park (top left) pictured from above in 1967

In the 1890s, the then Sunderland chairman and his brother decided to build a bigger ground for the club, to replace what was then the club's current ground at Newcastle Road. The club had negotiated to buy farmland that belonged to a Mr. Tennant and part of the agreement was that Sunderland would have to build a house on the site as well as their new stadium. Until this house was built, Sunderland still had to pay rent on the land.

Within a year of the land being bought, Roker Park had been built, with the wooden stands only taking three months to build. The Clock Stand had 32 steps, no seats and a crush barrier for safety. The turf was brought from Ireland, and lasted for 38 years. The pitch was designed to have a slight drop of about one foot from the centre of the pitch to each corner to help with drainage. The first event at the ground was an "Olympic Games and Band Contest" on 12 August 1898. On 10 September 1898, Roker Park was officially opened by Charles Vane-Tempest-Stewart, 6th Marquess of Londonderry. The first match was a friendly against Liverpool which Sunderland won 1–0, with Jim Leslie scoring the stadium's first ever goal.

The stadium soon became famous for what was often referred to as the "Roker Roar", with then Tottenham and Northern Ireland captain Danny Blanchflower writing that “Nothing ever equalled the intensity of that wild roar at Roker Park”.

The Roker End was concreted in 1912, and by 1913 the capacity had risen to 50,000. In 1929 the old wooden grandstand was demolished and replaced by a new Main Stand, which was designed by Archibald Leitch, whose influence, the criss-cross lattice work, can still be seen at Ibrox (Rangers), Home Park (Plymouth Argyle) and Goodison Park (Everton). Fragments of the iconic lattice work would later be used to separate parts of the car park at the Stadium of Light. The work on the new Main Stand nearly bankrupted the club. By this time the official capacity of Roker Park was 60,000 but at some matches they would have crowds as large as 75,000. More work continued in the 1930s and in 1936 the Clock Stand was rebuilt. The 114 m (375 ft) long structure was officially opened by Lady Raine, whose husband was Sir Walter Raine, the Chairman of Sunderland AFC at the time.

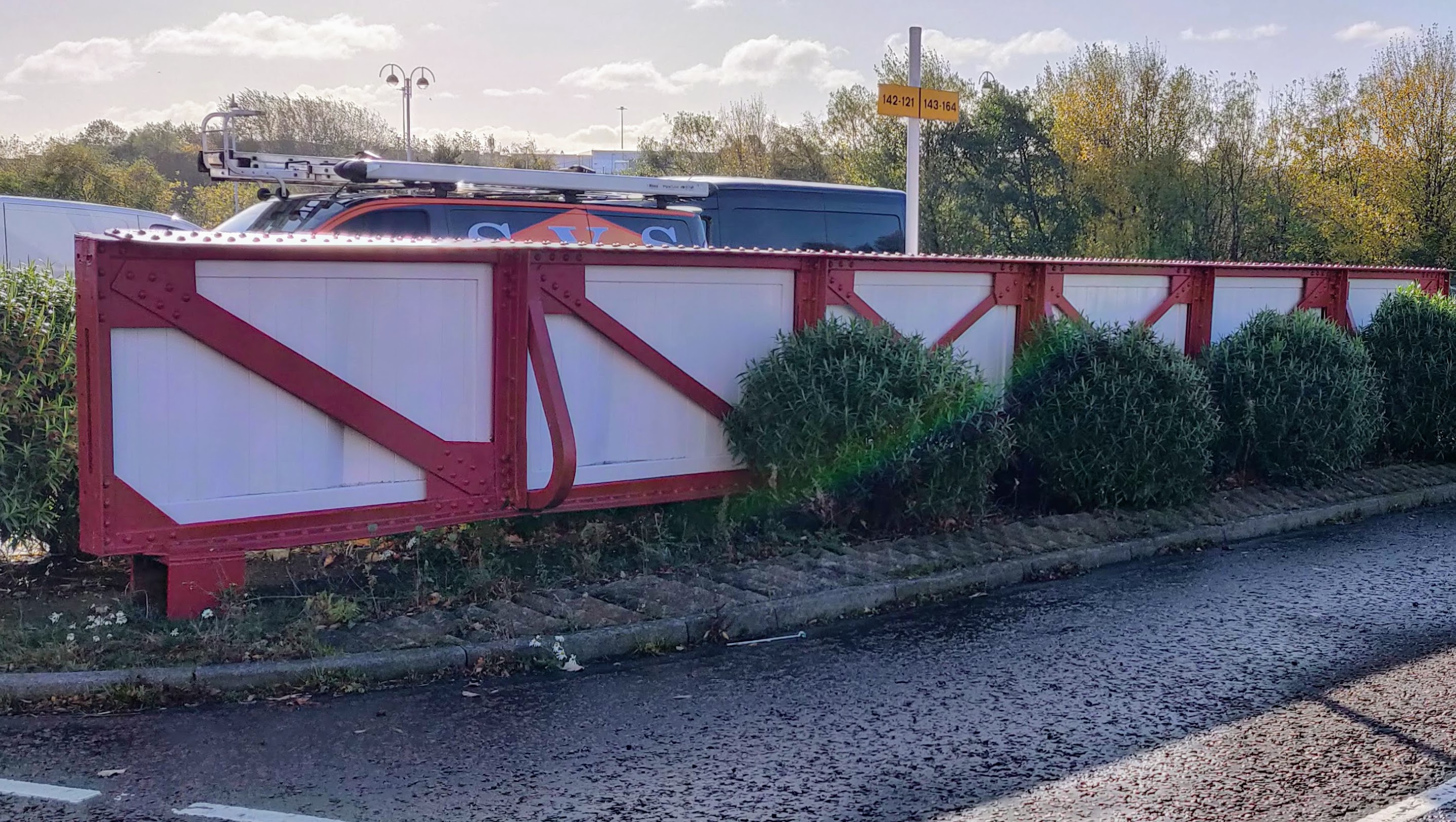
Fragments of the Archibald Leitch lattice work from the Main Stand now form part of the car park at the Stadium of Light.

In 1943, during the Second World War, a bomb landed in the middle of the pitch and another nearby killed a policeman. In 1952, Roker Park was fitted with floodlights, being only the second ground in the country to do so after Arsenal's Highbury. The lights were only a temporary addition, and were replaced by permanent structures at the end of the season after proving to be a success. When England hosted the 1966 World Cup, improvements were made to the Clock Stand, involving the addition of seats, and a roof over the Fulwell End. Temporary seating was also installed in the Fulwell End. The capacity of Roker Park during the World Cup was 40,310.

In 1955, Roker Park hosted an FA Cup semi-final replay, between (eventual winners) Newcastle United and York City, who were then in the third tier of English football. Newcastle won the game 2–0 in front of a crowd of 55,239. Sunderland were in the other semi-final, but lost 1–0 to Manchester City.

During the 1970s, there were even more improvements to Roker Park. These improvements included installing underground sprinklers, upgrading the floodlights to European Standard Lux Value, installing electronic crowd monitoring systems, and re-sheeting the roof. In the 1980s, with a downturn in the club's fortunes (which included a season in the Football League Third Division), Roker Park started to decline. The capacity was severely reduced following the report in the Hillsborough Disaster of 1989, with the Roker End suffering the most.

In the early 1990s, new Football Association (FA) rules following the publication of the Taylor Report meant the stadium would have to have been upgraded to all-seater status, which would have consisted of a much smaller capacity than the sort of attendances that Sunderland could expect, as they had played in the penultimate First Division campaign (1990–91 season) before the creation of the Premier League and were aiming for a swift return to the top flight (although promotion was ultimately not achieved until the 1995–96 season). The site was too confined for expansion so chairman Bob Murray decided to look for a site for a new stadium. In 1992, plans were unveiled to build a 48,000-seat stadium near the Nissan car factory in Washington, which would be part of a mega leisure complex, but Nissan objected to such a site being developed near their factory. Instead, five years later in 1997, Sunderland moved to the Stadium of Light, in nearby Monkwearmouth, on the site of the closed Monkwearmouth Colliery.

The 1996–97 season was the last at Roker Park, which was also Sunderland's first ever season in the Premier League, ending in relegation for the club. The last competitive match at the ground was a 3–0 victory over Everton.

Roker Park was also one of the most recent venues in the Premier League to feature standing accommodation. The only team to have had standing accommodation at its stadium since was Fulham, who still had terracing at Craven Cottage for one season after winning promotion in 2001, after which they ground-shared with QPR at Loftus Road for two seasons before returning to an all-seater Craven Cottage.

In a special ceremony after the final farewell game (coincidentally, also a 1–0 win against Liverpool, in which Sunderland midfielder John Mullin scored the stadium's final goal at the Fulwell End), Charlie Hurley (voted the club's Player of the Century) dug up the centre spot of the ground for it to be planted at the new stadium. Following the move to the Stadium of Light, Roker Park was demolished and in its place was built a housing estate. To commemorate Roker Park, the streets were named Promotion Close, Clockstand Close, Goalmouth Close, Midfield Drive, Turnstile Mews and Roker Park Close.

== Fan reactions to the move ==
Following the demolition of Roker Park, playwright Tom Kelly and actor Paul Dunn created a one-man play called I Left My Heart at Roker Park about a fan struggling with the move and what Roker Park meant for him; the play had its first run in 1997, and has been revived since.

Actor and Sunderland supporter Peter O'Toole described Roker Park as his connection to the club, saying that as a result of the change of grounds he was less of a fan.

In 1998, the BBC broadcast a six-part documentary named Premier Passions, which included a chronicle of Sunderland during the 1996–97 season, in which the club was relegated from the Premier League the year after winning promotion from the Football League First Division, and moved to the Stadium of Light.

== International matches ==
Roker Park hosted the first of three full England internationals in 1899; a 13–2 victory over Ireland in the 1898–99 British Home Championship - the highest scoring game in the history of the tournament. Further Home Championship games were played at Roker Park in 1920 (v. Ireland) and 1950 (v. Wales), England winning both games. Three England B games were played at the ground, in 1954, 1980 and 1990. Roker Park also hosted four youth internationals - England U23 games in 1959 and 1970, and England U18 games in 1952 and 1956. The 1970 England U23 game against Scotland was abandoned due to snow after 60 minutes with England leading 3–1.

During the 1966 FIFA World Cup, Roker Park hosted three group stage games in Group 4 along with Ayresome Park, and a Quarter Final game between the Soviet Union and Hungary. The biggest World Cup attendance at the ground was 27,793 for the group stage game between the Soviet Union and Italy.

=== List of full and B-level Internationals ===
18 February 1899 1899 British Home Championship	England	13–2	Ireland	Sunderland
	Frank Forman 15'; Fred Forman 20', 52'; Charlie Athersmith 21'; Gilbert Smith 32', 59', 60', 63'; Steve Bloomer 40', 89'; Jimmy Settle 53', 55', 80'		Joe McAllen 65' (pen.); James Campbell 88'	Stadium: Roker Park; Attendance: 13,000; Referee: Alexander Hamilton (Scotland)

23 September 1920 1920–21 British Home Championship	England	2–0	Ireland	Sunderland
	Bob Kelly 10'; Billy Walker 47'			Stadium: Roker Park; Attendance: 22,000; Referee: Alexander A. Jackson (Scotland)

15 November 1950 1950–51 British Home Championship	England	4–2	Wales	Sunderland
	Eddie Baily 31', 42'; Wilf Mannion 66'; Jackie Milburn 90'		Trevor Ford 48', 71'	Stadium: Roker Park; Attendance: 55,139; Referee: John Mowatt (Scotland)

3 March 1954 Friendly	England B	1–1	Scotland B	Sunderland
	Hooper		Cumming	Stadium: Roker Park; Attendance: 21,048

13 July 1966 1966 World Cup - Group 4	Italy	2–0	Chile	Sunderland
19:30 BST	Sandro Mazzola 8'; Paolo Barison 88'			Stadium: Roker Park; Attendance: 27,199; Referee: Gottfried Dienst (Switzerland)

16 July 1966 1966 World Cup - Group 4	Soviet Union	1–0	Italy	Sunderland
15:00 BST	Igor Chislenko 57'			Stadium: Roker Park; Attendance: 27,793; Referee: Rudolf Kreitlein (Germany)

20 July 1966 1966 World Cup - Group 4	Soviet Union	2–1	Chile	Sunderland
19:30 BST	Valeriy Porkujan 28', 85'		Rubén Marcos 32'	Stadium: Roker Park; Attendance: 16,027; Referee: John Adair (Northern Ireland)

23 July 1966 1966 World Cup Quarter Final	Soviet Union	2–1	Hungary	Sunderland
15:00 BST	Igor Chislenko 5'; Valeriy Porkujan 46'		Ferenc Bene 57'	Stadium: Roker Park; Attendance: 26,844; Referee: Juan Gardeazábal Garay (Spain)

26 March 1980 Friendly	England B	1–0	Spain B	Sunderland
	Russell Osman			Stadium: Roker Park; Attendance: 14,807

24 April 1990 Friendly	England B	2–0	(Czech Republic) Czechoslovakia B	Sunderland
	Alan Smith (2)			Stadium: Roker Park; Attendance: 15,080

1 November 1995 Euro 1997 qualifying	England	1–1	Italy	Sunderland
	Coultard 33'		Morace 44'	Stadium: Roker Park; Referee: Christine Frai (Germany)
