= 1970 Soviet Top League =

33rd season of top-tier football league in Soviet Union

Soviet Top League
- Season: 1970

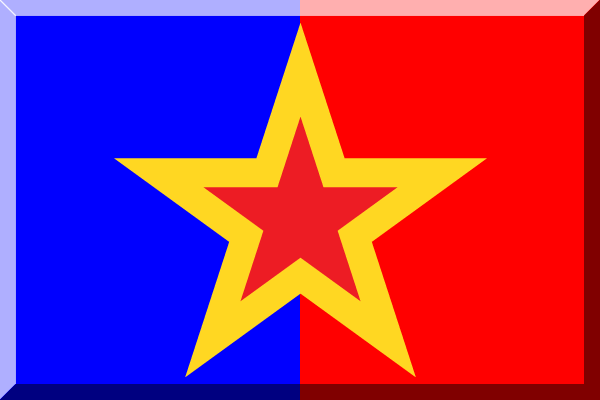
Bicolor flag with a star

17 teams took part in the league with PFC CSKA Moscow winning the championship.

== League standings ==
Pos	Team	Pld	W	D	L	GF	GA	GD	Pts	Qualification or relegation
1	(Russian Soviet Federative Socialist Republic) CSKA Moscow (C)	32	20	5	7	46	17	+29	45	Qualification for European Cup first round
2	(Russian Soviet Federative Socialist Republic) Dynamo Moscow	32	19	7	6	50	22	+28	45	Qualification for Cup Winners' Cup first round
3	(Russian Soviet Federative Socialist Republic) Spartak Moscow	32	12	14	6	43	25	+18	38	Qualification for UEFA Cup first round
4	(Georgian Soviet Socialist Republic) Dinamo Tbilisi	32	14	8	10	43	30	+13	36	
5	(Ukrainian Soviet Socialist Republic) Zarya Voroshilovgrad	32	10	14	8	27	25	+2	34	
6	(Russian Soviet Federative Socialist Republic) Torpedo Moscow	32	12	10	10	36	38	−2	34	
7	(Ukrainian Soviet Socialist Republic) Dynamo Kyiv	32	14	5	13	36	32	+4	33	
8	(Russian Soviet Federative Socialist Republic) SKA Rostov-on-Don	32	9	15	8	28	29	−1	33	
9	(Byelorussian Soviet Socialist Republic) Dinamo Minsk	32	11	10	11	33	29	+4	32	
10	(Ukrainian Soviet Socialist Republic) Shakhtar Donetsk	32	11	8	13	35	50	−15	30	
11	(Azerbaijan Soviet Socialist Republic) Neftchi Baku	32	9	11	12	27	28	−1	29	
12	(Armenian Soviet Socialist Republic) Ararat Yerevan	32	10	9	13	31	34	−3	29	
13	(Uzbek Soviet Socialist Republic) Pakhtakor Tashkent	32	8	12	12	28	46	−18	28	
14	(Russian Soviet Federative Socialist Republic) Zenit Leningrad	32	10	7	15	30	40	−10	27	
15	(Ukrainian Soviet Socialist Republic) Chornomorets Odessa (R)	32	8	10	14	25	38	−13	26	Relegation to First League
16	(Georgian Soviet Socialist Republic) Torpedo Kutaisi (R)	32	6	11	15	24	42	−18	23	Relegation to First League
17	(Russian Soviet Federative Socialist Republic) Spartak Ordzhonikidze (R)	32	7	8	17	31	48	−17	22	Relegation to First League

Source: rsssf.com
(C) Champions; (R) Relegated
- Note: On 5 January 1970 the city of Luhansk was officially renamed again as Voroshilovgrad, therefore Zorya Luhansk became known as Zorya Voroshilovgrad.

== Championship play-off ==
On December 5 and 6 in Tashkent (RSSSF)

- CSKA Moscow – Dynamo Moscow 0:0 and 4:3

== Results ==
Home \ Away	ARA	CHO	CSK	DYK	DMN	DYN	DTB	NEF	PAK	SHA	SKA	SPA	ORD	TKU	TOR	ZAR	ZEN
Ararat Yerevan		1–1	1–2	2–0	1–0	0–1	3–0	3–0	1–0	1–1	1–0	1–1	2–0	2–1	0–0	0–1	1–0
Chornomorets Odessa	2–1		0–2	3–2	2–2	1–2	0–0	1–0	1–1	1–1	1–2	1–0	3–1	1–0	0–0	0–0	1–0
CSKA Moscow	1–2	1–0		1–0	3–1	1–0	1–0	2–0	2–1	2–0	5–1	2–1	1–1	0–0	3–1	4–0	0–0
Dynamo Kyiv	1–1	2–1	1–0		1–0	0–2	2–0	3–1	0–0	3–0	0–1	0–1	1–0	1–2	2–3	0–0	1–0
Dinamo Minsk	3–1	2–0	0–0	1–3		1–1	1–1	2–0	2–0	0–1	0–0	0–0	1–0	1–0	0–0	1–0	5–1
Dynamo Moscow	3–1	1–0	1–0	1–0	1–2		3–1	2–1	1–1	1–2	3–1	0–0	3–0	5–1	2–1	3–0	2–0
Dinamo Tbilisi	2–1	2–0	1–0	2–1	2–1	0–0		1–0	4–0	4–1	2–0	2–0	5–2	2–0	3–0	0–0	1–0
Neftçi Baku	3–0	1–0	1–2	2–0	1–0	0–2	1–0		1–1	2–1	0–0	0–0	1–0	4–1	1–1	1–1	4–0
Pakhtakor Tashkent	2–1	0–0	0–5	1–1	1–2	0–4	2–1	1–0		1–1	2–1	2–2	1–0	0–0	3–2	1–1	0–2
Shakhtar Donetsk	1–0	3–1	1–0	0–1	1–1	0–2	1–1	1–1	3–0		1–0	0–0	1–4	3–1	4–2	0–0	1–0
SKA Rostov-on-Don	2–2	1–0	0–0	0–1	2–1	0–0	2–1	0–0	1–1	0–1		1–0	0–0	0–0	3–3	0–0	3–0
Spartak Moscow	1–1	0–0	2–1	0–0	1–1	4–1	2–1	0–0	1–1	5–0	1–3		5–1	2–0	2–0	2–1	3–0
Spartak Ordzhonikidze	2–0	4–1	0–1	3–2	1–0	1–2	1–1	1–1	0–1	1–0	1–1	1–1		1–2	0–2	0–0	2–2
Torpedo Kutaisi	0–0	0–2	0–1	1–2	1–0	0–0	2–1	0–0	1–4	4–1	0–1	1–1	3–0		2–2	1–3	0–0
Torpedo Moscow	0–0	2–0	1–0	1–0	0–1	1–0	2–1	0–0	2–0	3–1	0–0	2–1	1–2	0–0		0–2	2–1
Zarya Voroshilovgrad	1–0	0–0	0–1	1–2	1–1	1–0	0–0	1–0	1–0	5–1	2–2	0–2	1–0	0–0	4–1		0–0
Zenit Leningrad	2–0	4–1	0–2	1–3	2–0	1–1	1–1	1–0	2–0	3–2	0–0	1–2	2–1	2–0	0–1	2–0	

Legend: Blue = home team win; Yellow = draw; Red = away team win.

== Top scorers ==
17 goals

- Givi Nodia (Dinamo Tbilisi)

15 goals

- Boris Kopeikin (CSKA Moscow)
- Vladimir Kozlov (Dynamo Moscow)

14 goals

- Vladimir Fedotov (CSKA Moscow)

12 goals

- Galimzyan Khusainov (Spartak Moscow)

10 goals

- Valeriy Porkujan (Chornomorets)
- Gennadi Unanov (Zenit)

9 goals

- Yuri Avrutskiy (Dynamo Moscow)
- Eduard Kozinkevich (Shakhtar)
- Anatoli Vasilyev (Dinamo Minsk)
