= Igor Netto =

Russian footballer (1930–1999)

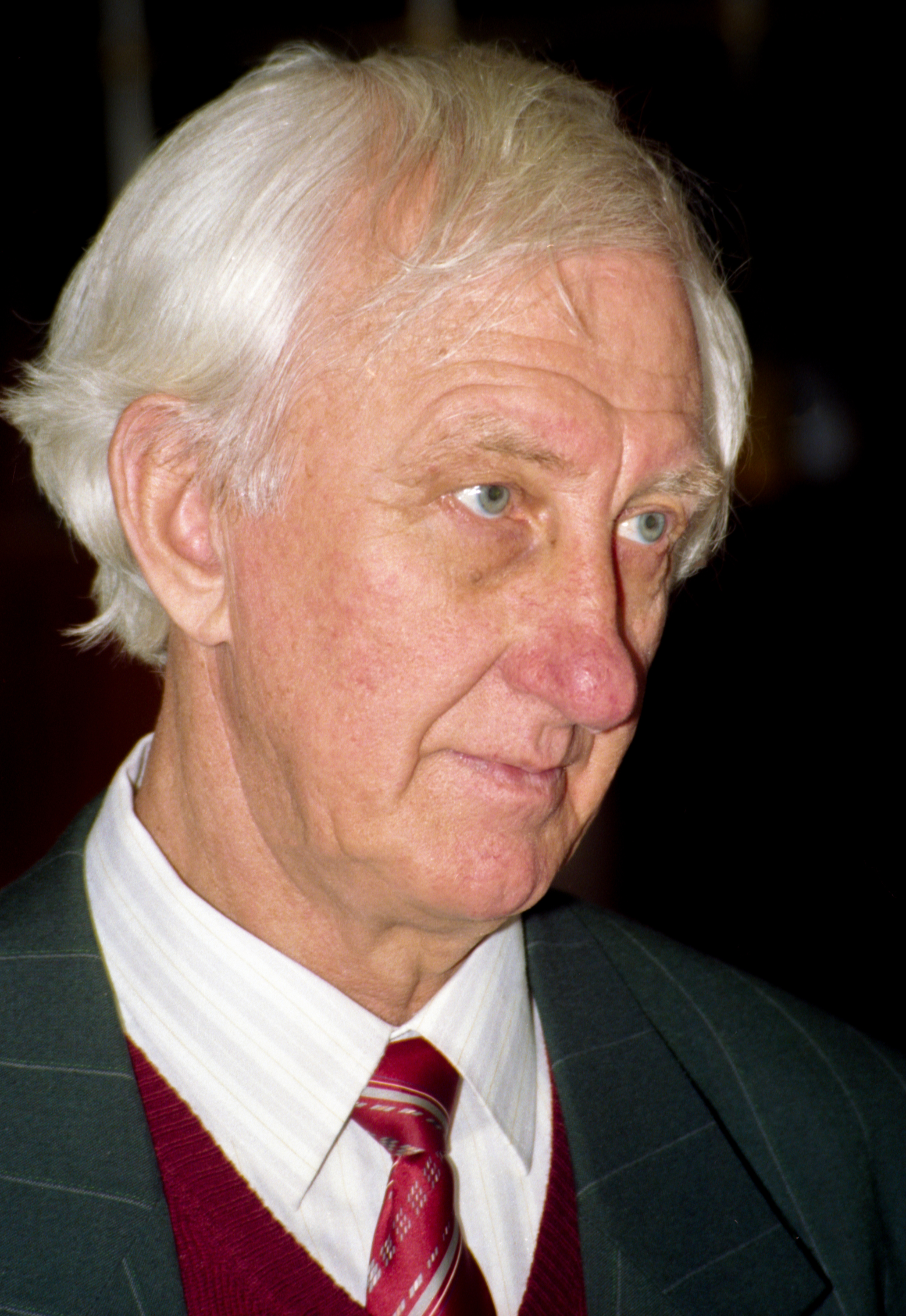
- Netto in 1997

Personal information
- Full name: Igor Aleksandrovich Netto
- Date of birth: 9 January 1930
- Place of birth: Moscow, Soviet Union
- Date of death: 30 March 1999 (aged 69)
- Place of death: Moscow, Russia
- Height: 1.80 m (5 ft 11 in)
- Position: Midfielder

Senior career*
Years	Team	Apps	(Gls)
1949–1966	Spartak Moscow	368	(36)

International career
1952–1965	Soviet Union	54	(4)

Managerial career
- 1967: AC Omonia
- 1968: Shinnik Yaroslavl
- 1969–1970: Iran (assistant)
- 1970–1971: Iran
- 1973–1975: Spartak Moscow (assistant)
- 1975: Spartak Moscow
- 1977: Panionios
- 1979: Neftchi Baku
Medal record
Representing Soviet Union
Olympic Games
Gold medal – first place	1956 Melbourne	Team
European Championships
Gold medal – first place	1960 Paris	Team
- * Club domestic league appearances and goals

Igor Aleksandrovich Netto (Russian: Игорь Александрович Нетто; 9 January 1930 – 30 March 1999) was a Russian footballer, considered one of the country's greatest players ever. He started out playing on the left of defense but, due to his offensive mentality, dribbling and technical abilities turned into a dynamic central midfielder. His versatility and footballing intelligence allowed him to play a number of positions across defense and midfield.

== Ice hockey and club career ==
Besides football, Netto played 22 games in the 1948–49 and 1950–51 seasons as an ice hockey forward for Spartak, but stopped playing to avoid the risk of an injury affecting his football career.

During his club career, he played for Spartak Moscow from 1949 until 1966, scoring 37 goals in 367 league games, and winning five Soviet championships and three national cups.

== International career ==
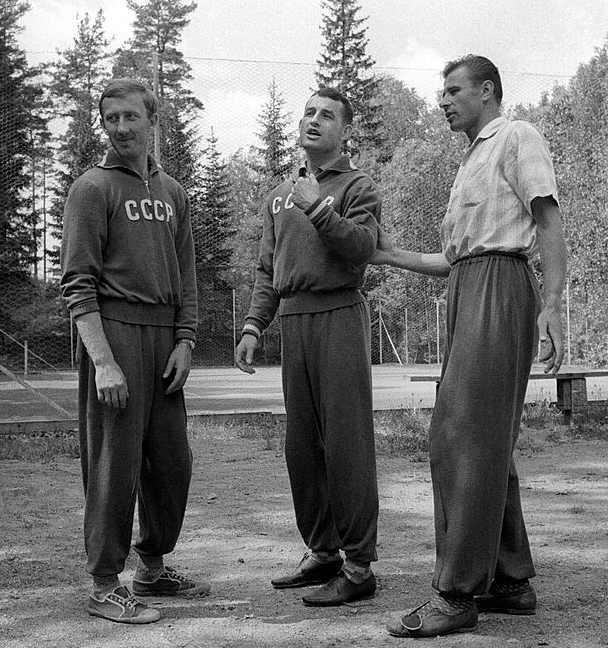
Igor Netto, Sergei Salnikov and Lev Yashin at the 1958 World Cup

He was the captain of the USSR national team from 1952 to 1965. He led the country to the gold medal in the 1956 Summer Olympics, and victory at the first ever European Championship in 1960. He missed all but one match in the 1958 FIFA World Cup due to injury, and also played all four matches in the 1962 FIFA World Cup when the Soviet Union reached the quarterfinals. In total, he collected 54 international caps and scored four goals.

During the 1962 FIFA World Cup match against Uruguay, with the score at 1–1, Igor Chislenko managed to strike through the net, and the resulting goal was mistakenly counted by the referee who had not seen the ball trajectory. Hearing protests from the Uruguayan keeper, Netto confirmed with Chislenko that the ball went through the net, and convinced the referee to discount the goal. USSR still won the game 2–1.

== Managerial career ==
After retiring in 1966, Netto began a career as a coach, training AC Omonia, Shinnik Yaroslavl, Iran, Panionios and Neftchi Baku. He was awarded the Order of Lenin in 1957 for his achievements at the Olympics. The stadium of Spartak Moscow reserves team is named after him.

== Personal life ==
Netto was of Estonian and Italian descent, with his Italian lineage traced to an Italian gardener who emigrated to the Governorate of Estonia in the 18th century. His father Aleksander Netto (1885–1956) was originally a carpenter from Valga, Governorate of Livonia, and his mother Juuli (née Tamm; 1894–1977) was from Vaimastvere, Tartu County. Aleksander left Livonia for Soviet Russia with Red Latvian Riflemen in 1918. Aleksander was a fervent Communist, who acted as a Bolshevik Councilman in Moscow. During the 1930s and Joseph Stalin's Great Purge, the family did not dare to speak Estonian, and Igor learned only Russian. Igor's brother Lev Netto, who spoke Estonian and was named after Lev Trotsky, was a Soviet prisoner for eight years in the Norilsk Gulag, as was also Aleksander's brother Sergei.

Netto was known as goose for his hissing voice, as well as goose-like walk and head shape. On 9 January 1960, he married Olga Yakovleva, an actress. They divorced around 1987 when Netto was suffering from Alzheimer's disease.

== Career statistics ==
Scores and results list the Soviet Union's goal tally first, score column indicates score after each Netto goal.

List of international goals scored by Igor Netto
No.	Date	Venue	Opponent	Score	Result	Competition
1	16 September 1955	Dynamo Stadium, Moscow, Russian SFSR, Soviet Union	India		11–1	Friendly
2	2 December 1956	Olympic Park Stadium, Melbourne, Australia	Indonesia		4–0	1956 Summer Olympics
3	27 July 1957	Dynamo Stadium, Moscow, Russian SFSR, Soviet Union	Finland		2–1	1958 FIFA World Cup qualification
4	15 August 1957	Olympic Stadium, Helsinki, Finland	Finland		10–0	1958 FIFA World Cup qualification

== Honours ==
Spartak Moscow

- Soviet Top League: 1952, 1953, 1956, 1958, 1962
- Soviet Cup: 1950, 1958, 1963

Soviet Union

- Olympic Gold Medal: 1956
- UEFA European Football Championship: 1960

Individual

- UEFA European Championship Team of the Tournament: 1960
- UEFA Jubilee Poll (2004): #71
- The best 33 football players of the Soviet Union (13): No. 1 (1950, 1952–1963), No. 2 (1951)

Preceded by None	UEFA European Championship winning captain 1960	Succeeded by Ferran Olivella; Spain
