= Serhiy Krulykovskyi =

Personal information
- Full name: Serhiy Mykolayovych Krulykovskyi
- Date of birth: 28 November 1945
- Place of birth: Novohrad-Volynskyi, Ukrainian SSR
- Date of death: 2 October 2015 (aged 69)
- Place of death: Odesa, Ukraine
- Height: 1.81 m (5 ft 11 1/2 in)
- Position: Defender

Youth career
- FC Polissya Zhytomyr

Senior career*
Years	Team	Apps	(Gls)
1961–1962	FC Polissya Zhytomyr	?	(?)
1963–1970	FC Dynamo Kyiv	87	(2)
1971–1973	FC Chornomorets Odesa	62	(1)
1974	FC Sudnobudivnyk Mykolaiv	9	(1)
- * Club domestic league appearances and goals

Serhiy Krulykovskyi (Ukrainian: Сергій Миколайович Круликовський; 28 November 1945 – 2 October 2015) was a Soviet-era Ukrainian football player. He was a three-time champion of the USSR as a part of Dynamo Kyiv from 1966 to 1968.

== Career ==
Krulykovskyi started his football career in 1958 as part of a youth league. In 1961, he joined FC Polissya Zhytomyr as part of the Soviet Second League. In 1963, however, he moved on to play for Dynamo Kyiv, but debuted in the 1964 season. His team won the Soviet Cup that year and he was rewarded as the best debutante of that year. He was part of the Soviet Top League from 1966 to 1968. During this time, he played 87 matches and kicked two goals. From 1971 to 1973, however, he played for FC Chornomorets Odesa and afterwards for MFC Mykolaiv.

After he retired from his career, Krulykovskyi coached a children's team in Odesa. He later was a staff member of the Football Federation of Ukraine and also took part in the Ukrainian First League. He died on 2 October 2015.
