= Vadym Sosnykhin =

Ukrainian footballer

Personal information
- Full name: Vadym Oleksandrovych Sosnykhin
- Date of birth: 10 August 1942
- Place of birth: Kyiv, Ukrainian SSR
- Date of death: 28 September 2003 (aged 61)
- Place of death: Kyiv, Ukraine
- Position: Defender

Youth career
- Football School #1 Kyiv
- FC Dynamo Kyiv

Senior career*
Years	Team	Apps	(Gls)
1960–1973	FC Dynamo Kyiv	291	(2)

International career
1966–1967	USSR	4	(0)

Managerial career
- 1974–1991: FC Dynamo Kyiv (youth teams)
- * Club domestic league appearances and goals

Vadym Oleksandrovych Sosnykhin (Ukrainian: Вадим Олександрович Соснихін, Russian: Вадим Александрович Соснихин) (10 August 1942 – 28 September 2003) was a Ukrainian football player. After his playing career together with Yevhen Rudakov worked as a children coach at the Dynamo football school.

== Honours ==
- Soviet Top League winner: 1966, 1967, 1968, 1971.
- Soviet Cup winner: 1964, 1966.

== International career ==
Sosnikhin made his debut for the USSR on 16 October 1966 in a friendly against Turkey.
