= Stanley Prince =

English footballer

Personal information
- Full name: Stanley Terence Prince
- Date of birth: 24 January 1927
- Place of birth: West Ham, England
- Date of death: 20 October 2005 (aged 78)
- Place of death: Newham, England
- Position: Midfielder

Senior career*
Years	Team	Apps	(Gls)
	Walthamstow Avenue	?	(?)

International career
1956	Great Britain	2	(0)
- * Club domestic league appearances and goals

Stanley Terence Prince (24 January 1927 – 20 October 2005) was an English footballer who represented Great Britain at the 1956 Summer Olympics. Prince played as an amateur for Walthamstow Avenue.
