= 1970 FIFA World Cup qualification – UEFA Group 4 =

Football tournament qualification stage

The 1970 FIFA World Cup qualification UEFA Group 4 was a UEFA qualifying group for the 1970 FIFA World Cup. The group comprised Northern Ireland, Soviet Union and Turkey.

== Standings ==
Rank	Team	Pld	W	D	L	GF	GA	GD	Pts
1	Soviet Union	4	3	1	0	8	1	+7	7
2	Northern Ireland	4	2	1	1	7	3	+4	5
3	Turkey	4	0	0	4	2	13	−11	0

== Matches ==
23 October 1968

Northern Ireland	4–1	Turkey
Best 31'; McMordie 47'; Dougan 65'; Campbell 76'	Report	Ogün 9'

Windsor Park, Belfast
Referee: Schalks (Netherlands)

11 December 1968

Turkey	0–3	Northern Ireland
	Report	Harkin 36', 87'; Nicholson 63'

Mithat Paşa Stadium, Istanbul
Referee: Benghanif (Algeria)

10 September 1969

Northern Ireland	0–0	Soviet Union
	Report

Windsor Park, Belfast
Referee: Michel Kitabdjian (France)

15 October 1969

Soviet Union	3–0	Turkey
Muntyan 43', 78'; Nodia 62'	Report

Central Stadium, Kyiv
Referee: Lööw (Sweden)

22 October 1969

Soviet Union	2–0	Northern Ireland
Nodia 24'; Byshovets 79'	Report

Lenin Stadium, Moscow
Referee: Rudolf Scheurer (Switzerland)

16 November 1969

Turkey	1–3	Soviet Union
Ender 24'	Report	Asatiani 3', 60'; Khmelnytskyi 34'

Ali Sami Yen Stadium, Istanbul
Referee: Ferdinand Marschall (Austria)
