= Anatoliy Byshovets =

Ukrainian footballer

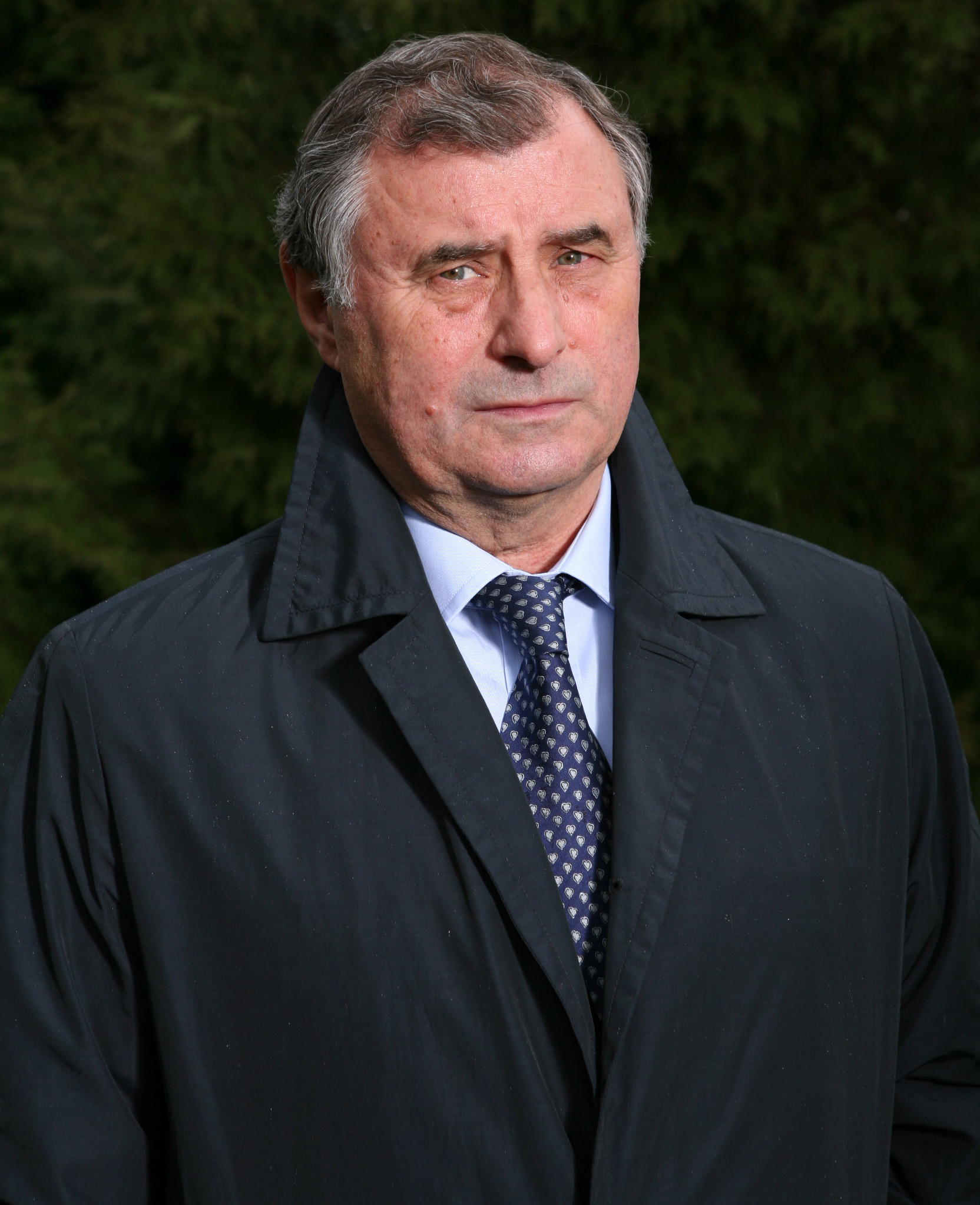
- Byshovets in 2010

Personal information
- Full name: Anatoliy Fyodorovich Byshovets
- Date of birth: 23 April 1946 (age 80)
- Place of birth: Kyiv, Ukrainian SSR, Soviet Union
- Height: 1.76 m (5 ft 9 in)
- Position: Striker

Youth career
- Dynamo Kyiv

Senior career*
Years	Team	Apps	(Gls)
1963–1973	Dynamo Kyiv	139	(49)

International career
1966–1972	Soviet Union	39	(15)

Managerial career
- 1982–1985: Soviet Union (Youth)
- 1986–1988: Soviet Union (Olympic)
- 1988–1990: Dynamo Moscow
- 1990–1992: Soviet Union / CIS
- 1992–1993: AEL Limassol
- 1994: South Korea (advisor)
- 1994–1995: South Korea
- 1995–1996: South Korea (Olympic)
- 1997–1998: Zenit Saint Petersburg
- 1998: Russia
- 1998–1999: Shakhtar Donetsk
- 2003: Marítimo
- 2005: Tom Tomsk
- 2006–2007: Lokomotiv Moscow
- 2009: Kuban Krasnodar (Consultant)
- 2011: Ufa (advisor)
- * Club domestic league appearances and goals

Anatoliy Fyodorovich Byshovets (Russian: Анатолий Фёдорович Бышовец, Ukrainian: Анато́лій Фе́дорович Бишове́ць; born 23 April 1946) is a Soviet and Russian football manager of Ukrainian origin and former Soviet international striker. He played his entire professional career with club side Dynamo Kyiv. He won Olympic gold medal as a coach with the Soviet team at the 1988 Summer Olympics. He was also a manager of the USSR, Russia, and South Korea national teams. At the 1996 Atlanta Olympics, he managed the South Korean U-23 team. He is one of the most successful modern Russian coaches.

== Playing career ==
Byshovets played for the youth team of Dynamo Kyiv, then for their senior team in 1963–1973. Byshovets won the Soviet championship four times (1966, 1967, 1968, 1971) and the Soviet Cup twice (1964, 1966) with them. Byshovets scored four goals for the Soviet Union in the 1970 FIFA World Cup.

== Coaching and administrative career ==
After finishing his playing career in 1973 Byshovets worked in Dynamo Kyiv's football school. In 1988, he won the Olympic gold medal with the Soviet team. He has also managed various clubs and three national teams (USSR, Russia, and South Korea).

Byshovets also was a consultant at Anzhi Makhachkala (2003), vice president at Khimki (2003–2004), and sporting director at Scottish club Heart of Midlothian (2004–2005). He became the first foreign coach of South Korea in 1994.

After having been for one year out of work Byshovets became coach of Lokomotiv Moscow of the Russian Premier League. In 2007, Lokomotiv with Byshovets won the Russian Cup which brought Byshovets a more positive image from both the press and the fans. But despite the club's Champions League ambitions under Byshovets, Lokomotiv was underachieving in the Russian Premier League. Next day after the end of 2007 season he was sacked.

In October 2009, he was hired as a consultant by Kuban Krasnodar. He left Kuban just over a month later, on 17 November 2009, and the club was subsequently disbanded.

== Career statistics ==
No.	Date	venue	Opponent	Score	Result	Competition
1.	11 June 1967	Moscow, Soviet Union	Austria	2–0	4–3	UEFA Euro 1968 qualifying
2.	11 May 1968	Moscow, Soviet Union	Hungary	3–0	3–0	UEFA Euro 1968 quarter-finals
3.	22 October 1969	Moscow, Soviet Union	Northern Ireland	2–0	2–0	1970 FIFA World Cup qualification
4.	6 June 1970	Mexico City, Mexico	Belgium	1–0	4–1	1970 FIFA World Cup
5.	6 June 1970	Mexico City, Mexico	Belgium	3–0	4–1	1970 FIFA World Cup
6.	10 June 1970	Mexico City, Mexico	El Salvador	1–0	2–0	1970 FIFA World Cup
7.	10 June 1970	Mexico City, Mexico	El Salvador	2–0	2–0	1970 FIFA World Cup
8.	13 October 1971	Belfast, Northern Ireland	Northern Ireland	1–1	1–1	UEFA Euro 1972 qualifying
