= Yuri Kuznetsov (footballer, born 1931) =

Soviet footballer and coach

Personal information
- Full name: Yuri Konstantinovich Kuznetsov
- Date of birth: 2 August 1931
- Place of birth: Baku, Azerbaijan, USSR
- Date of death: 4 March 2016 (aged 84)
- Place of death: Moscow, Russia
- Height: 1.72 m (5 ft 8 in)
- Position: Striker

Youth career
- Trudovye Rezervy Baku

Senior career*
Years	Team	Apps	(Gls)
1952–1955	Neftyanik Baku	71	(25)
1955–1959	FC Dynamo Moscow	23	(13)
1960–1965	Neftyanik Baku	126	(26)

International career
1955	USSR	3	(3)

Managerial career
- 1966–1969: FC Dynamo Moscow (assistant)
- 1970–1971: Gwardia Warszawa
- 1977–1978: FC Dynamo Moscow (assistant)
- 1988: Neftchi Baku
- * Club domestic league appearances and goals

Yuri Konstantinovich Kuznetsov (Russian: Юрий Константинович Кузнецов; 2 August 1931 – 4 March 2016) was a Soviet football player and coach.

== Honours ==
- Soviet Top League winner: 1955, 1957, 1959.

== International career ==
Kuznetsov made his debut for USSR on 21 August 1955 in a friendly against West Germany. He scored goals in the next two national team games, but did not represent USSR after that.

== Career statistics ==
=== International goals ===
#	Date	Venue	Opponent	Score	Result	Competition
1.	16 September 1955	Dynamo Stadium, Moscow, Soviet Union	India	11–1	Win	Friendly
2.	16 September 1955	Dynamo Stadium, Moscow, Soviet Union	India	11–1	Win	Friendly
3.	25 September 1955	Népstadion, Budapest, Hungary	Hungary	1–1	Draw	Friendly
Correct as of 21 December 2012
