= Volodymyr Levchenko =

Soviet Ukrainian footballer

Personal information
- Full name: Volodymyr Maksymovych Levchenko
- Date of birth: 18 February 1944
- Place of birth: Kyiv, Ukrainian SSR
- Date of death: April 2006 (aged 62)
- Position: Defender

Youth career
- FC Dynamo Kyiv

Senior career*
Years	Team	Apps	(Gls)
1962–1971	FC Dynamo Kyiv	142	(2)

International career
1968	USSR	3	(0)
- * Club domestic league appearances and goals

Volodymyr Maksymovych Levchenko (Ukrainian: Володимир Максимович Левченко; 18 February 1944 in Kyiv – April 2006) was a Soviet Ukrainian footballer.

== Honours ==
- Soviet Top League winner: 1966, 1967, 1968.
- Soviet Cup winner: 1964, 1966.

== International career ==
He earned 3 caps for the USSR national football team, and participated in UEFA Euro 1968.
