= Anatoli Isayev =

Soviet footballer

Personal information
- Full name: Anatoli Konstantinovich Isayev
- Date of birth: 14 July 1932
- Place of birth: Moscow, USSR
- Date of death: 10 July 2016 (aged 83)
- Place of death: Moscow, Russia
- Position: Forward

Youth career
- 1949–1951: Salyut Moscow

Senior career*
Years	Team	Apps	(Gls)
1952–1953	VVS Moscow	4	(1)
1953–1962	FC Spartak Moscow	159	(54)
1963–1964	FC Shinnik Yaroslavl	53	(15)

International career
1955–1957	USSR	16	(6)

Managerial career
- 1965–1967: FC Spartak Moscow (youth teams)
- 1967–1972: FC Spartak Moscow (assistant)
- 1973: FC Spartak Moscow (youth teams)
- 1974: FC Ararat Yerevan (assistant)
- 1975–1976: FC Spartak Moscow (youth teams)
- 1977: FC Spartak Moscow (assistant)
- 1976–1989: USSR U-17 (assistant)
- 1980–1984: Tekstilshchik Ivanovo
- 1985–1987: FC Rotor Volgograd
- 1987–1988: Tekstilshchik Ivanovo
- 1989–1991: Geolog Tyumen (director)
- 1990: Iraq Olympic team
- 1990–1991: USSR Olympic team
- 1992–1993: Russia U-21
- 1992–1994: FC Rotor Volgograd
- 1996–1997: Geolog Tyumen (assistant)
- * Club domestic league appearances and goals

Anatoli Isayev
Medal record

Representing the Soviet Union

Men's football

Olympic Games
Gold medal – first place	1956 Melbourne	Team

Anatoli Konstantinovich Isayev (Russian: Анатолий Константинович Исаев; 14 July 1932 – 10 July 2016) was a Soviet football player and Soviet and Russian coach.

== Honours ==
- Olympic champion: 1956.
- Soviet Top League winner: 1953, 1956, 1958, 1962.
- Soviet Cup winner: 1958.
- Honored Master of Sports of the USSR: 1957
- Order "For Merit to the Fatherland", 4th class

== International career ==
Isayev made his debut for USSR on 21 August 1955 in a friendly against West Germany. He played in the 1958 FIFA World Cup qualifiers but was not selected for the final tournament squad.
