= Sergei Salnikov =

Soviet footballer (1925–1984)

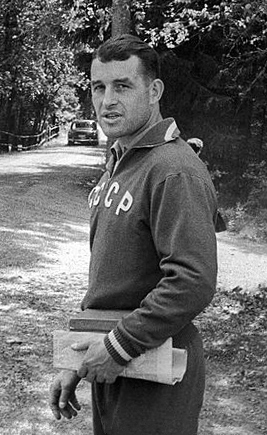
- Salnikov at the 1958 World Cup

Personal information
- Full name: Sergei Sergeyevich Salnikov
- Date of birth: 13 September 1925
- Place of birth: Krasnodar, Russian SFSR, Soviet Union
- Date of death: 9 May 1984 (aged 58)
- Place of death: Moscow, Russian SFSR, Soviet Union
- Height: 1.78 m (5 ft 10 in)
- Position: Striker

Senior career*
Years	Team	Apps	(Gls)
1942–1943	Spartak Moscow	1	(0)
1944–1945	Zenit Leningrad	20	(8)
1946–1949	Spartak Moscow	88	(29)
1950–1954	FC Dynamo Moscow	112	(29)
1955–1960	Spartak Moscow	112	(35)
Total		333	(101)

International career
1954–1958	USSR	20	(11)

Managerial career
- 1964: Trud Voronezh
- 1964–1966: Spartak Moscow (assistant)
- 1967: Spartak Moscow
- 1967–1969: Spartak Moscow (assistant)
- 1976–1977: Afghanistan
Medal record
Representing Soviet Union
Olympic Games
Gold medal – first place	1956 Melbourne	Team
- * Club domestic league appearances and goals

Sergei Sergeyevich Salnikov (Russian: Серге́й Серге́евич Сальников; 13 September 1925 – 9 May 1984) was a Russian footballer who played for Zenit Leningrad, Spartak Moscow and Dynamo Moscow. He was part of the Soviet Union national team that won the gold medal at the 1956 Summer Olympics.

== Club career ==
After two years with Zenit Leningrad, during which he scored against Spartak Moscow in the semifinal of the 1944 Soviet Cup, which Zenit ultimately won, Salnikov joined Spartak as a 21-year-old in 1946. He won the Cup with Spartak in 1946 and 1947. Salnikov scored two goals and made another in the final match of the 1949 season against Dynamo Moscow, when Spartak narrowly missed out on the Soviet Top League title in a 5–4 defeat that some consider the greatest match of the era.

Salnikov's stepfather was arrested and sent to a labour camp in 1949. Salnikov, fearful for his health, made representations to have him transferred to an ordinary prison, and was allegedly told that it would help his case if he moved from Spartak to Dynamo Moscow. He joined Dynamo Moscow in 1950 and, although unhappy, was part of the first choice lineup between 1950 and 1954, making 113 appearances and scoring 29 goals. He was part of the Dynamo team that won the Cup in 1953 and the Soviet Top League in 1954. In 1955, with his stepfather out of danger, he returned to Spartak, where he remained until his retirement in 1960, winning the League again in 1956, and the League and Cup double in 1958. In the course of his two spells at Spartak, Salnikov made 201 appearances and scored 64 goals. Spartak star Nikita Simonyan considered Salnikov as one of the "golden generation" of Soviet players in the 1950s and 1960s. He scored a total of 138 goals for club and country, and as of 2019 is ranked 26th in the Grigory Fedotov club, a list of Soviet and Russian players that have scored 100 or more goals.

== International career ==
Salnikov made his debut for the USSR on 8 September 1954 in a friendly against Sweden. He was on the USSR team that won the football event at the 1956 Summer Olympics, where he scored two goals in the quarterfinal match against Indonesia, and also played at the 1958 World Cup, where his team reached the quarter-finals. He made 20 appearances in all for his country, scoring 11 goals.

== Personal life ==
Salnikov is the father of Soviet Fed Cup player Julia Salnikova and the grandfather of the Greek tennis players Stefanos Tsitsipas and Petros Tsitsipas.

== Honours ==
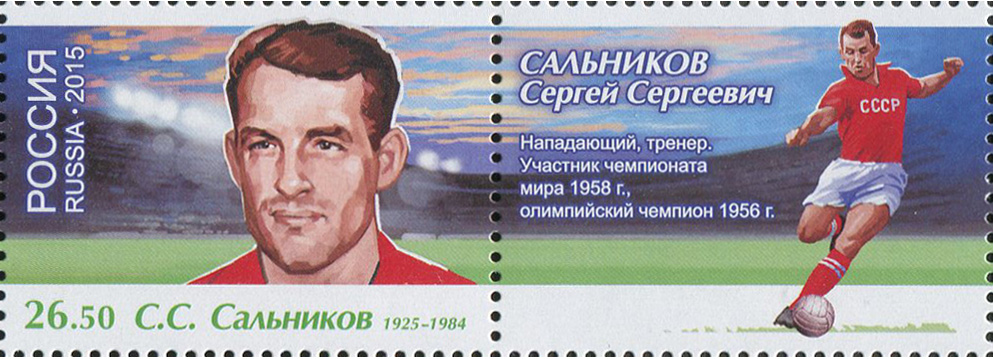
Salnikov on a 2016 Russian stamp from the series "Football Legends"

- Olympic champion: 1956.
- Soviet Top League winner: 1954, 1956, 1958.
- Soviet Cup winner: 1944, 1946, 1947, 1953, 1958.
- Grigory Fedotov club member.
