= Jack Clough (referee) =

English football referee

John Holden "Jack" Clough was an international football referee who officiated the 1957 Coupe de France Final and the 1959 FA Cup Final, and also 1958 FIFA World Cup qualification play-off between USSR and Poland.

== Career ==
He was based in Bolton, a town in the North West of England. A FIFA recognised referee who officiated many matches at international level, Clough was invited to referee the 1957 Coupe de France Final between Toulouse and Angers at Stade Olympique Yves-du-Manoir in Colombes. He was the first and only foreign person to officiate the final of French football's premier cup competition. Two years later, Clough was the referee for the 1959 FA Cup Final between Nottingham Forest and Luton Town at Wembley Stadium in London.

== See also ==
- FA Cup Final referees
