= Anatoli Ilyin =

Russian footballer

- Ilyin on a 2016 commemorative stamp

Personal information
- Full name: Anatoli Mikhaylovich Ilyin
- Date of birth: 27 June 1931
- Place of birth: Moscow, USSR
- Date of death: 10 February 2016 (aged 84)
- Place of death: Moscow, Russia
- Height: 1.77 m (5 ft 10 in)
- Position: Striker

Youth career
- 1945: Pischevik Moscow
- 1946–1948: Trudovye Rezervy Moscow

Senior career*
Years	Team	Apps	(Gls)
1949–1962	FC Spartak Moscow	224	(83)

International career
1952–1959	Soviet Union	31	(16)
Medal record
Olympic Games
Representing Soviet Union
Gold medal – first place	1956 Melbourne	Team
- * Club domestic league appearances and goals

Anatoli Mikhaylovich Ilyin (Russian: Анатолий Михайлович Ильин; 27 June 1931 – 10 February 2016) was a Soviet Russian footballer.

== Honours ==
- Olympic champion: 1956.
- Soviet Top League winner: 1952, 1953, 1956, 1958, 1962.
- Soviet Top League runner-up: 1954, 1955.
- Soviet Top League bronze: 1957, 1961.
- Soviet Cup winner: 1958.
- Soviet Top League top scorer: 1954 (11 goals), 1958 (20 goals).
- Grigory Fedotov club member.

== International career ==
He earned 31 caps and scored 16 goals for the Soviet Union from 1952 to 1959. He earned an Olympic gold medal at the 1956 Summer Olympics, scoring the game-winning goal of the Gold Medal match, and also participated in the 1958 FIFA World Cup.

Ilyin also scored the first goal in the history of the UEFA European Championship, scoring a goal 4 minutes into a qualifying game against Hungary in 1958.
