= Boris Tatushin =

Soviet footballer and manager (1933–1998)

Personal information
- Full name: Boris Georgiyevich Tatushin
- Date of birth: 31 March 1933
- Place of birth: Moscow, USSR
- Date of death: 15 January 1998 (aged 64)
- Place of death: Moscow, Russia
- Position: Striker

Youth career
- Burevestnik Moscow

Senior career*
Years	Team	Apps	(Gls)
1953–1958	FC Spartak Moscow	104	(37)
1961	FC Spartak Moscow	12	(1)
1962–1963	FC Moldova Kishinyov	37	(5)

International career
1954–1957	USSR	25	(7)

Managerial career
- 1975–1977: FC Spartak Oryol
- 1978–1979: FC Khimik Novomoskovsk
- 1980: FC Luch Vladivostok
- * Club domestic league appearances and goals

Olympic medal record

Representing Soviet Union

Men's Football
Gold medal – first place	1956 Melbourne	Team competition

Boris Georgiyevich Tatushin (Russian: Борис Георгиевич Татушин) (31 March 1933 in Moscow; – 15 January 1998 in Moscow) was a Soviet football player and manager.

== Honours ==
- Olympic champion: 1956.
- Soviet Top League winner: 1953, 1956, 1958.

== International career ==
Tatushin made his debut for USSR on 8 September 1954 in a friendly against Sweden. He played in the 1958 FIFA World Cup qualifiers, but was not selected for the final tournament squad, because he was arrested with Eduard Streltsov and Mikhail Ogonkov over rape allegations and was disqualified for three years.
