= Igor Chislenko =

Soviet footballer (1939–1994)

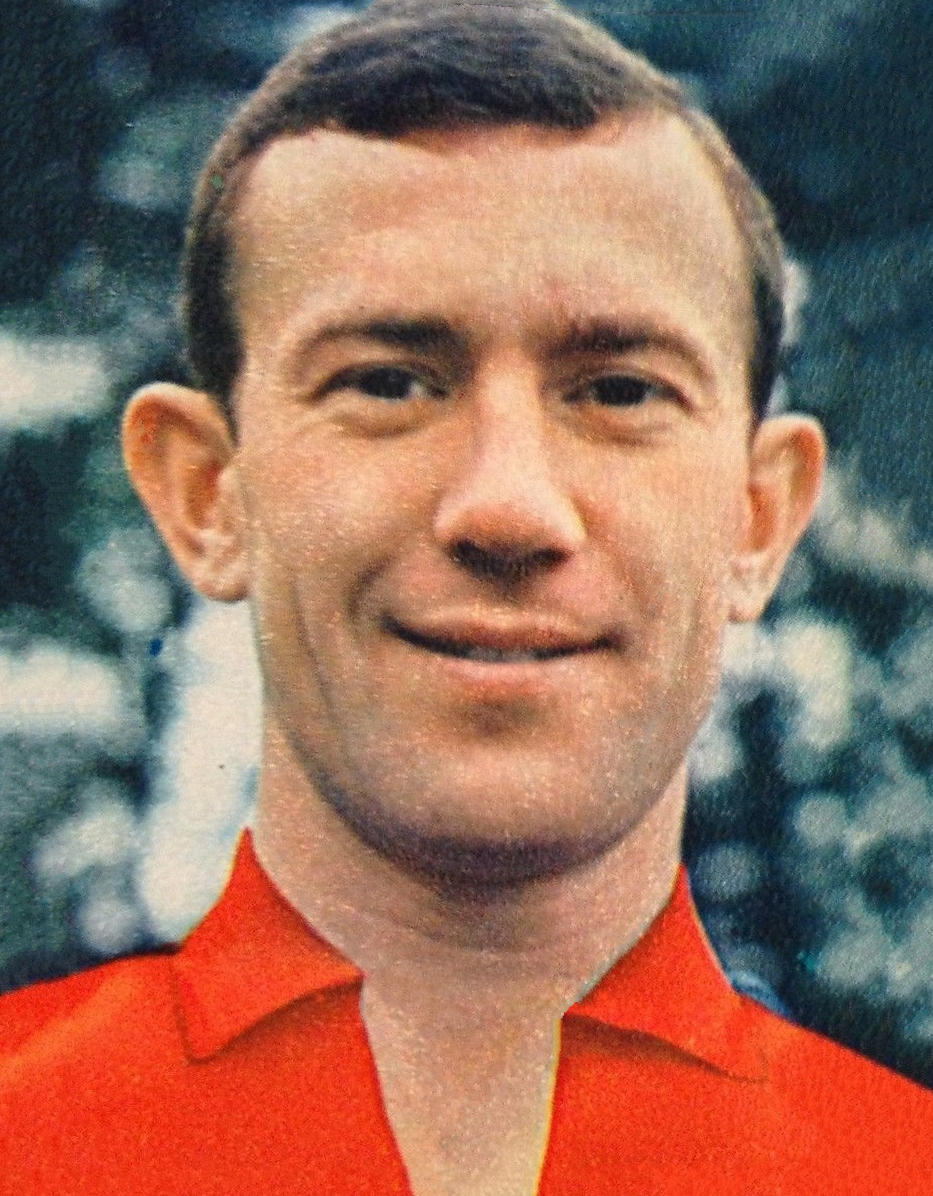
- Chislenko in 1966

Personal information
- Full name: Igor Leonidovich Chislenko
- Date of birth: 4 January 1939
- Place of birth: Moscow, Russian SFSR, Soviet Union
- Date of death: 22 September 1994 (aged 55)
- Place of death: Moscow, Russia
- Height: 1.71 m (5 ft 7 in)
- Position: Forward

Senior career*
| Years | Team | Apps | (Gls) |
| 1957 | FShM Moscow | | |
| 1957–1970 | Dynamo Moscow | 229 | (68) |
| 1971 | Dynamo Tselinograd | | (3) |

International career
| 1959–1968 | USSR | 53 | (20) |
Medal record
Representing Soviet Union
UEFA European Championship
| Runner-up | 1964 Spain |
- * Club domestic league appearances and goals

Igor Leonidovich Chislenko (Russian: Игорь Леонидович Численко, 4 January 1939 — 22 September 1994) was a Soviet association football player. He played over 200 league games for Dynamo Moscow, winning two Soviet league titles and the Soviet Cup on one occasion. He also played for the USSR national team, appearing 53 times, and scoring 20 goals. He was on the 1962 and 1966 World Cup teams.

== Honours ==
Dynamo Moscow

- Soviet Top League: 1959, 1963
- Soviet Cup: 1966–67

Individual

- The best 33 football players of the Soviet Union (8): No. 1 (1963, 1964, 1966), No. 2 (1960-1962, 1965), N/A (1967)
- FUWO European Team of the Season: 1967
