= Givi Nodia =

Georgian footballer (1948–2005)

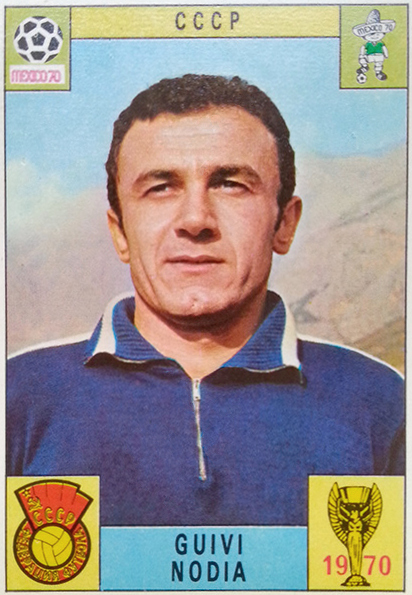
- Nodia 1970

Personal information
- Full name: Givi Georgiyevich Nodia
- Date of birth: 2 January 1948
- Place of birth: Kutaisi, Georgian SSR, Soviet Union
- Date of death: 7 April 2005 (aged 57)
- Place of death: Tbilisi, Georgia
- Height: 1.68 m (5 ft 6 in)
- Position: Striker

Youth career
- Torpedo Kutaisi

Senior career*
Years	Team	Apps	(Gls)
1965–1966	Torpedo Kutaisi	36	(9)
1967–1975	Dinamo Tbilisi	210	(75)
1976–1978	Lokomotiv Moscow	68	(9)
Total		314	(93)

International career
1967–1973	USSR	21	(5)

Managerial career
- 1980–1981: Dinamo Tbilisi (assistant)
- 1982: Torpedo Kutaisi
- 1983: Dinamo Tbilisi (assistant)
- 1984–1986: Torpedo Kutaisi
- 1987: Dinamo Tbilisi (assistant)
- 1988–1992: Gorda Rustavi
- 1993: Dinamo Tbilisi (assistant)
- 1993–1994: Dinamo Tbilisi
- 1995–2000: Lokomotiv St. Petersburg
- 2001: Locomotive Tbilisi
- 2001: Dinamo Tbilisi
- 2002–2003: Dinamo Tbilisi (director of football)
- * Club domestic league appearances and goals

Givi Georgiyevich Nodia (Georgian: გივი ნოდია; Russian: Гиви Георгиевич Нодия; 2 January 1948 – 7 April 2005) was a Soviet Georgian association football player.

== Honours ==
- Soviet Top League bronze: 1967, 1969, 1971, 1972
- Soviet Top League top scorer: 1970
- Grigory Fedotov Club member
- UEFA Euro 1972 runner-up

== International career ==
Nodia made his debut for USSR on 29 November 1967 in a friendly against the Netherlands. He was selected for the UEFA Euro 1968 squad, but did not play in any games at the tournament. He played at the 1970 FIFA World Cup, making history as the first player in World Cup history to receive a yellow card. He also played at UEFA Euro 1972, where USSR were the runners-up.
