= Valeriy Porkujan =

Ukrainian footballer

Personal information
- Full name: Valeriy Semenovych Porkuyan
- Date of birth: 4 October 1944 (age 82)
- Place of birth: Kirovohrad, Ukrainian SSR, Soviet Union
- Height: 1.72 m (5 ft 7 1/2 in)
- Position: Forward

Youth career
- 1958–1962: Zirka Kirovohrad

Senior career*
Years	Team	Apps	(Gls)
1962–1964	Zirka Kirovohrad	?	(21)
1965–1966	Chornomorets Odesa	21	(3)
1966–1970	Dynamo Kyiv	58	(12)
1970–1972	Chornomorets Odesa	64	(18)
1972–1975	Dnipro Dnipropetrovsk	103	(18)

International career
1966–1970	USSR	8	(4)

Managerial career
- 1976: Tavriya Simferopol
- 1977–1978: Okean Kerch
- 1982–1983: Chornomorets Odesa
- 1983–1993: Blaho Blahoeve
- 1994–1999: Chornomorets Odesa
- 1999–2000: Chornomorets-2 Odesa
- 2002–2017: Chornomorets Odesa (assistant)
- * Club domestic league appearances and goals

Valeriy Semenovych Porkuyan (Ukrainian: Валерій Семенович Поркуян, born 4 October 1944) is a Ukrainian former footballer who played as a forward for several clubs in the Soviet Union, including Dynamo Kyiv, and the USSR national football team.

== Playing career ==
=== Club ===
Porkuyan began playing for the youth team of Kirovohrad's local club, Zvezda. In 1962 he made the transition to the senior team of Zvezda. After three successful seasons there he was spotted by a former Chernomorets Odesa player and then assistant coach, Matvey Cherkassky, who helped him transfer from the Soviet Second League B to the Soviet Top League club Chernomorets. That season he played alongside Valeri Lobanovsky, who was finishing up his playing career in Odesa. His form there attracted the attention of many top clubs, including Spartak Moscow and Dnipro, but he was eventually moved to Dynamo Kyiv. At 21 years of age he made the first team in his first season with the team. On the strength of that first season, when he scored 7 goals, he was chosen by the head-coach of USSR national football team, Nikolai Morozov to travel to the 1966 FIFA World Cup. Porkuyan won three Soviet Top League championships with Dynamo Kyiv (in 1966, 1967 and 1968), as well as the Soviet Cup in 1966. But despite those triumphs he failed to secure a spot in a very competitive team at the time. In 1970, he made a return to Odesa to once again play with Chornomorets. He had two solid seasons there, despite the club being relegated to the Soviet First League. In 1972, he was invited to move to Dnipro, who were coached by his former teammate Valeri Lobanovsky. He made the majority of his playing appearances with Dnipro in the 4 years he spent there. He retired from playing in 1976.

=== International ===
Porkuyan earned 8 caps and scored 4 goals for the USSR national football team. Incredibly he scored his four goals in his first three international matches during the 1966 FIFA World Cup, scoring twice against Chile on his debut. Porkuyan scored in the USSR's quarter final victory against Hungary, and scored his fourth goal of the tournament in a 2–1 loss to West Germany in the semi-final. He also was selected to play in the 1970 FIFA World Cup, but did not play any matches. He is the only active player of FC Chornomorets Odesa to have featured in a World Cup team.

== Coaching career ==
After retiring from playing he moved into coaching the following year in 1976, becoming assistant coach with SC Tavriya Simferopol. Along the way he had stints coaching amateur teams playing in the lower divisions. But since the 1980s he, almost continuously, has been connected with Chornomorets Odesa in a coaching capacity.

== Honours ==
=== Club ===
Dynamo Kyiv

- Soviet Top League Champion: 1966, 1967, 1968
- Soviet Cup Champion: 1966

=== Individual ===
- Merited Master of Sports: 1966
- FIFA World Cup Bronze Boot: 1966
