= László Takács (footballer, born 1955) =

Hungarian footballer (born 1955)

Personal information
- Full name: Tibor Onhausz
- Date of birth: April 18, 1955 (age 71)
- Place of birth: Mezőhegyes, Békés County, Hungary
- Positions: Left-back; midfielder

Youth career
- 1971–1973: Ferencvárosi TC

Senior career*
Years	Team	Apps	(Gls)
1973–1987	Ferencvárosi TC	53	(6)
1988–1989	ESMTK		

Managerial career
- 2009–2011: Szeged 2011
- * Club domestic league appearances and goals

László Takács (born April 18, 1955) is a Hungarian retired footballer. He played as a left-back and midfielder for Ferencvárosi TC and ESMTK throughout the 1970s and the 1980s.

== Career as a player ==
Emerging from the youth sector of Ferencvárosi TC, Takács was a part of the youth championship winning squad following an 11-year drought. This success saw him promoted to the senior squad where he played alongside other players such as Zoltán Ebedli, Tibor Nyilasi, Tamás Viczkó, Tibor Onhausz, Gusztáv Kelemen and Tibor Rab. With this roster, he played in the 1974–75 European Cup Winners' Cup where the club later appeared as runners-up. At that time, he was mostly in midfield before converting into a left-back. The following season, he was part of the winning squads for both the 1975–76 Nemzeti Bajnokság I and the 1975–76 Magyar Kupa. His most successful period with Ferencváros was between 1981 and 1983, where he was part of the winning squad for the 1980–81 Nemzeti Bajnokság I and runners-up for the following two seasons. He finished his career in Pesterzsébet with ESMTK before playing in amateur football within Burgenland state teams.

== Career as a manager ==
He served as a coach for Szeged-Csanád Grosics Akadémia from 2009 to 2011 with Takács also serving as manager within their inaugural season at the 2011–12 Nemzeti Bajnokság II.
