= Gusztáv Kelemen =

Hungarian footballer (1956–2017)

Personal information
- Full name: Gusztáv Kelemen
- Date of birth: September 2, 1956
- Place of birth: Budapest, Hungary
- Date of death: April 2, 2017 (aged 60)
- Position: Right winger

Youth career
- 1966–1973: Ferencvárosi TC

Senior career*
| Years | Team | Apps | (Gls) |
| 1973–1978 | Ferencvárosi TC | 74 | (8) |
| 1978–1979 | → H. Szabó Lajos (draft) | | |
| 1979–1987 | Csepel | 162 | (13) |
| 1987–1988 | ESMTK | | |

International career
| 1982 | Hungary | | |

Managerial career
- 1998: Budaörs
- 1999: Kiskunlacháza
- 2001: Lágymányosi TC
- 2008: Újbuda TC
- * Club domestic league appearances and goals

Gusztáv Kelemen (September 2, 1956 – April 2, 2017) was a Hungarian football player and manager. Nicknamed "Kicsi" or "Bivaly", he played as a right winger for Ferencvárosi TC and ESMTK throughout the 1970s and the 1980s. He also briefly represented his native country of Hungary for the 1984 Summer Olympics qualifiers.

== Club career ==
Rising in the youth ranks of Ferencvárosi TC. In 1974, they won the youth championship title after an 11-year period without titles. This resulted in Kelemen being promoted to the senior squad for the 1973–74 Ferencvárosi TC season alongside players such as Ferenc Ebedli, Tibor Nyilasi, Tamás Viczkó, László Takács, Tibor Onhausz and Tibor Rab. He saw his career highlight with the Fradi during the 1974–75 European Cup Winners' Cup where he was part of the runners-up squad. The club experienced further success as they won both the 1975–76 Nemzeti Bajnokság I and the 1975–76 Magyar Kupa within the same season. In 1978, he became a player of H. Szabó Lajos SE due to military conscription. He then moved to Csepel for their 1979–80 season where he would play throughout the 1980s. His highest success with the club came during the 1982–83 Nemzeti Bajnokság I where he was a part of the club's highest result in the top-flight of Hungarian football as he made 162 appearances with 13 goals. He spent his final season with ESMTK where he played alongside his old Fradi teammates such as Takács, Ebedli and László Pogány.

== International career ==
Kelemen made his debut for Hungary in a friendly against France on 6 October 1982 where he was a substitute for Mihály Borostyán. He spent far more time in the 1984 Summer Olympics qualifiers where, under manager György Mezey, he played in all six matches.

== Personal life ==
Following his retirement, he served as a coach for youth teams throughout the late 1990s and the 2000s.

Kelemen died on April 2, 2017, at the age of 60.
