= Tibor Onhausz =

Hungarian footballer (1955–2016)

Personal information
- Full name: Tibor Onhausz
- Date of birth: July 22, 1955
- Place of birth: Budapest, Hungary
- Date of death: August 25, 2016 (aged 61)
- Place of death: Siófok, Somogy County, Hungary
- Height: 1.78 m (5 ft 10 in)
- Positions: Defender; midfielder

Youth career
- 1969–1974: Ferencvárosi TC

Senior career*
Years	Team	Apps	(Gls)
1973–1977	Ferencvárosi TC	53	(6)
1977–1982	Rába ETO	103	(1)
1982–1986	Siófoki Bányász	1	(0)
1986–1989	Veszprém SE	9	(0)
- * Club domestic league appearances and goals

Tibor Onhausz (July 22, 1955 – August 25, 2016) was a Hungarian footballer. He played as both a defender and a midfielder for Ferencvárosi TC and Rába ETO throughout the 1970s and the early 1980s.

== Career ==
Being a home-grown player of Ferencváros, Onhausz spent his youth career with Ferencvárosi TC. In 1974, the Fradi won the youth championship title after 11 years. At that time, he was promoted to the senior team alongside Ferenc Ebedli, Tibor Nyilasi, Tamás Viczkó, László Takács, Gusztáv Kelemen and Tibor Rab. With this team, they made their debuts throughout the 1974–75 European Cup Winners' Cup, where they marched to the final where Onhausz himself played as a substitute for Nyilasi. The following season, they won both the 1975–76 Nemzeti Bajnokság I as well as the 1975–76 Magyar Kupa. He played a total of 53 matches for Fradi with 23 of those being within the Nemzeti Bajnokság I, 14 of them being international games and 16 within the Magyar Kupa, in which he scored 6 goals with 2 being within the Nemzeti Bajnokság I and the other four being from other tournaments.

In 1977, he moved to Rába ETO, then in 1982 to Siófoki Bányász, where he played in the top-flight of Hungarian until 1986, but he did not become a stable team member at either team. Within the two clubs, he played 104 league games in 9 seasons and scored one goal. He won the 1978–79 Magyar Kupa and the 1981–82 Nemzeti Bajnokság I with Rába ETO and won the 1983–84 Magyar Kupa with Siófok. Between 1986 and 1989 he played for Veszprém SE and finished his active football career there.

== Personal life ==
Onhausz lived in Siófok following his second marriage until his death on August 25, 2016 at the age of 61.
