= 1976–77 European Cup =

European football tournament

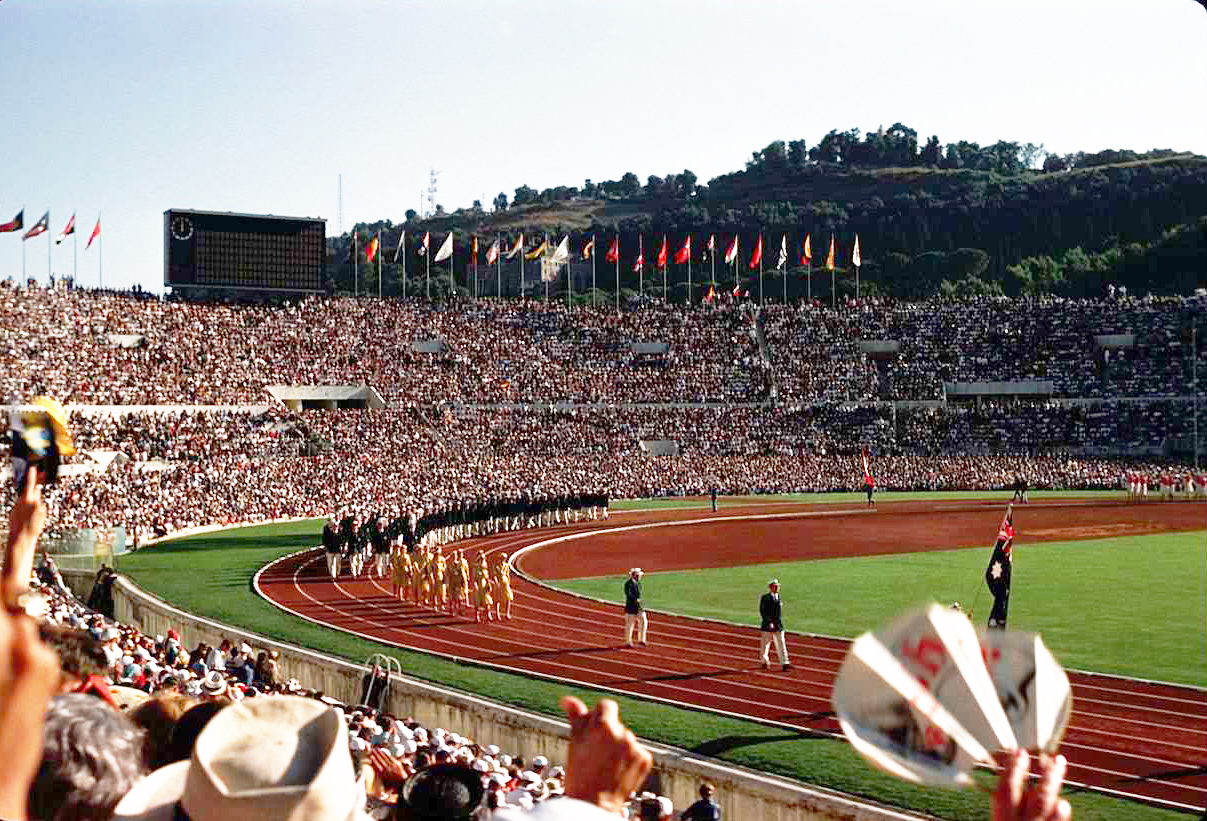
- Stadio Olimpico in Rome hosted the final.

Tournament details
- Dates: 15 September 1976 – 25 May 1977
- Teams: 32

Final positions
- Champions: (England) Liverpool (1st title)
- Runners-up: (West Germany) Borussia Mönchengladbach

Tournament statistics
- Matches played: 61
- Goals scored: 155 (2.54 per match)
- Attendance: 2,002,747 (32,832 per match)
- Top scorer(s): Franco Cucinotta (Zürich); Gerd Müller (Bayern Munich); 5 goals each

The 1976–77 season of the European Cup football club tournament was won for the first time by Liverpool in the final against Borussia Mönchengladbach. Three-time defending champions Bayern Munich were knocked out by Dynamo Kyiv in the quarter-finals. It was only the second time that an English side won the tournament, but it started a run of six consecutive wins by English clubs and an eight-year run during which the trophy was won by English clubs on seven occasions. Including this one, Liverpool reached five finals in nine years, of which they won four.

== Teams ==
Austria Vienna (1st)	(Belgium) Club Brugge (1st)	(Bulgaria) CSKA Sofia (1st)	(Cyprus) Omonia (1st)
(Czechoslovakia) Baník Ostrava (1st)	(Denmark) Køge (1st)	(England) Liverpool (1st)	(Finland) TPS (1st)
(France) Saint-Étienne (1st)	(East Germany) Dynamo Dresden (1st)	(West Germany) Borussia Mönchengladbach (1st)	(West Germany) Bayern Munich (3rd)^{TH}
(Greece) PAOK (1st)	(Hungary) Ferencváros (1st)	(Iceland) ÍA (1st)	(Republic of Ireland) Dundalk (1st)
(Italy) Torino (1st)	(Luxembourg) Jeunesse Esch (1st)	(Malta) Sliema Wanderers (1st)	(Netherlands) PSV Eindhoven (1st)
(Northern Ireland) Crusaders (1st)	(Norway) Viking (1st)	(Poland) Stal Mielec (1st)	(Portugal) Benfica (1st)
(Romania) Steaua București (1st)	(Scotland) Rangers (1st)	(Spain) Real Madrid (1st)	(Sweden) Malmö FF (1st)
(Switzerland) Zürich (1st)	(Turkey) Trabzonspor (1st)	(Soviet Union) Dynamo Kyiv (1st)	(Socialist Federal Republic of Yugoslavia) Partizan (1st)

== Bracket ==
1st Round
(Norway) Viking	2	0	2
(Czechoslovakia) Baník Ostrava	1	2	3
(Denmark) Køge	0	1	1
(West Germany) Bayern Munich	5	2	7
(Soviet Union) Dynamo Kyiv	3	2	5
(Socialist Federal Republic of Yugoslavia) Partizan	0	0	0
(Cyprus) Omonia	0	1	1
(Greece) PAOK	2	1	3
(Italy) Torino	2	1	3
(Sweden) Malmö FF	1	1	2
Austria Vienna	1	0	1
(West Germany) B. M'gladbach	0	3	3
(Poland) Stal Mielec	1	0	1
(Spain) Real Madrid	2	1	3
(Belgium) Club Brugge	2	1	3
(Romania) Steaua București	1	1	2
(Scotland) Rangers	1	0	1
(Switzerland) Zürich	1	1	2
(Malta) Sliema Wanderers	2	0	2
(Finland) TPS (a)	1	1	2
(Hungary) Ferencváros	5	6	11
(Luxembourg) Jeunesse Esch	1	2	3
(East Germany) Dynamo Dresden	2	0	2
(Portugal) Benfica	0	0	0
(Bulgaria) CSKA Sofia	0	0	0
(France) Saint-Étienne	0	1	1
(Republic of Ireland) Dundalk	1	0	1
(Netherlands) PSV	1	6	7
(Iceland) ÍA	1	2	3
(Turkey) Trabzonspor	3	3	6
(England) Liverpool	2	5	7
(Northern Ireland) Crusaders	0	0	0

2nd Round
(Czechoslovakia) Baník Ostrava	2	0	2
(West Germany) Bayern Munich	1	5	6
(Soviet Union) Dynamo Kyiv	4	2	6
(Greece) PAOK	0	0	0
(Italy) Torino	1	0	1
(West Germany) B. M'gladbach	2	0	2
(Spain) Real Madrid	0	0	0
(Belgium) Club Brugge	0	2	2
(Switzerland) Zürich	2	1	3
(Finland) TPS	0	0	0
(Hungary) Ferencváros	1	0	1
(East Germany) Dynamo Dresden	0	4	4
(France) Saint-Étienne	1	0	1
(Netherlands) PSV	0	0	0
(Turkey) Trabzonspor	1	0	1
(England) Liverpool	0	3	3

Quarterfinals
(West Germany) Bayern Munich	1	0	1
(Soviet Union) Dynamo Kyiv	0	2	2
(West Germany) B. M'gladbach	2	1	3
(Belgium) Club Brugge	2	0	2
(Switzerland) Zürich (a)	2	2	4
(East Germany) Dynamo Dresden	1	3	4
(France) Saint-Étienne	1	1	2
(England) Liverpool	0	3	3

Semifinals
(Soviet Union) Dynamo Kyiv	1	0	1
(West Germany) B. M'gladbach	0	2	2
(Switzerland) Zürich	1	0	1
(England) Liverpool	3	3	6

Finals
(West Germany) B. M'gladbach	1
(England) Liverpool	3

== First round ==
Team 1	Agg.	Team 2	1st leg	2nd leg
Rangers (Scotland)	1–2	(Switzerland) Zürich	1–1	0–1
Sliema Wanderers (Malta)	2–2 (a)	(Finland) TPS	2–1	0–1
Ferencváros (Hungary)	11–3	(Luxembourg) Jeunesse Esch	5–1	6–2
Dynamo Dresden (East Germany)	2–0	(Portugal) Benfica	2–0	0–0
CSKA Sofia (Bulgaria)	0–1	(France) Saint-Étienne	0–0	0–1
Dundalk (Republic of Ireland)	1–7	(Netherlands) PSV Eindhoven	1–1	0–6
ÍA (Iceland)	3–6	(Turkey) Trabzonspor	1–3	2–3
Liverpool (England)	7–0	(Northern Ireland) Crusaders	2–0	5–0
Viking (Norway)	2–3	(Czechoslovakia) Baník Ostrava	2–1	0–2
Køge (Denmark)	1–7	(West Germany) Bayern Munich	0–5	1–2
Dynamo Kyiv (Soviet Union)	5–0	(Socialist Federal Republic of Yugoslavia) Partizan	3–0	2–0
Omonia (Cyprus)	1–3	(Greece) PAOK	0–2	1–1
Torino (Italy)	3–2	(Sweden) Malmö FF	2–1	1–1
Austria Vienna	1–3	(West Germany) Borussia Mönchengladbach	1–0	0–3
Stal Mielec (Poland)	1–3	(Spain) Real Madrid	1–2	0–1
Club Brugge (Belgium)	3–2	(Romania) Steaua București	2–1	1–1

=== First leg ===
15 September 1976

Rangers (Scotland)	1–1	(Switzerland) Zürich
Parlane 34'	Report	Cucinotta 1'

Ibrox Stadium, Glasgow
Attendance: 28,500
Referee: Achille Verbecke (France)

14 September 1976

Sliema Wanderers (Malta)	2–1	(Finland) TPS
Aquilina 60', 76'	Report	Manninen 70'

Empire Stadium, Gżira
Attendance: 2,156
Referee: Domenico Serafino (Italy)

15 September 1976

Ferencváros (Hungary)	5–1	(Luxembourg) Jeunesse Esch
Nyilasi 14', 22'; Magyar 35'; Onhausz 48'; Ebedli 79'	Report	Giuliani 11'

Üllői úti stadion, Budapest
Attendance: 12,000
Referee: Hermes Reires (Cyprus)

15 September 1976

Dynamo Dresden (East Germany)	2–0	(Portugal) Benfica
Kotte 74'; Riedel 78'	Report

Dynamo-Stadion, Dresden
Attendance: 33,000
Referee: Franz Wöhrer (Austria)

15 September 1976

CSKA Sofia (Bulgaria)	0–0	(France) Saint-Étienne
	Report

Vasil Levski National Stadium, Sofia
Attendance: 70,000
Referee: Ernst Dörflinger-Buser (Switzerland)

15 September 1976

Dundalk (Republic of Ireland)	1–1	(Netherlands) PSV Eindhoven
McDowall 6'	Report	Van der Kuijlen 75'

Oriel Park, Dundalk
Attendance: 6,000
Referee: John Davies (Wales)

15 September 1976

ÍA (Iceland)	1–3	(Turkey) Trabzonspor
Sveinsson 56'	Report	Perekli 35'; Denizci 85', 87'

Laugardalsvöllur, Reykjavík
Attendance: 1,029
Referee: William Attley (Republic of Ireland)

14 September 1976

Liverpool (England)	2–0	(Northern Ireland) Crusaders
Neal 18' (pen.); Toshack 64'	Report

Anfield, Liverpool
Attendance: 22,442
Referee: Henning Lund-Sørensen (Denmark)

15 September 1976

Viking (Norway)	2–1	(Czechoslovakia) Baník Ostrava
Valen 13'; Johannessen 28'	Report	Slaný 81'

Stavanger Stadion, Stavanger
Attendance: 5,600
Referee: Georg Krutelew (Finland)

14 September 1976

Køge (Denmark)	0–5	(West Germany) Bayern Munich
	Report	Torstensson 3', 23'; Müller 19', 33'; Dürnberger 63'

Københavns Idrætspark, Copenhagen
Attendance: 24,800
Referee: Albert Victor (Luxembourg)

15 September 1976
19:00

Dynamo Kyiv (Soviet Union)	3–0	(Socialist Federal Republic of Yugoslavia) Partizan
Onyshchenko 7'; Troshkin 80'; Blokhin 88' (pen.)	Report

Central Stadium, Kyiv
Attendance: 41,000
Referee: Bob Matthewson (England)

15 September 1976

Omonia (Cyprus)	0–2	(Greece) PAOK
	Report	Koudas 38'; Sarafis 87'

GSP Stadium, Nicosia
Attendance: 9,400
Referee: Tsvetan Petrov Stanev (Bulgaria)

15 September 1976

Torino (Italy)	2–1	(Sweden) Malmö FF
Mozzini 44'; Graziani 90'	Report	K. Jönsson 87'

Stadio Olimpico Grande Torino, Turin
Attendance: 57,726
Referee: Doğan Babacan (Turkey)

15 September 1976

Austria Vienna	1–0	(West Germany) Borussia Mönchengladbach
Daxbacher 23'	Report

Ernst-Happel-Stadion, Vienna
Attendance: 54,000
Referee: Riccardo Lattanzi (Italy)

15 September 1976

Stal Mielec (Poland)	1–2	(Spain) Real Madrid
Sekulski 74'	Report	Santillana 6'; Del Bosque 52'

Stadion Miejski, Mielec
Attendance: 25,000
Referee: Ulf Eriksson (Sweden)

15 September 1976

Club Brugge (Belgium)	2–1	(Romania) Steaua București
Davies 55' (pen.); Verheecke 81'	Report	Troi 60'

Olympiastadion, Bruges
Attendance: 16,000
Referee: Walter Eschweiler (West Germany)

=== Second leg ===
29 September 1976

Zürich (Switzerland)	1–0	(Scotland) Rangers
Martinelli 8'	Report

Stadion Letzigrund, Zurich
Attendance: 28,500
Referee: Emilio Guruceta Muro (Spain)

Zürich won 2–1 on aggregate.

28 September 1976

TPS (Finland)	1–0	(Malta) Sliema Wanderers
Suhonen 85'	Report

Kupittaa, Turku
Attendance: 933
Referee: Egil Bergstad (Norway)

2–2 on aggregate; TPS won on away goals.

29 September 1976

Jeunesse Esch (Luxembourg)	2–6	(Hungary) Ferencváros
Zwally 45', 47'	Report	Nyilasi 2', 27'; Pusztai 43', 90'; Szabó 65', 67' (pen.)

Stade de la Frontière, Esch-sur-Alzette
Attendance: 3,500
Referee: Johannes Beck (Netherlands)

Ferencváros won 11–3 on aggregate.

29 September 1976

Benfica (Portugal)	0–0	(East Germany) Dynamo Dresden
	Report

Estádio da Luz, Lisbon
Attendance: 35,000
Referee: Robert Schaut (Belgium)

Dynamo Dresden won 2–0 on aggregate.

29 September 1976

Saint-Étienne (France)	1–0	(Bulgaria) CSKA Sofia
Piazza 31'	Report

Stade Geoffroy-Guichard, Saint-Étienne
Attendance: 38,743
Referee: António Garrido (Portugal)

Saint-Étienne won 1–0 on aggregate.

29 September 1976

PSV Eindhoven (Netherlands)	6–0	(Republic of Ireland) Dundalk
Van der Kuijlen 19'; Postuma 33'; Van de Kerkhof 38', 52', 59', 90'	Report

PSV Stadion, Eindhoven
Attendance: 12,000
Referee: Rudi Glöckner (East Germany)

PSV won 7–1 on aggregate.

29 September 1976

Trabzonspor (Turkey)	3–2	(Iceland) ÍA
Tok 8', 49'; Çınar 70'	Report	Thordarson 18', 55' (pen.)

Hüseyin Avni Aker Stadium, Trabzon
Attendance: 14,000
Referee: György Müncz (Hungary)

Trabzonspor won 6–3 on aggregate.

28 September 1976

Crusaders (Northern Ireland)	0–5	(England) Liverpool
	Report	Keegan 34'; Johnson 81', 90'; McDermott 84'; Heighway 87'

Seaview, Belfast
Attendance: 11,000
Referee: Gudmundur Haraldsson (Iceland)

Liverpool won 7–0 on aggregate.

29 September 1976

Baník Ostrava (Czechoslovakia)	2–0	(Norway) Viking
Vojáček 28', 54'	Report

Bazaly, Ostrava
Attendance: 5,606
Referee: Eldar Azimzade (Soviet Union)

Baník Ostrava won 3–2 on aggregate.

29 September 1976

Bayern Munich (West Germany)	2–1	(Denmark) Køge
Beckenbauer 7'; Torstensson 74'	Report	Poulsen 34'

Olympiastadion, Munich
Attendance: 25,000
Referee: Alojzy Jarguz (Poland)

Bayern Munich won 7–1 on aggregate.

29 September 1976
18:00

Partizan (Socialist Federal Republic of Yugoslavia)	0–2	(Soviet Union) Dynamo Kyiv
	Report	Muntyan 11' (pen.); Slobodyan 65'

Red Star Stadium, Belgrade (Note: Partizan played their home match at Red Star Stadium instead of their regular stadium JNA Stadium because it had greater capacity.)
Attendance: 50,654
Referee: Robert Wurtz (France)

Dynamo Kyiv won 5–0 on aggregate.

29 September 1976

PAOK (Greece)	1–1	(Cyprus) Omonia
Sarafis 72'	Report	Dimitriou 33' (pen.)

Toumba Stadium, Thessaloniki
Attendance: 11,045
Referee: Michal Jursa (Czechoslovakia)

PAOK won 3–1 on aggregate.

29 September 1976

Malmö FF (Sweden)	1–1	(Italy) Torino
Ljungberg 57' (pen.)	Report	P. Sala 3'

Malmö Stadion, Malmö
Attendance: 16,373
Referee: John Gordon (Scotland)

Torino won 3–2 on aggregate.

29 September 1976

Borussia Mönchengladbach (West Germany)	3–0	Austria Vienna
Stielike 39'; Bonhof 54' (pen.); Heynckes 57'	Report

Bökelbergstadion, Mönchengladbach
Attendance: 28,000
Referee: Károly Palotai (Hungary)

Borussia Mönchengladbach won 3–1 on aggregate.

29 September 1976

Real Madrid (Spain)	1–0	(Poland) Stal Mielec
Pirri 64'	Report

Mestalla, Valencia
Attendance: 35,000
Referee: Michel Kitabdjian (France)

Real Madrid won 3–1 on aggregate.

29 September 1976

Steaua București (Romania)	1–1	(Belgium) Club Brugge
Vigu 25'	Report	Lambert 71'

Steaua Stadium, Bucharest
Attendance: 15,000
Referee: Orhan Cebe (Turkey)

Club Brugge won 3–2 on aggregate.

== Second round ==
Team 1	Agg.	Team 2	1st leg	2nd leg
Zürich (Switzerland)	3–0	(Finland) TPS	2–0	1–0
Ferencváros (Hungary)	1–4	(East Germany) Dynamo Dresden	1–0	0–4
Saint-Étienne (France)	1–0	(Netherlands) PSV Eindhoven	1–0	0–0
Trabzonspor (Turkey)	1–3	(England) Liverpool	1–0	0–3
Baník Ostrava (Czechoslovakia)	2–6	(West Germany) Bayern Munich	2–1	0–5
Dynamo Kyiv (Soviet Union)	6–0	(Greece) PAOK	4–0	2–0
Torino (Italy)	1–2	(West Germany) Borussia Mönchengladbach	1–2	0–0
Real Madrid (Spain)	0–2	(Belgium) Club Brugge	0–0	0–2

=== First leg ===
20 October 1976

Zürich (Switzerland)	2–0	(Finland) TPS
Cucinotta 17'; Scheiwiler 71'	Report

Letzigrund, Zurich
Attendance: 15,500
Referee: Josef Pouček (Czechoslovakia)

20 October 1976

Ferencváros (Hungary)	1–0	(East Germany) Dynamo Dresden
Onhausz 34'	Report

Stadion Albert Flórián, Budapest
Attendance: 30,000
Referee: Nikola Milanov Doudine (Bulgaria)

20 October 1976

Saint-Étienne (France)	1–0	(Netherlands) PSV Eindhoven
Piazza 61'	Report

Stade Geoffroy-Guichard, Saint-Étienne
Attendance: 36,079
Referee: Walter Eschweiler (West Germany)

20 October 1976

Trabzonspor (Turkey)	1–0	(England) Liverpool
Usta 62' (pen.)	Report

Hüseyin Avni Aker Stadium, Trabzon
Attendance: 13,000
Referee: Nicolae Rainea (Romania)

20 October 1976

Baník Ostrava (Czechoslovakia)	2–1	(West Germany) Bayern Munich
Lorenc 11'; Lička 27'	Report	Müller 53'

Bazaly, Ostrava
Attendance: 31,000
Referee: Robert Héliès (France)

20 October 1976
19:00

Dynamo Kyiv (Soviet Union)	4–0	(Greece) PAOK
Buryak 12', 22'; Kolotov 27'; Slobodyan 60'	Report

Central Stadium, Kyiv
Attendance: 35,000
Referee: Charles Corver (Netherlands)

20 October 1976

Torino (Italy)	1–2	(West Germany) Borussia Mönchengladbach
P. Sala 64'	Report	Vogts 28'; Klinkhammer 79'

Stadio Olimpico Grande Torino, Turin
Attendance: 71,160
Referee: Walter Hungerbühler (Switzerland)

20 October 1976

Real Madrid (Spain)	0–0	(Belgium) Club Brugge
	Report

La Rosaleda Stadium, Málaga
Attendance: 45,000
Referee: John Carpenter (Republic of Ireland)

=== Second leg ===
3 November 1976

TPS (Finland)	0–1	(Switzerland) Zürich
	Report	Cucinotta 70'

Kupittaa, Turku
Attendance: 823
Referee: Marian Kustoń (Poland)

Zürich won 3–0 on aggregate.

3 November 1976

Dynamo Dresden (East Germany)	4–0	(Hungary) Ferencváros
Heidler 42'; Schmuck 52'; Riedel 59'; Kotte 73'	Report

Rudolf-Harbig-Stadion, Dresden
Attendance: 30,000
Referee: Hilmi Ok (Turkey)

Dynamo Dresden won 4–1 on aggregate.

3 November 1976

PSV Eindhoven (Netherlands)	0–0	(France) Saint-Étienne
	Report

Philips Stadion, Eindhoven
Attendance: 21,000
Referee: Franz Wöhrer (Austria)

Saint-Étienne won 1–0 on aggregate.

3 November 1976

Liverpool (England)	3–0	(Turkey) Trabzonspor
Heighway 8'; Johnson 10'; Keegan 19'	Report

Anfield, Liverpool
Attendance: 42,275
Referee: Erik Fredriksson (Sweden)

Liverpool won 3–1 on aggregate.

3 November 1976

Bayern Munich (West Germany)	5–0	(Czechoslovakia) Baník Ostrava
Müller 15', 49'; Rummenigge 37'; Kapellmann 71'; Torstensson 74'	Report

Olympiastadion, Munich
Attendance: 58,500
Referee: Dušan Maksimović (Yugoslavia)

Bayern Munich won 6–2 on aggregate.

3 November 1976
19:30

PAOK (Greece)	0–2	(Soviet Union) Dynamo Kyiv
	Report	Kolotov 73'; Blokhin 82'

Toumba Stadium, Thessaloniki
Attendance: 19,733
Referee: Cesare Gussoni (Italy)

Dynamo Kyiv won 6–0 on aggregate.

3 November 1976

Borussia Mönchengladbach (West Germany)	0–0	(Italy) Torino
	Report

Rheinstadion, Düsseldorf
Attendance: 64,389
Referee: Alfred Delcourt (Belgium)

Borussia Mönchengladbach won 2–1 on aggregate.

3 November 1976

Club Brugge (Belgium)	2–0	(Spain) Real Madrid
Le Fevre 18'; Rubiñán 45' (o.g.)	Report

Olympiastadion, Bruges
Attendance: 32,000
Referee: Ken Burns (England)

Club Brugge won 2–0 on aggregate.

== Quarter-finals ==
Team 1	Agg.	Team 2	1st leg	2nd leg
Zürich (Switzerland)	4–4 (a)	(East Germany) Dynamo Dresden	2–1	2–3
Saint-Étienne (France)	2–3	(England) Liverpool	1–0	1–3
Bayern Munich (West Germany)	1–2	(Soviet Union) Dynamo Kyiv	1–0	0–2
Borussia Mönchengladbach (West Germany)	3–2	(Belgium) Club Brugge	2–2	1–0

=== First leg ===
2 March 1977

Zürich (Switzerland)	2–1	(East Germany) Dynamo Dresden
Cucinotta 41'; Risi 90'	Report	Kreische 77'

Letzigrund, Zurich
Attendance: 19,000
Referee: Nicolae Rainea (Romania)

2 March 1977

Saint-Étienne (France)	1–0	(England) Liverpool
Bathenay 78'	Report

Stade Geoffroy-Guichard, Saint-Étienne
Attendance: 37,549
Referee: Károly Palotai (Hungary)

2 March 1977
20:00

Bayern Munich (West Germany)	1–0	(Soviet Union) Dynamo Kyiv
Künkel 43'	Report

Olympiastadion, Munich
Attendance: 70,000
Referee: António Garrido (Portugal)

2 March 1977

Borussia Mönchengladbach (West Germany)	2–2	(Belgium) Club Brugge
Kulik 43'; Simonsen 63'	Report	Cools 23'; Courant 39'

Rheinstadion, Düsseldorf
Attendance: 65,000
Referee: Georges Konrath (France)

=== Second leg ===
16 March 1977

Dynamo Dresden (East Germany)	3–2	(Switzerland) Zürich
Schade 18' (pen.); Kreische 54', 63'	Report	Cucinotta 37'; Risi 64'

Rudolf-Harbig-Stadion, Dresden
Attendance: 33,000
Referee: Ángel Franco Martínez (Spain)

4–4 on aggregate; Zürich won on away goals.

16 March 1977

Liverpool (England)	3–1	(France) Saint-Étienne
Keegan 2'; Kennedy 59'; Fairclough 84'	Report	Bathenay 50'

Anfield, Liverpool
Attendance: 55,043
Referee: Charles Corver (Netherlands)

Liverpool won 3–2 on aggregate.

16 March 1977
19:00

Dynamo Kyiv (Soviet Union)	2–0	(West Germany) Bayern Munich
Buryak 83' (pen.); Slobodyan 88'	Report

Central Stadium, Kyiv
Attendance: 100,000
Referee: Erich Linemayr (Austria)

Dynamo Kyiv won 2–1 on aggregate.

16 March 1977

Club Brugge (Belgium)	0–1	(West Germany) Borussia Mönchengladbach
	Report	Hannes 84'

Olympiastadion, Bruges
Attendance: 32,000
Referee: Pavel Kazakov (Soviet Union)

Borussia Mönchengladbach won 3–2 on aggregate.

== Semi-finals ==
Team 1	Agg.	Team 2	1st leg	2nd leg
Zürich (Switzerland)	1–6	(England) Liverpool	1–3	0–3
Dynamo Kyiv (Soviet Union)	1–2	(West Germany) Borussia Mönchengladbach	1–0	0–2

=== First leg ===
6 April 1977

Zürich (Switzerland)	1–3	(England) Liverpool
Risi 6' (pen.)	Report	Neal 14', 67' (pen.); Heighway 48'

Letzigrund, Zurich
Attendance: 30,000
Referee: Dogan Babacan (Turkey)

6 April 1977
19:00

Dynamo Kyiv (Soviet Union)	1–0	(West Germany) Borussia Mönchengladbach
Onyshchenko 71'	Report

Central Stadium, Kyiv
Attendance: 102,000
Referee: Pablo Sánchez Ibáñez (Spain)

=== Second leg ===
20 April 1977

Liverpool (England)	3–0	(Switzerland) Zürich
Case 33', 79'; Keegan 83'	Report

Anfield, Liverpool
Attendance: 50,611
Referee: Sergio Gonella (Italy)

Liverpool won 6–1 on aggregate.

20 April 1977
20:00

Borussia Mönchengladbach (West Germany)	2–0	(Soviet Union) Dynamo Kyiv
Bonhof 31' (pen.); Wittkamp 82'	Report

Rheinstadion, Düsseldorf
Attendance: 72,000
Referee: Francis Rion (Belgium)

Borussia Mönchengladbach won 2–1 on aggregate.

== Final ==
25 May 1977

Borussia Mönchengladbach (West Germany)	1–3	(England) Liverpool
Simonsen 52'	Report	McDermott 28'; Smith 64'; Neal 82' (pen.)

Stadio Olimpico, Rome
Attendance: 52,078
Referee: Robert Wurtz (France)

== Top scorers ==
Rank	Player	Team	Goals
1	(Italy) Franco Cucinotta	(Switzerland) Zürich	5
1	(West Germany) Gerd Müller	(West Germany) Bayern Munich	5
3	(England) Kevin Keegan	(England) Liverpool	4
3	(Netherlands) René van de Kerkhof	(Netherlands) PSV Eindhoven	4
3	(England) Phil Neal	(England) Liverpool	4
3	(Hungary) Tibor Nyilasi	(Hungary) Ferencváros	4
3	(Sweden) Conny Torstensson	(West Germany) Bayern Munich	4
8	(Soviet Union) Leonid Buryak	(Soviet Union) Dynamo Kyiv	3
8	(Republic of Ireland) Steve Heighway	(England) Liverpool	3
8	(England) David Johnson	(England) Liverpool	3
8	(East Germany) Hans-Jürgen Kreische	(East Germany) Dynamo Dresden	3
8	(Switzerland) Peter Risi	(Switzerland) Zürich	3
8	(Soviet Union) Petro Slobodyan	(Soviet Union) Dynamo Kyiv	3
