= 1975 in Soviet football =

Football in the Soviet Union
- Season: 1975

Men's football
- Top League: Dinamo Kiev
- First League: Krylia Sovetov Kuibyshev
- Second League: Terek Groznyi
- Soviet Cup: Ararat Yerevan

The 1975 Soviet football championship was the 43rd seasons of competitive football in the Soviet Union and the 37th among teams of sports societies and factories. Dinamo Kiev won the championship becoming the Soviet domestic champions for the seventh time.

== Honours ==
| Competition | Winner | Runner-up |
|---|---|---|
| Top League | Dinamo Kiev (7) | Shakhter Donetsk |
| First League | Krylia Sovetov Kuibyshev (4) | Dinamo Minsk |
| Second League | Terek Groznyi | Daugava Riga |
| Soviet Cup | Ararat Yerevan (2) | Zaria Voroshilovgrad |

Notes = Number in parentheses is the times that club has won that honour. * indicates new record for competition

== Soviet Union football championship ==
=== Top League ===
| Pos | Team | Pld | W | D | L | GF | GA | GD | Pts | Qualification or relegation |
|---|---|---|---|---|---|---|---|---|---|---|
| 1 | (Ukrainian Soviet Socialist Republic) Dynamo Kyiv (C) | 30 | 17 | 9 | 4 | 53 | 30 | +23 | 43 | Qualification for European Cup first round |
| 2 | (Ukrainian Soviet Socialist Republic) Shakhtar Donetsk | 30 | 15 | 8 | 7 | 45 | 23 | +22 | 38 | Qualification for UEFA Cup first round |
| 3 | (Russian Soviet Federative Socialist Republic) Dynamo Moscow | 30 | 13 | 12 | 5 | 39 | 23 | +16 | 38 | Qualification for UEFA Cup first round |
| 4 | (Russian Soviet Federative Socialist Republic) Torpedo Moscow | 30 | 13 | 8 | 9 | 42 | 33 | +9 | 34 | |
| 5 | (Armenian Soviet Socialist Republic) Ararat Yerevan | 30 | 15 | 4 | 11 | 40 | 38 | +2 | 34 | |
| 6 | (Ukrainian Soviet Socialist Republic) Karpaty Lviv | 30 | 11 | 10 | 9 | 36 | 28 | +8 | 32 | |
| 7 | (Ukrainian Soviet Socialist Republic) Dnipro Dnipropetrovsk | 30 | 10 | 11 | 9 | 33 | 30 | +3 | 31 | |
| 8 | (Georgian Soviet Socialist Republic) Dinamo Tbilisi | 30 | 11 | 9 | 10 | 32 | 32 | 0 | 31 | Qualification for Cup Winners' Cup first round |
| 9 | (Ukrainian Soviet Socialist Republic) Zarya Voroshilovgrad | 30 | 10 | 11 | 9 | 32 | 37 | −5 | 31 | |
| 10 | (Russian Soviet Federative Socialist Republic) Spartak Moscow | 30 | 9 | 10 | 11 | 27 | 30 | −3 | 28 | |
| 11 | (Russian Soviet Federative Socialist Republic) Lokomotiv Moscow | 30 | 7 | 12 | 11 | 28 | 33 | −5 | 26 | |
| 12 | (Ukrainian Soviet Socialist Republic) Chornomorets Odessa | 30 | 8 | 10 | 12 | 27 | 35 | −8 | 26 | |
| 13 | (Russian Soviet Federative Socialist Republic) CSKA Moscow | 30 | 6 | 13 | 11 | 29 | 36 | −7 | 25 | |
| 14 | (Russian Soviet Federative Socialist Republic) Zenit Leningrad | 30 | 7 | 10 | 13 | 27 | 42 | −15 | 24 | |
| 15 | (Uzbek Soviet Socialist Republic) Pakhtakor Tashkent (R) | 30 | 8 | 7 | 15 | 31 | 44 | −13 | 23 | Relegation to First League |
| 16 | (Russian Soviet Federative Socialist Republic) SKA Rostov-on-Don (R) | 30 | 4 | 8 | 18 | 23 | 50 | −27 | 16 | Relegation to First League |

Source: rsssf.com
(C) Champions; (R) Relegated

=== First League ===
| Pos | Rep | Team | Pld | W | D | L | GF | GA | GD | Pts | Promotion or relegation |
|---|---|---|---|---|---|---|---|---|---|---|---|
| 1 | RUS | Krylya Sovetov Kuibyshev | 38 | 22 | 9 | 7 | 78 | 36 | +42 | 53 | Promoted |
| 2 | BLR | Dinamo Minsk | 38 | 21 | 8 | 9 | 52 | 31 | +21 | 50 | Promoted |
| 3 | GEO | Torpedo Kutaisi | 38 | 18 | 13 | 7 | 55 | 31 | +24 | 49 | |
| 4 | KAZ | Kayrat Alma-Ata | 38 | 20 | 7 | 11 | 58 | 34 | +24 | 47 | |
| 5 | AZE | Neftchi Baku | 38 | 17 | 12 | 9 | 58 | 35 | +23 | 46 | |
| 6 | MDA | Nistru Kishinev | 38 | 17 | 9 | 12 | 44 | 43 | +1 | 43 | |
| 7 | UKR | Tavria Simferopol | 38 | 17 | 8 | 13 | 58 | 46 | +12 | 42 | |
| 8 | RUS | Shinnik Yaroslavl | 38 | 12 | 15 | 11 | 48 | 42 | +6 | 39 | |
| 9 | RUS | Spartak Orjonikidze | 38 | 15 | 7 | 16 | 41 | 43 | −2 | 37 | |
| 10 | TJK | Pamir Dushanbe | 38 | 12 | 13 | 13 | 45 | 51 | −6 | 37 | |
| 11 | RUS | Rubin Kazan | 38 | 12 | 13 | 13 | 37 | 51 | −14 | 37 | |
| 12 | UKR | Spartak Ivano-Frankovsk | 38 | 14 | 7 | 17 | 50 | 48 | +2 | 35 | |
| 13 | UKR | Metallurg Zaporozhye | 38 | 11 | 13 | 14 | 47 | 45 | +2 | 35 | |
| 14 | RUS | Spartak Nalchik | 38 | 11 | 13 | 14 | 33 | 42 | −9 | 35 | |
| 15 | RUS | Kuzbass Kemerovo | 38 | 13 | 8 | 17 | 36 | 47 | −11 | 34 | |
| 16 | RUS | Kuban Krasnodar | 38 | 12 | 9 | 17 | 38 | 47 | −9 | 33 | |
| 17 | RUS | Zvezda Perm | 38 | 12 | 8 | 18 | 35 | 50 | −15 | 32 | Relegation Play-Off |
| 18 | RUS | UralMash Sverdlovsk | 38 | 13 | 6 | 19 | 44 | 56 | −12 | 32 | Relegation Play-Off |
| 19 | UKR | Metallist Kharkov | 38 | 10 | 11 | 17 | 30 | 49 | −19 | 31 | Relegated |
| 20 | KGZ | Alga Frunze | 38 | 4 | 5 | 29 | 28 | 88 | −60 | 13 | Relegated |

Source: rsssf.com
Notes:

Relegation Play-Off

[Tashkent]

- Zvezda Perm 2-1 UralMash Sverdlovsk

=== Second League (finals) ===
[Chimkent]

| Pos | Rep | Team | Pld | W | D | L | GF | GA | GD | Pts | Promotion |
|---|---|---|---|---|---|---|---|---|---|---|---|
| 1 | RUS | Terek Grozny | 5 | 3 | 2 | 0 | 11 | 4 | +7 | 8 | Promoted |
| 2 | LVA | Daugava Riga | 5 | 3 | 2 | 0 | 7 | 4 | +3 | 8 | Promoted |
| 3 | TKM | Stroitel Ashkhabad | 5 | 2 | 3 | 0 | 8 | 3 | +5 | 7 | Promoted |
| 4 | UZB | Yangiyer | 5 | 1 | 2 | 2 | 4 | 5 | −1 | 4 | |
| 5 | GEO | Guria Lanchkhuti | 5 | 0 | 2 | 3 | 6 | 14 | −8 | 2 | |
| 6 | RUS | Dinamo Makhachkala | 5 | 0 | 1 | 4 | 4 | 10 | −6 | 1 | |

Source: rsssf.com

=== Top goalscorers ===
Top League

- Oleg Blokhin (Dinamo Kiev) – 18 goals

First League

- Anatoliy Ionkin (Kairat Alma-Ata) – 27 goals
