= 1975 European Cup Winners' Cup final =

- Match programme cover
- Event: 1974–75 European Cup Winners' Cup
Dynamo Kyiv	Ferencváros
(Soviet Union)	(Hungary)
3	0
- Date: 14 May 1975
- Venue: St. Jakob Stadium, Basel
- Referee: Bobby Davidson (Scotland)
- Attendance: 10,897

The 1975 European Cup Winners' Cup final was a football match held at St. Jakob Stadium in Basel, Switzerland on 14 May 1975. It was the final match of the 1974–75 European Cup Winners' Cup – the 15th European Cup Winners' Cup final – and was contested by Dynamo Kyiv of the Soviet Union and Ferencváros of Hungary.

A brace from Vladimir Onishchenko and a goal from Oleg Blokhin saw Dynamo Kyiv win the match 3–0 to lift the trophy.

== Background ==
Neither Dynamo Kyiv nor Ferencváros had contested a European Cup Winners' Cup final before. It was the second time a team from the Soviet Union had reached the final after Dynamo Moscow lost 3–2 to Rangers of Scotland in 1972. It was also the second time that a Hungarian team had reached the final after MTK Budapest lost to Sporting CP of Portugal in 1964.

Dynamo Kyiv lost to Celtic of Scotland in the quarter-finals on their only previous appearance in the European Cup Winners' Cup in 1965–66.

Ferencváros had played in the competition twice before, losing to Rangers of Scotland in the preliminary round in 1960–61 and Sparta Prague of Czechoslovakia in 1972–73.

== Route to the final ==
Dynamo Kyiv qualified for the European Cup Winners' Cup by winning the 1974 Soviet Cup. In the first round, they defeated CSKA Sofia of Bulgaria 1–0 at home and away to advance 2–0 on aggregate. They then faced Eintracht Frankfurt of West Germany in the second round, winning 3–2 in Frankfurt and 2–1 in Kyiv to advance 5–3 on aggregate. In the quarter-finals, they faced Bursaspor of Turkey and again won both legs 1–0 away and 2–0 at home to advance 3–0 on aggregate. After beating PSV Eindhoven of the Netherlands 3–0 in the first leg at home, Dynamo Kyiv advanced to the final despite a 2–1 loss on the night (4–2 on aggregate).

Ferencváros qualified for the European Cup Winners' Cup by winning the 1973–74 Magyar Kupa. In the first round, they defeated Cardiff City of Wales 2–0 at home and 4–1 to advance 6–1 on aggregate. They faced Liverpool of England in the second round. After a 1–1 draw in Liverpool and a goalless draw in Budapest (1–1 on aggregate), Ferencváros advanced on away goals. After defeating Malmö FF of Sweden 3–1 in the first leg of the quarter-final, they drew 1–1 in the second leg in Budapest to advance to semi-finals 4–2 on aggregate. In the semi-finals, they defeated Red Star Belgrade of Yugoslavia 2–1 at home in the first leg before drawing the second leg 2–2 to reach the final 4–3 on aggregate.

(Soviet Union) Dynamo Kyiv					(Hungary) Ferencváros			
Opponent	Agg.	1st leg	2nd leg		Opponent	Agg.	1st leg	2nd leg
(Bulgaria) CSKA Sofia	2–0	1–0 (H)	1–0 (A)	First round	(Wales) Cardiff City	6–1	2–0 (H)	4–1 (A)
(West Germany) Eintracht Frankfurt	5–3	3–2 (A)	2–1 (H)	Second round	(England) Liverpool	1–1 (a)	1–1 (A)	0–0 (H)
(Turkey) Bursaspor	3–0	1–0 (A)	2–0 (H)	Quarter-finals	(Sweden) Malmö FF	4–2	3–1 (A)	1–1 (H)
(Netherlands) PSV	4–2	3–0 (H)	1–2 (A)	Semi-finals	(Socialist Federal Republic of Yugoslavia) Red Star Belgrade	4–3	2–1 (H)	2–2 (A)

== Match details ==
14 May 1975

Dynamo Kyiv (Soviet Union)	3–0	(Hungary) Ferencváros
Onyshchenko 18', 39'; Blokhin 67'	Report

St. Jakob Stadium, Basel
Attendance: 10,897
Referee: Bobby Davidson (Scotland)

Dynamo Kyiv	Ferencváros

GK	1	(Soviet Union) Yevhen Rudakov
MF	2	(Soviet Union) Anatoliy Konkov
DF	3	(Soviet Union) Viktor Matviyenko
DF	4	(Soviet Union) Mykhaylo Fomenko
DF	5	(Soviet Union) Stefan Reshko
DF	6	(Soviet Union) Volodymyr Troshkin
MF	7	(Soviet Union) Vladimir Muntyan
FW	8	(Soviet Union) Volodymyr Onyshchenko
MF	9	(Soviet Union) Viktor Kolotov (c)
MF	10	(Soviet Union) Leonid Buryak
FW	11	(Soviet Union) Oleg Blokhin
Manager:
(Soviet Union) Valeriy Lobanovskyi

GK	1	(Hungary) István Géczi (c)
DF	2	(Hungary) Győző Martos
DF	3	(Hungary) Miklós Pataki
DF	4	(Hungary) István Megyesi
DF	6	(Hungary) Tibor Rab
MF	5	(Hungary) István Juhász
MF	8	(Hungary) Tibor Nyilasi	(substituted off) 60'
MF	10	(Hungary) József Mucha
MF	7	(Hungary) Ferenc Szabó
FW	9	(Hungary) János Máté
FW	11	(Hungary) István Magyar
Substitutes:
FW	13	(Hungary) Tibor Onhausz	(substituted on) 60'
Manager:
(Hungary) Jenő Dalnoki

== See also ==
- 1975 European Cup Final
- 1975 UEFA Cup Final
- FC Dynamo Kyiv in European football
- Ferencvárosi TC in European football
