= Ebedli =

Ebedli is a surname. Notable people with the surname include:

- Ferenc Ebedli (1952–2024), Hungarian football manager and player, brother of Zoltán
- Zoltán Ebedli (born 1953), Hungarian footballer
