= Ferenc Szabó (footballer, born 1956) =

Hungarian footballer (born 1956)

Personal information
- Full name: Ferenc Szabó
- Date of birth: January 4, 1956 (age 70)
- Place of birth: Celldömölk, Vas, Hungary
- Position: Forward

Youth career
- ???–1972: Celldömölki VSE
- 1972–1974: Szombathelyi Haladás

Senior career*
Years	Team	Apps	(Gls)
1973–1974	Szombathelyi Haladás	5	(2)
1974–1977	Ferencvárosi TC	70	(29)
1977–1980	Rába ETO	34	(7)
1980–1981	Ferencvárosi TC	7	(0)
1981–1984	Szombathelyi Haladás	67	(22)
1984–1986	Sabaria SE		
1986–1988	Celldömölki VSE		

International career
1972–1976	Hungary U21	9	(2)
- * Club domestic league appearances and goals

Ferenc Szabó (born January 4, 1956) is a retired Hungarian footballer. He primarily played for Szombathelyi Haladás, Rába ETO and Ferencvárosi TC throughout the 1970s and the 1980s as a forward.

== Club career ==
He started playing football in his hometown and from there he moved to Szombathelyi Haladás in Szombathely, taking insipiration from his father who also played for the club. From 1974, he became a player of the Ferencvárosi TC as a part of an experiment to include younger players within the team as Tibor Nyilasi, Zoltán Ebedli, István Magyar and Tibor Rab and was part of the success of the 1974–75 European Cup Winners' Cup when the team reached the final and despite being a new signing, he played in the 1975 European Cup Winners' Cup final where the club lost 3–0 against Dynamo Kyiv. His most memorable match was also in the autumn of 1974 on 25 September at Üllői út against Rába ETO, when they achieved a 6-1 beating with 5 goals where Szabó achieved a hat-trick. He also scored another hat-trick in a friendly against Argentinian club Estudiantes de la Plata in 1975. In the following seasons, he was no longer able to perform as well and was gradually pushed out of the Starting XI due to Szabó being extremely prone to injury as he had four cartilage surgeries throughout his career but was still a part of the winning squad for the 1975–76 Nemzeti Bajnokság I. In 1977, he was traded to Rába ETO for László Szokolai, but he did not become a regular in the team either and in the 1980–81 season, he returned to Ferencváros for a short time, where he was also a substitute and was part of the winning team for the 1980–81 Nemzeti Bajnokság I, scoring two goals during the 5–1 victory against Győri ETO where he scored the first and last goals of the match. He played a total of 159 matches for the Fradi with 77 league appearances, 44 international games 38 domestic matches and scored 79 goals with 29 being within the league and the remaining 50 being from other matches. From the next season, he played again in Szombathely: three seasons in Haladás, two in Sabaria SE. He finished his active football in Celldömölki VSE in the 1987–88 season alongside his former Fradi teammate László Rátkai.

== International career ==
Szabó made nine appearances and scored two goals for the Hungary U21 team. He played in the 1976 UEFA European Under-23 Championship where he scored his second goal in the qualifiers against Austria U21.
