= FC Dynamo Kyiv in European football =

Ukrainian club in European football

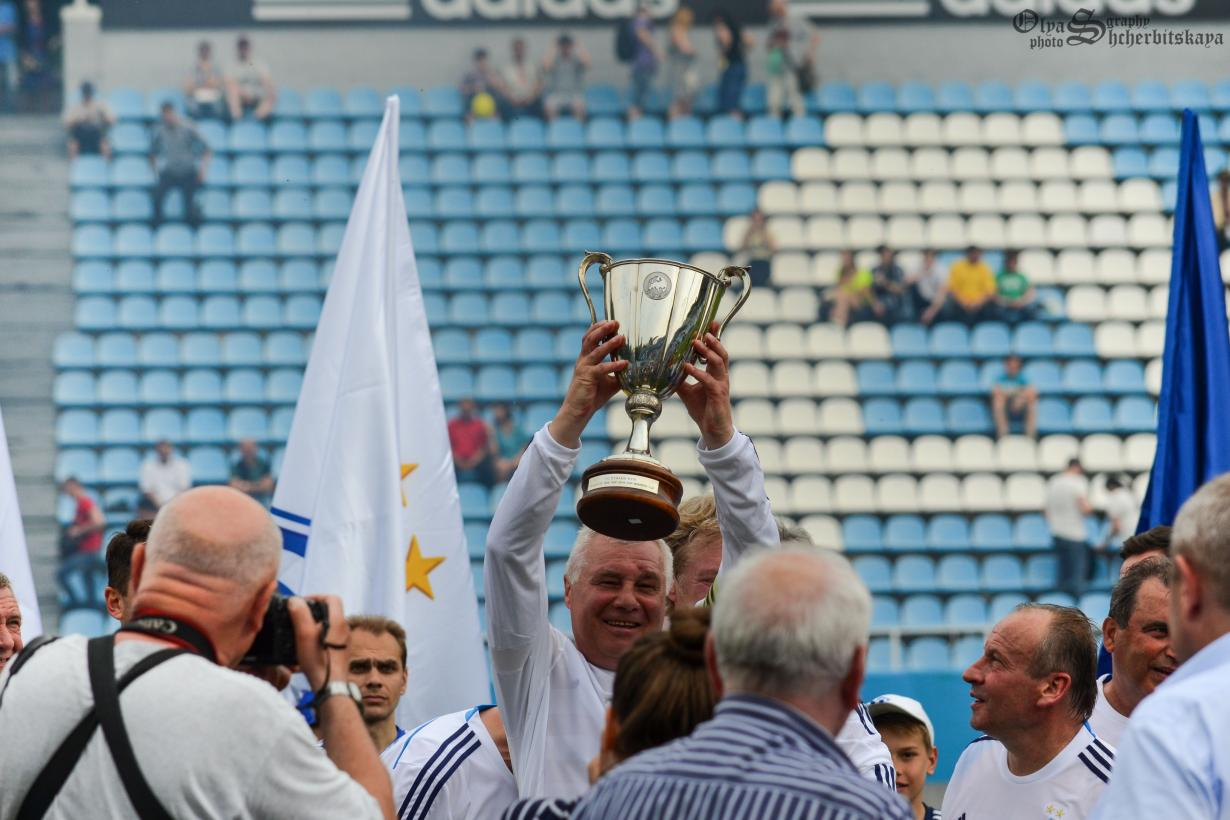
- The 1986 Dynamo's trophy in 2016
- Club: FC Dynamo Kyiv
- Seasons played: 56
- First entry: 1965–66 European Cup Winners' Cup
- Latest entry: 2026–27 UEFA Europa League

Titles
- Cup Winners' Cup: 1975, 1986 (2)
- Super Cup: 1975 (1)

FC Dynamo Kyiv in European football participates with small breaks since 1965. Based in Pechersk, Kyiv, it represented the Soviet Union until 1992. Following the dissolution of the Soviet Union at the end of 1991, Dynamo represents its native Ukraine.

Representing the Soviet Union, Dynamo made a European debut in the 1965–66 European Cup Winners' Cup as a "test bunny". It was the only Soviet club that participated in that UEFA season. Since 1965, Dynamo has missed only five seasons and holds the record for the most seasons in European competitions among Soviet and Ukrainian clubs. With two UEFA Cup Winners' Cup trophies, it is also the most successful Soviet club in European competitions.

Dynamo's home stadium is the Dynamo imeni Valeriya Lobanovskoho located in Pechersk, Kyiv. However, for matches that require high-volume crowd capacity, in particular the UEFA club competitions, Dynamo leases the Olimpiyskiy National Sports Complex, which is also located in the Pecherskyi District, but at a distance. On several occasions, Dynamo used other stadiums as its home field in the European competitions.

== Overall record ==
=== Statistics in UEFA competitions ===
Tournament	Part.	Pld	W	D	L	GF	GA	GD	Points	Win %	Best result
UEFA Champions League	41	264	109	57	98	369	324	+45	275	41.3	Semi-finals
Cup Winners' Cup	4	30	20	6	4	71	27	+44	46	66.7	Winners (2)
UEFA Europa League	23	133	48	42	43	176	159	+17	138	35.9	Semi-finals
UEFA Conference League	2	5	1	0	4	4	8	−4	2	20	League phase
UEFA Super Cup	2	3	2	0	1	3	1	+2	4	66.7	Winners (1)
Total	72	435	180	105	150	623	519	+104	465	41.4	3 titles

Matches at neutral places during the Russo-Ukrainian war	Pld	W	D	L	GF	GA	GD
Lublin, Poland	12	6	1	5	22	11	+11
Łódź, Poland	6	1	1	4	1	7	-6
Hamburg, Germany	4	1	-	3	2	9	-7
Bucharest, Romania	2	1	-	1	4	4	0
Total	24	9	2	13	29	31	-2

== Results ==
=== Soviet period ===
Season	Competition	Round	Opponent	Home	Away	Aggregate
1965–66	UEFA Cup Winners' Cup	First Round	(Northern Ireland) Coleraine	4–0	6–1	10–1
1965–66	UEFA Cup Winners' Cup	Second Round	(Norway) Rosenborg	2–0	4–1	6–1
1965–66	UEFA Cup Winners' Cup	Quarter-finals	(Scotland) Celtic	1–1	0–3	1–4
1967–68	European Cup	First round	(Scotland) Celtic	1–1	2–1	3–2
1967–68	European Cup	Second Round	(Poland) Górnik Zabrze	1–2	1–1	2–3
1968–69	European Cup	First round	(Poland) Ruch Chorzów	Withdrew by decision of the Football Federation of the Soviet Union during Warsaw Pact invasion of Czechoslovakia		
1969–70	European Cup	First round	Austria Wien	3–1	2–1	5–2
1969–70	European Cup	Second Round	(Italy) Fiorentina	1–2	1–1	2–3
1972–73	European Cup	First round	(Austria) Wacker Innsbruck	2–0	1–0	3–0
1972–73	European Cup	Second round	(Poland) Górnik Zabrze	2–0	1–2	3–2
1972–73	European Cup	Quarter-finals	(Spain) Real Madrid	0–0	0–3	0–3
1973–74	UEFA Cup	First round	(Norway) Fredrikstad	4–0	1–0	5–0
1973–74	UEFA Cup	Second round	(Denmark) B 1903	1–0	2–1	3–1
1973–74	UEFA Cup	Third Round	(West Germany) VfB Stuttgart	2–0	0–3	2–3
1974–75	UEFA Cup Winners' Cup	First round	(Bulgaria) CSKA Sofia	1–0	1–0	2–0
1974–75	UEFA Cup Winners' Cup	Second round	(West Germany) Eintracht Frankfurt	2–1	3–2	5–3
1974–75	UEFA Cup Winners' Cup	Quarter-finals	(Turkey) Bursaspor	2–0	1–0	3–0
1974–75	UEFA Cup Winners' Cup	Semi-finals	(Netherlands) PSV Eindhoven	3–0	1–2	4–2
1974–75	UEFA Cup Winners' Cup	Final	(Hungary) Ferencváros	Basel, Switzerland		3–0
1975	UEFA Super Cup	1975 European Super Cup	(West Germany) Bayern Munich	1–0	2–0	3–0
1975–76	European Cup	First round	(Greece) Olympiacos	1–0	2–2	3–2
1975–76	European Cup	Second round	(Iceland) ÍA	3–0	2–0	5–0
1975–76	European Cup	Quarter-finals	(France) Saint-Étienne	2–0	0–3	2–3
1976–77	European Cup	First round	(Socialist Federal Republic of Yugoslavia) Partizan	3–0	2–0	5–0
1976–77	European Cup	Second round	(Greece) PAOK	4–0	2–0	6–0
1976–77	European Cup	Quarter-finals	(West Germany) Bayern Munich	2–0	0–1	2–1
1976–77	European Cup	Semi-finals	(West Germany) Borussia Mönchengladbach	1–0	0–2	1–2
1977–78	UEFA Cup	First round	(West Germany) Eintracht Braunschweig	1–1	0–0	1–1 (a)
1978–79	European Cup	First round	(Finland) Haka	3–1	1–0	4–1
1978–79	European Cup	Second round	(Sweden) Malmö FF	0–0	0–2	0–2
1979–80	UEFA Cup	First Round	(Bulgaria) CSKA Sofia	2–1	1–1	3–2
1979–80	UEFA Cup	Second Round	(Czechoslovakia) FC Baník Ostrava	2–0	0–1	2–1
1979–80	UEFA Cup	Third Round	(Bulgaria) Lokomotiv Sofia	2–1	0–1	2–2 (a)
1980–81	UEFA Cup	First round	(Bulgaria) Levski Sofia	1–1	0–0	1–1 (a)
1981–82	European Cup	First Round	(Turkey) Trabzonspor	1–0	1–1	2–1
1981–82	European Cup	Second Round	Austria Wien	1–1	1–0	2–1
1981–82	European Cup	Quarter-finals	(England) Aston Villa	0–0	0–2	0–2
1982–83	European Cup	First Round	(Switzerland) Grasshopper	3–0	1–0	4–0
1982–83	European Cup	Second Round	(Albania) 17 Nëntori	17 Nëntori withdrew		
1982–83	European Cup	Quarter-finals	(West Germany) Hamburger SV	0–3	2–1	2–4
1983–84	UEFA Cup	First round	(France) Laval	0–0	0–1	0–1
1985–86	UEFA Cup Winners' Cup	First Round	(Netherlands) Utrecht	4–1	1–2	5–3
1985–86	UEFA Cup Winners' Cup	Second Round	(Romania) Universitatea Craiova	3–0	2–2	5–2
1985–86	UEFA Cup Winners' Cup	Quarter-finals	(Austria) Rapid Wien	5–1	4–1	9–2
1985–86	UEFA Cup Winners' Cup	Semi-finals	(Czechoslovakia) Dukla Prague	3–0	1–1	4–1
1985–86	UEFA Cup Winners' Cup	Final	(Spain) Atlético Madrid	Lyon, France		3–0
1986	UEFA Super Cup	1986 European Super Cup	(Romania) Steaua București	Stade Louis II, Monaco		0–1
1986–87	European Cup	First Round	(Bulgaria) Beroe Stara Zagora	2–0	1–1	3–1
1986–87	European Cup	Second Round	(Scotland) Celtic	3–1	1–1	4–2
1986–87	European Cup	Quarter-finals	(Turkey) Beşiktaş	2–0	5–0	7–0
1986–87	European Cup	Semi-finals	(Portugal) Porto	1–2	1–2	2–4
1987–88	European Cup	First round	(Scotland) Rangers	1–0	0–2	1–2
1989–90	UEFA Cup	First Round	(Hungary) MTK Hungária	4–0	2–1	6–1
1989–90	UEFA Cup	Second Round	(Czechoslovakia) Baník Ostrava	3–0	1–1	4–1
1989–90	UEFA Cup	Third Round	(Italy) Fiorentina	0–0	0–1	0–1
1990–91	UEFA Cup Winners' Cup	First Round	(Finland) KuPS	4–0	2–2	6–2
1990–91	UEFA Cup Winners' Cup	Second Round	(Czechoslovakia) Dukla Prague	1–0	2–2	3–2
1990–91	UEFA Cup Winners' Cup	Quarter-finals	(Spain) Barcelona	2–3	1–1	3–4
1991–92	European Cup	First round	(Finland) HJK	3–0	1–0	4–0
1991–92	European Cup	Second round	(Denmark) Brøndby	1–1	1–0	2–1
1991–92	European Cup	Group Stage (Group B)	(Portugal) Benfica	1–0	0–5	Fourth place
1991–92	European Cup	Group Stage (Group B)	(Czechoslovakia) Sparta Prague	1–0	1–2	Fourth place
1991–92	European Cup	Group Stage (Group B)	(Spain) Barcelona	0–2	0–3	Fourth place

=== Before to season 2013-2014 ===
Season	Competition	Round	Opponent	Home	Away	Aggregate
1992–93	UEFA Cup	First round	(Austria) Rapid Wien	1–0	2–3	3–3 (a)
1992–93	UEFA Cup	Second round	(Belgium) Anderlecht	0–3	2–4	2–7
1993–94	UEFA Champions League	First round	(Spain) Barcelona	3–1	1–4	4–5
1994–95	UEFA Champions League	Qualifying round	(Denmark) Silkeborg	3–1	0–0	3–1
1994–95	UEFA Champions League	Group Stage (Group B)	(Germany) Bayern Munich	1–4	0–1	Fourth place
1994–95	UEFA Champions League	Group Stage (Group B)	(France) Paris Saint-Germain	1–2	0–1	Fourth place
1994–95	UEFA Champions League	Group Stage (Group B)	(Russia) Spartak Moscow	3–2	0–1	Fourth place
1995–96	UEFA Champions League	Qualifying round	(Denmark) AaB	1–0	3–1	4–1
1996–97	UEFA Champions League	Qualifying Round	(Austria) Rapid Wien	2–4	0–2	2–6
1996–97	UEFA Cup (Transfer from UCL)	First Round	(Switzerland) Neuchâtel Xamax	0–0	1–2	1–2
1997–98	UEFA Champions League	First Qualifying Round	(Wales) Barry Town	2–0	4–0	6–0
1997–98	UEFA Champions League	Second Qualifying Round	(Denmark) Brøndby	0–1	4–2	4–3
1997–98	UEFA Champions League	Group Stage (Group C)	(Netherlands) PSV Eindhoven	1–1	3–1	First place
1997–98	UEFA Champions League	Group Stage (Group C)	(England) Newcastle United	2–2	0–2	First place
1997–98	UEFA Champions League	Group Stage (Group C)	(Spain) Barcelona	3–0	4–0	First place
1997–98	UEFA Champions League	Quarter-finals	(Italy) Juventus	1–4	1–1	2–5
1998–99	UEFA Champions League	First Qualifying Round	(Wales) Barry Town	8–0	2–1	10–1
1998–99	UEFA Champions League	Second Qualifying Round	(Czech Republic) Sparta Prague	0–1	1–0 (a.e.t.)	1–1 (3–1 p)
1998–99	UEFA Champions League	Group Stage (Group E)	(France) Lens	1–1	3–1	First place
1998–99	UEFA Champions League	Group Stage (Group E)	(England) Arsenal	3–1	1–1	First place
1998–99	UEFA Champions League	Group Stage (Group E)	(Greece) Panathinaikos	2–1	1–2	First place
1998–99	UEFA Champions League	Quarter-finals	(Spain) Real Madrid	2–0	1–1	3–1
1998–99	UEFA Champions League	Semi-finals	(Germany) Bayern Munich	3–3	0–1	3–4
1999–2000	UEFA Champions League	Second Qualifying Round	(Lithuania) Žalgiris Vilnius	2–0	1–0	3–0
1999–2000	UEFA Champions League	Third Qualifying Round	(Denmark) AaB	2–2	2–1	4–3
1999–2000	UEFA Champions League	First Group Stage (Group A)	(Italy) Lazio	0–1	1–2	Second place
1999–2000	UEFA Champions League	First Group Stage (Group A)	(Germany) Bayer Leverkusen	4–2	1–1	Second place
1999–2000	UEFA Champions League	First Group Stage (Group A)	(Slovenia) Maribor	0–1	2–1	Second place
1999–2000	UEFA Champions League	Second Group Stage (Group C)	(Germany) Bayern Munich	2–0	1–2	Third place
1999–2000	UEFA Champions League	Second Group Stage (Group C)	(Spain) Real Madrid	1–2	2–2	Third place
1999–2000	UEFA Champions League	Second Group Stage (Group C)	(Norway) Rosenborg	2–1	2–1	Third place
2000–01	UEFA Champions League	Third Qualifying Round	(Federal Republic of Yugoslavia) Red Star Belgrade	0–0	1–1	1–1 (a)
2000–01	UEFA Champions League	Group Stage (Group G)	(Belgium) Anderlecht	4–0	2–4	Fourth place
2000–01	UEFA Champions League	Group Stage (Group G)	(England) Manchester United	0–0	0–1	Fourth place
2000–01	UEFA Champions League	Group Stage (Group G)	(Netherlands) PSV Eindhoven	0–1	1–2	Fourth place
2001–02	UEFA Champions League	Third Qualifying Round	(Romania) Steaua București	1–1	4–2	5–3
2001–02	UEFA Champions League	Group Stage (Group B)	(England) Liverpool	1–2	0–1	Fourth place
2001–02	UEFA Champions League	Group Stage (Group B)	(Portugal) Boavista	1–0	1–3	Fourth place
2001–02	UEFA Champions League	Group Stage (Group B)	(Germany) Borussia Dortmund	2–2	0–1	Fourth place
2002–03	UEFA Champions League	Second Qualifying Round	(Armenia) Pyunik	4–0	2–2	6–2
2002–03	UEFA Champions League	Third Qualifying Round	(Bulgaria) Levski Sofia	1–0	1–0	2–0
2002–03	UEFA Champions League	Group Stage (Group E)	(Italy) Juventus	1–2	0–5	Third place
2002–03	UEFA Champions League	Group Stage (Group E)	(England) Newcastle United	2–0	1–2	Third place
2002–03	UEFA Champions League	Group Stage (Group E)	(Netherlands) Feyenoord	2–0	0–0	Third place
2002–03	UEFA Cup (Transfer from UCL)	Third Round	(Turkey) Beşiktaş	0–0	1–3	1–3
2003–04	UEFA Champions League	Third Qualifying Round	(Croatia) Dinamo Zagreb	3–1	2–0	5–1
2003–04	UEFA Champions League	Group Stage (Group B)	(England) Arsenal	2–1	0–1	Fourth place
2003–04	UEFA Champions League	Group Stage (Group B)	(Russia) Lokomotiv Moscow	2–0	2–3	Fourth place
2003–04	UEFA Champions League	Group Stage (Group B)	(Italy) Internazionale	1–1	1–2	Fourth place
2004–05	UEFA Champions League	Third Qualifying Round	(Turkey) Trabzonspor	1–2	2–0	3–2
2004–05	UEFA Champions League	Group Stage (Group B)	(Germany) Bayer Leverkusen	4–2	0–3	Third place
2004–05	UEFA Champions League	Group Stage (Group B)	(Spain) Real Madrid	2–2	0–1	Third place
2004–05	UEFA Champions League	Group Stage (Group B)	(Italy) Roma	2–0	3–0	Third place
2004–05	UEFA Cup (Transfer from UCL)	Round of 32	(Spain) Villarreal	0–0	0–2	0–2
2005–06	UEFA Champions League	Second Qualifying Round	(Switzerland) Thun	2–2	0–1	2–3
2006–07	UEFA Champions League	Second Qualifying Round	(Latvia) Liepājas Metalurgs	4–0	4–1	8–1
2006–07	UEFA Champions League	Third Qualifying Round	(Turkey) Fenerbahçe	3–1	2–2	5–3
2006–07	UEFA Champions League	Group Stage (Group E)	(France) Lyon	0–3	0–1	Fourth place
2006–07	UEFA Champions League	Group Stage (Group E)	(Spain) Real Madrid	2–2	1–5	Fourth place
2006–07	UEFA Champions League	Group Stage (Group E)	(Romania) Steaua București	1–4	1–1	Fourth place
2007–08	UEFA Champions League	Third Qualifying Round	(Bosnia and Herzegovina) Sarajevo	3–0	1–0	4–0
2007–08	UEFA Champions League	Group Stage (Group F)	(England) Manchester United	2–4	0–4	Fourth place
2007–08	UEFA Champions League	Group Stage (Group F)	(Italy) Roma	1–4	0–2	Fourth place
2007–08	UEFA Champions League	Group Stage (Group F)	(Portugal) Sporting CP	1–2	0–3	Fourth place
2008–09	UEFA Champions League	Second Qualifying Round	(Republic of Ireland) Drogheda United	2–2	2–1	4–3
2008–09	UEFA Champions League	Third Qualifying Round	(Russia) Spartak Moscow	4–1	4–1	8–2
2008–09	UEFA Champions League	Group Stage (Group G)	(Portugal) Porto	1–2	1–0	Third place
2008–09	UEFA Champions League	Group Stage (Group G)	(England) Arsenal	1–1	0–1	Third place
2008–09	UEFA Champions League	Group Stage (Group G)	(Turkey) Fenerbahçe	1–0	0–0	Third place
2008–09	UEFA Cup (Transfer from UCL)	Round of 32	(Spain) Valencia	1–1	2–2	3–3 (a)
2008–09	UEFA Cup (Transfer from UCL)	Round of 16	(Ukraine) Metalist Kharkiv	1–0	2–3	3–3 (a)
2008–09	UEFA Cup (Transfer from UCL)	Quarter-finals	(France) Paris Saint-Germain	3–0	0–0	3–0
2008–09	UEFA Cup (Transfer from UCL)	Semi-finals	(Ukraine) Shakhtar Donetsk	1–1	1–2	2–3
2009–10	UEFA Champions League	Group Stage (Group F)	(Spain) Barcelona	1–2	0–2	Fourth place
2009–10	UEFA Champions League	Group Stage (Group F)	(Italy) Internazionale	1–2	0–0	Fourth place
2009–10	UEFA Champions League	Group Stage (Group F)	(Russia) Rubin Kazan	3–1	0–0	Fourth place
2010–11	UEFA Champions League	Third Qualifying Round	(Belgium) Gent	3–0	3–1	6–1
2010–11	UEFA Champions League	Play-off Round	(Netherlands) Ajax	1–1	1–2	2–3
2010–11	UEFA Europa League (Transfer from UCL)	Group Stage (Group E)	(Belarus) BATE Borisov	2–2	4–1	First place
2010–11	UEFA Europa League (Transfer from UCL)	Group Stage (Group E)	(Netherlands) AZ	2–0	2–1	First place
2010–11	UEFA Europa League (Transfer from UCL)	Group Stage (Group E)	(Moldova) Sheriff Tiraspol	0–0	0–2	First place
2010–11	UEFA Europa League (Transfer from UCL)	Round of 32	(Turkey) Beşiktaş	4–0	4–1	8–1
2010–11	UEFA Europa League (Transfer from UCL)	Round of 16	(England) Manchester City	2–0	0–1	2–1
2010–11	UEFA Europa League (Transfer from UCL)	Quarter-finals	(Portugal) Braga	1–1	0–0	1–1 (a)
2011–12	UEFA Champions League	Third Qualifying Round	(Russia) Rubin Kazan	0–2	1–2	2–4
2011–12	UEFA Europa League (Transfer from UCL)	Play-off Round	(Bulgaria) Litex Lovech	1–0	2–1	3–1
2011–12	UEFA Europa League (Transfer from UCL)	Group Stage (Group E)	(Turkey) Beşiktaş	1–0	0–1	Third place
2011–12	UEFA Europa League (Transfer from UCL)	Group Stage (Group E)	(England) Stoke City	1–1	1–1	Third place
2011–12	UEFA Europa League (Transfer from UCL)	Group Stage (Group E)	(Israel) Maccabi Tel Aviv	3–3	1–1	Third place
2012–13	UEFA Champions League	Third Qualifying Round	(Netherlands) Feyenoord	2–1	1–0	3–1
2012–13	UEFA Champions League	Play-off Round	(Germany) Borussia Mönchengladbach	1–2	3–1	4–3
2012–13	UEFA Champions League	Group Stage (Group A)	(France) Paris Saint-Germain	0–2	1–4	Third place
2012–13	UEFA Champions League	Group Stage (Group A)	(Portugal) Porto	0–0	2–3	Third place
2012–13	UEFA Champions League	Group Stage (Group A)	(Croatia) Dinamo Zagreb	2–0	1–1	Third place
2012–13	UEFA Europa League (Transfer from UCL)	Round of 32	(France) Bordeaux	1–1	0–1	1–2
2013–14	UEFA Europa League	Play-off Round	(Kazakhstan) Aktobe	5–1	3–2	8–3
2013–14	UEFA Europa League	Group Stage (Group G)	(Belgium) Genk	0–1	1–3	Second place
2013–14	UEFA Europa League	Group Stage (Group G)	(Austria) Rapid Wien	3–1	2–2	Second place
2013–14	UEFA Europa League	Group Stage (Group G)	(Switzerland) Thun	3–0	2–0	Second place
2013–14	UEFA Europa League	Round of 32	(Spain) Valencia	0–2	0–0	0–2

=== During the Russo-Ukrainian war - largest conflict in Europe since World War II ===
Season	Competition	Round	Opponent	Home until 2021/ Neutral	Away	Aggregate
2014–15	UEFA Europa League	Group Stage (Group J)	(Denmark) AaB	2–0	0–3	First place
2014–15	UEFA Europa League	Group Stage (Group J)	(Romania) Steaua București	3–1	2–0	First place
2014–15	UEFA Europa League	Group Stage (Group J)	(Portugal) Rio Ave	2–0	3–0	First place
2014–15	UEFA Europa League	Round of 32	(France) Guingamp	3–1	1–2	4–3
2014–15	UEFA Europa League	Round of 16	(England) Everton	5–2	1–2	6–4
2014–15	UEFA Europa League	Quarter-finals	(Italy) Fiorentina	1–1	0–2	1–3
2015–16	UEFA Champions League	Group Stage (Group G)	(England) Chelsea	0–0	1–2	Second place
2015–16	UEFA Champions League	Group Stage (Group G)	(Portugal) Porto	2–2	2–0	Second place
2015–16	UEFA Champions League	Group Stage (Group G)	(Israel) Maccabi Tel Aviv	1–0	2–0	Second place
2015–16	UEFA Champions League	Round of 16	(England) Manchester City	1–3	0–0	1–3
2016–17	UEFA Champions League	Group Stage (Group B)	(Italy) Napoli	1–2	0–0	Fourth place
2016–17	UEFA Champions League	Group Stage (Group B)	(Portugal) Benfica	0–2	0–1	Fourth place
2016–17	UEFA Champions League	Group Stage (Group B)	(Turkey) Beşiktaş	6–0	1–1	Fourth place
2017–18	UEFA Champions League	Third Qualifying Round	(Switzerland) Young Boys	3–1	0–2	3–3 (a)
2017–18	UEFA Europa League (Transfer from UCL)	Play-off Round	(Portugal) Marítimo	3–1	0–0	3–1
2017–18	UEFA Europa League (Transfer from UCL)	Group Stage (Group B)	(Switzerland) Young Boys	2–2	1–0	First place
2017–18	UEFA Europa League (Transfer from UCL)	Group Stage (Group B)	(Serbia) Partizan	4–1	3–2	First place
2017–18	UEFA Europa League (Transfer from UCL)	Group Stage (Group B)	(Albania) Skënderbeu	3–1	2–3	First place
2017–18	UEFA Europa League (Transfer from UCL)	Round of 32	(Greece) AEK Athens	0–0	1–1	1–1 (a)
2017–18	UEFA Europa League (Transfer from UCL)	Round of 16	(Italy) Lazio	0–2	2–2	2–4
2018–19	UEFA Champions League	Third Qualifying Round	(Czech Republic) Slavia Prague	2–0	1–1	3–1
2018–19	UEFA Champions League	Play-off Round	(Netherlands) Ajax	0–0	1–3	1–3
2018–19	UEFA Europa League (Transfer from UCL)	Group Stage (Group K)	(France) Rennes	3–1	2–1	First place
2018–19	UEFA Europa League (Transfer from UCL)	Group Stage (Group K)	(Czech Republic) Jablonec	0–1	2–2	First place
2018–19	UEFA Europa League (Transfer from UCL)	Group Stage (Group K)	(Kazakhstan) Astana	2–2	1–0	First place
2018–19	UEFA Europa League (Transfer from UCL)	Round of 32	(Greece) Olympiacos	1–0	2–2	3–2
2018–19	UEFA Europa League (Transfer from UCL)	Round of 16	(England) Chelsea	0–5	0–3	0–8
2019–20	UEFA Champions League	Third Qualifying Round	(Belgium) Club Brugge	3–3	0–1	3–4
2019–20	UEFA Europa League (Transfer from UCL)	Group Stage (Group B)	(Denmark) Copenhagen	1–1	1–1	Third place
2019–20	UEFA Europa League (Transfer from UCL)	Group Stage (Group B)	(Sweden) Malmö FF	1–0	3–4	Third place
2019–20	UEFA Europa League (Transfer from UCL)	Group Stage (Group B)	(Switzerland) Lugano	1–1	0–0	Third place
2020–21	UEFA Champions League	Third Qualifying Round	(Netherlands) AZ	2−0	—N/a	—N/a
2020–21	UEFA Champions League	Play-off round	(Belgium) Gent	3−0	2−1	5−1
2020–21	UEFA Champions League	Group Stage (Group G)	(Italy) Juventus	0–2	0–3	Third place
2020–21	UEFA Champions League	Group Stage (Group G)	(Spain) Barcelona	0–4	1–2	Third place
2020–21	UEFA Champions League	Group Stage (Group G)	(Hungary) Ferencváros	1–0	2–2	Third place
2020–21	UEFA Europa League (Transfer from UCL)	Round of 32	(Belgium) Club Brugge	1–1	1–0	2–1
2020–21	UEFA Europa League (Transfer from UCL)	Round of 16	(Spain) Villarreal	0–2	0–2	0–4
2021–22	UEFA Champions League	Group Stage (Group E)	(Portugal) Benfica	0–0	0–2	Fourth place
2021–22	UEFA Champions League	Group Stage (Group E)	(Germany) Bayern Munich	1–2	0–5	Fourth place
2021–22	UEFA Champions League	Group Stage (Group E)	(Spain) Barcelona	0–1	0–1	Fourth place
2022–23	UEFA Champions League	Second Qualifying Round	(Turkey) Fenerbahçe	0–0 Ld	2–1 (a.e.t.)	2–1
2022–23	UEFA Champions League	Third Qualifying Round	(Austria) Sturm Graz	1–0 Ld	2–1 (a.e.t.)	3–1
2022–23	UEFA Champions League	Play-Off Round	(Portugal) Benfica	0–2 Ld	0–3	0–5
2022–23	UEFA Europa League (Transfer from UCL)	Group Stage (Group B)	(Turkey) Fenerbahçe	0–2 Ld	1–2	Fourth place
2022–23	UEFA Europa League (Transfer from UCL)	Group Stage (Group B)	(Cyprus) AEK Larnaca	0–1 Ld	3–3	Fourth place
2022–23	UEFA Europa League (Transfer from UCL)	Group Stage (Group B)	(France) Rennes	0–2 Ld	1–2	Fourth place
2023–24	UEFA Europa Conference League	Third Qualifying Round	(Greece) Aris	2−1 (a.e.t.) B	0–1	2−2 (6−5 p)
2023–24	UEFA Europa Conference League	Play-Off Round	(Turkey) Beşiktaş	2–3 B	0–1	2–4
2024–25	UEFA Champions League	Second Qualifying Round	(Serbia) Partizan	6–2 Lb	3–0	9–2
2024–25	UEFA Champions League	Third Qualifying Round	(Scotland) Rangers	1–1 Lb	2–0	3–1
2024–25	UEFA Champions League	Play-Off Round	(Austria) Red Bull Salzburg	0–2 Lb	1–1	1–3
2024–25	UEFA Europa League (Transfer from UCL)	League Phase	(Italy) Lazio	0–3 H	—N/a	34th
2024–25	UEFA Europa League (Transfer from UCL)	League Phase	(Germany) TSG Hoffenheim	—N/a	0–2	34th
2024–25	UEFA Europa League (Transfer from UCL)	League Phase	(Italy) Roma	—N/a	0–1	34th
2024–25	UEFA Europa League (Transfer from UCL)	League Phase	(Hungary) Ferencváros	0–4 H	—N/a	34th
2024–25	UEFA Europa League (Transfer from UCL)	League Phase	(Czech Republic) Viktoria Plzeň	1–2 H	—N/a	34th
2024–25	UEFA Europa League (Transfer from UCL)	League Phase	(Spain) Real Sociedad	—N/a	0–3	34th
2024–25	UEFA Europa League (Transfer from UCL)	League Phase	(Turkey) Galatasaray	—N/a	3–3	34th
2024–25	UEFA Europa League (Transfer from UCL)	League Phase	(Latvia) RFS	1–0 H	—N/a	34th
2025−26	UEFA Champions League	Second Qualifying Round	(Malta) Ħamrun Spartans	3−0 Lb	3−0	6−0
2025−26	UEFA Champions League	Third Qualifying Round	(Cyprus) Pafos	0–1 Lb	0–2	0–3
2025–26	UEFA Europa League (Transfer from UCL)	Play-Off Round	(Israel) Maccabi Tel Aviv	1–0 Lb	1–3	2–3
2025–26	UEFA Conference League (Transfer from UEL)	League Phase	(England) Crystal Palace	0–2 Lb	—N/a	27th
2025–26	UEFA Conference League (Transfer from UEL)	League Phase	(Turkey) Samsunspor	—N/a	0–3	27th
2025–26	UEFA Conference League (Transfer from UEL)	League Phase	(Bosnia and Herzegovina) Zrinjski Mostar	6−0 Lb	—N/a	27th
2025–26	UEFA Conference League (Transfer from UEL)	League Phase	(Cyprus) Omonia	—N/a	0–2	27th
2025–26	UEFA Conference League (Transfer from UEL)	League Phase	(Italy) Fiorentina	—N/a	1–2	27th
2025–26	UEFA Conference League (Transfer from UEL)	League Phase	(Armenia) Noah	2–0 Lb	—N/a	27th
2026–27	UEFA Europa League	First Qualifying Round	(Romania) Universitatea Clui	0–0 Lb	0–0 (a.e.t.)	0−0 (4−2 p)
2026–27	UEFA Europa League	Second Qualifying Round	(Greece) PAOK	2–3 Lb	0–2	2–5
2026–27	UEFA Conference League (Transfer from UEL)	Third Qualifying Round	(Azerbaijan) Qarabağ	1–0 Lb	0–2	1–2

Note: Lb - Lublin, Poland; Ld - Łódź, Poland; H - Hamburg, Germany; B - Bucharest, Romania.

== Finals ==
Year	Competition	Opposing team	Score	Venue	WINER
1975	European Cup Winners Cup	(Hungary) Ferencváros	3–0	(Switzerland) St. Jakob Stadium, Basel	(Soviet Union) FC Dynamo Kyiv
1975	European Super Cup	(West Germany) Bayern Munich	1-0	(West Germany) Olympiastadion Munich	(Soviet Union) FC Dynamo Kyiv
1975	European Super Cup	(West Germany) Bayern Munich	2-0	(Soviet Union) Central Stadium Kyiv	(Soviet Union) FC Dynamo Kyiv
1986	European Cup Winners' Cup	(Spain) Atlético Madrid	3–0	(France) Stade de Gerland, Lyon	(Soviet Union) FC Dynamo Kyiv
1986	European Super Cup	(Romania) Steaua Bucharest	0–1	Stade Louis II, Monaco	(Romania) Steaua Bucharest

== Lost semi-finals ==
Year	Competition	Opposing team	Home	Away	Aggregate	Final venue	Other semi-finalists	Champions
1977	European Cup	(West Germany) Borussia Mönchengladbach	1–0	0-2	1–2	(Italy) Stadio Olimpico	(England) Liverpool (Switzerland) Zürich	(England) Liverpool
1987	European Cup	(Portugal) Porto	1–2	1–2	2–4	(Austria) Praterstadion	(West Germany) Bayern Munich (Spain) Real Madrid	(Portugal) Porto
1999	Champions League	(Germany) Bayern Munich	3-3	0-1	3–4	(Spain) Camp Nou	(England) Manchester United (Italy) Juventus	(England) Manchester United
2009	UEFA Cup	(Ukraine) Shakhtar Donetsk	1-1	1-2	2–3	(Turkey) Şükrü Saracoğlu Stadium	(Germany) Werder Bremen (Germany) Hamburger SV	(Ukraine) Shakhtar Donetsk

== UEFA coefficient rankings ==
=== UEFA club coefficient ranking ===
As of 1 October 2025

Rank	Team	Points
118	(France) Nantes	13.821
119	(France) Strasbourg	13.821
120	(Netherlands) Twente	13.500
121	(Ukraine) Dynamo Kyiv	13.500
122	(Bosnia and Herzegovina) Borac	13.125
123	(Belgium) Genk	13.000
124	(Belgium) Cercle Brugge	12.750

=== UEFA Rankings since 2004 ===
As of 1 October 2025

Season	Ranking	Movement	Points	Change
2025–26	121	▼ –44	13.500	▼ -10.000
2024–25	77	▼ –9	23.500	▼ -3.000
2023–24	68	▼ –9	26.500	0.00
2022–23	59	▼ –20	26.500	▼ –17.500
2021–22	39	▼ –8	44.000	▼ –3.000
2020–21	31	▼ –5	47.000	▼ –8.000
2019–20	26	▼ –2	55.000	▼ –10.000
2018–19	23	0	65.000	▲ +3.000
2017–18	23	▲ +2	62.000	new points system
2016–17	25	▲ +1	67.526	▲ +1.550
2015–16	26	▲ +1	65.976	▲ +0.943
2014–15	27	▲ +7	65.033	▲ +8.840
2013–14	34	▼ –9	56.193	▼ –12.958
2012–13	25	▲ +6	68.951	▲ +6.925
2011–12	31	▼ –1	62.026	▲ +1.250
2010–11	30	▲ +14	60.776	▲ +17.866
2009–10	44	▼ –3	42.910	▼ –3.460
2008–09	41	▲ +33	46.370	▲ +11.438
2007–08	74	▼ –13	34.932	▲ +5.932
2006–07	61	▲ +2	29.000	▲ +1.000
2005–06	63	▼ –12	28.000	▼ –4.000
2004–05	51	0	32.000	0.000

=== Football Club Elo ranking ===
As of 1 October 2025

Rank	Team	Points
210	(England) Blackburn	1482
211	(Portugal) Gil Vicente	1481
212	(Belgium) Westerlo	1479
213	(Ukraine) Dynamo Kyiv	1478
214	(Turkey) Beşiktaş	1477
215	(Denmark) Randers	1475
216	(Turkey) Trabzonspor	1474

== Record by country ==
As of 30 January 2025

Nation	Pld	W	D	L	GF	GA	Clubs
Albania	2	1	0	1	5	4	Skënderbeu
Armenia	2	1	1	0	6	2	Pyunik
Austria	18	11	3	4	33	21	Austria Wien, Rapid Wien, Wacker Innsbruck, Sturm Graz, Red Bull Salzburg
Belarus	2	1	1	0	6	3	BATE Borisov
Belgium	12	4	2	6	20	21	Anderlecht, Club Brugge, Genk, Gent
Bosnia	2	2	0	0	4	0	Sarajevo
Bulgaria	14	9	4	1	16	7	Beroe, CSKA Sofia, Levski Sofia, Litex Lovech, Lokomotiv Sofia
Croatia	4	3	1	0	8	2	Dinamo Zagreb
Cyprus	2	0	1	1	3	4	AEK Larnaca
Czech Republic	17	7	5	5	22	14	Baník Ostrava, Dukla Prague, Jablonec, Slavia Prague, Sparta Prague, Viktoria Plzeň
Denmark	16	9	5	2	24	15	AaB, B 03, Brøndby, Copenhagen, Silkeborg
England	32	5	9	16	27	46	Arsenal, Aston Villa, Chelsea, Everton, Liverpool, Manchester City, Manchester United, Newcastle United, Stoke City
Finland	6	5	1	0	14	3	Haka, HJK, KuPS
France	22	6	4	12	22	30	Bordeaux, Guingamp, Laval, Lens, Lyon, Paris Saint-Germain, Rennes, Saint-Étienne
Germany	31	12	5	14	36	44	Bayer Leverkusen, Bayern Munich, Borussia Dortmund, Borussia Monchengladbach, Eintracht Braunschweig, Eintracht Frankfurt, Hamburger SV, VfB Stuttgart, TSG Hoffenheim
Greece	14	6	4	4	20	15	AEK Athens, Olympiacos, Panathinaikos, PAOK, Aris Thessaloniki
Hungary	6	4	1	1	12	7	Ferencváros, MTK
Iceland	2	2	0	0	5	0	ÍA
Ireland	2	1	1	0	4	3	Drogheda United
Northern Ireland	2	2	0	0	10	1	Coleraine
Israel	2	2	2	0	7	4	Maccabi Tel Aviv
Italy	28	2	8	18	18	47	Fiorentina, Internazionale, Juventus, Lazio, Napoli, Roma
Kazakhstan	4	3	1	0	11	5	Aktobe, Astana
Latvia	3	3	0	0	9	1	Liepājas Metalurgs, RFS
Lithuania	2	2	0	0	3	0	Žalgiris Vilnius
Moldova	2	0	1	1	0	2	Sheriff Tiraspol
Netherlands	19	9	4	6	28	18	Ajax, AZ, Feyenoord, PSV Eindhoven, Utrecht
Norway	6	6	0	0	15	3	Fredrikstad, Rosenborg
Poland	4	1	1	2	5	5	Górnik
Portugal	26	7	6	13	23	36	Benfica, Boavista, Braga, Marítimo, Porto, Rio Ave, Sporting CP
Romania	9	4	3	2	17	12	Steaua București, Universitatea Craiova
Scotland	10	4	4	2	12	11	Celtic, Rangers
Serbia	8	6	2	0	22	6	Partizan, Red Star Belgrade
Slovenia	2	1	0	1	2	2	Maribor
Spain	34	5	10	19	33	58	Atlético Madrid, Barcelona, Real Madrid, Valencia, Villarreal, Real Sociedad
Sweden	4	1	1	2	4	6	Malmö FF
Switzerland	14	6	5	3	19	11	Grasshopper, Lugano, Thun, Xamax, Young Boys
Russia	10	5	1	4	19	13	Lokomotiv Moscow, Rubin Kazan, Spartak Moscow
Turkey	27	13	7	7	46	24	Beşiktaş, Bursaspor, Fenerbahçe, Trabzonspor, Galatasaray
Ukraine	4	1	1	2	5	6	Metalist Kharkiv, Shakhtar Donetsk
Wales	4	4	0	0	16	1	Barry Town

=== Record with opponents ===
In 1965–1975

Country	Club	Pld	W	D	L	GF	GA	GD
Austria	Austria Wien	2	2	0	0	5	2	+3
Austria	Wacker Innsbruck	2	2	0	0	3	0	+3
Subtotal		4	2	0	0	8	2	+6
Bulgaria	CSKA Sofia	2	2	0	0	2	0	+2
Subtotal		2	2	0	0	2	0	+2
Denmark	B 1903	2	2	0	0	3	1	+2
Subtotal		2	2	0	0	3	1	+2
West Germany	Bayern Munich	2	2	0	0	3	0	+3
West Germany	Eintracht Frankfurt	2	2	0	0	5	3	+2
West Germany	VfB Stuttgart	2	1	0	1	2	3	-1
Subtotal		6	5	0	1	10	6	+4
Hungary	Ferencvárosi	1	1	0	0	3	0	+3
Subtotal		1	1	0	0	3	0	+3
Italy	Fiorentina	2	0	1	1	2	3	-1
Subtotal		2	0	1	1	2	3	-1
Netherlands	PSV Eindhoven	2	1	0	1	4	2	+2
Subtotal		2	1	0	1	4	2	+2
Northern Ireland	Coleraine	2	2	0	0	10	1	+9
Subtotal		2	2	0	0	10	1	+9
Norway	Fredrikstad	2	2	0	0	5	0	+5
Norway	Rosenborg	2	2	0	0	6	1	+5
Subtotal		4	4	0	0	11	1	+10
Poland	Górnik Zabrze	4	1	1	2	5	5	0
Poland	Ruch Chorzów							
Subtotal		4	1	1	2	5	5	0
Scotland	Celtic	4	1	2	1	4	6	-2
Subtotal		4	1	2	1	4	6	-2
Spain	Real Madrid	2	0	1	1	0	3	-3
Subtotal		2	0	1	1	0	3	-3
Turkey	Bursaspor	2	2	0	0	3	0	+3
Subtotal		2	2	0	0	3	0	+3

== Player statistics ==
Players in bold are still active with Dynamo

=== Most appearances (top 10) ===
As of 25 July 2025.

Rank	Player	Appearances	Period
1	(Ukraine) Oleksandr Shovkovskyi	144	1992–2016
2	(Ukraine) Oleh Husyev	98	2003–2018
3	(Ukraine) **Andriy Yarmolenko**	80	2007–2017; 2023–
4	(Soviet Union) Oleh Blokhin	79	1969–1988
5	(Soviet Union) (Ukraine) Serhiy Rebrov	73	1992–2000; 2005–2008
5	(Belarus) Valyantsin Byalkevich	73	1996–2008
5	(Uzbekistan) Maksim Shatskikh	73	1999–2009
8	(Ukraine) Denys Harmash	68	2007–2023
9	(Soviet Union) (Ukraine) Andriy Husin	66	1993–2005
10	(Ukraine) Andriy Nesmachnyi	63	1997–2011

=== Top goalscorers ===
As of 25 July 2025.

Rank	Player	Goals	Period
1	(Soviet Union) (Ukraine) Serhiy Rebrov	31	1992–2000; 2005–2008
2	(Soviet Union) Oleh Blokhin	26	1969–1988
3	(Ukraine) Andriy Shevchenko	25	1993–1999; 2009–2012
4	(Uzbekistan) Maksim Shatskikh	23	1999–2009
5	(Ukraine) Oleh Husyev	22	2003–2018
6	(Ukraine) **Andriy Yarmolenko**	19	2007–2017; 2023–
7	(Belarus) (Ukraine) Artem Milevskyi	16	2002–2013
8	(Soviet Union) Leonid Buryak	14	1973–1984
10	(Brazil) Diogo Rincon	12	2002–2009
10	(Soviet Union) Volodymyr Onyshchenko	12	1970–1971; 1974–1978
