= Miklós Pataki =

Hungarian footballer (1944–2020)

Personal information
- Full name: Miklós Pataki
- Date of birth: December 4, 1944
- Place of birth: Fél, Komárom, Hungary
- Date of death: December 7, 2020 (aged 76)
- Place of death: Hungary
- Height: 1.72 m (5 ft 8 in)
- Position: Centre-back

Youth career
- ???–1964: Nagymányoki Bányász

Senior career*
Years	Team	Apps	(Gls)
1964–1967	Komlói Bányász SK	41	(11)
1968	Szegedi EAC		
1969	Komlói Bányász SK	21	(3)
1970–1974	Szegedi EAC	84	(5)
1974–1976	Ferencvárosi	3	(0)
1976–1978	Építők		
- * Club domestic league appearances and goals

Miklós Pataki (December 4, 1944 – December 7, 2020) was a Hungarian footballer and lawyer. He played for various Hungarian clubs throughout the late 1960s and the 1970s but was known for his brief stint with Ferencvárosi.

== Career ==
Pataki began his career by playing for Nagymányoki Bányász within his youth career before playing for Komlói Bányász SK for the 1964 Nemzeti Bajnokság I. He continued to play for a few seasons until he made his first season with Szegedi EAC in 1968. Following a brief return to Komlói Bányász in 1969, he would fully play for Szegedi throughout the early 1970s. By the time the 1973–74 Nemzeti Bajnokság I ended, he made 128 games and scored 16 goals for Szegedi.

Pataki was then signed to play for Ferencvárosi for their 1974–75 season. He wouldn't make an appearance throughout the Nemzeti Bajnokság I that season as the club would end up in third place that season. However, the 1974–75 European Cup Winners' Cup that same season would be far more significant for Pataki as he would make his debut during the first home match in a 1–1 draw against Liverpool. The club would continue to advance through the tournament as Pataki made his second appearance for Ferencváros during the 1975 European Cup Winners' Cup final where he was a substitute for the injured László Bálint. The club would end up as runners-up in the tournament following a 3–0 defeat against Dynamo Kyiv. He then only made one appearance within the 1975–76 season within the Liberation Cup that season before spending the remainder of his career with Építők until his retirement in 1978.

== Personal life ==
Pataki had also gained a law degree after his graduation from the University of Szeged following the advice from his brother and served as a legal adviser following his retirement from professional football. He also served as a player-coach for Dabas.

Pataki died on December 7, 2020, from illness, three days after his 76th birthday.
