= Ferenc Eipel =

Hungarian footballer (1949–2022)

Personal information
- Full name: Ferenc Eipel
- Date of birth: March 10, 1949
- Place of birth: Budapest, Hungary
- Date of death: October 29, 2022 (aged 73)
- Height: 1.76 m (5 ft 9 in)
- Position: Full-back

Youth career
- 1966–1973: Ferencvárosi TC

Senior career*
Years	Team	Apps	(Gls)
1969–1976	Ferencvárosi TC	32	(0)
1970–1972	→ Honvéd Gáspár SE (draft)		
1976–1977	Dorogi Bányász	12	(1)
1977–1980	Pénzügyőr SE		

Managerial career
- 1986: Pénzügyőr SE
- 1989–1994: Hungary women
- 2000–2005: Pénzügyőr SE
- 2009–2010: Ferencvárosi TC women
- * Club domestic league appearances and goals

Ferenc Eipel (March 10, 1949 – October 29, 2022) was a Hungarian football player and manager. Nicknamed "Csöpi", he played as a right winger for Ferencvárosi TC during the 1970s. He also served as a manager for Pénzügyőr SE and the Hungary women's national football team throughout the 1990s and the 2000s.

== Club career ==
Eipel began his career within a call-up by a recruiting campaign by a Ferencvárosi TC talent scout in the spring of 1961 for children born in either 1947 or 1948. After being chosen for the youth team, however, it was found out that he was born in 1949 and was told to return in a year. Seeing his depressed state, Feri Agárdi agreed to still allow Eipel within training though he would be called up in the following spring 1962 season. Playing as right winger, he scored two goals during his debut match in 1964 though this early success was stifled by a hepatitis infection which caused him to miss out on nearly a year of training. He made his senior debut on August 6, 1969 in an international match against Austrian club Rapid Wien that ended in a 2–0 victory. He wouldn't play in another match until 1973 during the 1973–74 UEFA Cup first round matches against Polish club Gwardia Warsaw. That same season saw Eipel be a part of the runners-up squad for the 1973–74 Nemzeti Bajnokság I as well as winning the 1973–74 Magyar Kupa. He made his final appearance during a friendly against Czechoslovak club Zbrojovka Brno with a total record of 32 appearances as well playing in the 1974–75 European Cup Winners' Cup. He spent the remainder of his career with Dorogi Bányász and Pénzügyőr SE before retiring in 1980.

== Managerial career ==
Eipel first returned to Pénzügyőr SE as its manager during the 1986 season. He was more known for managing the Hungary women's national football team during the 1990s, participating in the UEFA Women's Euro 1995 qualifiers. He also returned to the Ferencvárosi where he served as a pitch coach for the women's team in the 2009–10 season.

== Personal life ==
Eipel died on October 29, 2022 with his funeral being held on November 21.
