= 1975 Soviet Cup =

1975 Cup of USSR in Football
Кубок СССР

Tournament details
- Country: Soviet Union
- Dates: March 16 – August 9

Final positions
- Champions: Ararat Yerevan
- Runners-up: Zaria Voroshilovgrad

The 1975 Soviet Cup was an association football cup competition of the Soviet Union. The winner of the competition, Ararat Yerevan qualified for the continental tournament.

== Participating teams ==
Enter in First round		Enter in Qualification round
Vysshaya Liga 16/16 teams	Pervaya Liga 4/20 teams	Pervaya Liga 16/20 teams
✓ Chernomorets Odessa; ✓ Torpedo Moscow; ✓ Ararat Yerevan; ✓ Dinamo Moscow; ✓ Zenit Leningrad; ✓ Pakhtakor Tashkent; ✓ Dinamo Tbilisi; ✓ Dnepr Dnepropetrovsk; ✓ Karpaty Lvov; ✓ Shakhter Donetsk; ✓ CSKA Moscow; ✓ Zaria Voroshilovgrad; ✓ SKA Rostov-na-Donu; ✓ Lokomotiv Moscow ✓ Dinamo Kiev; ✓ Spartak Moscow	✓ Kairat Alma-Ata; ✓ Nistru Kishinev; ✓ Dinamo Minsk; ✓ Krylya Sovetov Kuibyshev	✓ Neftchi Baku; ✓ Tavriya Simferopol; ✓ Kuzbass Kemerovo; ✓ Torpedo Kutaisi; ✓ Pamir Dushanbe; ✓ Zvezda Perm; ✓ Shinnik Yaroslavl; ✓ Spartak Ivano-Frankovsk; ✓ Metallurg Zaporozhye; ✓ Spartak Nalchik; ✓ Kuban Krasnodar; ✓ Uralmash Sverdlovsk; ✓ Spartak Ordzhonikidze; ✓ Rubin Kazan; ✓ Metallist Kharkov; ✓ Alga Frunze

Source: []

Notes

- Instead of the first round, Dinamo Kiev started at quarterfinals while Spartak Moscow - the second round.

== Competition schedule ==
=== Preliminary round ===
[Mar 16] 
ALGA Frunze                2-1  Kuban Krasnodar 
  [Almaz Chokmorov 6, Vladimir Melnichenko ? - Alexandr Chugunov 16. Att: 10,000] 
Kuzbass Kemerovo           0-1  ZVEZDA Perm 
  [Vladimir Murin. Att: 200 (in Eshera)] 
METALLURG Zaporozhye       2-1  Spartak Ivano-Frankovsk    [aet] 
  [Viktor Kolodin 85, Alexandr Smirnov 94 - Vladimir Mukomelov 42] 
NEFTCHI Baku               1-0  Torpedo Kutaisi 
PAMIR Dushanbe             2-0  Spartak Nalchik 
  [Alexandr Pogorelov ?, Shuhrat Azamov 42. Att: 11,000] 
Spartak Orjonikidze        1-2  METALLIST Kharkov 
  [Georgiy Kaishauri – Oleg Kramarenko, Sergei Malko. Att: 4,000 (in Sukhumi)] 
TAVRIA Simferopol          3-0  Rubin Kazan 
  [Nikolai Klimov 15, 21, Andrei Cheremisin 41. Att: 10,000] 
UralMash Sverdlovsk        1-2  SHINNIK Yaroslavl 
  [Alexandr Zhuravlyov 18 pen – Alexandr Smirnov 36 pen, Valeriy Sheludko 40. Att: 1,000 (in Adler)]

=== First round ===
[Mar 22] 
Shakhtyor Donetsk          0-1  ZVEZDA Perm 
  [Anatoliy Malyarov 86. Att: 500 (in Sochi)] 
[Mar 23] 
ARARAT Yerevan             4-1  Krylya Sovetov Kuibyshev 
  [Nikolai Kazaryan 55, 75, Arkadiy Andriasyan 71, 77 - Alexandr Kupriyanov 49. Att: 28,000] 
Chernomorets Odessa        1-2  SHINNIK Yaroslavl 
  [Nikolai Mikhailov 15 – Yuriy Panteleyev 11, Dmitriy Dimitriadi 25. Att: 500 (in Adler)] 
CSKA Moskva                3-2  Tavria Simferopol 
  [Vladimir Dorofeyev 23, 37, Boris Kopeikin 62 – Nikolai Klimov 55, Ivan Avdeyev 80. Att: 4,000 (in Sochi)] 
DINAMO Moskva              w/o  Alga Frunze 
DINAMO Tbilisi             2-1  Metallurg Zaporozhye 
  [Manuchar Machaidze 53, 54 - Nikolai Penzin 13. Att: 15,000] 
Dnepr Dnepropetrovsk       1-2  PAMIR Dushanbe 
  [Anatoliy Rodionov (P) 83 og – Vladimir Gulyamhaydarov 44, Viktor Maslov (D) 82 og] 
KARPATY Lvov               4-0  Neftchi Baku 
  [Gennadiy Likhachov 22, 82, Yaroslav Kikot 28, 79. Att: 10,000] 
KAYRAT Alma-Ata            3-0  Torpedo Moskva 
  [Boris Yevdokimov 11, 69, Anatoliy Ionkin 57. Att: 20,000 (in Chimkent)] 
Metallist Kharkov          1-4  PAHTAKOR Tashkent 
  [Iosif Bordash 30 pen – Vassilis Hatzipanagis 14, Vladimir Fyodorov 53, Mikhail An 67 pen, Yevgeniy Zhukov 87. Att: 15,000] 
Nistru Kishinev            0-1  LOKOMOTIV Moskva           [aet] 
  [Vladimir Malinin 118. Att: 20,000] 
ZARYA Voroshilovgrad       1-0  SKA Rostov-na-Donu 
  [Viktor Kuznetsov 28] 
ZENIT Leningrad            1-0  Dinamo Minsk 
  [Anatoliy Zinchenko 4. Att: 7,000 (in Sukhumi)]

=== Second round ===
[Apr 5] 
Zvezda Perm                0-0  KAYRAT Alma-Ata       [pen 2-4] 
  [Att: 1,000 (in Sochi)] 
[Apr 6] 
ARARAT Yerevan             1-0  Karpaty Lvov          [aet] 
  [Levon Ishtoyan 118 pen. Att: 25,000] 
LOKOMOTIV Moskva           2-1  Dinamo Moskva         [aet] 
  [Vladimir Utkin 76, Sergei Kamzulin 103 – Anatoliy Shepel 67. Att: 30,000] 
PAHTAKOR Tashkent          1-1  Spartak Moskva        [pen 5-4] 
  [Yuriy Belov 51 – Alexandr Piskaryov 37. Att: 25,000] 
Pamir Dushanbe             0-0  ZARYA Voroshilovgrad  [pen 2-3] 
  [Att: 20,000] 
Shinnik Yaroslavl          0-1  CSKA Moskva 
  [Boris Kopeikin 61. Att: 1,000 (in Adler)] 
Zenit Leningrad            0-0  DINAMO Tbilisi        [pen 2-4] 
  [Att: 12,000 (in Sochi)]

=== Quarterfinals ===
[Jul 2] 
DINAMO Tbilisi          2-1  Dinamo Kiev           [aet] 
  [Vakhtang Koridze 94, David Kipiani 110 – Viktor Kolotov 109. Att: 35,000] 
Lokomotiv Moskva        1-1  ARARAT Yerevan        [pen 3-5] 
  [Viktor Davydov 50 – Arkadiy Andriasyan 57 pen. Att: 22,000] 
Pahtakor Tashkent       0-0  ZARYA Voroshilovgrad  [pen 2-4] 
  [Att: 30,000] 
[Jul 3] 
CSKA Moskva             3-0  Kayrat Alma-Ata 
  [Boris Kopeikin 5, 71, Sergei Shlapak 54. Att: 15,000]

=== Semifinals ===
[Jul 16] 
ARARAT Yerevan          3-1  Dinamo Tbilisi 
  [Eduard Markarov 47, Sergei Pogosov 58, Nazar Petrosyan 64 – Vakhtang Koridze 78. Att: 68,600] 
ZARYA Voroshilovgrad    2-1  CSKA Moskva              [aet] 
  [Anatoliy Kuksov 26, Vladimir Belousov 110 – Nikolai Hudiyev 69. Att: 30,000]

==== Final ====
9 August 1975

Ararat Yerevan	2 – 1	Zaria Voroshilovgrad
Andriasyan 14'; Markarov 43'	Report	Kuznetsov 8'

Lenin's Central Stadium, Moscow
Attendance: 70,000
Referee: Vladimir Rudnev (Moscow)
