= Petro Slobodyan =

Soviet footballer and Ukrainian coach (1953–2020)

Personal information
- Full name: Petro Petrovych Slobodyan
- Date of birth: 2 July 1953
- Place of birth: Sheparivtsi, Kolomyia Raion, Ukrainian SSR
- Date of death: 15 December 2020 (aged 67)
- Height: 1.77 m (5 ft 9 1/2 in)
- Position: Striker

Youth career
- Kolomyia Football School

Senior career*
Years	Team	Apps	(Gls)
1970–1972	Avanhard Ternopil		
1972–1974	Dnipro Dnipropetrovsk		
1975–1979	Dynamo Kyiv		
1980	Lokomotiv Moscow		

International career
1976	USSR	2	(0)

Managerial career
- 2002–2004: Obolon Kyiv
- 2006–2008: Obolon Kyiv
Medal record
Men's football
Representing Soviet Union
UEFA European Under-23 Championship
Winner	1976 Europe
- * Club domestic league appearances and goals

Petro Petrovych Slobodyan (Ukrainian: Петро Петрович Слободян, Russian: Пётр Петрович Слободян; 2 July 1953 in the village of Sheparivtsi, Stanislav Oblast – 15 December 2020) was a Soviet football player and a Ukrainian coach.

== Honours ==
- Soviet Top League winner: 1975, 1977.
- European Under-23 Championship winner: 1976.

== International career ==
Slobodyan made his debut for USSR on 28 November 1976 in a friendly against Argentina.
