= 1975 Soviet Second League =

Second League
- Season: 1975

1975 Soviet Second League was a Soviet competition in the Soviet Second League.

== Qualifying groups ==
=== Group I [Caucasus and Soviet Turkestan] ===
Pos	Rep	Team	Pld	W	D	L	GF	GA	GD	Pts
1	UZB	Yangiyer	34	18	9	7	62	31	+31	45
2	TKM	Stroitel Ashkhabad	34	19	4	11	66	30	+36	42
3	GEO	Guria Lanchkhuti	34	18	5	11	62	47	+15	41
4	UZB	Hanki Yangiaryk (Note: Yangiaryk changed name to Hanki.)	34	16	9	9	48	38	+10	41
5	GEO	Dila Gori	34	18	4	12	53	39	+14	40
6	UZB	Jizak (Note: Trud Jizak changed name to Jizak.)	34	16	6	12	43	44	−1	38
7	GEO	Metallurg Rustavi	34	15	7	12	45	49	−4	37
8	UZB	Pahtachi Gulistan	34	13	9	12	38	46	−8	35
9	UZB	Neftyanik Fergana	34	14	6	14	41	44	−3	34
10	GEO	Lokomotiv Samtredia	34	13	6	15	55	56	−1	32
11	GEO	Dinamo Zugdidi	34	13	6	15	53	63	−10	32
12	GEO	Dinamo Batumi	34	13	5	16	49	41	+8	31
13	AZE	Progress Kirovabad (Note: Dinamo Kirovabad changed name to Progress.)	34	13	5	16	52	51	+1	31
14	ARM	Shirak Leninakan	34	12	6	16	42	54	−12	30
15	GEO	Mertskhali Makharadze	34	12	5	17	35	56	−21	29
16	UZB	Avtomobilist Termez (Note: Spartak Termez changed name to Avtomobilist.)	34	11	4	19	45	49	−4	26
17	ARM	SKIF Yerevan	34	9	7	18	19	44	−25	25
18	AZE	Hazar Sumgait	34	8	7	19	43	69	−26	23

=== Group II [Centre and Northwest] ===
Pos	Rep	Team	Pld	W	D	L	GF	GA	GD	Pts
1	LTU	Žalgiris Vilnius	34	23	7	4	67	24	+43	53
2	RUS	Dinamo Leningrad	34	20	10	4	58	24	+34	50
3	LVA	Daugava Riga	34	19	12	3	53	22	+31	50
4	RUS	Textilshchik Ivanovo	34	17	11	6	64	30	+34	45
5	RUS	Volga Kalinin	34	16	12	6	47	27	+20	44
6	RUS	Spartak Kostroma	34	17	8	9	51	30	+21	42
7	RUS	Iskra Smolensk	34	16	7	11	43	36	+7	39
8	LTU	Atlantas Klaipeda	34	15	7	12	40	38	+2	37
9	RUS	Dinamo Vologda	34	11	12	11	38	41	−3	34
10	BLR	Bug Brest	34	12	7	15	38	44	−6	31
11	BLR	Dnepr Mogilyov	34	8	13	13	26	42	−16	29
12	RUS	Sever Murmansk	34	10	8	16	35	42	−7	28
13	BLR	GomSelMash Gomel	34	9	10	15	28	47	−19	28
14	RUS	Baltika Kaliningrad	34	9	7	18	33	63	−30	25
15	LVA	Zvejnieks Liepaja	34	7	10	17	30	51	−21	24
16	BLR	Dvina Vitebsk	34	6	7	21	20	57	−37	19
17	RUS	Electron Novgorod	34	4	10	20	15	42	−27	18
18	BLR	Khimik Grodno	34	5	6	23	22	48	−26	16

=== Group III [Russian South] ===
Pos	Team	Pld	W	D	L	GF	GA	GD	Pts
1	Dinamo Makhachkala	38	22	9	7	73	34	+39	53
2	Torpedo Vladimir	38	22	9	7	60	25	+35	53
3	Terek Grozny	38	23	7	8	61	28	+33	53
4	Druzhba Maykop	38	22	6	10	57	29	+28	50
5	Trud Voronezh	38	22	6	10	58	39	+19	50
6	Mashuk Pyatigorsk	38	16	16	6	46	31	+15	48
7	Lokomotiv Kaluga	38	15	13	10	49	37	+12	43
8	RostSelMash Rostov-na-Donu	38	14	15	9	40	32	+8	43
9	Avangard Kursk	38	15	5	18	38	47	−9	35
10	Dinamo Stavropol	38	11	12	15	28	30	−2	34
11	Salyut Belgorod	38	10	14	14	39	41	−2	34
12	Spartak Oryol (Note: Stal Oryol changed name to Spartak.)	38	13	7	18	32	55	−23	33
13	Khimik Novomoskovsk	38	12	8	18	44	59	−15	32
14	Volgar Astrakhan	38	10	11	17	40	46	−6	31
15	Dinamo Bryansk	38	10	10	18	34	50	−16	30
16	Uralan Elista	38	12	6	20	32	51	−19	30
17	Novolipetsk Lipetsk (Note: Metallurg Lipetsk changed name to Novolipetsk.)	38	9	11	18	39	58	−19	29
18	Revtrud Tambov	38	10	8	20	35	50	−15	28
19	Mashinostroitel Tula (Note: Metallurg Tula changed name to Mashinostroitel.)	38	9	10	19	29	51	−22	28
20	Torpedo Taganrog	38	9	5	24	39	80	−41	23

=== Group IV [Volga–Ural] ===
Pos	Team	Pld	W	D	L	GF	GA	GD	Pts
1	Uralets Nizhniy Tagil	32	19	9	4	58	26	+32	47
2	Sokol Saratov	32	18	9	5	45	20	+25	45
3	Torpedo Togliatti	32	16	9	7	50	34	+16	41
4	Volga Gorkiy	32	17	7	8	43	33	+10	41
5	Irtysh Omsk	32	12	11	9	39	34	+5	35
6	Dinamo Kirov	32	10	15	7	31	27	+4	35
7	Khimik Dzerzhinsk	32	12	10	10	37	28	+9	34
8	Metallurg Magnitogorsk	32	12	9	11	35	34	+1	33
9	Rotor Volgograd (Note: Barrikady Volgograd changed name to Rotor.)	32	11	9	12	51	42	+9	31
10	Stroitel Ufa	32	10	11	11	36	47	−11	31
11	Spartak Ryazan	32	10	9	13	37	33	+4	29
12	Druzhba Yoshkar-Ola (Note: Spartak Yoshkar-Ola changed name to Druzhba.)	32	11	6	15	36	48	−12	28
13	Volga Ulyanovsk	32	7	13	12	28	37	−9	27
14	Znamya Truda Orekhovo-Zuyevo	32	9	5	18	41	63	−22	23
15	Neftyanik Tyumen	32	8	6	18	26	40	−14	22
16	Lokomotiv Orenburg	32	8	6	18	25	54	−29	22
17	Zenit Izhevsk	32	5	10	17	28	46	−18	20

=== Group V [Kazakhstan and Siberia] ===
Pos	Rep	Team	Pld	W	D	L	GF	GA	GD	Pts
1	RUS	Amur Blagoveshchensk	34	17	9	8	43	21	+22	43
2	RUS	SKA Khabarovsk	34	18	5	11	49	32	+17	41
3	RUS	Luch Vladivostok	34	17	7	10	42	29	+13	41
4	RUS	Chkalovets Novosibirsk	34	15	9	10	47	27	+20	39
5	KAZ	Tselinnik Tselinograd (Note: Dinamo Tselinograd changed name to Tselinnik.)	34	15	9	10	42	35	+7	39
6	RUS	Avtomobilist Krasnoyarsk	34	16	7	11	45	39	+6	39
7	KAZ	Orbita Kzil-Orda	34	14	8	12	44	36	+8	36
8	KAZ	Khimik Jambul (Note: Alatau Jambul changed name to Khimik.)	34	13	10	11	50	43	+7	36
9	RUS	Dinamo Barnaul	34	15	5	14	46	37	+9	35
10	KAZ	Spartak Semipalatinsk	34	12	11	11	41	37	+4	35
11	KAZ	Traktor Pavlodar	34	14	5	15	41	41	0	33
12	KAZ	Vostok Ust-Kamenogorsk	34	12	9	13	40	47	−7	33
13	KAZ	Gornyak Nikolskiy	34	12	8	14	43	53	−10	32
14	KAZ	Shakhtyor Karaganda	34	12	7	15	43	43	0	31
15	RUS	Selenga Ulan-Ude	34	11	9	14	35	39	−4	31
16	RUS	Torpedo Tomsk	34	11	9	14	33	42	−9	31
17	RUS	Lokomotiv Chita	34	9	8	17	21	41	−20	26
18	RUS	Aviator Irkutsk	34	3	5	26	18	81	−63	11

=== Group VI (Ukraine) ===
Pos	Team	Pld	W	D	L	GF	GA	GD	Pts	Promotion
1	Kryvbas Kryvyi Rih (C)	32	14	13	5	39	20	+19	41	Promoted
2	Avtomobilist Zhytomyr	32	13	14	5	41	21	+20	40	
3	SC Lutsk	32	13	12	7	46	26	+20	38	
4	SC Chernihiv	32	12	13	7	41	33	+8	37	
5	Zirka Kirovohrad	32	13	10	9	37	22	+15	36	
6	Sudnobudivnyk Mykolaiv	32	13	9	10	39	31	+8	35	
7	Dynamo Khmelnytskyi	32	11	12	9	32	25	+7	34	
8	Lokomotyv Vinnytsia	32	11	11	10	41	36	+5	33	
9	Kolos Poltava	32	11	10	11	44	41	+3	32	
10	Bukovyna Chernivtsi	32	10	12	10	34	38	−4	32	
11	Hoverla Uzhhorod	32	11	10	11	23	27	−4	32	
12	Frunzenets Sumy	32	11	9	12	29	29	0	31	
13	FC Tiraspol	32	8	14	10	36	46	−10	30	
14	Atlantyka Sevastopol	32	12	5	15	38	54	−16	29	
15	Avanhard Rovno	32	9	9	14	22	30	−8	27	
16	Lokomotyv Zhdanov	32	5	10	17	26	48	−22	20	
17	Lokomotyv Kherson	32	3	11	18	24	65	−41	17	Avoided relegation

(C) Champions

== Promotion playoffs ==
=== Semifinal group 1 ===
[Riga]

Pos	Rep	Team	Pld	W	D	L	GF	GA	GD	Pts
1	LVA	Daugava Riga	5	3	2	0	8	2	+6	8
2	GEO	Guria Lanchkhuti	5	2	2	1	6	4	+2	6
3	UKR	Avtomobilist Zhitomir	5	1	4	0	2	1	+1	6
4	RUS	Torpedo Vladimir	5	1	3	1	4	4	0	5
5	RUS	Amur Blagoveshchensk	5	1	1	3	3	5	−2	3
6	RUS	Uralets Nizhniy Tagil	5	1	0	4	5	12	−7	2

=== Semifinal group 2 ===
[Ashkhabad]

Pos	Rep	Team	Pld	W	D	L	GF	GA	GD	Pts
1	TKM	Stroitel Ashkhabad	5	4	1	0	9	1	+8	9
2	RUS	Terek Grozny	5	3	1	1	9	7	+2	7
3	UKR	Krivbass Krivoi Rog	5	2	1	2	6	5	+1	5
4	RUS	Torpedo Togliatti	5	1	1	3	2	3	−1	3
5	LTU	Žalgiris Vilnius	5	0	3	2	3	6	−3	3
6	RUS	SKA Khabarovsk	5	1	1	3	3	10	−7	3

=== Semifinal group 3 ===
[Makhachkala]

Pos	Rep	Team	Pld	W	D	L	GF	GA	GD	Pts
1	UZB	Yangiyer	5	5	0	0	8	2	+6	10
2	RUS	Dinamo Makhachkala	5	3	1	1	9	3	+6	7
3	RUS	Dinamo Leningrad	5	3	0	2	6	6	0	6
4	RUS	Sokol Saratov	5	2	1	2	5	3	+2	5
5	RUS	Luch Vladivostok	5	1	0	4	3	7	−4	2
6	UKR	SK Lutsk	5	0	0	5	2	12	−10	0

=== Final group ===
[Chimkent]

Pos	Rep	Team	Pld	W	D	L	GF	GA	GD	Pts	Promotion
1	RUS	Terek Grozny	5	3	2	0	11	4	+7	8	Promoted
2	LVA	Daugava Riga	5	3	2	0	7	4	+3	8	Promoted
3	TKM	Stroitel Ashkhabad	5	2	3	0	8	3	+5	7	Promoted
4	UZB	Yangiyer	5	1	2	2	4	5	−1	4	
5	GEO	Guria Lanchkhuti	5	0	2	3	6	14	−8	2	
6	RUS	Dinamo Makhachkala	5	0	1	4	4	10	−6	1	

Source: rsssf.com
