= 1973–74 Magyar Kupa =

Tournament details
- Country: Hungary

Final positions
- Champions: Ferencvárosi TC
- Runners-up: Komlói Bányász SK

The 1973–74 Magyar Kupa (English: Hungarian Cup) was the 34th season of Hungary's annual knock-out cup football competition.

== Final ==
1 May 1974
17:00 (UTC+2)

Ferencvárosi TC	3–1	Komlói Bányász SK
Mucha 70'; Magyar 77'; Kelemen 90'	Report	Eipel 21' (o.g.)

Népstadion, Budapest
Attendance: 6,000
Referee: Károly Palotai (Hungary)

== See also ==
- 1973–74 Nemzeti Bajnokság I
