= Johannes Beck =

German Jesuit and social ethicist (1922–2020)

Johannes Beck SJ (Germany, 1 November 1922 – 9 May 2020) was a German Jesuit and social ethicist.

== Life ==
Beck joined the Jesuit order in 1948. After the theological training he received, on 31 July 1956 he was ordained at the St. Michael's Church in Munich.

He was particularly involved in the worker and company pastoral care and campaigned for social justice and Catholic social teaching, in particular for the principle of solidarity in large industrial companies. Among other things, he served for many decades as a spiritual advisor to the Catholic Workers' Movement (KAB). As the successor to Franz Prinz SJ, he headed the Werkgemeinschaft christischer Arbeiter in Munich.

From 1979 to 1991, Beck was director of the "Social Seminar" at Münchner Bildungswerk and after his retirement from 1991 to 2012 he was involved in teaching.

He lived in the Jesuit community Pedro Arrupe in the St. Katharina Labouré nursing home in Unterhaching near Munich. He died in May 2020, at the age of 97 in Unterhaching, Bavaria, as a result of COVID-19 during the COVID-19 pandemic in Germany.
