= 1975–76 Magyar Kupa =

Tournament details
- Country: Hungary

Final positions
- Champions: Ferencvárosi TC
- Runners-up: MTK-VM

The 1975–76 Magyar Kupa (English: Hungarian Cup) was the 36th season of Hungary's annual knock-out cup football competition.

== Final ==
1 May 1976
17:00 (UTC+2)

Ferencvárosi TC	1–0	MTK-VM
Szabó 20'	Report

Népstadion, Budapest
Attendance: 15,000
Referee: László Hámori (Hungary)

== See also ==
- 1975–76 Nemzeti Bajnokság I
