= Ferenc Ebedli =

Hungarian footballer (1952–2024)

Personal information
- Full name: Ferenc Ebedli
- Date of birth: September 22, 1952
- Place of birth: Budapest, Hungary
- Date of death: August 5, 2024 (aged 71)
- Place of death: Kiskőrös, Bács-Kiskun, Hungary
- Position: Defender

Youth career
- ????–1971: Ferencvárosi TC

Senior career*
Years	Team	Apps	(Gls)
1971–1975	Ferencvárosi TC	53	(6)
1973–1974	→ Kossuth KFSE (draft)		
1975–1989	Volán SC		

Managerial career
- 1989–1991: Volán SC
- 1992: Debreceni VSC
- 1993–1997: ESMTK
- 1997–1998: Tatabányai
- 1998–1999: Dunaújváros
- 1999: Szeged
- 1999–2000: Ercsi Kinizsi
- 2000–2001: Ferencvárosi TC youth
- 2001: Tatabányai
- 2002: Rojik FC
- 2002–2003: ESMTK
- 2004–2005: Diósgyőri VTK
- * Club domestic league appearances and goals

Ferenc Ebedli (September 22, 1952 – August 5, 2024) was a Hungarian football player and manager. He primarily played for Ferencvárosi TC and Volán SC throughout the 1970s and the 1980s.

== Career as a player ==
He started playing football with his younger brother Zoltán Ebedli within the youth sector of Ferencvárosi TC. Despite being promoted to the senior squad in 1971, he remained as a reserve player until finally making appearances between August and November 1974, making his debut during the 5–0 beating against Telstar] for the Honvéd-Fradi Jubilee Tournament on August 10. He played 6 matches for the senior squad with two of these being international matches and the remainder being within the 1974–75 Nemzeti Bajnokság I. Notably, he saw the most activity within the 1974–75 European Cup Winners' Cup where he made a notable appearance in the 4–1 victory against Welsh club Cardiff City. He then spent the remainder of his career with Volán SC, spending five seasons in the top-flight of Hungarian football with Ebedli overseeing the club get relegated three times.

== Career as a manager ==
Beginning in the 1989–90 Nemzeti Bajnokság II, coached Volán and saw the club promoted in the following season. However, throughout the season, the team parted ways with him due to a change of ownership.

He continued his career with Debreceni VSC, where he was part of the foundation of the later successful team, with footballers such as Tamás Sándor, Tibor Dombi, Zoltán Pető and Csaba Madar. He then managed ESMTK in 1993 before managing Tatabányai in 1997 when the revival of local Hungarian football began. Following minor stunts with other clubs, he then managed Ercsi Kinizsi before working with his former teammate Zoltán Varga to manage Dunaújváros. He was then invited by his former club of Ferencvárosi TC to manage their youth sector for the summer of 2000. He then returned to Tatabányai and ESMTK but soon retired from his managerial career after serving as a director for Diósgyőri VTK for the 2004–05 season.

He also founded the Telki Sports Association and the Telki Football School alongside his wife Zsuzsa Kamocsai where he served as a football coach until his wife died in December 2020.

== Personal life ==
During his final years, he had been suffering from deteriorating mental health and had to be put in a nursing home in Kiskőrös where he had remained for four years with the occasional visit from his brother. He died on August 5, 2024, at the age of 71.
