= Tamás Viczkó =

Hungarian footballer

Tamas Viczko
Personal information
- Date of birth: 14 November 1954 (age 71)
- Place of birth: Hungary
- Position: Defender

Senior career*
Years	Team	Apps	(Gls)
-1976	Ferencvárosi TC	8	(0)
1976-1981	Újpest FC	93	(1)
1981	Szombathelyi Haladás	3	(0)
- * Club domestic league appearances and goals

Tamas Viczko (born 14 November 1954 in Hungary) is a Hungarian retired footballer who last worked as head coach of the Palestine national football team.

== Career ==
Viczko started his senior career with Ferencvárosi TC. In 1976, he signed for Újpest in the Hungarian Nemzeti Bajnokság I, where he made one-hundred and four appearances and scored two goals. After that, he played for Szombathelyi Haladás.
