= Zoltán Ebedli =

Hungarian footballer (born 1953)

Personal information
- Date of birth: 26 October 1953 (age 73)
- Place of birth: Budapest, Hungary
- Position: Midfielder

Youth career
- 1964–1974: Ferencváros

Senior career*
Years	Team	Apps	(Gls)
1974–1984	Ferencváros	295	(47)
1984–1985	Újpest FC	26	(3)
1985–1986	Ferencváros	19	(0)
1986–1987	Erzsébeti Spartacus MTK LE		
1987–1988	Syrianska FC		

International career
1976–1983	Hungary	12	(1)
- * Club domestic league appearances and goals

Zoltán Ebedli (born 26 October 1953) is a Hungarian retired professional footballer who played as a midfielder. He was a member of the Hungary national team.

== Club career ==
Ebedli is a home-grown player of Ferencváros. After Tibor Nyilasi, László Szokolai and László Pogány, he was the team's fourth highest scorer. He played one season for Újpest FC and then again for Ferencváros. At the end of his playing career, he first played for Erzsébeti Spartacus MTK LE, then for smaller Swedish team Syrianska FC until 1988.

== International career ==
Between 1976 and 1983 he played 12 times for the national Hungary national team.

== Personal life ==
Zoltán is the younger brother of fellow footballer Ferenc Ebedli who also played for Ferencvárosi TC.

== Honours ==
- Nemzeti Bajnokság I: 1975–76, 1980–81
- Magyar Kupa: 1974, 1976, 1978
