= 1975–76 Nemzeti Bajnokság I =

Nemzeti Bajnokság I
- Season: 1975–76

Statistics of Nemzeti Bajnokság I in the 1975–76 season.

== Overview ==
It was contested by 16 teams, and Ferencvárosi TC won the championship.

== League standings ==
Pos	Team	Pld	W	D	L	GF	GA	GD	Pts	Qualification
1	Ferencváros (C)	30	20	6	4	65	38	+27	46	Qualification for European Cup first round
2	Videoton	30	18	8	4	61	26	+35	44	Qualification for UEFA Cup first round
3	Újpesti Dózsa	30	18	6	6	79	51	+28	42	Qualification for UEFA Cup first round
4	Budapest Honvéd	30	14	8	8	47	32	+15	36	Qualification for UEFA Cup first round
5	Vasas	30	15	4	11	65	41	+24	34	
6	MTK-VM	30	13	3	14	53	41	+12	29	Qualification for Cup Winners' Cup first round
7	Haladás	30	11	7	12	36	43	−7	29	
8	Salgótarján	30	8	12	10	40	45	−5	28	
9	Tatabányai Bányász	30	11	6	13	41	50	−9	28	
10	Zalaegerszeg	30	9	9	12	47	49	−2	27	
11	Rába ETO Győr	30	7	11	12	36	49	−13	25	
12	Csepel	30	8	9	13	35	48	−13	25	
13	Kaposvár	30	6	12	12	41	52	−11	24	
14	Diósgyőr	30	6	12	12	26	44	−18	24	
15	Békéscsaba	30	8	8	14	25	45	−20	24	
16	SZEOL	30	5	5	20	27	70	−43	15	

Source: rsssf.com
(C) Champions

== Results ==
Home \ Away	BÉK	CSE	DIÓ	FTC	HAL	HON	KAP	MTK	GYŐ	SAL	SZE	TAT	ÚJP	VAS	VID	ZTE
Békéscsaba		2–1	1–0	1–0	0–2	1–1	3–0	0–3	1–1	0–1	1–0	0–3	1–1	2–1	2–3	2–1
Csepel	1–1		2–1	2–3	2–0	0–0	1–1	1–0	2–0	3–0	2–0	1–1	1–1	0–3	0–4	1–2
Diósgyőr	1–0	1–1		0–0	1–1	4–0	2–2	1–0	0–0	0–0	1–0	1–1	2–2	1–0	0–2	2–2
Ferencváros	2–0	2–1	1–0		1–0	4–3	4–2	3–1	2–2	4–0	1–0	4–0	3–8	2–1	1–1	1–0
Haladás	0–0	0–0	3–0	1–3		0–0	2–2	3–1	1–0	2–1	5–1	1–0	2–2	0–3	1–0	1–3
Budapest Honvéd	2–0	0–1	4–1	1–3	3–1		1–0	5–1	3–0	5–2	2–0	0–1	0–1	3–1	3–1	1–0
Kaposvár	1–1	5–2	0–0	1–1	0–2	1–2		1–0	5–0	0–2	3–1	2–1	1–4	2–0	3–3	2–2
MTK-VM	1–0	4–0	4–0	1–3	3–0	1–2	0–0		1–1	3–0	6–0	2–1	1–0	2–1	0–3	3–1
Rába ETO Győr	5–0	3–2	2–2	4–2	1–0	1–1	1–1	0–0		0–0	6–1	0–1	2–0	2–0	0–2	1–1
Salgótarján	0–0	1–1	1–0	2–2	3–0	0–0	2–2	0–3	3–1		1–1	5–2	2–3	3–1	1–3	5–2
SZEOL	1–2	1–0	2–1	0–1	2–3	0–2	2–2	1–0	1–1	1–1		2–1	1–2	2–2	2–4	3–1
Tatabányai Bányász	2–2	2–0	0–0	1–3	1–2	1–0	1–0	4–3	3–1	1–1	2–0		1–3	3–2	2–0	1–1
Újpesti Dózsa	2–1	4–2	7–2	1–4	3–2	1–1	4–0	5–4	3–1	2–1	6–2	3–2		1–0	2–2	3–0
Vasas	3–1	3–3	3–0	3–2	3–0	3–0	2–0	4–1	5–0	1–1	3–0	5–1	5–4		3–2	2–0
Videoton	3–0	2–0	2–0	0–0	3–0	1–1	1–0	1–0	3–0	0–0	4–0	3–1	3–0	2–1		1–1
Zalaegerszeg	3–0	1–2	1–2	1–3	1–1	1–1	5–2	0–4	3–0	2–1	4–0	3–0	2–1	1–1	2–2	

Source: rsssf.com
Legend: Blue = home team win; Yellow = draw; Red = away team win.

== Statistical leaders ==
=== Top goalscorers ===
Rank	Scorer	Club	Goals
1	(Hungary) László Fazekas	Újpesti Dózsa	19
2	(Hungary) István Weimper	Budapest Honvéd	17
3	(Hungary) István Kovács	Vasas SC	15
3	(Hungary) Ferenc Szabó	Ferencvárosi TC	15
5	(Hungary) László Karsai	Videoton SC	13
5	(Hungary) Béla Várady	Vasas SC	13
7	(Hungary) Győző Burcsa	Kaposvári Rákóczi SC	12
7	(Hungary) Ignác Izsó	Vasas SC	12
7	(Hungary) Tibor Nyilasi	Ferencvárosi TC	12
10	(Hungary) István Gass	Vasas SC	10
10	(Hungary) Lajos Kocsis	Budapest Honvéd	10
10	(Hungary) Tibor Wollek	Videoton SC	10

== Attendances ==
#	Club	Average
1	Ferencváros	29,400
2	Budapest Honvéd	14,667
3	Újpest	14,533
4	Vasas	13,567
5	Kaposvár	13,000
6	Békéscsaba	12,333
7	Fehérvár	9,867
8	Diósgyör	9,200
9	Zalaegerszeg	8,933
10	Haladás	8,200
11	Salgótarján	6,267
12	SZEOL	5,053
13	Tatabánya Bányász	4,800
14	Győr	4,433
15	MTK	3,933
16	Csepel	3,547
