= Tibor Nyilasi =

Hungarian footballer and manager

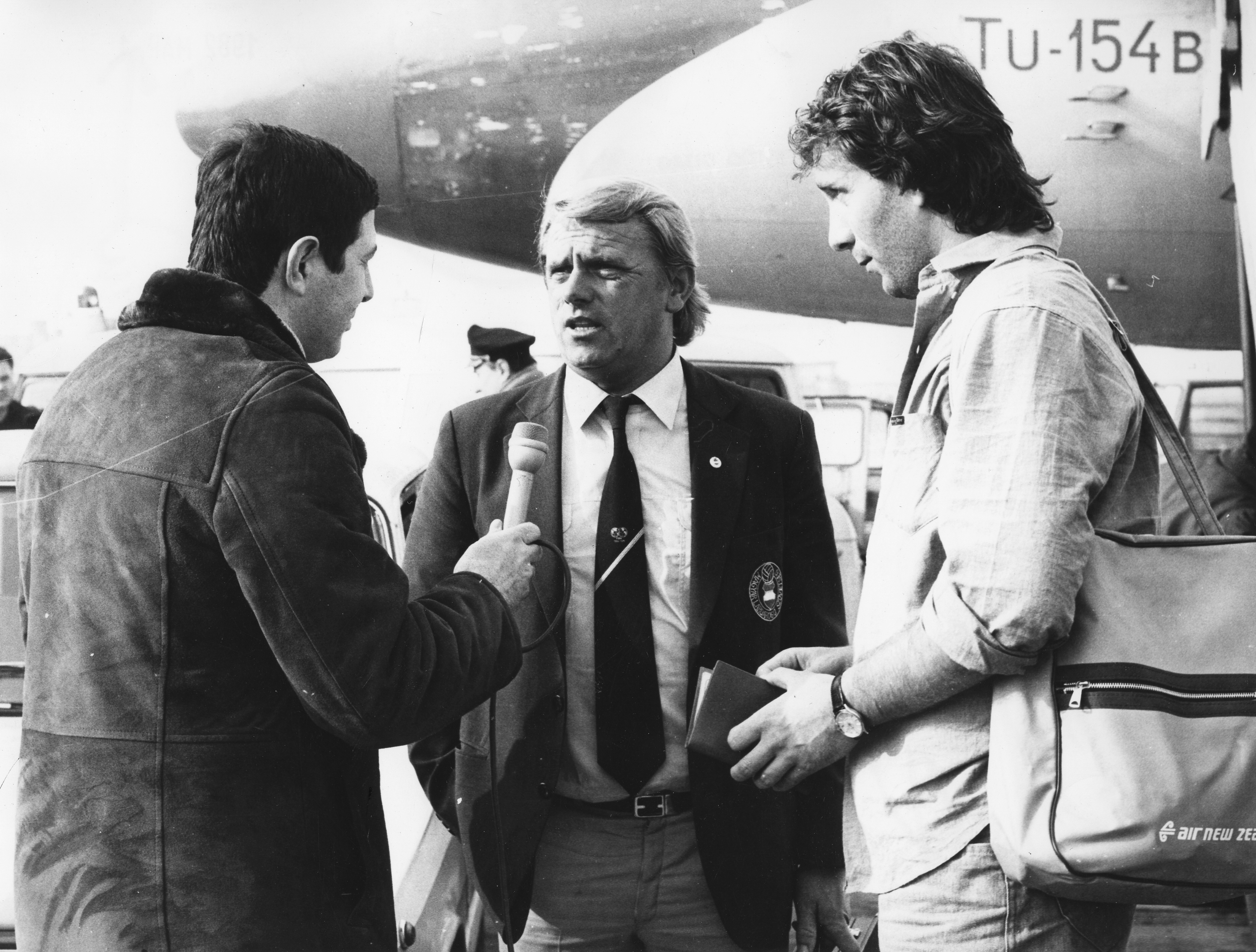
- Nyilasi (right) with TV reporter András Bánó and national team manager Kálmán Mészöly

Personal information
- Date of birth: 18 January 1955 (age 71)
- Place of birth: Várpalota, Hungary
- Height: 1.89 m (6 ft 2 in)
- Position: Midfielder

Youth career
- –1972: Úttörőstadion SC

Senior career*
Years	Team	Apps	(Gls)
1972–1983	Ferencváros	243	(132)
1983–1988	Austria Wien	120	(81)
Total		363	(213)

International career
1975–1985	Hungary	70	(32)

Managerial career
- 1990–1994: Ferencváros
- 1997–1999: Ferencváros
- 2014–2015: Hungary (assistant)
- * Club domestic league appearances and goals

Tibor Nyilasi (born 18 January 1955) is a Hungarian retired football player and manager. A midfielder, he signed with Ferencváros in 1972 and played there until transferring to Austria Wien in 1983. He made 70 appearances for the Hungary national team from 1975 to 1985, scoring 32 goals. He played in the 1978 FIFA World Cup (where he was sent off against Argentina) and the 1982 FIFA World Cup. After he retired as a player he was manager of Ferencváros. He has more recently also worked for the Hungarian Football Federation and is regularly appearing as a pundit on the Hungarian sports channel 'Sport TV'.

== Managerial career ==
Nyilasi managed Ferencváros twice. The first spell was between 6 June 1990 and 30 June 1994. During this period, Ferencváros played 128 matches. Ferencváros won 73 matches, drew only 25 matches, and lost 30 games. On 18 August 1990, he managed Ferencváros for the first time in a 5–0 victory over arch rivals Újpest. During his first spell, Péter Lipcsei became a solid player. Ferencváros won the 1991–92 Nemzeti Bajnokság I season and the 1990–91 Magyar Kupa, 1992–93 Magyar Kupa, and the 1993–94 Magyar Kupa seasons with Nyilasi.

His second spell started on 10 June 1997 and finished 17 December 1998.

== Personal life ==
In April 2025, he had a cardiac surgery in Budapest.

== Career statistics ==
Scores and results list Hungary's goal tally first, score column indicates score after each Nyilasi goal.

List of international goals scored by Tibor Nyilasi
No.	Date	Venue	Opponent	Score	Result	Competition	Ref.
1	24 September 1975	Népstadion, Budapest, Hungary	Austria	1-0	2-1	UEFA Euro 1976 qualification	
2	19 October 1975	Stadion Rohonci Út, Szombathely, Hungary	Luxembourg	2-0	8-1	UEFA Euro 1976 qualification	
3	19 October 1975	Stadion Rohonci Út, Szombathely, Hungary	Luxembourg	3-0	8-1	UEFA Euro 1976 qualification	
4	19 October 1975	Stadion Rohonci Út, Szombathely, Hungary	Luxembourg	4-0	8-1	UEFA Euro 1976 qualification	
5	19 October 1975	Stadion Rohonci Út, Szombathely, Hungary	Luxembourg	5-0	8-1	UEFA Euro 1976 qualification	
6	19 October 1975	Stadion Rohonci Út, Szombathely, Hungary	Luxembourg	6-0	8-1	UEFA Euro 1976 qualification	
7	27 March 1976	Népstadion, Budapest, Hungary	Argentina	1-0	2-0	Friendly	
8	13 October 1976	Praterstadion, Vienna, Austria	Austria	1-0	4-2	Friendly	
9	13 October 1976	Praterstadion, Vienna, Austria	Austria	2-0	4-2	Friendly	
10	15 March 1977	Amjadieh Stadium, Tehran, Iran	Iran	2-0	2-0	Friendly	
11	13 April 1977	Népstadion, Budapest, Hungary	Poland	1-0	2-1	Friendly	
12	13 April 1977	Népstadion, Budapest, Hungary	Poland	2-1	2-1	Friendly	
13	30 April 1977	Népstadion, Budapest, Hungary	Soviet Union	1-0	2-1	1978 FIFA World Cup qualification	
14	28 May 1977	Népstadion, Budapest, Hungary	Greece	2-0	3-0	1978 FIFA World Cup qualification	
15	12 October 1977	Népstadion, Budapest, Hungary	Sweden	1-0	3-0	Friendly	
16	29 October 1977	Népstadion, Budapest, Hungary	Bolivia	1-0	6-0	1978 FIFA World Cup qualification	
17	15 April 1978	Népstadion, Budapest, Hungary	Czechoslovakia	2-0	2-1	Friendly	
18	15 April 1981	Estadio Luis Casanova, Valencia, Spain	Spain	3-0	3-0	Friendly	
19	14 October 1981	Népstadion, Budapest, Hungary	Switzerland	1-0	3-0	1982 FIFA World Cup qualification	
20	14 October 1981	Népstadion, Budapest, Hungary	Switzerland	2-0	3-0	1982 FIFA World Cup qualification	
21	24 March 1982	Népstadion, Budapest, Hungary	Austria	2-3	2-3	Friendly	
22	15 June 1982	Nuevo Estadio, Elche, Spain	El Salvador	1-0	10-1	1982 FIFA World Cup	
23	15 June 1982	Nuevo Estadio, Elche, Spain	El Salvador	10-1	10-1	1982 FIFA World Cup	
24	27 March 1983	Stade Municipal, Luxembourg City, Luxembourg	Luxembourg	2-1	6-2	UEFA Euro 1984 qualification	
25	17 April 1983	Népstadion, Budapest, Hungary	Luxembourg	2-0	6-2	UEFA Euro 1984 qualification	
26	17 April 1983	Népstadion, Budapest, Hungary	Luxembourg	5-2	6-2	UEFA Euro 1984 qualification	
27	15 May 1983	Népstadion, Budapest, Hungary	Greece	1-1	2-3	UEFA Euro 1984 qualification	
28	1 June 1983	Idrætspark, Copenhagen, Denmark	Denmark	1-1	1-3	UEFA Euro 1984 qualification	
29	7 September 1983	Népstadion, Budapest, Hungary	West Germany	1-0	1-1	Friendly	
30	6 June 1984	King Baudouin Stadium, Brussels, Belgium	Belgium	2-1	2-2	Friendly	
31	17 November 1984	Tsirio Stadium, Limassol, Cyprus	Cyprus	2-1	2-1	1986 FIFA World Cup qualification	
32	3 April 1985	Népstadion, Budapest, Hungary	Cyprus	1-0	2-0	1986 FIFA World Cup qualification	

== Honours ==
=== Player ===
Ferencváros

- Nemzeti Bajnokság I: 1975–76, 1980–81,
- Hungarian Cup: 1973–74, 1975–76, 1977–78
- Cup Winners' Cup runner-up: 1974–75

Austria Wien

- Austrian Bundesliga: 1983–84, 1984–85, 1985–86
- Austrian Cup: 1985–86

Individual

- ADN Eastern European Footballer of the Season: 1978
- Hungarian Top Scorer: 1980–81
- European Silver Boot: 1980–81
- UEFA Cup Top Scorer: 1983–84
- Austrian Top Scorer: 1983–84

=== Manager ===
Ferencvárosi

- Nemzeti Bajnokság I: 1991–92
- Hungarian Cup: 1990–91, 1992–93, 1993–94

== Sources ==
- Ki kicsoda a magyar sportéletben?, II. kötet (I–R). Szekszárd, Babits Kiadó, 1995, p. 395., ISBN 963-495-011-6
- Nagy Béla: Fradisták (Sportpropaganda, 1981) ISBN 963-7542-44-2
- Nagy Béla: Fradi futballkönyv (Sportpropaganda, 1985) ISBN 963-7543-04-X
- Rejtő László–Lukács László–Szepesi György: Felejthetetlen 90 percek (Sportkiadó, 1977) ISBN 963-253-501-4
- Hoppe Pál – Szabó Ferenc: A Nyíl (Budapest, 1984)
- Nagy Béla: Nyilasi album (Budapest, 2003)
- His stats at Austria Wien
