= Tibor Rab =

Hungarian footballer

Personal information
- Date of birth: 2 October 1955 (age 71)
- Place of birth: Gödöllő, Hungary
- Position: Defender

Senior career*
Years	Team	Apps	(Gls)
1974–1986	Ferencváros		
1986–1988	Monori SE		

International career
1975–1982	Hungary	20	(0)
- * Club domestic league appearances and goals

Tibor Rab (born 2 October 1955) is a Hungarian former footballer who played at both professional and international levels as a defender.

== Career ==
Born in Gödöllő, Rab played club football for Ferencváros and Monori SE.

He also earned 20 caps for the Hungary national team between 1975 and 1982, representing them at the 1982 FIFA World Cup. He was also part of the Hungary squad for the 1978 FIFA World Cup, but did not play in the tournament.
