= UEFA Euro 1972 qualifying =

Tournament details
- Dates: 7 October 1970 – 17 May 1972
- Teams: 32

Tournament statistics
- Matches played: 105
- Goals scored: 282 (2.69 per match)
- Top scorer: (West Germany) Gerd Müller (7 goals)

The qualifying round for the 1972 European Football Championship consisted of 32 teams divided into eight groups of four teams. Each group winner progressed to the quarter-finals. The quarter-finals were played in two legs on a home-and-away basis. The winners of the quarter-finals would go through, to the final tournament.

== Qualified teams ==
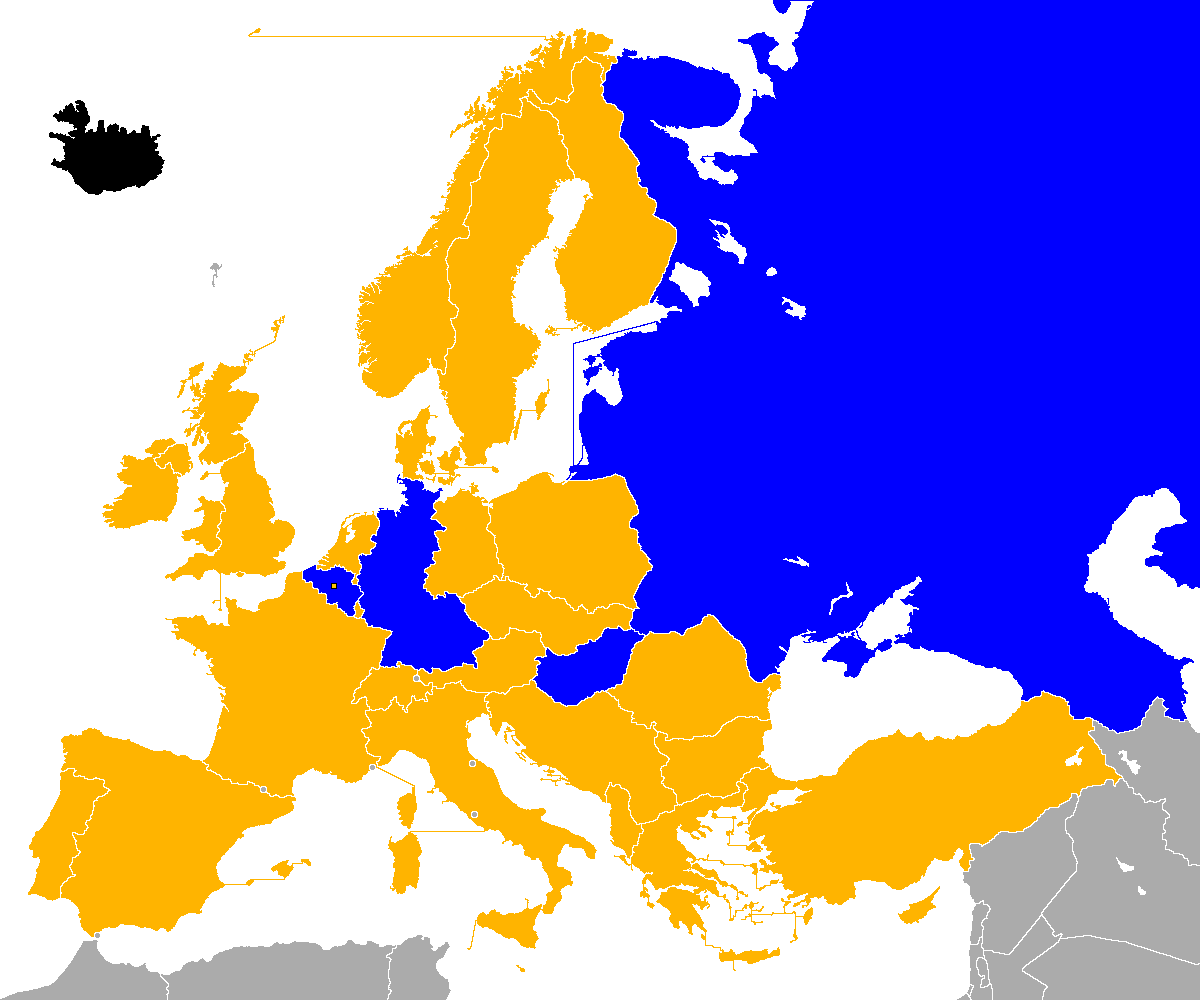
Qualified Did not qualify Did not enter Not a UEFA member

Team	Qualified as	Qualified on	Previous appearances in tournament (Note: Bold indicates champion for that year.)
Belgium (host)	Quarter-final winner	13 May 1972	0 (debut)
Soviet Union	Quarter-final winner	13 May 1972	3 (**1960**, 1964, 1968)
West Germany	Quarter-final winner	13 May 1972	0 (debut)
Hungary	Quarter-final winner	17 May 1972	1 (1964)

== Summary ==
Group winners advanced to the quarter-finals (second round)
Other teams were eliminated after the qualifying group stage

Group 1	Group 2	Group 3	Group 4	Group 5	Group 6	Group 7	Group 8
Romania	Hungary	England	Soviet Union	Belgium	Italy	Yugoslavia	West Germany
Czechoslovakia Wales Finland	Bulgaria France Norway	Switzerland Greece Malta	Spain Northern Ireland Cyprus	Portugal Scotland Denmark	Austria Sweden Republic of Ireland	Netherlands East Germany Luxembourg	Poland Turkey Albania

== Tiebreakers ==
If two or more teams finished level on points after completion of the group matches, the following tie-breakers were used to determine the final ranking:

1. Greater number of points in all group matches
2. Goal difference in all group matches
3. Greater number of goals scored in all group matches
4. Drawing of lots

== Groups ==
=== Group 1 ===
Pos	Team	Pld	W	D	L	GF	GA	GD	Pts	Qualification	(Romania)	(Czechoslovakia)	(Wales)	(Finland)
1	Romania	6	4	1	1	11	2	+9	**9**	Advance to quarter-finals	—	2–1	2–0	3–0
2	Czechoslovakia	6	4	1	1	11	4	+7	**9**		1–0	—	1–0	1–1
3	Wales	6	2	1	3	5	6	−1	**5**		0–0	1–3	—	3–0
4	Finland	6	0	1	5	1	16	−15	**1**		0–4	0–4	0–1	—

Source: UEFA

=== Group 2 ===
Pos	Team	Pld	W	D	L	GF	GA	GD	Pts	Qualification	(Hungary)	(Bulgaria)	(France)	(Norway)
1	Hungary	6	4	1	1	12	5	+7	**9**	Advance to quarter-finals	—	2–0	1–1	4–0
2	Bulgaria	6	3	1	2	11	7	+4	**7**		3–0	—	2–1	1–1
3	France	6	3	1	2	10	8	+2	**7**		0–2	2–1	—	3–1
4	Norway	6	0	1	5	5	18	−13	**1**		1–3	1–4	1–3	—

Source: UEFA

=== Group 3 ===
Pos	Team	Pld	W	D	L	GF	GA	GD	Pts	Qualification	(England)	(Switzerland)	(Greece)	(Malta)
1	England	6	5	1	0	15	3	+12	**11**	Advance to quarter-finals	—	1–1	3–0	5–0
2	Switzerland	6	4	1	1	12	5	+7	**9**		2–3	—	1–0	5–0
3	Greece	6	1	1	4	3	8	−5	**3**		0–2	0–1	—	2–0
4	Malta	6	0	1	5	2	16	−14	**1**		0–1	1–2	1–1	—

Source: UEFA

=== Group 4 ===
Pos	Team	Pld	W	D	L	GF	GA	GD	Pts	Qualification	(Soviet Union)	(Spain)	(Northern Ireland)	(Cyprus)
1	Soviet Union	6	4	2	0	13	4	+9	**10**	Advance to quarter-finals	—	2–1	1–0	6–1
2	Spain	6	3	2	1	14	3	+11	**8**		0–0	—	3–0	7–0
3	Northern Ireland	6	2	2	2	10	6	+4	**6**		1–1	1–1	—	5–0
4	Cyprus	6	0	0	6	2	26	−24	**0**		1–3	0–2	0–3	—

Source: UEFA

=== Group 5 ===
Pos	Team	Pld	W	D	L	GF	GA	GD	Pts	Qualification	(Belgium)	(Portugal)	(Scotland)	(Denmark)
1	Belgium	6	4	1	1	11	3	+8	**9**	Advance to quarter-finals	—	3–0	3–0	2–0
2	Portugal	6	3	1	2	10	6	+4	**7**		1–1	—	2–0	5–0
3	Scotland	6	3	0	3	4	7	−3	**6**		1–0	2–1	—	1–0
4	Denmark	6	1	0	5	2	11	−9	**2**		1–2	0–1	1–0	—

Source: UEFA

=== Group 6 ===
Pos	Team	Pld	W	D	L	GF	GA	GD	Pts	Qualification	(Italy)	(Austria)	(Sweden)	(Republic of Ireland)
1	Italy	6	4	2	0	12	4	+8	**10**	Advance to quarter-finals	—	2–2	3–0	3–0
2	Austria	6	3	1	2	14	6	+8	**7**		1–2	—	1–0	6–0
3	Sweden	6	2	2	2	3	5	−2	**6**		0–0	1–0	—	1–0
4	Republic of Ireland	6	0	1	5	3	17	−14	**1**		1–2	1–4	1–1	—

Source: UEFA

=== Group 7 ===
Pos	Team	Pld	W	D	L	GF	GA	GD	Pts	Qualification	(Socialist Federal Republic of Yugoslavia)	(Netherlands)	(East Germany)	(Luxembourg)
1	Yugoslavia	6	3	3	0	7	2	+5	**9**	Advance to quarter-finals	—	2–0	0–0	0–0
2	Netherlands	6	3	1	2	18	6	+12	**7**		1–1	—	3–2	6–0
3	East Germany	6	3	1	2	11	6	+5	**7**		1–2	1–0	—	2–1
4	Luxembourg	6	0	1	5	1	23	−22	**1**		0–2	0–8	0–5	—

Source: UEFA

=== Group 8 ===
Pos	Team	Pld	W	D	L	GF	GA	GD	Pts	Qualification	(West Germany)	(Poland)	(Turkey)	(Albania)
1	West Germany	6	4	2	0	10	2	+8	**10**	Advance to quarter-finals	—	0–0	1–1	2–0
2	Poland	6	2	2	2	10	6	+4	**6**		1–3	—	5–1	3–0
3	Turkey	6	2	1	3	5	13	−8	**5**		0–3	1–0	—	2–1
4	Albania	6	1	1	4	5	9	−4	**3**		0–1	1–1	3–0	—

Source: UEFA

== Quarter-finals ==
Team 1	Agg.	Team 2	1st leg	2nd leg	Replay
Italy	1–2	**Belgium**	0–0	1–2	
**Hungary**	5–4	Romania	1–1	2–2	2–1
England	1–3	**West Germany**	1–3	0–0	
Yugoslavia	0–3	**Soviet Union**	0–0	0–3	

== Goalscorers ==
There were 282 goals scored in 105 matches, for an average of 2.69 goals per match.

7 goals

- (Germany national football team) Gerd Müller

5 goals

- (East Germany national football team) Hans-Jürgen Kreische
- (England national football team) Martin Chivers
- (Netherlands national football team) Johan Cruyff
- (Netherlands national football team) Piet Keizer

4 goals

- (Austria national football team) Thomas Parits
- (Belgium national football team) Johan Devrindt
- (Czechoslovakia national football team) Ján Čapkovič
- (Hungary national football team) Ferenc Bene
- (Northern Ireland national football team) George Best
- (Poland national football team) Włodzimierz Lubański
- (Soviet Union national football team) Viktor Kolotov
- (Spain national football team) Pirri

3 goals

- (Austria national football team) Kurt Jara
- (Belgium national football team) Raoul Lambert
- (Belgium national football team) Paul Van Himst
- (Bulgaria national football team) Hristo Bonev
- (East Germany national football team) Eberhard Vogel
- (England national football team) Geoff Hurst
- (England national football team) Francis Lee
- (Hungary national football team) Lajos Kocsis
- (Italy national football team) Roberto Boninsegna
- (Italy national football team) Giancarlo De Sisti
- (Italy national football team) Pierino Prati
- (Italy national football team) Luigi Riva
- (Northern Ireland national football team) Jimmy Nicholson
- (Poland national football team) Robert Gadocha
- (Scotland national football team) John O'Hare
- (Soviet Union national football team) Gennady Yevryuzhikhin
- (Switzerland national football team) Fritz Künzli
- (Yugoslavia national football team) Dragan Džajić

2 goals

- (Albania national football team) Ilir Përnaska
- (Bulgaria national football team) Petar Zhekov
- (Czechoslovakia national football team) František Karkó
- (France national football team) Bernard Blanchet
- (France national football team) Georges Lech
- (France national football team) Charly Loubet
- (Hungary national football team) István Szőke
- (Netherlands national football team) Barry Hulshoff
- (Netherlands national football team) Rinus Israël
- (Northern Ireland national football team) Derek Dougan
- (Norway national football team) Odd Iversen
- (Portugal national football team) Vítor Baptista
- (Portugal national football team) Eusébio
- (Portugal national football team) Rui Rodrigues
- (Romania national football team) Emerich Dembrovschi
- (Romania national football team) Nicolae Dobrin
- (Romania national football team) Florea Dumitrache
- (Romania national football team) Mircea Lucescu
- (Romania national football team) Nicolae Lupescu
- (Romania national football team) Alexandru Neagu
- (Soviet Union national football team) Anatoliy Banishevskiy
- (Soviet Union national football team) Vladimir Fedotov
- (Soviet Union national football team) Vitaly Shevchenko
- (Spain national football team) Quino
- (Spain national football team) Carles Rexach
- (Spain national football team) José Francisco Rojo
- (Switzerland national football team) Kurt Müller
- (Switzerland national football team) Karl Odermatt
- (Switzerland national football team) René-Pierre Quentin
- (Turkey national football team) Cemil Turan
- (Wales national football team) John Toshack
- (Germany national football team) Jürgen Grabowski
- (Germany national football team) Günter Netzer
- (Yugoslavia national football team) Josip Bukal

1 goal

- (Albania national football team) Panajot Pano
- (Albania national football team) Medin Zhega
- (Albania national football team) Astrit Ziu
- (Austria national football team) Karl Kodat
- (Austria national football team) Hans Pirkner
- (Austria national football team) Robert Sara
- (Austria national football team) Hans Schmidradner
- (Austria national football team) August Starek
- (Austria national football team) Josef Stering
- (Belgium national football team) André De Nul
- (Belgium national football team) Wilfried Van Moer
- (Bulgaria national football team) Tsvetan Atanasov
- (Bulgaria national football team) Bozhil Kolev
- (Bulgaria national football team) Atanas Mihaylov
- (Bulgaria national football team) Petko Petkov
- (Bulgaria national football team) Mladen Vasilev
- (Bulgaria national football team) Stefan Velichkov
- (Cyprus national football team) Nikos Charalambous
- (Cyprus national football team) Stefanis Michael
- (Czechoslovakia national football team) Milan Albrecht
- (Czechoslovakia national football team) Ladislav Kuna
- (Czechoslovakia national football team) Jaroslav Pollák
- (Czechoslovakia national football team) Vladimír Táborský
- (Czechoslovakia national football team) František Veselý
- (Denmark national football team) Kresten Bjerre
- (Denmark national football team) Finn Laudrup
- (East Germany national football team) Peter Ducke
- (East Germany national football team) Henning Frenzel
- (East Germany national football team) Wolfram Löwe
- (England national football team) Allan Clarke
- (England national football team) Chris Lawler
- (England national football team) Martin Peters
- (England national football team) Mike Summerbee
- (Finland national football team) Matti Paatelainen
- (France national football team) Louis Floch
- (France national football team) Michel Mézy
- (France national football team) Hervé Revelli
- (France national football team) Jacques Vergnes
- (Greece national football team) Kostas Aidiniou
- (Greece national football team) Kostas Davourlis
- (Greece national football team) Michalis Kritikopoulos
- (Hungary national football team) László Branikovits
- (Hungary national football team) Antal Dunai
- (Hungary national football team) Péter Juhász
- (Hungary national football team) László Nagy
- (Hungary national football team) Lajos Szűcs
- (Hungary national football team) Csaba Vidáts
- (Italy national football team) Sandro Mazzola
- (Luxembourg national football team) Gilbert Dussier
- (Malta national football team) Eddie Theobald
- (Malta national football team) Willie Vassallo
- (Netherlands national football team) Oeki Hoekema
- (Netherlands national football team) Willi Lippens
- (Netherlands national football team) Theo Pahlplatz
- (Netherlands national football team) Wim Suurbier
- (Northern Ireland national football team) [[Sammy Morgan (footballer)|]]
- (Norway national football team) Ola Dybwad-Olsen
- (Norway national football team) Tor Fuglset
- (Norway national football team) Olav Nilsen
- (Poland national football team) Jan Banaś
- (Poland national football team) Bronisław Bula
- (Poland national football team) Zygfryd Szołtysik
- (Portugal national football team) Jacinto João
- (Portugal national football team) Fernando Peres
- (Republic of Ireland national football team) Tommy Carroll
- (Republic of Ireland national football team) Jimmy Conway
- (Republic of Ireland national football team) Eamonn Rogers
- (Romania national football team) Anghel Iordănescu
- (Romania national football team) Radu Nunweiller
- (Romania national football team) Lajos Sătmăreanu
- (Scotland national football team) Archie Gemmill
- (Soviet Union national football team) Anatoliy Byshovets
- (Soviet Union national football team) Eduard Kozynkevych
- (Soviet Union national football team) Vladimir Muntyan
- (Spain national football team) Francisco Aguilar
- (Spain national football team) Luis Aragonés
- (Spain national football team) Enrique Lora
- (Spain national football team) José Luis Violeta
- (Sweden men's national football team) Dan Brzokoupil
- (Sweden men's national football team) Jan Olsson
- (Sweden men's national football team) Tom Turesson
- (Switzerland national football team) Rolf Blättler
- (Switzerland national football team) Roland Citherlet
- (Switzerland national football team) Daniel Jeandupeux
- (Turkey national football team) Metin Kurt
- (Turkey national football team) Kamuran Yavuz
- (Turkey national football team) Nihat Yayöz
- (Wales national football team) Ron Davies
- (Wales national football team) Alan Durban
- (Wales national football team) Gil Reece
- (Germany national football team) Uli Hoeneß
- (Germany national football team) Horst Köppel
- (Yugoslavia national football team) Zoran Filipović
- (Yugoslavia national football team) Jurica Jerković

1 own goal

- (Denmark national football team) Erik Sandvad (against Portugal)
- (France national football team) Jacky Novi (against Hungary)
- (Norway national football team) Geir Karlsen (against Hungary)
- (Republic of Ireland national football team) Tony Dunne (against Austria)
- (Scotland national football team) Ronnie McKinnon (against Belgium)
- (Scotland national football team) Pat Stanton (against Portugal)
- (Switzerland national football team) Anton Weibel (against England)
