= UEFA Euro 1972 qualifying Group 2 =

Football tournament qualification stage

Group 2 of the UEFA Euro 1972 qualifying tournament was one of the eight groups to decide which teams would qualify for the UEFA Euro 1972 finals tournament. Group 2 consisted of four teams: Hungary, Bulgaria, France, and Norway, where they played against each other home-and-away in a round-robin format. The group winners were Hungary, who finished two points above Bulgaria and France.

== Final table ==
Pos	Team	Pld	W	D	L	GF	GA	GD	Pts	Qualification	(Hungary)	(Bulgaria)	(France)	(Norway)
1	Hungary	6	4	1	1	12	5	+7	9	Advance to quarter-finals	—	2–0	1–1	4–0
2	Bulgaria	6	3	1	2	11	7	+4	7		3–0	—	2–1	1–1
3	France	6	3	1	2	10	8	+2	7		0–2	2–1	—	3–1
4	Norway	6	0	1	5	5	18	−13	1		1–3	1–4	1–3	—

Source: UEFA
Rules for classification: Qualification tiebreakers

== Matches ==
7 October 1970
19:00

Norway	1–3	Hungary
Iversen 50'	Report	Bene 6'; Nagy 23'; Karlsen 69' (o.g.)

Ullevaal, Oslo
Attendance: 16,090
Referee: Adrianus Boogaerts (Netherlands)

11 November 1970
17:00

France	3–1	Norway
Floch 30'; Lech 55'; Mézy 63'	Report	Nilsen 79'

Stade de Gerland, Lyon
Attendance: 10,357
Referee: António Ribeiro Saldanha (Portugal)

15 November 1970
15:30

Bulgaria	1–1	Norway
Atanasov 29'	Report	Fuglset 83'

Vasil Levski Stadium, Sofia
Attendance: 21,465
Referee: Michalakis Kiriakides (Cyprus)

24 April 1971
16:30

Hungary	1–1	France
Kocsis 70' (pen.)	Report	Revelli 64'

Népstadion, Budapest
Attendance: 45,867
Referee: Joaquim Fernandes dos Campos (Portugal)

19 May 1971
18:30

Bulgaria	3–0	Hungary
Kolev 38'; Petkov 48'; Velichkov 72'	Report

Vasil Levski Stadium, Sofia
Attendance: 28,342
Referee: Tofik Bakhramov (USSR)

9 June 1971
19:00

Norway	1–4	Bulgaria
Iversen 80'	Report	Bonev 26', 42' (pen.); Zhekov 29'; M. Vasilev 37'

Ullevaal, Oslo
Attendance: 22,041
Referee: William Gow (Wales)

8 September 1971
19:00

Norway	1–3	France
Dybwad-Olsen 80'	Report	Vergnes 33'; Blanchet 34'; Loubet 46'

Ullevaal, Oslo
Attendance: 16,544
Referee: John Wright Paterson (Scotland)

25 September 1971
17:30

Hungary	2–0	Bulgaria
Juhász 51'; Vidáts 52'	Report

Népstadion, Budapest
Attendance: 67,740
Referee: Robert Holley Davidson (Scotland)

9 October 1971
15:00

France	0–2	Hungary
	Report	Bene 35'; Novi 43' (o.g.)

Stade Olympique, Colombes(Paris)
Attendance: 21,756
Referee: Gaspar Pintado Viu (Spain)

27 October 1971
17:30

Hungary	4–0	Norway
Bene 22', 43'; Dunai 24'; Szűcs 63'	Report

Népstadion, Budapest
Attendance: 29,253
Referee: Doğan Babacan (Turkey)

10 November 1971
20:30

France	2–1	Bulgaria
Lech 64'; Loubet 84'	Report	Bonev 54' (pen.)

Stade Marcel Saupin, Nantes
Attendance: 9,405
Referee: Jack Taylor (England)

4 December 1971
14:30

Bulgaria	2–1	France
Zhekov 47'; Mihaylov 82'	Report	Blanchet 84'

Vasil Levski Stadium, Sofia
Attendance: 18,057
Referee: Kurt Tschenscher (West Germany)

== Goalscorers ==
There were 38 goals scored in 12 matches, for an average of 3.17 goals per match.

4 goals

- (Hungary national football team) Ferenc Bene

3 goals

- (Bulgaria national football team) Hristo Bonev

2 goals

- (Bulgaria national football team) Petar Zhekov
- (France national football team) Bernard Blanchet
- (France national football team) Georges Lech
- (France national football team) Charly Loubet
- (Norway national football team) Odd Iversen

1 goal

- (Bulgaria national football team) Tsvetan Atanasov
- (Bulgaria national football team) Bozhil Kolev
- (Bulgaria national football team) Atanas Mihaylov
- (Bulgaria national football team) Petko Petkov
- (Bulgaria national football team) Mladen Vasilev
- (Bulgaria national football team) Stefan Velichkov
- (France national football team) Louis Floch
- (France national football team) Michel Mézy
- (France national football team) Hervé Revelli
- (France national football team) Jacques Vergnes
- (Hungary national football team) Antal Dunai
- (Hungary national football team) Péter Juhász
- (Hungary national football team) Lajos Kocsis
- (Hungary national football team) László Nagy
- (Hungary national football team) Lajos Szűcs
- (Hungary national football team) Csaba Vidáts
- (Norway national football team) Ola Dybwad-Olsen
- (Norway national football team) Tor Fuglset
- (Norway national football team) Olav Nilsen

1 own goal

- (France national football team) Jacky Novi (against Hungary)
- (Norway national football team) Geir Karlsen (against Hungary)
