= UEFA Euro 1972 qualifying Group 3 =

Football tournament qualification stage

Group 3 of the UEFA Euro 1972 qualifying tournament was one of the eight groups to decide which teams would qualify for the UEFA Euro 1972 finals tournament. Group 3 consisted of four teams: England, Switzerland, Greece, and Malta, where they played against each other home-and-away in a round-robin format. The group winners were England, who finished two points above Switzerland.

== Final table ==
Pos	Team	Pld	W	D	L	GF	GA	GD	Pts	Qualification	(England)	(Switzerland)	(Greece)	(Malta)
1	England	6	5	1	0	15	3	+12	11	Advance to quarter-finals	—	1–1	3–0	5–0
2	Switzerland	6	4	1	1	12	5	+7	9		2–3	—	1–0	5–0
3	Greece	6	1	1	4	3	8	−5	3		0–2	0–1	—	2–0
4	Malta	6	0	1	5	2	16	−14	1		0–1	1–2	1–1	—

Source: UEFA
Rules for classification: Qualification tiebreakers

== Matches ==
11 October 1970
15:00

Malta	1–1	Greece
Vassallo 66'	Report	Kritikopoulos 80'

Empire Stadium, Gżira
Attendance: 8,689
Referee: Concetto Lo Bello (Italy)

16 December 1970
14:45

Greece	0–1	Switzerland
	Report	Müller 85'

Stadio Karaiskaki, Piraeus(Athens)
Attendance: 30,699
Referee: Milivoje Gugulović (Yugoslavia)

20 December 1970
14:30

Malta	1–2	Switzerland
Theobald 55' (pen.)	Report	Quentin 49'; Künzli 57'

Empire Stadium, Gżira
Attendance: 4,739
Referee: Gocho Rusev (Bulgaria)

3 February 1971
15:00

Malta	0–1	England
	Report	Peters 35'

Empire Stadium, Gżira
Attendance: 29,751
Referee: Ferdinand Marschall (Austria)

21 April 1971
19:45

Switzerland	5–0	Malta
Blättler 14'; Künzli 17'; Quentin 26'; Citherlet 28'; Müller 30'	Report

Allmend Stadion, Lucerne
Attendance: 16,470
Referee: Gunnar Michaelsen (Denmark)

21 April 1971
19:30

England	3–0	Greece
Chivers 23'; Hurst 68'; Lee 87'	Report

Wembley Stadium, London
Attendance: 55,123
Referee: Martti Hirviniemi (Finland)

12 May 1971
20:00

Switzerland	1–0	Greece
Odermatt 73'	Report

Wankdorf Stadion, Bern
Attendance: 32,770
Referee: Iorwerth Jones (Wales) /injured 29'/ from 29' Thomas Henry Reynolds (Wales)

12 May 1971
19:45

England	5–0	Malta
Chivers 1', 47'; Lee 41'; Clarke 46' (pen.); Lawler 74'	Report

Wembley Stadium, London
Attendance: 41,534
Referee: Einar Røed (Norway)

18 June 1971
21:00

Greece	2–0	Malta
Davourlis 60'; Aidiniou 80'	Report

Stadio Karaiskaki, Piraeus(Athens)
Attendance: 9,561
Referee: István Zsolt (Hungary)

13 October 1971
20:00

Switzerland	2–3	England
Jeandupeux 10'; Künzli 44'	Report	Hurst 1'; Chivers 12'; Weibel 77' (o.g.)

St. Jakob Stadium, Basel
Attendance: 47,877
Referee: Vital Loraux (Belgium)

10 November 1971
19:45

England	1–1	Switzerland
Summerbee 9'	Report	Odermatt 26'

Wembley Stadium, London
Attendance: 90,423
Referee: Constantin Bărbulescu (Romania)

1 December 1971
14:45

Greece	0–2	England
	Report	Hurst 59'; Chivers 90'

Stadio Karaiskaki, Piraeus(Athens)
Attendance: 34,014
Referee: José María Ortiz de Mendíbil (Spain)

== Goalscorers ==
There were 32 goals scored in 12 matches, for an average of 2.67 goals per match.

5 goals

- (England) Martin Chivers

3 goals

- (England) Geoff Hurst
- (Switzerland) Fritz Künzli

2 goals

- (England) Francis Lee
- (Switzerland) Kurt Müller
- (Switzerland) Karl Odermatt
- (Switzerland) René-Pierre Quentin

1 goal

- (England) Allan Clarke
- (England) Chris Lawler
- (England) Martin Peters
- (England) Mike Summerbee
- (Greece) Kostas Aidiniou
- (Greece) Kostas Davourlis
- (Greece) Michalis Kritikopoulos
- (Malta) Eddie Theobald
- (Malta) Willie Vassallo
- (Switzerland) Rolf Blättler
- (Switzerland) Roland Citherlet
- (Switzerland) Daniel Jeandupeux

1 own goal

- (Switzerland) Anton Weibel (against England)
