= West Germany national football team results =

This is a list of international football matches of the Germany national football team during its period as West Germany from 1950 until 1990.

Following the end of World War II, Germany was partitioned into rival West and East zones, each with their own football systems. With the general turmoil of the period, the slow initial economic recovery, five-year suspension by FIFA due to the country having caused World War II (during until 1950), and Hungary's is the overwhelming favorite, boasting its best team in their history, it was a surprise to many when West Germany won the 1954 FIFA World Cup in neighbouring Switzerland, in the so-called "Miracle of Bern". It was in the mid-1960s when German football became strong, with the backbone of the national squad formed by an exceptional group of young players at FC Bayern Munich, soon augmented further by another strong team at Borussia Monchengladbach and others from the leading clubs. After reaching the 1966 FIFA World Cup Final, they built on victory in UEFA Euro 1972 by winning the 1974 FIFA World Cup on home soil. A further Euro win in 1980 (after an unexpected loss in the 1976 final), plus further World Cup final appearances in 1982 and 1986 confirmed their status as one of the world's most consistently powerful teams. With the end of the Cold War and reunification of the country approaching at the end of the 1980s, the final achievement of West Germany was winning the 1990 FIFA World Cup.

== List of matches ==
Nr.	Date	Result	Opponent		Venue	Competition	Attendance	Notes
199	22 November 1950	1–0 (HT 1–0)	Switzerland	H	Stuttgart, Neckarstadion		102,000	(Note: First match after World War II.)
200	15 April 1951	3–2 (HT 1–1)	Switzerland	A	Zurich (SUI), Hardturm		34,000	
201	17 June 1951	1–2 (HT 0–1)	Turkey	H	Berlin, Olympiastadion		90,000	(Note: First match against Turkey.)
202	23 September 1951	2–0 (HT 1–0)	Austria	A	Vienna (AUT), Praterstadion		65,000	
203	17 October 1951	2–3 (HT 0–2)	Republic of Ireland	A	Dublin (IRL), Dalymount Park		29,451	
204	21 November 1951	2–0 (HT 0–0)	Turkey	A	Istanbul (TUR), İnönü Stadı		30,000	
205	23 December 1951	4–1 (HT 1–0)	Luxembourg	H	Essen, Uhlenkrugstadion		40,000	
206	20 April 1952	3–0 (HT 1–0)	Luxembourg	A	Luxembourg (LUX), Stade Municipal		17,000	
207	4 May 1952	3–0 (HT 1–0)	Republic of Ireland	H	Cologne, Müngersdorfer Stadion		75,000	
208	5 October 1952	1–3 (HT 1–1)	France	A	Colombes (FRA), Yves-du-Manoir-Stadion		56,021	
209	9 November 1952	5–1 (HT 2–0)	Switzerland	H	Augsburg, Rosenaustadion		64,000	
210	21 December 1952	3–2 (HT 2–2)	Yugoslavia	H	Ludwigshafen, Südweststadion		70,000	
211	28 December 1952	2–2 (HT 2–1)	Spain	A	Madrid (ESP), Nuevo Estadio Chamartín		80,000	
212	22 March 1953	0–0	Austria	H	Cologne, Müngersdorfer Stadion		76,000	
213	19 August 1953	1–1 (HT 1–1)	Norway	A	Oslo (NOR), Ullevaal Stadion	WC 1954 Qualification	32,266	
214	11 October 1953	3–0 (HT 1–0)	Saar	H	Stuttgart, Neckarstadion	WC 1954 Qualification	53,000	(Note: First match and biggest win against Saarland.)
215	22 November 1953	5–1 (HT 1–1)	Norway	H	Hamburg, Volksparkstadion	WC 1954 Qualification	76,000	
216	28 March 1954	3–1 (HT 1–0)	Saar	A	Saarbrücken (SAR), Ludwigsparkstadion	WC 1954 Qualification	53,000	(Note: Last match against Saarland.)
217	25 April 1954	5–3 (HT 4–0)	Switzerland	A	Basel (SUI), St. Jakob Stadium		51,864	
218	17 June 1954	4–1 (HT 1–1)	Turkey	N	Bern (SUI), Wankdorf Stadium	WC 1954 Group	39,000	
219	20 June 1954	3–8 (HT 1–3)	Hungary	N	Basel (SUI), St. Jakob Stadium	WC 1954 Group	65,000	(Note: Biggest defeat against Hungary; biggest defeat at a World Cup finals match.) (Note: Biggest defeat at neutral venue.)
220	23 June 1954	7–2 (HT 3–1)	Turkey	N	Zurich (SUI), Hardturm	WC 1954 Group	18,000	(Note: Biggest win against Turkey.)
221	27 June 1954	2–0 (HT 1–0)	Yugoslavia	N	Geneva (SUI), Stade des Charmilles	WC 1954 Quarter final	20,000	
222	30 June 1954	6–1 (HT 1–0)	Austria	N	Basel (SUI), St. Jakob Stadium	WC 1954 Semi final	58,000	(Note: Biggest win against Austria.)
223	4 July 1954	3–2 (HT 2–2)	Hungary	N	Bern (SUI), Wankdorf Stadium	WC 1954 Final	62,471	(Note: First World Cup title.)
224	26 September 1954	0–2 (HT 0–1)	Belgium	A	Brussels (BEL), Heysel Stadion		55,116	
225	16 October 1954	1–3 (HT 0–2)	France	H	Hanover, Niedersachsenstadion		86,000	
226	1 December 1954	1–3 (HT 0–1)	England	A	London (ENG), Wembley Stadium		100,000	
227	19 December 1954	3–0 (HT 1–0)	Portugal	A	Oeiras (POR), Estádio Nacional		70,000	
228	30 March 1955	1–2 (HT 1–2)	Italy	H	Stuttgart, Neckarstadion		82,000	
229	28 May 1955	2–1 (HT 1–0)	Republic of Ireland	H	Hamburg, Volksparkstadion		50,000	
230	21 August 1955	2–3 (HT 1–1)	Soviet Union	A	Moscow (URS), Central Dynamo Stadium		54,000	(Note: First match against Soviet Union.)
231	25 September 1955	1–3 (HT 0–2)	Yugoslavia	A	Belgrade (YUG), Armee-Stadion		55,000	(Note: Biggest defeat against Yugoslavia.)
232	16 November 1955	2–0 (HT 2–0)	Norway	H	Karlsruhe, Wildparkstadion		49,700	
233	18 December 1955	1–2 (HT 0–1)	Italy	A	Rome (ITA), Stadio dei Centomila		80,000	
234	14 March 1956	1–2 (HT 0–0)	Netherlands	H	Düsseldorf, Rheinstadion		65,000	
235	26 May 1956	1–3 (HT 0–1)	England	H	Berlin, Olympiastadion		95,000	
236	13 June 1956	3–1 (HT 1–1)	Norway	A	Oslo (NOR), Ullevaal Stadion		27,708	
237	30 June 1956	2–2 (HT 0–2)	Sweden	A	Solna (SWE), Råsundastadion		30,700	
238	15 September 1956	1–2 (HT 1–2)	Soviet Union	H	Hanover, Niedersachsenstadion		86,000	
239	21 November 1956	1–3 (HT 1–2)	Switzerland	H	Frankfurt, Waldstadion		80,000	
240	25 November 1956	0–3 (HT 0–0)	Republic of Ireland	A	Dublin (IRL), Dalymount Park		40,000	
241	23 December 1956	4–1 (HT 2–1)	Belgium	H	Cologne, Müngersdorfer Stadion		67,000	
242	10 March 1957	3–2 (HT 2–0)	Austria	A	Vienna (AUT), Praterstadion		65,000	
243	3 April 1957	2–1 (HT 1–0)	Netherlands	A	Amsterdam (NED), Olympic Stadium		60,000	
244	22 May 1957	1–3 (HT 0–2)	Scotland	H	Stuttgart, Neckarstadion		80,000	(Note: Biggest defeat against Scotland.)
245	20 November 1957	1–0 (HT 1–0)	Sweden	H	Hamburg, Volksparkstadion		76,000	
246	22 December 1957	1–0 (HT 1–0)	Hungary	H	Hanover, Niedersachsenstadion		85,000	
247	2 March 1958	2–0 (HT 1–0)	Belgium	A	Brussels (BEL), Heysel Stadion		55,970	
248	19 March 1958	2–0 (HT 1–0)	Spain	H	Frankfurt, Waldstadion		81,000	
249	2 April 1958	2–3 (HT 1–1)	Czechoslovakia	A	Prague (CZS), Armee-Stadion		50,000	
250	8 June 1958	3–1 (HT 2–1)	Argentina	N	Malmö (SWE), Stadion Malmö	WC 1958 Group	32,000	(Note: First match against Argentina; first win against non-european team.)
251	11 June 1958	2–2 (HT 0–2)	Czechoslovakia	N	Helsingborg (SWE), Olympia	WC 1958 Group	25,000	
252	15 June 1958	2–2 (HT 1–1)	Northern Ireland	N	Malmö (SWE), Stadion Malmö	WC 1958 Group	35,000	(Note: First match against Northern Ireland.)
253	19 June 1958	1–0 (HT 1–0)	Yugoslavia	N	Malmö (SWE), Stadion Malmö	WC 1958 Quarter final	20,000	
254	24 June 1958	1–3 (HT 1–1)	Sweden	A	Gothenburg (SWE), Ullevi-Stadion	WC 1958 Semi final	49,471	
255	28 June 1958	3–6 (HT 1–3)	France	N	Gothenburg (SWE), Ullevi-Stadion	WC 1958 3rd place	25,000	(Note: Biggest defeat against France.)
256	24 September 1958	1–1 (HT 1–0)	Denmark	A	Copenhagen (DEN), Københavns Idrætspark		34,000	(Note: First match under floodlights.)
257	26 October 1958	2–2 (HT 1–1)	France	A	Colombes (FRA), Yves-du-Manoir-Stadion		50,922	
258	19 November 1958	2–2 (HT 1–1)	Austria	H	Berlin, Olympiastadion		85,000	
259	21 December 1958	3–0 (HT 1–0)	Bulgaria	H	Augsburg, Rosenaustadion		60,000	
260	28 December 1958	1–2 (HT 1–1)	Egypt (United Arab Republic)	A	Cairo (EGY), Muhammad Ali Stadium		30,000	(Note: First match against Egypt; first match and also first defeat against an African team; first match outside Europe; first match in Africa.)
261	6 May 1959	2–3 (HT 2–3)	Scotland	A	Glasgow (SCO), Hampden Park		103,415	
262	20 May 1959	1–1 (HT 0–1)	Poland	H	Hamburg, Volksparkstadion		61,000	
263	4 October 1959	4–0 (HT 1–0)	Switzerland	A	Bern (SUI), Wankdorf Stadium		49,000	
264	21 October 1959	7–0 (HT 2–0)	Netherlands	H	Cologne, Müngersdorfer Stadion		45,000	(Note: Biggest win against Netherlands.)
265	8 November 1959	3–4 (HT 0–1)	Hungary	A	Budapest (HUN), Népstadion		90,000	
266	20 December 1959	1–1 (HT 0–1)	Yugoslavia	H	Hanover, Niedersachsenstadion		83,000	
267	23 March 1960	2–1 (HT 0–1)	Chile	H	Stuttgart, Neckarstadion		77,370	(Note: First match against Chile.)
268	27 April 1960	2–1 (HT 1;0)	Portugal	H	Ludwigshafen, Südweststadion		45,000	
269	11 May 1960	0–1 (HT 0–1)	Republic of Ireland	H	Düsseldorf, Rheinstadion		51,000	
270	3 August 1960	5–0 (HT 2–0)	Iceland	A	Reykjavík (ISL), Laugardalsvöllur		7,485	(Note: First match and also biggest win against Iceland.)
271	26 October 1960	4–3 (HT 1–1)	Northern Ireland	A	Belfast (NIR), Windsor Park	WC 1962 Qualification	35,000	
272	20 November 1960	3–0 (HT 3–0)	Greece	A	Athen (GRE), Leoforos Alexandras Stadium	WC 1962 Qualification	25,000	(Note: First match and also biggest win against Greece.)
273	23 November 1960	1–2 (HT 1–0)	Bulgaria	A	Sofia (BUL), Vasil Levski National Stadium		45,000	
274	8 March 1961	1–0 (HT 1–0)	Belgium	H	Frankfurt, Waldstadion		65,000	
275	26 March 1961	1–3 (HT 1–2)	Chile	A	Santiago (CHI), Nationalstadion		60,000	(Note: First match in South America; first match in southern hemisphere; biggest defeat against Chile.)
276	10 May 1961	2–1 (HT 1–0)	Northern Ireland	H	Berlin, Olympiastadion	WC 1962 Qualification	94,600	
277	20 September 1961	5–1 (HT 3–0)	Denmark	H	Düsseldorf, Rheinstadion		45,000	
278	8 October 1961	2–0 (HT 1–0)	Poland	A	Warsaw (POL), Armee-Stadion		25,000	
279	22 October 1961	2–1 (HT 2–0)	Greece	H	Augsburg, Rosenaustadion	WC 1962 Qualification	43,000	
280	11 April 1962	3–0 (HT 1–0)	Uruguay	H	Hamburg, Volksparkstadion		71,000	
281	31 May 1962	0–0	Italy	N	Santiago (CHI), Nationalstadion	WC 1962 Group	65,440	
282	3 June 1962	2–1 (HT 1–0)	Switzerland	N	Santiago (CHI), Nationalstadion	WC 1962 Group	64,922	
283	6 June 1962	2–0 (HT 1–0)	Chile	A	Santiago (CHI), Nationalstadion	WC 1962 Group	67,224	
284	10 June 1962	0–1 (HT 0–0)	Yugoslavia	N	Santiago (CHI), Nationalstadion	WC 1962 Quarter final	63,324	
285	30 September 1962	3–2 (HT 2–1)	Yugoslavia	A	Zagreb (YUG), Maksimir-Stadion		50,000	
286	24 October 1962	2–2 (HT 0–2)	France	H	Stuttgart, Neckarstadion		75,000	
287	23 December 1962	5–1 (HT 2–1)	Switzerland	H	Karlsruhe, Wildparkstadion		48,000	
288	5 May 1963	1–2 (HT 1–0)	Brazil	H	Hamburg, Volksparkstadion		71,000	(Note: First match against Brazil.)
289	28 September 1963	3–0 (HT 0–0)	Turkey	H	Frankfurt, Waldstadion		47,000	
290	3 November 1963	1–2 (HT 0–0)	Sweden	A	Solna (SWE), Råsundastadion		10,192	
291	29 December 1963	4–1 (HT 2–1)	Morocco	A	Casablanca (MAR), Stade d`Honneur		15,000	(Note: First match against Morocco.)
292	1 January 1964	0–2 (HT 0–2)	Algeria	A	Algiers (ALG), Stadion des 20. August 1955		17,000	(Note: First match against Algeria also biggest defeat against Algeria.)
293	29 April 1964	3–4 (HT 1–3)	Czechoslovakia	H	Ludwigshafen, Südweststadion		65,000	
294	12 May 1964	2–2 (HT 2–0)	Scotland	H	Hanover, Niedersachsenstadion		65,000	
295	7 June 1964	4–1 (HT 3–1)	Finland	A	Helsinki (FIN), Helsinki Olympic Stadium		11,056	(Note: 167th and last match under Sepp Herberger.)
296	4 November 1964	1–1 (HT 1–0)	Sweden	H	Berlin, Olympiastadion	WC 1966 Qualification	70,229	(Note: First match under coach Helmut Schön.)
297	13 March 1965	1–1 (HT 1–0)	Italy	H	Hamburg, Volksparkstadion		70,000	
298	24 April 1965	5–0 (HT 3–0)	Cyprus	H	Karlsruhe, Wildparkstadion	WC 1966 Qualification	39,675	(Note: First match against Cyprus.)
299	12 May 1965	0–1 (HT 0–1)	England	H	Nuremberg, Städtisches Stadion		65,000	
300	26 May 1965	1–0 (HT 1–0)	Switzerland	A	Basel (SUI), St. Jakob Stadium		40,001	
301	6 June 1965	0–2 (HT 0–1)	Brazil	A	Rio de Janeiro (BRA), Maracanã-Stadion		143,315	
302	26 September 1965	2–1 (HT 1–1)	Sweden	A	Solna (SWE), Råsundastadion	WC 1966 Qualification	52,943	
303	9 October 1965	4–1 (HT 1–1)	Austria	H	Stuttgart, Neckarstadion		74,000	
304	14 November 1965	6–0 (HT 2–0)	Cyprus	A	Nicosia (CYP), GSP-Stadion	WC 1966 Qualification	3,412	
305	23 February 1966	0–1 (HT 0–1)	England	A	London (ENG), Wembley Stadium		75,000	
306	23 March 1966	4–2 (HT 3–1)	Netherlands	A	Rotterdam (NED), De Kuip		63,000	
307	4 May 1966	4–0 (HT 2–0)	Republic of Ireland	A	Dublin (IRL), Dalymount Park		16,091	
308	7 May 1966	2–0 (HT 1–0)	Northern Ireland	A	Belfast (NIR), Windsor Park		22,000	
309	1 June 1966	1–0 (HT 0–0)	Romania	H	Ludwigshafen, Südweststadion		60,000	
310	23 June 1966	2–0 (HT 1–0)	Yugoslavia	H	Hanover, Niedersachsenstadion		75,000	
311	12 July 1966	5–0 (HT 3–0)	Switzerland	N	Sheffield (ENG), Hillsborough	WC 1966 Group	36,127	
312	16 July 1966	0–0	Argentina	N	Birmingham (ENG), Villa Park	WC 1966 Group	46,587	
313	20 July 1966	2–1 (HT 1–1)	Spain	N	Birmingham (ENG), Villa Park	WC 1966 Group	42,187	(Note: First Yellow card to an opposition player - Jesus Glaria.)
314	23 July 1966	4–0 (HT 1–0)	Uruguay	N	Sheffield (ENG), Hillsborough	WC 1966 Quarter final	35,000	
315	25 July 1966	2–1 (HT 1–0)	Soviet Union	N	Liverpool (ENG), Goodison Park	WC 1966 Semi final	38,273	(Note: First Yellow card to a German player - Franz Beckenbauer.)
316	30 July 1966	2–4 a.e.t (HT 1–1, FT 2–2)	England	A	London (ENG), Wembley Stadium	WC 1966 Final	96,924	
317	12 October 1966	2–0 (HT 1–0)	Turkey	A	Ankara (TUR), Ankara 19 Mayıs Stadium		23,944	(Note: First match in Asia.)
318	19 November 1966	3–0 (HT 2–0)	Norway	H	Cologne, Müngersdorfer Stadion		38,000	
319	22 February 1967	5–1 (HT 2–0)	Morocco	H	Karlsruhe, Wildparkstadion		33,000	(Note: Biggest win against Morocco.)
320	22 March 1967	1–0 (HT 0–0)	Bulgaria	H	Hanover, Niedersachsenstadion		68,000	
321	8 April 1967	6–0 (HT 2–0)	Albania	H	Dortmund, Stadion Rote Erde	EC 1968 Qualification	30,000	(Note: First match against Albania.)
322	3 May 1967	0–1 (HT 0–0)	Yugoslavia	A	Belgrade (YUG), Stadion Roter Stern	EC 1968 Qualification	36,508	
323	27 September 1967	5–1 (HT 1–0)	France	H	Berlin, Olympiastadion		80,000	(Note: Biggest win against France.)
324	7 October 1967	3–1 (HT 1–0)	Yugoslavia	H	Hamburg, Volksparkstadion	EC 1968 Qualification	70,575	
325	22 November 1967	0–1 (HT 0–0)	Romania	A	Bucharest (ROM), Arena Națională		35,000	(Note: 100th defeat for Germany.)
326	17 December 1967	0–0	Albania	A	Tirana (ALB), Qemal Stafa Stadium	EC 1968 Qualification	21,889	(Note: Only failure in qualifying for a finals tournament.)
327	6 March 1968	3–1 (HT 3–0)	Belgium	A	Brussels (BEL), Heysel Stadion		10,267	
328	17 April 1968	0–0	Switzerland	A	Basel (SUI), St. Jakob Stadium		55,000	
329	8 May 1968	1–1 (HT 1–1)	Wales	A	Cardiff (WAL), Ninian Park		8,075	(Note: First match against Wales.)
330	1 June 1968	1–0 (HT 0–0)	England	H	Hanover, Niedersachsenstadion		79,124	
331	16 June 1968	2–1 (HT 1–0)	Brazil	H	Stuttgart, Neckarstadion		74,164	
332	25 September 1968	1–1 (HT 0–0)	France	A	Marseille (FRA), Stade Vélodrome		22,355	
333	13 October 1968	2–0 (HT 1–0)	Austria	A	Vienna (AUT), Praterstadion	WC 1970 Qualification	70,000	
334	23 November 1968	1–0 (HT 0–0)	Cyprus	A	Nicosia (CYP), GSP Stadium	WC 1970 Qualification	6,080	
335	14 December 1968	2–2 (HT 0–2)	Brazil	A	Rio de Janeiro (BRA), Maracanã-Stadion		70,000	
336	18 December 1968	1–2 (HT 1–0)	Chile	A	Santiago (CHI), Nationalstadion		50,000	(Note: Referee from Chilean federation.)
337	22 December 1968	0–0	Mexico	A	Mexico City (MEX), Estadio Azteca		40,000	(Note: First match against Mexico; first match in North or Central America.)
338	26 March 1969	1–1 (HT 0–1)	Wales	H	Frankfurt, Waldstadion		40,000	
339	16 April 1969	1–1 (HT 1–0)	Scotland	A	Glasgow (SCO), Hampden Park	WC 1970 Qualification	95,951	
340	10 May 1969	1–0 (HT 0–0)	Austria	H	Nuremberg, Städtisches Stadion	WC 1970 Qualification	68,200	
341	21 May 1969	12–0 (7–0)	Cyprus	H	Essen, Georg-Melches-Stadion	WC 1970 Qualification	36,036	(Note: Third double-digit win; biggest defeat of Cyprus.)
342	21 September 1969	1–1 (HT 1–1)	Austria	A	Vienna (AUT), Praterstadion		28,000	
343	24 September 1969	1–0 (HT 1–0)	Bulgaria	A	Sofia (BUL), Vasil Levski National Stadium		50,000	
344	22 October 1969	3–2 (HT 1–1)	Scotland	H	Hamburg, Volksparkstadion	WC 1970 Qualification	70,448	
345	11 February 1970	0–2 (HT 0–2)	Spain	A	Seville (ESP), Estadio Ramón Sánchez Pizjuán		30,000	
346	8 April 1970	1–1 (HT 1–1)	Romania	H	Stuttgart, Neckarstadion		73,000	
347	9 May 1970	2–1 (HT 1–0)	Republic of Ireland	H	Berlin, Olympiastadion		70,000	
348	13 May 1970	1–0 (HT 1–0)	Yugoslavia	H	Hanover, Niedersachsenstadion		71,554	
349	3 June 1970	2–1 (HT 0–0)	Morocco	N	León (MEX), Estadio Guanajuato	WC 1970 Group	12,942	
350	7 June 1970	5–2 (HT 2–1)	Bulgaria	N	León (MEX), Estadio Guanajuato	WC 1970 Group	12,710	
351	10 June 1970	3–1 (HT 3–1)	Peru	N	León (MEX), Estadio Guanajuato	WC 1970 Group	17,875	
352	14 June 1970	3–2 (HT 0–1, 2–2, 2–2, 3–2) a.e.t	England	N	León (MEX), Estadio Guanajuato	WC 1970 Quarter final	23,357	
353	17 June 1970	3–4 (HT 0–1, 1–1, 2–3, 3–4) a.e.t	Italy	N	Mexico City (MEX), Estadio Azteca	WC 1970 Semi final	102,444	(Note: The Game of the Century.)
354	20 June 1970	1–0 (HT 1–0)	Uruguay	N	Mexico City (MEX), Estadio Azteca	WC 1970 3rd place	104,403	
355	9 September 1970	3–1 (HT 2–1)	Hungary	H	Nuremberg, Städtisches Stadion		67,000	
356	17 October 1970	1–1 (HT 1–1)	Turkey	H	Cologne, Müngersdorfer Stadion	EC 1972 Qualification	52,204	
357	18 November 1970	0–2 (HT 0–0)	Yugoslavia	A	Zagreb (YUG), Maksimir-Stadion		25,000	
358	22 November 1970	3–1 (HT 2–0)	Greece	A	Piraeus (GRE), Karaiskakis Stadium		35,259	
359	17 February 1971	1–0 (HT 1–0)	Albania	A	Tirana (ALB), Qemal Stafa Stadium	EC 1972 Qualification	18,082	
360	25 April 1971	3–0 (HT 1–0)	Turkey	A	Istanbul (TUR), İnönü Stadı	EC 1972 Qualification	38,097	
361	12 June 1971	2–0 (HT 2–0)	Albania	H	Karlsruhe, Wildparkstadion	EC 1972 Qualification	44,833	
362	22 June 1971	7–1 (HT 3–0)	Norway	A	Oslo (NOR), Ullevaal Stadion		19,857	(Note: Biggest win against Norway.)
363	27 June 1971	0–1 (HT 0–0)	Sweden	A	Gothenburg (SWE), Ullevi-Stadion		43,279	
364	30 June 1971	3–1 (HT 0–1)	Denmark	A	Copenhagen (DEN), Københavns Idrætspark		40,400	
365	8 September 1971	5–0 (HT 4–0)	Mexico	H	Hanover, Niedersachsenstadion		70,000	(Note: 100th match without conceding a goal.)
366	10 October 1971	3–1 (HT 1–1)	Poland	A	Warsaw (POL), X-Lecia-Stadion	EC 1972 Qualification	63,300	
367	17 November 1971	0–0	Poland	H	Hamburg, Volksparkstadion	EC 1972 Qualification	62,000	
368	29 March 1972	2–0 (HT 0–0)	Hungary	A	Budapest (HUN), Népstadion		50,000	
369	29 April 1972	3–1 (HT 1–0)	England	A	London (ENG), Wembley Stadium	EC 1972 Qualification play off	96,800	(Note: 200th win.)
370	13 May 1972	0–0	England	H	Berlin, Olympiastadion	EC 1972 Qualification play off	76,122	
371	26 May 1972	4–1 (HT 0–0)	Soviet Union	H	Munich, Olympiastadion		77,000	(Note: Biggest win against Soviet Union; Gerd Müller scores all four goals for Germany and becomes sole record scorer. He expands the record until 7 July 1974, reaching 68 goals and remains record scorer until 2014.)
372	14 June 1972	2–1 (HT 1–0)	Belgium	A	Antwerp (BEL), Bosuilstadion	EC 1972 Semi final	55,601	
373	18 June 1972	3–0 (HT 1–0)	Soviet Union	N	Brussels (BEL), Heysel Stadion	EC 1972 Final	43,066	(Note: First European title.)
374	15 November 1972	5–1 (HT 2–0)	Switzerland	H	Düsseldorf, Rheinstadion		70,387	
375	14 February 1973	2–3 (HT 0–2)	Argentina	H	Munich, Olympiastadion		50,000	
376	28 March 1973	3–0 (HT 1–0)	Czechoslovakia	H	Düsseldorf, Rheinstadion		70,000	
377	9 May 1973	0–1 (HT 0–0)	Yugoslavia	H	Munich, Olympiastadion		50,000	
378	12 May 1973	3–0 (HT 3–0)	Bulgaria	H	Hamburg, Volksparkstadion		45,000	
379	16 June 1973	0–1 (HT 0–0)	Brazil	H	Berlin, Olympiastadion		74,000	
380	5 September 1973	1–0 (HT 0–0)	Soviet Union	A	Moscow (URS), Lenin Central Stadium		61,647	
381	10 October 1973	4–0 (HT 2–0)	Austria	H	Hanover, Niedersachsenstadion		50,000	
382	13 October 1973	2–1 (HT 0–0)	France	H	Gelsenkirchen, Parkstadion		70,400	(Note: 100th home win.)
383	14 November 1973	1–1 (HT 0–1)	Scotland	A	Glasgow (SCO), Hampden Park		58,235	(Note: SFA 100th Anniversary Match.)
384	24 November 1973	2–1 (HT 2–0)	Spain	H	Stuttgart, Neckarstadion		70,000	
385	23 February 1974	0–1 (HT 0–1)	Spain	A	Barcelona (ESP), Sarrià Stadium		17,000	
386	26 February 1974	0–0	Italy	A	Rome (ITA), Stadio Olimpico		62,251	
387	27 March 1974	2–1 (HT 2–0)	Scotland	H	Frankfurt, Waldstadion		62,000	
388	17 April 1974	5–0 (HT 1–0)	Hungary	H	Dortmund, Westfalenstadion		54,010	
389	1 May 1974	2–0 (HT 0–0)	Sweden	H	Hamburg, Volksparkstadion		55,000	
390	14 June 1974	1–0 (HT 1–0)	Chile	H	Berlin, Olympiastadion	WC 1974 1. Group Stage	83,168	
391	18 June 1974	3–0 (HT 2–0)	Australia	H	Hamburg, Volksparkstadion	WC 1974 1. Group Stage	35,000	(Note: First match against Australia.)
392	22 June 1974	0–1 (HT 0–0)	East Germany	H	Hamburg, Volksparkstadion	WC 1974 1. Group Stage	60,350	(Note: Only match against East Germany.)
393	26 June 1974	2–0 (HT 1–0)	Yugoslavia	H	Düsseldorf, Rheinstadion	WC 1974 2. Group Stage	66,085	
394	30 June 1974	4–2 (HT 0–1)	Sweden	H	Düsseldorf, Rheinstadion	WC 1974 2. Group Stage	66,500	
395	3 July 1974	1–0 (HT 0–0)	Poland	H	Frankfurt, Waldstadion	WC 1974 2. Group Stage	59,000	(Note: Gerd Müller scores his 13th World Cup goal to tie with previous record holder Just Fontaine.)
396	7 July 1974	2–1 (HT 2–1)	Netherlands	H	Munich, Olympiastadion	WC 1974 Final	75,200	(Note: Second World Cup title; 100th Germany World Cup goal (scored by Gerd Müller, being also his last match and his last goal for Germany).)
397	4 September 1974	2–1 (HT 2–1)	Switzerland	A	Basel (SUI), St. Jakob Stadium		48,000	
398	20 November 1974	2–2 (HT 0–1)	Greece	A	Piraeus (GRE), Karaiskakis Stadium	EC 1976 Qualification	11,425	
399	22 December 1974	1–0 (HT 1–0)	Malta	A	Gżira (MLT), Empire Stadium	EC 1976 Qualification	12,528	(Note: First match against Malta.)
400	12 March 1975	0–2 (HT 0–2)	England	A	London (ENG), Wembley Stadium		100,000	
401	27 April 1975	1–1 (HT 0–0)	Bulgaria	A	Sofia (BUL), Vasil Levski National Stadium	EC 1976 Qualification	65,000	
402	17 May 1975	1–1 (HT 1–0)	Netherlands	H	Frankfurt, Waldstadion		53,000	
403	3 September 1975	2–0 (HT 0–0)	Austria	A	Vienna (AUT), Praterstadion		60,000	
404	11 October 1975	1–1 (HT 0–0)	Greece	H	Düsseldorf, Rheinstadion	EC 1976 Qualification	61,252	
405	19 November 1975	1–0 (HT 0–0)	Bulgaria	H	Stuttgart, Neckarstadion	EC 1976 Qualification	68,819	
406	20 December 1975	5–0 (HT 2–0)	Turkey	A	Istanbul (TUR), İnönü Stadı		25,000	
407	28 February 1976	8–0 (HT 4–0)	Malta	H	Dortmund, Westfalenstadion	EC 1976 Qualification	52,248	(Note: joint-biggest win against Malta.)
408	24 April 1976	1–1 (HT 0–1)	Spain	A	Madrid (ESP), Estadio Vicente Calderón	EC 1976 Qualification play off	63,000	
409	22 May 1976	2–0 (HT 2–0)	Spain	H	Munich, Olympiastadion	EC 1976 Qualification play off	77,673	
410	17 June 1976	4–2 (HT 0–2, 2–2, 2–2, 2–4) a.e.t	Yugoslavia	A	Belgrade (YUG), Stadion Roter Stern	EC 1976 Semi final	50,652	(Note: Only Euros match that Germany won in extra time (i.e without Golden Goal or penalty shootout).)
411	20 June 1976	2–2 (HT 1–2, 2–2, 2–2, 2–2) a.e.t 3–5 p	Czechoslovakia	N	Belgrade (YUG), Stadio Roter Stern	EC 1976 Final	30,790	(Note: Franz Beckenbauer becomes the first German and fifth player in the world to make 100 international appearances; only loss in a penalty shootout at World Cup or European Championship.)
412	6 October 1976	2–0 (HT 1–0)	Wales	A	Cardiff (WAL), Ninian Park		14,029	
413	17 November 1976	2–0 (HT 2–0)	Czechoslovakia	H	Hanover, Niedersachsenstadion		61,000	(Note: Heinz Flohe scored Germany's 1,000th goal.)
414	23 February 1977	0–1 (HT 0–0)	France	A	Paris (FRA), Prinzenparkstadion		43,802	(Note: 103rd and last match for Franz Beckenbauer.)
415	27 April 1977	5–0 (HT 0–0)	Northern Ireland	H	Cologne, Müngersdorfer Stadion		58,000	(Note: Biggest win against Northern Ireland, one day before of Sepp Herberger's death.)
416	30 April 1977	2–1 (HT 1–0)	Yugoslavia	A	Belgrade (YUG), Stadion Roter Stern		17,000	
417	5 June 1977	3–1 (HT 1–0)	Argentina	A	Buenos Aires (ARG), La Bombonera		60,000	
418	8 June 1977	2–0 (HT 1–0)	Uruguay	A	Montevideo (URU), Estadio Centenario		50,000	
419	12 June 1977	1–1 (HT 0–0)	Brazil	A	Rio de Janeiro (BRA), Maracanã-Stadion		106,066	
420	14 June 1977	2–2 (HT 0–2)	Mexico	A	Mexico City (MEX), Estadio Azteca		80,000	(Note: Referee from Mexican Federation.)
421	7 September 1977	1–0 (HT 1–0)	Finland	A	Helsinki (FIN), Helsinki Olympic Stadium		14,324	
422	8 October 1977	2–1 (HT 1–0)	Italy	H	Berlin, Olympiastadion		74,000	
423	16 November 1977	4–1 (HT 3–1)	Switzerland	H	Stuttgart, Neckarstadion		58,000	
424	14 December 1977	1–1 (HT 0–0)	Wales	H	Dortmund, Westfalenstadion		57,000	
425	22 February 1978	2–1 (HT 0–1)	England	H	Munich, Olympiastadion		77,850	
426	8 March 1978	1–0 (HT 0–0)	Soviet Union	H	Frankfurt, Waldstadion		54,000	
427	5 April 1978	0–1 (HT 0–0)	Brazil	H	Hamburg, Volksparkstadion		61,500	
428	19 April 1978	1–3 (HT 1–1)	Sweden	A	Solna (SWE), Råsundastadion		27,355	
429	1 June 1978	0–0	Poland	N	Buenos Aires (ARG), El Monumental	WC 1978 1. Group Stage	67,579	
430	6 June 1978	6–0 (HT 4–0)	Mexico	N	Córdoba (ARG), Estadio Córdoba	WC 1978 1. Group Stage	35,258	(Note: Biggest win against Mexico.)
431	10 June 1978	0–0	Tunisia	N	Córdoba (ARG), Estadio Córdoba	WC 1978 1. Group Stage	30,667	(Note: First match against Tunisia.)
432	14 June 1978	0–0	Italy	N	Buenos Aires (ARG), El Monumental	WC 1978 2. Group Stage	67,547	
433	18 June 1978	2–2 (HT 1–1)	Netherlands	N	Córdoba (ARG), Estadio Córdoba	WC 1978 2. Group Stage	40,750	
434	21 June 1978	2–3 (HT 1–0)	Austria	N	Córdoba (ARG), Estadio Córdoba	WC 1978 2. Group Stage	38,218	(Note: 139th and last match under coach Helmut Schön.)
435	11 October 1978	4–3 (HT 4–1)	Czechoslovakia	A	Prague (CZS), Evžen-Rošický-Stadion		30,000	(Note: First match under Jupp Derwall.)
436	15 November 1978	0–0	Hungary	H	Frankfurt, Waldstadion		45,000	(Note: Farewell match for national coach Helmut Schön; abandoned in 60th minute due to fog.)
437	20 December 1978	3–1 (HT 1–0)	Netherlands	H	Düsseldorf, Rheinstadion		68,000	
438	25 February 1979	0–0	Malta	A	Gżira (MLT), Empire Stadium	EC 1980 Qualification	8,450	
439	1 April 1979	0–0	Turkey	A	İzmir (TUR), Atatürk-Stadion	EC 1980 Qualification	68,000	
440	2 May 1979	2–0 (HT 1–0)	Wales	A	Wrexham (WAL), Racecourse Ground	EC 1980 Qualification	26,900	
441	22 May 1979	3–1 (HT 1–1)	Republic of Ireland	A	Dublin (IRL), Lansdowne Road		22,000	
442	26 May 1979	3–1 (HT 2–0)	Iceland	A	Reykjavík (ISL), Laugardalsvöllur		8,240	* 100. away win
443	12 September 1979	2–1 (HT 0–0)	Argentina	H	Berlin, Olympiastadion		45,000	
444	17 October 1979	5–1 (HT 4–0)	Wales	H	Cologne, Müngersdorfer Stadion	EC 1980 Qualification	61,000	(Note: Biggest win against Wales.)
445	21 November 1979	3–1 (HT 1–0)	Soviet Union	A	Tbilisi (URS), Lenin Stadium		40,000	
446	22 December 1979	2–0 (HT 1–0)	Turkey	H	Gelsenkirchen, Parkstadion	EC 1980 Qualification	70,000	
447	27 February 1980	8–0 (HT 3–0)	Malta	H	Bremen, Weserstadion	EC 1980 Qualification	33,278	
448	2 April 1980	1–0 (HT 1–0)	Austria	H	Munich, Olympiastadion		78,000	
449	13 May 1980	3–1 (HT 2–1)	Poland	H	Frankfurt, Waldstadion		45,000	
450	11 June 1980	1–0 (HT 0–0)	Czechoslovakia	N	Rome (ITA), Stadio Olimpico	EC 1980 Group	10,500	
451	14 June 1980	3–2 (HT 1–0)	Netherlands	N	Naples (ITA), Stadio San Paolo	EC 1980 Group	29,889	(Note: Lothar Matthäus debut.)
452	17 June 1980	0–0	Greece	N	Turin (ITA), Stadio Comunale	EC 1980 Group	13,901	(Note: End of a series of 12 consecutive wins.)
453	22 June 1980	2–1 (HT 1–0)	Belgium	N	Rome (ITA), Stadio Olimpico	EC 1980 Final	47,860	(Note: Second European title.)
454	10 September 1980	3–2 (HT 1–0)	Switzerland	A	Basel (SUI), St. Jakob Stadium		32,000	
455	11 October 1980	1–1 (HT 1–1)	Netherlands	A	Eindhoven (NED), Philips Stadion		22,000	
456	19 November 1980	4–1 (HT 2–1)	France	H	Hanover, Niedersachsenstadion		63,000	
457	3 December 1980	3–1 (HT 2–0)	Bulgaria	A	Sofia (BUL), Vasil Levski National Stadium	WC 1982 Qualification	50,000	(Note: To date, the only national team to remain unbeaten in two consecutive calendar years (excluding the years 1915-1919 and 1943-1949, in which Germany did not play).)
458	1 January 1981	1–2 (HT 1–0)	Argentina	N	Montevideo (URU), Estadio Centenario	Mundialito 1980 Group	55,000	(Note: End of the longest series without defeat with 23 consecutive games.)
459	7 January 1981	1–4 (HT 0–0)	Brazil	N	Montevideo (URU), Estadio Centenario	Mundialito 1980 Group	50,000	
460	1 April 1981	2–0 (HT 1–0)	Albania	A	Tirana (ALB), Qemal Stafa Stadium	WC 1982 Qualification	19,203	
461	29 April 1981	2–0 (HT 2–0)	Austria	H	Hamburg, Volksparkstadion	WC 1982 Qualification	61,400	
462	19 May 1981	1–2 (HT 1–0)	Brazil	H	Stuttgart, Neckarstadion		71,000	
463	24 May 1981	4–0 (HT 3–0)	Finland	A	Lahti (FIN), Lahti Stadium	WC 1982 Qualification	10,030	
464	2 September 1981	2–0 (HT 0–0)	Poland	A	Chorzów (POL), Stadion Śląski		70,000	
465	23 September 1981	7–1 (HT 2–1)	Finland	H	Bochum, Ruhrstadion	WC 1982 Qualification	42,000	
466	14 October 1981	3–1 (HT 2–1)	Austria	A	Vienna (AUT), Praterstadion	WC 1982 Qualification	72,000	
467	18 November 1981	8–0 (HT 5–0)	Albania	H	Dortmund, Westfalenstadion	WC 1982 Qualification	40,000	(Note: Biggest win against Albania.)
468	22 November 1981	4–0 (HT 1–0)	Bulgaria	H	Düsseldorf, Rheinstadion	WC 1982 Qualification	50,000	
469	17 February 1982	3–1 (HT 2–1)	Portugal	H	Hanover, Niedersachsenstadion		50,000	
470	21 March 1982	0–1 (HT 0–0)	Brazil	A	Rio de Janeiro (BRA), Maracanã-Stadion		150,289	(Note: Match involving Germany with the highest number of spectators (150,289).)
471	24 March 1982	1–1 (HT 1–0)	Argentina	A	Buenos Aires (ARG), El Monumental		69,000	
472	14 April 1982	2–1 (HT 1–0)	Czechoslovakia	H	Cologne, Müngersdorfer Stadion		57,000	
473	12 May 1982	4–2 (HT 3–1)	Norway	A	Oslo (NOR), Ullevaal Stadion		20,097	
474	16 June 1982	1–2 (HT 0–0)	Algeria	N	Gijón (ESP), El Molinón	WC 1982 1. Group Stage	42,000	
475	20 June 1982	4–1 (HT 1–0)	Chile	N	Gijón (ESP), El Molinón	WC 1982 1. Group Stage	42,000	(Note: Biggest win against Chile.)
476	25 June 1982	1–0 (HT 1–0)	Austria	N	Gijón (ESP), El Molinón	WC 1982 1. Group Stage	41,000	(Note: Disgrace of Gijón.)
477	29 June 1982	0–0	England	N	Madrid (ESP), Estadio Santiago Bernabéu	WC 1982 2. Group Stage	75,000	
478	2 July 1982	2–1 (HT 0–0)	Spain	A	Madrid (ESP), Estadio Santiago Bernabéu	WC 1982 2. Group Stage	90,089	
479	8 July 1982	3–3 (HT 1–1, 1–1, 3–2, 3–3) a.e.t 5–4 p	France	N	Seville (ESP), Estadio Ramón Sánchez Pizjuán	WC 1982 Semi final	63,000	`
480	11 July 1982	1–3 (HT 0–0)	Italy	N	Madrid (ESP), Estadio Santiago Bernabéu	WC 1982 Final	90,000	
481	22 September 1982	0–0	Belgium	H	Munich, Olympiastadion		25,000	
482	13 October 1982	2–1 (HT 0–0)	England	A	London (ENG), Wembley Stadium		68,000	
483	17 November 1982	0–1 (HT 0–1)	Northern Ireland	A	Belfast (NIR), Windsor Park	EC 1984 Qualification	15,000	
484	23 February 1983	0–1 (HT 0–0)	Portugal	A	Lisbon (POR), Estádio do Restelo		10,000	
485	30 March 1983	2–1 (HT 0–0)	Albania	A	Tirana (ALB), Qemal Stafa Stadium	EC 1984 Qualification	25,000	
486	23 April 1983	3–0 (HT 2–0)	Turkey	A	İzmir (TUR), Atatürk-Stadion	EC 1984 Qualification	72,000	
487	27 April 1983	0–0	Austria	A	Vienna (AUT), Praterstadion	EC 1984 Qualification	60,000	
488	7 June 1983	4–2 (HT 2–0)	Yugoslavia	N	Luxembourg (LUX), Stade Municipal	* FLF 75th Anniversary Match	11,000	
489	7 September 1983	1–1 (HT 0–1)	Hungary	A	Budapest (HUN), Népstadion		30,000	
490	5 October 1983	3–0 (HT 3–0)	Austria	H	Gelsenkirchen, Parkstadion	EC 1984 Qualification	71,000	
491	26 October 1983	5–1 (HT 1–0)	Turkey	H	Berlin, Olympiastadion	EC 1984 Qualification	35,000	
492	16 November 1983	0–1 (HT 0–0)	Northern Ireland	H	Hamburg, Volksparkstadion	EC 1984 Qualification	61,418	
493	20 November 1983	2–1 (HT 1–1)	Albania	H	Saarbrücken, Ludwigsparkstadion	EC 1984 Qualification	40,100	
494	15 February 1984	3–2 (HT 1–0)	Bulgaria	A	Warna (BUL), Yuri Gagarin Stadium		15,000	
495	29 February 1984	1–0 (HT 0–0)	Belgium	A	Brussels (BEL), Heysel Stadion		23,000	
496	28 March 1984	2–1 (HT 1–1)	Soviet Union	H	Hanover, Niedersachsenstadion		45,000	
497	18 April 1984	0–1 (HT 0–0)	France	A	Strasbourg (FRA), Meinau-Stadion		39,978	
498	22 May 1984	1–0 (HT 0–0)	Italy	N	Zurich (SUI), Letzigrund	* FIFA 80th Anniversary Match	26,700	
499	14 June 1984	0–0	Portugal	N	Strasbourg (FRA), Meinau-Stadion	EC 1984 Group	44,707	
500	17 June 1984	2–1 (HT 1–0)	Romania	N	Lens (FRA), Stade Félix Bollaert	EC 1984 Group	31,787	
501	20 June 1984	0–1 (HT 0–0)	Spain	N	Paris (FRA), Prinzenparkstadion	EC 1984 Group	47,691	(Note: Last match under Jupp Derwall.)
502	12 September 1984	1–3 (HT 0–2)	Argentina	H	Düsseldorf, Rheinstadion		45,000	(Note: First match under Franz Beckenbauer.)
503	17 October 1984	2–0 (HT 0–0)	Sweden	H	Cologne, Müngersdorfer Stadion	WC 1986 Qualification	61,000	
504	16 December 1984	3–2 (HT 1–1)	Malta	A	Attard (MLT), Ta’ Qali-Stadion	WC 1986 Qualification	35,102	
505	29 January 1985	0–1 (HT 0–0)	Hungary	H	Hamburg, Volksparkstadion		22,000	
506	24 February 1985	2–1 (HT 2–0)	Portugal	A	Oeiras (POR), Estádio Nacional	WC 1986 Qualification	60,000	
507	27 March 1985	6–0 (HT 5–0)	Malta	H	Saarbrücken, Ludwigsparkstadion	WC 1986 Qualification	37,600	
508	17 April 1985	4–1 (HT 2–1)	Bulgaria	H	Augsburg, Rosenaustadion		35,000	
509	30 April 1985	5–1 (HT 4–0)	Czechoslovakia	A	Prague (CZS), Evžen-Rošický-Stadion	WC 1986 Qualification	35,000	(Note: Biggest win against Czechoslovakia.)
510	12 June 1985	0–3 (HT 0–1)	England	N	Mexico City (MEX), Estadio Azteca	Mexico Cup 1985	10,000	
511	15 June 1985	0–2 (HT 0–1)	Mexico	A	Mexico City (MEX), Estadio Azteca	Mexico Cup 1985	25,000	
512	28 August 1985	0–1 (HT 0–0)	Soviet Union	A	Moscow (URS), Lenin Central Stadium		82,000	
513	25 September 1985	2–2 (HT 2–0)	Sweden	A	Solna (SWE), Råsundastadion	WC 1986 Qualification	39,157	
514	16 October 1985	0–1 (HT 0–0)	Portugal	H	Stuttgart, Neckarstadion	WC 1986 Qualification	60,000	(Note: First defeat in a World Cup Qualification match.)
515	17 November 1985	2–2 (HT 1–0)	Czechoslovakia	H	Munich, Olympiastadion	WC 1986 Qualification	18,000	
516	5 February 1986	2–1 (HT 1–1)	Italy	A	Avellino (ITA), Stadio Partenio		35,822	
517	12 March 1986	2–0 (HT 1–0)	Brazil	H	Frankfurt, Waldstadion		52,000	(Note: Only match against Brazil in which Germany did not concede.)
518	9 April 1986	1–0 (HT 1–0)	Switzerland	A	Basel (SUI), St. Jakob Stadium		25,000	
519	11 May 1986	1–1 (HT 0–1)	Yugoslavia	H	Bochum, Ruhrstadion		30,000	
520	14 May 1986	3–1 (HT 2–0)	Netherlands	H	Dortmund, Westfalenstadion		36,000	
521	4 June 1986	1–1 (HT 0–1)	Uruguay	N	Querétaro (MEX), Estadio La Corregidora	WC 1986 Group	30,500	
522	8 June 1986	2–1 (HT 1–1)	Scotland	N	Querétaro (MEX), Estadio La Corregidora	WC 1986 Group	30,000	
523	13 June 1986	0–2 (HT 0–1)	Denmark	N	Querétaro (MEX), Estadio La Corregidora	WC 1986 Group	36,000	
524	17 June 1986	1–0 (HT 0–0)	Morocco	N	San Nicolás de los Garza (MEX), Estadio Universitario	WC 1986 Round of 16	19,800	
525	21 June 1986	0–0 a.e.t 4–1 p	Mexico	A	San Nicolás de los Garza (MEX), Estadio Universitario	WC 1986 Quarter final	41,700	
526	25 June 1986	2–0 (HT 1–0)	France	N	Guadalajara (MEX), Estadio Jalisco	WC 1986 Semi final	45,000	
527	29 June 1986	2–3 (HT 0–1)	Argentina	N	Mexico City (MEX), Estadio Azteca	WC 1986 Final	114,600	
528	24 September 1986	2–0 (HT 2–0)	Denmark	A	Copenhagen (DEN), Københavns Idrætspark		45,000	
529	15 October 1986	2–2 (HT 0–1)	Spain	H	Hanover, Niedersachsenstadion		50,000	
530	29 October 1986	1–4 (HT 0–0)	Austria	A	Vienna (AUT), Praterstadion		55,000	
531	25 March 1987	2–0 (HT 1–0)	Israel	A	Ramat Gan (ISR), Ramat Gan Stadium		18,000	(Note: First match against Israel.)
532	18 April 1987	0–0	Italy	H	Cologne, Müngersdorfer Stadion		55,000	
533	12 August 1987	2–1 (HT 2–1)	France	H	Berlin, Olympiastadion		31,000	
534	9 September 1987	3–1 (HT 2–1)	England	H	Düsseldorf, Rheinstadion		50,000	(Note: 300th win.)
535	23 September 1987	1–0 (HT 1–0)	Denmark	H	Hamburg, Volksparkstadion		45,000	
536	14 October 1987	1–1 (HT 1–0)	Sweden	H	Gelsenkirchen, Parkstadion		31,000	(Note: 100th draw.)
537	18 November 1987	0–0	Hungary	A	Budapest (HUN), Népstadion		25,000	
538	12 December 1987	1–1 (HT 0–0)	Brazil	A	Brasília (BRA), Estádio Mané Garrincha		30,000	
539	16 December 1987	0–1 (HT 0–0)	Argentina	A	Buenos Aires (ARG), Estadio José Amalfitani		50,000	
540	31 March 1988	1–1 (HT 1–0); 2–4 p	Sweden	H	Berlin, Olympiastadion	Four Nations Tournament Semi-final	23,709	* (Note: No extra-time played.)
541	2 April 1988	1–0 (HT 1–0)	Argentina	H	Berlin, Olympiastadion	Four Nations Tournament 3rd place	25,000	
542	27 April 1988	1–0 (HT 0–0)	Switzerland	H	Kaiserslautern, Fritz-Walter-Stadion		30,150	
543	4 June 1988	1–1 (HT 0–1)	Yugoslavia	H	Bremen, Weserstadion		13,000	
544	10 June 1988	1–1 (HT 0–0)	Italy	H	Düsseldorf, Rheinstadion	EC 1988 Group	62,552	
545	14 June 1988	2–0 (HT 1–0)	Denmark	H	Gelsenkirchen, Parkstadion	EC 1988 Group	64,812	
546	17 June 1988	2–0 (HT 1–0)	Spain	H	Munich, Olympiastadion	EC 1988 Group	63,802	
547	21 June 1988	1–2 (HT 0–0)	Netherlands	H	Hamburg, Volksparkstadion	EC 1988 Semi final	56,150	
548	31 August 1988	4–0 (HT 3–0)	Finland	A	Helsinki (FIN), Helsinki Olympic Stadium	WC 1990 Qualification	31,693	
549	21 September 1988	1–0 (HT 0–0)	Soviet Union	H	Düsseldorf, Rheinstadion		16,000	
550	19 October 1988	0–0	Netherlands	H	Munich, Olympiastadion	WC 1990 Qualification	69,442	
551	22 March 1989	2–1 (HT 0–0)	Bulgaria	A	Sofia (BUL), Vasil Levski Stadium		40,000	
552	26 April 1989	1–1 (HT 0–0)	Netherlands	A	Rotterdam (NED), De Kuip	WC 1990 Qualification	50,500	
553	31 May 1989	0–0	Wales	A	Cardiff (WAL), National Stadium	WC 1990 Qualification	30,000	
554	6 September 1989	1–1 (HT 1–1)	Republic of Ireland	A	Dublin (IRL), Lansdowne Road		46,000	
555	4 October 1989	6–1 (HT 1–0)	Finland	H	Dortmund, Westfalenstadion	WC 1990 Qualification	40,000	
556	15 November 1989	2–1 (HT 1–1)	Wales	H	Cologne, Müngersdorfer Stadion	WC 1990 Qualification	60,000	
557	28 February 1990	1–2 (HT 1–1)	France	A	Montpellier (FRA), Stade de la Mosson		22,000	
558	25 April 1990	3–3 (HT 0–0)	Uruguay	H	Stuttgart, Neckarstadion		35,000	
559	26 May 1990	1–0 (HT 1–0)	Czechoslovakia	H	Düsseldorf, Rheinstadion		26,000	
560	30 May 1990	1–0 (HT 1–0)	Denmark	H	Gelsenkirchen, Parkstadion		42,000	
561	10 June 1990	4–1 (HT 2–0)	Yugoslavia	N	Milan (ITA), Stadio Giuseppe Meazza	WC 1990 Group	74,765	(Note: Last match against Yugoslavia.)
562	15 June 1990	5–1 (HT 2–0)	United Arab Emirates	N	Milan (ITA), Stadio Giuseppe Meazza	WC 1990 Group	71,167	(Note: First match against United Arabian Emirates.)
563	19 June 1990	1–1 (HT 0–0)	Colombia	N	Milan (ITA), Stadio Giuseppe Meazza	WC 1990 Group	72,510	(Note: First match against Colombia.)
564	24 June 1990	2–1 (HT 0–0)	Netherlands	N	Milan (ITA), Stadio Giuseppe Meazza	WC 1990 Round of 16	74,559	
565	1 July 1990	1–0 (HT 1–0)	Czechoslovakia	N	Milan (ITA), Stadio Giuseppe Meazza	WC 1990 Quarter final	73,347	
566	4 July 1990	1–1 (HT 0–0, 1–1, 1–1, 1–1) a.e.t, 4–3 p	England	N	Turin (ITA), Stadio delle Alpi	WC 1990 Semi final	62,628	
567	8 July 1990	1–0 (HT 0–0)	Argentina	N	Rome (ITA), Stadio Olimpico	WC 1990 Final	73,603	(Note: Third World Cup title; 66th and last match under Franz Beckenbauer.)
568	29 August 1990	1–1 (HT 1–0)	Portugal	A	Lisbon (POR), Estádio da Luz		20,000	(Note: First match under Berti Vogts.)

== Cancelled matches ==
Below is a list of all matches in the period that were cancelled. Matches that were rescheduled to another date are not included.

Date	Opponent	Venue	Notes
15 November 1978	Hungary	Frankfurt, Waldstadion	Abandoned in the 60th minute due to fog (0-0).
25 March 1987	Soviet Union	Tbilisi; Lenin Stadium	For the Soviet team accounted for in March 1987 scheduled test match without replacement. The German team played instead on the scheduled date the first match against Israel in Ramat Gan.
21 November 1990	East Germany	Leipzig, Zentralstadion	The match was originally scheduled as a first leg of Euro 1992 Qualification, the second leg to take place in 1991 in Munich. After the DFV cancelled its participation in the qualification because of the foreseeable demise of the East Germany, it was proposed the match be played as a so-called 'unification match', but was canceled at short notice due to security concerns from the DFB.

== See also ==
- East Germany national football team results (1952–1990)
- Germany national football team records
- Germany national football team results (1908–1929)
- Germany national football team results (1930–1942)
- Germany national football team results (1990–1999)
- Germany national football team results (2000–2019)
- Germany national football team results (2020–present)
