= UEFA Euro 1972 qualifying Group 5 =

Football tournament qualification stage

Group 5 of the UEFA Euro 1972 qualifying tournament was one of the eight groups to decide which teams would qualify for the UEFA Euro 1972 finals tournament. Group 5 consisted of four teams: Belgium, Portugal, Scotland, and Denmark, where they played against each other home-and-away in a round-robin format. The group winners were Belgium, who finished two points above Portugal.

== Final table ==
Pos	Team	Pld	W	D	L	GF	GA	GD	Pts	Qualification	(Belgium)	(Portugal)	(Scotland)	(Denmark)
1	Belgium	6	4	1	1	11	3	+8	9	Advance to quarter-finals	—	3–0	3–0	2–0
2	Portugal	6	3	1	2	10	6	+4	7		1–1	—	2–0	5–0
3	Scotland	6	3	0	3	4	7	−3	6		1–0	2–1	—	1–0
4	Denmark	6	1	0	5	2	11	−9	2		1–2	0–1	1–0	—

Source: UEFA
Rules for classification: Qualification tiebreakers

== Matches ==
14 October 1970
19:00

Denmark	0–1	Portugal
	Report	João 40'

Idrætsparken, Copenhagen
Attendance: 17,317
Referee: Leo Callaghan (Wales)

11 November 1970
20:00

Scotland	1–0	Denmark
O'Hare 13'	Report

Hampden Park, Glasgow
Attendance: 24,618
Referee: Erich Linemayr (Austria)

25 November 1970
20:00

Belgium	2–0	Denmark
Devrindt 17', 37'	Report

Stade Klokke, Bruges
Attendance: 9,697
Referee: John Carpenter (Rep. of Ireland)

3 February 1971
20:00

Belgium	3–0	Scotland
McKinnon 39' (o.g.); Van Himst 57', 85' (pen.)	Report

Stade Sclessin, Liège
Attendance: 13,931
Referee: Antonio Sbardella (Italy)

17 February 1971
20:00

Belgium	3–0	Portugal
Lambert 14', 64' (pen.); De Nul 75'	Report

Stade Émile Versé, Anderlecht
Attendance: 26,921
Referee: Gaspar Pintado Viu (Spain)

21 April 1971
21:30

Portugal	2–0	Scotland
Stanton 22' (o.g.); Eusébio 83'	Report

Estádio da Luz, Lisbon
Attendance: 35,463
Referee: Michel Kitabdjian (France)

12 May 1971
21:30

Portugal	5–0	Denmark
Rodrigues 17'; Eusébio 42'; Baptista 47', 49'; Sandvad 87' (o.g.)	Report

Estádio das Antas, Porto
Attendance: 16,391
Referee: Malcolm Wright (Northern Ireland)

26 May 1971
19:00

Denmark	1–2	Belgium
Bjerre 76'	Report	Devrindt 65', 75'

Idrætsparken, Copenhagen
Attendance: 27,266
Referee: Kåre Sirevaag (Norway)

9 June 1971
19:00

Denmark	1–0	Scotland
Laudrup 43'	Report

Idrætsparken, Copenhagen
Attendance: 37,682
Referee: Wolfgang Riedel (East Germany)

13 October 1971
20:00

Scotland	2–1	Portugal
O'Hare 22'; Gemmill 58'	Report	Rodrigues 56'

Hampden Park, Glasgow
Attendance: 58,612
Referee: Brunon Piotrowicz (Poland)

10 November 1971
19:30

Scotland	1–0	Belgium
O'Hare 6'	Report

Pittodrie Stadium, Aberdeen
Attendance: 36,500
Referee: Johan Einar Boström (Sweden)

21 November 1971
15:00

Portugal	1–1	Belgium
Peres 90' (pen.)	Report	Lambert 61'

Estádio da Luz, Lisbon
Attendance: 53,577
Referee: Kenneth Howard Burns (England)

== Goalscorers ==
There were 27 goals scored in 12 matches, for an average of 2.25 goals per match.

4 goals

- (Belgium) Johan Devrindt

3 goals

- (Belgium) Raoul Lambert
- (Scotland) John O'Hare

2 goals

- (Belgium) Paul Van Himst
- (Portugal) Vítor Baptista
- (Portugal) Eusébio
- (Portugal) Rui Rodrigues

1 goal

- (Belgium) André De Nul
- (Denmark) Kresten Bjerre
- (Denmark) Finn Laudrup
- (Portugal) Jacinto João
- (Portugal) Fernando Peres
- (Scotland) Archie Gemmill

1 own goal

- (Denmark) Erik Sandvad (against Portugal)
- (Scotland) Ronnie McKinnon (against Belgium)
- (Scotland) Pat Stanton (against Portugal)
