= UEFA Euro 1972 final =

European football tournament final match

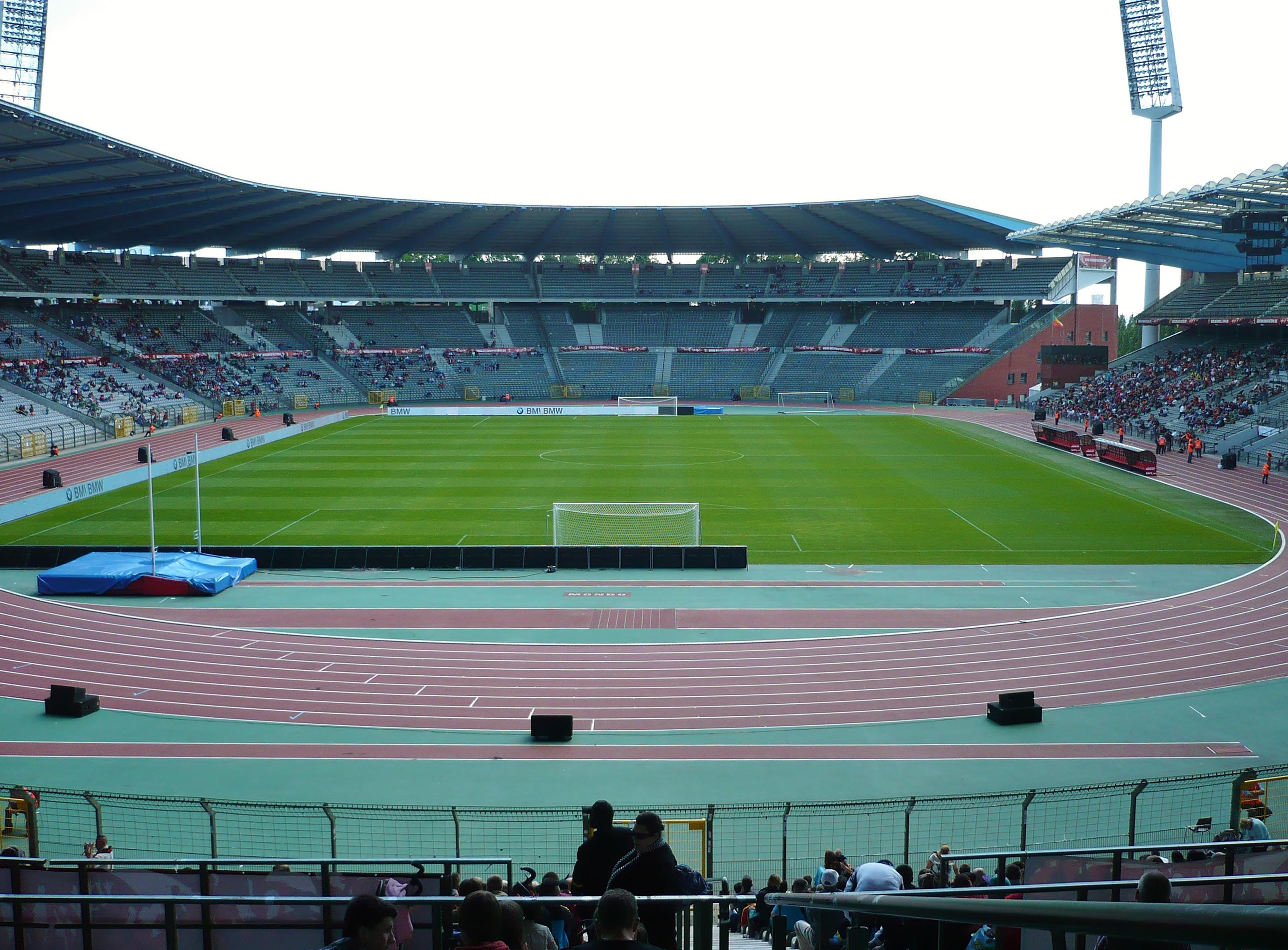
- The final was played at Heysel Stadium (pictured in 2013).
- Event: UEFA Euro 1972
West Germany	Soviet Union
3	0
- Date: 18 June 1972
- Venue: Heysel Stadium, Brussels
- Referee: Ferdinand Marschall (Austria)
- Attendance: 43,437

The UEFA Euro 1972 final was a football match played at Heysel Stadium in Brussels, Belgium, on 18 June 1972, to determine the winners of the UEFA Euro 1972 tournament. It was the fourth European Championship final, UEFA's top football competition for national teams. The match was contested by West Germany and two-time tournament finalists, the Soviet Union.

En route to the final, West Germany finished top of their qualifying group, which included Turkey, Albania and Poland. After beating England over a two-legged tie in the quarter-finals, they progressed to the final after defeating tournament hosts Belgium in the semi-finals. The Soviet Union also won their qualifying group, which included Cyprus, Spain, and Northern Ireland before beating Yugoslavia in the two-legged quarter-finals, and then Hungary in the single-match semi-final.

The final was played in front of 43,437 spectators, and was refereed by Ferdinand Marschall from Austria. West Germany won the match 3–0 to secure a first European Championship title in the nation's history.

== Background ==
UEFA Euro 1972 was the fourth edition of the UEFA European Football Championship, UEFA's football competition for national teams. Qualifying rounds were played on a home-and-away round-robin tournament basis prior to the semi-finals and final taking place in Belgium, between 14 and 18 June 1972. A third-place play-off match took place the day before the final.

The Soviet Union had lost at the semi-final stage of UEFA Euro 1968, going out after a coin toss following a 0–0 draw with Italy. West Germany failed to progress past their qualifying group, finishing as runners-up to Yugoslavia who were eventual tournament finalists. In the 1970 FIFA World Cup, West Germany lost in the semi-final 4–3 to Italy but won the third-place play-off match 1–0 against Uruguay, who had knocked the Soviet Union out in the quarter-finals. The UEFA Euro 1972 Final was the second-ever competitive match between the sides, their first being in the 1966 FIFA World Cup which was won 2–1 by West Germany.

== Route to the final ==
=== West Germany ===
West Germany's route to the final
Round	Opposition	Score
Qualifying group	Turkey	1–1 (H), 3–0 (A)
Qualifying group	Albania	1–0 (A), 2–0 (H)
Qualifying group	Poland	3–1 (A), 0–0 (H)
Quarter-final	England	3–1 (A), 0–0 (H)
Semi-final	Belgium	2–1 (A)

West Germany commenced their UEFA Euro 1972 campaign in Qualifying Group 8 where they faced three other teams in a home-and-away round-robin tournament. Their first fixture was against Turkey at the Müngersdorfer Stadion in Cologne on 17 October 1970. Kamuran Yavuz gave Turkey the lead in the 15th minute but Gerd Müller equalised with a penalty kick eight minutes before half-time. The second half was goalless and the match ended 1–1. West Germany's next opponents were Albania with their first match being played at the Qemal Stafa Stadium in Tirana on 17 February 1971. Müller scored the only goal of the game late in the first half to secure a 1–0 victory for West Germany. The next qualifying match for West Germany was the return fixture against Turkey which took place at the İnönü Stadı in Istanbul on 25 April 1971. Müller scored his third and fourth goals of the qualifying stage, two minutes either side of half time, and Horst Köppel made it 3–0 midway through the second half. West Germany then faced Albania at the Wildparkstadion in Karlsruhe on 12 June 1971 where first-half goals from Günter Netzer and Jürgen Grabowski secured a 2–0 win for the hosts. The final opponents in Group 8 for West Germany were Poland with the first match taking place at the Stadion Dziesięciolecia in Warsaw on 10 October 1971. Robert Gadocha gave Poland the lead midway through the first half but Müller equalised a minute later. He doubled his tally 19 minutes into the second half before Grabowski's goal twenty minutes before the end of the match ensured a 3–1 win for West Germany. The return match was played on 17 November 1971 at the Volksparkstadion in Hamburg, which ended goalless. West Germany finished their qualifying campaign top of Group 8 and progressed to the quarter-finals.

There, West Germany faced their 1966 FIFA World Cup Final opponents England and the first match of the two-legged tie was played at Wembley Stadium in London on 29 April 1972 in front of 96,800 spectators. In rainy conditions, West Germany dominated the game while England defended deeply and committed numerous fouls. In the 27th minute, Bobby Moore lost possession of the ball, allowing Uli Hoeneß to shoot from around 20 yards (18 m), his strike taking a deflection off Norman Hunter and beating Gordon Banks in the England goal. Emlyn Hughes saw his half-volley strike the top of the West Germany crossbar before Francis Lee equalised for England in the 76th minute; a shot from Martin Peters was kept out by Sepp Maier but Lee converted the rebound from close range. West Germany regained the lead seven minutes later. Moore fouled Sigfried Held and although Banks got a hand to the resulting penalty from Netzer, the ball spun into the net. With two minutes remaining, Held won the ball from Hughes, passed to Hoeneß who then gave it to Müller whose low shot beat Banks to give West Germany a 3–1 victory. The return match was held two weeks later at the Olympiastadion in Berlin. In another match marred by fouls from both teams, each side had limited opportunities to score. Martin Chivers saw his shot cleared off the goalline by Horst-Dieter Höttges while both Netzer and Held missed chances. In the second half, Hans-Georg Schwarzenbeck cleared the ball from the West Germany goalmouth under pressure from Rodney Marsh. The game ended goalless and with a 3–1 aggregate victory, West Germany progressed to the semi-final where they faced the host team Belgium.

The match was held at the Bosuilstadion in Antwerp on 14 June 1972 in front of a crowd of 55,669. Helmut Schön, the West Germany manager, described the pitch as "an unplayable stone desert" but despite that, his side took the lead midway through the first half through Müller. Netzer crossed the ball into the centre and Müller rose to head the ball past Christian Piot, the Belgium goalkeeper who had attempted to punch the ball clear. The second half saw Maier make saves from both Georges Heylens and Léon Semmeling but with less than 20 minutes remaining, Müller scored, once again from a Netzer pass, to make it 2–0 to West Germany. In the 83rd minute, Jean Dockx's pass found Odilon Polleunis who held off Herbert Wimmer and struck the ball into the roof of the West Germany goal. Late in the match, Belgium's Erwin Vandendaele headed a Raoul Lambert corner wide of goal and the game ended 2–1 to West Germany who qualified for their first European Championship final.

=== Soviet Union ===
The Soviet Union's route to the final
Round	Opposition	Score
Qualifying group	Cyprus	3–1 (A), 6–1 (H)
Qualifying group	Spain	2–1 (H), 0–0 (A)
Qualifying group	Northern Ireland	1–0 (H), 1–1 (A)
Quarter-final	Yugoslavia	0–0 (A), 3–0 (H)
Semi-final	Hungary	1–0 (N)

The Soviet Union's first match in their qualifying group were Cyprus who they faced at the GSP Stadium in Nicosia on 15 November 1970. Early goals from Viktor Kolotov and Gennady Yevryuzhikhin gave the Soviet Union a 2–0 lead but Nikos Charalambous reduced the deficit for Cyprus just before half-time. Vitaly Shevchenko scored five minutes after the interval and with no further goals, the match ended 3–1. The Soviet Union's next match was against Spain and took place at the Central Lenin Stadium in Moscow on 30 May 1971. The first half was goalless and Kolotov gave the Soviet Union the lead in the 79th minute before Shevchenko doubled his side's advantage four minutes later. Carles Rexach halved the deficit for Spain with two minutes of the match remaining but it ended 2–1 to the Soviet Union. They faced Cyprus in the return match nine days later at the Central Lenin Stadium where they secured a 6–1 victory, with a goal each from Kolotov and Anatoliy Banishevskiy, and a brace from both Yevryuzhikhin and Vladimir Fedotov, while Stefanis Michael scored the consolation goal for Cyprus. The Soviet Union's third and final group opponent were Northern Ireland who they faced at the Central Lenin Stadium on 22 September 1971. Vladimir Muntyan scored the only goal of the game just before half-time to give the Soviet Union a 1–0 win. The two sides met again three weeks later, this time at Windsor Park in Belfast. Jimmy Nicholson scored in the 13th minute to give the hosts the lead but Anatoliy Byshovets equalised 15 minutes before half time, and with a goalless second half, the match was drawn 1–1. The Soviet Union ended the round-robin tournament top of Group 4 and qualified for the quarter-finals.

The Soviet Union's opposition there were Yugoslavia, against whom they had won in the 1960 European Nations' Cup Final. The first match of the two-legged tie took place at the Crvena Zvezda Stadium in Belgrade on 30 April 1972. The Soviet Union adopted a very defensive approach to the game, although Eduard Kozynkevych's strike hit the Yugoslavia crossbar in the first half. After the interval, a combination of profligate finishing and numerous saves from the Soviet Union goalkeeper Yevhen Rudakov resulted in the game ending goalless. The second leg was held two weeks later at the Central Lenin Stadium. Played in warm and sunny conditions, Yugoslavia had the first chance to score but Mladen Ramljak's cross failed to be converted by any of his three teammates in the Soviet Union penalty area. After missing numerous opportunities to take the lead, the Soviet Union scored early in the second half when Kolotov took the ball past two defenders and struck the ball under Yugoslavia goalkeeper Enver Marić. Banishevskiy doubled his side's advantage in the 74th minute with a shot from inside the box, before Kozynkevych headed into an empty net after Marić had left his goal unattended. The Soviet Union won the match and the tie 3–0 to progress to the semi-final.

There, they faced Hungary with the match taking place at Émile Versé Stadium at the same time as the Belgium–West Germany game. As a result, it was attended by fewer than 2,000 people, as of 2020 the smallest crowd at a European Championship finals match. (Note: The attendance has been erroneously reported as 16,590, but the crowd was contemporaneously described by Vernon Leslie in the World Soccer magazine as "... about 32 Belgians at the start, 1,000 Hungarians, and the members of an obviously overstaffed Soviet embassy".) The pitch was saturated and first-half opportunities to score were limited to Sándor Zámbó's shot and an István Kocsis free kick both being saved by Rudakov. Eight minutes after half-time, the Soviet Union took the lead. Anatoly Baidachny won a corner and took it himself: the ball was headed cleared by Miklós Páncsics but fell to Anatoliy Konkov whose shot took a deflection off Péter Juhász and ended in the Hungary goal. Although Hungary had late chances to score, Zámbó's free kick was kept out by Rudakov and Július Szöke struck the rebound into the side netting. The match ended 1–0 and the Soviet Union progressed to their third final in four European Championships.

== Match ==
=== Pre-match ===
Between the quarter- and semi-finals, West Germany and the Soviet Union played a friendly at the Olympiastadion in Munich on 26 May 1972. After a goalless first half, the game ended 4–1 to West Germany with Müller scoring all of his side's goals while Kolotov scored the Soviet Union's consolation.

The referee for the final was Austrian Ferdinand Marschall. Byshovets was out injured for the Soviet Union with a problematic knee while West Germany's defender Berti Vogts was overlooked in favour of Höttges.

=== Summary ===
The final was played at Heysel Stadium on 18 June 1972 in front of 43,437 spectators. West Germany had several early chances to score: first Netzer passed to Müller but Rudakov came out to clear, then Jupp Heynckes saw his shot blocked by the Soviet Union defence before the ball fell to Müller whose shot was saved by Rudakov. Netzer then passed to Heynckes whose cross-shot was also kept out by Rudakov. Paul Breitner played a one-two with Hoeneß before striking across the goal and then Hoeneß himself struck the crossbar with a header from an Erwin Kremers cross. The deadlock was broken in the 27th minute: Franz Beckenbauer ran past two Soviet Union defenders with the ball before passing to Netzer whose dipping shot rebounded off the cross-bar. Yuriy Istomin's attempted headed clearance fell to Heynckes who half-volleyed the ball back into the box. It was pushed out by Rudakov but Müller scored from the rebound to make it 1–0.

Maier then tipped a 30-yard (27 m) strike from Revaz Dzodzuashvili over the West Germany crossbar in a rare opportunity for the Soviet Union, but Rudakov then saved a header from Heynckes before keeping out a Netzer free kick. In the 44th minute, Volodymyr Kaplychnyi fouled Netzer, who reacted to the challenge, and both were shown a yellow card. At half-time, the Soviet Union made one change to their side, with Oleg Dolmatov coming on as a substitute for Konkov. In the 52nd minute, Murtaz Khurtsilava lost possession of the ball to Wimmer who, after numerous West Germany passes, struck a left-footed shot past Rudakov to make it 2–0. Six minutes later, Schwarzenbeck ran into the Soviet Union penalty area with the ball before being tackled by Khurtsilava, but the ball fell to Müller who scored. Khurtsilava's shot from 30 yards (27 m) hit the West Germany crossbar, and after a brief pitch invasion, Marschall blew the final whistle. West Germany were 3–0 winners and secured the first European Championship title in their history.

=== Details ===
18 June 1972
16:00 CET

West Germany	3–0	Soviet Union
Müller 27', 58'; Wimmer 52'	Report

Heysel Stadium, Brussels
Attendance: 43,437
Referee: Ferdinand Marschall (Austria)

West Germany	Soviet Union

GK	1	Sepp Maier
SW	5	Franz Beckenbauer (c)
RB	2	Horst-Dieter Höttges
CB	4	Hans-Georg Schwarzenbeck
LB	3	Paul Breitner
DM	6	Herbert Wimmer
CM	8	Uli Hoeneß
CM	10	Günter Netzer	(yellow card) 44'
RW	9	Jupp Heynckes
LW	11	Erwin Kremers
CF	13	Gerd Müller
Manager:
Helmut Schön

GK	1	Yevhen Rudakov
RB	2	Revaz Dzodzuashvili
CB	3	Murtaz Khurtsilava (c)	(yellow card) 66'
CB	12	Volodymyr Kaplychnyi	(yellow card) 44'
LB	13	Yuriy Istomin
CM	7	Volodymyr Troshkin
CM	6	Viktor Kolotov
CM	14	Anatoliy Konkov		(substituted off) 46'
RW	8	Anatoly Baidachny
LW	18	Volodymyr Onyshchenko
CF	9	Anatoliy Banishevskiy		(substituted off) 66'
Substitutions:
MF	15	Oleg Dolmatov		(substituted on) 46'
FW	11	Eduard Kozynkevych		(substituted on) 66'
Manager:
Oleksandr Ponomarov

== Post-match ==
All but one of UEFA's team of the tournament had featured in the final, including seven West Germany and three Soviet Union players. The top three in the 1972 Ballon d'Or were also West Germany players: Beckenbauer won the title while Müller and Netzer shared the runner-up position. Belgium player Paul Van Himst who had faced West Germany in the semi-final suggested that they were "the best ever German team". Müller later noted that "we didn't fear the Russians in the final ... Everything worked well. The team worked, the coach worked, it was great. The team was on a roll and we won. That final was the best of the lot." With his four goals in the previous month's friendly, Müller had scored six times in two matches against the Soviet Union.

West Germany finished the next international tournament, the 1974 FIFA World Cup as champions, beating the Netherlands 2–1 in the 1974 FIFA World Cup Final. The Soviet Union failed to qualify for the finals of the 1974 World Cup when they refused to play the second leg of the UEFA–CONMEBOL play-off match against Chile in Santiago, following the 1973 coup d'état.

== See also ==
- Germany at the UEFA European Championship
- Soviet Union at the UEFA European Championship
