= André De Nul =

Belgian footballer (1946–2025)

- De Nul in 2020

Personal information
- Date of birth: 14 July 1946
- Place of birth: Lebbeke, Belgium
- Date of death: 3 November 2025 (aged 79)
- Place of death: Asse, Belgium
- Height: 1.75 m (5 ft 9 in)
- Position: Forward

Youth career
- 1960–1962: Eendracht Aalst

Senior career*
Years	Team	Apps	(Gls)
1962–1968	Eendracht Aalst	112	(63)
1968–1973	Lierse	133	(46)
1973–1975	Anderlecht	44	(14)
1975–1977	Union SG	54	(26)
1977–1978	Rot-Weiss Essen	7	(1)
1978–1984	FC Liedekerke		
1984–1985	VC Terheide		

International career
1971	Belgium	3	(2)
- * Club domestic league appearances and goals

André De Nul (14 July 1946 – 3 November 2025) was a Belgian footballer who played as a forward and made three appearances for the Belgium national team.

== Career ==
De Nul made his debut for Belgium on 3 February 1971 in a UEFA Euro 1972 qualifying match against Scotland, which finished as a 3–0 win. He went on to make three appearances in 1971, scoring two goals, but received no further call-ups.

== Death ==
De Nul died in Belgium on 3 November 2025, at the age of 79.

== Career statistics ==
Appearances and goals by national team and year
National team	Year	Apps	Goals
Belgium	1971	3	2
Total		3	2

Scores and results list Belgium's goal tally first, score column indicates score after each De Nul goal.

List of international goals scored by André De Nul
No.	Date	Venue	Opponent	Score	Result	Competition
1	17 February 1971	Stade Émile Versé, Anderlecht, Belgium	Portugal	3–0	3–0	UEFA Euro 1972 qualifying
2	20 May 1971	Stade Municipal, Luxembourg City, Luxembourg	Luxembourg	1–0	4–0	Friendly

== Honours ==
Lierse

- Belgian Cup: 1968–69

Anderlecht

- Belgian First Division: 1973–74
- Belgian Cup: 1974–75
- Belgian League Cup: 1973, 1974

Union Saint-Gilloise

- Belgian Third Division: 1975–76
