= Astrit Ziu =

Albanian footballer

Personal information
- Full name: Astrit Ziu
- Date of birth: 8 July 1946 (age 80)
- Place of birth: Berat, Albania
- Position: Defender

Youth career
- 1960–1963: Tomori Berat

Senior career*
Years	Team	Apps	(Gls)
1963–1966	Tomori		
1966–1978	Partizani		
1968–1969	→ Luftëtari (loan)		

International career
- Albania U21
1970–1972	Albania	6	(1)
- * Club domestic league appearances and goals

Astrit Ziu (born 8 July 1946) is an Albanian retired footballer who played as a left back and made six appearances for the Albania national team.

== Club career ==
Ziu started his career at hometown club Tomori Berat, before joining the military and thus army team Partizani Tirana in 1966. With Partizani he won a league title and 3 domestic cups. He also had a season on loan with Luftëtari. He has played at leftback for club and country but also in any other position except between the goalposts.

== International career ==
Ziu made his debut for Albania on 13 December 1970 in a UEFA Euro 1972 qualifying match against Turkey, in which he scored Albania's only goal in the 1–2 loss. He went on to make six appearances, scoring one goal, before making his last appearance on 21 June 1972 in a 1974 FIFA World Cup qualification match against Finland, which finished as a 0–1 loss.

== Career statistics ==
=== International ===
Albania
Year	Apps	Goals
1970	1	1
1971	4	0
1972	1	0
Total	6	1

=== International goals ===
No.	Date	Venue	Opponent	Score	Result	Competition
1	13 December 1970	İnönü Stadium, Istanbul, Turkey	Turkey	1–1	1–2	UEFA Euro 1972 qualifying

== Personal life ==
Ziu has a son and a daughter and he has lived 12 years in Barcelona, Spain, before returning to Albania. After his playing career he worked as a sports instructor in the army and for the military press. He also was chief at Partizani and works as a coach for UD Vista Alegre Castelldefels during his years in Spain.

== Honours ==
- Albanian Superliga: 1

1971

- Albanian Cup: 3

1968, 1970, 1973
