= UEFA Euro 1972 qualifying Group 8 =

Football tournament qualification stage

Group 8 of the UEFA Euro 1972 qualifying tournament was one of the eight groups to decide which teams would qualify for the UEFA Euro 1972 finals tournament. Group 8 consisted of four teams: West Germany, Poland, Turkey, and Albania, where they played against each other home-and-away in a round-robin format. The group winners were West Germany, who finished four points above the Poland.

== Final table ==
Pos	Team	Pld	W	D	L	GF	GA	GD	Pts	Qualification	(West Germany)	(Poland)	(Turkey)	(Albania)
1	West Germany	6	4	2	0	10	2	+8	10	Advance to quarter-finals	—	0–0	1–1	2–0
2	Poland	6	2	2	2	10	6	+4	6		1–3	—	5–1	3–0
3	Turkey	6	2	1	3	5	13	−8	5		0–3	1–0	—	2–1
4	Albania	6	1	1	4	5	9	−4	3		0–1	1–1	3–0	—

Source: UEFA
Rules for classification: Qualification tiebreakers

== Matches ==
14 October 1970
17:30

Poland	3–0	Albania
Gadocha 19'; Lubański 83'; Szołtysik 90'	Report

Stadion Śląski, Chorzów
Attendance: 12,260
Referee: Andreas Kouniaides (Cyprus)

17 October 1970
15:30

West Germany	1–1	Turkey
Müller 37' (pen.)	Report	Yavuz 15'

Müngersdorfer Stadion, Cologne
Attendance: 52,204
Referee: Paul Bonett (Malta)

13 December 1970
00:00

Turkey	2–1	Albania
Kurt 4'; Turan 43'	Report	Ziu 22'

İnönü Stadı, Istanbul
Attendance: 39,000
Referee: János Biróczky (Hungary)

17 February 1971
14:30

Albania	0–1	West Germany
	Report	Müller 38'

Stadiumi Qemal Stafa, Tirana
Attendance: 38,082
Referee: Todor Bechirov (Bulgaria)

25 April 1971
15:00

Turkey	0–3	West Germany
	Report	Müller 43', 47'; Köppel 73'

İnönü Stadı, Istanbul
Attendance: 38,097
Referee: Karlo Kruashvili (USSR)

12 May 1971
16:00

Albania	1–1	Poland
Zhega 31'	Report	Banaś 6'

Stadiumi Qemal Stafa, Tirana
Attendance: 28,182
Referee: Robert Héliès (France)

12 June 1971
15:30

West Germany	2–0	Albania
Netzer 17'; Grabowski 45'	Report

Wildparkstadion, Karlsruhe
Attendance: 44,833
Referee: Timoleon Latsios (Greece)

22 September 1971
15:15

Poland	5–1	Turkey
Bula 32'; Lubański 62', 73', 90'; Gadocha 69'	Report	Yayöz 83'

Stadion Wisła, Kraków
Attendance: 20,241
Referee: Antoine Queudeville (Luxembourg)

10 October 1971
12:00

Poland	1–3	West Germany
Gadocha 27'	Report	Müller 29', 64'; Grabowski 70'

Stadion Dziesięciolecia, Warsaw
Attendance: 63,300
Referee: Ferdinand Marschall (Austria)

14 November 1971
14:00

Albania	3–0	Turkey
Përnaska 22', 53'; Pano 64'	Report

Stadiumi Qemal Stafa, Tirana
Attendance: 38,159
Referee: Iván Pláček (Czechoslovakia)

17 November 1971
15:00

West Germany	0–0	Poland
	Report

Volksparkstadion, Hamburg
Attendance: 60,448
Referee: William Mullan (Scotland)

5 December 1971
14:30

Turkey	1–0	Poland
Turan 52'	Report

Atatürk Stadı, İzmir
Attendance: 57,794
Referee: Petar Nikolov (Bulgaria)

== Goalscorers ==
There were 30 goals scored in 12 matches, for an average of 2.5 goals per match.

6 goals

- (Germany national football team) Gerd Müller

4 goals

- (Poland national football team) Włodzimierz Lubański

3 goals

- (Poland national football team) Robert Gadocha

2 goals

- (Albania national football team) Ilir Përnaska
- (Turkey national football team) Cemil Turan
- (Germany national football team) Jürgen Grabowski

1 goal

- (Albania national football team) Panajot Pano
- (Albania national football team) Medin Zhega
- (Albania national football team) Astrit Ziu
- (Poland national football team) Jan Banaś
- (Poland national football team) Bronisław Bula
- (Poland national football team) Zygfryd Szołtysik
- (Turkey national football team) Metin Kurt
- (Turkey national football team) Kamuran Yavuz
- (Turkey national football team) Nihat Yayöz
- (Germany national football team) Horst Köppel
- (Germany national football team) Günter Netzer
