= Jacinto João =

Portuguese footballer (1944–2004)

Personal information
- Date of birth: 25 January 1944
- Place of birth: Luanda, Portuguese Angola, Portuguese Empire
- Date of death: 29 October 2004 (aged 60)
- Place of death: Setúbal, Portugal
- Position: Left winger

Senior career*
Years	Team	Apps	(Gls)
1963–1965	FC Luanda		
1965–1979	Vitória de Setúbal	268	(66)
1975	→ Portuguesa (loan)	6	(0)
1979–1980	Fafe	25	(2)
1980–1981	Caldas	16	(3)

International career
1968–1974	Portugal	10	(2)
- * Club domestic league appearances and goals

Jacinto João (25 January 1944 – 29 October 2004), also known as J. J., was a Portuguese footballer who played as a left winger.

Jacinto João won 10 caps for the Portugal national team, scoring two goals. His debut was on 27 October 1968, in a 3–0 win over Romania in a World Cup qualifying match, when he came on as substitute for António Simões, and scored a goal. He was not included in the team that played at the Independence Brazil Cup, in 1972. His last game for Portugal was on 3 April 1974, in a 0–0 draw with England in Lisbon, in a friendly match.

He played for 14 seasons for Vitória de Setúbal, scoring 66 goals in 268 games, helping them to 2nd place in the Portuguese league in 1971/72. He was one of the few great Portuguese football players of his generation who never played for Benfica, Sporting Lisbon or Porto. After retiring from activity he remained working for his club's Technical Staff. He died on 29 October 2004, of a fourth and fatal heart attack. Vitória de Setúbal erected a statue in his honour.

Jacinto João shared a birthday with his contemporary football legend Eusébio, 25 January.

== Career statistics ==
Scores and results list Portugal's goal tally first, score column indicates score after each Jacinto João goal.

List of international goals scored by Jacinto João
No.	Date	Venue	Opponent	Score	Result	Competition
1	27 October 1968	Estádio Nacional, Lisbon, Portugal	Romania	2–0	3–0	1970 World Cup qualification
2	14 October 1970	Idrætsparken, Copenhagen, Denmark	Denmark	1–0	1–0	Euro 1972 qualifying
