= Anton Weibel =

Swiss footballer (born 1941)

Personal information
- Full name: Anton Weibel
- Date of birth: 8 September 1941 (age 85)
- Place of birth: Flawil, Switzerland
- Height: 1.76 m (5 ft 9 in)
- Position: Defender

Senior career*
Years	Team	Apps	(Gls)
1961–1962	Grasshopper		
1962–1966	SC Brühl		
1966–1971	Lausanne-Sport		
1971–1973	Sion	41	(1)
1973–1976	St. Gallen		

International career
1969–1972	Switzerland	13	(0)
- * Club domestic league appearances and goals

Anton Weibel (born 8 September 1941) is a Swiss former footballer who played as a defender and made 13 appearances for the Switzerland national team.

== Career ==
Weibel made his debut for Switzerland on 24 September 1969 in a friendly match against Turkey, which finished as a 0–3 loss. He went on to make 13 appearances before making his last appearance on 4 October 1972 in a friendly match against Denmark, which finished as a 1–1 draw.

== Career statistics ==
=== International ===
Switzerland
Year	Apps	Goals
1969	1	0
1970	6	0
1971	5	0
1972	1	0
Total	13	0
