= László Branikovits =

Hungarian footballer (1949–2020)

Personal information
- Date of birth: 18 December 1949
- Place of birth: Budapest, Hungary
- Date of death: 16 October 2020 (aged 70)
- Position: Forward

International career
Years	Team	Apps	(Gls)
1972–1975	Hungary	6	(2)

László Branikovits (18 December 1949 – 16 October 2020) was a Hungarian footballer. He competed in the men's tournament at the 1972 Summer Olympics.

Branikovits died on 16 October 2020 at the age of 70.
