= Charly Loubet =

French footballer (1946–2023)

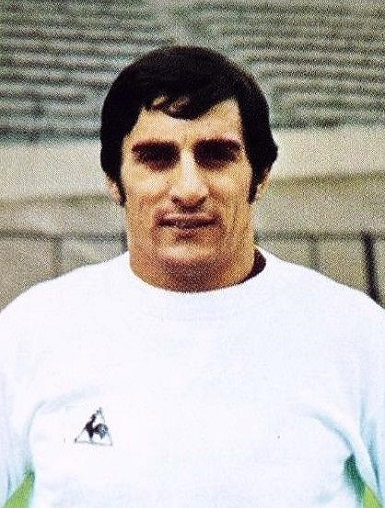
- Loubet with Marseille in 1970

Personal information
- Date of birth: 26 January 1946
- Place of birth: Grasse, France
- Date of death: 30 January 2023 (aged 77)
- Place of death: Grasse, France
- Height: 1.74 m (5 ft 9 in)
- Position: Striker

Senior career*
Years	Team	Apps	(Gls)
1962–1963	Cannes	20	(5)
1963–1964	Stade Français	22	(5)
1964–1969	Nice	153	(49)
1969–1971	Marseille	65	(31)
1971–1975	Nice	120	(28)
1975–1981	Cannes	175	(34)
Total		555	(152)

International career
1967–1974	France	36	(10)

Managerial career
- 1980–1982: Cannes
- * Club domestic league appearances and goals

Charly Loubet (26 January 1946 – 30 January 2023) was a French footballer who played as a striker. In 1962, he became the youngest professional football player in France by signing with AS Cannes. After that, he played all his career in France, playing for Stade Français, two spells at OGC Nice and Olympique Marseille before returning to AS Cannes, where he became coach. He earned 36 caps for France in the 1970s, scoring 10 goals.

Loubet died on 30 January 2023, at the age of 77.

== Honours ==
Marseille

- Division 1: 1970–71
