= Ferdinand Marschall =

Austrian football referee

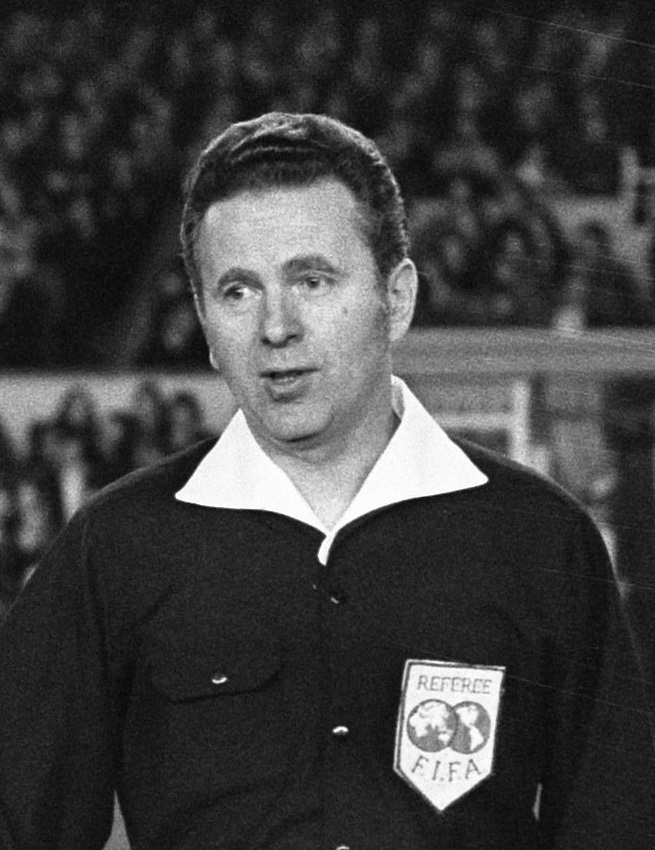
- Marschall in 1972
- Born: 19 February 1924; Timișoara, Romania
- Died: 14 November 2006 (aged 82); Waldzell, Austria

Domestic
Years	League	Role
1953–1974	Austrian football championship	Referee

International
Years	League	Role
1967–1974	FIFA listed	Referee

Ferdinand Marschall (19 February 1924 – 14 November 2006) was an Austrian football referee.

== Refereeing career ==
In 1953 Marschall became a referee in the Austrian football championship, and in 1967 he was appointed as a FIFA referee.

Marschall was chosen as a referee for the 1970 FIFA World Cup, where he officiated a group stage match between Brazil and Romania.

In 1972, Marschall was chosen as a referee for UEFA Euro 1972, where he officiated the final between West Germany and the Soviet Union.

Marschall retired from refereeing in 1974 after officiating for 21 years in the Austrian top flight.
