= Bernard Blanchet =

French footballer (born 1943)

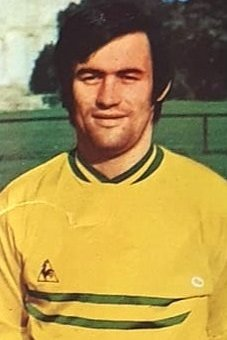

Personal information
- Date of birth: 1 December 1943 (age 82)
- Place of birth: Saint-Mars-la-Jaille, France
- Position: Striker

Senior career*
Years	Team	Apps	(Gls)
1963–1974	FC Nantes	356	(111)
1974–1976	Stade Lavallois	63	(22)

International career
1966–1972	France	17	(5)
- * Club domestic league appearances and goals

Bernard Blanchet (French: [bɛʁnaʁ blɑ̃ʃɛ]; born 1 December 1943 in Saint-Mars-la-Jaille) is a former professional French football player.
