= Kostas Aidiniou =

Greek footballer

Personal information
- Full name: Konstantinos Aidiniou
- Date of birth: 2 February 1948 (age 78)
- Place of birth: Psarades, Florina Greece
- Position: Attacking midfielder

Youth career
- 1963–1965: Iraklis

Senior career*
Years	Team	Apps	(Gls)
1965–1974	Iraklis	219	(57)
1974–1978	Olympiacos	40	(7)
1978–1979	Iraklis	13	(0)

International career^{‡}
1968–1974	Greece	7	(3)

Managerial career
- 1987: Iraklis
- * Club domestic league appearances and goals as of 8 February 2014 ‡ National team caps and goals as of 8 February 2014

Kostas Aidiniou (Greek: Κώστας Αϊδινίου; born 2 February 1948) is a Greek former professional footballer who played as an attacking midfielder.

== Club career ==
Aidiniou was born on 2 February 1948 in Psarades. Although he was a track and field athlete, he was talked into signing for Iraklis by two teachers of him, themselves fans of the club. After joining the youth ranks of Iraklis in 1963, Aidiniou made his first team debut in 1965, scoring against Olympiacos in a 2–1 away defeat of Iraklis. Aidiniou was the star player of Iraklis until 1974, when he signed for Olympiacos for 11,000,000 drachmas.

Aidiniou could not compete for the 1974–75 season as his transfer was considered overdue. For the whole season he only contested in friendly matches and training courses and that humped his adaptation to his new club. In Olympiacos Aidiniou failed to demonstrate the same level of football as he did in Iraklis and he was released from Olympiacos after the 1977–78 season. Aidiniou appeared in a total of 40 league matches for Olympiacos, scoring 7 goals.

Aidiniou returned to Iraklis for the 1978–79 season appearing in 13 matches and failing to score any goals. He retired after that season, aged 31. In his two spells with Iraklis Aidiniou totalled 232 appearances and 57 goals.

== International career ==
Aidiniou scored in his debut for Greece in a 4–1 win against Egypt in Athens. His last match for Greece came on 15 May 1974, under Alketas Panagoulias, in a friendly match against Poland. Aidiniou appeared in seven matches of Greece, managing to score three goals.

== Managerial career ==
Aidiniou had a stint as Iraklis' manager together with Giorgos Koudas in 1987. He has also held several positions in the club's technical staff.

== Outside football ==
Aidiniou wanted to become a doctor, before deciding to stick at football. After retiring from football he was involved in "Iraklis Former Footballer's Club" becoming its president.
