= Geir Karlsen (footballer) =

Norwegian footballer (1948–2024)

Personal information
- Full name: Geir Sigurd Karlsen
- Date of birth: 18 September 1948
- Place of birth: Skien, Norway
- Date of death: 26 July 2024 (aged 75)
- Height: 1.92 m (6 ft 4 in)
- Position: Goalkeeper

Senior career*
| Years | Team | Apps | (Gls) |
| 1966–1969 | Odd | 63 | (0) |
| 1970–1973 | Rosenborg | 76 | (0) |
| 1973–1975 | Dunfermline | 55 | (0) |
| 1975–1979 | Vålerengen | 68 | (0) |
| 1980–1983 | Odd | 75 | (0) |

International career
| 1966–1971 | Norway U21 | 13 | (0) |
| 1969–1977 | Norway | 32 | (0) |

Managerial career
- 1984: Odd
- * Club domestic league appearances and goals

Geir Sigurd Karlsen (18 September 1948 – 26 July 2024) was a Norwegian footballer who played as a goalkeeper.

Karlsen's first club was Skidar, a local club in Skien, Norway. He made his debut for Odd in 1966, and stayed there until he joined Rosenborg BK in 1970. While at Rosenborg, he won the Norwegian league and cup double in 1971.

He won one cap with Norway while playing for Odd, and was capped 32 times in total. In 1980, he returned to Odd after spells with Dunfermline Athletic and Vålerengen.

Karlsen retired as a player in 1984. He died from cancer on 26 July 2024, at the age of 75.
