= Michel Mézy =

French football player and manager (born 1948)

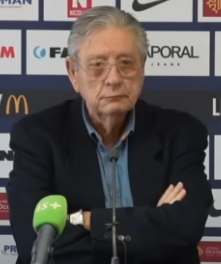
- Mézy in 2024

Personal information
- Full name: Szakács Márton Mézy
- Date of birth: 15 August 1948 (age 78)
- Place of birth: Aigues-Mortes, France
- Height: 1.75 m (5 ft 9 in)
- Position: Midfielder

Senior career*
Years	Team	Apps	(Gls)
1965–1975	Nîmes	248	(17)
1975–1977	Lille	61	(5)
1977–1979	Nîmes	71	(3)
1979–1982	Montpellier	78	(1)
Total		458	(26)

International career
1970–1973	France	17	(1)

Managerial career
- 1990: Montpellier
- 1992–1994: Nîmes
- 1994–1998: Montpellier
- 1999–2002: Montpellier
- * Club domestic league appearances and goals

Michel Mézy (born 15 August 1948) is a French former professional football player and manager.

== Honours ==
=== Manager ===
Montpellier

- Division 2: 1986–87
- Coupe de France: 1989–90
- UEFA Intertoto Cup runner-up: 1997
