= Finn Laudrup =

Danish footballer (born 1945)

Personal information
- Full name: Finn Laudrup
- Date of birth: 31 July 1945 (age 81)
- Place of birth: Frederiksberg, Denmark
- Position: Forward

Senior career*
Years	Team	Apps	(Gls)
1962–1967	Vanløse		
1968–1970	Wiener Sportclub		
1970–1972	Brønshøj		
1973–1975	Brøndby		
1976–1980	KB		
1981	Brøndby		

International career
1965	Denmark U21	1	(0)
1967–1979	Denmark	19	(6)

Managerial career
- 1973: Brøndby
- * Club domestic league appearances and goals

Finn Laudrup (born 31 July 1945) is a Danish former association football player who played as a forward. He represented a number of Danish clubs and played professionally with Wiener Sport-Club in Austria. He played 19 matches and scored six goals for the Denmark national football team. He is the father of former Denmark national team players Michael Laudrup and Brian Laudrup.

== Club career ==
On club level, Finn Laudrup started at Vanløse in 1962 before he moved abroad to play professionally in Austria with Wiener Sportclub in 1968. He returned to the top-flight Danish 1st Division in 1971 for Brønshøj, before he moved a few leagues lower to become player/coach for the small-time club Brøndby in 1973. He went back to the 1st Division with KB in 1976, but would return to Brøndby in 1981, now in Danish 2nd Division. He played the 1981 season which ended in promotion for Brøndby. Before the 1982 season, Finn retired from football.

== International career ==
Laudrup made his debut for the Danish national team on 24 May 1967, in a 2–0 against Hungary. He played seven more games that year, scoring four goals. As a professional, he was banned from the amateur-only national team. When he returned to Denmark, he went on to play a further ten games from May 1971 to November 1972. His final cap came several years later, when Denmark lost 2–1 against the Soviet Union in June 1979. In all, Finn Laudrup played 19 games and scored six goals for Denmark.
