= Jacques Vergnes =

French footballer (1948–2025)

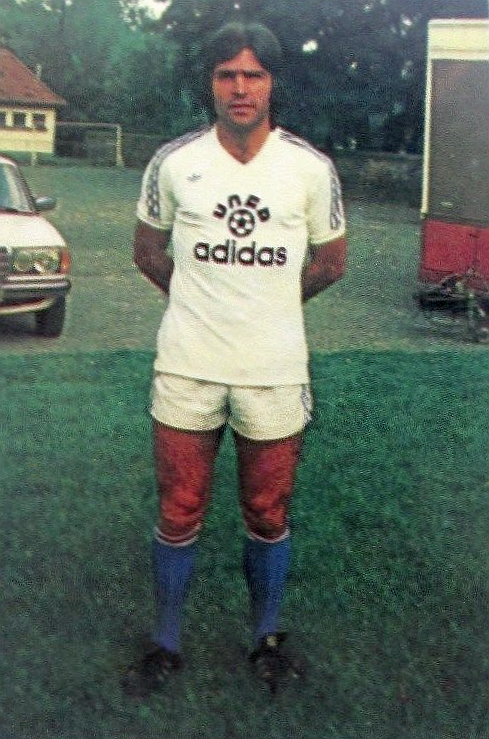
- Vergnes with Strasbourg in 1978

Personal information
- Date of birth: 21 July 1948
- Place of birth: Magalas, France
- Date of death: 28 June 2025 (aged 76)
- Position: Striker

Senior career*
Years	Team	Apps	(Gls)
1967–1968	Montpellier	34	(8)
1968–1970	Red Star	41	(11)
1970–1974	Nîmes	118	(72)
1974–1975	Bastia	46	(20)
1975–1976	Reims	26	(11)
1976–1977	Laval	36	(19)
1977–1978	Strasbourg	37	(12)
1978–1979	Bordeaux	20	(8)
1979–1982	Montpellier	63	(33)

International career
1971	France	1	(1)
- * Club domestic league appearances and goals

Jacques Vergnes (French: [ʒak vɛʁɲ]; 21 July 1948 – 28 June 2025) was a French professional footballer who played as a striker. He made one appearance for the France national team in 1971, scoring in that one match. Vergnes died on 28 June 2025, at the age of 76.
