= UEFA Euro 1972 quarter-finals =

Football qualifying competition

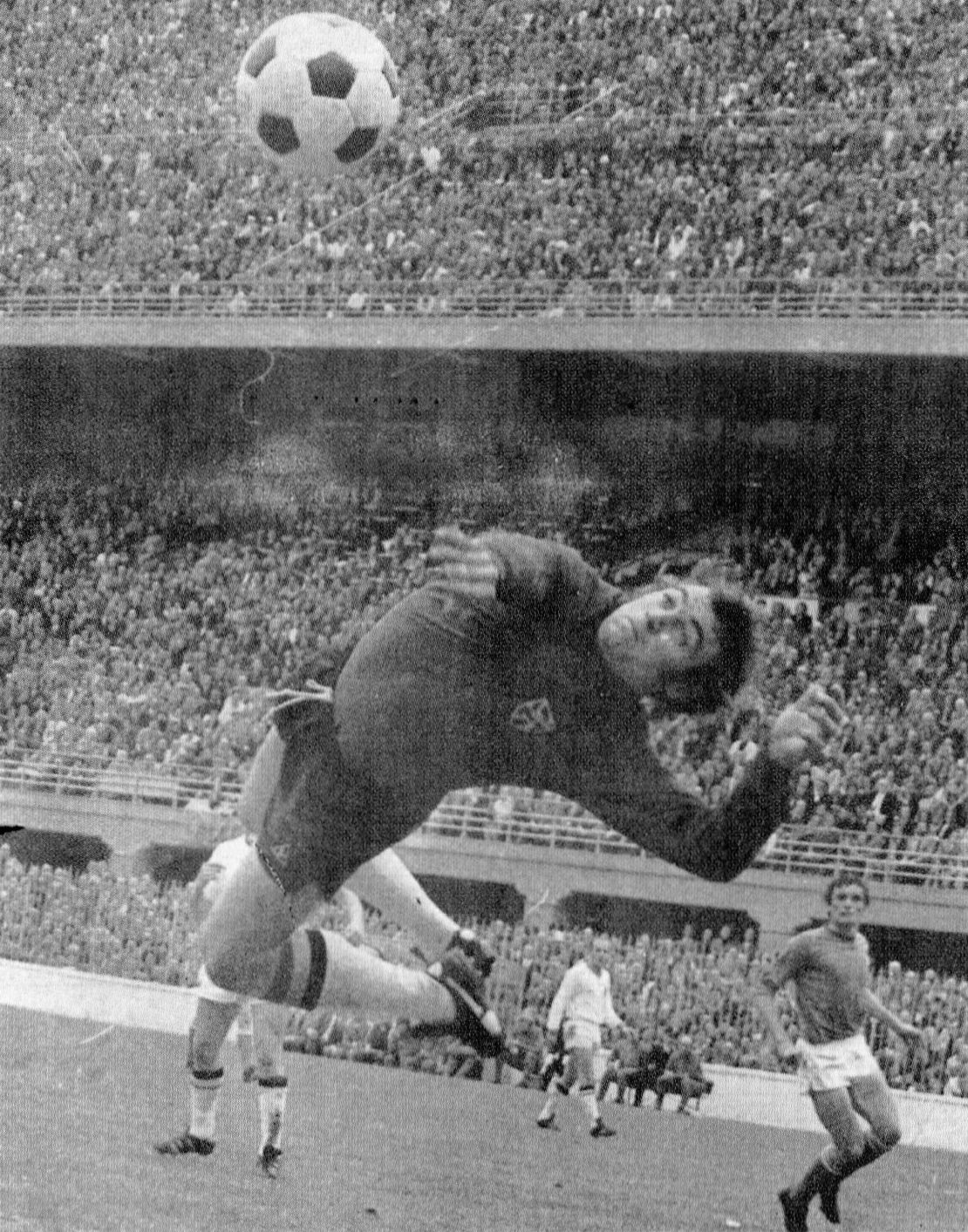
Belgian goalkeeper Christian Piot (on foreground) saves on Italian forward Gigi Riva (on background). Milan, April 29, 1972.

The UEFA Euro 1972 quarter-finals was the last round of qualifying competition for UEFA Euro 1972. They were contested by the eight group winners of the qualifying tournament. The winners of each of four home-and-away ties qualified for the finals tournament in Belgium. The matches were played on 29–30 April and 13–14 May 1972, with a replay on 17 May 1972.

== Qualification ==
Each group winner progressed to the quarter-finals. The quarter-finals were played in two legs on a home-and-away basis. The winners of the quarter-finals would go through to the final tournament.

== Summary ==
Team 1	Agg.	Team 2	1st leg	2nd leg	Play-off
Italy	1–2	Belgium	0–0	1–2	
Hungary	5–4	Romania	1–1	2–2	2–1
England	1–3	West Germany	1–3	0–0	
Yugoslavia	0–3	Soviet Union	0–0	0–3	

== Matches ==
The eight matches took place over two legs, the first being on 29 and 30 April 1972, and the second on 13 and 14 May 1972. A third leg would be played for any matches tied on aggregate after the second leg. All times are CET (UTC+1).

29 April 1972
15:30

Italy	0–0	Belgium
	Report

San Siro, Milan
Attendance: 63,549
Referee: Petar Nikolov (Bulgaria)
13 May 1972
20:00

Belgium	2–1	Italy
Van Moer 23'; Van Himst 71'	Report	Riva 86' (pen.)

Stade Émile Versé, Brussels
Attendance: 26,561
Referee: Paul Schiller (Austria)

Belgium won 2–1 on aggregate and qualified for UEFA Euro 1972.

29 April 1972
17:00

Hungary	1–1	Romania
Branikovits 11'	Report	Sătmăreanu 56'

Népstadion, Budapest
Attendance: 68,446
Referee: David William Smith (England)
14 May 1972
16:00

Romania	2–2	Hungary
Dobrin 14'; Neagu 81'	Report	Szőke 5'; Kocsis 36'

Stadionul 23 August, Bucharest
Attendance: 60,254
Referee: Kurt Tschenscher (West Germany)

3–3 on aggregate. A replay was played on a neutral ground to determine the winner.

17 May 1972
20:00

Hungary	2–1	Romania
Kocsis 27'; Szőke 89'	Report	Neagu 34'

Stadion JNA, Belgrade
Attendance: 32,130
Referee: Christos Michas (Greece)

Hungary won 5–4 on aggregate and qualified for UEFA Euro 1972.

29 April 1972
20:45

England	1–3	West Germany
Lee 78'	Report	Hoeneß 21'; Netzer 84' (pen.); Müller 88'

Wembley Stadium, London
Attendance: 96,766
Referee: Robert Héliès (France)
13 May 1972
16:00

West Germany	0–0	England
	Report

Olympiastadion, West Berlin
Attendance: 76,122
Referee: Milivoje Gugulović (Yugoslavia)

West Germany won 3–1 on aggregate and qualified for UEFA Euro 1972.

30 April 1972
16:00

Yugoslavia	0–0	Soviet Union
	Report

Stadion Crvena zvezda, Belgrade
Attendance: 58,312
Referee: Rudolf Scheurer (Switzerland)
13 May 1972
15:00

Soviet Union	3–0	Yugoslavia
Kolotov 53'; Banishevskiy 74'; Kozynkevych 90'	Report

Central Lenin Stadium, Moscow
Attendance: 90,263
Referee: Aurelio Angonese (Italy)

Soviet Union won 3–0 on aggregate and qualified for UEFA Euro 1972.

== Goalscorers ==
There were 19 goals scored in 9 matches, for an average of 2.11 goals per match.

2 goals

- (Hungary national football team) Lajos Kocsis
- (Hungary national football team) István Szőke
- (Romania national football team) Alexandru Neagu

1 goal

- (Belgium national football team) Paul Van Himst
- (Belgium national football team) Wilfried Van Moer
- (England national football team) Francis Lee
- (Hungary national football team) László Branikovits
- (Italy national football team) Luigi Riva
- (Romania national football team) Nicolae Dobrin
- (Romania national football team) Lajos Sătmăreanu
- (Soviet Union national football team) Anatoliy Banishevskiy
- (Soviet Union national football team) Viktor Kolotov
- (Soviet Union national football team) Eduard Kozynkevych
- (Germany national football team) Uli Hoeneß
- (Germany national football team) Gerd Müller
- (Germany national football team) Günter Netzer
