= Lajos Kocsis =

Hungarian footballer

Personal information
- Date of birth: 18 June 1947
- Place of birth: Szeged, Hungary
- Date of death: 9 October 2000 (aged 53)
- Place of death: Budapest, Hungary

Senior career*
Years	Team	Apps	(Gls)
1967–1977	Bp. Honvéd SE	263	(91)

International career
1969–1975	Hungary	33	(7)
Medal record
Olympic medal record
Representing Hungary
Men's football
Gold medal – first place	1968 Mexico City	Team competition
Silver medal – second place	1972 Munich	Team competition
- * Club domestic league appearances and goals

Lajos Kocsis (18 June 1947 in Szeged – 9 October 2000 in Budapest) was a Hungarian football midfielder, who played for Bp. Honvéd SE. He was an Olympic champion in 1968.

== Club career ==
Kocsis started his career in his native town of Szeged, with third-division Szegedi VSE. Lajos became a first-division player in 1966, having been transferred to then first division Salgótarjáni BTC. A year later, he moved to Budapest to play for Honvéd, where he spent ten years and became one of Hungary's best-known and most popular football players.

Kocsis was considered as Hungary's most talented footballer since Ferenc Puskás, some stating he was even more talented than his famous predecessor. Yet he failed to fulfill the expectations of both fans and experts because of his flamboyant lifestyle (including frequent and hard drinking), which ultimately led to his expulsion from Honvéd in 1977, despite having been one of the most popular characters in Hungarian football, adored both for his high technical skills and good sense of humor. He was particularly feared by his adversaries for his free-kicks and unpredictable, Garrincha-type dribbling.

He scored one of his most memorable goals at Vienna's Prater Stadium in a 1974 World Cup qualification match against Austria on 15 October 1972. In 1975, he was elected Hungarian footballer of the year. Following the end of his stay at Honvéd, he played for second-division Gyulai SE.

== International career ==
Kocsis won a gold medal at the 1968 Summer Olympics and a silver medal at the 1972 Summer Olympics, and also participated in the final tournament of the 1972 UEFA European Championship in Belgium. He earned 33 caps and scored 7 goals for the Hungary national football team.

== Personal life ==
His son Lajos Kocsis Jr. was also a football player but had a much less outstanding career, mostly playing for lower division teams.
