= Eduard Kozynkevych =

Ukrainian Soviet footballer

Personal information
- Full name: Eduard Teodorovych Kozynkevych
- Date of birth: 23 May 1949
- Place of birth: Lviv, Ukrainian SSR
- Date of death: 16 November 1994 (aged 45)
- Place of death: Lviv, Ukraine
- Height: 1.82 m (6 ft 0 in)
- Position: Striker

Youth career
- SKA Lviv

Senior career*
Years	Team	Apps	(Gls)
1967–1969	SKA Lviv	73	(13)
1970–1971	FC Shakhtar Donetsk	58	(17)
1972–1974	FC Karpaty Lviv	77	(14)
1975	FC Dynamo Moscow	4	(0)
1976–1978	FC Karpaty Lviv	58	(4)
Total		270	(48)

International career
1972	USSR	6	(1)

Managerial career
- SKA Lviv (youth teams)
- Philadelphia Tryzub
Medal record
Men's football
Representing USSR
UEFA European Championship
Silver medal – second place	1972 Belgium
- * Club domestic league appearances and goals

Eduard Teodorovych Kozynkevych (Ukrainian: Едуард Теодорович Козинкевич, Russian: Эдуард Теодорович Козинкевич; born 23 May 1949; died 16 November 1994) was a Ukrainian footballer.

== International career ==
He earned 6 caps for the USSR national football team, and participated in UEFA Euro 1972.
