= Péter Juhász (footballer) =

Hungarian footballer (1948–2024)

Personal information
- Date of birth: 3 August 1948
- Place of birth: Lučenec, Czechoslovakia
- Date of death: 29 March 2024 (aged 75)
- Place of death: Budapest, Hungary
- Position: Left-back

Senior career*
Years	Team	Apps	(Gls)
1968–1976	Újpesti Dózsa		
1976–1978	Tatabanyai Banyasz		
1979–1982	Borsodi Volán SC		

International career
1971–1973	Hungary	24	(1)
Medal record
Representing Hungary
Men's football
Silver medal – second place	1972 Munich	Team competition
- * Club domestic league appearances and goals

Péter Juhász (3 August 1948 – 29 March 2024) was a Hungarian footballer who played as a left-back for Újpesti Dózsa.

He won a silver medal in football at the 1972 Summer Olympics, and also participated in UEFA Euro 1972 for the Hungary national football team.

Born in Lučenec, Czechoslovakia on 3 August 1948, he died in Budapest on 29 March 2024, at the age of 75.
