= 1974 FC Dynamo Kyiv season =

Dynamo Kyiv
1974 season
- Head coach: Valeriy Lobanovskyi
- Stadium: Central Stadium
- Soviet Top League: 1st
- Soviet Cup: Winners
- European Cup Winners' Cup: Winners
- Top goalscorer: League: Oleg Blokhin (20); All: Oleg Blokhin (28)
| Home colours | Away colours | Goalkeeper colours |

The 1974 season was the 43rd season in the existence of FC Dynamo Kyiv and the club's 37th consecutive season in the top flight of Football in the Soviet Union. In addition to the domestic league, Dynamo Kyiv participated in this season's editions of the Soviet Cup and the European Cup Winners' Cup.

== Squad ==
Squad at end of season

Note: Flags indicate national team as defined under FIFA eligibility rules; some limited exceptions apply. Players may hold more than one non-FIFA nationality.

| No. | Pos. | Nation | Player |
|---|---|---|---|
| — | GK | URS | Yevhen Rudakov |
| — | GK | URS | Valeriy Samokhin |
| — | DF | URS | Aleksandr Damin |
| — | DF | URS | Mykhaylo Fomenko |
| — | DF | URS | Sergey Kuznetsov |
| — | DF | URS | Volodymyr Lozynskyi |
| — | DF | URS | Viktor Matviyenko |
| — | DF | URS | Stefan Reshko |
| — | DF | URS | Volodymyr Troshkin |
| — | DF | URS | Valeriy Zuyev |
| — | MF | URS | Oleksandr Boyko |
| — | MF | URS | Leonid Buryak |

| No. | Pos. | Nation | Player |
|---|---|---|---|
| — | MF | URS | Viktor Kolotov |
| — | MF | URS | Anatoliy Konkov |
| — | MF | URS | Volodymyr Muntyan |
| — | MF | URS | Oleg Serebryanskiy |
| — | MF | URS | Volodymyr Veremeyev |
| — | MF | URS | Yuriy Kovalyov |
| — | FW | URS | Oleg Blokhin |
| — | FW | URS | Viacheslav Kochubinski |
| — | FW | URS | Volodymyr Onyshchenko |
| — | FW | URS | Vitaliy Shevchenko |
| — | FW | URS | Petro Slobodyan |
| — | FW | URS | Anatoliy Shepel |

== Competitions ==
=== Overall record ===
| Competition | First match | Last match | Starting round | Final position | Record | | | | | | | |
| Competition | First match | Last match | Starting round | Final position | Pld | W | D | L | GF | GA | GD | Win % |
|---|---|---|---|---|---|---|---|---|---|---|---|---|
| Soviet Top League | 12 April 1974 | 17 November 1974 | Matchday 1 | Winners | 30 | 14 | 12 | 4 | 49 | 24 | +25 | 46.67 |
| Soviet Cup | 15 June 1974 | 10 August 1974 | Quarter-finals | Winners | 5 | 4 | 1 | 0 | 9 | 3 | +6 | 80.00 |
| European Cup Winners' Cup | 18 September 1974 | 14 May 1975 | First round | Winners | 9 | 8 | 0 | 1 | 17 | 5 | +12 | 88.89 |
| Total | | | | | 44 | 26 | 13 | 5 | 75 | 32 | +43 | 59.09 |

Source: Competitions

=== Soviet Top League ===
| Pos | Team | Pld | W | D | L | GF | GA | GD | Pts | Qualification or relegation |
|---|---|---|---|---|---|---|---|---|---|---|
| 1 | (Ukrainian Soviet Socialist Republic) Dynamo Kyiv (C) | 30 | 14 | 12 | 4 | 49 | 24 | +25 | 40 | Qualification for European Cup first round |
| 2 | (Russian Soviet Federative Socialist Republic) Spartak Moscow | 30 | 15 | 9 | 6 | 41 | 23 | +18 | 39 | Qualification for UEFA Cup first round |
| 3 | (Ukrainian Soviet Socialist Republic) Chornomorets Odesa | 30 | 12 | 11 | 7 | 35 | 31 | +4 | 35 | Qualification for UEFA Cup first round |
| 4 | (Russian Soviet Federative Socialist Republic) Torpedo Moscow | 30 | 13 | 7 | 10 | 35 | 28 | +7 | 33 | |
| 5 | (Armenian Soviet Socialist Republic) Ararat Yerevan | 30 | 11 | 10 | 9 | 37 | 28 | +9 | 32 | Qualification for Cup Winners' Cup first round |
| 6 | (Russian Soviet Federative Socialist Republic) Dynamo Moscow | 30 | 10 | 11 | 9 | 42 | 33 | +9 | 31 | |
| 7 | (Russian Soviet Federative Socialist Republic) Zenit Leningrad | 30 | 8 | 15 | 7 | 36 | 41 | −5 | 31 | |
| 8 | (Uzbek Soviet Socialist Republic) Pakhtakor Tashkent | 30 | 10 | 10 | 10 | 45 | 44 | +1 | 30 | |
| 9 | (Georgian Soviet Socialist Republic) Dinamo Tbilisi | 30 | 8 | 14 | 8 | 29 | 34 | −5 | 30 | |
| 10 | (Ukrainian Soviet Socialist Republic) Dnipro Dnipropetrovsk | 30 | 9 | 11 | 10 | 31 | 39 | −8 | 29 | |
| 11 | (Ukrainian Soviet Socialist Republic) Karpaty Lviv | 30 | 8 | 12 | 10 | 33 | 33 | 0 | 28 | |
| 12 | (Ukrainian Soviet Socialist Republic) Shakhtar Donetsk | 30 | 8 | 12 | 10 | 31 | 35 | −4 | 28 | |
| 13 | (Russian Soviet Federative Socialist Republic) CSKA Moscow | 30 | 7 | 12 | 11 | 28 | 33 | −5 | 26 | |
| 14 | (Ukrainian Soviet Socialist Republic) Zarya Voroshilovgrad | 30 | 8 | 10 | 12 | 32 | 41 | −9 | 26 | |
| 15 | (Kazakh Soviet Socialist Republic) Kairat Alma-Ata (R) | 30 | 8 | 10 | 12 | 37 | 47 | −10 | 26 | Relegation to First League |
| 16 | (Moldavian Soviet Socialist Republic) Nistru Kishinev (R) | 30 | 4 | 8 | 18 | 32 | 59 | −27 | 16 | Relegation to First League |

(C) Champions; (R) Relegated

==== Results summary ====
| Overall | | | | | | | | Home | | | | | | Away | | | | | |
| Pld | W | D | L | GF | GA | GD | Pts | W | D | L | GF | GA | GD | W | D | L | GF | GA | GD |
|---|---|---|---|---|---|---|---|---|---|---|---|---|---|---|---|---|---|---|---|
| 30 | 14 | 12 | 4 | 49 | 14 | +35 | 54 | 13 | 2 | 0 | 35 | 5 | +30 | 1 | 10 | 4 | 14 | 9 | +5 |

==== Results by round ====
| Round | 1 | 2 | 3 | 4 | 5 | 6 | 7 | 8 | 9 | 10 | 11 | 12 | 13 | 14 | 15 | 16 | 17 | 18 | 19 | 20 | 21 | 22 | 23 | 24 | 25 | 26 | 27 | 28 | 29 | 30 |
|---|---|---|---|---|---|---|---|---|---|---|---|---|---|---|---|---|---|---|---|---|---|---|---|---|---|---|---|---|---|---|
| Ground | A | H | H | H | A | A | H | A | A | H | A | A | H | H | H | H | A | A | A | H | A | H | H | A | H | H | H | A | A | A |
| Result | D | W | W | W | L | D | W | W | D | W | D | D | W | D | W | W | D | D | L | W | D | W | D | D | W | W | W | D | L | L |
| Position | 5 | 3 | 2 | 2 | 3 | 2 | 1 | 1 | 1 | 1 | 1 | 1 | 1 | 1 | 1 | 1 | 1 | 1 | 1 | 1 | 1 | 1 | 1 | 1 | 1 | 1 | 1 | 1 | 1 | 1 |

A = Away; H = Home; W = Win; D = Draw; L = Loss

==== Matches ====
| 12 April 1974 1 | Zorya Voroshilovgrad | 1–1 | Dynamo Kyiv | Luhansk |
| MSK (UTC+3) | Pinchuk (yellow card) 43'; Belousov 83' | | Buryak 8'; Veremeyev (yellow card) 60' | Stadium: Avanhard Stadium; Attendance: 25,000; Referee: Valentin Lipatov |

| 21 April 1974 2 | Dynamo Kyiv | 1–0 | Shakhtar Donetsk | Kyiv |
| MSK (UTC+3) | Kolotov 74' (pen.) | | Zhukov (yellow card) | Stadium: Central Stadium; Attendance: 70,000; Referee: Tofiq Bahramov |

| 27 April 1974 3 | Dynamo Kyiv | 2–0 | Ararat Erewan | Kyiv |
| MSK (UTC+3) | Blokhin 33'; Onyshchenko 70' | | | Stadium: Central Stadium; Attendance: 50,000; Referee: Pavel Kazakov |

| 2 May 1974 4 | Dynamo Kyiv | 2–0 | Dinamo Tbilisi | Kyiv |
| MSK (UTC+3) | Kolotov 59', 78' | | | Stadium: Central Stadium; Attendance: 55,000; Referee: Miķelis Rubenis |

| 9 May 1974 5 | Nistru Kishinev | 1–0 | Dynamo Kyiv | Chișinău |
| MSK (UTC+3) | Atamalyan 70' | | Veremeyev (yellow card) | Stadium: Republican Stadium; Attendance: 25,000; Referee: Konstantin Smirnov |

| 14 May 1974 6 | Chornomorets Odesa | 3–3 | Dynamo Kyiv | Odesa |
| MSK (UTC+3) | Sapozhnikov 18'; Rodionov 33'; Dzyuba 61' | | Buryak 7', 45'; Blokhin 75' | Stadium: Chornomorets Stadium; Attendance: 50,000; Referee: Anatoliy Ivanov |

| 23 May 1974 7 | Dynamo Kyiv | 1–0 | Spartak Moscow | Kyiv |
| MSK (UTC+3) | Muntjan 62' | | | Stadium: Central Stadium; Attendance: 30,000; Referee: Nikolay Krylov |

| 31 May 1974 8 | Dynamo Moscow | 1–2 | Dynamo Kyiv | Moscow |
| MSK (UTC+3) | Yevryuzhikhin 51' (pen.) | | Blokhin 26'; Onyshchenko 31'; Matviyenko (yellow card) 70' | Stadium: Central Dynamo Stadium; Attendance: 38,000; Referee: Karlo Kruashvili |

| 10 June 1974 9 | Dnipro Dnipropetrovsk | 0–0 | Dynamo Kyiv | Dnipro |
| MSK (UTC+3) | | | | Stadium: Meteor Stadium; Attendance: 40,000; Referee: Vladimir Rudnev |

| 18 June 1974 10 | Dynamo Kyiv | 2–0 | Torpedo Moscow | Kyiv |
| MSK (UTC+3) | Onyshchenko 34', 44' | | | Stadium: Central Stadium; Attendance: 28,000; Referee: Gheorghi Bakanidze |

| 25 June 1974 11 | CSKA Moscow | 1–1 | Dynamo Kyiv | Moscow |
| MSK (UTC+3) | Smirnov 57' | | Kolotov 75' | Stadium: Luzhniki Stadium; Attendance: 25,000; Referee: Anatoliy Ivanov |

| 1 July 1974 12 | Karpaty Lviv | 0–0 | Dynamo Kyiv | Lviv |
| MSK (UTC+3) | | | | Stadium: Ukraina Stadium; Attendance: 40,000; Referee: Anatoliy Milchenko |

| 9 July 1974 13 | Dynamo Kyiv | 5–0 | Zenit Leningrad | Kyiv |
| MSK (UTC+3) | Troshkin 22'; Blokhin 23', 43', 48', 62' (pen.) (yellow card) 25' | | Trembach (yellow card) 74' | Stadium: Central Stadium; Attendance: 40,000; Referee: Vladimir Rudnev |

| 13 July 1974 14 | Dynamo Kyiv | 1–1 | Pakhtakor Tashkent | Kyiv |
| MSK (UTC+3) | Onyshchenko 32' | | Mogilnyi 75' | Stadium: Central Stadium; Attendance: 40,000; Referee: Vladimir Fardman |

| 26 July 1974 15 | Dynamo Kyiv | 2–0 | Kairat Alma-Ata | Kyiv |
| MSK (UTC+3) | Shepel 26'; Blokhin 54' | | | Stadium: Central Stadium; Attendance: 42,000; Referee: Hayk Karapetyan |

| 31 July 1974 16 | Dynamo Kyiv | 2–0 | Dynamo Moscow | Kyiv |
| MSK (UTC+3) | Troshkin 8'; Blokhin 25' | | | Stadium: Central Stadium; Attendance: 60,000; Referee: Karlo Kruashvili |

| 6 August 1974 17 | Shakhtar Donetsk | 2–2 | Dynamo Kyiv | Donetsk |
| MSK (UTC+3) | Gubich 26'; Starukhin 83' | | Blokhin 25' (pen.); Onyshchenko 60' | Stadium: Central Stadium (Donetsk); Attendance: 40,000; Referee: Miķelis Rubenis |

| 14 August 1974 18 | Dinamo Tbilisi | 0–0 | Dynamo Kyiv | Tbilisi |
| MSK (UTC+3) | | | | Stadium: Lokomotivi Stadium; Attendance: 30,000; Referee: Pavel Kazakov |

| 20 August 1974 19 | Spartak Moscow | 2–0 | Dynamo Kyiv | Moscow |
| MSK (UTC+3) | Bulgakov 24'; Piskarev 52' | | Veremeyev (yellow card) 80' | Stadium: Luzhniki Stadium; Attendance: 50,000; Referee: Vladimir Alov |

| 3 September 1974 20 | Dynamo Kyiv | 5–0 | Zorya Voroshilovgrad | Kyiv |
| MSK (UTC+3) | Buryak 35'; Blokhin 47', 84', 90'; Onyshchenko 77' | | | Stadium: Central Stadium; Attendance: 34,000; Referee: Eldar Azimzade |

| 9 September 1974 21 | Ararat Erewan | 0–0 | Dynamo Kyiv | Yerevan |
| MSK (UTC+3) | | | | Stadium: Hrazdan Stadium; Attendance: 49,700; Referee: Vladimir Rudnev |

| 14 September 1974 22 | Dynamo Kyiv | 2–0 | Chornomorets Odesa | Kyiv |
| MSK (UTC+3) | Blokhin 32'; Onyshchenko 56' | | | Stadium: Central Stadium; Attendance: 70,000; Referee: German Glukhovskoy |

| 22 September 1974 23 | Dynamo Kyiv | 1–1 | Karpaty Lviv | Kyiv |
| MSK (UTC+3) | Kolotov 43' (pen.); Reshko (yellow card) 65'; Onyshchenko (yellow card) 70' | | Savka 6'; Fursov (yellow card) 45'; Krupej (yellow card) 50'; Gereg (yellow card) 53' | Stadium: Central Stadium; Attendance: 45,000; Referee: Aleksandr Tabakov |

| 6 October 1974 24 | Torpedo Moscow | 1–1 | Dynamo Kyiv | Moscow |
| MSK (UTC+3) | Yurin 26' | | Blokhin 76' | Stadium: Luzhniki Stadium; Attendance: 30,000; Referee: Kęstutis Andziulis |

| 13 October 1974 25 | Dynamo Kyiv | 3–1 | Dnipro Dnipropetrovsk | Kyiv |
| MSK (UTC+3) | Onyshchenko 6'; Blokhin 83', 84' | | Khristyan 47'; Nayda (yellow card) 75' | Stadium: Central Stadium; Attendance: 25,000; Referee: Matevos Mkrtchyan |

| 19 October 1974 26 | Dynamo Kyiv | 2–0 | CSKA Moscow | Kyiv |
| MSK (UTC+3) | Veremeyev 26'; Onyshchenko 42'; Zuev (yellow card) 71' | | | Stadium: Central Stadium; Attendance: 30,000; Referee: Anatoliy Ivanov |

| 2 November 1974 27 | Dynamo Kyiv | 4–2 | Nistru Kishinev | Kyiv |
| MSK (UTC+3) | Buryak 2'; Kolotov 35', 42'; Blokhin 89' | | Zhuravlev 7'; Nadein (yellow card) 40'; Filimonov 84' | Stadium: Central Stadium; Attendance: 25,000; Referee: Nikolay Zhikharev |

| 10 November 1974 28 | Pakhtakor Tashkent | 3–3 | Dynamo Kyiv | Tashkent |
| MSK (UTC+3) | Hatzipanagis 5'; Isokov 72'; Varyukhin 89' | | Muntjan 31'; Blokhin 32'; Onyshchenko 71' | Stadium: Pakhtakor Central Stadium; Attendance: 40,000; Referee: Aleksandr Tabakov |

| 17 November 1974 29 | Kairat Alma-Ata | 2–1 | Dynamo Kyiv | Almaty |
| MSK (UTC+3) | Mertian 4'; Ionkin 84' (pen.) | | Blokhin 19' | Stadium: Almaty Central Stadium; Attendance: 25,000; Referee: Valentin Lipatov |

| 21 November 1974 30 | Zenit Leningrad | 2–0 | Dynamo Kyiv | Leningrad |
| MSK (UTC+3) | Nikolaev 38'; Zinchenko 76' | | | Stadium: Kirov Stadium; Attendance: 10,000; Referee: Boris Belozerov |

=== Soviet Cup ===
==== Quarter-finals ====
| 15 June 1974 First leg | Dnipro Dnipropetrovsk | 2–3 | Dynamo Kyiv | Dnipro |
| MSK (UTC+3) | Evseenko 21'; Nayda 89' (pen.) | | Kovalyov 34'; Blokhin 48'; Muntjan 54' | Stadium: Meteor Stadium; Attendance: 20,000; Referee: Hayk Karapetyan |

| 21 June 1974 Second leg | Dynamo Kyiv | 2–1 (5–3 agg.) | Dnipro Dnipropetrovsk | Kyiv |
| MSK (UTC+3) | Shevchenko 59'; Buryak 64' | | Solovyov 12' | Stadium: Central Stadium; Attendance: 30,000; Referee: Valentin Lipatov |

==== Semi-finals ====
| 28 June 1974 First leg | Dynamo Kyiv | 1–0 | Dinamo Tbilisi | Kyiv |
| MSK (UTC+3) | Blokhin 56' | | Chelidze (yellow card) 65'; Asatiani (yellow card) 75' | Stadium: Central Stadium; Attendance: 20,000; Referee: Aleksandr Tabakov |

| 5 July 1974 Second leg | Dinamo Tbilisi | 0–0 (0–1 agg.) | Dynamo Kyiv | Tbilisi |
| MSK (UTC+3) | Kanteladze (yellow card) 80' | | Onyshchenko (yellow card) 75' | Stadium: Lokomotivi Stadium; Attendance: 35,000; Referee: Tofiq Bahramov |

==== Final ====
| 10 August 1974 Final | Dynamo Kyiv | 3–0 (a.e.t.) | Zorya Voroshilovgrad | Moscow |
| MSK (UTC+3) | Muntjan 92'; Blokhin 102'; Onyshchenko 118' | | Kuznetsov (yellow card) 49'; Malyhin (yellow card) 118' | Stadium: Luzhniki Stadium; Attendance: 55,000; Referee: Valentin Lipatov |

=== European Cup Winners' Cup ===
==== First round ====
| 18 September 1974 First leg | Dynamo Kyiv (Soviet Union) | 1–0 | (Bulgaria) CSKA Sofia | Central Stadium, Kiev |
| MSK (UTC+3) | Blokhin 57' | | Zhekov (yellow card) 61' | Attendance: 75,000; Referee: Orhan Cebe (Turkey) |

| 2 October 1974 Second leg | CSKA Sofia (Bulgaria) | 0–1 (0–2 agg.) | (Soviet Union) Dynamo Kyiv | Vasil Levski National Stadium, Sofia |
| MSK (UTC+3) | Denev (yellow card) 74' | | Buryak (yellow card) 32'; Blokhin 81' | Attendance: 35,000; Referee: Günter Männig (East Germany) |

==== Second round ====
| 23 October 1974 First leg | Eintracht Frankfurt (West Germany) | 2–3 | (Soviet Union) Dynamo Kyiv | Waldstadion, Frankfurt |
| MSK (UTC+3) | Nickel 2'; Körbel 64' (pen.) | | Onyshchenko 32'; Blokhin 83'; Muntjan 87'; Fomenko (yellow card); Matviyenko (yellow card); Zuev (yellow card); Veremeyev (yellow card) | Attendance: 25,000; Referee: Cesar Correia (Portugal) |

| 6 November 1974 Second leg | Dynamo Kyiv (Soviet Union) | 2–1 (5–3 agg.) | (West Germany) Eintracht Frankfurt | Central Stadium, Kiev |
| MSK (UTC+3) | Onyshchenko 1', 39' | | Rohrbach 47' | Attendance: 60,000; Referee: Martti Hirviniemi (Finland) |

==== Quarter-finals ====
| 5 March 1975 First leg | Bursaspor (Turkey) | 0–1 | (Soviet Union) Dynamo Kyiv | Bursa Atatürk Stadium, Bursa |
| MSK (UTC+3) | | | Onyshchenko 21' | Attendance: 30,000; Referee: Tsvetan Stanev (Bulgaria) |

| 19 March 1975 Second leg | Dynamo Kyiv (Soviet Union) | 2–0 (3–0 agg.) | (Turkey) Bursaspor | Central Stadium, Kiev |
| MSK (UTC+3) | Kolotov 72' (pen.); Muntyan 87'; Blokhin (yellow card); Veremeyev (yellow card) | | Batmaz (yellow card); Kavak (yellow card) | Attendance: 95,000; Referee: Kurt Tschenscher (West Germany) |

==== Semi-finals ====
| 9 April 1975 First leg | Dynamo Kyiv (Soviet Union) | 3–0 | (Netherlands) PSV Eindhoven | Central Stadium, Kiev |
| MSK (UTC+3) | Kolotov 17'; Onyshchenko 31'; Blokhin 56' | | Quaars (yellow card) 48' | Attendance: 100,000; Referee: Pat Partridge (England) |

| 23 April 1975 Second leg | PSV Eindhoven (Netherlands) | 2–1 (2–4 agg.) | (Soviet Union) Dynamo Kyiv | Philips Stadion, Eindhoven |
| MSK (UTC+3) | Edström 22', 85' van Kraay (yellow card) 89' | | Konkov (yellow card) 17'; Veremeyev (yellow card) 19' (yellow-red card) 83'; Buryak 77' | Attendance: 24,000; Referee: Pablo Sánchez Ibáñez (Spain) |

==== Final ====
| 14 May 1975 Final | Dynamo Kyiv (Soviet Union) | 3–0 | (Hungary) Ferencváros | St. Jakob Stadium, Basel |
| MSK (UTC+3) | Onyshchenko 18', 39'; Blokhin 67' | | | Attendance: 13,000; Referee: Robert Davidson (Scotland) |
