= Soviet Union national football team results (1970–1992) =

The following is a list of the Soviet Union national football team results from 1973 to 1992.

== Results ==
Key
Win
Draw
Defeat

== Matches ==
=== 1970 ===
14 February Friendly	Peru	0–0	Soviet Union	Lima, Peru
		Report		Stadium: Estadio Nacional; Attendance: 41,535; Referee: Alberto Tejada (Peru)

20 February Friendly	Peru	0–2	Soviet Union	Lima, Peru
		Report	Byshovets 75', 79'	Stadium: Estadio Nacional; Attendance: 27,011; Referee: César Orozco (Peru)

22 February Friendly	El Salvador	0–2	Soviet Union	San Salvador, El Salvador
		Report	Puzach 32'; Serebryanikov 46'	Stadium: Estadio Nacional Flor Blanca; Attendance: 31,283; Referee: Diego de Leo (Mexico)

26 February Friendly	Mexico	0–0	Soviet Union	Mexico City, Mexico
		Report		Stadium: Estadio Azteca; Attendance: 51,893; Referee: Mario Canessa (Chile)

5 May Friendly	Bulgaria	3–3	Soviet Union	Sofia, Bulgaria
	Zhekov 3', 64'; Bonev 70'	Report	Yevryuzhikhin 20'; Byshovets 44'; Nodia 75'	Stadium: Vasil Levski Stadium; Attendance: 11,169; Referee: Andrei Rădulescu (Romania)

6 May Friendly	Bulgaria	0–0	Soviet Union	Sofia, Bulgaria
		Report		Stadium: Vasil Levski Stadium; Attendance: 31,174; Referee: Aurel Bentu (Romania)

31 May 1970 World Cup GS	Mexico	0–0	Soviet Union	Mexico City, Mexico
12:00		Report		Stadium: Estadio Azteca; Attendance: 107,160; Referee: Kurt Tschenscher (West Germany)

6 June 1970 World Cup GS	Soviet Union	4–1	Belgium	Mexico City, Mexico
16:00	Byshovets 14', 63'; Asatiani 57'; Khmelnytskyi 76'	Report	Lambert 86'	Stadium: Estadio Azteca; Attendance: 95,261; Referee: Rudolf Scheurer (Switzerland)

10 June 1970 World Cup GS	Soviet Union	2–0	El Salvador	Mexico City, Mexico
16:00	Byshovets 51', 74'	Report		Stadium: Estadio Azteca; Attendance: 89,979; Referee: Rafael Hormazábal Díaz (Chile)

14 June 1970 World Cup QF	Soviet Union	0–1 (a.e.t.)	Uruguay	Mexico City, Mexico
12:00		Report	Espárrago 117'	Stadium: Estadio Azteca; Attendance: 26,085; Referee: Laurens van Ravens (Netherlands)

28 October Friendly	Soviet Union	4–0	Yugoslavia	Moscow, Soviet Union
	Shevchenko 20'; Fedotov 34'; Kolotov 55'; Nodiya 74'	Report		Stadium: Central Lenin Stadium; Attendance: 25,000; Referee: Marian Środecki (Poland)

15 November 1972 UEFA Euro qualification	Cyprus	1–3	Soviet Union	Nicosia, Cyprus
15:00	Charalambous 42'	Report	Kolotov 10'; Yevryuzhikhin 16'; Shevchenko 50'	Stadium: GSP Stadium; Attendance: 8,980; Referee: Petar Kostovski (Yugoslavia)

=== 1971 ===
17 February Friendly	Mexico	0–0	Soviet Union	Guadalajara, Mexico
		Report		Stadium: Estadio Jalisco; Attendance: 50,000; Referee: Javier Galindo (Mexico)

20 February Friendly	Mexico	0–0	Soviet Union	Mexico City, Mexico
		Report		Stadium: Estadio Azteca; Attendance: 31,000; Referee: Diego de Leo (Mexico)

28 February Friendly	El Salvador	0–1	Soviet Union	San Salvador. El Salvador
		Report	Osorio 30' (o.g.)	Stadium: Estadio Nacional Flor Blanca; Attendance: 32,000; Referee: Mario Martínez Cea (El Salvador)

28 April Friendly	Bulgaria	1–1	Soviet Union	Sofia, Bulgaria
	Mitkov 36' (pen.)	Report	Shevchenko 44'	Stadium: Vasil Levski Stadium; Attendance: 15,000; Referee: Constantin Bărbulescu (Romania)

30 May 1972 UEFA Euro qualification	Soviet Union	2–1	Spain	Moscow, Soviet Union
18:30	Kolotov 79'; Shevchenko 83'	Report	Rexach 88'	Stadium: Central Lenin Stadium; Attendance: 81,700; Referee: Ferdinand Biwersi (West Germany)

7 June 1972 UEFA Euro qualification	Soviet Union	6–1	Cyprus	Moscow, Soviet Union
19:30	Fedotov 4', 86'; Yevryuzhikhin 23', 38'; Kolotov 59'; Banishevski 85'	Report	S. Michael 75'	Stadium: Central Lenin Stadium; Attendance: 21,159; Referee: Erik Beijar (Finland)

14 June Friendly	Soviet Union	1–0	Scotland	Moscow, Soviet Union
	Yevryuzhikhin 25'	Report		Stadium: Lenin Stadium; Attendance: 30,000; Referee: Ferdinand Marschall (Austria)

18 September Friendly	Soviet Union	5–0	India	Moscow, Soviet Union
	Kolotov 6', 35', 39'; Khmelnytskyi 49', 71'	Report		Stadium: Dynamo Stadium; Attendance: 12,000; Referee: Pavel Kazakov (Soviet Union)

22 September 1972 UEFA Euro qualification	Soviet Union	1–0	Northern Ireland	Moscow, Soviet Union
19:30	Muntyan 43'	Report		Stadium: Central Lenin Stadium; Attendance: 51,186; Referee: Ove Dahlberg (Sweden)

13 October 1972 UEFA Euro qualification	Northern Ireland	1–1	Soviet Union	Belfast, Northern Ireland
16:00	Nicholson 13'	Report	Byshovets 32'	Stadium: Windsor Park; Attendance: 16,573; Referee: Rolf Nyhus (Norway)

27 October 1972 UEFA Euro qualification	Spain	0–0	Soviet Union	Seville, Spain
20:30		Report		Stadium: Estadio Ramón Sánchez Pizjuán; Attendance: 40,169; Referee: Norman Burtenshaw (England)

=== 1972 ===
29 March Friendly	Bulgaria	1–1	Soviet Union	Sofia, Bulgaria
	Bonev 78'	Report	Kolotov 80'	Stadium: Vasil Levski Stadium; Attendance: 30,000; Referee: Bohumil Smejkal (Czechoslovakia)

19 April Friendly	Soviet Union	2–0	Peru	Kiev, Soviet Union
	Banishevskiy 14'; Konkov 18'	Report		Stadium: Central Stadium; Attendance: 48,000; Referee: Wolfgang Riedel (East Germany)

30 April 1972 UEFA Euro QF	Yugoslavia	0–0	Soviet Union	Belgrade, Yugoslavia
16:00		Report		Stadium: Stadion Crvena zvezda Attendance: 58,312; Referee: Rudolf Scheurer (Switzerland)

13 May 1972 UEFA Euro QF	Soviet Union	3–0	Yugoslavia	Moscow, Soviet Union
15:00	Kolotov 53'; Banishevskiy 74'; Kozynkevych 90'	Report		Stadium: Central Lenin Stadium; Attendance: 90,263; Referee: Aurelio Angonese (Italy)

26 May Friendly	West Germany	4–1	Soviet Union	Munich, West Germany
	Müller 49', 52', 62', 65'	Report	Kolotov 73'	Stadium: Olympiastadion; Attendance: 77,000; Referee: Armando Marques (Brazil)

7 June Friendly	Soviet Union	1–0	Bulgaria	Moscow, Soviet Union
	Muntyan 65' (pen.)	Report		Stadium: Lenin Stadium; Attendance: 40,000; Referee: Karl Göppel (Switzerland)

14 June 1972 UEFA Euro SF	Hungary	0–1	Soviet Union	Brussels, Belgium
20:00		Report	Konkov 53'	Stadium: Stade Émile Versé; Attendance: 1,659; Referee: Rudi Glöckner (East Germany)

18 June 1972 UEFA Euro Final	West Germany	3–0	Soviet Union	Brussels, Belgium
16:00	Müller 27', 58'; Wimmer 52'	Report		Stadium: Heysel Stadium; Attendance: 43,437; Referee: Ferdinand Marschall (Austria)

29 June Brazil Independence Cup	Soviet Union	1–0	Uruguay	São Paulo, Brazil
	Onishchenko 59'	Report		Stadium: Estádio do Morumbi; Attendance: 10,000; Referee: Abraham Klein (Israel)

2 July Brazil Independence Cup	Argentina	1–0	Soviet Union	Belo Horizonte, Brazil
	Pastoriza 75'	Report		Stadium: Mineirão; Attendance: 8,000; Referee: Alfonso González Archundía (Mexico)

6 July Brazil Independence Cup	Portugal	1–0	Soviet Union	Belo Horizonte, Brazil
	Jordão 46'	Report		Stadium: Mineirão; Attendance: 12,000; Referee: Kurt Tschenscher (West Germany)

16 July Friendly	Finland	1–1	Soviet Union	Vaasa, Finland
	Rissanen 76'	Report	Blokhin 16'	Stadium: Hietalahti Stadium; Attendance: 6,100; Referee: Rolf Nyhus (Norway)

6 August Friendly	Sweden	4–4	Soviet Union	Solna, Sweden
	Edström 17', 49', 79'; Pålsson 72'	Report	Yeliseyev 32'; Andreasyan 42'; Semyonov 44'; Blokhin 77'	Stadium: Råsunda; Attendance: 14,327; Referee: Svein Thime (Norway)

13 October 1974 World Cup qualification	France	1–0	Soviet Union	Paris, France
	Bereta 61'	Report		Stadium: Parc des Princes; Attendance: 29,746; Referee: Scheurer (Switzerland)

18 October 1974 World Cup qualification	Republic of Ireland	1–2	Soviet Union	Dublin, Republic of Ireland
	Conroy 83'	Report	Fedotov 55'; Kolotov 65'	Stadium: Lansdowne Road; Attendance: 27,656; Referee: Øberg (Norway)

=== 1990 ===
20 February 1990 Marlboro Cup	Colombia	0–0 (a.e.t.) (4–2 p)	Soviet Union	Los Angeles, United States
				Stadium: Memorial Coliseum; Attendance: 18,132; Referee: Angelo Bratsis (United States)

22 February 1990 Marlboro Cup	Costa Rica	1–2	Soviet Union	Los Angeles, United States
	Cayasso 35'		Litovchenko 68'; Cherenkov 77'	Stadium: Memorial Coliseum; Attendance: 29,323; Referee: Angelo Bratsis (United States)

24 February Friendly	United States	1–3	Soviet Union	Palo Alto, United States
	Harkes 41' (pen.)	Report	Bessonov 29'; Cherenkov 45'; Protasov 68'	Stadium: Stanford Stadium; Attendance: 61,000; Referee: Vincent Mauro (United States)

28 March Friendly	Soviet Union	2–1	Netherlands	Kiev, Soviet Union
	Protasov 10' (pen.); Lyuty 80'		Koeman 69' (pen.)	Stadium: Republican Stadium; Attendance: 85,000; Referee: Sándor Puhl (Hungary)

25 April Friendly	Republic of Ireland	1–0	Soviet Union	Dublin, Ireland
	Staunton 59'			Stadium: Lansdowne Road; Attendance: 43,900; Referee: Alfred Kleinaitis (USA)

16 May Friendly	Israel	3–2	Soviet Union	Ramat Gan, Israel
	Malmilian 18'; Levin 31'; Banin 69'		Litovchenko 27'; Mikhailichenko 42'	Stadium: Ramat Gan Stadium; Attendance: 50,000; Referee: Frans Van Den Wijngaert (Belgium)

9 June 1990 FIFA World Cup GS	Soviet Union	0–2	Romania	Bari, Italy
17:00		Report	Lăcătuş 42', 57' (pen.)	Stadium: Stadio San Nicola; Attendance: 42,907; Referee: Juan Daniel Cardellino (Uruguay)

13 June 1990 FIFA World Cup GS	Argentina	2–0	Soviet Union	Naples, Italy
21:00	Troglio 27'; Burruchaga 79'	Report		Stadium: Stadio San Paolo; Attendance: 55,759; Referee: Erik Fredriksson (Sweden)

18 June 1990 FIFA World Cup GS	Cameroon	0–4	Soviet Union	Bari, Italy
21:00		Report	Protasov 20'; Zygmantovich 29'; Zavarov 52'; Dobrovolski 63'	Stadium: Stadio San Nicola; Attendance: 37,307; Referee: José Roberto Wright (Brazil)

29 August Friendly	Soviet Union	1–2	Romania	Moscow, Soviet Union
	Mykhaylychenko 71'	Report	Lăcătuş 14' (pen.); Lupescu 64'	Stadium: Central Lenin Stadium; Attendance: 15,000; Referee: Michał Listkiewicz (Poland)

12 September UEFA Euro 1992 qualifying	Soviet Union	2–0	Norway	Moscow, Soviet Union
19:00	Kanchelskis 22'; Kuznetsov 60'	Report		Stadium: Central Lenin Stadium; Attendance: 23,000; Referee: Hubert Forstinger (Austria)

3 November UEFA Euro 1992 qualifying	Italy	0–0	Soviet Union	Rome, Italy
14:30		Report		Stadium: Stadio Olimpico; Attendance: 52,208; Referee: Marcel Van Langenhove (Belgium)

21 November Carib-BWIA Triangular Soccer Series	United States	0–0	Soviet Union	Port of Spain, Trinidad and Tobago
		Report		Stadium: Queen's Park Oval; Attendance: 5,000; Referee: Willie Stewart (Trinidad & Tobago)

23 November Carib-BWIA Triangular Soccer Series	Trinidad and Tobago	0–2	Soviet Union	Port of Spain, Trinidad and Tobago
			Shalimov 29'; Tsveiba 51'	Stadium: Queen's Park Oval; Attendance: 7,000; Referee: Lennox Sirjuesingh (Trinidad & Tobago)

30 November Friendly	Guatemala	0–3	Soviet Union	Guatemala City, Guatemala
			Mostovoi 17'; Dobrovolskiy 20'; Kolyvanov 45'	Stadium: Doroteo Guamuch Flores Stadium; Attendance: 20,000; Referee: José Chinchilla González (Guatemala)

=== 1991 ===
6 February Friendly	Scotland	0–1	Soviet Union	Glasgow, Scotland
			Kuznetsov 80'	Stadium: Ibrox Park; Attendance: 20,763; Referee: Peter Mikkelsen (Denmark)

27 March Friendly	Germany	2–1	Soviet Union	Frankfurt am Main, Germany
	Reuter 65'; Matthäus 81'		Dobrovolski 83' (pen.)	Stadium: Waldstadion; Attendance: 24,000; Referee: Michał Listkiewicz (Poland)

17 April UEFA Euro 1992 qualifying	Hungary	0–1	Soviet Union	Budapest, Hungary
19:00			Mikhailichenko 30'	Stadium: Népstadion; Attendance: 43,221; Referee: Aron Schmidhuber (Germany)

21 May 1991 England Challenge Cup	England	3–1	Soviet Union	London, England
20:00	Smith 16'; Platt 43' (pen.), 89'	Report	Tatarchuk 9'	Stadium: Wembley Stadium; Attendance: 23,789; Referee: Emilio Soriano Aladrén (Spain)

23 May 1991 England Challenge Cup	Argentina	1–1	Soviet Union	Manchester, England
20:00	Ruggeri 44'		Kolyvanov 49'	Stadium: Old Trafford; Attendance: 23,743; Referee: Peter Mikkelsen (Denmark)

29 May UEFA Euro 1992 qualifying	Soviet Union	4–0	Cyprus	Moscow, Soviet Union
19:00	Mostovoi 10'; Mikhailichenko 51'; Korneev 87'; Aleinikov 89'	Report		Stadium: Central Lenin Stadium; Attendance: 14,200; Referee: Ștefan Dan Petrescu (Romania)

13 June Scania 100 Tournament	Sweden	2–3 (a.e.t.)	Soviet Union	Gothenburg, Sweden
	Brolin 4', 114'		Yuran 69'; Kuznetsov 94'; Korneev 117'	Stadium: Ullevi; Attendance: 14,225; Referee: Peter Mikkelsen (Denmark)

16 June Scania 100 Tournament	Italy	1–1 (a.e.t.) (3–2 p)	Soviet Union	Solna, Sweden
	Giannini 43'		Korneev 2'	Stadium: Råsunda Stadium; Attendance: 8,062; Referee: George Courtney (England)
	Penalties
	Berti (penalty missed); Baresi (penalty scored); De Agostini (penalty scored); Vierchowod (penalty scored)		(penalty missed) Shalimov; (penalty scored) Kuznetsov; (penalty missed) Kulkov; (penalty scored) Kanchelskis; (penalty missed) Mostovoi

28 August UEFA Euro 1992 qualifying	Norway	0–1	Soviet Union	Oslo, Norway
19:00		Report	Mostovoi 74'	Stadium: Ullevaal Stadion; Attendance: 24,383; Referee: Howard King (Wales)

25 September UEFA Euro 1992 qualifying	Soviet Union	2–2	Hungary	Moscow, Soviet Union
19:00	Shalimov 37' (pen.); Kanchelskis 50'	Report	Kiprich 16', 84'	Stadium: Central Lenin Stadium; Attendance: 34,973; Referee: Zoran Petrović (Yugoslavia)

12 October UEFA Euro 1992 qualifying	Soviet Union	0–0	Italy	Moscow, Soviet Union
19:00		Report		Stadium: Central Lenin Stadium; Attendance: 86,486; Referee: Bruno Galler (Switzerland)

13 November UEFA Euro 1992 qualifying	Cyprus	0–3	Soviet Union	Larnaca, Cyprus
20:15		Report	Protasov 26'; Yuran 78'; Kanchelskis 81'	Stadium: GSZ Stadium; Attendance: 3,379; Referee: Andrew Waddell (Scotland)

=== 1992 ===
25 January Friendly	United States	0–1	CIS	Miami, United States
		Report	Tsveiba 67'	Stadium: Joe Robbie Stadium; Attendance: 30,866; Referee: Raúl Domínguez (United States)

29 January Friendly	El Salvador	0–3	CIS	San Salvador, El Salvador
			Pyatnitsky 8'; Ledyakhov 22'; Kiryakov 63'	Stadium: Estadio Cuscatlán; Attendance: 10,000

2 February Friendly	United States	2–1	CIS	Pontiac, United States
	Wynalda 4'; Balboa 75' (pen.)	Report	Sergeyev 27'	Stadium: Pontiac Silverdome; Attendance: 35,248; Referee: Jack D'Aquila (United States)

12 February Friendly	Israel	1–2	CIS	Jerusalem, Israel
	Driks 36'	Report	Pyatnitskiy 16'; Kiryakov 50'	Stadium: Itztadion Teddy; Attendance: 2,000; Referee: Fritz Kaupe (Austria)

19 February Friendly	Spain	1–1	CIS	Valencia, Spain
	Hierro 86'	Report	Kiryakov 73'	Stadium: Estadio Luis Casanova; Attendance: 10,000; Referee: Philippe Leduc (France)

29 April Friendly	CIS	2–2	England	Moscow, Russia
	Tskhadadze 44'; Kiryakov 54'	Report	Lineker 16'; Steven 73'	Stadium: Lenin Central Stadium; Attendance: 28,000; Referee: Piotr Werner (Poland)

3 June Friendly	Denmark	1–1	CIS	Brøndbyvester, Denmark
	Christensen 34'	Report	Kolyvanov 52'	Stadium: Brøndby Stadium; Attendance: 5,339; Referee: Andrew Waddell (Scotland)

12 June UEFA Euro 1992 GS	CIS	1–1	Germany	Norrköping, Sweden
20:15	Dobrovolski 64'	Report	Häßler 90'	Stadium: Nya Parken; Attendance: 17,410; Referee: Gérard Biguet (France)

15 June UEFA Euro 1992 GS	Netherlands	0–0	CIS	Gothenburg, Sweden
20:15		Report		Stadium: Ullevi; Attendance: 34,440; Referee: Peter Mikkelsen (Denmark)

18 June UEFA Euro 1992 GS	Scotland	3–0	CIS	Norrköping, Sweden
20:15	McStay 4'; McClair 16'; McAllister 84'	Report		Stadium: Nya Parken; Attendance: 14,660; Referee: Kurt Röthlisberger (Switzerland)
