= UEFA Euro 1972 qualifying Group 4 =

Football tournament qualification stage

Group 4 of the UEFA Euro 1972 qualifying tournament was one of the eight groups to decide which teams would qualify for the UEFA Euro 1972 finals tournament. Group 4 consisted of four teams: Soviet Union, Spain, Northern Ireland, and Cyprus, where they played against each other home-and-away in a round-robin format. The group winners were the Soviet Union, who finished two points above Spain.

== Final table ==
Pos	Team	Pld	W	D	L	GF	GA	GD	Pts	Qualification	(Soviet Union)	(Spain)	(Northern Ireland)	(Cyprus)
1	Soviet Union	6	4	2	0	13	4	+9	10	Advance to quarter-finals	—	2–1	1–0	6–1
2	Spain	6	3	2	1	14	3	+11	8		0–0	—	3–0	7–0
3	Northern Ireland	6	2	2	2	10	6	+4	6		1–1	1–1	—	5–0
4	Cyprus	6	0	0	6	2	26	−24	0		1–3	0–2	0–3	—

Source: UEFA
Rules for classification: Qualification tiebreakers

== Matches ==
11 November 1970
20:30

Spain	3–0	Northern Ireland
Rexach 39'; Pirri 60'; Aragonés 75'	Report

Estadio Ramón Sánchez Pizjuán, Seville
Attendance: 26,215
Referee: Gyula Emsberger (Hungary)

15 November 1970
15:00

Cyprus	1–3	Soviet Union
Charalambous 42'	Report	Kolotov 10'; Yevryuzhikhin 16'; Shevchenko 50'

GSP Stadium, Nicosia
Attendance: 8,980
Referee: Petar Kostovski (Yugoslavia)

3 February 1971
15:00

Cyprus	0–3	Northern Ireland
	Report	Nicholson 53'; Dougan 55'; Best 86' (pen.)

GSP Stadium, Nicosia
Attendance: 9,119
Referee: Francesco Francescon (Italy)

21 April 1971
19:45

Northern Ireland	5–0	Cyprus
Dougan 2'; Best 44', 47', 56'; Nicholson 85'	Report

Windsor Park, Belfast
Attendance: 19,153
Referee: Jacques Colling (Luxembourg)

9 May 1971
16:30

Cyprus	0–2	Spain
	Report	Pirri 3'; Violeta 86'

GSP Stadium, Nicosia
Attendance: 5,818
Referee: Constantin Bărbulescu (Romania)

30 May 1971
18:30

Soviet Union	2–1	Spain
Kolotov 79'; Shevchenko 83'	Report	Rexach 88'

Central Lenin Stadium, Moscow
Attendance: 81,700
Referee: Ferdinand Biwersi (West Germany)

7 June 1971
19:30

Soviet Union	6–1	Cyprus
Fedotov 4', 86'; Yevryuzhikhin 23', 38'; Kolotov 59'; Banishevski 85'	Report	S. Michael 75'

Central Lenin Stadium, Moscow
Attendance: 21,159
Referee: Erik Beijar (Finland)

22 September 1971
19:30

Soviet Union	1–0	Northern Ireland
Muntyan 43'	Report

Central Lenin Stadium, Moscow
Attendance: 51,186
Referee: Ove Dahlberg (Sweden)

13 October 1971
16:00

Northern Ireland	1–1	Soviet Union
Nicholson 13'	Report	Byshovets 32'

Windsor Park, Belfast
Attendance: 16,573
Referee: Rolf Nyhus (Norway)

27 October 1971
20:30

Spain	0–0	Soviet Union
	Report

Estadio Ramón Sánchez Pizjuán, Seville
Attendance: 40,169
Referee: Norman Burtenshaw (England)

24 November 1971
20:00

Spain	7–0	Cyprus
Pirri 9', 47' (pen.); Quino 13', 22'; Aguilar 63'; Lora 66'; Rojo 75'	Report

Estadio Los Cármenes, Granada
Attendance: 19,176
Referee: Joseph Cassar Naudi (Malta)

16 February 1972
15:00

Northern Ireland	1–1	Spain
Morgan 71'	Report	Rojo 41'

Boothferry Park, Kingston upon Hull
Attendance: 19,925
Referee: Jack Taylor (England)

== Goalscorers ==
There were 39 goals scored in 12 matches, for an average of 3.25 goals per match.

4 goals

- (Northern Ireland) George Best
- (Spain) Pirri

3 goals

- (Northern Ireland) Jimmy Nicholson
- (Soviet Union) Viktor Kolotov
- (Soviet Union) Gennady Yevryuzhikhin

2 goals

- (Northern Ireland) Derek Dougan
- (Soviet Union) Vladimir Fedotov
- (Soviet Union) Vitaly Shevchenko
- (Spain) Quino
- (Spain) Carles Rexach
- (Spain) José Francisco Rojo

1 goal

- (Cyprus) Nikos Charalambous
- (Cyprus) Stefanis Michael
- (Northern Ireland) [[Sammy Morgan (footballer)|]]
- (Soviet Union) Anatoliy Banishevskiy
- (Soviet Union) Anatoliy Byshovets
- (Soviet Union) Vladimir Muntyan
- (Spain) Francisco Aguilar
- (Spain) Luis Aragonés
- (Spain) Enrique Lora
- (Spain) José Luis Violeta
