= 1974 in Soviet football =

Football in the Soviet Union
- Season: 1974

Men's football
- Top League: Dinamo Kiev
- First League: Lokomotiv Moscow
- Second League: Alga Frunze
- USSR Cup: Dinamo Kiev
- Amateur Cup: Metalurgi Rustavi

Soviet Amateur Cup

The 1974 Soviet football championship was the 42nd seasons of competitive football in the Soviet Union and the 36th among teams of sports societies and factories. Dinamo Kiev won the championship becoming the Soviet domestic champions for the sixth time.

== Honours ==
Competition	Winner	Runner-up
Top League	Dinamo Kiev (6)	Spartak Moscow
First League	Lokomotiv Moscow (3)	SKA Rostov-na-Donu
Second League	Alga Frunze	Rubin Kazan
Soviet Cup	Dinamo Kiev (4)	Zaria Voroshilovgrad

Notes = Number in parentheses is the times that club has won that honour. * indicates new record for competition

== Soviet Union football championship ==
=== Top League ===
Pos	Team	Pld	W	D	L	GF	GA	GD	Pts	Qualification or relegation
1	(Ukrainian Soviet Socialist Republic) Dynamo Kyiv (C)	30	14	12	4	49	24	+25	40	Qualification for European Cup first round
2	(Russian Soviet Federative Socialist Republic) Spartak Moscow	30	15	9	6	41	23	+18	39	Qualification for UEFA Cup first round
3	(Ukrainian Soviet Socialist Republic) Chornomorets Odessa	30	12	11	7	35	31	+4	35	Qualification for UEFA Cup first round
4	(Russian Soviet Federative Socialist Republic) Torpedo Moscow	30	13	7	10	35	28	+7	33	
5	(Armenian Soviet Socialist Republic) Ararat Yerevan	30	11	10	9	37	28	+9	32	Qualification for Cup Winners' Cup first round
6	(Russian Soviet Federative Socialist Republic) Dynamo Moscow	30	10	11	9	42	33	+9	31	
7	(Russian Soviet Federative Socialist Republic) Zenit Leningrad	30	8	15	7	36	41	−5	31	
8	(Uzbek Soviet Socialist Republic) Pakhtakor Tashkent	30	10	10	10	45	44	+1	30	
9	(Georgian Soviet Socialist Republic) Dinamo Tbilisi	30	8	14	8	29	34	−5	30	
10	(Ukrainian Soviet Socialist Republic) Dnipro Dnipropetrovsk	30	9	11	10	31	39	−8	29	
11	(Ukrainian Soviet Socialist Republic) Karpaty Lviv	30	8	12	10	33	33	0	28	
12	(Ukrainian Soviet Socialist Republic) Shakhtar Donetsk	30	8	12	10	31	35	−4	28	
13	(Russian Soviet Federative Socialist Republic) CSKA Moscow	30	7	12	11	28	33	−5	26	
14	(Ukrainian Soviet Socialist Republic) Zarya Voroshilovgrad	30	8	10	12	32	41	−9	26	
15	(Kazakh Soviet Socialist Republic) Kairat Alma-Ata (R)	30	8	10	12	37	47	−10	26	Relegation to First League
16	(Moldavian Soviet Socialist Republic) Nistru Kishinev (R)	30	4	8	18	32	59	−27	16	Relegation to First League

(C) Champions; (R) Relegated

=== First League ===
Pos	Rep	Team	Pld	W	D	L	GF	GA	GD	Pts	Promotion or relegation
1	RUS	Lokomotiv Moskva	38	23	7	8	73	33	+40	53	Promoted
2	RUS	SKA Rostov-na-Donu	38	21	9	8	64	35	+29	51	Promoted
3	BLR	Dinamo Minsk	38	21	9	8	60	38	+22	51	
4	RUS	Krylya Sovetov Kuibyshev	38	20	8	10	65	41	+24	48	
5	AZE	Neftchi Baku	38	18	10	10	54	32	+22	46	
6	UKR	Tavria Simferopol	38	18	6	14	74	55	+19	42	
7	RUS	Kuzbass Kemerovo	38	19	4	15	48	50	−2	42	
8	GEO	Torpedo Kutaisi	38	14	10	14	37	42	−5	38	
9	TJK	Pamir Dushanbe	38	13	11	14	48	48	0	37	
10	RUS	Zvezda Perm	38	13	11	14	54	59	−5	37	
11	RUS	Shinnik Yaroslavl	38	11	14	13	50	53	−3	36	
12	UKR	Spartak Ivano-Frankovsk	38	9	16	13	37	39	−2	34	
13	UKR	Metallurg Zaporozhye	38	11	12	15	42	50	−8	34	
14	RUS	Spartak Nalchik	38	10	14	14	37	47	−10	34	
15	RUS	Kuban Krasnodar	38	12	10	16	54	67	−13	34	
16	RUS	UralMash Sverdlovsk	38	13	8	17	38	54	−16	34	
17	RUS	Spartak Orjonikidze	38	15	4	19	45	67	−22	34	
18	TKM	Stroitel Ashkhabad	38	11	11	16	50	52	−2	33	Relegated
19	RUS	Metallurg Lipetsk	38	8	9	21	30	58	−28	25	Relegated
20	RUS	Textilshchik Ivanovo	38	5	7	26	33	73	−40	17	Relegated

Source: rsssf.com

=== Second League (finals) ===
[Nov 20-30, Sochi]

Pos	Rep	Team	Pld	W	D	L	GF	GA	GD	Pts	Promotion
1	KGZ	Alga Frunze	5	2	3	0	3	1	+2	7	Promoted
2	RUS	Rubin Kazan	5	2	2	1	9	6	+3	6	Promoted
3	UKR	Metallist Kharkov	5	2	2	1	7	5	+2	6	Promoted
4	RUS	Terek Grozny	5	2	1	2	9	6	+3	5	
5	KAZ	Shakhtyor Karaganda	5	1	1	3	4	8	−4	3	
6	UZB	Yangiyer	5	0	3	2	4	10	−6	3	

Source: rsssf.com

=== Top goalscorers ===
Top League

- Oleg Blokhin (Dinamo Kiev) – 20 goals

First League

- Nikolay Klimov (Tavriya Simferopol), Aleksandr Markin (Zvezda Perm) – 25 goals

== Republican (union republics) level competitions ==
- Ukrainian SSR – Lokomotiv Zhdanov
- Estonian SSR – Narva Baltika
- Russian SFSR – none
- Latvian SSR – VEF Factory Riga
- Lithuanian SSR – Tauras Siauliai
- Belarusian SSR – BATE Borisov
- Moldavian SSR – Dinamo Chisinau
- Armenian SSR – SKIF Yerevan (Sports Club of the Physical Culture Institute)
- Georgian SSR – Metalurgi Rustavi
- Azerbaijan SSR – Araz Baku
- Kazakh SSR – Gornyak Nikolsky
- Uzbek SSR – Pakhtachi Gulistan
- Kirghiz SSR – Tekstilschik Osh
- Tajik SSR – SKIF Dushanbe (Sports Club of the Physical Culture Institute)
- Turkmen SSR – Avtomobilist Ashgabat
