= 1974 Soviet Cup =

1974 Cup of USSR in Football
Кубок СССР

Tournament details
- Country: Soviet Union
- Dates: March 6 – August 10

Final positions
- Champions: Dinamo Kiev
- Runners-up: Zaria Voroshilovgrad

The 1974 Soviet Cup was an association football cup competition of the Soviet Union. The winner of the competition, Dinamo Kiev, qualified for the continental tournament.

== Participating teams ==
Enter in First round		Enter in Qualification round
Vysshaya Liga 16/16 teams	Pervaya Liga 6/20 teams	Pervaya Liga 14/20 teams
✓ Spartak Moscow; ✓ Chernomorets Odessa; ✓ Torpedo Moscow; ✓ Ararat Yerevan; ✓ Dinamo Moscow; ✓ Zenit Leningrad; ✓ Pakhtakor Tashkent; ✓ Dinamo Tbilisi; ✓ Dnepr Dnepropetrovsk; ✓ Karpaty Lvov; ✓ Shakhter Donetsk; ✓ CSKA Moscow; ✓ Zaria Voroshilovgrad; ✓ Kairat Alma-Ata; ✓ Nistru Kishinev ✓ Dinamo Kiev	✓ SKA Rostov-na-Donu; ✓ Dinamo Minsk; ✓ Lokomotiv Moscow; ✓ Neftchi Baku; ✓ Metallurg Lipetsk; ✓ Metallurg Zaporozhye	✓ Shinnik Yaroslavl; ✓ Krylya Sovetov Kuibyshev; ✓ Torpedo Kutaisi; ✓ Spartak Ivano-Frankovsk; ✓ Zvezda Perm; ✓ Tekstilschik Ivanovo; ✓ Stroitel Ashkhabad; ✓ Pamir Dushanbe; ✓ Kuzbass Kemerovo; ✓ Spartak Nalchik; ✓ Spartak Ordzhonikidze; ✓ Kuban Krasnodar; ✓ Uralmash Sverdlovsk; ✓ Tavriya Simferopol

Source: []

Notes

- Dinamo Kiev started at quarterfinals instead of the first round.

== Competition schedule ==
=== Preliminary round ===
[Mar 6, 10] 
KRYLYA SOVETOV Kuibyshev   2-0  0-1  Spartak Ordzhonikidze
  [1. Ravil Aryapov 3, ?. Att: 1,000 (in Sochi)] 
  [2. Vladimir Mozzhukhin 68 (in Eshera)] 
Kuban Krasnodar            1-1  0-2  SPARTAK Ivano-Frankovsk 
  [1. Alexandr Podgornov 80 - Viktor Anistratov 65. Att: 7,000] 
  [2. Viktor Anistratov 2, Boris Streltsov 19. Att: 5,000] 
PAMIR Dushanbe             0-0  2-1  UralMash Sverdlovsk     [both legs in Dushanbe] 
  [1. Att: 5,000] 
  [2. Alexandr Pogorelov, Arsen Petrosov – Alexandr Zhuravlyov. Att: 8,000] 
Stroitel Ashkhabad         0-1  1-1  SPARTAK Nalchik 
  [1. Vitaliy Mirzoyev. Att: 1,500] 
  [2. Vasiliy Karpov - Abdul Mustafin. Att: 7,000] 
TAVRIA Simferopol          2-2  3-2  Kuzbass Kemerovo        [both legs in Simferopol]
  [1. Andrei Cheremisin 3, Vasiliy Ryashin (K) 24 og – Vasiliy Ryashin 25, Sergei Timofeyev 57. Att: 13,000] 
  [2. Nikolai Klimov 17, 30, Andrei Cheremisin 68 – Vladimir Razdayev 19, Vitaliy Razdayev 48. Att: 9,500] 
Torpedo Kutaisi            2-1  0-1  SHINNIK Yaroslavl 
  [1. Merab Chakhunashvili, Jemal Kherkhadze - Vladimir Korotkov. Att: 5,000 (in Leselidze)]
  [2. Valeriy Frolov 60. Att: 3,000 (in Adler)]
Zvezda Perm                1-1  0-3  TEXTILSHCHIK Ivanovo 
  [1. Vladimir Solovyov 64 pen – Alexandr Tulbin 53 pen. Att: 1,500 (in Sochi)]
  [2. Vladimir Savinov 44, Alexandr Tulbin 66, Mikhail Potapov 69. Att: 4,000 (in Kislovodsk)]

=== First round ===
[Mar 14, 17] 
Textilshchik Ivanovo       0-1  0-2  SPARTAK Moskva            [both legs in Sochi] 
  [1. Vladimir Redin 70. Att: 8,000] 
  [2. Valeriy Andreyev, Alexandr Kasimtsev. Att: 1,000] 
ZENIT Leningrad            2-0  1-0  Spartak Ivano-Frankovsk 
  [1. Georgiy Khromchenkov 13, 43. Att: 2,000 (in Sochi)] 
  [2. Mikhail Fokin 9. Att: 10,000] 
[Mar 14, 18] 
DNEPR Dnepropetrovsk       5-0  0-1  Krylya Sovetov Kuibyshev  [both legs in Sochi]
  [1. Pyotr Slobodyan 16, ?, Anatoliy Grinko 36, Valeriy Porkuyan 65, Stanislav Yevseyenko 81. Att: 5,000] 
  [2. Valeriy Korablyov. Att: 1,000] 
Karpaty Lvov               1-0  0-2  SKA Rostov-na-Donu    [aet] 
  [1. Lev Brovarskiy 38. Att: 30,000] 
  [2. Viktor Churkin 68, Yevgeniy Khrabrostin 107. Att: 25,000] 
Metallurg Lipetsk          0-0  0-1  DINAMO Moskva 
  [1. Att: 5,000 (in Sochi)] 
  [2. Vladimir Kozlov 78 pen. Att: 3,000 (in Leselidze)] 
Metallurg Zaporozhye       0-0  0-2  TORPEDO Moskva 
  [1. Att: 18,800] 
  [2. Vladimir Yurin 36, Vadim Nikonov 83. Att: 200 (in Adler)] 
NEFTCHI Baku               3-0  1-2  Pahtakor Tashkent 
  [1. Tofik Abbasov 19, 54, Nikolai Smolnikov 73. Att: 10,000] 
  [2. Abdulgani Nurmamedov 86 – Viktor Varyukhin 75, Berador Abduraimov 90 pen. Att: 25,000] 
Nistru Kishinev            0-0  0-3  CHERNOMORETS Odessa 
  [1. Att: 25,000] 
  [2. Viktor Tomashevskiy 72, Vladimir Dzyuba 77, Igor Ivanenko 86. Att: 20,000] 
Pamir Dushanbe             1-1  1-3  DINAMO Tbilisi 
  [1. Alexandr Pogorelov 43 – Vladimir Gutsayev 78. Att: 22,000] 
  [2. Arsen Petrosov 85 – David Kipiani 5, 11 pen, 83. Att: 30,000] 
SHAKHTYOR Donetsk          2-1  0-0  Lokomotiv Moskva 
  [1. Alexei Ovchinnikov (L) 8 og, Yuriy Vankevich 40 – Yuriy Chesnokov 42. Att: 14,000] 
  [2. Att: 200 (in Hosta)] 
Shinnik Yaroslavl          0-0  1-2  ARARAT Yerevan 
  [1. (in Adler)] 
  [2. Boris Rybin 52 - Eduard Markarov 21, Oganes Zanazanyan 22. Att: 32,000] 
Tavria Simferopol          2-1  0-1  KAYRAT Alma-Ata 
  [1. Nikolai Klimov 5, 55 – Anatoliy Ionkin 71. Att: 10,000] 
  [2. Anatoliy Ionkin 78 pen. (in Sochi)]
[Mar 14, 19] 
Dinamo Minsk               1-3  2-0  ZARYA Voroshilovgrad 
  [1. Vladimir Kurnev pen – Viktor Kuznetsov, Yuriy Yeliseyev, Anatoliy Shakun. Att: 1,500 (in Eshera)]
  [2. Igor Grigoryev 28, 66. Att: 5,000 (in Sochi)] 
[Mar 15, 19] 
CSKA Moskva                0-0  2-0  Spartak Nalchik 
  [1. Att: 10,000 (in Poti)] 
  [2. Alexandr Kozlovskikh 52, Boris Kopeikin ?. Att: 18,000]

=== Second round ===
[Apr 6, May 27] 
ARARAT Yerevan             2-0  1-1  Neftchi Baku 
  [1. Sergei Bondarenko, Oganes Zanazanyan. Att: 30,000] 
  [2. Arkadiy Andriasyan 82 – Tofik Abbasov 37. Att: 35,000] 
Chernomorets Odessa        0-2  1-2  DINAMO Tbilisi 
  [1. Vissarion Mchedlishvili 42, 47. Att: 32,000] 
  [2. Vladimir Grigoryev 66 – Vladimir Gutsayev 57, Givi Nodia ?. Att: 10,000] 
DINAMO Moskva              3-1  2-1  Zenit Leningrad 
  [1. Vladimir Kozlov 23, Anatoliy Baidachny 30, 70 – Anatoliy Zinchenko 58. Att: 25,000 (in Tashkent)]
  [2. Vadim Pavlenko 56, Gennadiy Yevryuzhikhin 57 – Vladimir Kazachonok 63. Att: 40,000] 
DNEPR Dnepropetrovsk       1-0  1-1  CSKA Moskva 
  [1. Anatoliy Grinko 74. Att: 25,000] 
  [2. Stanislav Yevseyenko 39 – Boris Kopeikin 41] 
Kayrat Alma-Ata            2-3  0-4  ZARYA Voroshilovgrad 
  [1. Georgiy Martyan 41, 46 – Yuriy Yeliseyev 11, 58, Yuriy Vasenin 76. Att: 30,000] 
  [2. Yuriy Yeliseyev 42, Anatoliy Kuksov 49, Viktor Stulchin 71, Sergei Andreyev 89. Att: 7,000] 
SHAKHTYOR Donetsk          2-0  2-0  SKA Rostov-na-Donu 
  [1. Alexandr Vasin 10, Anatoliy Konkov 76 pen. Att: 33,000] 
  [2. Vitaliy Starukhin 61, Alexandr Vasin 63. Att: 20,000] 
Torpedo Moskva             0-0  0-0  SPARTAK Moskva        [pen 6-7] 
  [1. Att: 6,000 (in Sochi)] 
  [2. Att: 16,000]

=== Quarterfinals ===
[Jun 15, 21] 
Ararat Yerevan             2-1  0-3  SHAKHTYOR Donetsk 
  [1. Arkadiy Andriasyan 10, Eduard Markarov 84 – Yuriy Dudinskiy 76. Att: 30,000] 
  [2. Vitaliy Starukhin 25, 81, Yuriy Dudinskiy 30. Att: 25,000] 
DINAMO Tbilisi             2-0  1-3  Dinamo Moskva         [pen 4-3] 
  [1. Ucha Kantaria 31, Manuchar Machaidze 37. Att: 15,000] 
  [2. Manuchar Machaidze 96 – Vladimir Kozlov 59, 82, Vadim Pavlenko 95. Att: 20,000] 
Dnepr Dnepropetrovsk       2-3  1-2  DINAMO Kiev 
  [1. Stanislav Yevseyenko 21, Pyotr Naida 89 pen – Yuriy Kovalyov 34, Oleg Blokhin 48, Vladimir Muntyan 54. Att: 20,000] 
  [2. Yuriy Solovyov 12 – Vitaliy Shevchenko 59, Leonid Buryak 64. Att: 30,000] 
Spartak Moskva             0-0  0-1  ZARYA Voroshilovgrad 
  [1. Att: 15,000] 
  [2. Gennadiy Shilin 64. Att: 15,000]

=== Semifinals ===
[Jun 28, Jul 5] 
DINAMO Kiev                1-0  0-0  Dinamo Tbilisi 
  [1. Oleg Blokhin 56. Att: 20,000] 
  [2. Att: 35,000] 
ZARYA Voroshilovgrad       2-1  2-3  Shakhtyor Donetsk 
  [1. Yuriy Yeliseyev 39, Viktor Kuznetsov 74 – Yuriy Gubich 62] 
  [2. Vladimir Belousov 16, Viktor Kuznetsov 51 – Yuriy Gubich 32, Vitaliy Starukhin 88, Vladimir Zakharov 90]

==== Final ====
10 August 1974

Dinamo Kiev	3 – 0 (a.e.t.)	Zaria Voroshilovgrad
Muntyan 92'; Blokhin 102'; Onyshchenko 118'	Report

Lenin's Central Stadium, Moscow
Attendance: 55,000
Referee: Valentin Lipatov (Moscow)

== See also ==
- 1974 Soviet Top League
- 1974 Soviet First League
- 1974 Soviet Second League
