= Quino Sierra =

Spanish footballer

Personal information
- Full name: Joaquín Sierra Vallejo
- Date of birth: 6 September 1945 (age 81)
- Place of birth: Seville, Spanish State
- Height: 1.79 m (5 ft 10 in)
- Position: Forward

Youth career
- Real Betis

Senior career*
Years	Team	Apps	(Gls)
1963–1971	Real Betis	152	(57)
1971–1976	Valencia	141	(41)
1976–1978	Cádiz	66	(17)

International career
1969–1972	Spain	7	(3)
- * Club domestic league appearances and goals

Joaquín "Quino" Sierra Vallejo (born 6 September 1945) is a Spanish former footballer who played as a forward and made seven appearances for the Spain national team.

== Career ==
Quino made his debut for Spain on 15 October 1969 in a 1970 FIFA World Cup qualification match against Finland, which finished as a 6–0 win, where he scored Spain's final goal of the match in the 85th minute. He went on to make seven appearances, scoring three goals, before making his last appearance on 11 October 1972 in the 1–0 win against Argentina.

== Career statistics ==
=== International ===
Spain
Year	Apps	Goals
1969	1	1
1971	2	2
1972	4	0
Total	7	3

=== International goals ===
No.	Date	Venue	Opponent	Score	Result	Competition
1	15 October 1969	Estadio Municipal José Antonio, La Línea, Spain	Finland	6–0	6–0	1970 FIFA World Cup qualification
2	24 November 1971	Estadio Los Cármenes, Granada, Spain	Cyprus	2–0	7–0	UEFA Euro 1972 qualifying
3	24 November 1971	Estadio Los Cármenes, Granada, Spain	Cyprus	3–0	7–0	UEFA Euro 1972 qualifying
