= Viktor Matviyenko =

Ukrainian footballer (1948–2018)

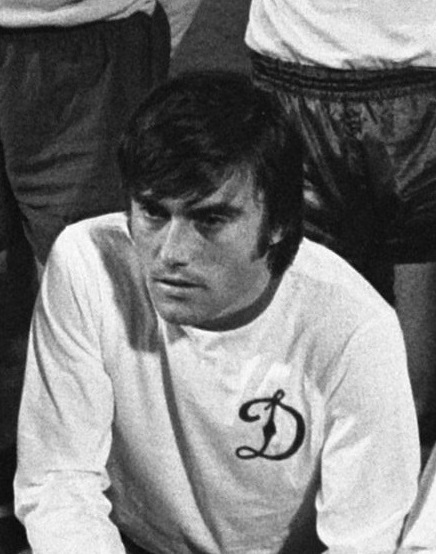
- Matviyenko in 1975

Personal information
- Full name: Viktor Antonovych Matviyenko
- Date of birth: 9 November 1948
- Place of birth: Zaporizhzhia, Ukrainian SSR (now Ukraine)
- Date of death: 29 November 2018 (aged 70)
- Place of death: Kyiv, Ukraine
- Position: Defender

Youth career
- Metalurh Zaporizhzhia

Senior career*
Years	Team	Apps	(Gls)
1966–1967	Metalurh Zaporizhzhia		
1968–1969	SKA Odesa	44	(1)
1970	Metalurh Zaporizhzhia	23	(1)
1970–1977	Dynamo Kyiv	188	(7)
1978	Dnipro Dnipropetrovsk	21	(1)

International career
1971–1972	Soviet Union	21	(0)

Managerial career
- 1979: Avanhard Rivne (assistant)
- 1980–1982: Avanhard Rivne
- 1985: Avanhard Rivne
- 1991–1992: Orlęta Łuków (Poland)
- 1993: Podillya Khmelnytskyi
- 1993: Torpedo Zaporizhzhia
- 1994: Bukovyna Chernivtsi
- 1995: Tiligul-Tiras Tiraspol
- 1996–1997: Torpedo Zaporizhzhia
- 1998: Dustlik
- 2001–2002: Stal Alchevsk (assistant)
Medal record
Men's football
Representing Soviet Union
Summer Olympics
Bronze medal – third place	1976 Montreal	Team competition
UEFA European Championship
Silver medal – second place	1972 Belgium
- * Club domestic league appearances and goals

Viktor Antonovych Matviyenko (Ukrainian: Віктор Антонович Матвієнко; 9 November 1948 – 29 November 2018) was a Soviet and Ukrainian football player and coach.

== International career ==
He earned 21 caps for the Soviet Union national team, and participated in UEFA Euro 1972. He also won a bronze medal in football at the 1976 Summer Olympics. He died 20 days after his 70th birthday in 2018.

== Career statistics ==
=== Club ===
Appearances and goals by club, season and competition
Club	Season	League		Cup		Europe		Total	
Club	Season	Apps	GS	Apps	GS	Apps	GS	Apps	GS
Metalurh Zaporizhia	1966	?	?	—		—		?	?
Metalurh Zaporizhia	1967	?	?	—		—		?	?
SKA Odessa	1968	10	0	2	0	—		12	0
SKA Odessa	1969	34	1	?	?	—		34	1
Metalurh Zaporizhia	1970	23	1	1	0	—		24	1
Dynamo Kyiv	1970	14	0	—		—		14	0
Dynamo Kyiv	1971	28	1	4	0	—		32	1
Dynamo Kyiv	1972	29	0	4	0	4	0	37	0
Dynamo Kyiv	1973	30	1	7	0	4	0	41	1
Dynamo Kyiv	1974	29	0	3	0	4	0	36	0
Dynamo Kyiv	1975	19	3	1	0	6	0	26	3
Dynamo Kyiv	1976 sp	2	0	—		2	0	4	0
Dynamo Kyiv	1976 au	12	0	1	0	4	0	17	0
Dynamo Kyiv	1977	25	2	2	0	6	0	33	2
Dnipro Dnipropetrovsk	1978	21	1	2	0	—		23	1
10 seasons in Vysshaya Liga		188	7	24	0	30	0	242	7

Notes:

- The table includes league and cup competitions of the All-Union level. It does not include competitions at the republican level.
- The 10-season totals include all games at the top tier, Soviet Cup, and European competitions.

== Honours ==
- Soviet Top League: 1971, 1974, 1975, 1977
- Soviet Cup: 1974
- UEFA Cup Winners' Cup: 1975
- UEFA Super Cup: 1975
- Olympic bronze: 1976
