= Volodymyr Veremeyev =

Soviet footballer (born 1948)

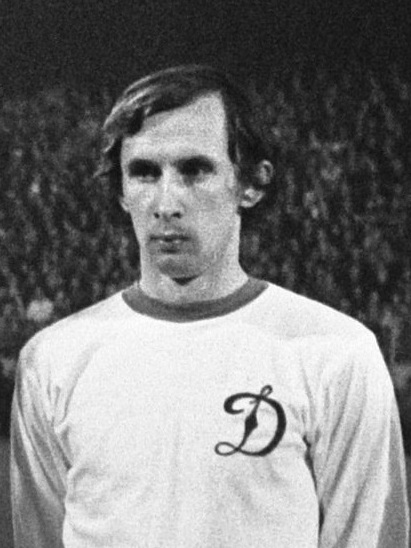
- Volodymyr Veremeyev in 1975

Personal information
- Full name: Volodymyr Hryhorovych Veremeyev
- Date of birth: 8 November 1948 (age 77)
- Place of birth: Spassk-Dalny, Russian SFSR, USSR
- Height: 1.78 m (5 ft 10 in)
- Position: Midfielder

Senior career*
Years	Team	Apps	(Gls)
1966–1967	FC Zirka Kirovohrad	24	(5)
1968–1982	FC Dynamo Kyiv	310	(33)
Total		334	(38)

International career
1973–1979	USSR	26	(2)

Managerial career
- 1985–1991: FC Dynamo Kyiv (director)
- 1991–1992: UAE (assistant)
- 1993: FC Dynamo Kyiv (vice-president)
- 1994–1996: Kuwait (assistant)
- 1997–2011: FC Dynamo Kyiv (consultant)
Medal record
Representing USSR
Men's Football
Bronze medal – third place	1976 Montreal	Team competition
- * Club domestic league appearances and goals

Volodymyr Hryhorovych Veremeyev (Ukrainian: Володимир Григорович Веремієв, Russian: Владимир Григорьевич Веремеев; born 8 November 1948) is a former Soviet and Ukrainian footballer. He spent all of his playing career in Ukraine.

== Career ==
During his career he played almost exclusively for FC Dynamo Kyiv and won the Soviet Top League in 1968, 1971, 1974, 1975, 1977, 1980 and 1981.vise championship 1969, 1972, 1973, 1976, 1978, 1982.

== Statistics for Dynamo Kiev ==
Club	Season	League		Cup		Europe		Super Cup		Total	
Club	Season	Apps	Goals	Apps	Goals	Apps	Goals	Apps	Goals	Apps	Goals
Dynamo Kiev	1967	-	-	1	0	-	-	-	-	1	0
Dynamo Kiev	1968	3	0	-	-	-	-	-	-	3	0
Dynamo Kiev	1969	3	0	-	-	-	-	-	-	3	0
Dynamo Kiev	1970	17	0	4	0	-	-	-	-	21	0
Dynamo Kiev	1971	28	3	2	0	-	-	-	-	30	3
Dynamo Kiev	1972	30	2	3	1	6	0	-	-	39	3
Dynamo Kiev	1973	30	5	8	1	6	1	-	-	44	7
Dynamo Kiev	1974	27	1	4	0	7	0	-	-	38	1
Dynamo Kiev	1975	28	3	1	0	6	0	-	-	35	3
Dynamo Kiev	1976 (s)	4	1	1	0	-	-	-	-	5	1
Dynamo Kiev	1976 (a)	2	0	-	-	1	0	-	-	3	0
Dynamo Kiev	1977	27	3	2	0	2	1	1	0	32	4
Dynamo Kiev	1978	24	3	7	0	4	1	-	-	35	4
Dynamo Kiev	1979	25	2	1	0	4	0	-	-	30	2
Dynamo Kiev	1980	28	6	6	0	2	0	-	-	36	6
Dynamo Kiev	1981	24	4	4	0	6	0	1	0	35	4
Dynamo Kiev	1982	10	0	1	0	-	-	-	-	11	0
Career total		310	33	45	2	44	3	2	0	401	38

- The statistics in USSR Cups and Europe is made under the scheme "autumn-spring" and enlisted in a year of start of tournaments.

=== International ===
As of match played 31 October 1979

Appearances and goals by national team and year
National Team	Year	Apps	Goals
Soviet Union	1973	1	0
Soviet Union	1974	2	0
Soviet Union	1975	7	1
Soviet Union	1976	9	1
Soviet Union	1977	3	0
Soviet Union	1978	3	0
Soviet Union	1979	1	0
Total		26	2

Scores and results list the Soviet Union's goal tally first, score column indicates score after each Veremeyev goal.

List of international goals scored by Volodymyr Veremeyev
No.	Date	Venue	Opponent	Score	Result	Competition
1	12 November 1975	Central Stadium, Kiev, Soviet Union	Switzerland	4–1	4–1	UEFA Euro 1976 Qualifying
2	23 July 1976	Lansdowne Park, Ottawa, Canada	North Korea	2–0	3–0	XXI. Olympic Games Final Tournament 1976
