= Stefanis Michael =

Cypriot footballer (born 1946)

Personal information
- Full name: Stefanis Michael
- Date of birth: 8 November 1946 (age 80)
- Place of birth: Cyprus
- Position: Midfielder

Senior career*
Years	Team	Apps	(Gls)
1968–1978	APOEL		

International career
1968–1978	Cyprus	35	(2)
- * Club domestic league appearances and goals

Stefanis Michael (Greek: Στεφανής Μιχαήλ; born 8 November 1946) is a Cypriot former footballer who played as a midfielder and made 35 appearances for the Cyprus national team.

== Career ==
Michael made his debut for Cyprus on 23 November 1968 in a 1970 FIFA World Cup qualification match against West Germany, which finished as a 0–1 loss. He went on to make 35 appearances, scoring 2 goals, before making his last appearance on 11 January 1978 in a friendly match against Greece, which finished as a 0–2 loss.

== Career statistics ==
=== International ===
Cyprus
Year	Apps	Goals
1968	2	0
1969	4	0
1970	1	0
1971	5	1
1972	3	0
1973	3	0
1974	1	0
1975	8	0
1976	4	1
1977	3	0
1978	1	0
Total	35	2

=== International goals ===
No.	Date	Venue	Opponent	Score	Result	Competition
1	7 June 1971	Central Lenin Stadium, Moscow, Soviet Union	Soviet Union	1–4	1–6	UEFA Euro 1972 qualifying
2	23 May 1976	Tsirio Stadium, Limassol, Cyprus	Denmark	1–0	1–5	1978 FIFA World Cup qualification
