= Ostap Savka =

Ukrainian footballer (1947–2022)

Personal information
- Full name: Ostap Volodymyrovych Savka
- Date of birth: 4 April 1947
- Place of birth: Drohobych, Drohobych Oblast, Ukrainian SSR
- Date of death: 10 August 2022 (aged 75)
- Place of death: Lviv, Ukraine
- Height: 1.78 m (5 ft 10 in)
- Position: Midfielder

Youth career
- Naftovyk Drohobych

Senior career*
Years	Team	Apps	(Gls)
1965–1967	Naftovyk Drohobych	82	(1)
1967–1969	Shakhtar Donetsk	26	(0)
1970–1977	Karpaty Lviv	195	(16)
1977–1978	Sokil Lviv	?	(?)
1979	Kolos Nikopol	19	(0)
1980	Krystal Kherson	39	(2)
- * Club domestic league appearances and goals

Ostap Volodymyrovych Savka (Ukrainian: Остап Володимирович Савка; 4 April 1947 – 10 August 2022) was a Ukrainian professional footballer who played as midfielder.

== Career ==
Born in Drohobych, Savka began his football career in Naftovyk in his native city. In the 1968–69 season, he played 26 matches for FC Shakhtar Donetsk and transferred from there to Karpaty Lviv, later becoming a captain of this club (in nine seasons in the team, he played 194 matches and scored 16 goals, played in the debut European Cup campaign of Karpaty in 1970).

After the end of his career, Savka, whose last clubs were Kolos Nikopol and Krystal Kherson, worked as a children football trainer in the Youth Sportive School #4 in Lviv. Among his pupils were Ukrainian football players Oleh Tymchyshyn and Andriy Klymenko.

Savka died in Lviv on 10 August 2022, at the age of 75.
