= Valeriy Zuyev =

Ukrainian footballer (1952–2016)

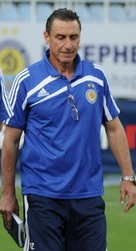
- Zuyev in 2010

Personal information
- Full name: Valeriy Leonidovych Zuyev
- Date of birth: 7 November 1952
- Place of birth: Kyiv, Ukrainian SSR
- Date of death: 6 May 2016 (aged 63)
- Place of death: Kyiv, Ukraine
- Height: 1.81 m (5 ft 11 in)
- Position: Defender

Youth career
- 1963–1969: FC Dynamo Kyiv

Senior career*
Years	Team	Apps	(Gls)
1969–1979	FC Dynamo Kyiv	68	(1)
1980–1981	FC SKA Rostov-on-Don	47	(0)
1981	SKA Kyiv	22	(0)
1982–1983	FC Dnipro Dnipropetrovsk	28	(0)

International career
1975	USSR	1	(0)

Managerial career
- 1993–1994: FC Dynamo-2 Kyiv (assistant)
- 1995: Ukraine (assistant)
- 1995–1997: FC Dynamo Kyiv (assistant)
- 1997–2000: FC Dynamo-2 Kyiv
- 2000–2002: FC Dynamo-2 Kyiv (assistant)
- 2002–2012: FC Dynamo Kyiv (assistant)
- 2013: SC Tavriya Simferopol (assistant)
- * Club domestic league appearances and goals

Valeriy Zuyev (Ukrainian: Валерій Леонідович Зуєв; November 5, 1952 – 6 May 2016) was a Ukrainian football player and coach.

== Honours ==
- Soviet Top League winner: 1974, 1975, 1977, 1983.
- Soviet Cup winner: 1974, 1978, 1981.
- UEFA Cup Winners' Cup winner: 1975.
- UEFA Super Cup winner: 1975.

== International career ==
Zuyev played his only game for USSR on November 23, 1975, in a UEFA Euro 1976 qualifier against Turkey.

== Death ==
Valeriy Zuyev died on 6 May 2016, after a long illness.
