= Enrique Lora =

Spanish footballer

Personal information
- Full name: Enrique Lora Millán
- Date of birth: 7 May 1945 (age 81)
- Place of birth: La Puebla del Río, Spain
- Height: 1.62 m (5 ft 4 in)
- Position: Midfielder

Youth career
- Sevilla

Senior career*
Years	Team	Apps	(Gls)
- Hispalense
- Coria
- Sevilla Atlético
1966–1977	Sevilla	293	(27)
1977–1979	Recreativo Huelva	61	(4)
Total		354+	(31+)

International career
1970–1972	Spain	14	(1)
- * Club domestic league appearances and goals

Enrique Lora Millán (born 7 May 1945) is a Spanish former footballer who played as a midfielder.

He spent most of his career at Sevilla, making 334 appearances and scoring 30 goals over 11 seasons. He totalled 205 games in La Liga and 149 in the Segunda División, including a season with Recreativo de Huelva in each at the end of his career.

Lora played 14 games for Spain between 1970 and 1972, scoring one goal.

== Club career ==
Born in La Puebla del Río in the Province of Seville, Lora grew up in a household more interested in bullfighting than in football. As a child, he played football on the wing to avoid the physical side of the game, due to his small physique.

Lora was taken on as a youth player at Sevilla. He worked as a labourer in cotton, rice and corn fields; the club gave him 70 Spanish pesetas for public transport fares, of which he would save 35 by riding his bicycle home. Released at age 18, he stopped playing football altogether until he was brought back by friends at local club Hispalense, going on to play in the Tercera División for Coria. At the end of his contract, he was approached by Seville-based Real Betis, but delayed his signing because he wanted his 30,000 peseta fee in cash. In the meantime, he signed for Sevilla Atlético, the reserve team of Sevilla FC.

Lora made his debut in La Liga on 25 September 1966 in a 3–1 home win over fellow Andalusians Granada. On 4 December, he scored his first goals, two in a 4–0 win at the Ramón Sánchez Pizjuán Stadium against another neighbour, Córdoba.

In the late 1960s, Sevilla were managed by Austrian Max Merkel, who Lora credited with improving his athleticism, with the player earning the nickname "Siete Pulmones" (Seven Lungs). After winning promotion as Segunda División champions in 1968–69, Lora's team came third in La Liga the following season, the first promoted team to achieve such a high position. He was never sent off for the club, and only received a yellow card once. In November 2014, he was the seventh player to have a "Dorsal de Leyenda" (Legend Squad Number) issued by the club. As of May 2024, his 334 appearances put him 10th in the club's all-time list.

Lora was released by Sevilla in 1977, despite intending to retire there. He then signed for Segunda División club Recreativo de Huelva, winning promotion as champion in his first season. Having helped the club into the top flight for the first time in its long history, he received a bonus of 500,000 pesetas, per a clause in his contract that the club had not expected to pay.

== International career ==
Spain manager László Kubala admired Lora for his strength, discipline and consistency at the expense of height. He made his international debut on 11 February 1970 in a 2–0 friendly win over West Germany at his club ground. His inclusion had been criticised in the media as a way to entertain local fans, but he was subsequently praised for his marking of Gunter Netzer.

Lora played 14 games for Spain, scoring once on 24 November 1971 in a 7–0 UEFA Euro 1972 qualifier at home to Cyprus in Granada. In his final game on 19 October 1972, a 2–2 home draw with Yugoslavia in 1974 FIFA World Cup qualification, Kubala brought him on as a half-time substitute for Juan Sol only to replace him 24 minutes later with José Ufarte. In 2020, Lora said that he had been distracted by contract negotiations at Sevilla, causing his poor performance in this match.
