= Viktor Kolotov =

Soviet footballer (1949–2000)

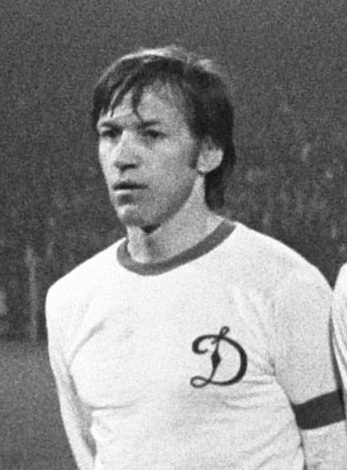
- Viktor Kolotov in 1975

Personal information
- Full name: Viktor Mikhailovich Kolotov
- Date of birth: 3 July 1949
- Place of birth: Yudino, Tatar ASSR, Soviet Union (now part of Kazan, Russia)
- Date of death: 3 January 2000 (aged 50)
- Place of death: Kyiv, Ukraine
- Height: 1.80 m (5 ft 11 in)
- Position: Midfielder

Youth career
- 1958: Lokomotiv Yudino

Senior career*
| Years | Team | Apps | (Gls) |
| 1967–1968 | Chaika Zelenodolsk | | |
| 1968 | Trudovye Rezervy Kazan | | |
| 1968–1970 | Rubin Kazan | 69 | (15) |
| 1971–1981 | Dynamo Kyiv | 218 | (62) |

International career
| 1970–1978 | USSR | 54 | (22) |
| 1979 | Ukraine | | |

Managerial career
- 1984–1992: Dynamo Kyiv (assistant)
- 1993: Borysfen Boryspil
- 1995–1996: Ukraine U21
- 1996–1997: Prykarpattia Ivano-Frankivsk
- 1998–1999: Ukraine U21
Medal record
Representing Soviet Union
Men's Football
Olympic Games
| Bronze medal – third place | 1972 Munich | Team competition |
| Bronze medal – third place | 1976 Montreal | Team competition |
UEFA European Championship
| Silver medal – second place | European Championship | 1972 |
- * Club domestic league appearances and goals

Viktor Mikhailovich Kolotov (Russian: Виктор Михайлович Колотов; Ukrainian: Віктор Михайлович Колотов; 3 July 1949 – 3 January 2000) was a Soviet footballer who played as a midfielder and later Ukrainian manager.

He was born in the settlement of Yudino, Kazan municipality. Today, the settlement is included in the Kirov Raion of Kazan city. After becoming a coach, he extended his welcome stay in Kyiv. Together with Dynamo Kyiv, he became the four-time champion of the USSR as well as the two-time holder of the USSR Cup. Also in Europe, he participated in the memorable 1974–1975 season when Dynamo Kyiv conquered the Cup Winners' Cup and the UEFA Super Cup. Kolotov was also a European vice-champion (1972).

In 1979, Kolotov played couple of games for Ukraine at the Spartakiad of the Peoples of the USSR.

== Career statistics for Dynamo Kyiv ==
| Club | Season | League | | Cup | | Europe | | Super Cup | | Total | |
| Club | Season | Apps | Goals | Apps | Goals | Apps | Goals | Apps | Goals | Apps | Goals |
|---|---|---|---|---|---|---|---|---|---|---|---|
| Dynamo Kyiv | 1971 | 25 | 10 | - | - | - | - | - | - | 25 | 10 |
| Dynamo Kyiv | 1972 | 26 | 11 | 4 | 0 | 6 | 0 | - | - | 36 | 11 |
| Dynamo Kyiv | 1973 | 23 | 6 | 6 | 6 | 5 | 2 | - | - | 34 | 14 |
| Dynamo Kyiv | 1974 | 28 | 7 | 4 | 0 | 9 | 2 | - | - | 41 | 9 |
| Dynamo Kyiv | 1975 | 25 | 12 | 1 | 1 | 4 | 2 | - | - | 30 | 15 |
| Dynamo Kyiv | 1976 (s) | 3 | 0 | - | - | - | - | - | - | 3 | 0 |
| Dynamo Kyiv | 1976 (a) | 7 | 3 | - | - | 2 | 2 | - | - | 9 | 5 |
| Dynamo Kyiv | 1977 | 15 | 5 | - | - | 2 | 0 | 1 | 0 | 18 | 5 |
| Dynamo Kyiv | 1978 | 23 | 2 | 7 | 1 | 4 | 0 | - | - | 34 | 3 |
| Dynamo Kyiv | 1979 | 28 | 5 | 6 | 3 | 6 | 0 | - | - | 40 | 8 |
| Dynamo Kyiv | 1980 | 11 | 1 | 1 | 0 | 1 | 0 | - | - | 13 | 1 |
| Dynamo Kyiv | 1981 | 4 | 0 | 5 | 0 | - | - | - | - | 9 | 0 |
| Total | | 218 | 62 | 34 | 11 | 39 | 8 | 1 | 0 | 292 | 81 |

- The statistics in USSR Cups and Europe is made under the scheme "autumn-spring" and enlisted in a year of start of tournaments

== Honours ==
Dynamo Kyiv

- Soviet Top League (6): 1971, 1974, 1975, 1977, 1980, 1981
- Soviet Cup (2): 1974, 1978
- European Cup Winners' Cup (1): 1974–75
- European Super Cup (1): 1975

Individual

- The best 33 football players of the Soviet Union (7): No. 1 (1971, 1972, 1974-1976), No. 2 (1977), No. 3 (1973)
- ADN Eastern European Footballer of the Season: 1972
- Eric Batty's World XI: 1976
