= Erik Beijar =

Finnish footballer (1921-1993)

Erik Edvin Beijar (12 May 1921 – 8 November 1993) was a Finnish footballer who competed in the 1952 Summer Olympics. He was born and died in Vaasa.
