= 1974 Soviet Second League =

Second League
- Season: 1974

1974 Soviet Second League was a Soviet competition in the Soviet Second League. There were 116 teams split in 6 groups.

== Qualifying groups ==
=== Group I [Central Asia] ===
Pos	Rep	Team	Pld	W	D	L	GF	GA	GD	Pts
1	KGZ	Alga Frunze	30	16	10	4	46	18	+28	42
2	UZB	Yangiyer	30	18	3	9	57	25	+32	39
3	KAZ	Shakhtyor Karaganda	30	14	10	6	53	34	+19	38
4	UZB	Neftyanik Fergana	30	17	3	10	38	29	+9	37
5	KAZ	Traktor Pavlodar	30	10	14	6	36	27	+9	34
6	KAZ	Vostok Ust-Kamenogorsk	30	11	10	9	38	27	+11	32
7	UZB	Spartak Termez (Note: Avtomobilist Termez changed name to Spartak.)	30	10	12	8	41	36	+5	32
8	UZB	Yangiaryk	30	11	9	10	27	33	−6	31
9	KAZ	Orbita Kzil-Orda (Note: Avtomobilist Kzil-Orda changed name to Orbita.)	30	10	9	11	41	37	+4	29
10	UZB	Trud Jizak	30	10	8	12	42	35	+7	28
11	KAZ	Dinamo Tselinograd	30	8	10	12	26	37	−11	26
12	KAZ	Alatau Jambul	30	8	10	12	27	39	−12	26
13	KAZ	Spartak Semipalatinsk	30	9	6	15	30	41	−11	24
14	UZB	Andizhanets Andizhan	30	8	7	15	20	48	−28	23
15	KAZ	Metallurg Chimkent	30	6	10	14	32	58	−26	22
16	TKM	Amu-Darya Charjou	30	6	5	19	23	53	−30	17

=== Group II [Centre and Northwest] ===
Pos	Rep	Team	Pld	W	D	L	GF	GA	GD	Pts
1	RUS	Dinamo Leningrad	40	26	10	4	70	25	+45	62
2	LVA	Daugava Riga	40	24	11	5	76	28	+48	59
3	RUS	Volga Gorkiy	40	24	9	7	64	32	+32	57
4	RUS	Spartak Ryazan	40	19	12	9	50	28	+22	50
5	RUS	Spartak Kostroma	40	20	9	11	61	44	+17	49
6	RUS	Lokomotiv Kaluga	40	19	11	10	44	30	+14	49
7	LTU	Atlantas Klaipeda	40	17	9	14	52	39	+13	43
8	LTU	Žalgiris Vilnius	40	14	15	11	50	40	+10	43
9	RUS	Volga Kalinin	40	17	8	15	59	48	+11	42
10	RUS	Metallurg Tula	40	15	11	14	42	51	−9	41
11	BLR	GomSelMash Gomel	40	13	13	14	53	57	−4	39
12	BLR	Dnepr Mogilyov	40	14	10	16	37	53	−16	38
13	RUS	Dinamo Kirov	40	12	11	17	34	39	−5	35
14	BLR	Bug Brest	40	10	14	16	33	44	−11	34
15	RUS	Electron Novgorod	40	8	18	14	32	44	−12	34
16	LVA	Zvejnieks Liepaja	40	11	11	18	26	42	−16	33
17	RUS	Baltika Kaliningrad	40	12	9	19	41	60	−19	33
18	RUS	Mashinostroitel Pskov	40	11	8	21	40	56	−16	30
19	RUS	Sever Murmansk	40	11	7	22	38	65	−27	29
20	BLR	Dvina Vitebsk	40	6	13	21	20	47	−27	25
21	BLR	Khimik Grodno	40	3	9	28	21	71	−50	15

=== Group III [Centre and Greater Caucasus] ===
Pos	Rep	Team	Pld	W	D	L	GF	GA	GD	Pts
1	RUS	Torpedo Vladimir	38	21	12	5	62	27	+35	54
2	GEO	Dinamo Batumi	38	20	12	6	55	29	+26	52
3	GEO	Dila Gori	38	22	7	9	86	41	+45	51
4	RUS	Dinamo Vologda	38	21	9	8	62	38	+24	51
5	RUS	Iskra Smolensk	38	20	9	9	59	31	+28	49
6	RUS	Uralan Elista	38	20	7	11	52	37	+15	47
7	RUS	Khimik Dzerzhinsk	38	16	11	11	54	35	+19	43
8	RUS	Dinamo Stavropol	38	16	9	13	60	40	+20	41
9	GEO	Lokomotiv Samtredia	38	16	9	13	46	53	−7	41
10	AZE	Dinamo Kirovabad	38	17	5	16	57	52	+5	39
11	GEO	Guria Lanchkhuti	38	10	17	11	56	53	+3	37
12	RUS	Dinamo Bryansk	38	15	7	16	47	48	−1	37
13	GEO	Dinamo Zugdidi	38	14	6	18	50	67	−17	34
14	GEO	Mertskhali Makharadze	38	11	12	15	42	62	−20	34
15	ARM	Shirak Leninakan	38	13	7	18	54	67	−13	33
16	RUS	Kalitva Belaya Kalitva	38	12	7	19	38	50	−12	31
17	GEO	Kolkhida Poti	38	11	8	19	38	58	−20	30
18	RUS	Khimik Novomoskovsk	38	10	3	25	37	63	−26	23
19	ARM	Lori Kirovakan	38	4	9	25	27	82	−55	17
20	AZE	Hazar Sumgait (Note: Polad Sumgait changed name to Hazar.)	38	6	4	28	26	75	−49	16

=== Group IV [Central Strip and Ural] ===
Pos	Team	Pld	W	D	L	GF	GA	GD	Pts	Qualification
1	Terek Grozny	40	24	10	6	65	32	+33	58	
2	Rubin Kazan	40	20	11	9	53	33	+20	51	
3	Avangard Kursk	40	21	8	11	60	39	+21	50	
4	Torpedo Togliatti	40	20	9	11	37	28	+9	49	
5	Druzhba Maykop	40	20	8	12	55	34	+21	48	
6	Dinamo Makhachkala	40	20	8	12	61	47	+14	48	
7	Volgar Astrakhan	40	17	11	12	47	36	+11	45	
8	Mashuk Pyatigorsk	40	17	10	13	43	40	+3	44	
9	Stal Oryol	40	16	10	14	49	40	+9	42	
10	Lokomotiv Orenburg	40	15	12	13	50	48	+2	42	
11	Metallurg Magnitogorsk	40	16	10	14	49	48	+1	42	
12	Trud Voronezh	40	14	12	14	35	36	−1	40	
13	Salyut Belgorod	40	15	8	17	38	47	−9	38	
14	Sokol Saratov	40	12	12	16	46	52	−6	36	
15	Spartak Yoshkar-Ola	40	10	15	15	38	46	−8	35	
16	Zenit Izhevsk	40	14	7	19	33	48	−15	35	
17	Revtrud Tambov	40	8	16	16	30	55	−25	32	
18	Volga Ulyanovsk	40	11	9	20	38	71	−33	31	
19	Barrikady Volgograd	40	12	5	23	40	56	−16	29	
20	Stroitel Ufa	40	8	9	23	25	56	−31	25	
21	Kord Balakovo	40	8	4	28	25	24	+1	20	Withdrew

=== Group V [Siberia and the Far East] ===
Pos	Team	Pld	W	D	L	GF	GA	GD	Pts
1	Dinamo Barnaul	34	18	11	5	60	22	+38	47
2	Vulkan Petropavlovsk-Kamchatskiy	34	20	6	8	49	22	+27	46
3	Amur Blagoveshchensk	34	18	10	6	45	24	+21	46
4	Luch Vladivostok	34	19	7	8	68	33	+35	45
5	SKA Khabarovsk	34	17	9	8	57	40	+17	43
6	Uralets Nizhniy Tagil	34	15	7	12	53	39	+14	37
7	Chkalovets Novosibirsk	34	14	9	11	48	37	+11	37
8	Avtomobilist Krasnoyarsk	34	15	6	13	43	38	+5	36
9	Selenga Ulan-Ude	34	12	12	10	37	35	+2	36
10	Neftyanik Tyumen	34	12	11	11	41	42	−1	35
11	Irtysh Omsk	34	13	8	13	38	47	−9	34
12	Zauralets Kurgan	34	12	8	14	38	38	0	32
13	Sakhalin Yuzhno-Sakhalinsk	34	10	9	15	28	37	−9	29
14	Torpedo Tomsk (Note: TomLes Tomsk changed name to Torpedo.)	34	11	6	17	28	54	−26	28
15	Lokomotiv Chita (Note: SKA Chita were replaced by Lokomotiv Chita.)	34	7	11	16	20	39	−19	25
16	Shakhtyor Prokopyevsk	34	6	9	19	23	56	−33	21
17	Aviator Irkutsk (Note: Aeroflot Irkutsk changed name to Aviator.)	34	7	6	21	31	63	−32	20
18	Lokomotiv Chelyabinsk	34	5	5	24	23	64	−41	15

=== Group VI (Ukraine) ===
Pos	Team	Pld	W	D	L	GF	GA	GD	Pts	Promotion or relegation
1	Sudnobudivnyk Mykolaiv (C)	38	19	17	2	47	18	+29	55	
2	Metalist Kharkiv (P)	38	15	15	8	63	42	+21	45	Promoted
3	Kryvbas Kryvyi Rih	38	15	14	9	47	33	+14	44	
4	Frunzenets Sumy	38	18	8	12	54	41	+13	44	
5	Hoverla Uzhhorod	38	16	12	10	45	38	+7	44	
6	SC Chernihiv	38	17	9	12	63	46	+17	43	
7	Lokomotyv Vinnytsia	38	14	14	10	48	33	+15	42	
8	Avtomobilist Zhytomyr	38	15	11	12	50	39	+11	41	
9	SC Lutsk	38	14	12	12	33	31	+2	40	
10	Lokomotyv Kherson	38	13	13	12	49	48	+1	39	
11	FC Tiraspol	38	9	21	8	40	40	0	39	
12	Bukovyna Chernivtsi	38	14	10	14	51	45	+6	38	
13	Avanhard Sevastopol	38	14	9	15	46	47	−1	37	
14	Dynamo Khmelnytskyi	38	11	14	13	32	38	−6	36	
15	Kolos Poltava	38	9	17	12	25	29	−4	35	
16	Hranit Cherkasy	38	9	16	13	32	49	−17	34	Excluded
17	Zirka Kirovohrad	38	11	9	18	34	46	−12	31	
18	Avanhard Rovno	38	12	6	20	33	52	−19	30	
19	Budivelnyk Ternopil	38	8	10	20	31	49	−18	26	Relegated
20	Pischevik Bendery	38	5	6	27	14	73	−59	16	Relegated

(C) Champions; (P) Promoted

== Promotion playoffs ==
=== Semifinal Group 1 ===
[Frunze]

Pos	Rep	Team	Pld	W	D	L	GF	GA	GD	Pts
1	KGZ	Alga Frunze	5	4	1	0	14	3	+11	9
2	RUS	Rubin Kazan	5	3	0	2	7	7	0	6
3	RUS	Amur Blagoveshchensk	5	2	1	2	8	7	+1	5
4	RUS	Dinamo Leningrad	5	2	0	3	6	8	−2	4
5	UKR	Krivbass Krivoi Rog	5	0	3	2	3	5	−2	3
6	GEO	Dinamo Batumi	5	1	1	3	6	14	−8	3

=== Semifinal Group 2 ===
[Grozny]

Pos	Rep	Team	Pld	W	D	L	GF	GA	GD	Pts
1	RUS	Terek Grozny	5	3	2	0	8	4	+4	8
2	UZB	Yangiyer	5	2	3	0	5	2	+3	7
3	GEO	Dila Gori	5	2	1	2	4	5	−1	5
4	RUS	Vulkan Petropavlovsk-Kamchatskiy	5	1	2	2	4	6	−2	4
5	RUS	Volga Gorkiy	5	1	1	3	4	6	−2	3
6	UKR	Sudostroitel Nikolayev	5	1	1	3	4	6	−2	3

=== Semifinal Group 3 ===
[Kharkov]

Pos	Rep	Team	Pld	W	D	L	GF	GA	GD	Pts
1	UKR	Metallist Kharkov	5	3	1	1	6	2	+4	7
2	KAZ	Shakhtyor Karaganda	5	3	1	1	6	3	+3	7
3	RUS	Torpedo Vladimir	5	3	1	1	8	8	0	7
4	LVA	Daugava Riga	5	0	4	1	1	2	−1	4
5	RUS	Dinamo Barnaul	5	1	1	3	4	6	−2	3
6	RUS	Avangard Kursk	5	0	2	3	4	8	−4	2

Source: rsssf.com

=== Final group ===
[Nov 20-30, Sochi]

Pos	Rep	Team	Pld	W	D	L	GF	GA	GD	Pts	Promotion
1	KGZ	Alga Frunze	5	2	3	0	3	1	+2	7	Promoted
2	RUS	Rubin Kazan	5	2	2	1	9	6	+3	6	Promoted
3	UKR	Metallist Kharkov	5	2	2	1	7	5	+2	6	Promoted
4	RUS	Terek Grozny	5	2	1	2	9	6	+3	5	
5	KAZ	Shakhtyor Karaganda	5	1	1	3	4	8	−4	3	
6	UZB	Yangiyer	5	0	3	2	4	10	−6	3	

Source: rsssf.com
