= 1974 Soviet First League =

Soviet First League
- Season: 1974

The 1974 Soviet First League was the fourth season of the Soviet First League and the 34th season of the Soviet second-tier league competition.

== Final standings ==
| Pos | Rep | Team | Pld | W | D | L | GF | GA | GD | Pts | Promotion or relegation |
|---|---|---|---|---|---|---|---|---|---|---|---|
| 1 | RUS | (Russian Soviet Federative Socialist Republic) Lokomotiv Moscow | 38 | 23 | 7 | 8 | 73 | 33 | +40 | 53 | Promoted |
| 2 | RUS | (Russian Soviet Federative Socialist Republic) SKA Rostov-on-Don | 38 | 21 | 9 | 8 | 64 | 35 | +29 | 51 | Promoted |
| 3 | BLR | (Byelorussian Soviet Socialist Republic) Dinamo Minsk | 38 | 21 | 9 | 8 | 60 | 38 | +22 | 51 | |
| 4 | RUS | (Russian Soviet Federative Socialist Republic) Krylia Sovetov Kuibyshev | 38 | 20 | 8 | 10 | 65 | 41 | +24 | 48 | |
| 5 | AZE | (Azerbaijan Soviet Socialist Republic) Neftçi Baku | 38 | 18 | 10 | 10 | 54 | 32 | +22 | 46 | |
| 6 | UKR | (Ukrainian Soviet Socialist Republic) Tavriya Simferopol | 38 | 18 | 6 | 14 | 74 | 55 | +19 | 42 | |
| 7 | RUS | (Russian Soviet Federative Socialist Republic) Kuzbass Kemerovo | 38 | 19 | 4 | 15 | 48 | 50 | −2 | 42 | |
| 8 | GEO | (Georgian Soviet Socialist Republic) Torpedo Kutaisi | 38 | 14 | 10 | 14 | 37 | 42 | −5 | 38 | |
| 9 | TJK | (Tajik Soviet Socialist Republic) Pamir Dushanbe | 38 | 13 | 11 | 14 | 48 | 48 | 0 | 37 | |
| 10 | RUS | (Russian Soviet Federative Socialist Republic) Zvezda Perm | 38 | 13 | 11 | 14 | 54 | 59 | −5 | 37 | |
| 11 | RUS | (Russian Soviet Federative Socialist Republic) Shinnik Yaroslavl | 38 | 11 | 14 | 13 | 50 | 53 | −3 | 36 | |
| 12 | UKR | (Ukrainian Soviet Socialist Republic) Spartak Ivano-Frankivsk | 38 | 9 | 16 | 13 | 37 | 39 | −2 | 34 | |
| 13 | UKR | (Ukrainian Soviet Socialist Republic) Metalurh Zaporizhzhia | 38 | 11 | 12 | 15 | 42 | 50 | −8 | 34 | |
| 14 | RUS | (Russian Soviet Federative Socialist Republic) Spartak Nalchik | 38 | 10 | 14 | 14 | 37 | 47 | −10 | 34 | |
| 15 | RUS | (Russian Soviet Federative Socialist Republic) Kuban Krasnodar | 38 | 12 | 10 | 16 | 54 | 67 | −13 | 34 | |
| 16 | RUS | (Russian Soviet Federative Socialist Republic) Uralmash Sverdlovsk | 38 | 13 | 8 | 17 | 38 | 54 | −16 | 34 | |
| 17 | RUS | (Russian Soviet Federative Socialist Republic) Spartak Orzhonikidze | 38 | 15 | 4 | 19 | 45 | 67 | −22 | 34 | |
| 18 | TKM | (Turkmen Soviet Socialist Republic) Stroitel Ashgabad | 38 | 11 | 11 | 16 | 50 | 52 | −2 | 33 | Relegated |
| 19 | RUS | (Russian Soviet Federative Socialist Republic) Metallurg Lipetsk | 38 | 8 | 9 | 21 | 30 | 58 | −28 | 25 | Relegated |
| 20 | RUS | (Russian Soviet Federative Socialist Republic) Tekstilshchik Ivanovo | 38 | 5 | 7 | 26 | 33 | 73 | −40 | 17 | Relegated |

Source: rsssf.com

== Number of teams by union republic ==
| Rank | Union republic | Number of teams | Club(s) |
|---|---|---|---|
| 1 | RSFSR | 12 | Lokomotiv Moscow, SKA Rostov-na-Donu, Krylia Sovetov Kuibyshev, Kuzbass Kemerevo, Zvezda Perm, Shinnik Yaroslavl, Elbrus Nalchik, Kuban Krasnodar, Uralmash Sverdlovsk, Spartak Ordzhonikidze, Metallurg Lipetsk, Tekstilschik Ivanovo |
| 2 | Ukrainian SSR | 3 | Tavria Simferopol, Prykarpatye Ivano-Frankovsk, Metallurg Zaporozhye |
| 3 | Belarusian SSR | 1 | Dinamo Minsk |
| 3 | Azerbaijan SSR | 1 | Neftchi Baku |
| 3 | Georgian SSR | 1 | Torpedo Kutaisi |
| 3 | Tajik SSR | 1 | Pamir Dushanbe |
| 3 | Turkmen SSR | 1 | Stroitel Ashkhabat |

== See also ==
- Soviet First League
