= Vitaly Shevchenko =

Azerbaijani footballer and coach (born 1951)

Vitaly Shevchenko Виталий Шевченко
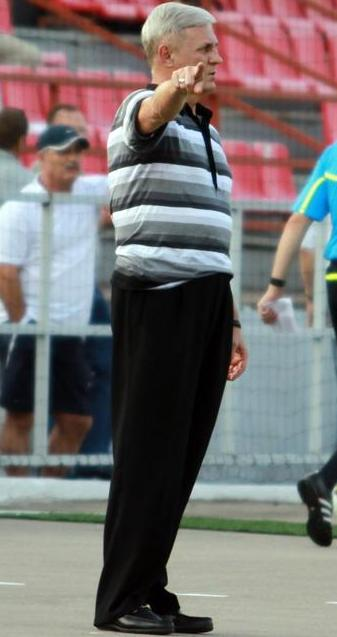

Personal information
- Full name: Vitaly Viktorovich Shevchenko
- Date of birth: 2 October 1951 (age 75)
- Place of birth: Baku, Azerbaijan SSR, Soviet Union
- Height: 1.78 m (5 ft 10 in)
- Position: Forward

Youth career
- 1963–1967: Neftchi Baku

Senior career*
| Years | Team | Apps | (Gls) |
| 1968–1971 | Neftchi Baku | 84 | (21) |
| 1972–1975 | Dynamo Kyiv | 7 | (1) |
| 1975–1982 | Chornomorets Odesa | 163 | (34) |
| 1982–1983 | Lokomotiv Moscow | 43 | (5) |
| Total | | 297 | (61) |

International career
| 1970–1972 | Soviet Union | 13 | (4) |

Managerial career
- 1986–1992: Lokomotiv Moscow (team manager)
- 1992–1994: Club Bolívar
- 1994–1995: Hapoel Be'er Sheva
- 1995–1996: Hapoel Ironi Rishon LeZion
- 1995–1996: Hapoel Be'er Sheva
- 1996: Uralmash Ekaterinburg
- 1997: Gazovik-Gazprom Izhevsk
- 1998: Uralan Elista
- 1999–2002: Torpedo Moscow
- 2002–2003: Saturn Ramenskoye
- 2004: FC Rostov
- 2004–2005: Metalurh Donetsk
- 2006: Terek Grozny
- 2007–2008: Chornomorets Odesa
- 2010: Rotor Volgograd
- * Club domestic league appearances and goals

Vitaly Viktorovich Shevchenko (Russian: Виталий Викторович Шевченко; born 2 October 1951) is an Azerbaijani coach and former Soviet footballer. His last work was head-coach of FC Rotor Volgograd. He finished the Institute of Physical Education (Kyiv) and the Supreme school of coaches in Moscow.

== Personal life ==
Vitaly has a brother, Vadym Shevchenko, who was also a footballer and a referee.
