= 1974 Soviet Top League =

37th season of top-tier football league in Soviet Union

Vysshaya Liga
- Season: 1974
- Dates: 12 April – 21 November 1974
- Champions: Dynamo Kyiv; 6th top-tier title
- Relegated: Kairat Alma-Ata; Nistru Kishinev
- European Cup: Dynamo Kyiv
- Cup Winners' Cup: Ararat Yerevan
- UEFA Cup: Spartak Moscow; Chernomorets Odessa
- Top goalscorer: Oleg Blokhin (20)

The 1974 Soviet Top League was the 36th season of the Soviet top-tier football competitions. It also was the 4th season since the establishing of Vysshaya Liga (Soviet Top League) in place of the Soviet Class A competition.

The league's title was contested by 16 teams, and Dynamo Kyiv won the championship which was their sixth title. The last season's champions Ararat placed fifth trailing 8 points. The newly promoted Chernomorets placed third qualifying for the continental competitions for the first time.

== Teams ==
=== Pre-season promotion ===
Teams promoted from the 1973 Soviet First League:

- Chornomorets Odesa – the champions (returning after three seasons absence)
- Nistru Kishinev – the runners-up (returning after 10 seasons absence)

=== Pre-season relegation ===
Teams relegated to the 1974 Soviet First League:

- Dinamo Minsk – the 15th place (ending their 14 seasons stay in the top-flight)
- SKA Rostov-na-Donu – the 16th place (ending their 15 seasons stay in the top-flight)

== Managers ==
Club	Head coach
Ararat Yerevan	Nikita Simonyan
Dynamo Kyiv	Valeriy Lobanovskyi
Dynamo Moscow	Gavriil Kachalin
Spartak Moscow	Nikolay Gulyayev
Dinamo Tbilisi	Givi Chokheli (until August); Mikhail Yakushin (from August)
Shakhter Donetsk	Yuriy Zakharov (until August); Vladimir Salkov (from August)
Zaria Voroshilovgrad	Vsevolod Blinkov (until July); Yevhen Pestov (from July)
Dnepr Dnepropetrovsk	Viktor Kanevsky
Kairat Alma-Ata	Artem Falyan
CSKA Moscow	Vladimir Agapov
Zenit Leningrad	German Zonin
Pakhtakor Tashkent	Vyacheslav Solovyov
Torpedo Moscow	Valentin Ivanov
Karpaty Lvov	Valentin Babukin (until September); Ernest Yust (from September)
Chornomorets Odesa	Akhmed Aleskerov
Nistru Kishenev	Viktor Korolkov

== League standings ==
Pos	Team	Pld	W	D	L	GF	GA	GD	Pts	Qualification or relegation
1	(Ukrainian Soviet Socialist Republic) Dynamo Kyiv (C)	30	14	12	4	49	24	+25	40	Qualification for European Cup first round
2	(Russian Soviet Federative Socialist Republic) Spartak Moscow	30	15	9	6	41	23	+18	39	Qualification for UEFA Cup first round
3	(Ukrainian Soviet Socialist Republic) Chornomorets Odesa	30	12	11	7	35	31	+4	35	Qualification for UEFA Cup first round
4	(Russian Soviet Federative Socialist Republic) Torpedo Moscow	30	13	7	10	35	28	+7	33	
5	(Armenian Soviet Socialist Republic) Ararat Yerevan	30	11	10	9	37	28	+9	32	Qualification for Cup Winners' Cup first round
6	(Russian Soviet Federative Socialist Republic) Dynamo Moscow	30	10	11	9	42	33	+9	31	
7	(Russian Soviet Federative Socialist Republic) Zenit Leningrad	30	8	15	7	36	41	−5	31	
8	(Uzbek Soviet Socialist Republic) Pakhtakor Tashkent	30	10	10	10	45	44	+1	30	
9	(Georgian Soviet Socialist Republic) Dinamo Tbilisi	30	8	14	8	29	34	−5	30	
10	(Ukrainian Soviet Socialist Republic) Dnipro Dnipropetrovsk	30	9	11	10	31	39	−8	29	
11	(Ukrainian Soviet Socialist Republic) Karpaty Lviv	30	8	12	10	33	33	0	28	
12	(Ukrainian Soviet Socialist Republic) Shakhtar Donetsk	30	8	12	10	31	35	−4	28	
13	(Russian Soviet Federative Socialist Republic) CSKA Moscow	30	7	12	11	28	33	−5	26	
14	(Ukrainian Soviet Socialist Republic) Zarya Voroshilovgrad	30	8	10	12	32	41	−9	26	
15	(Kazakh Soviet Socialist Republic) Kairat Alma-Ata (R)	30	8	10	12	37	47	−10	26	Relegation to First League
16	(Moldavian Soviet Socialist Republic) Nistru Kishinev (R)	30	4	8	18	32	59	−27	16	Relegation to First League

(C) Champions; (R) Relegated

== Results ==
Home \ Away	ARA	CHO	CSK	DNI	DYK	DYN	DTB	KAI	KAR	NIS	PAK	SHA	SPA	TOR	ZAR	ZEN
Ararat Yerevan		2–0	3–2	1–1	0–0	2–2	2–2	1–0	1–1	2–1	3–1	2–0	2–0	0–1	4–2	4–0
Chornomorets Odesa	2–1		1–0	2–2	3–3	0–0	2–2	3–3	2–0	5–1	1–0	1–0	1–0	1–0	2–1	2–0
CSKA Moscow	0–1	1–0		2–1	1–1	1–1	0–1	0–0	2–0	1–1	1–1	1–1	1–2	1–0	1–3	0–1
Dnipro Dnipropetrovsk	1–0	1–1	1–0		0–0	3–1	0–0	1–0	3–1	2–0	2–0	1–0	1–4	0–0	0–2	1–1
Dynamo Kyiv	2–0	2–0	2–0	3–1		2–0	2–0	2–0	1–1	4–2	1–1	1–0	1–0	2–0	5–0	5–0
Dynamo Moscow	2–3	1–1	1–2	3–1	1–2		0–0	1–2	2–1	1–0	4–0	3–0	1–1	0–1	5–0	3–1
Dinamo Tbilisi	1–0	2–0	1–3	0–0	0–0	0–0		1–1	0–0	4–2	1–1	1–0	0–1	0–0	3–2	1–1
Kairat Alma-Ata	0–0	0–0	0–0	1–0	2–1	2–1	5–0		0–2	2–0	4–3	0–0	0–4	1–1	2–1	2–2
Karpaty Lviv	1–1	1–1	1–1	4–3	0–0	4–1	0–0	2–2		3–0	2–0	1–1	1–1	1–0	0–0	3–2
Nistru Kishinev	2–2	1–2	3–3	1–2	1–0	0–1	1–3	4–2	1–0		0–1	2–2	1–0	0–3	0–0	1–1
Pakhtakor Tashkent	0–0	0–1	4–1	5–0	3–3	0–0	2–1	4–1	1–0	3–0		3–1	0–3	2–2	4–2	1–1
Shakhtar Donetsk	1–0	2–1	0–0	2–1	2–2	0–0	1–1	5–2	2–1	2–1	2–0		0–0	0–2	0–0	2–2
Spartak Moscow	1–0	3–0	2–1	0–0	2–0	0–0	1–0	1–0	2–1	2–1	4–1	1–3		0–0	2–2	1–1
Torpedo Moscow	1–0	0–0	0–2	3–0	1–1	0–2	4–1	3–1	0–1	4–3	0–1	2–1	3–1		2–1	2–1
Zarya Voroshilovgrad	1–0	0–0	0–0	1–1	1–1	1–2	2–1	1–0	2–0	1–1	1–1	2–0	0–1	3–0		0–1
Zenit Leningrad	0–0	2–0	0–0	1–1	2–0	3–3	1–2	3–2	1–0	1–1	2–2	1–1	1–1	1–0	2–0	

Legend: Blue = home team win; Yellow = draw; Red = away team win.

== Top scorers ==
20 goals

- Oleg Blokhin (Dynamo Kyiv)

16 goals

- Anatoli Ionkin (Kairat)
- Vadim Pavlenko (Dynamo Moscow)

13 goals

- Vladimir Makarov (Chornomorets Odesa)

12 goals

- Vadim Nikonov (Torpedo Moscow)

11 goals

- Mikhail An (Pakhtakor)
- Anatoly Baidachny (Dynamo Moscow)
- Vladimir Onischenko (Dynamo Kyiv)
- Vitali Starukhin (Shakhtar)

10 goals

- Vladimir Danilyuk (Karpaty)
- Aleksandr Piskaryov (Spartak Moscow)

== Attendances ==
No.	Club	Average
1	Dynamo Kyiv	42,267
2	Ararat	37,513
3	Zenit	36,533
4	Chornomorets	29,600
5	Paxtakor	28,933
6	Shakhtar Donetsk	25,733
7	Dynamo Moscow	24,333
8	Spartak Moscow	24,033
9	Karpaty	21,533
10	Kairat	21,433
11	Dinamo Tbilisi	20,600
12	Nistru	20,000
13	Torpedo Moscow	18,467
14	PFC CSKA	18,467
15	Dnipro	16,467
16	Zorya	15,533
