= Volodymyr Onyshchenko =

Ukrainian footballer (born 1949)

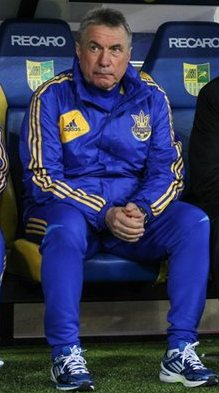

Personal information
- Full name: Volodymyr Ivanovych Onyshchenko
- Date of birth: 28 October 1949 (age 77)
- Place of birth: Stechanka, Chernobyl Raion, Ukrainian SSR, Soviet Union
- Height: 1.72 m (5 ft 8 in)
- Position: Striker

Team information
- Current team: Ukraine (observer)

Youth career
- 1960–1961: Bilshovyk Kyiv
- 1962–1969: Dynamo Kyiv

Senior career*
Years	Team	Apps	(Gls)
1970–1971	Dynamo Kyiv	10	(4)
1971–1973	Zorya Luhansk	52	(18)
1974–1978	Dynamo Kyiv	113	(33)
Total		175	(55)

International career
1972–1977	USSR	44	(11)

Managerial career
- 1990–1991: Dynamo Bila Tserkva
- 1992–1994: Dynamo-2 Kyiv
- 1995: Dynamo Kyiv
- 1995–1997: Dynamo-2 Kyiv
- 1997–1998: Metalurh Donetsk
- 1999–2002: Ukraine U21
- 2002–2006: Dynamo-2 Kyiv
- 2008–2012: Dynamo Kyiv (scout)
- 2013–2016: Ukraine (assistant)
- 2016–: Ukraine (observer)
- * Club domestic league appearances and goals

Volodymyr Onyshchenko
Medal record

Representing Soviet Union

Men's Football
Bronze medal – third place	1972 Munich	Team competition
Bronze medal – third place	1976 Montreal	Team competition

UEFA European Championship
Silver medal – second place	1972 Belgium	

Volodymyr Ivanovych Onyshchenko (Ukrainian: Володимир Іванович Онищенко; born 28 October 1949) is a Ukrainian football coach and former player. He scored two goals as Dynamo Kyiv won the 1975 European Cup Winners' Cup Final.

== International career ==
Onyshchenko earned 44 caps for the USSR national team and out of those 8 games he played for the Olympic team. He also participated in 1972 and won two Olympic bronze medals.

== Career statistics ==
=== Club ===
Appearances and goals by club, season and competition
Club	Season	League		Cup		Europe		Total	
Club	Season	Apps	GS	Apps	GS	Apps	GS	Apps	GS
Dynamo Kyiv	1970	7	4	3	1	—		10	5
Dynamo Kyiv	1971	3	0	3	1	—		6	1
Zorya Voroshilovgrad	1971	5	1	—		—		5	1
Zorya Voroshilovgrad	1972	27	10	2	0	—		29	10
Zorya Voroshilovgrad	1973	20	7	4	1	2	0	26	8
Dynamo Kyiv	1974	27	11	3	1	4	3	34	15
Dynamo Kyiv	1975	23	8	—		9	7	32	15
Dynamo Kyiv	1976 sp	4	0	—		2	0	6	0
Dynamo Kyiv	1976 au	14	2	1	0	1	1	16	3
Dynamo Kyiv	1977	21	5	1	0	5	1	27	6
Dynamo Kyiv	1978	24	7	6	3	4	0	34	10
10 seasons in Vysshaya Liga		155	55	23	7	27	12	205	74

Notes:

- The table includes league and cup competitions of the All-Union level. It does not include competitions at the republican level.
- The 10-season totals include all games at the top tier, Soviet Cup, and European competitions.

=== International ===
Appearances and goals by national team and year
National team	Year	Apps	Goals
Soviet Union	1972	10	1
Soviet Union	1973	9	3
Soviet Union	1974	3	0
Soviet Union	1975	7	2
Soviet Union	1976	11	4
Soviet Union	1977	4	1
Total		44	11

Scores and results list the Soviet Union's goal tally first, score column indicates score after each Onyshchenko goal.

List of international goals scored by Volodymyr Onyshchenko
No.	Date	Venue	Opponent	Score	Result	Competition
1	29 June 1972	Estádio do Morumbi, São Paulo, Brazil	Uruguay	1–0	1–0	Brazil Independence Cup
2	18 April 1973	Tsentralnyi Stadion, Kyiv, Soviet Union	Romania	1–0	2–0	Friendly
3	13 May 1973	Tsentralnyi Stadion imeni Lenina, Moscow, Soviet Union	Republic of Ireland	1–0	1–0	1974 FIFA World Cup qualification
4	26 May 1973	Tsentralnyi Stadion imeni Lenina, Moscow, Soviet Union	France	2–0	2–0	1974 FIFA World Cup qualification
5	12 November 1975	Tsentralnyi Stadion, Kyiv, Soviet Union	Switzerland	2–0	4–1	UEFA Euro 1976 qualifying
6	12 November 1975	Tsentralnyi Stadion, Kyiv, Soviet Union	Switzerland	3–1	4–1	UEFA Euro 1976 qualifying
7	24 March 1976	Levski Stadium, Sofia, Bulgaria	Bulgaria	1–0	3–0	Friendly
8	19 July 1976	Olympic Stadium, Montreal, Canada	Canada	1–0	2–1	1976 Summer Olympics
9	19 July 1976	Olympic Stadium, Montreal, Canada	Canada	2–0	2–1	1976 Summer Olympics
10	29 July 1976	Olympic Stadium, Montreal, Canada	Brazil	1–0	2–0	1976 Summer Olympics
11	20 March 1977	El Menzah Stadium, Tunis, Tunisia	Tunisia	3–0	3–0	Friendly

== Honours ==
- Soviet Top League (5): 1971, 1972, 1974, 1975, 1977
- Soviet Cup (2): 1974, 1978
- UEFA Cup Winners' Cup (1): 1975
- UEFA Super Cup (1): 1975
- UEFA Euro: runner-up 1972
- Olympic bronze: 1972, 1976
