= Gennady Yevryuzhikhin =

Russian footballer

Personal information
- Full name: Gennady Yegorovich Yevryuzhikhin
- Date of birth: 4 February 1944
- Place of birth: Kazan, USSR
- Date of death: 15 March 1998 (aged 54)
- Place of death: Moscow, Russia
- Height: 1.70 m (5 ft 7 in)
- Position: Striker

Youth career
- 1962–1963: Raketa Kazan

Senior career*
Years	Team	Apps	(Gls)
1964	Lokomotiv Leningrad		
1965–1966	Dynamo Leningrad		
1966–1976	Dynamo Moscow	283	(54)

International career
1966–1973	USSR	37	(6)
Medal record
Olympic medal record
Representing Soviet Union
Men's Football
Bronze medal – third place	1972 Munich	Team competition
- * Club domestic league appearances and goals

Gennady Yegorovich Yevryuzhikhin (Russian: Геннадий Егорович Еврюжихин; born 4 February 1944 in Kazan; died 15 March 1998 in Moscow) was a Russian footballer.

== Honours ==
- Soviet Top League winner: 1976 (spring).
- Soviet Top League runner-up: 1967, 1970.
- Soviet Cup winner: 1967, 1970.
- UEFA Cup Winners' Cup finalist: 1972.
- Olympic bronze: 1972.

== International career ==
He earned 37 caps for the USSR national football team, and participated in UEFA Euro 1968 and the 1970 FIFA World Cup. He also earned a bronze medal in football at the 1972 Summer Olympics, scoring one goal against Sudan.
