= 1975 Soviet First League =

Soviet First League
- Season: 1975

The 1975 Soviet First League was the fifth season of the Soviet First League and the 35th season of the Soviet second tier league competition.

== Final standings ==
Pos	Rep	Team	Pld	W	D	L	GF	GA	GD	Pts	Promotion or relegation
1	RUS	(Russian Soviet Federative Socialist Republic) Krylia Sovetov Kuibyshev	38	22	9	7	78	36	+42	53	Promoted
2	BLR	(Byelorussian Soviet Socialist Republic) Dinamo Minsk	38	21	8	9	52	31	+21	50	Promoted
3	GEO	(Georgian Soviet Socialist Republic) Torpedo Kutaisi	38	18	13	7	55	31	+24	49	
4	KAZ	(Kazakh Soviet Socialist Republic) Kairat Alma-Ata	38	20	7	11	58	34	+24	47	
5	AZE	(Azerbaijan Soviet Socialist Republic) Neftçi Baku	38	17	12	9	58	35	+23	46	
6	MDA	(Moldavian Soviet Socialist Republic) Nistru Chișinău	38	17	9	12	44	43	+1	43	
7	UKR	(Ukrainian Soviet Socialist Republic) Tavriya Simferopol	38	17	8	13	58	46	+12	42	
8	RUS	(Russian Soviet Federative Socialist Republic) Shinnik Yaroslavl	38	12	15	11	48	42	+6	39	
9	RUS	(Russian Soviet Federative Socialist Republic) Spartak Orzhonikidze	38	15	7	16	41	43	−2	37	
10	TJK	(Tajik Soviet Socialist Republic) Pamir Dushanbe	38	12	13	13	45	51	−6	37	
11	RUS	(Russian Soviet Federative Socialist Republic) Rubin Kazan	38	12	13	13	37	51	−14	37	
12	UKR	(Ukrainian Soviet Socialist Republic) Spartak Ivano-Frankivsk	38	14	7	17	50	48	+2	35	
13	UKR	(Ukrainian Soviet Socialist Republic) Metalurh Zaporizhzhia	38	11	13	14	47	45	+2	35	
14	RUS	(Russian Soviet Federative Socialist Republic) Spartak Nalchik	38	11	13	14	33	42	−9	35	
15	RUS	(Russian Soviet Federative Socialist Republic) Kuzbass Kemerovo	38	13	8	17	36	47	−11	34	
16	RUS	(Russian Soviet Federative Socialist Republic) Kuban Krasnodar	38	12	9	17	38	47	−9	33	
17	RUS	(Russian Soviet Federative Socialist Republic) Uralmash Sverdlovsk	38	13	6	19	44	56	−12	32	Relegation Play-Off
18	RUS	(Russian Soviet Federative Socialist Republic) Zvezda Perm	38	12	8	18	35	50	−15	32	Relegation Play-Off
19	UKR	(Ukrainian Soviet Socialist Republic) Metallist Kharkiv	38	10	11	17	30	49	−19	31	Relegated
20	KGZ	(Kirghiz Soviet Socialist Republic) Alga Frunze	38	4	5	29	28	88	−60	13	Relegated

Source: rsssf.com

=== Relegation play-off ===
[Tashkent]

- Zvezda Perm 2-1 UralMash Sverdlovsk

== Number of teams by union republic ==
Rank	Union republic	Number of teams	Club(s)
1	RSFSR	9	Krylia Sovetov Kuibyshev, Shinnik Yaroslavl, Spartak Ordzhonikidze, Rubin Kazan, Elbrus Nalchik, Kuzbass Kemerevo, Kuban Krasnodar, Zvezda Perm, Uralmash Sverdlovsk
2	Ukrainian SSR	4	Tavria Simferopol, Prykarpatye Ivano-Frankovsk, Metallurg Zaporozhye, Metallist Kharkov
3	Belarusian SSR	1	Dinamo Minsk
3	Georgian SSR	1	Torpedo Kutaisi
3	Kazakh SSR	1	Kairat Alma-Ata
3	Azerbaijan SSR	1	Neftchi Baku
3	Moldavian SSR	1	Nistru Kishinev
3	Tajik SSR	1	Pamir Dushanbe
3	Kyrgyz SSR	1	Alga Frunze

== See also ==
- Soviet First League
