= Volodymyr Muntyan =

Ukrainian footballer (1946–2025)

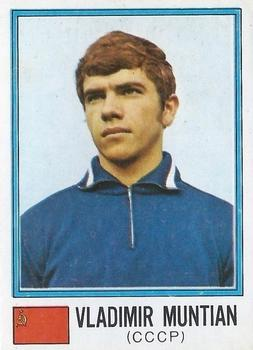
- Muntyan in 1974

Personal information
- Full name: Volodymyr Fedorovych Muntyan
- Date of birth: 14 September 1946
- Place of birth: Kotovsk, Ukrainian SSR, USSR
- Date of death: 1 December 2025 (aged 79)
- Place of death: Kyiv, Ukraine
- Height: 1.69 m (5 ft 7 in)
- Position: Midfielder

Youth career
- Dynamo Kyiv

Senior career*
Years	Team	Apps	(Gls)
1965–1977	Dynamo Kyiv	302	(57)
1980	SKA Kyiv	7	(1)

International career
1968–1976	USSR	49	(7)

Managerial career
- 1980–1982: SKA Kyiv
- 1986–1988: COSFAP Antananarivo
- 1992–1994: Ukraine U21
- 1995–1997: Guinea
- 1998: Cherkasy
- 1999: Orion Kyiv
- 2000: Tavriya Simferopol
- 2001: Obolon Kyiv
- 2002: Alania Vladikavkaz
- 2003–2004: Kryvbas Kryvyi Rih
- 2004–2005: Vorskla Poltava
- 2008: Ukraine U21 (interim)
Medal record
Men's football
Representing USSR
UEFA European Championship
Silver medal – second place	1972 Belgium
- * Club domestic league appearances and goals

Volodymyr Fedorovych Muntyan (Ukrainian: Володимир Федорович Мунтян, Russian: Владимир Фёдорович Мунтян, Romanian: Vladimir Muntean; 14 September 1946 – 1 December 2025) was a Soviet and Ukrainian football midfielder of the 1960s and 1970s. Muntyan is considered to be one of the best and most talented players to represent Dynamo Kyiv and the Soviet Union. He was also the only player apart from Oleg Blokhin (his teammate in the 1970s) who has won seven Soviet championships. His brother Viktor Muntyan is also a former professional football player.

== Early life ==
A son of an ethnic Russian plant worker from Moldova and a Russian nurse born in Voronezh, Muntyan became interested in acrobatics and competed successfully in Kyiv's citywide competition, winning accolades in his age category. His family eventually relocated to live near a professional soccer grounds in Kyiv, where young Muntyan and his friends would hang out, acting as ball boys to the elders. While once juggling a ball, he was approached by a soldier, who asked him if he was interested in taking up football as a sport. Muntyan said yes and was taken to Mikhail Korsunsky, who was a famous local children's coach at the time. He quickly recognised Muntyan's potential.

== Career ==
=== Youth years ===
Due to the boy's natural talent, he was included in Kyiv's youth team with people like Semen Altman and Anatoly Byshovets (both coaches now). After a Spartakiada match between the Kyiv and Moscow teams, which Kyiv won, Dynamo Kyiv youth coach Mykhaylo Koman offered young Muntyan to come to a training session with the senior team the next day at 11:00. The young boy turned up outside the ground, but was so scared to see his idols Valery Lobanovsky, Andriy Biba, that he hid behind a tree and did not make the team bus. However, his friend Anatoly Byshovets helped him to get over the fear and eventually he turned up to a training session.

=== Club career ===
Muntyan joined the Dynamo Kyiv team as a 15-year-old, when the main team coach was Victor Maslov. Despite weighing only 60 kg (9.5 stones) and being only 170 cm in height, he was encouraged to play and his skills were further enhanced by the training. Muntyan's debut match in Dynamo Kyiv's main squad took place on 15 October 1965, when his team played against Pakhtakor, winning 2:1. When five of then current squad left to join 1966 Soviet football team for the World Cup, Dynamo Kyiv managed to win a double (championship and the cup) with Muntyan stepping in from the reserves as one of the main players.

In total, Muntyan won 7 championships and two Soviet Cups with Dynamo Kyiv. In 1975, he also achieved the title of UEFA Cup Winners' Cup and UEFA Super Cup champion as part of the victorious team.

=== Soviet national team ===
During his career, Muntyan played 49 games for the Soviet Union national football team, scoring 7 goals. In 1970, he represented the Soviet Union as part of the 1970 FIFA World Cup, and in 1976 his team won bronze in the 1976 Summer Olympics.

=== Managerial career ===
After his retirement as a player of Dynamo Kyiv in 1977, Muntyan started working as a youth team coach. In 1992-1994, he managed the Ukraine Olympic football team.

== Personal life and death ==
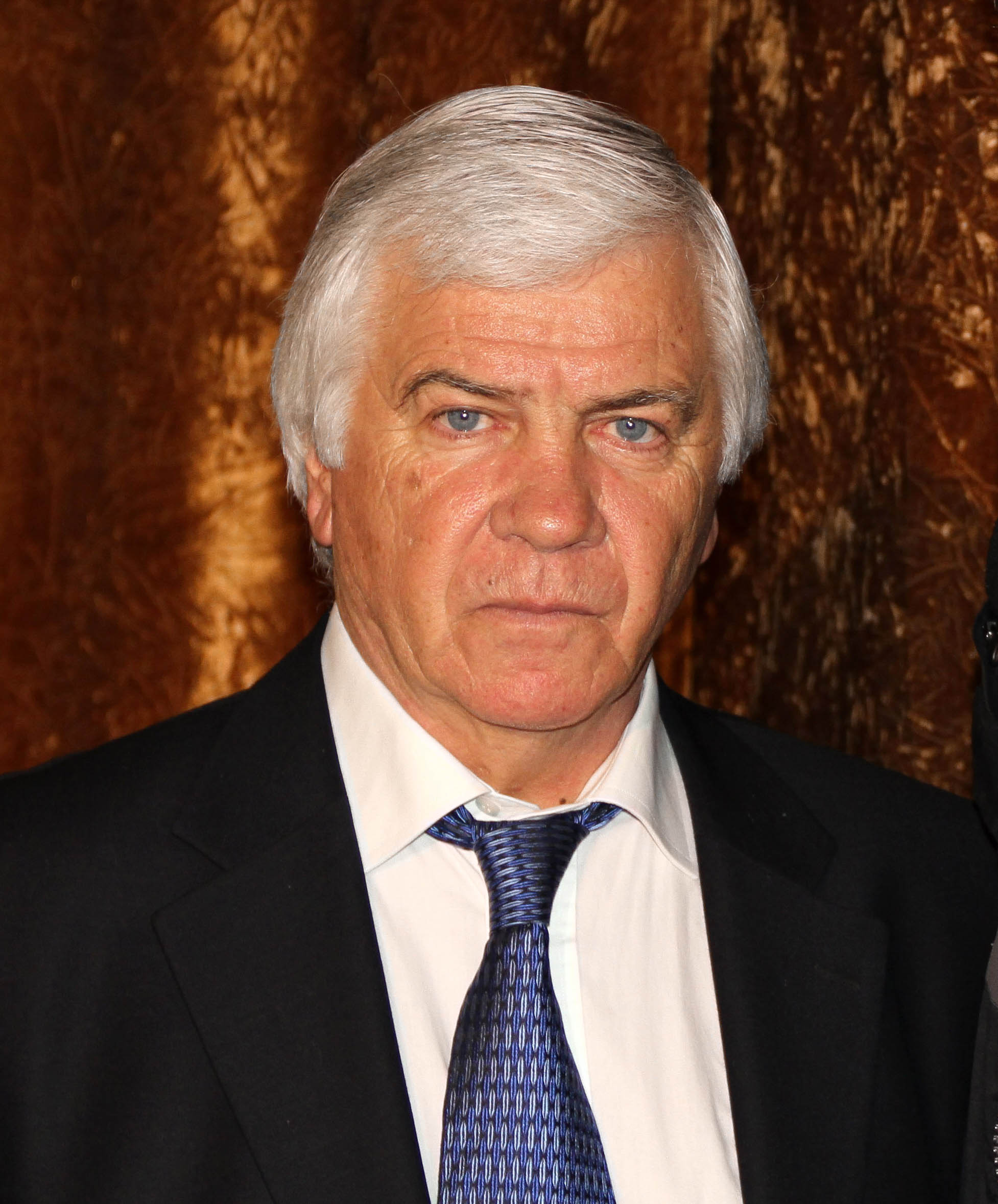
Muntyan during his later years

Muntyan was the son of a Red Army veteran who fought in the Winter War (Soviet-Finnish War), the Eastern Front of World War II, and the Soviet–Japanese War. His father, Fedir Muntyanu, had 11 brothers. When Fedir Muntyanu received his passport, he declared himself Russian. Only when Muntyan was 14 or 15 did he become aware that his father was actually from Moldova. Muntyan's mother was Russian from the Voronezh Oblast. In the Soviet times, there existed a popular anecdote about Muntyan's ancestry speculating that he may be of Armenian origin.

Muntyan's father worked as a fitter at a local asphalt concrete plant.

By the time Muntyan started to go to school, his family had already moved to Kyiv. During his time at school, he was interested in several types of sports such as volleyball, basketball, skiing, and ice skating. Moreover, Muntyan became even more involved in acrobatics, becoming the Kyiv city champion among student athletes at the age of 10 and receiving the adult-grade 3rd degree GTO standards in acrobatics. At that time, he never thought that he would drop out of acrobatics and become a football player. Soon, his family received a bigger apartment granted by the factory where his father worked. It so happened that the place was close to the SKA stadium (today CSK ZSU Stadium) and far away from where he practiced acrobatics. The young Muntyan started to spend more time at the stadium, where there was more football practice.

Muntyan died after a long illness on 1 December 2025, at the age of 79.

== Career statistics ==
Appearances and goals by club, season and competition
Club	Season	League		Cup		Europe		Total	
Club	Season	Apps	Goals	Apps	Goals	Apps	Goals	Apps	Goals
Dynamo Kyiv	1965	3	0	4	0	0	0	7	0
Dynamo Kyiv	1966	26	8	2	0	0	0	28	8
Dynamo Kyiv	1967	19	4	1	0	0	0	20	4
Dynamo Kyiv	1968	36	5	0	0	0	0	36	5
Dynamo Kyiv	1969	27	6	3	2	4	2	34	10
Dynamo Kyiv	1970	25	3	2	0	0	0	27	3
Dynamo Kyiv	1971	18	6	2	0	0	0	20	6
Dynamo Kyiv	1972	30	9	3	1	6	1	39	11
Dynamo Kyiv	1973	28	6	9	2	5	0	42	8
Dynamo Kyiv	1974	22	2	4	2	8	2	34	6
Dynamo Kyiv	1975	29	2	0	0	4	0	33	2
Dynamo Kyiv	1976 (s)	10	3	1	0	0	0	11	3
Dynamo Kyiv	1976 (a)	13	1	0	0	8	1	21	2
Dynamo Kyiv	1977	16	2	3	0	0	0	19	2
Total		302	57	34	7	35	6	371	70

- The statistics in USSR Cups and Europe is made under the scheme "autumn-spring" and enlisted in a year of start of tournaments

== Honours ==
Dynamo Kyiv

- UEFA Cup Winners Cup: 1975
- UEFA Super Cup: 1975
- USSR Championship (7): 1966, 1967, 1968, 1971, 1974, 1975, 1977; runner-up 1965, 1969, 1972, 1973, 1976
- USSR Cup: 1966, 1974; runner-up 1973
- USSR Super Cup runner-up: 1977

Soviet Union

- UEFA Euro: runner-up 1972; fourth place 1968

Individual

- Ballon d'Or 23rd: 1969
- Ukrainian Footballer of the Year: 1968*,1970
- Soviet Footballer of the Year: 1969
- ADN Eastern European Footballer of the Season: 1969
