= Andrei Stocker =

Romanian footballer (1942–2025)

Personal information
- Date of birth: 22 November 1942
- Place of birth: Aninoasa, Romania
- Date of death: 21 December 2025 (aged 83)
- Height: 1.95 m (6 ft 5 in)
- Position: Central defender

Youth career
- Minerul Aninoasa

Senior career*
Years	Team	Apps	(Gls)
- Minerul Aninoasa
1965–1976	Jiul Petroșani (Note: The statistics for the 1965–66 Divizia B season are unavailable.)	271	(8)
1976–1977	Minerul Lupeni		
- * Club domestic league appearances and goals

Andrei Stocker (22 November 1942 – 21 December 2025) was a Romanian footballer who played as a central defender and a referee.

== Playing career ==
Stocker, nicknamed "Keke", was born on 22 November 1942 in Aninoasa, Romania. His parents were Transylvanian Saxon miners, and because of their German origins, they were deported by the Soviets in 1945 to perform forced labor for a few years in the Donbas region.

Stocker started playing football at Minerul Aninoasa. There, he was noticed by coach Eugen Mladin who brought him to his team, Jiul Petroșani. In his first season at Jiul, he helped the team gain promotion to Divizia A. He made his debut in the competition on 21 August 1966 under coach Ștefan Coidum in a 7–0 victory against Steagul Roșu Brașov. After playing one and a half years as a right midfielder, Stocker started to play alongside Gogu Tonca in the central defense. Subsequently, they became known for their tough playing style, with some considering them the most aggressive defensive duo in Divizia A's history. His first performance with The Miners was reaching the 1972 Cupa României final, where coach Eugen Iordache used him the entire match in the eventual 2–0 loss to Rapid București. Stocker eventually won the competition two years later after a 4–2 victory against Politehnica Timișoara in the 1974 final, as coach Traian Ivănescu used him the full 90 minutes, helping Jiul win its first trophy. Afterwards he played in both legs against Dundee United in the first round of the 1974–75 European Cup Winners' Cup which was lost with 3–2 on aggregate. In May 1975, during a Jiul – Politehnica Iași home game, the wooden stand of the stadium started to burn due to a cigarette thrown into a pile of seed husks. Stocker, along with teammates Tonca and Petre Libardi jumped in to help the firefighters extinguish the fire. He appeared in 271 Divizia A matches and scored eight goals for Jiul.

In 1976, Stocker joined Minerul Lupeni, ending his career one year later.

== Refereeing career ==
After he retired from his playing career, Stocker became a referee, officiating in Divizia C and serving as a linesman in Divizia B and Divizia A.

== Personal life and death ==
In 1986, Stocker emigrated to Sweden where he settled in the city of Malmö with his family.

Stocker died on 21 December 2025 at the age of 83.

== Honours ==
Jiul Petroșani

- Divizia B: 1965–66
- Cupa României: 1973–74, runner-up 1971–72
