= Petre Libardi =

Romanian footballer (1942–2005)

Personal information
- Date of birth: 27 August 1942
- Place of birth: Câmpulung-Muscel, Romania
- Date of death: 14 August 2005 (aged 62)
- Height: 1.76 m (5 ft 9 in)
- Position: Attacking midfielder

Youth career
- 1956–1957: Minerul Câmpulung

Senior career*
Years	Team	Apps	(Gls)
1957–1961	Minerul Câmpulung		
1961–1962	Dinamo Pitești	0	(0)
1962–1963	Minerul Câmpulung		
1963–1975	Jiul Petroșani (Note: The statistics for the 1963–64 and 1964–65 Divizia B seasons are unavailable.)	263	(47)

International career
1967	Romania	2	(0)

Managerial career
- 1975–1976: Victoria Călan
- 1976–1977: Minerul Lupeni
- 1980–1982: Jiul Petroșani
- 1982–1985: Minerul Lupeni
- Paroșeni Vulcan
- 1990–1991: Jiul Petroșani
- * Club domestic league appearances and goals

Petre Libardi (27 August 1942 – 14 August 2005) was a Romanian footballer who played as an attacking midfielder. He is the namesake of the Petre Libardi Stadium.

== Club career ==
Libardi was born on 27 August 1942 in Câmpulung-Muscel and began playing football at Minerul Câmpulung. He went for a short period to Dinamo Pitești, but then returned to Minerul.

In 1963, Libardi joined Jiul Petroșani in Divizia B. He helped them gain promotion to Divizia A three years later. He made his debut in the competition on 21 August 1966 under coach Ștefan Coidum in a 7–0 victory against Steagul Roșu Brașov. His first performance with The Miners was reaching the 1972 Cupa României final, where coach Eugen Iordache used him the entire match in the eventual 2–0 loss to Rapid București. Libardi eventually won the competition two years later after a 4–2 victory against Politehnica Timișoara in the 1974 final, as coach Traian Ivănescu used him the full 90 minutes, helping Jiul win its first trophy. Afterwards, he played in both legs against Dundee United in the first round of the 1974–75 European Cup Winners' Cup which was lost with 3–2 on aggregate.

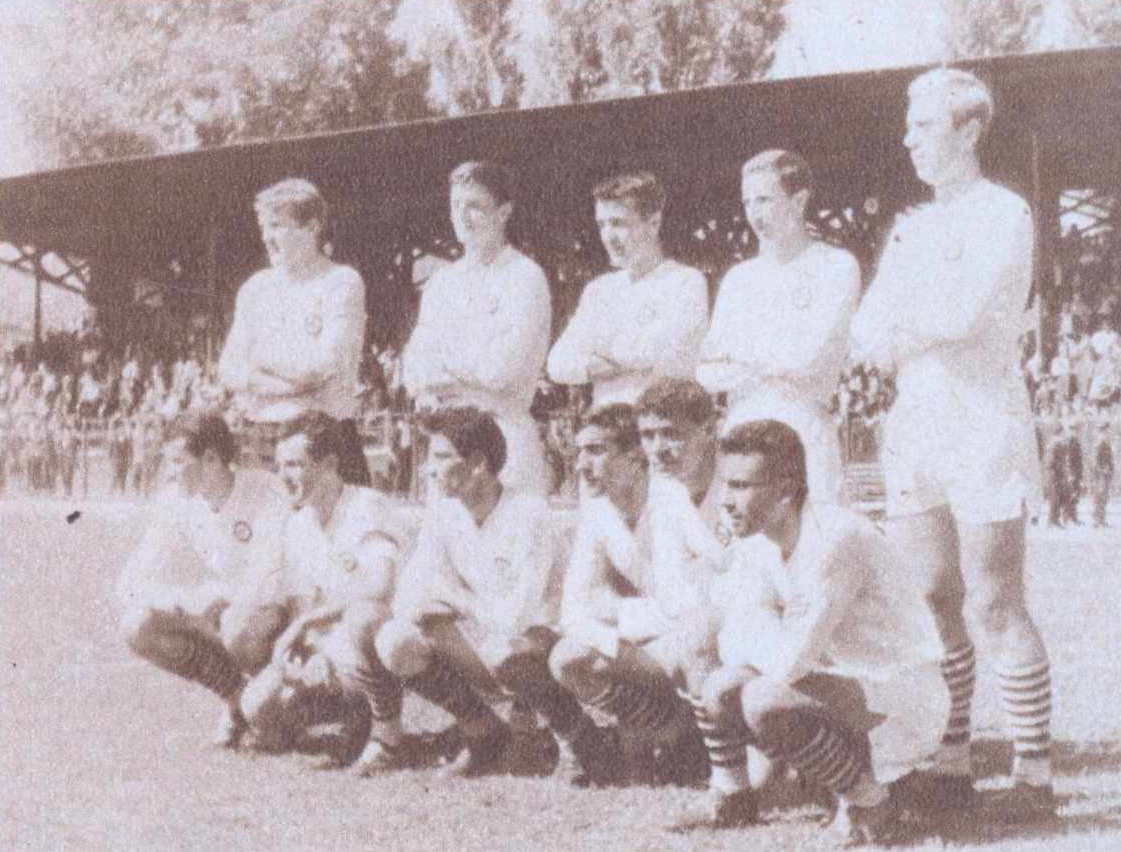
Jiul in 1965. Top row: Ion Vasile — goalkeeper, Teodor Pop, Nicoară, Șerban, Mircea Crăciun. Bottom row: Andrei Stoker, Cazan — team captain, Florea Martinovici, Petre Libardi, Traian Ivănescu, Peronescu.

In May 1975, during a home game against Politehnica Iași, the wooden stand of the stadium started to burn due to a cigarette thrown into a pile of seed husks. Libardi, along with teammates Gogu Tonca and Andrei Stocker jumped in to help the firefighters extinguish the fire. Libardi was Jiul's captain ten years from 1965 until 1975, a period in which he appeared in 238 Divizia A games and scored 47 goals. His last appearance in the competition occurred on 29 June 1975 in a 2–1 away loss to Universitatea Cluj.

== International career ==
Libardi played two games for Romania, making his debut under coach Bazil Marian in a 1–1 friendly draw against Uruguay, which took place in Montevideo at Estadio Gran Parque Central. His second game was also a friendly which ended in a 0–0 draw against Poland.

== Managerial career ==
After he retired, Libardi worked as a manager, first in the Romanian lower leagues for clubs such as Victoria Călan, Minerul Lupeni and Paroșeni Vulcan. He later became the manager of the Divizia A team at Jiul Petroșani twice, once in the early 1980s and again in 1990. He also served as Jiul's president.

== Personal life and death ==
In 2001, Libardi became an honorary citizen of Petroșani.

Libardi died on 14 August 2005 at the age of 62.

In 2019, 100 years after Jiul Petroșani was founded, the name of the team’s home stadium was changed from Jiul to Petre Libardi Stadium.

== Honours ==
Jiul Petroșani

- Divizia B: 1965–66
- Cupa României: 1973–74, runner-up 1971–72
