= Gogu Tonca =

Romanian footballer

Personal information
- Date of birth: 2 May 1947
- Place of birth: Bucharest, Romania
- Date of death: 23 October 2010 (aged 63)
- Place of death: Petroșani, Romania
- Position: Central defender

Youth career
- 1959–1966: Steaua București

Senior career*
Years	Team	Apps	(Gls)
1966–1976	Jiul Petroșani	176	(4)
1976–1977	Corvinul Hunedoara	31	(2)
1977–1978	Minerul Lupeni		
Total		207	(6)

Managerial career
- 1980–1982: Jiul Petroșani (assistant)
- 1983–1984: Jiul Petroșani
- 1989–1990: Jiul Petroșani
- 1994: Jiul Petroșani (caretaker)
- 1994–1995: Minerul Livezeni
- Minerul Lupeni
- * Club domestic league appearances and goals

Gogu Tonca (2 May 1947 – 23 October 2010) was a Romanian footballer who played as a central defender and a manager.

== Playing career ==
Tonca was born on 2 May 1947 in Bucharest, Romania and initially practiced boxing before switching to football with Steaua București's junior squads.

In 1966 he joined Jiul Petroșani, making his Divizia A debut on 12 November 1966 under coach Ștefan Coidum in a 1–0 loss to Dinamo București. After playing in his first seasons at Jiul as a right or left defender, Tonca started to play alongside Andrei Stocker in the central defense. Subsequently, they became known for their tough playing style, with some considering them the most aggressive defensive duo in Divizia A's history. Tonca, in particular, was known for his distinctive method of engaging opponents before home games. He would approach them, cautioning against overly ambitious play to avoid severe tackles, explaining his imperative to win for his four children and the victory money essential for their provision. His first performance with The Miners was reaching the 1972 Cupa României final, where coach Eugen Iordache used him the entire match in the eventual 2–0 loss to Rapid București. Tonca eventually won the competition two years later after a 4–2 victory against Politehnica Timișoara in the 1974 final, as coach Traian Ivănescu used him the full 90 minutes, helping Jiul win its first trophy. Afterwards he played in both legs and scored one goal against Dundee United in the first round of the 1974–75 European Cup Winners' Cup which was lost with 3–2 on aggregate. In May 1975, during a Jiul – Politehnica Iași home game, the wooden stand of the stadium started to burn due to a cigarette thrown into the pile of seed husks. Tonca along with teammates Stocker and Petre Libardi jumped in to help the firefighters extinguish the fire.

In 1976, Tonca joined Corvinul Hunedoara, where on 30 June 1977 he made his Divizia A appearance in a 1–0 win over Politehnica Iași, totaling 207 matches with six goals in the competition. Afterwards he moved to Minerul Lupeni in Divizia B where he ended his playing career.

== Managerial career ==
After he retired from his playing career, Tonca started working as an assistant for his former teammate, Petre Libardi at Jiul Petroșani. Shortly afterwards he became head coach of the team and he also coached Minerul Lupeni.

== Personal life and death ==
His nephew, Andrei Tonca, was also a footballer who played as a goalkeeper for Jiul Petroșani, among other teams.

Tonca died on 23 October 2010 at age 63.

== Honours ==
Jiul Petroșani

- Cupa României: 1973–74, runner-up 1971–72
