= Gheorghe Mulțescu =

Romanian footballer and manager (1951–2024)

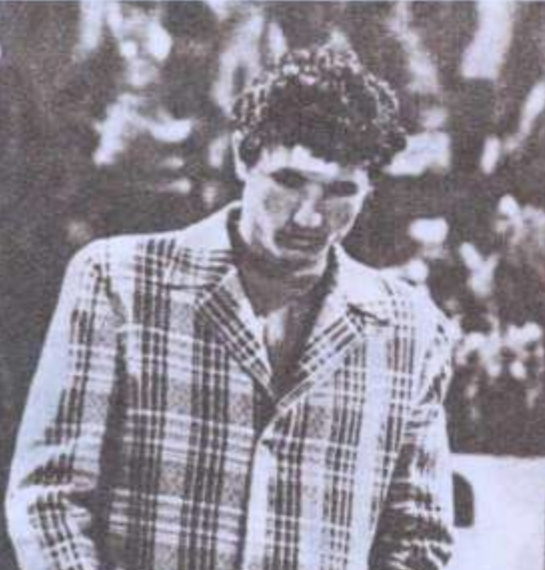
- Mulțescu in 1972

Personal information
- Date of birth: 13 November 1951
- Place of birth: Botoroaga, Romania
- Date of death: 15 September 2024 (aged 72)
- Place of death: Bucharest, Romania
- Height: 1.83 m (6 ft 0 in)
- Position: Midfielder

Youth career
- 1963–1971: Steaua București

Senior career*
Years	Team	Apps	(Gls)
1971–1979	Jiul Petroșani	239	(74)
1979–1985	Dinamo București	132	(29)
1985–1987	Jiul Petroșani	57	(17)
1987	CSM Suceava	9	(2)
1988	Autobuzul București	20	(2)
1988–1989	UTA Arad	18	(10)
1989	Rapid București		
1991–1992	Poiana Câmpina		
Total		475	(134)

International career
1974–1983	Romania (Note: Including four appearances and one goal for Romania's Olympic team.)	16	(3)

Managerial career
- 1984–1985: Dinamo București (player/assistant coach)
- 1985–1986: Jiul Petroșani (player-coach)
- 1986–1987: Jiul Petroșani (player-coach)
- 1988: Autobuzul București (player-coach)
- 1988–1989: UTA Arad (player-coach)
- 1989: Rapid București (player-coach)
- 1990: UTA Arad
- 1990–1991: Dinamo București
- 1991–1992: Poiana Câmpina (player-coach)
- 1992–1993: Dacia Unirea Brăila
- 1993: Romania B
- 1993–1997: Samsunspor
- 1997–1998: Kayserispor
- 1998–1999: Adanaspor
- 1999–2000: Ankaragücü
- 2001: Sportul Studențesc
- 2001–2002: Astra Ploiești
- 2002–2003: Gaziantepspor
- 2003: Politehnica Timișoara
- 2003: Samsunspor
- 2003–2004: Petrolul Ploiești
- 2004: Apulum Alba Iulia
- 2004: Politehnica Timișoara
- 2005: Jiul Petroșani
- 2005: FC Brașov
- 2006–2007: Sportul Studențesc
- 2006: Vaslui
- 2007: Kahramanmaraşspor
- 2007: Universitatea Cluj
- 2008: Dinamo București
- 2009: Progresul București
- 2009–2010: Ceahlăul Piatra Neamț
- 2010: Al Taawon
- 2011: Sportul Studențesc
- 2012: Delta Tulcea
- 2012: Petrolul Ploiești
- 2012: Astra Giurgiu
- 2013: Gaz Metan Mediaș
- 2013: Dinamo București
- 2014: Petrolul Ploiești
- 2015: Al Ettifaq
- 2015–2016: Voluntari
- 2016–2017: Universitatea Craiova
- 2018: Astra Giurgiu
- 2018: Astra Giurgiu
- 2019: Petrolul Ploiești
- 2020: Dinamo București
- 2021: Dinamo București
- 2021–2022: Ağrıspor (assistant)
Medal record
Representing Romania
Universiade
Gold medal – first place	1974 Nice	Team
- * Club domestic league appearances and goals

Gheorghe Mulțescu (Romanian pronunciation: [ˈɡe̯orɡe mulˈtsesku]; 13 November 1951 – 15 September 2024) was a Romanian professional football manager and player.

== Club career ==
Mulțescu was born on 13 November 1951 in Botoroaga, Romania and began playing junior-level football in 1963 at Steaua București. When it was time for him to start his senior career, Steaua's coach Ștefan Kovács was considering promoting him to the first team. However, Kovács left to coach Ajax Amsterdam in 1971. His replacement, Gheorghe Constantin, chose not to bring Mulțescu to the senior squad.

Eventually he went to play for Jiul Petroșani, making his Divizia A debut on 22 August 1971 under coach Eugen Iordache in a 0–0 draw against Crișul Oradea. His first achievement with The Miners was reaching the 1972 Cupa României final where Iordache used him the full 90 minutes in the 2–0 loss to Rapid București. In the 1973–74 season Mulțescu scored a career-best 15 goals in the league, and he netted a double in the 4–2 victory against Politehnica Timișoara in the 1974 Cupa României final, as coach Traian Ivănescu used him the entire match, helping Jiul win their first trophy. He then participated with the club in the 1974–75 European Cup Winners' Cup, playing in both legs of the 3–2 aggregate loss to Dundee United in the first round. Starting from 1976, for three seasons he made a successful partnership in Jiul's offence with Romanian football star Florea Dumitrache. The team reached the 1977–78 Balkans Cup final, with Mulțescu scoring in both legs of their 4–2 aggregate defeat to Rijeka.

Mulțescu was transferred to Dinamo București in 1979 where for several years he would form a successful offensive trio with Ionel Augustin and Costel Orac, together being called "AMO" by the fans, a nickname inspired by the initials of their family names. From 1982 to 1984, he earned three consecutive Divizia A titles. In the first one, he played 26 matches under coach Valentin Stănescu, scoring nine goals. In the following two seasons, he worked with coach Nicolae Dumitru who gave him 31 appearances in which he scored six goals in the first, and then 23 games with eight goals netted in the second. Mulțescu also won two Cupa României with Dinamo. He was used the entire match by Stănescu in the 3–2 victory over FC Baia Mare in the 1982 final, but did not play in the win against Steaua in the 1984 final. Over the years he would score two goals in the derby against Steaua in a draw and a victory in the league. Mulțescu played 20 games in which he scored nine goals in European competitions for The Red Dogs, helping the team eliminate Inter Milan in the 1981–82 UEFA Cup edition. He also appeared in seven matches in the 1983–84 European Cup campaign, scoring one goal against Kuusysi Lahti and two in the 5–3 aggregate victory against title holders Hamburg—the first a spectacular 40-meter shot—before the team reached the semi-finals, where they were defeated by Liverpool.

In 1985, Mulțescu returned to Jiul Petroșani, this time as a player-coach, managing to gain promotion from Divizia B to Divizia A. He spent his last season as a player in Divizia A at CSM Suceava, making his last appearance on 17 December 1987 in a 0–0 draw against Petrolul Ploiești, totaling 407 matches with 111 goals in the competition. In the final years of his career he worked as a player-coach for Autobuzul București, UTA Arad, Rapid București and Poiana Câmpina in the Romanian lower leagues.

Mulțescu won the Universiade gold medal with Romania's students football team in the 1974 edition that was held in France, playing alongside László Bölöni, Dan Păltinișanu, Romulus Chihaia and Paul Cazan.

== International career ==
Mulțescu played 12 matches and scored two goals for Romania (16/3 including Romania's Olympic team games), making his debut on 25 September 1974 under coach Valentin Stănescu in a 0–0 friendly draw against Bulgaria.

He played another two games and scored once against Bulgaria, as they lost the 1973–76 Balkan Cup final on the away goals rule after 3–3 on aggregate. He made two appearances and scored one goal in a 2–0 victory against Cyprus during the Euro 1980 qualifiers. Mulțescu's last game for the national team was a 1–0 away victory against Cyprus in the successful Euro 1984 qualifiers.

== Managerial career ==
Mulțescu managed several clubs, most of which were from Romania, where he was nicknamed Smurdul (English: The SMURD) after the Romanian emergency rescue service, because of his capacity for taking charge of teams who are going through a difficult time in mid-season and taking them on a points-winning path, especially those which were fighting to avoid relegation. In 1993 he led Romania's B squad in the Nehru Cup, reaching the final where they lost with 2–0 to North Korea. Mulțescu coached 13 teams in Divizia A, at some, he had several terms, including six periods at Dinamo, totaling 313 matches in the competition (112 victories, 74 draws, 127 losses). He also coached outside of Romania, in Turkey and Saudi Arabia, where his most successful period was his first term at Samsunspor from 1993 until 1997. There, he finished one season in fifth place and won the only trophy of his managerial career, the 1993–94 Balkans Cup. During that Samsunspor spell, Mulțescu brought several Romanian players to the club such as Bogdan Stelea, Daniel Timofte, Marius Cheregi, Ovidiu Hanganu, Silvian Dobre and Luca Constantin.

== Personal life and death ==
His son, Cătălin, was a goalkeeper, playing at various Liga I and Liga II clubs throughout his career. After he retired from professional football, he became a goalkeeping coach.

Sports commentator Ilie Dobre wrote a book about him titled Gigi Mulțescu, fotbalistul-nepereche (Gigi Mulțescu, the unpaired footballer), which was released in 2001. In 2009, Mulțescu was awarded the Honorary Citizen of Petroșani title.

Mulțescu died on 15 September 2024 in the Floreasca Hospital in Bucharest, at the age of 72. Over 200 people attended his funeral and he was buried with military honors in the "Reînvierea" Cemetery in the Colentina neighborhood of Bucharest.

== Career statistics ==
Scores and results list Romania's goal tally first, score column indicates score after each Mulțescu goal.

List of international goals scored by Gheorghe Mulțescu
#	Date	Venue	Cap	Opponent	Score	Result	Competition
1	28 November 1976	Stadionul 23 August, Bucharest, Romania	5	Bulgaria	3–2	3–2	1973–76 Balkan Cup
2	18 November 1979	Stadionul Dinamo, Bucharest, Romania	7	Cyprus	1–0	2–0	Euro 1980 qualifiers

== Honours ==
=== Player ===
Jiul Petroșani

- Divizia B: 1985–86
- Cupa României: 1973–74, runner-up 1971–72
- Balkans Cup runner-up: 1977–78

Dinamo București

- Divizia A: 1981–82, 1982–83, 1983–84
- Cupa României: 1981–82, 1983–84

=== Manager ===
Jiul Petroșani

- Divizia B: 1985–86

Romania B

- Nehru Cup runner-up: 1993

Samsunspor

- Balkans Cup: 1993–94
