= 1974 Cupa României final =

- Event: 1973–74 Cupa României
Jiul Petroşani	Politehnica Timișoara
4	2
- Date: 23 June 1974
- Venue: Republicii, Bucharest
- Referee: Victor Pădureanu (Bucharest)
- Attendance: 12,000

The 1974 Cupa României final was the 36th final of Romania's most prestigious football cup competition. It was disputed between Jiul Petroşani and Politehnica Timișoara, and was won by Jiul Petroşani after a game with 6 goals. It was the first cup for Jiul Petroşani.

== Match details ==
23 June 1974
17:30 EET

Jiul Petroşani	4–2	Politehnica Timișoara
Mulțescu 32', 47'; Rozsnyai 34'; Suciu 77'	Report	Surdan 36'; Bungău 86'

Republicii, Bucharest
Attendance: 12,000
Referee: Victor Pădureanu (Bucharest)

GK	(Romania) Gabriel Ion
DF	(Romania) Ion Nițu
DF	(Romania) Gogu Tonca
DF	(Romania) Andrei Stocker
DF	(Romania) Adrian Dodu
MF	(Romania) Alexandru Nagy
MF	(Romania) Petre Libardi
FW	(Romania) Arpad Suciu
FW	(Romania) Gheorghe Mulțescu
FW	(Romania) Adalbert Rozsnyai
FW	(Romania) Mihai Stoichiță
Manager:
(Romania) Traian Ivănescu

GK	(Romania) Mihai Jivan
DF	(Romania) Florin Mioc
DF	(Romania) Dan Păltinișanu
DF	(Romania) Petre Arnăutu
DF	(Romania) Ion Maier
MF	(Romania) Simion Surdan
MF	(Romania) Petre Mehedințu
MF	(Romania) Dan Lața (substituted off) 59'
FW	(Romania) Marin Dașcu
FW	(Romania) Marin Bojin
FW	(Romania) Zoltan Kovalcic (substituted off) 46'
Substitutions:
FW	(Romania) Ionel Bungău (substituted in) 46'
FW	(Romania) Lazăr Pârvu (substituted in) 59'
Manager:
(Romania) Ion V. Ionescu

== See also ==
- List of Cupa României finals
