= Iordan Angelescu =

Romanian footballer

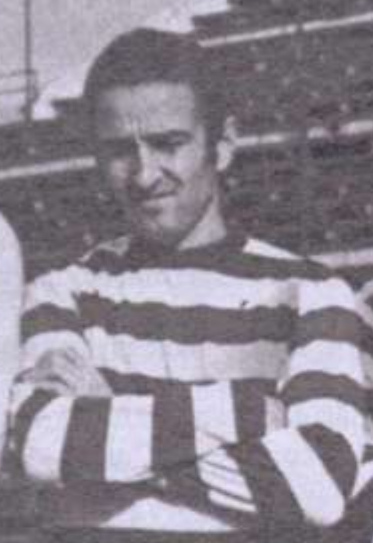
- Angelescu with Rapid in 1970

Personal information
- Date of birth: 15 June 1946
- Place of birth: Bucharest, Romania
- Date of death: 12 November 2015 (aged 69)
- Height: 1.75 m (5 ft 9 in)
- Position: Central midfielder

Senior career*
Years	Team	Apps	(Gls)
1966–1967	Politehnica București		
1967–1968	Universitatea Cluj	25	(1)
1968–1976	Rapid București	211	(9)
1976–1979	Corvinul Hunedoara	71	(1)
1979–1980	Progresul București	10	(0)
1980–1981	Rapid București		
Total		317	(11)

International career
1967–1969	Romania U23	2	(0)
1970	Romania B	4	(0)
- * Club domestic league appearances and goals

Iordan Angelescu (15 June 1946 – 12 November 2015) was a Romanian footballer who played as a midfielder.

== Club career ==
Angelescu was born on 15 June 1946 in Bucharest, Romania and began playing football in 1966 at Divizia B club Politehnica București. One year later, he joined Universitatea Cluj, making his Divizia A debut under coach Nicolae Szoboszlay on 20 August 1967 in a 3–2 away loss to ASA Târgu Mureș.

In 1968, Angelescu went to play for Rapid București. He helped them win the 1971–72 Cupa României, playing the entire match under coach Bazil Marian in the 2–0 win over Jiul Petroșani in the final. Angelescu played for The Railwaymen in a total of 14 games in European competitions. He played five matches in Rapid's 1971–72 UEFA Cup campaign as the team reached the round of 16 by eliminating Napoli and Legia Warsaw before falling to the eventual tournament winners, Tottenham. He also played four games during the 1972–73 European Cup Winners' Cup, helping the team reach the quarter-finals by defeating Landskrona BoIS and Rapid Wien prior to their elimination by the eventual finalists, Leeds United. Rapid suffered relegation at the end of the 1973–74 season, but Angelescu stayed with the club, helping it earn promotion back to the first league after one year. The team also won the 1974–75 Cupa României, with Angelescu playing under coach Ion Motroc as a starter in the 2–1 victory against Universitatea Craiova in the final.

In 1976, Angelescu went for a three-season spell at Corvinul Hunedoara. There, he made his last Divizia A appearance on 24 June 1979 in a 3–1 home win over Politehnica Timișoara, totaling 279 matches with 11 goals in the competition. In 1979, Angelescu joined Divizia B club Progresul București which he helped earn promotion to the first league after one season at the expense of his former club, Rapid. However, Angelescu stayed at Divizia B level, returning to Rapid where he ended his career in the 1980–81 season.

== International career ==
From 1967 to 1970, Angelescu played two games for Romania's under-23 team and four matches for the B squad.

== Death ==
Angelescu died on 12 November 2015 at the age of 69.

== Honours ==
Rapid București

- Divizia B: 1974–75
- Cupa României: 1971–72, 1974–75

Progresul București

- Divizia B: 1979–80
