= Adalbert Rozsnyai =

Romanian footballer

Personal information
- Date of birth: 17 April 1952 (age 74)
- Place of birth: Băiuț, Romania
- Position: Forward

Senior career*
Years	Team	Apps	(Gls)
1969–1970	Chimistul Baia Mare		
1970–1972	Minerul Baia Mare	44	(22)
1972–1976	Jiul Petroșani	128	(45)
1976–1977	Dinamo București	20	(3)
1977–1986	Maramureș Baia Mare (Note: The statistics for the 1985–86 Divizia B season are unavailable.)	237	(83)
Total		429	(153)

International career
1972–1975	Romania U23	5	(2)
1975–1976	Romania B	3	(0)

Managerial career
- 2005–2006: FC Baia Mare
- * Club domestic league appearances and goals

Adalbert Rozsnyai (born 17 April 1952) is a Romanian former football player and coach.

== Club career ==
Rozsnyai was born on 17 April 1952 in Băiuț, Romania. He began playing football in 1969 at Divizia C club Chimistul Baia Mare. One year later, he went to play for Minerul Baia Mare in Divizia B. In 1972, he joined Jiul Petroșani, making his Divizia A debut on 9 September under coach Ștefan Coidum in a 3–0 away loss to Steaua București. In his debut season with The Miners, he scored 13 goals which made him the fourth-leading championship scorer tied with Argeș Pitești's Ion Roșu. Rozsnyai helped Jiul win its first trophy, the 1973–74 Cupa României, as he played the entire match and scored a goal under coach Traian Ivănescu in the 4–2 victory against Politehnica Timișoara in the final. Afterwards he played in both legs and scored one goal against Dundee United in the first round of the 1974–75 European Cup Winners' Cup which was lost with 3–2 on aggregate.

In 1976, Rozsnyai went to play for Dinamo București. He played 20 matches and scored three goals under coach Ion Nunweiller, as the club won the title in his single season spent there. In the same season, he played in both legs of the 2–1 aggregate loss to AC Milan in the 1976–77 UEFA Cup first round. Subsequently, Rozsnyai joined Maramureș Baia Mare in Divizia B, scoring 15 goals in the 1977–78 season to help them gain first-league promotion. However, three seasons later, the team was relegated back to the second league. While the club was playing in Divizia B, it reached the 1982 Cupa României final where Rozsnyai played the entire match under coach Paul Popescu in the 3–2 loss to his former side, Dinamo. Following this, he played in both legs of the 5–2 aggregate loss to Real Madrid in the first round of the 1982–83 European Cup Winners' Cup. In the same season, he scored 17 league goals to help Baia Mare gain Divizia A promotion. On 19 May 1985, Rozsnyai made his last appearance in the Romanian top-league in a 3–1 away win over Corvinul Hunedoara, totaling 291 matches with 86 goals in the competition. However, at the end of that season, the team suffered relegation once again to Divizia B, where Rozsnyai played one more season before retiring.

== International career ==
From 1972 to 1976, Rozsnyai made several appearances for Romania's under-23 and B sides.

== Managerial career ==
Rozsnyai coached FC Baia Mare as an assistant coach and head coach. In the latter role, he led the club to Divizia B promotion at the end of the 2005–06 season.

== Honours ==
=== Player ===
Jiul Petroșani

- Cupa României: 1973–74

Dinamo București

- Divizia A: 1976–77

FC Baia Mare

- Divizia B: 1977–78, 1982–83
- Cupa României runner-up: 1981–82

=== Manager ===
Maramureș Baia Mare

- Divizia C: 2005–06
