= List of FC Dinamo București managers =

This is a list of Dinamo București managers by season since its founding in 1948.

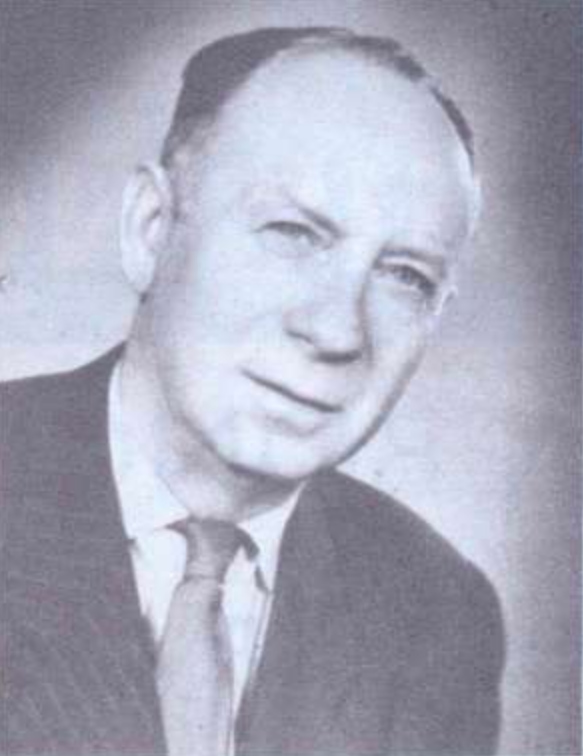
Coloman Braun-Bogdan was Dinamo's first manager.

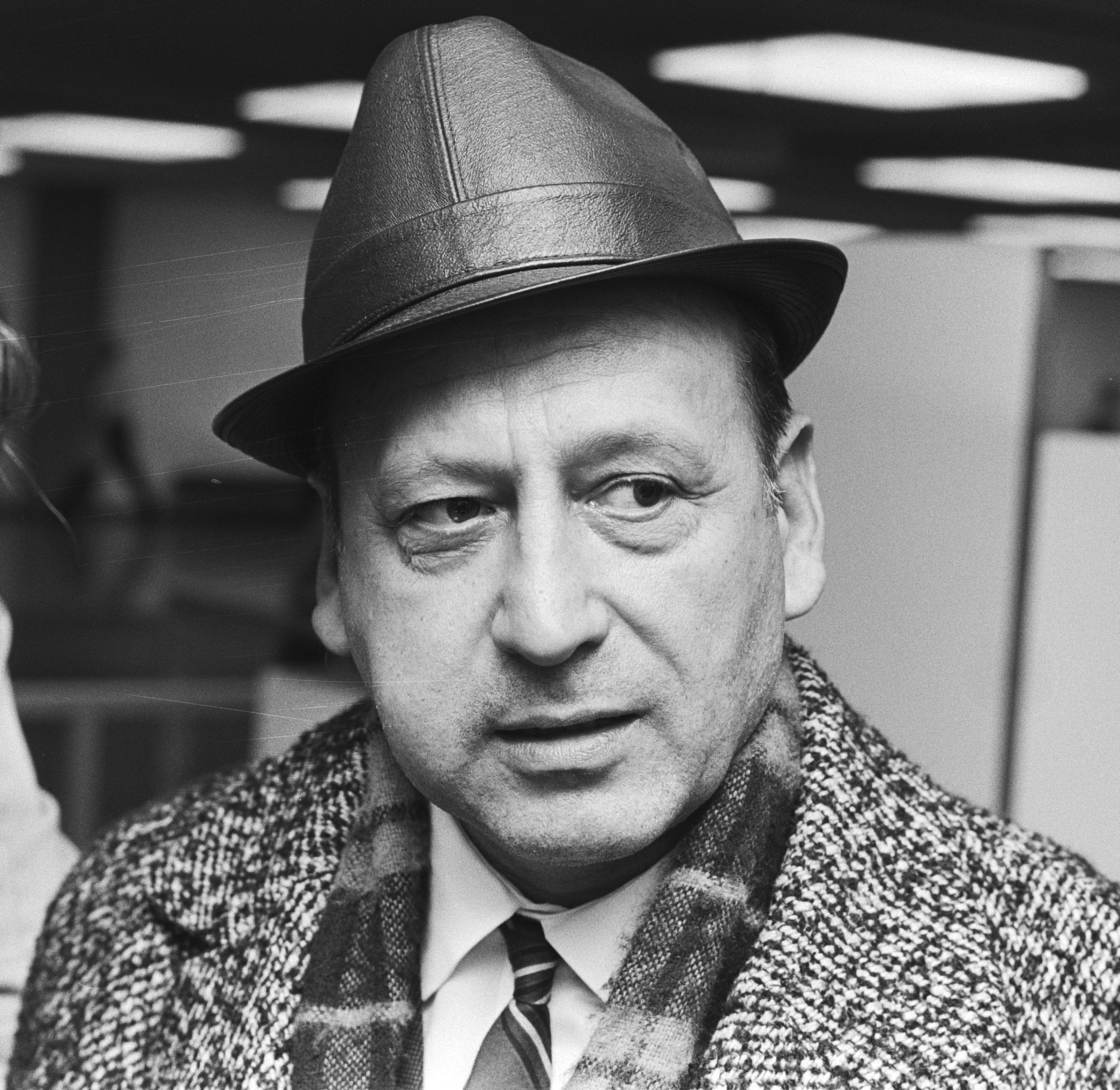
Angelo Niculescu led the club to its first Liga I title.

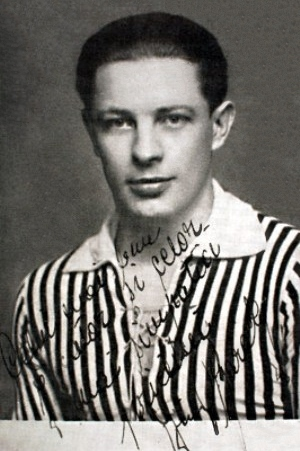
Under Romanian-Hungarian coach Iuliu Baratky, the club won its first Romanian Cup.

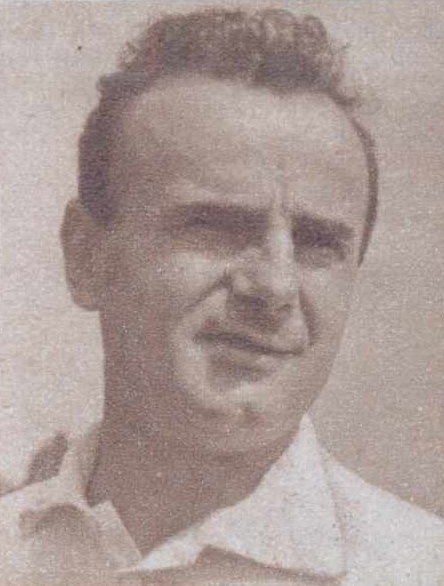
Traian Ionescu won four titles and a Romanian Cup with the club.

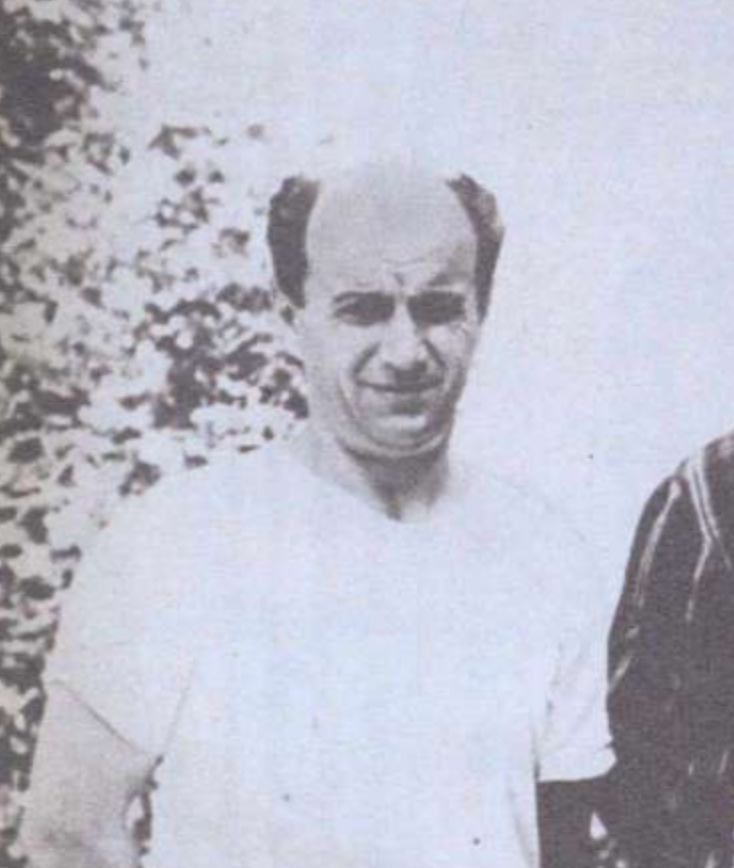
Nicolae Dumitru won seven titles, two Romanian Cups, and led the club to the 1983–84 European Cup semi-finals.

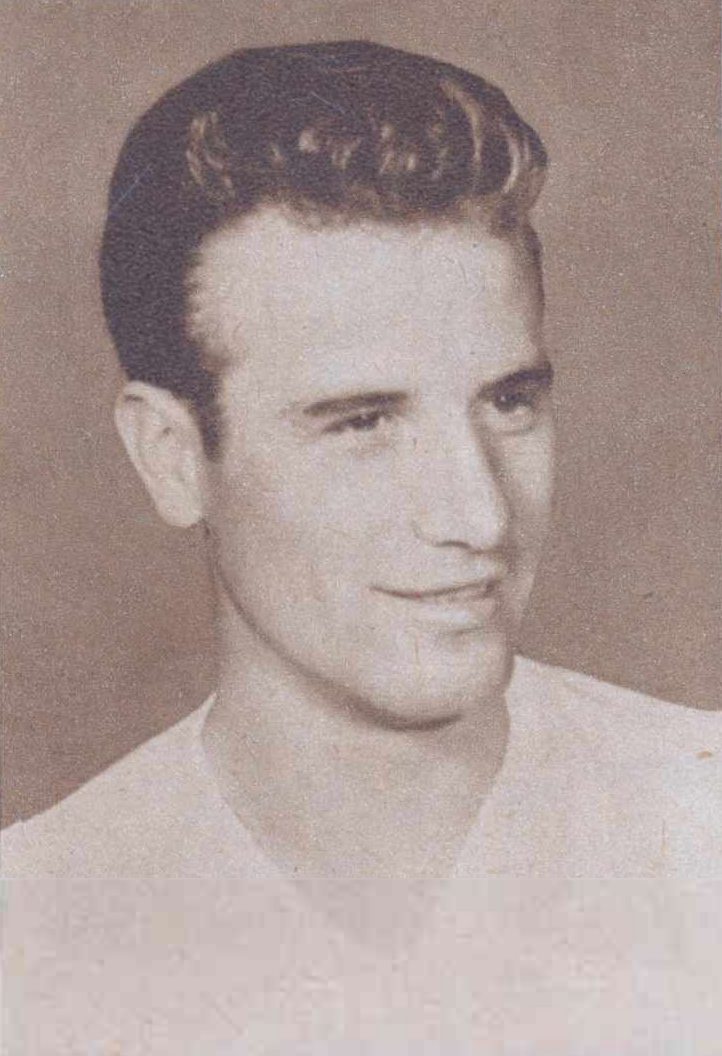
Ion Nunweiller, after winning five Liga I titles with Dinamo as a player, went on to win two more as head coach and one as an assistant.

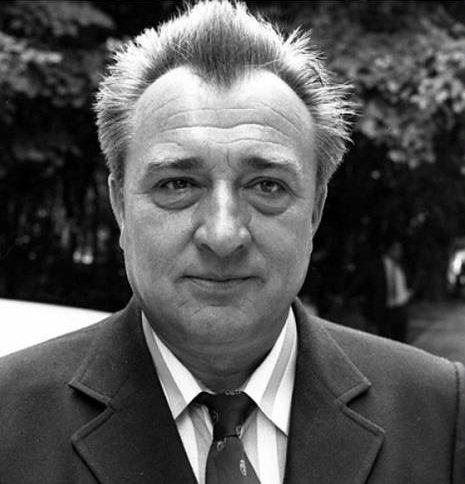
Valentin Stănescu spent two years as Dinamo's manager, winning two trophies.

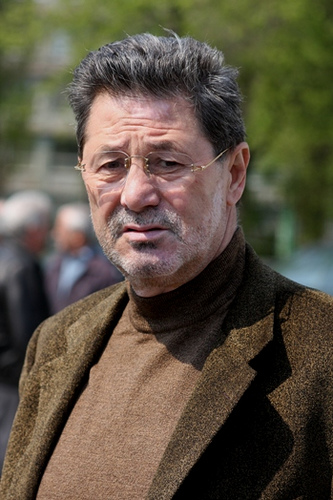
After winning eight trophies with the club as a player, Cornel Dinu won three as a manager.

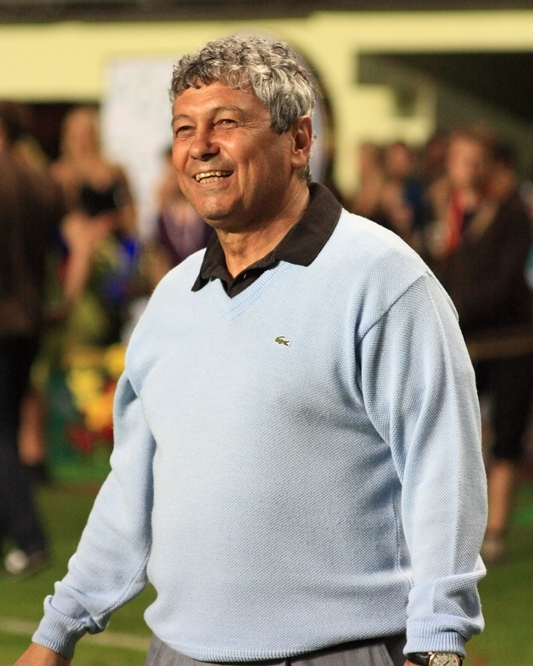
Mircea Lucescu spent almost five years as Dinamo's manager, winning one Liga I title, two Romanian Cups, and reaching the 1989–90 European Cup Winners' Cup semi-finals.

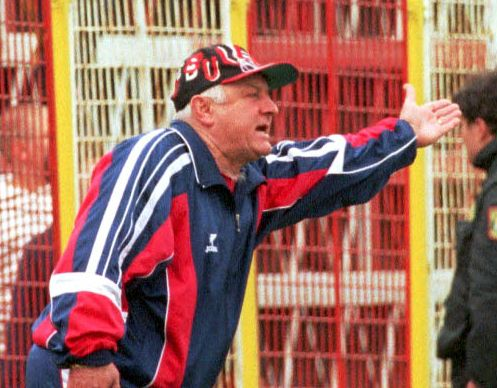
Florin Halagian won the 1991–92 title without losing a single game.

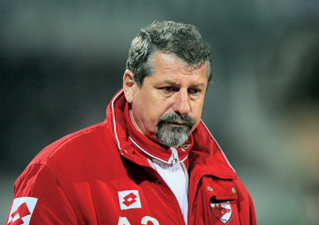
Marin Ion had three spells as Dinamo's manager, winning the Liga I title in the first one.

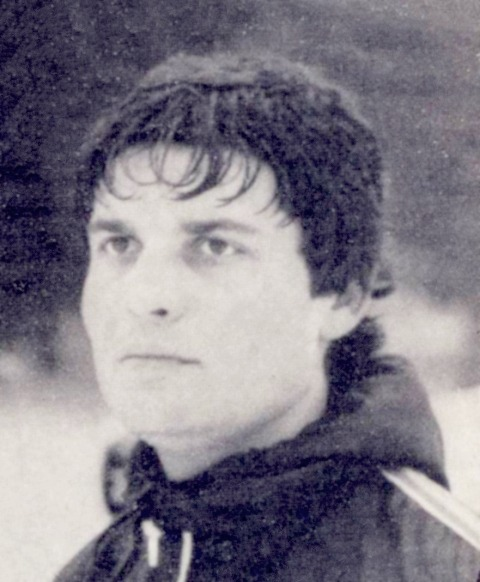
Ioan Andone won five trophies as Dinamo's manager.

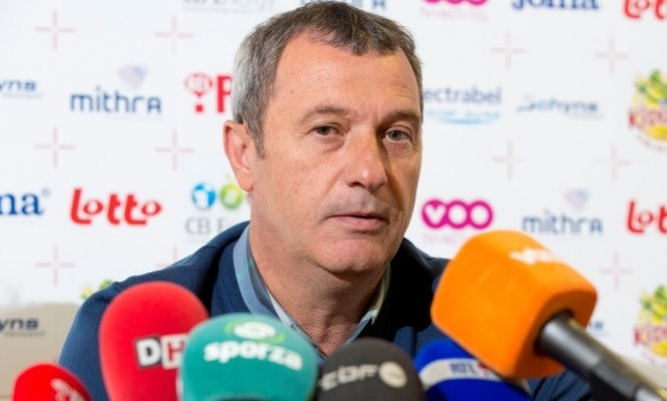
Mircea Rednic won the Liga I title in his first year with Dinamo.

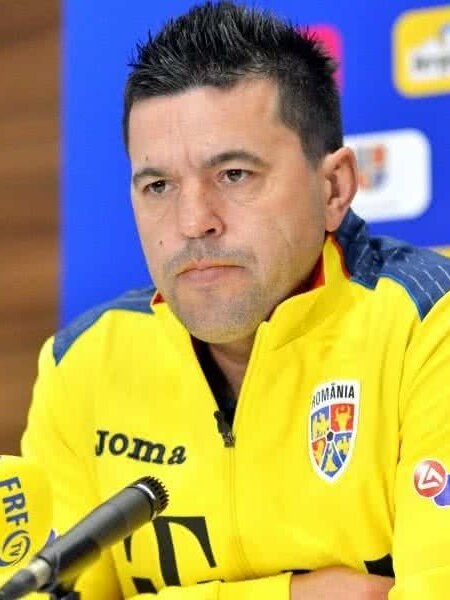
Cosmin Contra won the first Cupa Ligii in the club's history.

Season	Name	Nationality	Period	Honours
1948–49	Coloman Braun-Bogdan	Romania	–Nov	
1948–49	Rudolf Wetzer	Romania	Feb–	
1950		Romania		
1951		Romania		
1951	Iuliu Baratky	Romania	–July	
1952	Iuliu Baratky	Romania		
1953	Iuliu Baratky	Romania	–May	
1953	Angelo Niculescu	Romania	May–	
1954	Angelo Niculescu & Colea Vâlcov	Romania		
1955	Angelo Niculescu	Romania		Romanian Championship
1956	Angelo Niculescu	Romania		
1957–58	Iuliu Baratky	Romania		
1958–59	Iuliu Baratky	Romania		Romanian Cup
1959–60	Iuliu Baratky	Romania	–Oct	
1959–60	Dumitru Nicolae & Traian Ionescu	Romania	Nov–	
1960–61	Dumitru Nicolae & Traian Ionescu	Romania		
1961–62	Traian Ionescu	Romania	–December	
1961–62	Constantin Teașcă	Romania	December–March	
1961–62	Dumitru Nicolae	Romania	–April	Romanian Championship
1962–63	Dumitru Nicolae	Romania	–March	
1962–63	Traian Ionescu	Romania	March–	Romanian Championship
1963–64	Dumitru Nicolae & Traian Ionescu	Romania		Romanian Championship Romanian Cup
1964–65	Angelo Niculescu	Romania		Romanian Championship
1965–66	Angelo Niculescu & Traian Ionescu	Romania		
1966–67	Traian Ionescu	Romania		
1967–68	Traian Ionescu	Romania	–December	
1967–68	Bazil Marian	Romania		Romanian Cup
1968–69	Bazil Marian	Romania		
1969–70	Dumitru Nicolae	Romania		
1970–71	Dumitru Nicolae	Romania	–March	
1970–71	Dumitru Nicolae & Traian Ionescu	Romania	March–	Romanian Championship
1971–72	Dumitru Nicolae	Romania		
1972–73	Ion Nunweiller	Romania		Romanian Championship
1973–74	Ion Nunweiller	Romania	–March	
1973–74	Dumitru Nicolae	Romania	March-	
1974–75	Dumitru Nicolae	Romania		Romanian Championship
1975–76	Dumitru Nicolae	Romania	–March	
1975–76	Ion Nunweiller	Romania	March–	
1976–77	Ion Nunweiller	Romania		Romanian Championship
1977–78	Ion Nunweiller	Romania		
1978–79	Ion Nunweiller	Romania		
1979–80	Angelo Niculescu	Romania		
1980–81	Valentin Stănescu	Romania		
1981–82	Valentin Stănescu	Romania		Romanian Championship Romanian Cup
1982–83	Dumitru Nicolae	Romania		Romanian Championship
1983–84	Dumitru Nicolae	Romania		Romanian Championship Romanian Cup
1984–85	Cornel Dinu	Romania	–March	
1984–85	Vasile Anghel	Romania	March–	
1985–86	Constantin Cernăianu	Romania	–Nov	
1985–86	Florin Cheran	Romania	Nov	
1985–86	Mircea Lucescu	Romania	Nov–	Romanian Cup
1986–87	Mircea Lucescu	Romania		
1987–88	Mircea Lucescu	Romania		
1988–89	Mircea Lucescu	Romania		
1989–90	Mircea Lucescu	Romania		Romanian Championship Romanian Cup
1990–91	Gheorghe Mulțescu	Romania		
1991–92	Florin Halagian	Romania		Romanian Championship
1992–93	Florin Halagian	Romania	–October	
1992–93	Alexandru Moldovan	Romania	October–May	
1992–93	Florin Halagian	Romania	May–	
1993–94	Florin Halagian	Romania		
1994–95	Ion Moldovan	Romania	–Dec	
1994–95	Remus Vlad	Romania	Dec–	
1995–96	Remus Vlad	Romania	–November	
1995–96	Florin Cheran	Romania	Nov–Feb	
1995–96	Marian Bondrea	Romania	Feb–	
1996–97	Marian Bondrea	Romania	–Dec	
1996–97	Cornel Dinu	Romania	Dec	
1996–97	Cornel Țălnar	Romania	Dec–	
1997–98	Viorel Hizo	Romania	–April	
1997–98	Cornel Dinu	Romania	April–	
1998–99	Cornel Dinu	Romania		
1999–00	Cornel Dinu	Romania		Romanian Championship Romanian Cup
2000–01	Cornel Dinu	Romania		Romanian Cup
2001–02	Marin Ion	Romania	–April	
2001–02	Cornel Dinu	Romania	April–	Romanian Championship
2002–03	Ion Moldovan	Romania	September	
2002–03	Florin Marin	Romania	Sept–Oct	
2002–03	Cornel Dinu	Romania	Oct–March	
2002–03	Ioan Andone	Romania	March–	Romanian Cup
2003–04	Ioan Andone	Romania		Romanian Championship Romanian Cup
2004–05	Ioan Andone	Romania		Romanian Cup
2005–06	Ioan Andone	Romania	–25 Dec	Romanian Supercup
2005–06	Esteban Vigo	Spain	28 Dec–28 Feb	
2005–06	Marin Ion	Romania	28 Feb–4 April	
2005–06	Florin Marin	Romania	4 April – 30 June	
2006–07	Mircea Rednic	Romania	1 July–	Romanian Championship
2007–08	Mircea Rednic	Romania	–Sept 2	
2007–08	Walter Zenga	Italy	31 Aug–24 Nov	
2007–08	Cornel Țălnar	Romania	25 Nov–4 March	
2007–08	Gheorghe Mulțescu	Romania	5 March – 4 April	
2007–08	Cornel Țălnar	Romania	April–	
2008–09	Mircea Rednic	Romania	1 July – 15 June	
2009–10	Dario Bonetti	Italy	23 June–2 Oct	
2009–10	Marin Ion	Romania	2 Oct–24 Oct	
2009–10	Cornel Țălnar	Romania	24 Oct–1 June	
2010–11	Ioan Andone	Romania	1 June – 4 July	
2011–12	Liviu Ciobotariu	Romania	11 July – 10 April	
2011–12	Dario Bonetti	Italy	10 April–	Romanian Cup
2012–13	Dario Bonetti	Italy	–14 Nov	Romanian Supercup
2012–13	Dorinel Munteanu	Romania	15 Nov–27 Dec	
2012–13	Cornel Țălnar	Romania	28 Dec–29 May	
2013–14	Gheorghe Mulțescu	Romania	5 June–22 Sept	
2013–14	Flavius Stoican	Romania	23 Sept–	
2014–15	Flavius Stoican	Romania	–12 Nov	
2014–15	Ionel Dănciulescu	Romania	13 Nov–31 Dec	
2014–15	Mihai Teja	Romania	7 Jan–12 Mar	
2014–15	Flavius Stoican	Romania	12 Mar–6 May	
2014–15	Mircea Rednic	Romania	6 May–	
2015–16	Mircea Rednic	Romania		
2016–17	Mircea Rednic	Romania	–20 May	
2016–17	Ioan Andone	Romania	23 May–14 Feb	
2016–17	Cosmin Contra	Romania	17 February–	League Cup
2017–18	Cosmin Contra	Romania	–17 September	
2017–18	Vasile Miriuță	Hungary	21 Sept–26 Feb	
2017–18	Florin Bratu	Romania	26 February–	
2018–19	Florin Bratu	Romania	–22 September	
2018–19	Claudiu Niculescu	Romania	24 Sept–13 Oct	
2018–19	Mircea Rednic	Romania	13 October–	
2019–20	Mircea Rednic	Romania	–3 June	
2019–20	Eugen Neagoe	Romania	3 June – 12 August	
2019–20	Dušan Uhrin Jr.	Czech Republic	13 August – 9 March	
2019–20	Adrian Mihalcea	Romania	11 March – 14 July	
2019–20	Gheorghe Mulțescu	Romania	14 July–	
2020–21	Gheorghe Mulțescu	Romania	–26 August	
2020–21	Cosmin Contra	Romania	26 August – 3 December	
2020–21	Ionel Gane	Romania	3 December – 15 March	
2020–21	Gheorghe Mulțescu	Romania	15 March – 13 April	
2020–21	Dušan Uhrin Jr.	Czech Republic	13 April – 10 July	
2021–22	Dario Bonetti	Italy	14 July–15 September	
2021–22	Sorin Colceag	Romania	15 September–29 September	
2021–22	Mircea Rednic	Romania	29 September–21 December	
2021–22	Flavius Stoican	Romania	21 December–9 March	
2021–22	Dušan Uhrin Jr.	Czech Republic	9 March – 1 June	
2022–23	Ovidiu Burcă	Romania	22 July–	
2023–24	Ovidiu Burcă	Romania	–28 November	
2023–24	Željko Kopić	Croatia	1 December–	
2024–25	Željko Kopić	Croatia		
2025–26	Željko Kopić	Croatia		
2026–27	Nuno Campos	Portugal		
