= Nicolae Lupescu =

Romanian footballer (1940–2017)

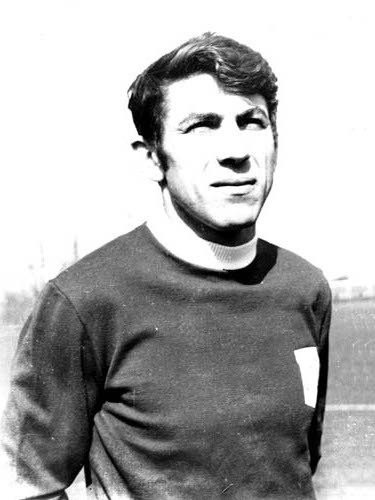
- Lupescu pictured in the late 1960s

Personal information
- Date of birth: 17 December 1940
- Place of birth: Bucharest, Romania
- Date of death: 6 September 2017 (aged 76)
- Place of death: Bucharest, Romania
- Height: 1.77 m (5 ft 10 in)
- Position: Defender

Youth career
- ICAR București
- 1958–1960: Flacăra Roșie București

Senior career*
| Years | Team | Apps | (Gls) |
| 1960–1961 | Academia Militară București | | |
| 1961–1962 | Olimpia București | | |
| 1962–1972 | Rapid București | 244 | (8) |
| 1972–1977 | Admira Wacker | 134 | (9) |
| Total | | 378 | (17) |

International career
| 1964–1972 | Romania (Note: Including one appearance for Romania's Olympic team.) | 21 | (2) |

Managerial career
- 1977–1978: Mecanică Fină București
- 1978–1980: Rapid București
- 1980–1981: Mecanică Fină București
- 1981–1982: Șoimii Sibiu
- 1983–1984: Gloria Buzău
- 1985–1986: Rapid București
- 1988: Progresul București
- * Club domestic league appearances and goals

Nicolae Lupescu (17 December 1940 – 6 September 2017) was a Romanian professional football defender and manager.

== Club career ==
=== Early career ===
Lupescu was born on 17 December 1940 in Bucharest, Romania. He began playing junior-level football in 1954 at ICAR București, afterwards moving to Flacăra Roșie București. He started his senior career by playing two seasons in Divizia B, the first one at Academia Militară București and the second at Olimpia București.

=== Rapid București ===
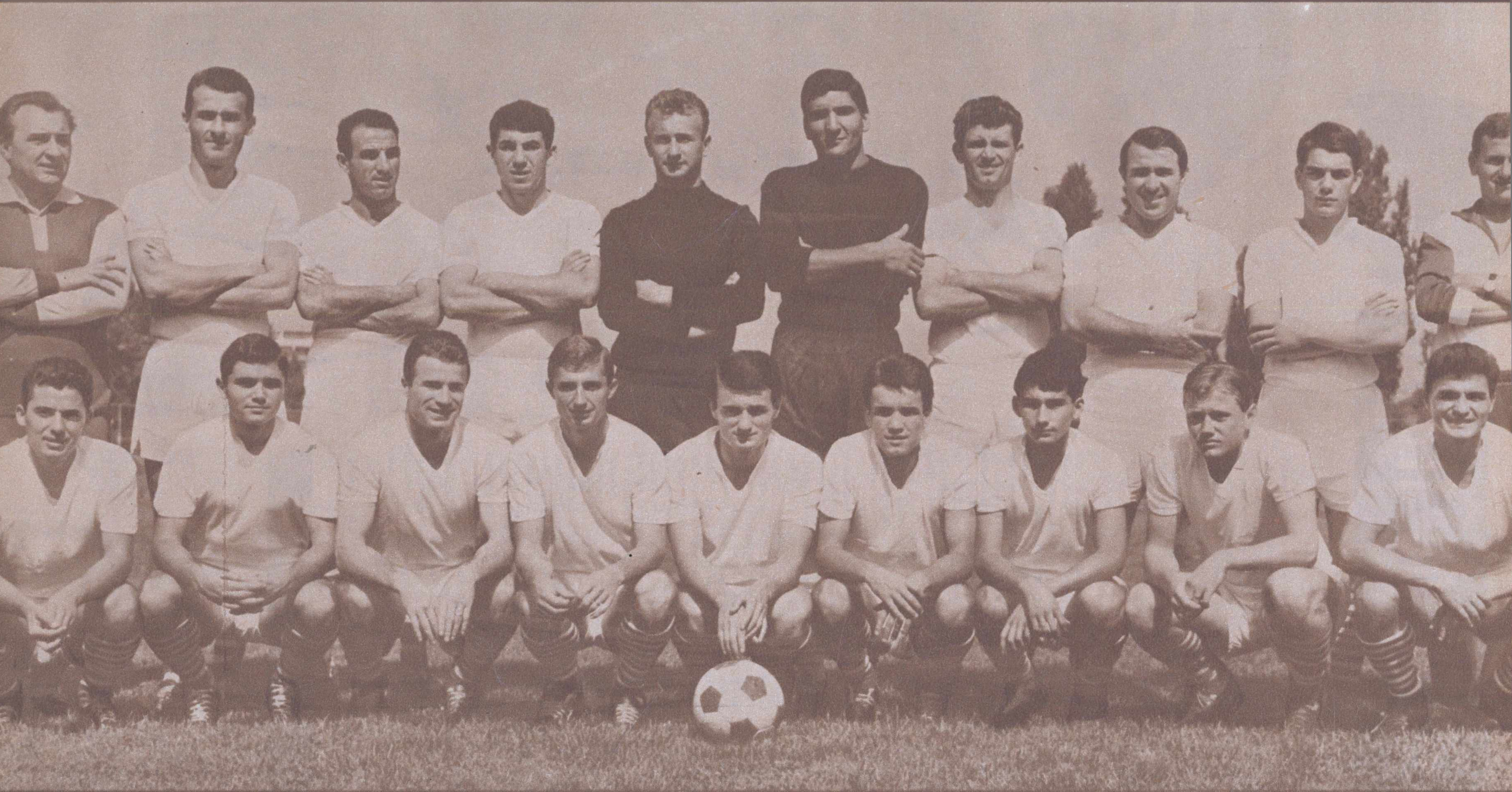
Lupescu (fourth from the left, back row) with Rapid București in 1965

Lupescu was brought to Rapid București by coach Nicolae Roșculeț, where he debuted in Divizia A on 16 September 1962 in a 4–2 victory against Farul Constanța. He remained with Rapid for ten seasons, winning the title in the 1966–67 season, being used by coach Valentin Stănescu in 26 matches in which he scored one goal. In the following season he played four games in the 1967–68 European Cup, helping The Railwaymen eliminate Trakia Plovdiv and advance to the following round where they were eliminated by Juventus.

Lupescu also won two Balkans Cup and the 1971–72 Cupa României, being used the entire match by coach Bazil Marian in the 2–0 win over Jiul Petroșani in the final. He played in all six games of the 1971–72 UEFA Cup campaign as the team reached the round of 16 by eliminating Napoli and Legia Warsaw before being knocked out by the eventual winners, Tottenham. For the way he played in 1970, Lupescu was placed fifth in the ranking for the Romanian Footballer of the Year award, in the following year being third. Lupescu has a total of 244 matches and eight goals scored in Divizia A.

=== Admira Wacker ===
During Romania's communist era, transfers of Romanian footballers outside the country were rarely allowed. However, Lupescu convinced Ștefan Andrei, who was the Secretary for Foreign Relations of the Central Committee, to help him gain the regime's approval for his transfer to Admira Wacker in 1972. Rapid received $40,000 for this transfer.

Lupescu made his Austrian Bundesliga debut on 15 September 1972 under coach Ernst Ocwirk in a 0–0 draw against Austria Klagenfurt. The team finished the season in fourth place, which would be the club's best championship performance during his five seasons spent there. He also helped Admira eliminate Inter Milan in the first round of the 1973–74 UEFA Cup. Lupescu made 134 appearances in the Austrian Bundesliga, scoring nine goals.

== International career ==
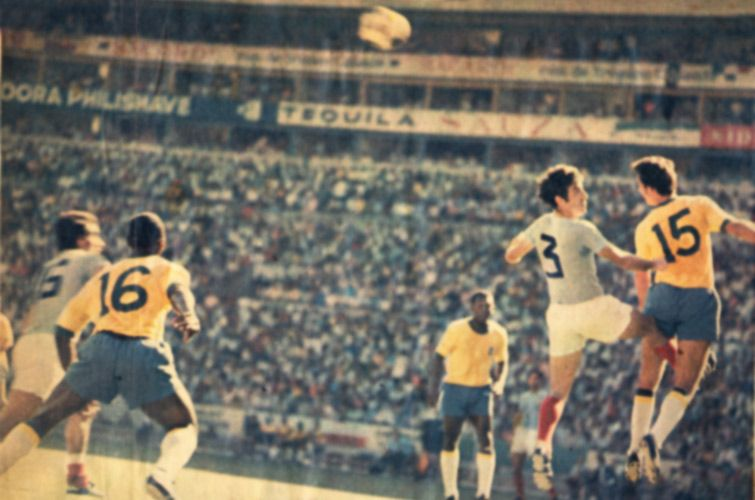
Lupescu (number 3) in action against Brazil at the 1970 World Cup

Lupescu earned 20 caps and scored two goals for Romania, all under the guidance of coach Angelo Niculescu, making his debut on 25 June 1967 in a 1–0 home loss to Italy in the Euro 1968 qualifiers. Niculescu used him for the entirety of all three games in the 1970 World Cup final tournament which were a win against Czechoslovakia and losses to England and Brazil, as his side failed to progress from their group. He played eight matches and scored two goals in the 1972 Euro qualifiers, managing to reach the quarter-finals where Romania was defeated by Hungary, who advanced to the final tournament.

Lupescu was Romania's captain in a friendly against the Netherlands that ended with a 2–0 loss. He made his last appearance for the national team on 17 June 1972 in a 3–3 friendly draw against Italy.

For representing his country at the 1970 World Cup, Lupescu was decorated by President of Romania Traian Băsescu on 25 March 2008 with the Ordinul "Meritul Sportiv" – (The Medal "The Sportive Merit") class III.

=== International goals ===
Scores and results list Romania's goal tally first, score column indicates score after each Lupescu goal.

List of international goals scored by Nicolae Lupescu
| # | Date | Venue | Cap | Opponent | Score | Result | Competition |
|---|---|---|---|---|---|---|---|
| 1 | 22 September 1971 | Olympic Stadium, Helsinki, Finland | 13 | Finland | 2–0 | 4–0 | 1972 Euro qualifiers |
| 2 | 24 November 1971 | Stadionul 23 August, București, Romania | 15 | Wales | 1–0 | 2–0 | 1972 Euro qualifiers |

== Managerial career ==
Lupescu started his coaching career in 1977 at Divizia C team Mecanică Fină București. Afterwards, he worked at Rapid București in Divizia B where in the 1979–80 season he was close to earning a promotion to the first league. Then he worked at Șoimii Sibiu and Gloria Buzău, helping the latter get promoted to Divizia A in the 1983–84 season. He made a comeback at Rapid, leading the team over the course of the 1985–86 Divizia A season. Lupescu's last coaching spell took place in 1988 at Progresul București.

== Personal life and death ==
He was the father of professional football player Ioan Lupescu.

On 6 September 2017, Lupescu died at the Fundeni hospital in Bucharest at age 76. Shortly after his death, his former teammate from Rapid, Viorel Kraus described him: "He impressed us from the start. He was quiet, tight-lipped, but a true professional. When two colleagues were arguing, he intervened. He said to the one who screamed the loudest: "Stop talking in big letters!". This saying remained famous among us".

== Honours ==
=== Player ===
Rapid București

- Divizia A: 1966–67
- Cupa României: 1971–72
- Balkans Cup: 1963–64, 1964–66

Individual

- Romanian Footballer of the Year third place: 1971

=== Manager ===
Gloria Buzău

- Divizia B: 1983–84
