= Marian Petreanu =

Romanian footballer

Personal information
- Date of birth: 8 September 1950 (age 76)
- Place of birth: Bucharest, Romania
- Position: Central midfielder

Youth career
- 1967–1968: Rapid București

Senior career*
Years	Team	Apps	(Gls)
1968–1974	Rapid București	118	(9)
1974–1977	Sportul Studențesc București	50	(1)
1978–1980	Gloria Buzău	21	(1)
Total		189	(11)

International career
1969–1972	Romania U23	14	(2)
1972	Romania	1	(0)
- * Club domestic league appearances and goals

Marian Petreanu (born 8 September 1950) is a Romanian former football midfielder.

== Club career ==
Petreanu was born on 8 September 1950 in Bucharest, Romania and began playing junior-level football in 1967 at local club Rapid. On 25 August 1968, he made his Divizia A debut under coach Valentin Stănescu in Rapid's 1–1 draw against ASA Târgu Mureș. Subsequently, he won the 1971–72 Cupa României, being sent by coach Bazil Marian in the 66th minute in the 2–0 win over Jiul Petroșani in the final. Petreanu represented The Railwaymen in eight matches with one goal scored in European competitions. During the 1971–72 UEFA Cup campaign, he played in a 2–0 loss to the eventual tournament winners, Tottenham. He also played five games in the 1972–73 European Cup Winners' Cup, helping the team reach the quarter-finals by eliminating Landskrona BoIS and Rapid Wien—with Petreanu scoring against the latter—before they were knocked out by the eventual finalists, Leeds United. In 1974, Petreanu went to play for a three-season spell at Sportul Studențesc București. Afterwards, he joined Gloria Buzău where he made his last Divizia A appearance on 8 March 1980 in a 1–1 draw against ASA Târgu Mureș, totaling 189 matches with 11 goals in the competition.

== International career ==
From 1969 to 1972, Petreanu was consistently featured for Romania's under-23 side.

Petreanu played one game for Romania on 30 January 1972, when coach Gheorghe Ola sent him to replace Constantin Radu in the 46th minute of a 4–2 friendly victory against Morocco.

== Honours ==
Rapid București

- Cupa României: 1971–72
