= Stelian Marin =

Romanian footballer

Personal information
- Date of birth: 6 March 1950 (age 76)
- Place of birth: Bucharest, Romania
- Position: Central midfielder

Senior career*
Years	Team	Apps	(Gls)
1968–1981	Rapid București (Note: The statistics for the 1977–78, 1978–79, 1979–80 and 1980–81 Divizia B seasons are unavailable.)	204	(26)
1982–1984	Carpați Mârșa (Note: The statistics for the 1983–84 Divizia B season are unavailable.)	31	(6)
Total		235	(32)

International career
1973	Romania U21	1	(0)
1972–1973	Romania U23	3	(0)
- * Club domestic league appearances and goals

Stelian Marin (born 6 March 1950) is a Romanian footballer who played as a midfielder.

== Club career ==
Marin was born on 6 March 1950 in Bucharest, Romania. He began playing football at Rapid București, making his Divizia A debut on 8 June 1969 under coach Marian Bărbulescu in a 2–1 home win over Crișul Oradea. Subsequently, he played in a 4–1 loss to Vitória de Setúbal in the first round of the 1969–70 Inter-Cities Fairs Cup, scoring his side's goal. Marin helped Rapid win the 1971–72 Cupa României under coach Bazil Marian, netting the first goal in the 2–0 win over Jiul Petroșani in the final. He then took part in the 1972–73 European Cup Winners' Cup campaign, playing all six games and helping the team reach the quarter-finals by eliminating Landskrona BoIS—against whom he scored two goals—and Rapid Wien, before ultimately being knocked out by the eventual finalists, Leeds United. The club suffered relegation at the end of that season, but Marin stayed with the team, helping it gain promotion back to the first league after one year. They also reached the 1975 Cupa României final and Marin played the entire match under coach Ion Motroc in the 2–1 victory against Universitatea Craiova. Afterwards, he played in both legs of the 1975–76 European Cup Winners' Cup, where Rapid were eliminated in the first round with 2–1 on aggregate by Anderlecht, who eventually won the competition. On 30 June 1977, he made his last Divizia A appearance in a 2–1 loss to FC Constanța, totaling 175 matches with 22 goals scored in the competition. However, he suffered another relegation with Rapid at the end of the 1976–77 season. In 1982, Marin joined Carpați Mârșa where he ended his career in 1984.

== International career ==
From 1972 to 1973, Marin played several matches for Romania's under-21 and under-23 national teams.

== Honours ==
=== Player ===
Rapid București

- Divizia B: 1974–75
- Cupa României: 1971–72, 1974–75
