= 1972 Cupa României final =

- Event: 1971–72 Cupa României
Rapid București	Jiul Petroșani
2	0
- Date: 2 July 1972
- Venue: 23 August, Bucharest
- Referee: Gheorghe Limona (Bucharest)
- Attendance: 30,000

The 1972 Cupa României final was the 34th final of Romania's most prestigious football cup competition. It was disputed between Rapid București and Jiul Petroșani, and was won by Rapid București after a game with 2 goals. It was the 8th cup for Rapid București.

== Match details ==
2 July 1972
17:30 EET

Rapid București	2–0	Jiul Petroșani
Marin 3'; Neagu 27'	Report

23 August, Bucharest
Attendance: 30,000
Referee: Gheorghe Limona (Bucharest)

GK	1	(Romania) Răducanu Necula
DF	2	(Romania) Ion Pop
DF	3	(Romania) Nicolae Lupescu
DF	4	(Romania) Alexandru Boc
DF	5	(Romania) Ion Gheorghe Codrea
MF	6	(Romania) Iordan Angelescu
MF	7	(Romania) Ion Dumitru
FW	8	(Romania) Constantin Năsturescu
FW	9	(Romania) Stelian Marin
FW	10	(Romania) Alexandru Neagu
FW	11	(Romania) Teofil Codreanu (substituted off) 66'
Substitutions:
FW	12	(Romania) Marian Petreanu (substituted in) 66'
Manager:
(Romania) Bazil Marian

GK	1	(Romania) Vasile Suciu
DF	2	(Romania) Alexandru Georgescu
DF	3	(Romania) Nicolae Georgevici
DF	4	(Romania) Andrei Stocker
DF	5	(Romania) Gogu Tonca
MF	6	(Romania) Adrian Dodu
MF	7	(Romania) Gheorghe Kotormani
FW	8	(Romania) Dumitru Urmeș (substituted off) 49'
FW	9	(Romania) Gheorghe Mulțescu
FW	10	(Romania) Petre Libardi
FW	11	(Romania) Cristian Făgaș
Substitutions:
FW	12	(Romania) Dumitru Constantin Stoian (substituted in) 49'
Manager:
(Romania) Eugen Iordache

== See also ==
- List of Cupa României finals
