= Pamfil =

Pamfil is a Romanian given name and surname. Notable people with the name include:

- Pamfil Polonic (1858–1943), Romanian archaeologist and topographer
- Pamfil Yurkevich (1826–1874), Ukrainian philosopher
- Radu Pamfil (1951–2009), Romanian football player
- Doru Pamfil (21 February 1953 - ), Romanian Professeur at University of Agricultural Sciences and Veterinary Medicine of Cluj-Napoca. Rector at University of Agricultural Sciences and Veterinary Medicine of Cluj-Napoca (2008-2016), Full Member at Academia Română from 2015, President at Academia Română Filiala Cluj-Napoca (2020-present)
