= 1982 Cupa României final =

- Event: 1981–82 Cupa României
Dinamo București	FC Baia Mare
3	2
- Date: 20 June 1982
- Venue: 23 August, Bucharest
- Referee: Sever Drăgulici (Drobeta-Turnu Severin)
- Attendance: 15,000

The 1982 Cupa României final was the 44th final of Romania's most prestigious football cup competition. It was disputed between Dinamo București and FC Baia Mare, and was won by Dinamo București after a game with 5 goals. It was the forth cup for Dinamo București.

FC Baia Mare became the 12th team representing Divizia B that reached the Romanian Cup final.

== Route to the final ==
Dinamo București

Round of 32	Cimentul Medgidia	1–4	Dinamo București
Round of 16	Dinamo București	1–0	FC Constanţa
Quarter-finals	Corvinul Hunedoara	3–4	Dinamo București
Semi-finals	Gloria Bistrița	0–1	Dinamo București

FC Baia Mare

Round of 32	FC Baia Mare	2–0	Sportul Studenţesc București
Round of 16	Universitatea Cluj	0–1 (a.e.t.)	FC Baia Mare
Quarter-finals	Chimia Râmnicu Vâlcea	1–2	FC Baia Mare
Semi-finals	FC Baia Mare	1–1 (a.e.t.)(5–3 p)	Argeş Piteşti

== Match details ==
20 June 1982
17:00 EET

Dinamo București	3–2	FC Baia Mare
Iordache 43'; Georgescu 58', 63'	Report	Dragomirescu 48'; Koller 83' (pen.)

23 August, Bucharest
Attendance: 15,000
Referee: Sever Drăgulici (Drobeta-Turnu Severin)

GK	(Romania) Dumitru Moraru
DF	(Romania) Ion Marin
DF	(Romania) Cornel Dinu
DF	(Romania) Adrian Bumbescu
DF	(Romania) Teofil Stredie
MF	(Romania) Gheorghe Mulțescu
MF	(Romania) Pompiliu Iordache
MF	(Romania) Alexandru Custov
FW	(Romania) Florea Văetuș
FW	(Romania) Dudu Georgescu
FW	(Romania) Costel Orac
Manager:
(Romania) Valentin Stănescu

GK	(Romania) Vasile Moldovan
DF	(Romania) Imre Szepi
DF	(Romania) Miron Borz
DF	(Romania) Ioan Tătăran
DF	(Romania) Alexandru Koller
MF	(Romania) Cristian Ene
MF	(Romania) Radu Pamfil
MF	(Romania) Marin Sabău
FW	(Romania) Constantin Dragomirescu
FW	(Romania) Viorel Buzgău (substituted off) 65'
FW	(Romania) Adalbert Rozsnyai
Substitutes:
FW	(Romania) Vasile Caciureac (substituted in) 65'
Manager:
(Romania) Paul Popescu

== See also ==
- List of Cupa României finals
