= Alexandru Neagu =

Romanian footballer

Sandu Neagu
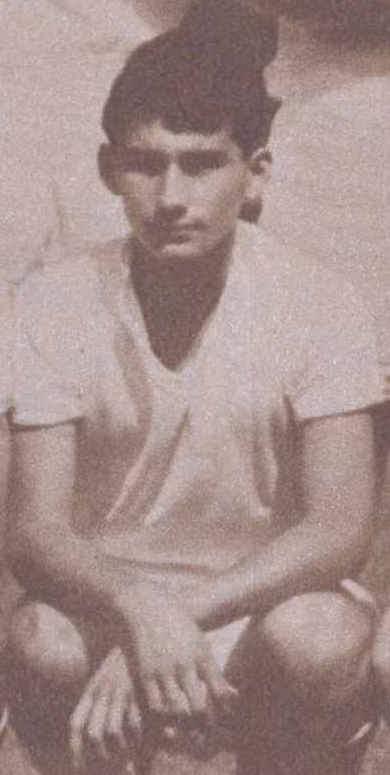
- Neagu in 1965

Personal information
- Full name: Alexandru Neagu
- Date of birth: 19 July 1948
- Place of birth: Bucharest, Romania
- Date of death: 17 April 2010 (aged 61)
- Place of death: Bucharest, Romania
- Height: 1.76 m (5 ft 9 in)
- Position: Striker

Youth career
- 1963–1965: Rapid București

Senior career*
Years	Team	Apps	(Gls)
1965–1978	Rapid București (Note: The statistics for the 1977–78 Divizia B season are unavailable.)	286	(110)

International career
1970–1972	Romania (Note: Including 2 appearances for Romania's Olympic team.)	17	(4)
- * Club domestic league appearances and goals

Alexandru "Sandu" Neagu (19 July 1948 – 17 April 2010) was a Romanian footballer who played as a striker.

== Club career ==
Neagu, nicknamed Cappellini from Giulești by journalist Ioan Chirilă, was born on 19 July 1948 in the Rahova neighborhood of Bucharest, but grew up in the Giulești neighborhood. He began playing football for the junior squads of Giulești-based club, Rapid București, making his Divizia A debut under coach Valentin Stănescu on 31 March 1966 in a 1–0 away loss to Petrolul Ploiești. He would go on to spend his entire career at Rapid, with coach Stănescu telling him at one point:"Hey, you will only leave Rapid with your feet first." In the next season he won the 1966–67 title, but Stănescu used him in only eight games in which he scored one goal, as the first options for the offense were Ion Ionescu and Emil Dumitriu.

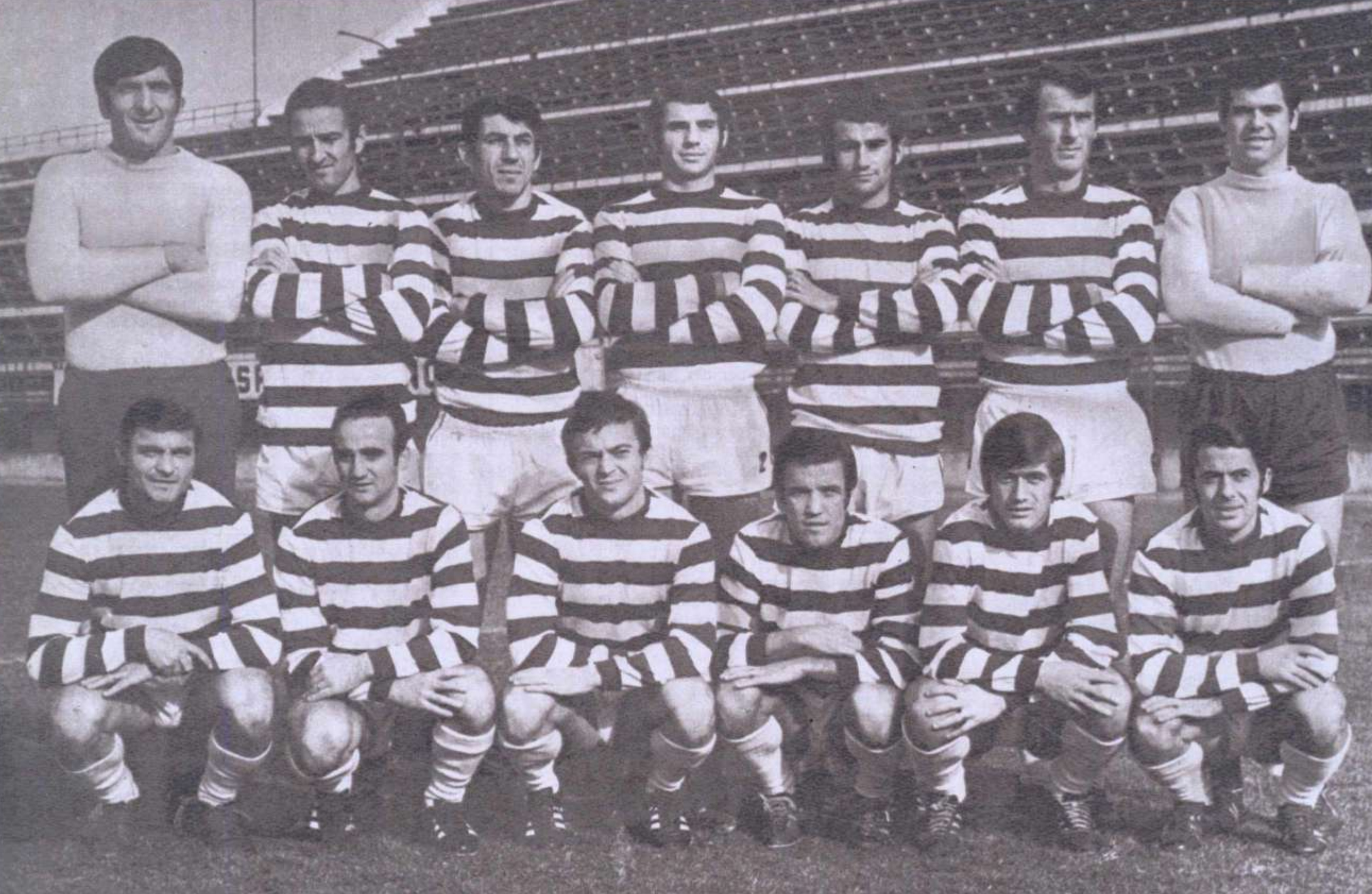
Neagu (back row, third from the right) with Rapid in 1970.

Neagu also won two Cupa României trophies, being used the full 90 minutes by coach Bazil Marian in the 1972 final in which he scored the second goal of the 2–0 victory against Jiul Petroșani. He also played the entire game under coach Ion Motroc in the 2–1 win over Universitatea Craiova in the 1975 final. Neagu played in all six matches in the 1971–72 UEFA Cup campaign, helping the team reach the third round by eliminating Napoli and Legia Warsaw, a run highlighted by his two goals against the latter before Rapid was defeated by eventual winners Tottenham. He also appeared in all six games of the 1972–73 European Cup Winners' Cup to help the team reach the quarter-finals, where they knocked out Landskrona BoIS and Rapid Wien—with Neagu scoring once against the latter—before falling to the eventual finalists, Leeds United. At the end of the 1974–75 Divizia A season, Rapid was relegated to Divizia B, but Neagu stayed with the club, contributing with 17 goals, to help it get promoted back to the first division after one year. Neagu made his last Divizia A appearance on 30 June 1977 in a 2–1 away loss to FC Constanța, totaling 254 games with 93 goals in the competition and 19 matches with five goals in European competitions (including four games and two goals in the Inter-Cities Fairs Cup).

== International career ==
Neagu played 15 games and scored four goals for Romania, all under coach Angelo Niculescu, making his debut on 9 February 1970 in a 1–1 friendly draw against Peru. In his second cap, a 1–1 draw against West Germany, he scored his first international goal. In the 1970 World Cup final tournament, Neagu played in all three games which were a win against Czechoslovakia and losses to England and Brazil, as his side failed to progress from their group. In the 2–1 victory over the Czechoslovaks, he netted a goal and obtained a penalty from which Florea Dumitrache scored the victory goal. He played six matches in the 1972 Euro qualifiers, managing to reach the quarter-finals where he scored two goals, but Romania was defeated by Hungary, who advanced to the final tournament. Neagu's last game played for the national team took place on 20 September 1972 during the 1974 World Cup qualifiers in a 1–1 draw against Finland.

=== International goals ===
Scores and results list Romania's goal tally first, score column indicates score after each Neagu goal.

List of international goals scored by Alexandru Neagu
#	Date	Venue	Cap	Opponent	Score	Result	Competition
1	8 April 1970	Neckarstadion, Stuttgart, West Germany	2	West Germany	1–0	1–1	Friendly
2	6 June 1970	Estadio Jalisco, Guadalajara, Mexico	6	Czechoslovakia	1–1	2–1	1970 World Cup
3	14 May 1972	Stadionul 23 August, Bucharest, Romania	13	Hungary	2–2	2–2	Euro 1972 quarter-finals
4	17 May 1972	Stadion Jugoslovenska Narodna Armija, Belgrade, Yugoslavia	14	Hungary	1–1	1–2	Euro 1972 quarter-finals

== Personal life ==
His son, Roberto, was also a footballer who played briefly for Academica Clinceni in the Romanian first league.

== Death ==
Neagu died on 17 April 2010, at the age of 61 after slipping and falling at Giulești stadium while watching a Rapid training session. He was taken to the hospital, where he later died, with cirrhosis also being a contributing factor.

== Honours ==
Rapid București

- Divizia A: 1966–67
- Divizia B: 1974–75
- Cupa României: 1971–72, 1974–75
