= Doina Ivănescu =

Romanian volleyball player (1935–1996)

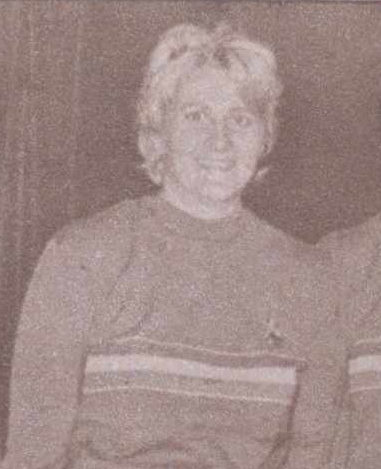

Personal information
- Nationality: Romanian
- Born: January 22, 1935; Blaj, Romania
- Died: 1996 (aged 60–61); Romania

Doina Ivănescu (January 22, 1935 – 1996) was a professional volleyball player in Romania. In 1964, she went to the Olympics and helped Romania capture fourth place. She was born in Blaj, in Alba County, Romania. She was married to Traian Ivănescu a former international footballer and coach.
