= Simion Surdan =

Romanian footballer

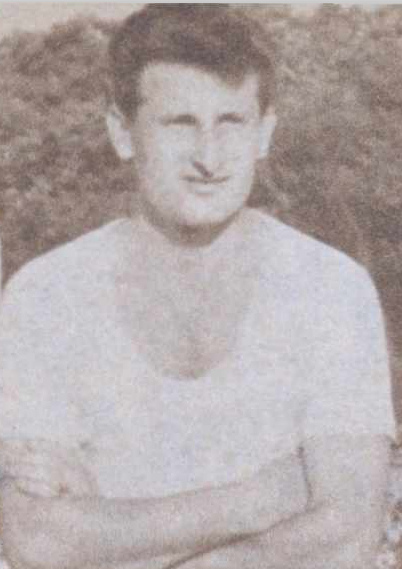

Personal information
- Date of birth: 9 February 1940
- Place of birth: Pustiniș, Uivar, Romania
- Date of death: 10 July 2006 (aged 66)
- Height: 1.75 m (5 ft 9 in)
- Position: Central midfielder

Youth career
- 1956–1957: CFR Timișoara

Senior career*
Years	Team	Apps	(Gls)
1957–1963	CFR Timișoara	102	(25)
1963–1975	Politehnica Timișoara	282	(58)
Total		384	(83)

International career
1963–1966	Romania U23	7	(0)
1966	Romania	1	(0)
- * Club domestic league appearances and goals as of 17 January 2020

Simion Surdan (9 February 1940 – 10 July 2006) was a Romanian footballer who played as a central midfielder for CFR Timișoara and Politehnica Timișoara. While playing for Politehnica he scored one goal in the 1973–74 Cupa României final which was lost with 4–2 to Jiul Petroșani. He also worked as a doctor.

== Club career ==
Surdan was born on 9 February 1940 in the Pustiniș village, part of the Uivar commune in the Timiș County of Romania. He started playing junior-level football in 1956 at CFR Timișoara, one year later starting to play for the senior squad in Divizia B. After six seasons he moved to neighboring club Politehnica where he made his Divizia A debut on 25 August 1963 under coach Nicolae Reuter in a 2–0 home win over Progresul București in which he scored once. The team was relegated at the end of his first season, but Surdan stayed with the club, helping it get promoted back to the first league after one year. In the 1966–67 season he scored 12 goals, but Politehnica was relegated once again. After six years spent in Divizia B, Surdan gained promotion once again with The White-Purples to the top division. Subsequently, they reached the 1974 Cupa României final where coach Ion Ionescu used him the entire match in the 4–2 loss to Jiul Petroșani in which he scored once. Surdan made his last Divizia A appearance on 4 May 1975 in a 2–0 away loss to Argeș Pitești, totaling 124 matches with 22 goals in the competition.

== International career ==
Between 1963 and 1966, Surdan made seven appearances for Romania's under-23 squad.

Surdan played one game for Romania under coach Ilie Oană in a Euro 1968 qualifying match which ended with a 4–2 win against Switzerland.

== Death ==
He died on 10 July 2006 at the age of 66.

== Honours ==
Politehnica Timișoara

- Divizia B: 1964–65, 1972–73
- Cupa României runner-up: 1973–74
