= Radu Pamfil =

Romanian footballer

Personal information
- Full name: Radu Pamfil
- Date of birth: 21 August 1951
- Place of birth: Baia Mare, Romania
- Date of death: 22 March 2009 (aged 57)
- Position: Midfielder

Youth career
- 1959–1967: Minerul Baia Mare

Senior career*
Years	Team	Apps	(Gls)
1967–1973	Minerul Baia Mare		
1973–1974	FC Dinamo Bucureşti		
1974–1982	FC Baia Mare		
- * Club domestic league appearances and goals

Radu Pamfil (21 August 1951, in Baia Mare – 22 March 2009) was a Romanian football player who played for FC Baia Mare and Dinamo Bucureşti.

In 1982, playing for FC Baia Mare, he started in both the European Cup Winners' Cup matches against Real Madrid of Spain.
