= Petre Libardi Stadium =

Romanian stadium

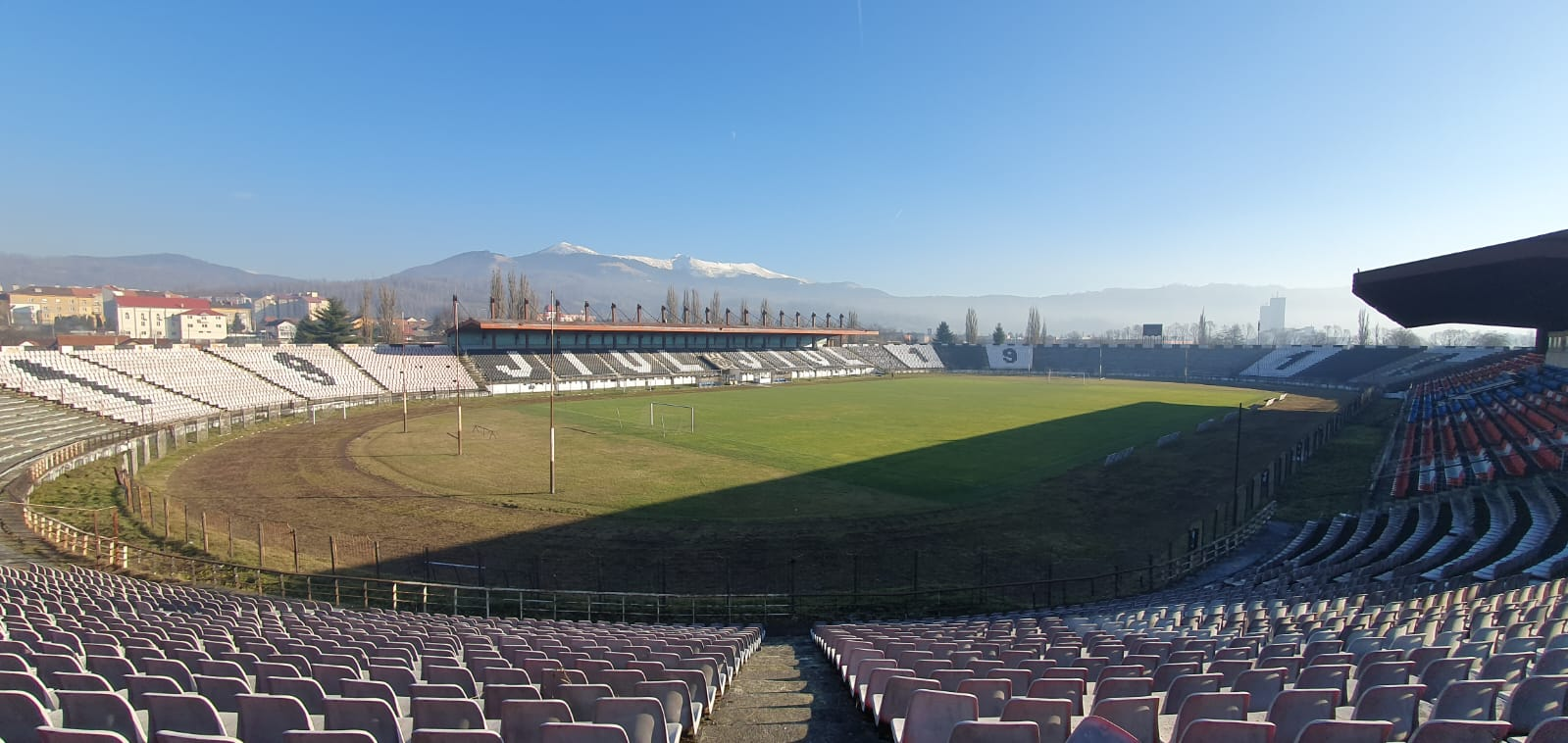
- Interactive map of Petre Libardi Stadium
- Former names: Jiul Stadium (1982–2019)
- Address: Str. Lunca, nr. 100
- Location: Petroșani, Romania
- Coordinates: 45°24′30″N 23°22′03″E
- Owner: Municipality of Petroșani
- Operator: Jiul Petroșani
- Capacity: 15,500 seated
- Surface: Grass
- Field size: 105 x 68 m

Construction
- Opened: 9 August 1982
- Renovated: 2026

Tenant
- Jiul Petroșani (1982–present) Corvinul Hunedoara(2026–present)

The Petre Libardi Stadium is a multi-purpose stadium in Petroșani, Romania. It is currently used mostly for football matches and is the home ground of Jiul Petroșani. The stadium holds 15,500 people and was built in 1982. In 2019 the stadium was renamed "Petre Libardi", in honor of Jiul Petroșani's captain from the successful 1973–1974 Cupa României final.

In 2026, the stadium underwent various upgrades, such as floodlighting, in order to meet Liga I criteria and host matches of newly promoted Corvinul Hunedoara.

Stadium in October 2026 after upgrades
