= 1974–75 European Cup Winners' Cup =

Final positions
- Champions: (Soviet Union) Dynamo Kyiv (1st title)
- Runners-up: (Hungary) Ferencváros

The 1974–75 season of the European Cup Winners' Cup club football tournament was won by Dynamo Kyiv in a convincing final victory against Ferencváros. It was the first of two Cup Winners' Cup successes for the club.

== First round ==
Team 1	Agg.	Team 2	1st leg	2nd leg
Dundee United (Scotland)	3–2	(Romania) Jiul Petroşani	3–0 (Report) (Report 2)	0–2 (Report) (Report 2)
Bursaspor (Turkey)	4–2	(Republic of Ireland) Finn Harps	4–2 (Report) (Report 2)	0–0 (Report) (Report 2)
Eintracht Frankfurt (West Germany)	5–2	(France) Monaco	3–0 (Report) (Report 2)	2–2 (Report) (Report 2)
Dynamo Kyiv (Soviet Union)	2–0	(Bulgaria) CSKA Sofia	1–0 (Report) (Report 2)	1–0 (Report) (Report 2)
Gwardia Warszawa (Poland)	3–3 (5-3p)	(Italy) Bologna	2–1 (Report) (Report 2)	1–2 (Report) (Report 2)
PSV Eindhoven (Netherlands)	14–1	(Northern Ireland) Ards	10–0 (Report) (Report 2)	4–1 (Report) (Report 2)
Slavia Praha (Czechoslovakia)	1–1 (2-3p)	(East Germany) FC Carl Zeiss Jena	1–0 (Report) (Report 2)	0–1 (Report) (Report 2)
Benfica (Portugal)	8–1	(Denmark) Vanløse	4–0 (Report) (Report 2)	4–1 (Report) (Report 2)
Malmö FF (Sweden)	1–1 (5-4p)	(Switzerland) Sion	1–0 (Report) (Report 2)	0–1 (Report) (Report 2)
Sliema Wanderers (Malta)	3–4	(Finland) Reipas Lahti	2–0 (Report) (Report 2)	1–4 (Report) (Report 2)
Liverpool (England)	12–0	(Norway) Strømsgodset	11–0 (Report) (Report 2)	1–0 (Report) (Report 2)
Ferencváros (Hungary)	6–1	(Wales) Cardiff City	2–0 (Report) (Report 2)	4–1 (Report) (Report 2)
Fram (Iceland)	0–8	(Spain) Real Madrid	0–2 (Report) (Report 2)	0–6 (Report) (Report 2)
Waregem (Belgium)	3–5	Austria Wien	2–1 (Report) (Report 2)	1–4 (Report) (Report 2)
Avenir Beggen (Luxembourg)	Walkover	(Cyprus) Enosis Neon Paralimni	–	–
PAOK (Greece)	1–2	(Socialist Federal Republic of Yugoslavia) Red Star Belgrade	1–0 (Report) (Report 2)	0–2(aet)(Report) (Report 2)

Enosis Neon Paralimni withdrew due to the political situation in Cyprus (see Cyprus problem).

=== First leg ===
18 September 1974

Dundee United (Scotland)	3–0	(Romania) Jiul Petroșani
Narey 34'; Copland 37'; Gardner 70'	Report

Tannadice Park, Dundee
Attendance: 7,787
Referee: Theo Boosten (Netherlands)

18 September 1974
19:00

Dynamo Kyiv (Soviet Union)	1–0	(Bulgaria) CSKA Sofia
Blokhin 57'	Report

Central Stadium, Kyiv
Attendance: 75,000
Referee: Orhan Cebe (Turkey)

18 September 1974

Gwardia Warszawa (Poland)	2–1	(Italy) Bologna
Sroka 48' (pen.); Kraska 80'		Savoldi 42'

Warsaw

18 September 1974

Benfica (Portugal)	4–0	(Denmark) Vanløse
Humberto Coelho 26'; Nené 43'; Rui Jordão 65', 89'

Estádio da Luz, Lisbon
Attendance: 40,000
Referee: Pablo Sánchez Ibáñez (Spain)

18 September 1974

PAOK (Greece)	1–0	(Socialist Federal Republic of Yugoslavia) Red Star Belgrade
Terzanidis 67'

Toumba Stadium, Thessaloniki
Attendance: 39,167
Referee: Domenico Serafino (Italy)

=== Second leg ===
2 October 1974

Jiul Petroșani (Romania)	2–0	(Scotland) Dundee United
Rozsnyai 15'; Tonca 36'	Report

Stadionul Jiul, Petroșani
Attendance: 15,000
Referee: Nikolas Zlatanos (Greece)

Dundee United won 3–2 on aggregate.

2 October 1974
19:00

CSKA Sofia (Bulgaria)	0–1	(Soviet Union) Dynamo Kyiv
	Report	Blokhin 81'

Vasil Levski National Stadium, Sofia
Attendance: 35,000
Referee: Günter Männig (East Germany)

Dynamo Kyiv won 2–0 on aggregate.

2 October 1974

Bologna (Italy)	2–1	(Poland) Gwardia Warszawa
Savoldi 16' 43'		Terlecki 25'
Penalties
Landini (penalty scored); Savoldi (penalty scored); Ghetti (penalty scored); Massimelli (penalty missed)	3–5	(penalty scored) Małkiewicz; (penalty scored) Dawidczyński; (penalty scored) Śledziewski; (penalty scored) Michalik; (penalty scored) Polakow

Bologna

Bologna 3–3 Gwardia Warszawa on aggregate. Gwardia Warszawa won 5–3 on penalties.

2 October 1974

Vanløse (Denmark)	1–4	(Portugal) Benfica
Petersen 15'		Nené 27'; Rui Jordão 29', 43'; Barros 86'

Vanløse Idrætspark, Copenhagen
Attendance: 3,100
Referee: Eric Smyton (Northern Ireland)

Benfica won 8–1 on aggregate.

2 October 1974

Red Star Belgrade (Socialist Federal Republic of Yugoslavia)	2–0 (a.e.t.)	(Greece) PAOK
V. Petrović 58'; Savić 103'

Red Star Stadium, Belgrade
Attendance: 50,000
Referee: Anton Bucheli (Switzerland)

Red Star Belgrade won 2–1 on aggregate.

== Second round ==
Team 1	Agg.	Team 2	1st leg	2nd leg
Dundee United (Scotland)	0–1	(Turkey) Bursaspor	0–0 (Report) (Report 2)	0–1 (Report) (Report 2)
Eintracht Frankfurt (West Germany)	3–5	(Soviet Union) Dynamo Kyiv	2–3 (Report) (Report 2)	1–2 (Report) (Report 2)
Gwardia Warszawa (Poland)	1–8	(Netherlands) PSV Eindhoven	1–5 (Report) (Report 2)	0–3 (Report) (Report 2)
Carl Zeiss Jena (East Germany)	1–1 (a)	(Portugal) Benfica	1–1 (Report) (Report 2)	0–0 (Report) (Report 2)
Malmö FF (Sweden)	3–1	(Finland) Reipas Lahti	3–1 (Report) (Report 2)	0–0 (Report) (Report 2)
Liverpool (England)	1–1 (a)	(Hungary) Ferencváros	1–1 (Report) (Report 2)	0–0 (Report) (Report 2)
Real Madrid (Spain)	5–2	Austria Wien	3–0 (Report) (Report 2)	2–2 (Report) (Report 2)
Avenir Beggen (Luxembourg)	2–11	(Socialist Federal Republic of Yugoslavia) Red Star Belgrade	1–6 (Report) (Report 2)	1–5 (Report) (Report 2)

=== First leg ===
23 October 1974
20:00

Eintracht Frankfurt (West Germany)	2–3	(Soviet Union) Dynamo Kyiv
Nickel 2'; Körbel 64' (pen.)	Report	Onyshchenko 32'; Blokhin 83'; Muntyan 87'

Waldstadion, Frankfurt
Attendance: 25,000
Referee: César Correia Diaz da Luz (Portugal)

23 October 1974

Carl Zeiss Jena (East Germany)	1–1	(Portugal) Benfica
Vogel 76'		Nené 20'

Ernst-Abbe-Sportfeld, Jena
Attendance: 13,049
Referee: Walter Hungerbühler (Switzerland)

22 October 1974

Avenir Beggen (Luxembourg)	1–6	(Socialist Federal Republic of Yugoslavia) Red Star Belgrade
Sinner 76'		Šestić 1', 29', 73'; Filipović 3', 56'; Ratković 62'

Stade Municipal, Luxembourg
Attendance: 1,376
Referee: Robert Wurtz (France)

=== Second leg ===
5 November 1974
19:00

Dynamo Kyiv (Soviet Union)	2–1	(West Germany) Eintracht Frankfurt
Onyshchenko 1', 39'	Report	Rohrbach 47'

Central Stadium, Kyiv
Attendance: 60,000
Referee: Martti Hirviniemi (Finland)

Dynamo Kyiv won 5–3 on aggregate.

6 November 1974

Benfica (Portugal)	0–0	(East Germany) Carl Zeiss Jena

Estádio da Luz, Lisbon
Attendance: 40,348
Referee: Pat Partridge (England)

1–1 on aggregate. Benfica won on away goals.

6 November 1974

Red Star Belgrade (Socialist Federal Republic of Yugoslavia)	5–1	(Luxembourg) Avenir Beggen
Filipović 1'; Ratković 7', 58'; Šestić 25'; Savić 65'		Dresch 86'

Red Star Stadium, Belgrade
Attendance: 4,000
Referee: Paul Bonett (Malta)

Red Star Belgrade won 11–2 on aggregate.

== Quarter-finals ==
Team 1	Agg.	Team 2	1st leg	2nd leg
Bursaspor (Turkey)	0–3	(Soviet Union) Dynamo Kyiv	0–1 (Report) (Report 2)	0–2 (Report) (Report 2)
PSV Eindhoven (Netherlands)	2–1	(Portugal) Benfica	0–0 (Report) (Report 2)	2–1 (Report) (Report 2)
Malmö FF (Sweden)	2–4	(Hungary) Ferencváros	1–3 (Report) (Report 2)	1–1 (Report) (Report 2)
Real Madrid (Spain)	2–2 (5-6p)	(Socialist Federal Republic of Yugoslavia) Red Star Belgrade	2–0 (Report) (Report 2)	0–2 (Report) (Report 2)

=== First leg ===
5 March 1975
14:30

Bursaspor (Turkey)	0–1	(Soviet Union) Dynamo Kyiv
	Report	Onyshchenko 21'

Bursa Atatürk Stadium, Bursa
Attendance: 30,000
Referee: Tsvetan Stanev (Bulgaria)

4 March 1975

PSV Eindhoven (Netherlands)	0–0	(Portugal) Benfica

Philips Stadion, Eindhoven
Attendance: 26,000
Referee: Alberto Michelotti (Italy)

5 March 1975

Real Madrid (Spain)	2–0	(Socialist Federal Republic of Yugoslavia) Red Star Belgrade
Santillana 34'; Netzer 65'

Santiago Bernabéu, Madrid
Attendance: 100,000
Referee: Michel Kitabdjian (France)

=== Second leg ===
19 March 1975
19:00

Dynamo Kyiv (Soviet Union)	2–0	(Turkey) Bursaspor
Kolotov 72' (pen.); Muntyan 87'	Report

Central Stadium, Kyiv
Attendance: 95,000
Referee: Kurt Tschenscher (West Germany)

Dynamo Kyiv won 3–0 on aggregate.

19 March 1975

Benfica (Portugal)	1–2	(Netherlands) PSV Eindhoven
Humberto Coelho 17'		W. van de Kerkhof 11'; Van der Kuijlen 85'

Estádio da Luz, Lisbon
Attendance: 70,000
Referee: John Paterson (Scotland)

PSV Eindhoven won 2–1 on aggregate.

19 March 1975

Red Star Belgrade (Socialist Federal Republic of Yugoslavia)	2–0 (a.e.t.)	(Spain) Real Madrid
Džajić 35'; O. Petrović 55' (pen.)
Penalties
Keri (penalty scored); Filipović (penalty scored); Baralić (penalty scored); Savić (penalty scored); O. Petrović (penalty scored); Đorđević (penalty missed); V. Petrović (penalty scored)	6–5	(penalty scored) del Bosque; (penalty scored) Netzer; (penalty scored) Aguilar; (penalty scored) Breitner; (penalty scored) Rubiñán; (penalty missed) Goyo; (penalty missed) Santillana

Red Star Stadium, Belgrade
Attendance: 100,000
Referee: Ken Burns (England)

Red Star Belgrade 2–2 Real Madrid on aggregate. Red Star Belgrade won 6–5 on penalties.

== Semi-finals ==
Team 1	Agg.	Team 2	1st leg	2nd leg
Dynamo Kyiv (Soviet Union)	4–2	(Netherlands) PSV Eindhoven	3–0 (Report) (Report 2)	1–2 (Report) (Report 2)
Ferencváros (Hungary)	4–3	(Socialist Federal Republic of Yugoslavia) Red Star Belgrade	2–1 (Report) (Report 2)	2–2 (Report) (Report 2)

=== First leg ===
9 April 1975
19:00

Dynamo Kyiv (Soviet Union)	3–0	(Netherlands) PSV Eindhoven
Kolotov 17'; Onyshchenko 31'; Blokhin 56'	Report

Central Stadium, Kyiv
Attendance: 100,000
Referee: Pat Partridge (England)

9 April 1975

Ferencváros (Hungary)	2–1	(Socialist Federal Republic of Yugoslavia) Red Star Belgrade
Branikovits 44'; Magyar 77'		Savić 56'

Népstadion, Budapest
Attendance: 55,000
Referee: Nicolae Rainea (Romania)

=== Second leg ===
23 April 1975
20:00

PSV Eindhoven (Netherlands)	2–1	(Soviet Union) Dynamo Kyiv
Edström 22', 85'	Report	Buryak 77'

Philips Stadion, Eindhoven
Attendance: 24,000
Referee: Pablo Sánchez Ibáñez (Spain)

Dynamo Kyiv won 4–2 on aggregate.

23 April 1975

Red Star Belgrade (Socialist Federal Republic of Yugoslavia)	2–2	(Hungary) Ferencváros
Keri 50'; Filipović 77'		Pusztai 7'; Megyesi 83' (pen.)

Red Star Stadium, Belgrade
Attendance: 110,000
Referee: Walter Eschweiler (West Germany)

Ferencváros won 4–3 on aggregate.

== Final ==
14 May 1975
20:15

Dynamo Kyiv (Soviet Union)	3–0	(Hungary) Ferencváros
Onyshchenko 18', 39'; Blokhin 67'	Report

St. Jakob Stadium, Basel
Attendance: 13,000
Referee: Robert Davidson (Scotland)

== See also ==
- 1974–75 European Cup
- 1974–75 UEFA Cup
