= Eugen Iordache =

Romanian footballer

Personal information
- Date of birth: 30 April 1922
- Place of birth: Bucharest, Romania
- Date of death: 22 February 1988 (aged 65)
- Position: Striker

Youth career
- 1947–1948: Gloria București

Senior career*
Years	Team	Apps	(Gls)
1942–1952	Flacăra Ploiești	126	(48)
1953	Locomotiva București	18	(3)
1954	Progresul București		
1954	Progresul Oradea	5	(0)
1955	Progresul București	11	(0)
Total		160	(51)

International career
1946–1953	Romania	12	(1)

Managerial career
- 1970–1971: CFR Cluj
- 1971–1972: Jiul Petroșani
- 1980: Progresul București
- * Club domestic league appearances and goals

Eugen Iordache (30 April 1922 – 22 February 1988) was a Romanian footballer and manager. He competed in the men's tournament at the 1952 Summer Olympics.

== Honours ==
=== Player ===
Progresul București

- Divizia B: 1954

=== Coach ===
Jiul Petroșani

- Cupa României Runner-up: 1971–72
