= Ștefan Coidum =

Romanian football player

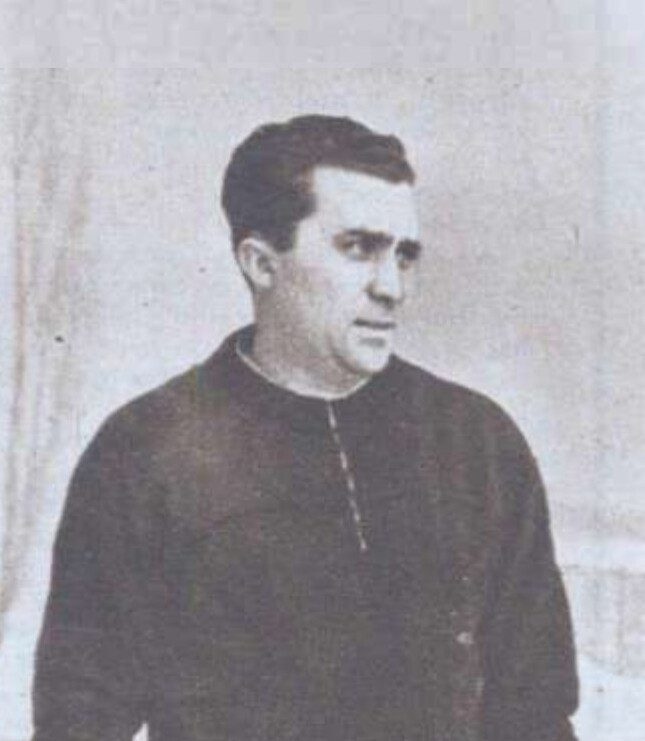

Personal information
- Date of birth: 28 December 1930
- Place of birth: Bucharest, Romania
- Date of death: 27 February 2015 (aged 84)
- Place of death: Bucharest, Romania
- Position: Midfielder

Youth career
- Unirea Tricolor București

Senior career*
Years	Team	Apps	(Gls)
1950–1952	Partizanul Petroșani	3	(0)
1952–1954	Dinamo Bacău		
1954–1957	Minerul Petroșani	57	(3)
1957–1959	Farul Constanța	5	(0)
1959–1960	Prahova Ploiești		
Total		65	(3)

Managerial career
- 1963–1964: Ceahlăul Piatra Neamț
- 1964–1966: CSM Reșița
- 1966–1968: Jiul Petroșani
- 1968–1971: Universitatea Craiova
- 1971: Crișul Oradea
- 1972–1973: Jiul Petroșani
- 1973–1974: Argeș Pitești
- 1974–1975: FC Galați
- 1975–1977: Electroputere Craiova
- 1977–1978: Corvinul Hunedoara
- 1978–1979: Șoimii Sibiu
- 1979–1981: CS Târgoviște
- 1981–1982: Metalul București
- 1982–1985: Brașov
- 1986–1987: ASA Târgu Mureș
- 1987–1988: Bihor Oradea
- 1989: Rapid București
- 1989–1990: Carpați Mârșa
- 1990–1991: ASA Târgu Mureș
- 1991–1992: Inter Sibiu
- 1992: Bihor Oradea
- 1992–1994: Maramureș Baia Mare
- 1994–1995: Bihor Oradea
- 1998–1999: Chimica Târnăveni
- * Club domestic league appearances and goals as of 12 January 2017

Ștefan Coidum (28 December 1930 – 27 February 2015) was a Romanian professional footballer and manager. Even if he did not have a lengthy playing career, playing only 10 seasons total, and just over 60 Divizia A matches, Coidum impressed much more as a football manager. In his 35-year career, during which he trained 18 different teams, Ștefan Coidum earned a reputation as an expert of promotions, achieving no fewer than 6 promotions to the first league with: CS Târgoviște, Brașov, ASA Târgu Mureș (2), Bihor Oradea and Maramureș Baia Mare. He also led Universitatea Craiova and Argeș Pitești in the European Cups.

== Honours ==
CS Târgoviște

- Divizia B (1): 1980–81

Brașov

- Divizia B (1): 1983–84

ASA Târgu Mureș

- Divizia B (2): 1986–87, 1990–91

Bihor Oradea

- Divizia B (1): 1987–88

Maramureș Baia Mare

- Divizia B (1): 1993–94
