= Traian Ivănescu =

Romanian footballer and manager (1933–2019)

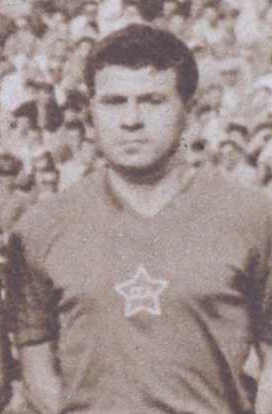

Personal information
- Date of birth: 5 May 1933
- Place of birth: Bucharest, Romania
- Date of death: 29 July 2019 (aged 86)
- Position: Defender

Youth career
- 1946–1950: Militari București
- 1950: Flamura Roşie București

Senior career*
| Years | Team | Apps | (Gls) |
| 1951 | Flacăra București | 15 | (2) |
| 1952–1963 | Steaua București | 155 | (2) |
| 1963–1965 | Progresul București | 23 | (0) |
| 1965 | Siderurgistul Galați | | |
| 1965–1966 | Jiul Petroșani | 23 | (0) |
| Total | | 216 | (4) |

International career
| 1954 | Romania | 1 | (0) |

Managerial career
- 1967–1973: Dinamo București (youth)
- 1973–1974: Jiul Petroșani
- 1975–1976: Mureșul Deva
- 1976–1977: Steagul Roșu Brașov
- 1977–1982: Maramureș Baia Mare
- 1982–1983: Metalosport Galați
- 1983–1984: Tehnometal București
- 1985–1986: Flacăra Moreni
- * Club domestic league appearances and goals

Traian Ivănescu (5 May 1933 – 29 July 2019) was a Romanian football player and manager.

== Career ==
Born in Bucharest, Ivănescu played youth football with Militari București and Flamura Roşie București, before making his senior debut in 1951 with Flacăra București. He later played for CCA Steaua București, Progresul București, Siderurgistul Galați and Jiul Petroşani, before retiring in 1966. He was married to Doina Ivănescu a former volleyball player who represented her country at the 1964 Summer Olympics.

He also earned one cap for Romania in 1954.

Ivănescu later became a coach.

He died on 29 July 2019, aged 86.

== Honours ==
=== Player ===
Steaua București

- Divizia A (5): 1952, 1953, 1956, 1959–60, 1960–61
- Cupa României (3): 1952, 1955, 1961–62

Siderurgistul Galați

- Romanian Second Division: 1964–65

Jiul Petroșani

- Romanian Second Division: 1965–66

Romania

- World University Games: 1954

=== Manager ===
Jiul Petroșani

- Cupa României: 1973–74

Flacăra Moreni

- Romanian Second Division: 1985–86
