= 1973–74 Cupa României =

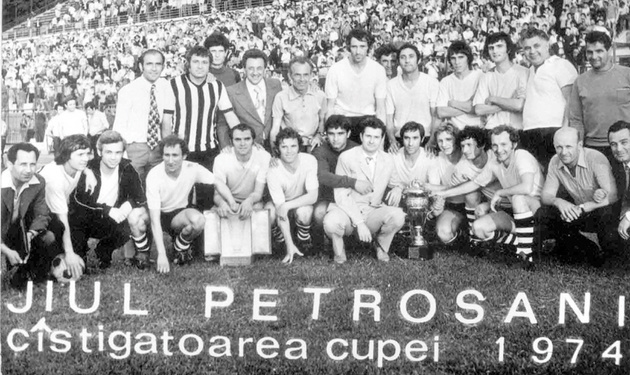
- Jiul Petroșani, the winning team of the 1973–74 Cupa României

Tournament details
- Country: Romania

Final positions
- Champions: Jiul Petroşani
- Runners-up: Politehnica Timişoara

The 1973–74 Cupa României was the 36th edition of Romania's most prestigious football cup competition.

The title was won by Jiul Petroşani against Politehnica Timişoara.

== Format ==
The competition is an annual knockout tournament.

Each tie is played as a single leg on neutral ground.

If a match is drawn after 90 minutes, the game goes in extra time, and if the scored is still tight after 120 minutes, then the winner will be established at penalty kicks.

From the first edition, the teams from Divizia A entered in competition in sixteen finals, rule which remained till today.

== Bracket ==
Round of 32
Jiul Petroşani	2
Partizanul Bacău	1
Petrolul Ploieşti	2
CFR Paşcani	0
Gloria Buzău	1
ASA 1962 Târgu Mureș	2
Minerul Baia Mare	1
Gloria Bistriţa	0
Rapid București	0 (3)
Chimia Rm. Vâlcea (p)	0 (4)
Argeş Piteşti	4
CFR Cluj	2
Universitatea Cluj	6
Stăruinţa Aleşd	0
Oltul Sfântu Gheorghe	1
Ştiinţa Petroşani	0
Politehnica Timişoara	3
FC Constanţa	2
CSM Reșița	2
Politehnica Iaşi	1
Tulcea (a.e.t.)	2
Electroputere Craiova	0
ȘN Oltenița	1
Dinamo București	0
Steaua București	3
Poiana Câmpina	0
SC Bacău (p)	2 (3)
Steagul Roşu Braşov	2 (2)
UTA Arad	1
Universitatea Craiova	0
Sportul Studenţesc	5
Dacia Orăştie	0

Round of 16
Jiul Petroşani	4
Petrolul Ploieşti	2
ASA Tg. Mureș (a.e.t.)	2
Minerul Baia Mare	1
Chimia Râmnicu Vâlcea	1
Argeş Piteşti	0
Universitatea Cluj	1
Oltul Sfântu Gheorghe	0
Politehnica Timişoara	3
CSM Reșița	1
Tulcea	3
ȘN Oltenița	0
Steaua București	3
SC Bacău	1
UTA Arad	2
Sportul Studenţesc	1

Quarter-finals
Jiul Petroşani	1
ASA 1962 Târgu Mureș	0
Chimia Rm. Vâlcea (p)	0 (5)
Universitatea Cluj	0 (4)
Politehnica Timişoara	1
Tulcea	0
Steaua București	3
UTA Arad	1

Semi-finals
Jiul Petroşani	1
Chimia Râmnicu Vâlcea	0
Politehnica Timişoara	3
Steaua București	1

Final
Jiul Petroşani	4
Politehnica Timişoara	2

== First round proper ==
Team 1	Score	Team 2
21 November 1973
CSM Reșița (Div. A)	2–1	(Div. A) Politehnica Iaşi
UTA Arad (Div. A)	1–0	(Div. A) Universitatea Craiova
Gloria Buzău (Div. B)	1–2	(Div. A) ASA 1962 Târgu Mureș
Tulcea (Div. B)	2–0 (a.e.t.)	(Div. B) Electroputere Craiova
Minerul Baia Mare (Div. B)	1–0	(Div. B) Gloria Bistriţa
Rapid București (Div. A)	0–0 (a.e.t.) (3–4 p)	(Div. B) Chimia Râmnicu Vâlcea
ȘN Oltenița (Div. B)	1–0	(Div. A) Dinamo București
Sportul Studenţesc București (Div. A)	5–0	(Div. C) Dacia Orăştie
Universitatea Cluj (Div. A)	6–0	(Div. D) Stăruinţa Aleşd
SC Bacău (Div. A)	2–2 (a.e.t.) (3–2 p)	(Div. A) Steagul Roşu Braşov
Argeş Piteşti (Div. A)	4–2	(Div. A) CFR Cluj
Petrolul Ploieşti (Div. A)	2–0	(Div. B) CFR Paşcani
Politehnica Timişoara (Div. A)	3–2	(Div. A) FC Constanţa
Jiul Petroşani (Div. A)	2–1	(Div. D) Partizanul Bacău
Oltul Sfântu Gheorghe (Div. C)	1–0	(Div. C) Ştiinţa Petroşani
Steaua București (Div. A)	3–0	(Div. C) Poiana Câmpina

== Second round proper ==
Team 1	Score	Team 2
5 December 1973
Chimia Râmnicu Vâlcea	1–0	Argeş Piteşti
Jiul Petroşani	4–2	Petrolul Ploieşti
Politehnica Timişoara	3–1	CSM Reșița
Tulcea	3–0	ȘN Oltenița
Steaua București	3–1	SC Bacău
Universitatea Cluj	1–0	Oltul Sfântu Gheorghe
ASA 1962 Târgu Mureș	2–1 (a.e.t.)	Minerul Baia Mare
UTA Arad	2–1	Sportul Studenţesc București

== Quarter-finals ==
Team 1	Score	Team 2
15 May 1974
Jiul Petroşani	1–0	ASA 1962 Târgu Mureș
Politehnica Timişoara	1–0	Tulcea
Chimia Râmnicu Vâlcea	0–0 (a.e.t.) (5–4 p)	Universitatea Cluj
Steaua București	3–1	UTA Arad

== Semi-finals ==
Team 1	Score	Team 2
22 May 1974
Jiul Petroşani	1–0	Chimia Râmnicu Vâlcea
Politehnica Timişoara	3–1	Steaua București

== Final ==
23 June 1974
17:30 EET

Jiul Petroşani	4–2	Politehnica Timișoara
Mulțescu 32', 47'; Rozsnyai 34'; Suciu 77'	Report	Surdan 36'; Bungău 86'

Republicii, Bucharest
Attendance: 12,000
Referee: Victor Pădureanu (Bucharest)

Cupa României 1973–74 winners

1st title
