= Bazil Marian =

Romanian footballer and manager

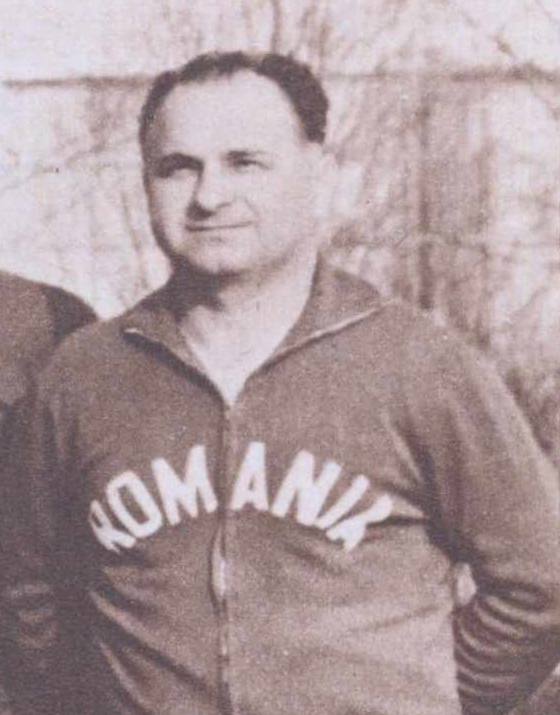

Personal information
- Date of birth: 7 November 1922
- Place of birth: Uioara de Sus, Romania
- Date of death: 19 January 2008 (aged 85)
- Place of death: Bucharest, Romania
- Positions: Midfielder; forward

Youth career
- 1934–1938: Solvay Uioara

Senior career*
Years	Team	Apps	(Gls)
1938–1940	Victoria Cluj	14	(2)
1940–1941	Mica Brad	22	(5)
1941–1947	Carmen București (Note: The Divizia A 1940–41 was the last season before World War II and the Divizia A 1946–47 was the first one after, so the appearances and goals scored during this period for Carmen București are not official with the exception of the 1945–46 regional championship.)	34	(22)
1947–1954	Locomotiva București (Note: The statistics for the 1952 Divizia B season are unavailable.)	96	(54)
1960–1961	Jiul Petroșani	14	(2)
Total		180	(85)

International career^{‡}
1942–1949	Romania	18	(2)

Managerial career
- 1954–1960: Rapid București (assistant)
- 1961–1962: Jiul Petroșani
- 1962–1963: Viitorul București
- 1963–1967: Romania U-21
- 1967: Romania
- 1967: Dinamo București (assistant)
- 1968–1969: Dinamo București
- 1969: Farul Constanța
- 1970: Argeș Pitești
- 1971–1972: Rapid București
- 1973–1974: Boufarik
- 1974: JS Kabylie
- 1977–1978: Rapid București
- 1979–1989: Romania U-21
- * Club domestic league appearances and goals as of 1 March 2018 ‡ National team caps and goals as of 1 March 2018

Bazil Marian (7 November 1922 – 19 January 2008) was a Romanian professional footballer and coach.

== Club career ==
Marian, nicknamed "Bombardierul" (The Bomber) because of his powerful shots, was born on 7 November 1922 in Uioara de Sus, Romania. He began playing junior-level football at age 11 at local club Solvay. He made his Divizia A debut playing for Victoria Cluj on 24 September 1947 in a 2–1 home victory against Venus București. Victoria was relegated by the end of the season, but he stayed in Divizia A, playing one season for Mica Brad before moving to Carmen București.

At Carmen in December 1946 during a game against Ciocanul București when they were leading 4–0, he ran alone towards the opposite goal, dribbled the goalkeeper, after which he sat down with his bottom on the ball and his hand over his eyes, as if looking for his opponents, before pushing the ball into the net. At the end of the season, following another victory against Ciocanul with 6–0 in which he scored two goals, the Carmen team was dissolved by the Communist regime that just took over the country. He and teammate Valentin Stănescu attempted to flee to Italy by boarding a ship in the Port of Constanța. However, the authorities apprehended them, offering a choice between imprisonment or playing for a working-class team like Locomotiva București, and they both chose the latter option.

At Locomotiva he managed to score 32 goals in 24 appearances in the 1947–48 Divizia A season, but did not win the top-scorer of the league as ITA Arad's Ladislau Bonyhádi scored a record of 49 goals. In 1950 in a game against CFR Timișoara, Marian scored a goal with a powerful shot from 18 meters that broke the net and after the game the opponents goalkeeper, Dumitru Pavlovici said:"I am the happiest that Marian's bomb was a goal. Otherwise, if his kick would have hit me in full, I would have gone straight to the hospital". At the end of the 1951 Divizia A season, Locomotiva was relegated to Divizia B, but Marian stayed with the club, helping it get promoted back to the first league after one season. During a match played in cold weather against Metalul București, he scored a goal that the referee disallowed. He then ran to the fence near the stands, where boiled țuică was sold, and drank a cup before returning to the pitch. Upon scoring another goal, which the referee again cancelled, he drank another cup of țuică. Marian then shook the referee's hand, asked to be replaced, and left the pitch, stating that if he scored another goal and it was cancelled, he'd have to drink another cup and would get drunk. He retired after playing for Locomotiva on 14 November 1954 in a Divizia A match which ended with a 3–2 loss against Progresul Oradea. However, six years later at age 39, Marian came out of retirement after he, as a coach, gained promotion with Jiul Petroșani to the first league because the squad's quality was insufficient for the top-division. He played 14 games in which he scored two goals for The Miners during the 1961–62 Divizia A season.

== International career ==
Marian played 18 games and scored two goals for Romania, making his debut on 1 June 1941 under coach Virgil Economu in a 4–1 friendly loss to Germany. He scored his first goal for the national team in a 2–2 friendly draw against Slovakia. Afterwards he made two appearances in the 1946 Balkan Cup and played four games in which he scored a goal in a 3–2 away win over Bulgaria during the 1947 Balkan Cup. He also made two appearances in the 1948 Balkan Cup. Marian's last appearance for the national team took place on 8 May 1949 in a home friendly that ended with a 2–1 victory against Poland.

=== International goals ===
Scores and results list Romania's goal tally first, score column indicates score after each Marian goal.

Goal	Date	Venue	Opponent	Score	Result	Competition
1	13 June 1943	Stadionul Giulești, București, Romania	Slovakia	1–0	2–2	Friendly
2	6 July 1947	Yunak Stadium, Sofia, Bulgaria	Bulgaria	3–1	3–2	1947 Balkan Cup

== Managerial career ==
Marian started coaching in 1954 at juniors and as an assistant for six years at Rapid București. He started to work as head coach in the 1960–61 Divizia B season at Jiul Petroșani, helping it earn promotion to Divizia A, but the team was relegated after one season. He went on to coach Viitorul București, shortly thereafter moved to Romania's under 21 national team, and in 1967, he coached Romania's senior team for one friendly game that ended in a 1–1 draw against Uruguay in Montevideo at Estadio Gran Parque Central.

Marian was the assistant coach of Traian Ionescu at Dinamo București in the first half of the 1967–68 season, becoming the team's head coach for the second half. He finished the season by winning the Cupa României after a 3–1 victory in the final against Rapid București, which was coached by his former Carmen București teammate Valentin Stănescu. Marian went to have some short spells at Farul Constanța and Argeș Pitești before going to Rapid. There, he won the 1971–72 Cupa României after a 2–0 victory in the final against Jiul Petroșani. At Rapid, he also had his first European performances. They reached the round of 16 in the 1971–72 UEFA Cup campaign after eliminating Napoli—the first Italian team defeated in Romanian football history—before getting past Legia Warsaw and ultimately falling to the eventual tournament winners, Tottenham. In the 1972–73 European Cup Winners' Cup campaign, the team reached the quarter-finals, eliminating Landskrona BoIS and Rapid Wien.

In 1973 he went to coach abroad in Algeria at Boufarik and JS Kabylie, afterwards returning for one season at Rapid București. From 1979 until his retirement at age 67 in 1989 he coached Romania's under 21 national team.

== Death ==
Marian, who suffered from Alzheimer's disease in the last years of his life, died on January 19, 2008, in Bucharest at the age of 85 and was buried in the town's Andronache cemetery.

== Honours ==
=== Player ===
Locomotiva București

- Divizia B: 1952

=== Manager ===
Jiul Petroșani

- Divizia B: 1960–61

Dinamo București

- Cupa României: 1967–68

Rapid București

- Cupa României: 1971–72
