= 1971–72 Cupa României =

Tournament details
- Country: Romania

Final positions
- Champions: Rapid București
- Runners-up: Jiul Petroşani

The 1970–71 Cupa României was the 34th edition of Romania's most prestigious football cup competition.

The title was won by Rapid București against Jiul Petroşani.

== Format ==
The competition is an annual knockout tournament.

In the first round proper, two pots were made, first pot with Divizia A teams and other teams till 16 and the second pot with the rest of teams qualified in this phase. Each tie is played as a single leg.

First round proper matches are played on the ground of the lowest ranked team, then from the second round proper the matches are played on a neutral location.

In the first round proper, if a match is drawn after 90 minutes, the game goes in extra time, and if the scored is still tight after 120 minutes, the team who played away will qualify.

In the second round proper, if a match is drawn after 90 minutes, the game goes in extra time, and if the scored is still tight after 120 minutes, then the team from the lower division will qualify. If the teams are from the same division, the younger team will qualify.

In the semi-finals, if a match is drawn after 90 minutes, the game goes in extra time, and if the scored is still tight after 120 minutes, the winner will be established at penalty kicks.

From the first edition, the teams from Divizia A entered in competition in sixteen finals, rule which remained till today.

== Bracket ==
Round of 32
Unirea Drăgăşani	2
UTA Arad	0
Minaur Zlatna	0
Rapid București (a.e.t.)	0
FC Galaţi	2
Farul Constanța	1
Minerul Baia Mare	0
Universitatea Cluj (a.e.t.)	0
Metalul București	1
Steagul Roşu Braşov	0
Olimpia Râmnicu Sărat	0
Argeș Pitești	3
Olimpia Satu Mare	2
Universitatea Craiova	1
Petrolistul Boldeşti	1
ASA Tg. Mureș (a.e.t.)	2
Textila Odorhei	0
Jiul Petroşani	3
CFR Timișoara	0
SC Bacău	1
Dunărea Calafat	1
Petrolul Ploiești	0
Cimentul Medgidia	0
CFR Cluj	2
Tractorul Brașov	3
Politehnica Iași	0
Petrolul Moineşti	1
Dinamo București	4
Politehnica Timișoara	2
Steaua București	0
Metalul Plopeni	1
ASA Crişul Oradea	2

Round of 16
Unirea Drăgăşani	0
Rapid București	2
FC Galaţi (a.e.t.)	0
Universitatea Cluj	0
Metalul București	3
Argeș Pitești	1
Olimpia Satu Mare	0
ASA 1962 Târgu Mureș	2
Jiul Petroşani	1
SC Bacău	0
Dunărea Calafat	0
CFR Cluj	2
Tractorul Brașov	2
Dinamo București	3
Politehnica Timișoara (a.e.t.)	1
ASA Crişul Oradea	1

Quarter-finals
Rapid București	1
FC Galaţi	0
Metalul București	4
ASA 1962 Târgu Mureș	1
Jiul Petroşani	4
CFR Cluj	1
Dinamo București	2
Politehnica Timișoara	0

Semi-finals
Rapid București	3
Metalul București	2
Jiul Petroşani (p)	2 (7)
Dinamo București	2 (6)

Final
Rapid București	2
Jiul Petroşani	0

== First round proper ==
Team 1	Score	Team 2
1 March 1972
Politehnica Timișoara (Div. B)	2–0	(Div. A) Steaua București
5 March 1972
Petrolistul Boldești (Div. C)	1–2 (a.e.t.)	(Div. A) ASA 1962 Târgu Mureș
Tractorul Brașov (Div. C)	3–0	(Div. A) Politehnica Iași
Metalul București (Div. B)	1–0	(Div. A) Steagul Roșu Brașov
Dunărea Calafat (Div. C)	1–0	(Div. A) Petrolul Ploiești
Unirea Drăgășani (Div. C)	2–0	(Div. A) UTA Arad
FC Galați (Div. B)	2–1 (a.e.t.)	(Div. A) Farul Constanța
Cimentul Medgidia (Div. C)	0–2	(Div. A) CFR Cluj
Petrolul Moinești (Div. C)	1–4	(Div. A) Dinamo București
Textila Odorheiu Secuiesc (Div. C)	0–3	(Div. A) Jiul Petroșani
Metalul Plopeni (Div. B)	1–2	(Div. A) ASA Crișul Oradea
Olimpia Râmnicu Sărat (Div. C)	0–3	(Div. A) Argeș Pitești
Olimpia Satu Mare (Div. B)	2–1	(Div. A) Universitatea Craiova
CFR Timișoara (Div. B)	0–1 (a.e.t.)	(Div. A) SC Bacău
Minaur Zlatna (Div. C)	0–0 (a.e.t.)	(Div. A) Rapid București
9 March 1972
Minerul Baia Mare (Div. B)	0–0 (a.e.t.)	(Div. A) Universitatea Cluj

== Second round proper ==
Team 1	Score	Team 2
15 March 1972
Politehnica Timișoara	1–1 (a.e.t.)	ASA Crişul Oradea
Jiul Petroșani	1–0	SC Bacău
Metalul București	3–1	Argeș Pitești
Olimpia Satu Mare	0–2	ASA 1962 Târgu Mureș
FC Galați	0–0 (a.e.t.)	Universitatea Cluj
Unirea Drăgășani	0–2	Rapid București
Tractorul Brașov	2–3	Dinamo București
Dunărea Calafat	0–2	CFR Cluj

== Quarter-finals ==
Team 1	Score	Team 2
29 March 1972
Rapid București	1–0 (a.e.t.)	FC Galați
Jiul Petroșani	4–1	CFR Cluj
Metalul București	4–1	ASA 1962 Târgu Mureș
Dinamo București	2–0	Politehnica Timișoara

== Semi-finals ==
Team 1	Score	Team 2
28 June 1972
Rapid București	3–2	Metalul București
Jiul Petroșani	2–2 (a.e.t.)(7–6 p)	Dinamo București‡

Notes:

- ‡ Jiul Petroşani vs. Dinamo București is first match from Romanian Cup finished after penalty kicks.

== Final ==
2 July 1972
17:30 EET

Rapid București	2–0	Jiul Petroșani
Marin 3'; Neagu 27'	Report

23 August, Bucharest
Attendance: 30,000
Referee: Gheorghe Limona (Bucharest)

Cupa României 1971–72 winners

8th title
