= 1947 Cup of the Ukrainian SSR =

The 1947 Ukrainian Cup was a football knockout competition conducting by the Football Federation of the Ukrainian SSR and was known as the Ukrainian Cup.

== Competition schedule ==
=== First elimination round ===
All games of the round took place on 21 September 1947, and replay next day on 22 September 1947.

| Traktor KhTZ Kharkiv | 10:1 | Dynamo Sumy |
| Stal Dniprodzerzhynsk | 4:1 | Spartak Kryvyi Rih |
| Spartak Drohobych | 1:4 | Dynamo Uzhhorod |
| Avanhard Kherson | 1:2 | Sudnobudivnyk Mykolaiv |
| Traktor Dnipropetrovsk | 3:1 | Traktor Osypenko |
| Shakhtar Kadiivka | 3:1 | Shakhtar Makiivka [Chervonohvardiyskyi Raion] |
| Stal Voroshylovsk | 5:0 | Stal Kostiantynivka |
| Stal Mariupol | 4:0 | Dzerzhynets Voroshylovhrad |
| Zhytomyr team | 4:0 | Dynamo Proskuriv |
| DO Cherkassy | 1:2 | Molniya Kyiv |
| Dynamo Chernihiv | 1:5 | Dynamo Poltava | 2:2 (replay) |
| Burevisnyk Lviv | 0:1 | Lokomotyv Rivne | 1:1 (replay) |

=== Second elimination round ===
All games of the round took place on 28 September 1947.

| Dynamo Poltava | 4:3 | Traktor Dnipropetrovsk |
| Dynamo Stanislav | 5:1 | Lokomotyv Rivne |
| Stal Dniprodzerzhynsk | 3:2 | Stal Mariupol |
| Dynamo Kirovohrad | 4:0 | Zhytomyr team |
| Odesa team | ?:? | Sudnobudivnyk Mykolaiv |
| Stal Voroshylovsk | -/+ | Shakhtar Kadiivka | (no show or forfeit) |
| Traktor KhTZ Kharkiv | 4:1 | Molniya Kyiv |

=== Third elimination round ===
All games of the round took place on 5 October 1947.

| Sudnobudivnyk Mykolaiv | +/- | Dynamo Kherson | (1:1 after the first half) |
| Dynamo Uzhhorod | 5:1 | Dynamo Lutsk | (played in Lviv) |
| Bilshovyk Mukachevo | 7:0 | Dynamo Stanislav |
| Bilshovyk Zaporizhia | 3:1 | Stal Dniprodzerzhynsk |
| Lokomotyv Yasynuvata | 8:1 | Dynamo Poltava |

=== Fourth elimination round ===
All games of the round took place on 12 October 1947.

| Spartak Kherson | 4:2 | Bilshovyk Zaporizhia |
| Avanhard Kramatorsk | 3:2 | Shakhtar Stalino |
| Lokomotyv Yasynuvata | 4:1 | Stal Dnipropetrovsk |
| Dynamo Uzhhorod | 1:2 | Spartak Lviv |
| Bilshovyk Mukachevo | 2:5 | Spartak Uzhhorod |
| Sudnobudivnyk Mykolaiv | 5:0 | Sudnobudivnyk Mykolaiv |
| Dynamo Kyiv | 2:1 | Dzerzhynets Kharkiv |

=== Fifth elimination round ===
All games of the round took place on 19 October 1947.

| Spartak Kherson | 3:0 | Sudnobudivnyk Mykolaiv |
| Dynamo Kirovohrad | 0:5 | Avanhard Kramatorsk |
| Spartak Lviv | 1:2 | Spartak Uzhhorod |
| Lokomotyv Yasynuvata | ?:? | Dynamo Kyiv |

=== Quarterfinals ===
Games between Dynamos and in Kherson were played on 26 October 1947, other on 1 November 1947.

| Spartak Kherson | 1:2 | Lokomotyv Kharkiv |
| Dynamo Kyiv | 6:0 | Dynamo Kyiv |
| Kharchovyk Odesa | 1:0 | Spartak Uzhhorod |
| ODO Kiev | -/+ | Avanhard Kramatorsk | (no show or forfeit) |

=== Semifinals ===
All games of the round took place on 2 November 1947.

| Dynamo Kyiv | 4:1 | Lokomotyv Kharkiv |
| Kharchovyk Odesa | 2:0 | Avanhard Kramatorsk |

=== Final ===
9 November 1947
14:00

| Dynamo Kyiv | 5–1 | Kharchovyk Odesa |
|---|---|---|
| Chaplyhin 7', 10'; Dashkov 20'; Vinkovatov 47'; Dementyev 49' | | Potapov 34' |

Dynamo Stadium, Kyiv
Attendance: 12,000
Referee: Shablynskyi (Kyiv)

== Top goalscorers ==
| Scorer | Goals | Team |
|---|---|---|
| (Ukrainian Soviet Socialist Republic) | ? | |

Ukrainian Cup 1947 Winners

FC Mashynobudivnyk Kyiv
Second title

== See also ==
- Soviet Cup
- Ukrainian Cup
