= Semyon Zapadny =

Semyon Izrailevich Zapadny (real name Semyon Kesselman; Russian: Семён Израилевич Западный (Кессельман), 1899 – 5 February 1938) was a Chekist, state security commissar of 3rd degree (general level rank), member of the NKVD special troikas, a chief of the Kiev Okruha GPU (KGB) in 1925-1928 and Khabarovsk Oblast in 1934–37.

He was born in Odessa, Russian Empire, as Semyon Kesselman. In 1914 Zapadny graduated from the Jewish treasury school in Odessa. In July 1917 Zapadny joined the Odessa Red Guards (organized by Bolshevik Military Organizations) and later around the October Revolution joined the Bolshevik Party. Zapadny participated in the Odessa Bolshevik uprising in December 1917. With the ongoing Soviet–Ukrainian War, he joined the Workers'-Peasants' Red Army. After signing of the Treaty of Brest-Litovsk and occupation of Ukraine by the Central Powers, in April 1918 to August 1919 he was one of leaders of the Odessa underground Bolsheviks committee on intelligence and counterintelligence (Odessa Cheka was headed by Boris Severny [Yuzefovich]). Sometime in 1919 Zapadny officially joined Cheka, becoming member of the Odessa Governorate Cheka collegium. He remained among the high-ranking Cheka and GPU officers in Ukraine until 1930.

In 1919 he was one of the main chekists in Ukraine during the events of Russian Civil War. During the advance of the Armed Forces of South Russia, Zapadny served as a military intelligence officer in the 12th Army of the Southern Front.

In 1921 for a short period Zapadny was acting chief of Cheka in Volhynian Governorate (Zhytomyr) and in 1922-24 headed Cheka in the capital Kharkiv Governorate. In 1925-28 he was a chief of GPU in Kiev Okruha.

Zapadny is also considered as one of founders of FC Dynamo Kyiv in 1927–28.

In 1930 he was transferred to Far Eastern Krai of the Russian SFSR where Zapadny continued his career as a Soviet security officer. In 1934-37 he was a chief of NKVD in Khabarovsk Oblast and a deputy chief of NKVD of Far Eastern Krai. On 25 November 1935 he was promoted to the rank of state security commissar of 3rd degree. On 14 February 1935 Zapadny was awarded the Order of the Red Banner.

On August 8, 1937, he was arrested and executed by shooting on February 5, 1938. In 1980 Zapadny was rehabilitated by the Supreme Court presidium of the Soviet Union.

Zapadny had three siblings (two brothers, one sister) who also were agents of KGB. His brother Arnold Arkadievich Arnoldov (1893–1938) was awarded a rank of senior major of state security and was a recipient of two St. George Crosses of the Russian Empire.
