= 1948 Cup of the Ukrainian SSR =

The 1948 Ukrainian Cup was a football knockout competition conducting by the Football Federation of the Ukrainian SSR and was known as the Ukrainian Cup.

== Competition schedule ==
=== First elimination round ===
All games of the round took place on 3 October 1948, and replay next day on 4 October 1948.

Stal Dniprodzerzhynsk	+/-	Dynamo Uzhhorod	(no show)
Stal Dnipropetrovsk	5:2	Stal Kostiantynivka
Shakhtar Stalino	1:0	ODO Kiev
Spartak Lviv	5:1	Dynamo Sumy
Kharchovyk Odesa	2:0	Sudnobudivnyk Mykolaiv
Bilshovyk Mukachevo	6:2	Avanhard Kramatorsk
Lokomotyv Zaporizhia	+/-	Torpedo Odesa	(no show)
Torpedo KhTZ Kharkiv	5:2	Dynamo Voroshylovhrad	2:2 (replay)

- Notes: Dynamo Vinnytsia withdrew

=== Second elimination round ===
All games of the round took place on 10 October 1948, and replay next day on 11 October 1948.

Stal Dnipropetrovsk	1:3	Shakhtar Stalino	3:3 (replay)
Dynamo Kyiv	2:1	Spartak Uzhhorod
Spartak Kherson	1:0	Stal Dniprodzerzhynsk
Bilshovyk Mukachevo	2:0	Lokomotyv Vinnytsia
Shakhtar Kadiivka	+/-	Dynamo Voznesensk	(no show or forfeit)
Spartak Lviv	4:1	Torpedo KhTZ Kharkiv
Kharchovyk Odesa	2:0	m/u 25750 Kyiv (ODO (reserves) Kyiv)
Lokomotyv Zaporizhia	x:x	?

=== Quarterfinals ===
All games were played in Kyiv.

Dynamo Kyiv	3:2	Spartak Kherson	(played on 17 October)
Shakhtar Stalino	2:1	Spartak Lviv	(played on 18 October)
Lokomotyv Zaporizhia	5:1	Shakhtar Kadiivka	(played on 20 October)
Kharchovyk Odesa	1:2	Bilshovyk Mukachevo	2:2 (first replay played on 19 October), 4:3 (second replay played on 20 October, protested and annulled), (third game was played in 22 October)

=== Semifinals ===
All games were played in Kyiv.

Dynamo Kyiv	1:0	Stakhtar Stalino	(played on 21 October)
Bilshovyk Mukachevo	3:1	Lokomotyv Zaporizhia	(played on 24 October)

=== Final ===
26 October 1948
15:00

Dynamo Kyiv	4–1	Bilshovyk Mukachevo
Zhylin 16', 44'; Ponomaryov 46'; Vinkovatov 78'		Egervary 83' (pen.)

Dynamo Stadium, Kyiv
Attendance: 7,000
Referee: Razdorozhniuk (Odesa)

== Top goalscorers ==
Scorer	Goals	Team
(Ukrainian Soviet Socialist Republic)	?	

Ukrainian Cup 1948 Winners

FC Mashynobudivnyk Kyiv
Second title

== See also ==
- Soviet Cup
- Ukrainian Cup
