= FC Dynamo Kyiv =

Association football club in Ukraine

Dynamo Kyiv
- Full name: Футбольний клуб «Динамо» Київ; Football Club Dynamo Kyiv
- Nicknames: Bilo-syni (The Blue & Whites), kyyany (Kyivans)
- Short name: DKY
- Founded: 13 May 1927; 99 years ago
- Ground: Olimpiyskiy National Sports Complex; Valeriy Lobanovskyi Dynamo Stadium
- Capacity: 70,050; 16,873
- Owner: Ihor Surkis (63.71%); Investment Fund "Sports Capital" (23%); Alutsiana Commercial Ltd (Cyprus) (11.26%); Dynamo (.66%); Svitlana Lobanovska (.72%)
- President: Ihor Surkis
- Head coach: Maciej Kędziorek (interim)
- League: Ukrainian Premier League
- 2025–26: Ukrainian Premier League, 4th of 16
- Website: fcdynamo.com
Home colours	Away colours

Football Club Dynamo Kyiv, also known as Dynamo Kyiv, Dynamo Kiev, or simply Dynamo, (Ukrainian: Футбольний клуб «Динамо» Київ, romanized: Futbolnyy klub «Dynamo» Kyiv, [dɪˈnɑmo ˈkɪjiu̯]) is a Ukrainian professional football club based in Kyiv. Founded in 1927 as a branch of the bigger Soviet Dynamo Sports Society, the club as a separate business entity was officially formed only in 1989 and currently plays in the Ukrainian Premier League. The club has secured brand rights from the Ukrainian Dynamo society and has no direct relations with the sports society since 1989. The Ukrainian Dynamo society remains a minority shareholder of the company that owns the club. Their home is the 70,050-seat Olimpiyskiy National Sports Complex.

Since 1936, Dynamo Kyiv has spent its entire history in the top league of Soviet and later Ukrainian football, having never been relegated to a lower division. During the Soviet era, the club was one of the main rivals, and often the only rival, to football clubs from Moscow. Its ability to challenge the dominance of the Moscow clubs in Soviet football, and frequently defeat them to win the Soviet championship, was a matter of national pride for Ukraine. Leaders of the Ukrainian SSR unofficially regarded the club as their national team and provided it with generous support, making Dynamo a professional team of international importance.

The club's most successful periods are associated with Valeriy Lobanovskyi, who coached the team during three stints, leading them to numerous domestic and European titles. In 1961, the club became first-ever in the history of Soviet football that managed to overcome the total hegemony of Moscow-based clubs in the Soviet Top League. The Spartak Moscow–Dynamo Kyiv rivalry that began in the mid-1970s, is widely considered to have been one of the most exciting football rivalries in the Soviet Union. Since becoming the first Soviet football club to participate in UEFA competition in 1965, Dynamo Kyiv has played in European competitions almost every season.

Over its history, Dynamo Kyiv have won 17 Ukrainian top-flight league titles, 13 Soviet top-flight league titles, 14 Ukrainian national cup competitions, 9 Soviet national cup competitions, and three continental titles (including two UEFA Cup Winners' Cups). Its two European Cup Winners' Cups make it one of the only two Soviet clubs to have won a UEFA trophy, the other being Dinamo Tbilisi. The Dynamo Kyiv first team became a base team for the Soviet Union national football team in the 1970–1980s and the Ukraine national football team in the 1990–2000s. The three stars on the club's crest each signify 10 top-flight seasons Dynamo Kyiv won. The club was recognised as the Eastern European Club of the 20th Century by France-Presse.

== History ==
=== Early history: 1927–1941 ===
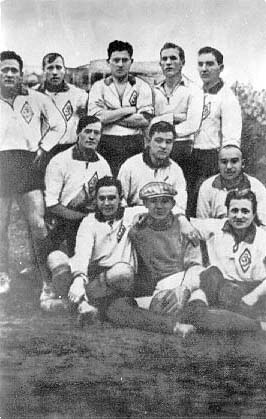
Dynamo Kyiv in 1928

The club was established on the base of the first squad of Kyiv's branch of the all-Union Dynamo sports society and its republican branch in the Ukrainian SSR, originally headquartered Kharkiv. The all-Union Dynamo sports society was a sports department of the Soviet state security KGB, originally Cheka-OGPU. During the Soviet period Dynamo's players same as players of all Dynamos in the Soviet Union were officially Soviet uniform servicemembers earning rank, salary, and pension when playing on the team of masters.

On 13 May 1927, the statute of the Kyivan Proletarian Sport Society (PST) Dynamo was officially registered by the special commission in affairs of public organizations and unions of the Kyiv district. The All-Union sport society of Dynamo in Moscow was formed earlier in 1923 on the initiative of the Felix Dzerzhinsky. A year later the first Ukrainian branch cell of the Dynamo sports society was formed in Kharkiv. Under the banner of Kyivan Dynamo gathered the representatives of the local GPU (State Political Directorate), the Soviet secret police, the best footballers of which defended the honors of the Trade Union club "Sovtorgsluzhashchie", a portmanteau for Soviet retail servicemen. It was a common practice of the early Soviet sports societies that were formed based on already existing "pre-revolutionary" (1917 Bolshevik Revolution) sports societies in 1920s.

The leadership of Dynamo did not dare to reorganize the well-established club and the main title contender in the middle of a playing season. Therefore, the first mention of the football club Dynamo could only be found on 5 April 1928 in the Russian-language newspaper (at that time) Vecherniy Kiev ("Evening Kyiv").

The Kyivan Sport Society Dynamo currently is organizing its own football team. "Dynamo" petitioned to Okrsofik for inclusion of its team in the playing season.

It was then when by the initiative of Semyon Zapadny, chief of the Kyiv GPU, the football team was created. His deputy, Sergei Barminsky, started to form the team not only out of regular chekists (members of the Soviet secret police), but also footballers of other clubs in the city among which is mentioned a team "Sovtorgsluzhaschie". All the footballers were either part of the consolidated city team or the city champions. The newly created team played its first official match on 1 July 1928 against a local consolidated city team while visiting Bila Tserkva. Already on the fifth minute the Dynamo-men opened the score in the game, however, at the end the club lost it 1–2. On 15 July, the Bila Tserkva newspaper Radyanska Nyva ("Soviet Fields") put it in such words:

In the second halftime Bila Tserkva easily strikes the ball in the net, thus, equalizing the score. Kyiv tried several counter attacks and even earned a free kick which was not able to convert. Near the end Bila Tserkva under the applause of thousands of spectators strikes in the second ball. The final whistle of the referee has fixated the victory of Bila Tserkva with the score 2:1.

Club logo in 1927-1939

The next match played by Dynamo was on 17 July 1928 hosting another Dynamo from the port city of Odesa. The match ended in draw 2:2. At the end of July Dynamo toured Belarus playing against the republican team of Belarus (1:5) and the districtal team of Gomel District (3:2). On 1 September 1928 Dynamo Kyiv was hosting the Dynamo's primary team from Moscow and were thrashed 2:6. It was then Dynamo Kyiv was led by a playing coach Vasyl Boiko whose role is indicated as an instructor-organizer. Later in October 1928 Dynamo Kyiv took part in its first official tournament the 1928 Kyiv city championship and won it. On 18 November 1928 Dynamo Kyiv overpowered the Kyiv's main football team of that period, Zheldor, 1:0.

On 14 September 1929 Dynamo Kyiv played its first international match against visiting workers' team from Deutsch-Wagram, Lower Austria and lost it 3:4. Its club stadium Dynamo opened on 12 June 1933, a year before the Soviet government turned the city into capital of the Soviet Ukraine. As the club gained more experience and played on a regular basis, it started to fill the stadium with spectators with both the club and football in general gaining popularity in Soviet Ukraine.

During the first years of its existence, Dynamo predominantly took part in friendly games and until 1935 participated in the annual Ukrainian championship contested by member teams of Dynamo Society. Between 1932 and 1934 the team was on the verge of disbandment due to changes in OGPU leadership, but it became possible to preserve it thanks to the work of manager Lazar Kohen and leading players Anton Idzkovsky and Konstantin Schegotsky. After the Soviet government relocated Ukraine's capital to Kyiv in 1934, Dynamo received patronage from the republican leadership.

In 1936, the first Soviet Championship was played, and Dynamo Kyiv was one of the pioneers of the newly formed league. Under the leadership of head coach Mikhail Tovarovsky, the club finished second in the 1936 Soviet Top League, losing in the final to Spartak Moscow. In 1937 Dynamo took the 3rd place in the championship. In the 1941 season, the club only played nine matches as World War II interrupted league play.

=== Football in occupation and Start: 1941–1943 ===
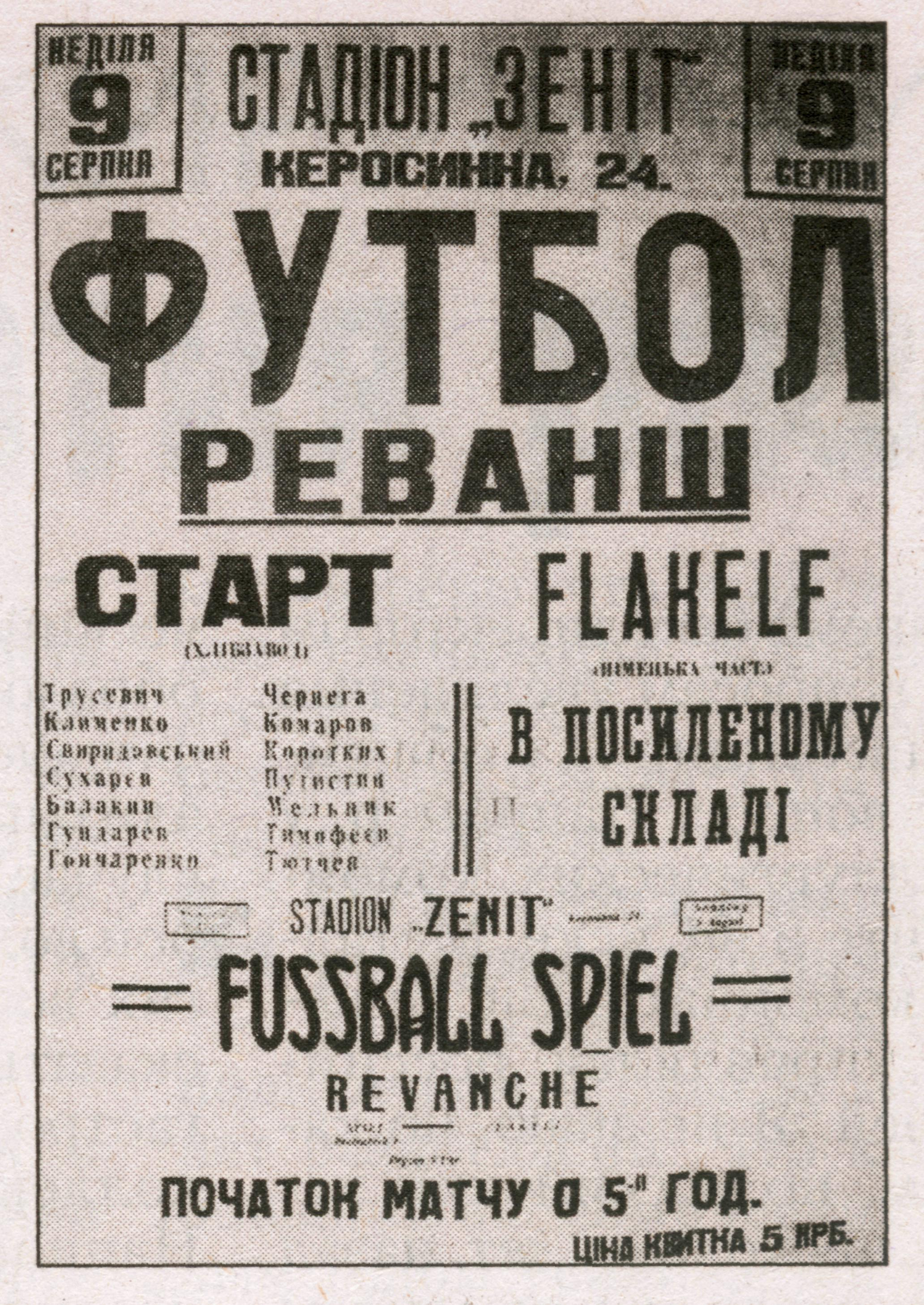
Poster of the return match (in Ukrainian Cyrillic / German Latin)

With the start of the German-Soviet War, as part of World War II, most sports events in the Soviet Union were suspended or discontinued. Some sports organizations and individual athletes were evacuated to Soviet Central Asia or east of the Volga River. Many footballers joined the ranks of the Soviet Red Army either voluntarily or through mobilization. Kyiv ended up under German occupation within a few months of Operation Barbarossa due to the successful encirclement of Soviet troops by German forces.

After the Nazi occupation of Ukraine began, former professional football players (Dynamo and Lokomotyv) found employment in the city's Bakery No. 3, and continued to play amateur football. The team participated in exhibition games that took place in the city among various other teams, including teams composed of the Wehrmacht soldiers. The Kyiv team played under the name of "Start", comprising eight players from Dynamo Kyiv (Mykola Trusevych, Mykhailo Svyridovskiy, Mykola Korotkykh, Oleksiy Klymenko, Fedir Tyutchev, Mikhail Putistin, Ivan Kuzmenko, and Makar Honcharenko) and three players from Lokomotyv Kyiv (Vladimir Balakin, Vasyl Sukharev, and Mykhailo Melnyk).

In July and August 1942, "Start" played a series of matches against the Germans and their allies. On 12 July, a German army team was defeated. A stronger army team was selected for the next match on 17 July, which "Start" defeated 6–0. On 19 July, "Start" defeated the Hungarian team MSG Wal 5–1. The Hungarians proposed a return match, held on 26 July, but were defeated again, 3–2.

"Start"'s streak was noticed and a match was announced for 6 August against a "most powerful" "undefeated" German Luftwaffe Flakelf (anti-aircraft artillery) team, but despite the game being talked up by the newspapers, they failed to report the 5–1 result. On 9 August, "Start" played a "friendly" against Flakelf and again defeated them. The team defeated Rukh 8:0 on 16 August, and afterwards, some of "Start"'s players were arrested by the Gestapo, tortured – Mykola Korotkykh died during the torture – and sent to the nearby labour camp at Syrets. There is speculation that the players were arrested due to the intrigues of Georgy Shvetsov, founder and trainer of the "Rukh" team, as the arrests were made a couple of days after "Start" defeated "Rukh".

In February 1943, following an attack by partisans or a conflict between the prisoners and administration, one-third of the prisoners at Syrets were killed in reprisal, including Ivan Kuzmenko, Oleksiy Klymenko, and goalkeeper Mykola Trusevych. Three of the other players – Makar Honcharenko, Fedir Tyutchev, and Mykhailo Sviridovskiy – who were in a work squad in the city that day, were arrested a few days later or, according to other sources, escaped and hid in the city until it was liberated.

Soviet war propaganda used the history of "Start" for mobilization purposes, claiming that the whole team had been executed by a firing squad in the summer of 1942 for defeating an All-Star team from the German armed forces by 5–1. The actual story, as recounted by Y. Kuznetsov, is considerably more complex. The match has subsequently came to be known in the Soviet media as "The Death Match", becoming part of the post-Soviet myth of the Great Patriotic War. The story inspired three films: the 1961 Hungarian film drama Two Half Times in Hell, the 1981 American film Escape to Victory, and the 2012 Russian film Match.

=== Road to the first championship title: 1944–1961 ===
Only on 2 May 1944, after the return of the Soviet regime, a friendly match between Dynamo Kyiv and Spartak Moscow took place at the Dynamo Stadium. From the pre-war (World War II) team there remained Anton Idzkovsky, Mykola Makhynia, Petro Laiko, Pavlo Vinkovatov, Mykola Balakin, Kostyantyn Kalach, including those who participated in the 1942 matches Makar Honcharenko and former Lokomotyv Kyiv players Volodymyr Balakin, Vasyl Sukharev.

In the first post-war years, all those who remained in the team were already quite old to play on the first team. Although in those years Dynamo Kyiv was joined by a whole group of younger footballers from Transcarpathian clubs (Vasyl Hodnychak, Ernest Yust, Zoltan Dyerfi, Zoltan Senhetovskyi, Mykhailo Koman, Dezyderiy Tovt and others), the team still could not really compete with other clubs, who endured the war better. In 1945, Dynamo took the penultimate place in the championship, and in 1946, the very last, and, according to the regulations, it was supposed to be relegated, but an exception was made for the team, remembering the wartime losses. In addition, these events were accompanied by coaching fever: from 1946 to 1951, the club changed ten coaches.

Club logo in 1939-1972

The 1948 season was the last that Dynamo took part in republican competitions, particularly the 1948 Football Cup of the Ukrainian SSR. To the Ukrainian football competitions, Dynamo returned only after dissolution of the Soviet Union in 1992.

The first post-war success was the victory in the doubles (reserves) tournament in the 1949 season. Since 1946, the Soviet first-tier league has been conducting a championship among younger players, which ran parallel to the championship among the first squads.

The turning point came during the 1951 season, before which Oleg Oshenkov took charge of the club. The new coach introduced to the main team younger players who had proven themselves well in doubles (reserves) competitions. He also drastically shortened the winter vacation of his players, offering them a serious physical training program that included sports games, various exercises, and even boxing. Already in the next championship, which took place in a round robin in Moscow, it brought the first results. Dynamo Kyiv turned from a mid-table team into one of the favorites, winning the silver medals, just behind Spartak Moscow. The club's success was contributed to by the support of Tymofiy Strokach, who served as the club's patron between the late 1930s and 1956.

Oshenkov's players achieved their first big victory during the 1954 Soviet Cup. On the way to the finals, the Kyiv team defeated Spartak Vilnius (4:2), Spartak Moscow (3:1), CDKA (3:1, in extra time), Zenit Leningrad (1:0, in extra time). In the cup's final at Moscow's "Dynamo Stadium", Kyiv's team faced off with a poorly known (at that time) Spartak Yerevan. The match took place in heavy rain and fog, but all the same, the Kyivans were able to defeat their opponents and win the Soviet Cup for the first time in their history. In the final match took part following players Oleg Makarov (goalkeeper), Arkadiy Larionov, Vitaliy Golubyev, Tiberiy Popovich, Oleksandr Koltsov, Mykhaylo Mykhalyna, Volodymyr Bohdanovych, Viktor Terentiev (substitute with Pavlo Vinkovatov), Andrei Zazroyev (captain), Mykhaylo Koman, Viktor Fomin and Oleg Oshenkov as a head coach. Goals in the final were scored by Terentiev and Koman.

On 29 July 1959, an international friendly match between the football teams "Dynamo" (Kyiv, Ukraine) and "Dynamo" (Note: The Bacău team was created in 1950.) (Bacău, Romania) took place in Kyiv, which ended with a score of 3:0.

At the end of the 1950s, the Dynamo revamped its squad. The club left Yevhen Lemeshko, Leonid Ostroushko, Ernest Yust, Mykola Romanov, Yuriy Shevchenko, Vitaliy Sobolev. The club's ranks were refilled with Serhiy Bohachyk, Ishtvan Sekech, Valeriy Lobanovskyi, Yevhen Snitko, Andriy Havashi, Vasyl Turyanchyk, Yozhef Sabo, while a well-known former CDKA player (the "Team of Lieutenants"), Vyacheslav Solovyov became the head coach. The 1960 season brought the Kyivans the "silver".

In the 1961 season, Dynamo won the Soviet Union championship for the first time. The team from the capital of the Ukrainian SSR finished ahead of Torpedo Moscow (title holders) by 4 points. Dynamo Kyiv played 30 matches in the national championship (16 participants). Only three of those matches Dynamo lost, and nine ended in a draw. The fact that they scored as many as 54 goals in 30 games testifies to the strength of the Dynamo's offensive line, where played such players like Oleh Bazylevych, Viktor Kanevskyi, Valeriy Lobanovskyi, Viktor Serebryanikov. And about the strength of the defensive line - the fact that the experienced goalkeeper Oleg Makarov never had to take the ball out of the net in 12 matches. It was the first time in the history of the Soviet Union championships, when the national title of the country's champion was gained by a non-Moscow club.

The first Dynamo gold medals received:
(first number indicates games played, second - goals scored (or allowed))

- Goalkeepers: Oleg Makarov (29, 26), Leonid Klyuev (4, 2).
- Defenders: Nikolay Koltsov (28), Anatoliy Suchkov (25), Volodymyr Shcheholkov (22), Vitaliy Shcherbakov (12), Vasyl Turyanchyk (9, 1), Vladimir Yerokhin (2).
- Midfielders: Yozhef Sabo (27, 3), Yuriy Voynov (21, 3), Volodymyr Anufriyenko (15), Vladimir Sorokin (3), Valeriy Verigin (3), Viktor Pestrykov (1).
- Forwards: Viktor Serebryanikov (29, 4), Valeriy Lobanovskyi (28, 10), Viktor Kanevskyi (26, 18), Oleh Bazylevych (26, 10), Andriy Biba (17, 5), Valentyn Troyanovskyi (15, 2), Mykola Kashtanov (11, 1), Igor Zaytsev (8, 1).
- Senior coach: Vyacheslav Solovyov. Team manager: Viktor Terentiev. Coach: Mykhaylo Koman.

=== The first "three-peat" and first European appearances: 1962–1973 ===
Starting from the early 1960s, Dynamo became one of the leading teams in Soviet football. Thanks to the support of Volodymyr Shcherbytsky, the players were provided favourable conditions to achieve highest results. After the triumphant season of 1961, in the following two seasons, Dynamo's position significantly worsened. In 1962, the team took 5th place, and the following year, 7th. In January 1964, Viktor Maslov took over as the club's head coach. On September 27, 1964, Dynamo won the 1964 Soviet Cup by defeating Krylia Sovetov Kuibyshev (Samara) in the final with a score of 1:0. Maslov and his subordinates were entrusted with becoming the first Soviet club to participate in a European club tournament. This was the 1965–66 UEFA Cup Winners' Cup.

The political motives of the USSR leadership explain everything. The communist ideology did not accept the possibility of Soviet athletes losing to capitalist rivals and played it safe for a long time. For example, the 1964 Soviet champion, Dinamo Tbilisi, was not trusted to participate in the 1965–66 European Cup. This continued until 1965, when Dynamo Kyiv was declared to participate in the Cup Winners' Cup. "We are entering a competition whose conditions, behind-the-scenes struggles, and specific tactical techniques are known to us only by hearsay," said Kyiv coach Viktor Maslov before the start.

I don't know why this decision was made, but our team had the feeling that we were being used as "guinea pigs." (as in animal testing) It was very convenient for the Moscow clubs with titles to watch the tournament without risking their reputation. We had to play "blindly": none of the opponents were known to us. There were no tapes of matches of future opponents anywhere near us. And for a representative of the coaching staff to go and watch the opponent's game live was something out of the realm of fantasy (see Iron Curtain). Everything was new and unknown. In one word, pioneers.

— Dynamo midfielder Andriy Biba, the author of the first Soviet goal in European club tournaments

However, the start of the tournament was successful as Dynamo defeated Coleraine from Northern Ireland with a score of 6:1 and 4:0. After that, Dynamo beat the Norwegian Rosenborg twice more - 4:1 and 2:0. But in the quarterfinals they were eliminated by Celtic (0:3 and 1:1), with whom they had to play in mid-January. Therefore, the playing form of the Kyiv team was far from optimal, and in addition, they played their home game not in Kyiv but in Tbilisi.

The following year, 1966, was one of the best in the history of Dynamo Kyiv. The team won the 1966 Soviet Class A Group 1 (top tier), ahead of Rostov SKA by 9 points, won the 1965–66 Soviet Cup (beating Torpedo 2:0 in the final), five Dynamo players (Sabo, Serebryanikov, Ostrovski, Porkujan, and Bannikov) won bronze medals at the 1966 FIFA World Cup in England, and Andriy Biba was recognized as the best football player of the year in the Soviet Union.

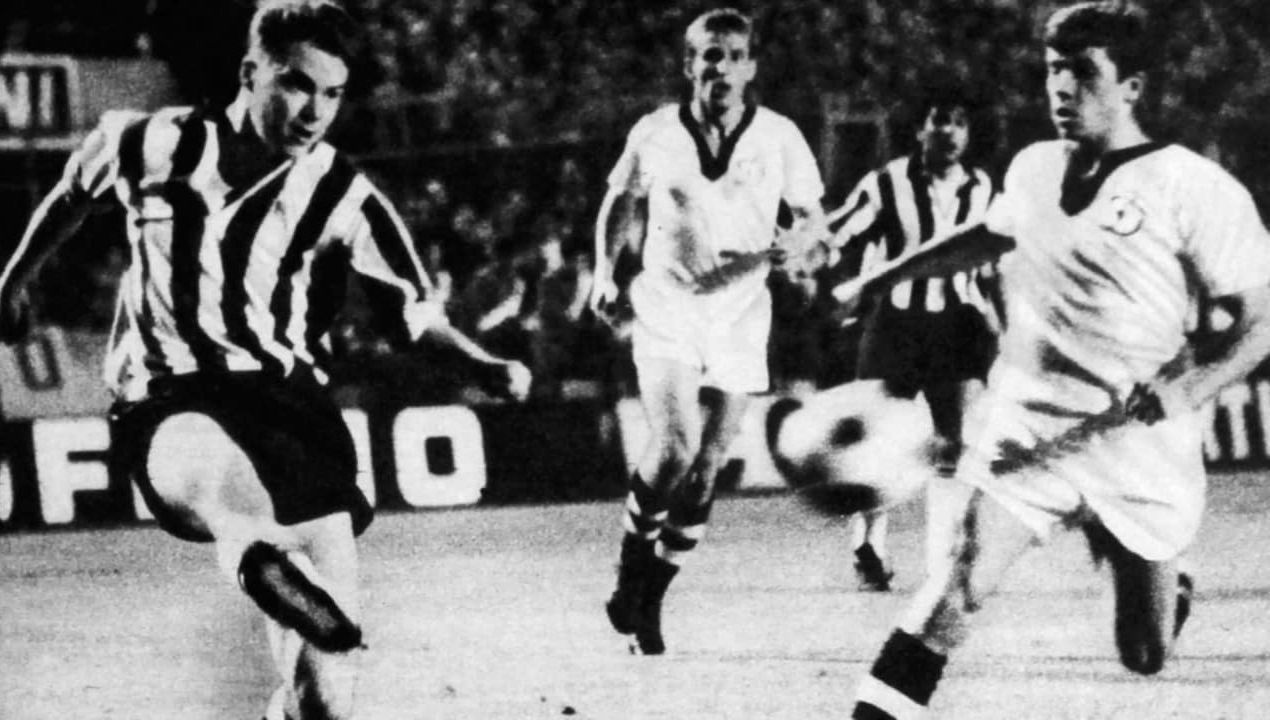
Dynamo playing against Juventus in a friendly game in Turin, 16 June 1967

In 1967 and 1968, Dynamo again won the Soviet Class A Group 1, thereby repeating the record of Moscow's CDKA, three championship titles in a row. In the same 1967, the Kyiv team made its debut in the 1967–68 European Cup. Maslov's team sensationally eliminated the current holder of the trophy, Scottish Celtic F.C., in the first stage, but lost to Polish champion Górnik Zabrze in the round of 16.

In 1969, Dynamo Kyiv finished second in the league, behind Spartak Moscow. In the 1969–70 European Cup, the Kyiv team defeated FK Austria Wien 2-1 and 3–1, but lost to Italian AC Fiorentina 1-2 and 0-0.

The following season, Dynamo finished only 7th in the championship. Turyanchyk, Sabo, Bannikov, and Porkujan left the team, and after the season ended, coach Viktor Maslov also left Dynamo.

In 1971, the team was coached by Honored coach of the USSR Aleksandr Sevidov, and 22-year-old Viktor Kolotov joined the club from Rubin. He later became one of the best midfielders in the history of Soviet football, being the captain of Dynamo for seven years, and in 1975–1976, the Soviet Union national team. Dynamo immediately won the Soviet championship, and the team's goalkeeper, Yevhen Rudakov, was recognized as the best goalkeeper and football player of the Soviet Union.

In 1972 and 1973, the team took second place, and Oleh Blokhin became the Dynamo's top scorer in both seasons with 14 and 18 goals, respectively.

=== The Lobanovskyi team: 1973–1988 ===
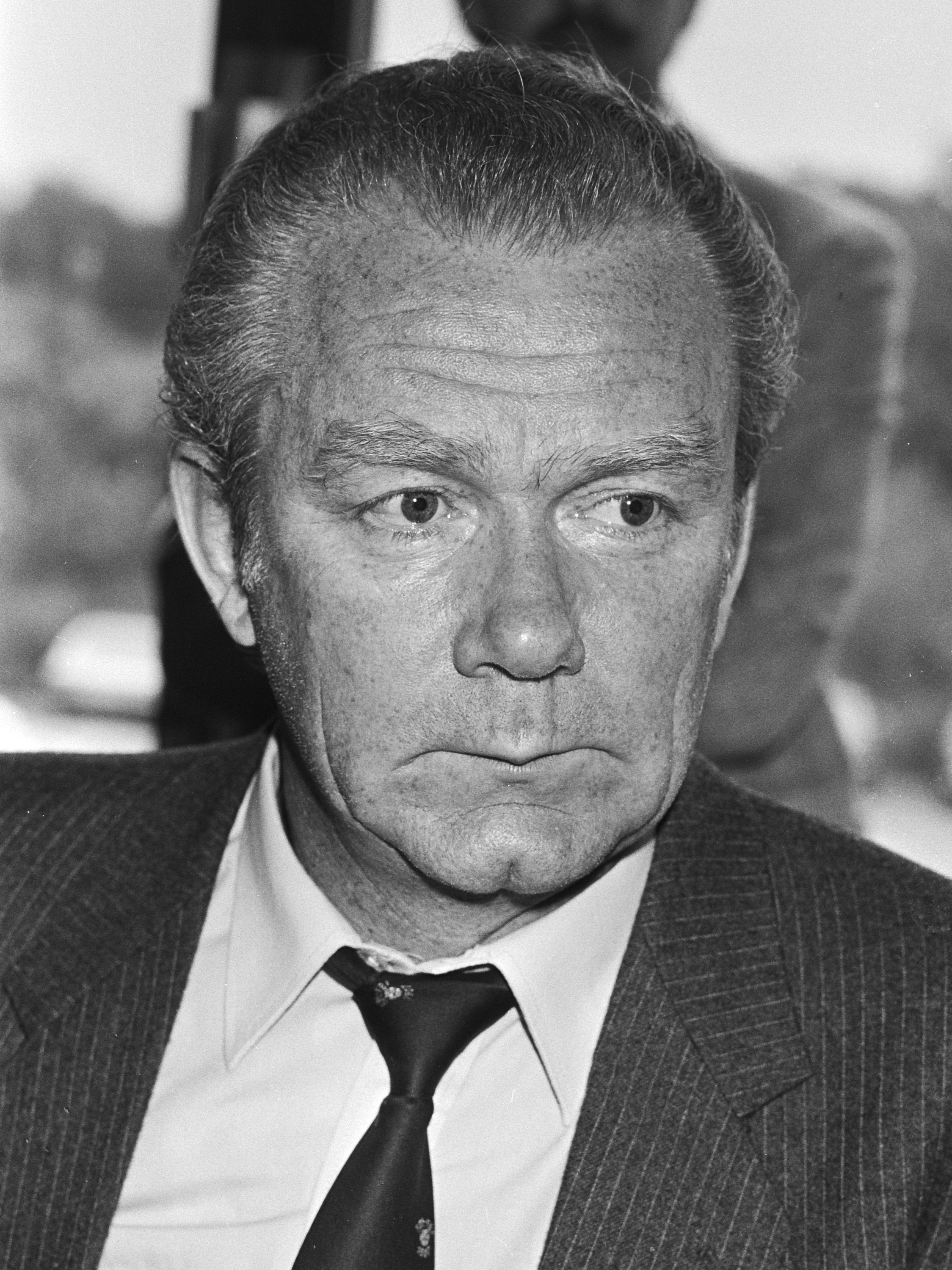
Valeriy Lobanovskyi, the most successful coach in Dynamo's history

In October 1973, before a match against Karpaty in Lviv (20 October 1973), the Kyiv team's players were introduced to a new head coach, 34-year-old Valeriy Lobanovskyi. In January 1974, Lobanovskyi was joined by his former Dynamo partner Oleh Bazylevych, who had coached Shakhtar Donetsk after his retirement. This tandem worked until the end of 1976. Both coaches had equal rights, although Bazylevych was primarily a prominent theorist, while Lobanovskyi organized the training process. In 1974, Anatoliy Puzach also joined the staff. Oleh Bazylevych initiated an invitation to join the club of physical training scientists. The physical training program for the players was developed by scientist Anatoliy Zelentsov. After the 1974 season, the press characterized the Dynamo's style under the new coaches not very positively and criticized them for rationalism, unwillingness to play attacking football away from home (the so-called "away model" - playing from defense to obtain a draw), and for performing at mediocre speeds. But good results were achieved in 1974, the Kyiv team won the 1974 Soviet Top League and the 1974 Soviet Cup.

A team was formed that could compete with the strongest teams in Europe. Yevhen Rudakov was in goal, Viktor Matvienko, Stefan Reshko, Mykhailo Fomenko, and Volodymyr Troshkin played in defense. In the midfield played, in particular, Volodymyr Muntyan, the young Leonid Buryak, who was progressing rapidly, the team captain Viktor Kolotov, and Volodymyr Veremeyev. Together with Oleh Blokhin, at the point of attack played Volodymyr Onyshchenko. The traditional Soviet "list of the 33 best football players" in 1974 included 8 Dynamo players, 7 of them at the number 1 position. During the 1970s and 1980s Dynamo's players constituted the base of the Soviet Union national team.

The "Lobanovskyi era" began with Dynamo's double in 1974 and Oleh Blokhin being recognized as the best football player in the country. In 1975, Dynamo won the championship again, 5 points ahead of Shakhtar. In 1975, Dynamo Kyiv won for football in the Soviet Union its first ever European trophies, the UEFA Cup Winners' Cup and the UEFA Super Cup. In the first three rounds of the 1974–75 European Cup Winners' Cup, the Kyiv team defeated CSKA Sofia, Eintracht Frankfurt, where the famous Jurgen Grabowski played, and the Turkish Bursaspor. Dynamo's semifinal opponent was the Dutch champion PSV. The game in Kyiv ended in a 3:0 rout defeat of the guests, and Dynamo lost the second game by a narrow margin of 1:2. In the final, which took place on May 14, 1975, in Basel, Lobanovskyi's team defeated the Hungarian Ferencvaros 3:0. Volodymyr Onyshchenko scored a brace (twice), and Oleh Blokhin scored one more goal.

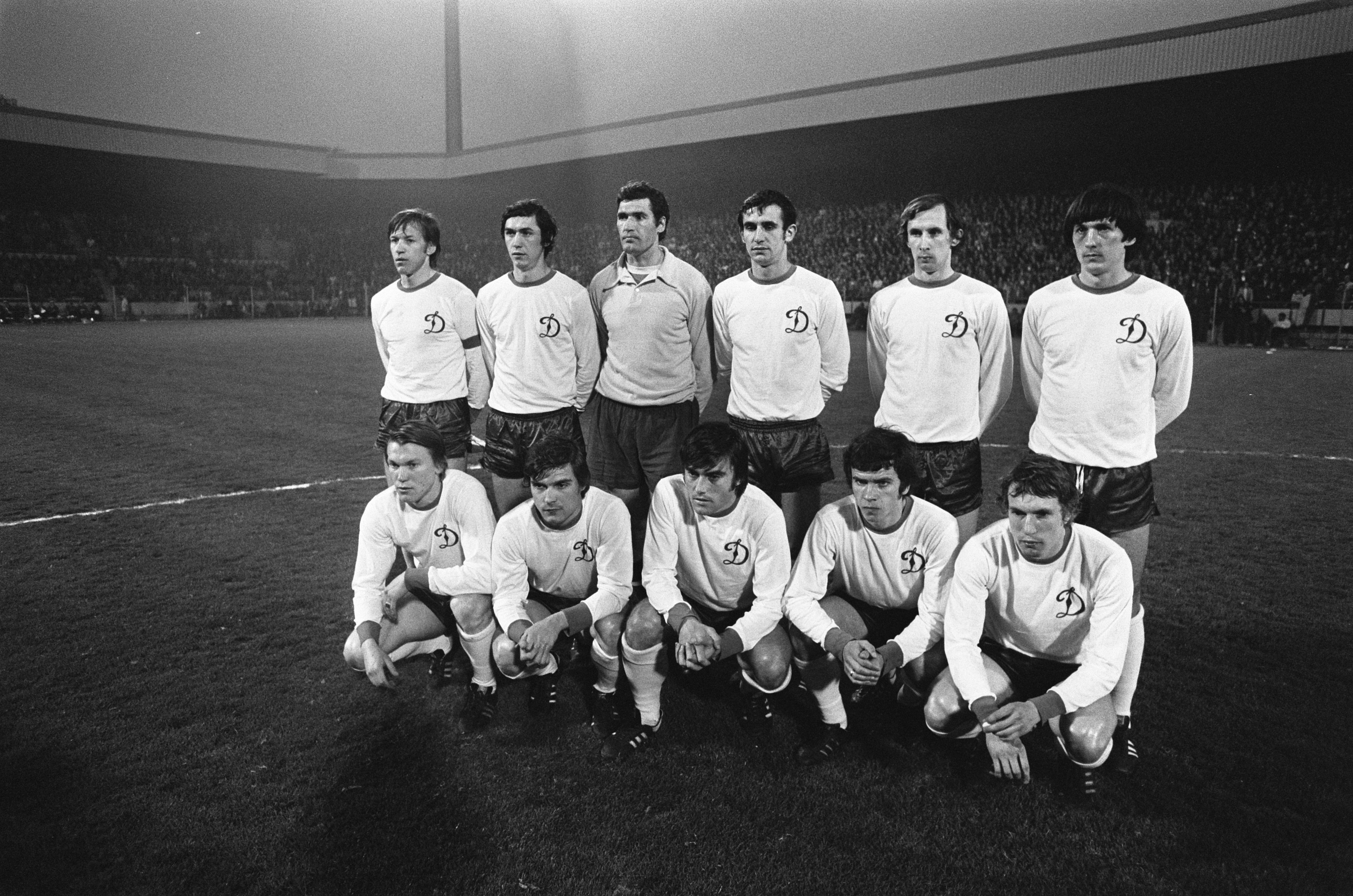
Dynamo squad before the away game against PSV in Eindhoven, 23 April 1975

The Dynamo's list of players that became holders of the 1975 European Cup Winners' Cup:
(first number indicates games played, second - goals scored (or allowed))

- Goalkeepers: Yevhen Rudakov (9, 5).
- Defenders: Mykhailo Fomenko (9), Viktor Matviyenko (9), Stefan Reshko (9), Volodymyr Troshkin (7), Viktor Maslov (2), Valeriy Zuyev (2), Serhiy Kuznetsov (1).
- Midfielders: Viktor Kolotov (9, 1), Volodymyr Muntyan (8, 2), Volodymyr Veremeyev (7), Leonid Buryak (6, 1), Anatoliy Konkov (5, 1).
- Forwards: Oleh Blokhin (9, 5), Volodymyr Onyshchenko (9, 7), Anatoliy Shepel (2).
- Senior coach: Valeriy Lobanovskyi.

According to the results of the tournament, Dynamo won 8 out of 9 matches, which is 88.88% of all matches, making it the best winning team at that time. That record was surpassed only in 2020 by FC Bayern Munich and later by some other teams.

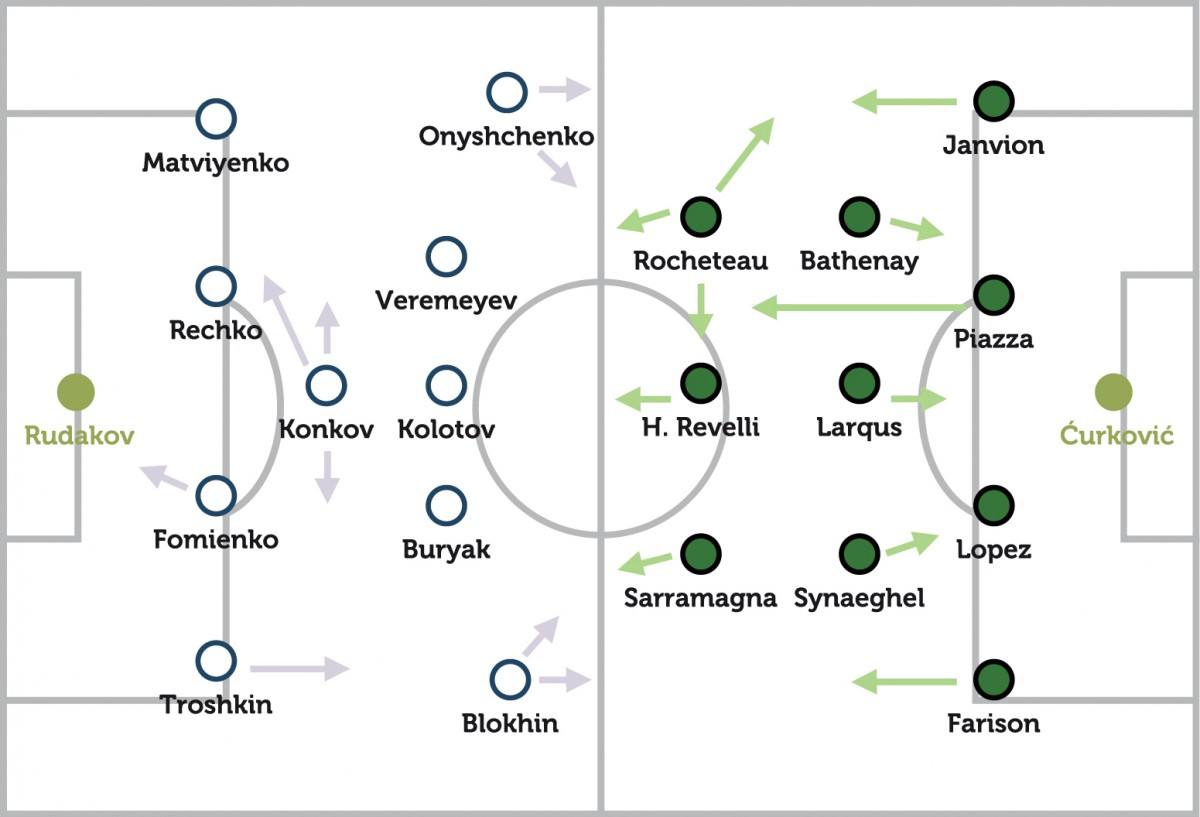
Dynamo Kyiv players (left) during the 1975-76 European Cup game against Saint-Étienne

In the autumn of the same 1975, a two-match confrontation with the European Cup winner, the German "Bayern", brought the Soviet footballers two "clean sheet" victories 1:0 in Munich and 2:0 in Kyiv and the title of the strongest team in Europe. Dynamo managed to beat the club, which was the base for the 1974 World Cup champion, the West Germany national team and had in its composition the stars of European football Sepp Maier, Franz Beckenbauer, Hans-Georg Schwarzenbeck and Gerd Müller.

All 3 goals in these games were scored by Oleh Blokhin, who at the end of the year was recognized by "France Football" as the best footballer in Europe and awarded the Ballon d'Or ("Golden Ball"). In addition to him, there was another Dynamo player in the classification, Leonid Buryak, who shared 23-26 places. At the same time, Dynamo set a record for the Soviet "list of 33 best football players": as many as 12 Kyivans were on the list, and 8 of them were ranked at No. 1. Ten the European Cup Winners' Cup holders received the highest sports title, "Honored Master of Sports". According to the 1975 results, the British Sports Journalists' Association recognized Dynamo Kyiv as the strongest football team in the world.

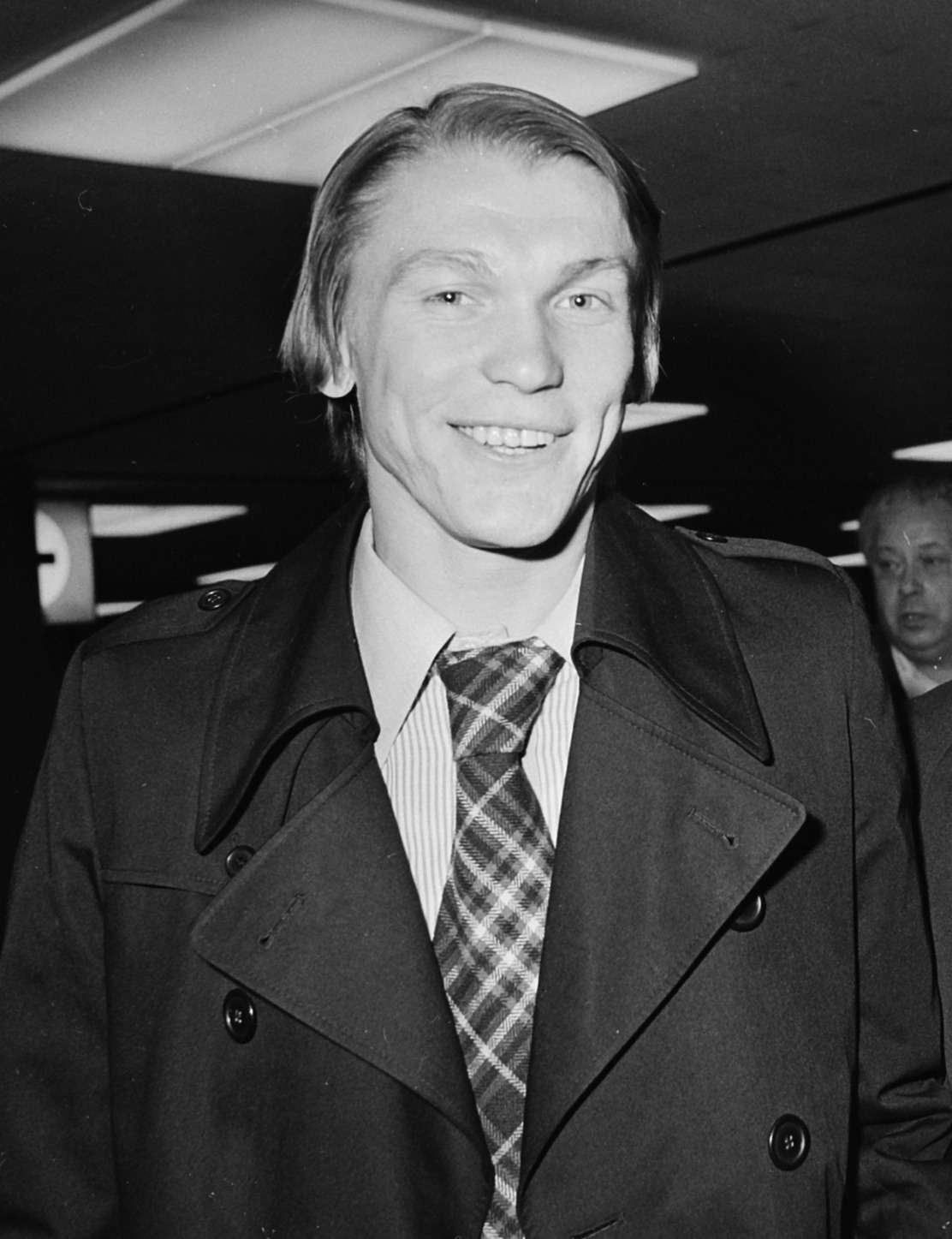
Oleh Blokhin, Dynamo's chief goalscorer, in 1977

After the triumph of 1975, a certain decline in Dynamo's game began, which lasted until 1985. The team continued to win Soviet trophies, but there was no breakthrough in the game. In addition, constant failures in European cups continued. In 1983, Valeriy Lobanovskyi, appointed head coach of the Soviet Union national football team, left Dynamo and returned to the club in 1984. The new "Lobanovskyi team" confirms its international class: Dynamo won the 1985–86 UEFA Cup Winners' Cup for the second time, and almost the entire Dynamo team as the USSR national team played at the 1986 FIFA World Cup and the 1988 European Championship, where it became the vice-champion of Europe. In 1986 Ihor Belanov became the second Dynamo player to win the Ballon d'Or.

The Dynamo's list of players that became holders of the 1986 European Cup Winners' Cup:
(first number indicates games played, second - goals scored (or allowed))

- Goalkeepers: Mykhaylo Mykhaylov (5, 5), Viktor Chanov (5, 3).
- Defenders: Anatoliy Demyanenko (9, 2), Oleh Kuznetsov (9), Serhiy Baltacha (8), Volodymyr Bezsonov (7).
- Midfielders: Vadym Yevtushenko (9, 3), Vasyl Rats (9, 2), Ivan Yaremchuk (9, 3), Andriy Bal (8), Oleksandr Zavarov (8, 5), Pavlo Yakovenko (8, 1), Oleksiy Mykhailychenko (1).
- Forwards: Oleh Blokhin (9, 5), Ihor Belanov (9, 5), Vasyl Yevseyev (1).
- Senior coach: Valeriy Lobanovskyi.

=== Last Soviet years and reformation: 1989–1993 ===
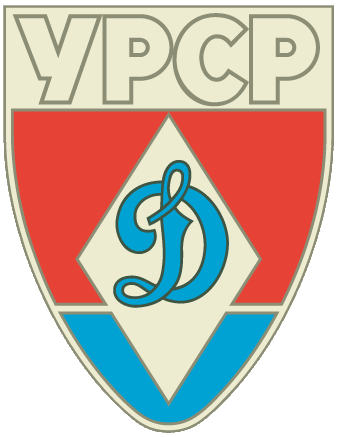
Logo (1972–1989) as part of republican Dynamo (Ukraine) society

In 1989, the club transitioned into an independent company, being disassociated from the Ukrainian republican society of Dynamo. The club transitioned from the Soviet "team of masters" to a regular professional football club of "western" style as it was interpreted then. It was also part of the Mikhail Gorbachev's Perestroika reforms, known as Khozrasschyot, when state enterprises had a difficult time keeping their associated organizations afloat and encouraged them to transform into self-sustained businesses.

During the last seasons of the Soviet Top League, Dynamo competed in the national colors of Ukraine as part of the national movement that grew very popular. In 1990 Dynamo won the Soviet league for a record 13th time, which became an unsurpassed record among Soviet teams, and took their 9th Soviet Cup.

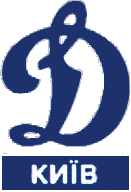
The original logo as professional club (1989–1996)

After the dissolution of the Soviet Union, the club became a member of the newly formed Ukrainian Premier League. By the summer of 1993, however, the club was in crisis as the economic policy of Dynamo president Viktor Bezverkhy set Dynamo on the path to bankruptcy. On 19 July 1993, an extraordinary assembly of coaches and players fired Bezverkhy and established a stock society called "Football Club "Dynamo (Kyiv)". Hryhoriy Surkis was elected president of the new company. The republican and city councils of the Dynamo society agreed to hand over two training centers and Dynamo Stadium to Dynamo Kyiv. The founders besides the football team and the Dynamo councils became also the commercial consulting centre Slavutych and the British firm Newport Management. A review board was created, consisting of directors of the Ministry of Interior of Ukraine, and the Security Service, Border Troops, and General Prosecutor of Ukraine.

=== Success in independent Ukraine: 1993–2009 ===
After Ukraine's independence, Dynamo's status as the country's principal club did not change, and they went on to dominate domestic competitions, winning or being runner-up in every year of the Premier League's existence and becoming a fixture in the UEFA Champions League. Its main rival in Ukraine is Shakhtar Donetsk, a club from the Donbas region, that came second to Dynamo several times before winning its first Premier League in 2002. The matches between these two sides are called the Ukrainian derby.

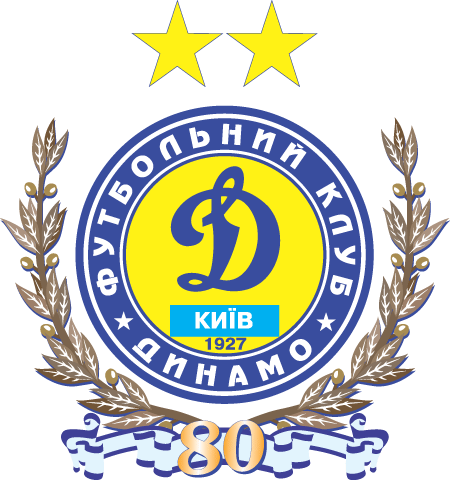
Logo of 1996–2010 to the 80th anniversary

Following the return of Valeriy Lobanovskyi to the position of team's manager in 1997, Dynamo returned to the rank of top international clubs, regularly participating in the UEFA Champions League and in 1999 advancing to the tournament's semifinals. After Lobanovskyi's death in 2002, he was followed on his post by a number of former Dynamo players. Following Ukraine's successful performance at the 2006 FIFA World Cup, 12 players of the club were awarded with the title Honoured Master of Sport of Ukraine.

In 2007, as a part of club's 80-year anniversary, two gold stars were added to the top of the crest, representing ten Ukrainian championship titles and ten USSR champion titles. Due to club's poor performance in the UEFA Champions League during the last two seasons, Dynamo's management took a somewhat unexpected decision by appointing the first foreign manager in the club's history. Previously, only former players or Dynamo football academy graduates became managers, but in December 2007 Russian coach Yuri Semin was invited to become the new manager of Dynamo Kyiv. However, the club yielded to Shakhtar Donetsk in both the Ukrainian Cup and Premier League in 2008. In 2009, in the club's most successful European campaign since 1999, Dynamo reached the semi-finals of the UEFA Cup (eliminating such teams as Valencia and Paris Saint-Germain) but was defeated at that stage by Shakhtar Donetsk. However, 2009 also brought success, as the club celebrated its 13th Premier League title.

=== Period of decline: 2010–2014 ===
In a season which contained their record win, a 9–0 victory over Illichivets Mariupol, the club only managed to finish runners-up in the league in 2010–11, after Shakhtar Donetsk. In what would be icon Andriy Shevchenko's final season at the club, Dynamo also finished as runners-up in 2011–12. In the 2011–12 season Dynamo also managed to reach the group stage of the Europa League after being eliminated in the Champions League third qualifying round by Rubin Kazan by 0–2 in Kyiv and 2–1 in Kazan. In the Europa League playoffs, the club managed to defeat Litex Lovech with a 3–1 aggregate score. In the group stage, Dynamo finished third after a disappointing campaign in a group containing Beşiktaş, Maccabi Tel Aviv and Stoke City.

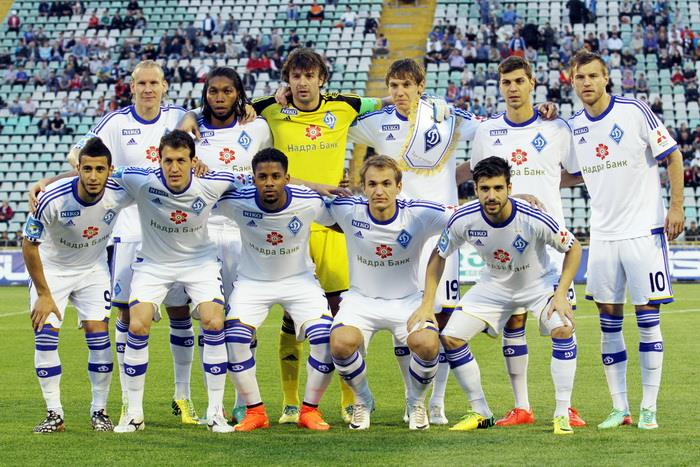
Dynamo squad before the 2014 Ukrainian Cup final

In April 2013, it was announced the club would play two European ties behind closed doors due to racism from fans during previous European ties. In the 2012–13 season, the club managed to qualify for the Champions League group stage after eliminating Feyenoord 3–1 and Borussia Mönchengladbach 4–3 on aggregate and qualified for the Champions League group stage. Dynamo was placed in a group with Paris Saint-Germain, Porto and Dinamo Zagreb and finished in third place with only five points and was eliminated in the Europa League round of 32 by Bordeaux 2–1 on aggregate. In the Premier League, Dynamo finished third, whereas in the Cup, it was eliminated in the round of 32. Overall, the 2012–13 season was a disappointment for Dynamo. The 2013–14 season was an equally disappointing season as Dynamo finished in fourth place in the league, the worst since the establishment of the Premier League and only managed to reach the round of 32 in the Europa League where it was eliminated by Valencia 2–0 on aggregate. Oleh Blokhin was sacked and was replaced by former player Serhii Rebrov. As a result, Dynamo managed to win the 2013–14 Ukrainian Cup for the first time in five years.

=== Revival: 2014–2016 ===
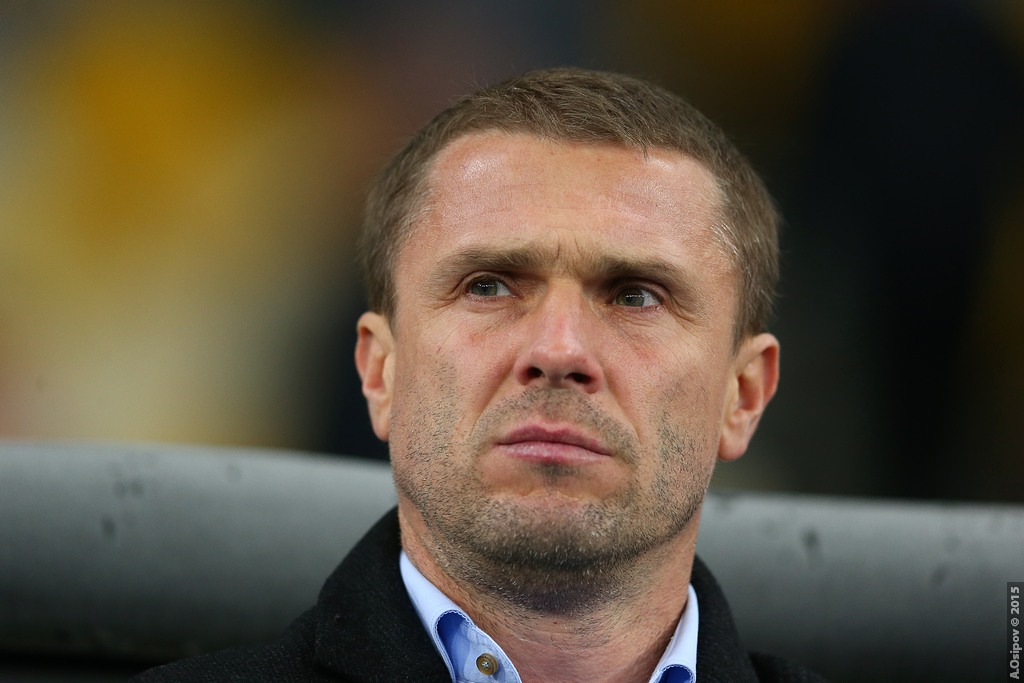
Serhii Rebrov, former player and manager of the team from 2014 to 2017

In the beginning of the 2014–15 season, Dynamo signed many promising players such as Aleksandar Dragović, Jeremain Lens (departed after end of the season), Łukasz Teodorczyk and Vitorino Antunes. Under Rebrov, Dynamo won the 2014–15 Ukrainian Premier League – undefeated – and the 2014–15 Ukrainian Cup to earn a domestic double for the first time in eight years. In the 2014–15 Europa League, Dynamo comfortably qualified from a group containing Aalborg BK, Steaua București and Rio Ave, finishing in first place with 15 points. In the round of 32, the club eliminated Guingamp 4–3 on aggregate, and in the round of 16, eliminated Everton 6–4 on aggregate after a spectacular 5–2 performance in Kyiv. Rebrov prioritized the passing game but focused on solid defensive foundations. However, in the quarter-finals of the Europa League, Dynamo was eliminated by Fiorentina 3–1 on aggregate.

In the beginning of the 2015–16 season, Dynamo signed the highly talented Derlis González and was drawn in Group G of the 2015–16 Champions League alongside Chelsea F.C., FC Porto and Maccabi Tel Aviv F.C. Dynamo finished in second place with 11 points after a spectacular performance and a memorable 0–2 in Porto. However, Dynamo was punished by UEFA for a racist incident in the home game against Chelsea where four black men were attacked in the stands by Dynamo fans.

Despite this, Dynamo reached the round of 16 in the Champions League for the first time since 2000, where it was drawn with Manchester City. Dynamo was eliminated 1–3 on aggregate but managed to hold an impressive 0–0 draw in Manchester. Dynamo's domestic performance was equally memorable as the club celebrated the 2015–16 Ukrainian Premier League only losing to archrival Shakhtar Donetsk 0–3 twice and was eliminated in the quarter-finals of the 2015–16 Ukrainian Cup. At the end of the season, several star performers (such as Miguel Veloso, Aleksandar Dragović, Younès Belhanda and Łukasz Teodorczyk) departed the club and were not replaced.

=== Stagnation and new decline: since 2016 ===
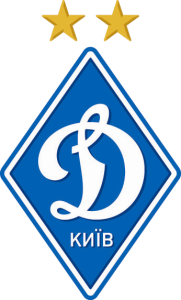
Club logo between 2011 and 2025

The 2016–17 season was a relative disappointment for Dynamo, as the club finished in second place in the 2016–17 Ukrainian Premier League, behind Shakhtar Donetsk, with a difference of 13 points after a string of disappointing results. In the 2016–17 Champions League, the club was drawn in Group B alongside Napoli, Benfica and Beşiktaş J.K. Dynamo finished in fourth place after a dismal campaign, but managed to record a memorable 6–0 win over Beşiktaş in Kyiv. In the winter transfer window, Dynamo signed promising defenders Aleksandar Pantić and Tamás Kádár and focused on youth academy talents such as Viktor Tsyhankov, Artem Besyedin and Volodymyr Shepelyev, managing to improve its performances. Dynamo lost the 2016–17 Ukrainian Cup to Shakhtar Donetsk 0–1 in the final.

For the 2017–18 season, after Serhii Rebrov departed, the club appointed former player Alyaksandr Khatskevich as Rebrov's replacement. In Khatskevich's first two seasons at the helm, Dynamo failed to qualify for the UEFA Champions League group stage, having to settle for the UEFA Europa League group stage instead. Both times they were eventually eliminated in the Round of 16, first by S.S. Lazio (2–4 on aggregate) in 2017–18, and then by Chelsea F.C. (0–8 on aggregate) in 2018–19. Domestically, Dynamo remained firmly in second place behind Shakhtar Donetsk in the Ukrainian Premier League. Despite the apparent lack of progress in the results, Khatskevich was rewarded with a two-year contract extension.

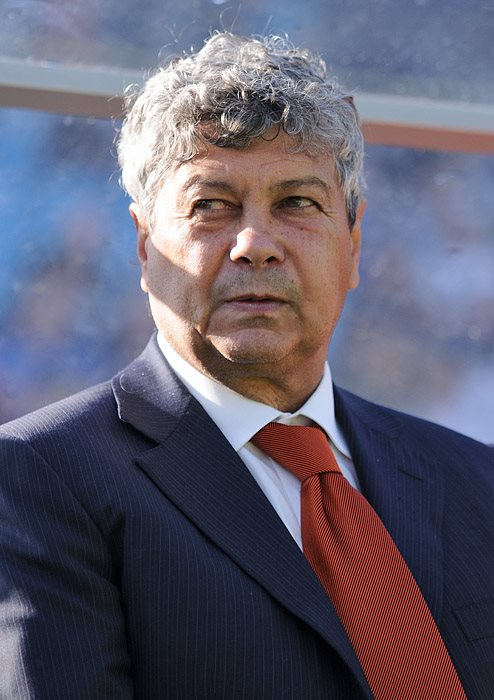
Mircea Lucescu, manager of the team from 2020 to 2023

However, only six matches into his new extension, Khatskevich was fired on 14 August 2019, after once again failing to advance to the UEFA Champions League group stage. Dynamo's Sports Director, Oleksiy Mykhaylychenko, was appointed as manager. Despite the change, the results on the field hardly improved, as Dynamo was eliminated from continental competitions by placing 3rd in Group B of the 2019–20 UEFA Europa League group stage.

On 23 July 2020, Mircea Lucescu became the head coach of Dynamo, signing a two-year contract. Under his leadership, in 2021 the team won the national championship and the Ukrainian Cup, but failed to achieve success during the following two seasons. After Lucescu's resignation in 2023, the post of head coach was taken by former goalkeeper and club legend Oleksandr Shovkovskyi. During his spell, Dynamo won their 17th Ukrainian league title and 30th league title overall in the 2024–2025 season, with the third star being added to the crest, but in late 2025 he was replaced by Ihor Kostyuk. In the 2025–2026 season, the club finished 4th in the Premier League, but qualified to participate in the Europa League by winning the Ukrainian Cup. Kostyuk has been dismissed in 2026, with Maciej Kędziorek taking over as an interim manager.

== Crests and colours ==
Throughout its history, Dynamo has traditionally played in blue-white uniforms, with a short exception during the final years of Soviet period, when the club performed in the national colours of Ukraine. All emblems historically used by Dynamo are based on the logo of the eponymous sports society.

== Honours ==
Each gold star on the Dynamo's emblem represents ten championships.

Dynamo Kyiv has participated in all of the USSR and Ukrainian championships to date, and has won both competitions more times than any other team. The club's best performances were in the 1970s and 1980s, a time in which the Soviet Union national football team was composed mostly of players from the club. Dynamo Kyiv tied the national record for winning three consecutive Soviet Premier League titles in 1966, 1967, and 1968.

Dynamo Kyiv won the UEFA Cup Winners' Cup in 1975 and 1986 as well as the European Super Cup in 1975, after two games against Bayern Munich. In 1977, 1987, and 1999, the club reached the semi-finals of the UEFA Champions League. These victories are associated with the name of Valeriy Lobanovskyi, who played for the club in the 1960s and later became the club's long-term head coach. In 2009 the club reached the semi-final of the UEFA Cup.

Dynamo striker Oleh Blokhin is the Soviet Premier League's all-time top scorer with 211 goals, and has also made more appearances than any other player in the championship's history with 432.

Dynamo Kyiv is also was one of the base clubs of the Soviet Union national football team and many players of the club represented the Soviet Union at international level. After fall of the Soviet Union, Dynamo became the base club of the Ukraine national football team.

Dynamo striker Oleh Blokhin is the Soviet Union national team all-time top scorer with 42 goals, and has also made more appearances than any other player for the team with 112. Two other Dynamo strikers – Oleh Protasov and Viktor Kolotov – are among the Soviet Union national football team top five best scorers with 29 and 22 goals respectively. Two other Dynamo players – Anatoliy Demyanenko and Volodymyr Bezsonov – are among the Soviet Union national football team top five players with most appearances 80 and 79 respectively.

Four former Dynamo's players were appointed as a head coach of the Soviet Union national team, among which Valeriy Lobanovsky, Oleh Bazylevych, Vladimir Salkov and Anatoliy Byshovets. All head coaches of the Ukraine national team but two were at some time former players of Dynamo Kyiv.

=== Ukrainian competitions ===
- Ukrainian Premier League
  - Winners (17, record): 1992–93, 1993–94, 1994–95, 1995–96, 1996–97, 1997–98, 1998–99, 1999–2000, 2000–01, 2002–03, 2003–04, 2006–07, 2008–09, 2014–15, 2015–16, 2020–21, 2024–25
  - Runners-up (13): 1992, 2001–02, 2004–05, 2005–06, 2007–08, 2009–10, 2010–11, 2011–12, 2016–17, 2017–18, 2018–19, 2019–20, 2023–24
- Ukrainian Cup
  - Winners (14): 1992–93, 1995–96, 1997–98, 1998–99, 1999–2000, 2002–03, 2004–05, 2005–06, 2006–07, 2013–14, 2014–15, 2019–20, 2020–21, 2025–26
  - Runners-up (6): 2001–02, 2007–08, 2010–11, 2016–17, 2017–18, 2024–25
- Ukrainian Super Cup
  - Winners (9, record): 2004, 2006, 2007, 2009, 2011, 2016, 2018, 2019, 2020
  - Runners-up (6): 2005, 2008, 2014, 2015, 2017, 2021

=== Soviet competitions ===
- Soviet Top League
  - Winners (13, record): 1961, 1966, 1967, 1968, 1971, 1974, 1975, 1977, 1980, 1981, 1985, 1986, 1990
  - Runners-up (11): 1936 (spring), 1952, 1960, 1965, 1969, 1972, 1973, 1976 (Autumn), 1978, 1982, 1988
- Soviet Cup
  - Winners (9): 1954, 1964, 1966, 1974, 1978, 1982, 1985, 1987, 1990
  - Runners-up (1): 1973
- Soviet Super Cup
  - Winners (3, record): 1981, 1986, 1987
  - Runners-up (1): 1977
- Cup of the Ukrainian SSR
  - Winners (7, record): 1936, 1937, 1938, 1944, 1946, 1947, 1948
  - Runners-up (1): 1945
- Championship of the Proletarian Sports Society Dynamo
  - Winners (3): 1931, 1933, 1935
  - Runners-up (3): 1929, 1932, 1934

=== European competitions ===
- UEFA Cup Winners' Cup (2):

1974–75, 1985–86

- UEFA Super Cup (1):

1975

=== International competitions ===
- Commonwealth of Independent States Cup (4):
  - 1996, 1997, 1998, 2002
- Amsterdam Tournament (1):
  - 1986
- Mohammed V Trophy (1):
  - 1975

=== Friendly competitions ===
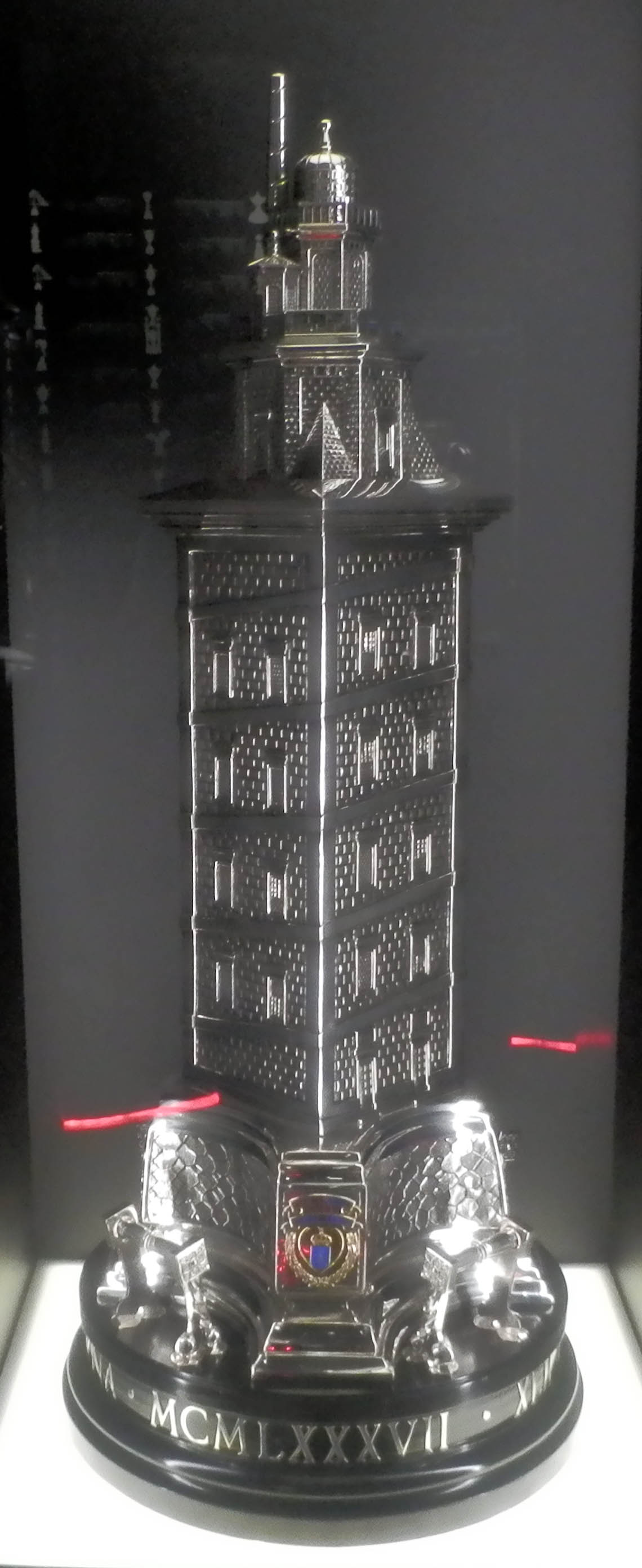
Dynamo Kyiv won the Teresa Herrera Trophy in 1981 and 1982.

- Channel One Cup / United Tournament (2):
  - 2008, 2013

=== Individual player awards ===
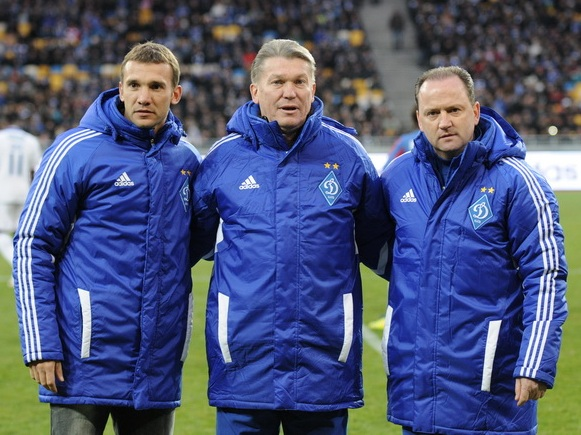
Ballon d'Or winners, former players for FC Dynamo Kyiv Andriy Shevchenko, Oleg Blokhin, and Ihor Belanov

Several players have won individual awards during or for their time with Dynamo Kyiv

European Footballer of the Year (Ballon d'Or)

- Oleg Blokhin (1975)
- Ihor Belanov (1986)

UEFA Golden Player Award

- Oleg Blokhin

FIFA 100

- Andriy Shevchenko

European Championship winners

Two players have won the European Championship whilst at Dynamo Kyiv.

- Yuriy Voynov (France 1960)
- Yury Kovalyov (France 1960)

Ukrainian Footballer of the Year

- Viktor Serebryanikov (1969)
- Volodymyr Muntyan (1970)
- Yevhen Rudakov (1971)
- Oleg Blokhin (1972, 1973, 1974, 1975, 1976, 1977, 1978, 1980, 1981)
- Anatoliy Demyanenko (1982, 1985)
- Oleksandr Zavarov (1986)
- Oleksiy Mykhaylychenko (1987, 1988)
- Volodymyr Bezsonov (1989)
- Sergei Yuran (1990)
- Akhrik Tsveiba (1991)
- Viktor Leonenko (1992, 1993, 1994)
- Yuriy Kalitvintsev (1995)
- Serhii Rebrov (1996, 1998)
- Andriy Shevchenko (1997, 1999)
- Artem Milevskyi (2008, 2009)
- Andriy Yarmolenko (2013, 2014, 2015, 2017)
- Viktor Tsyhankov (2018)

Soviet Footballer of the Year

- Andriy Biba (1966)
- Volodymyr Muntyan (1969)
- Yevhen Rudakov (1971)
- Oleg Blokhin (1973, 1974, 1975)
- Anatoliy Demyanenko (1985)
- Oleksandr Zavarov (1986)
- Oleksiy Mykhaylychenko (1988)

=== Hall of Fame ===
While there is no such institution in the club, it does honor its notables players as "Golden Names", while coaches are honored as "Legendary Mentors".

Golden Names

- Oleh Blokhin
- Andriy Shevchenko
- Ihor Belanov
- Oleh Husyev
- (Belarus) Valyantsin Byalkevich
- Andriy Husin
- Valeriy Lobanovskyi
- Hennadiy Lytovchenko
- Vadym Yevtushenko
- (Uzbekistan) Maksim Shatskikh
- Vladimir Veremeyev
- Mykhailo Fomenko
- Serhii Rebrov
- Volodymyr Troshkin
- Volodymyr Muntyan
- Viktor Kolotov
- Pavlo Vinkovatov
- Valeriy Porkuyan
- Dezyderiy Tovt (Dezso Toth)
- Anatoliy Konkov
- Viktor Chanov
- Vitaliy Holubyev
- Viktor Matviyenko
- Mykola Makhynia
- Mykhaylo Mykhalyna
- Oleh Luzhnyi
- Volodymyr Bezsonov
- Vasyl Rats (László Rácz)
- Oleksandr Zavarov
- Vasyl Turyanchyk
- Mykhaylo Mykhaylov
- Andriy Biba
- Volodymyr Onyshchenko
- Anatoliy Puzach
- Oleksiy Mykhailychenko
- Anatoliy Demyanenko
- Vadym Sosnykhin
- Vitaliy Kosovskyi
- Viktor Zhylin
- Mykola Koltsov
- Leonid Buryak
- (Russia) Konstantin Schegotsky
- Mykhailo Koman
- (Russia) Anatoliy Byshovets
- (Georgia (country)) Andrei Zazroyev
- Viktor Khlus
- Serhiy Fedorov
- Vitaliy Khmelnytskyi
- Oleh Bazylevych
- Viktor Kanevskyi
- Fedir Medvid (Ferenc Medvigy)
- Aleksandr Khapsalis
- Serhiy Krulykovskyi
- Abram Lerman
- Valentyn Troyanovskyi
- Serhiy Zhuravlyov
- Yevhen Rudakov
- Yuriy Voynov
- Viktor Bannikov
- Makar Honcharenko
- Yozhef Sabo (József Szabó)
- Oleh Makarov
- Oleksandr Holovko
- Leonid Ostrovski
- Viktor Fomin
- Serhiy Baltacha
- Ivan Yaremchuk
- Oleh Kuznetsov
- Viktor Serebrianikov
- Petro Slobodyan
- Pavlo Yakovenko
- Andriy Bal
- Stefan Reshko
- Yuriy Romenskyi
- (Russia) Anatoliy Suchkov
- Volodymyr Anufriyenko
- Volodymyr Levchenko
- Volodymyr Shcheholkov
- Yuriy Kalitvintsev

Legendary Mentors

- Valeriy Lobanovskyi
- (Russia) Aleksandr Sevidov
- Oleg Oshenkov
- (Russia) Viktor Maslov
- Vyacheslav Solovyov
- (Russia) Viktor Terentiev
- Oleh Bazylevych

== Grounds ==
=== Stadiums ===
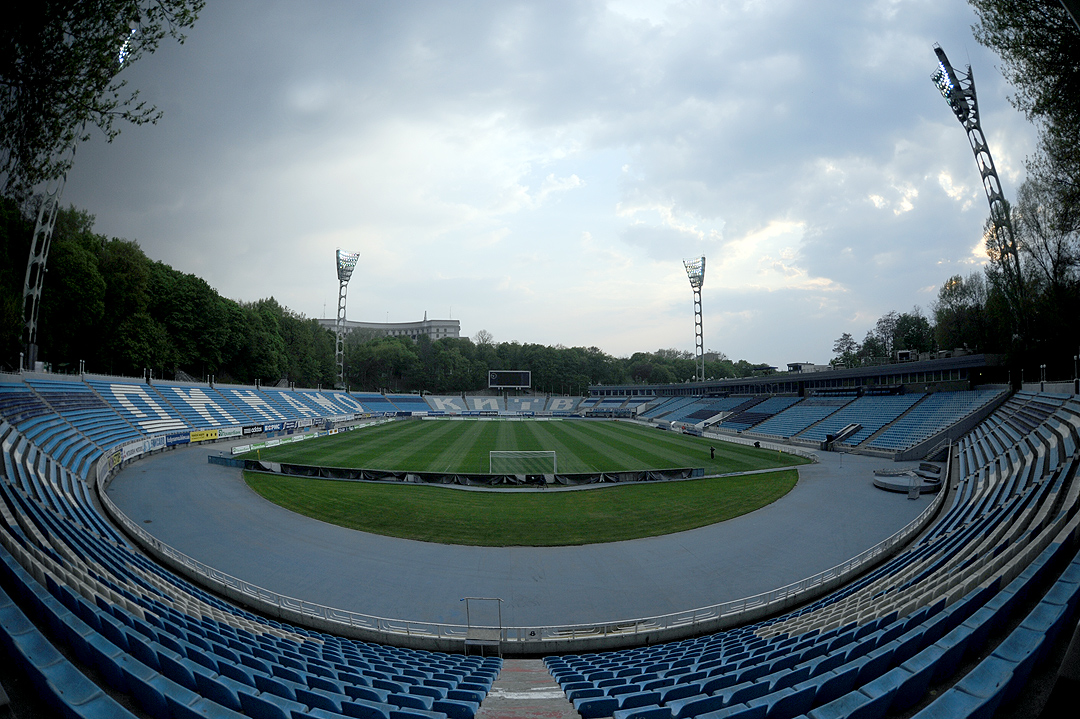
Valeriy Lobanovskyi Dynamo Stadium

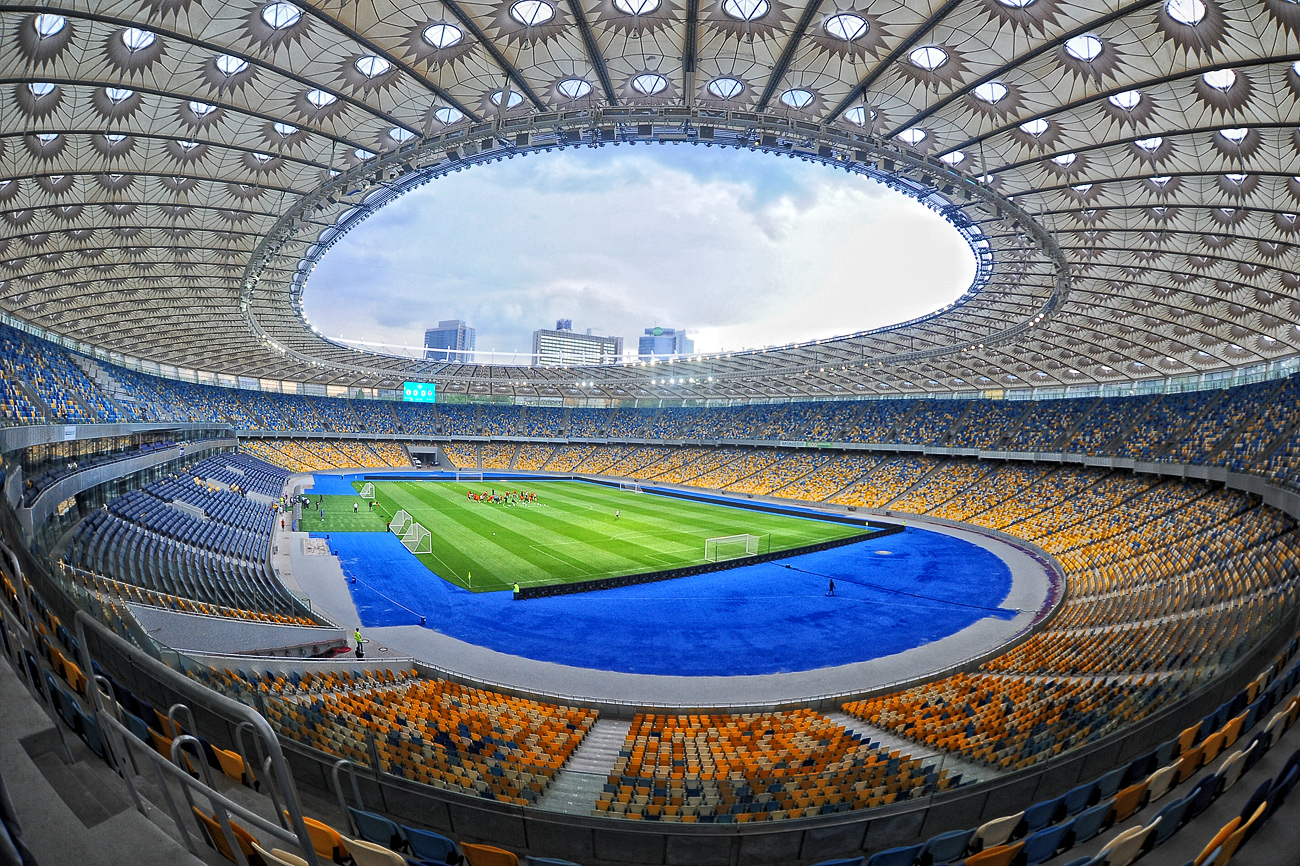
Olimpiyskiy National Sports Complex

The club's home ground, Valeriy Lobanovskyi Dynamo Stadium, is situated in a park located in the centre of the city, close to the Dnieper River bank. The stadium holds 16,873 spectators, and has been the club's home since 1934. When it was built the stadium's capacity was 23,000. After being destroyed in 1941 during World War II, it was rebuilt in 1954. By the end of the 20th century, the stadium was reconstructed as a football-only venue with individual seats. These changes reduced the facility's capacity to its present one. In 2002 after the sudden death of Dynamo's longtime player and coach Valeriy Lobanovskyi, the stadium was renamed in his honour. After NSK Olympiyskiy was closed for reconstruction in 2008, Dynamo also began to play its European games at the Lobanovsky Stadium.

Due to a high demand for European fixtures of the club throughout its European history Dynamo played a majority of their home fixtures at Kyiv's and Ukraine's largest stadium, the Olimpiyskiy National Sports Complex, historically dubbed The Republican Stadium, which held 83,450 spectators. The stadium has been the home of the Ukrainian Cup final since its inaugural game in 1992 and up until 2007. The stadium was closed for a major reconstruction in 2008, after Ukraine and Poland were chosen to host the UEFA Euro 2012. The Olympiysky became Kyiv's main venue as well as the stadium that hosted the final; it also become a UEFA Elite rated stadium.

The team also has a modern-equipped training base in the Kyiv suburb of Koncha-Zaspa. The club maintains its own football school for children and youths, also situated in Kyiv. Junior Dynamo teams are colloquially known as Dynamo-2 and Dynamo-3. Its reserves team -called "double" (дубль) in both Ukrainian and Russian- participates in the national Reserves tournament, where "doubles" of all 16 Vyscha Liga teams compete. Many notable Dynamo Kyiv players progressed through the club's youth system, among them is Andriy Shevchenko, one of the graduates of the school.

=== Home grounds during the war ===
Since 2022, Dynamo Kyiv has been forced to play its UEFA home games outside of Ukraine. For the 2022–23 season, Dynamo started in the UEFA Champions League qualifications playing three games at Władysław Król Municipal Stadium, Łódź (Poland). Later that season, in the UEFA Europa League, it played another three games at Józef Piłsudski Cracovia Stadium, Kraków. For the 2023–24 season, Dynamo played two games at Rapid-Giulești Stadium, Bucharest (Romania). For the 2024–25 season, Dynamo played three games at Arena Lublin, Lublin (Poland). Later that season, in the UEFA Europa League, it played another four games at Volksparkstadion, Hamburg (Germany). For the 2025–26 season, Dynamo returned to Arena Lublin, Lublin (Poland).

=== Reserve, youth and junior teams ===
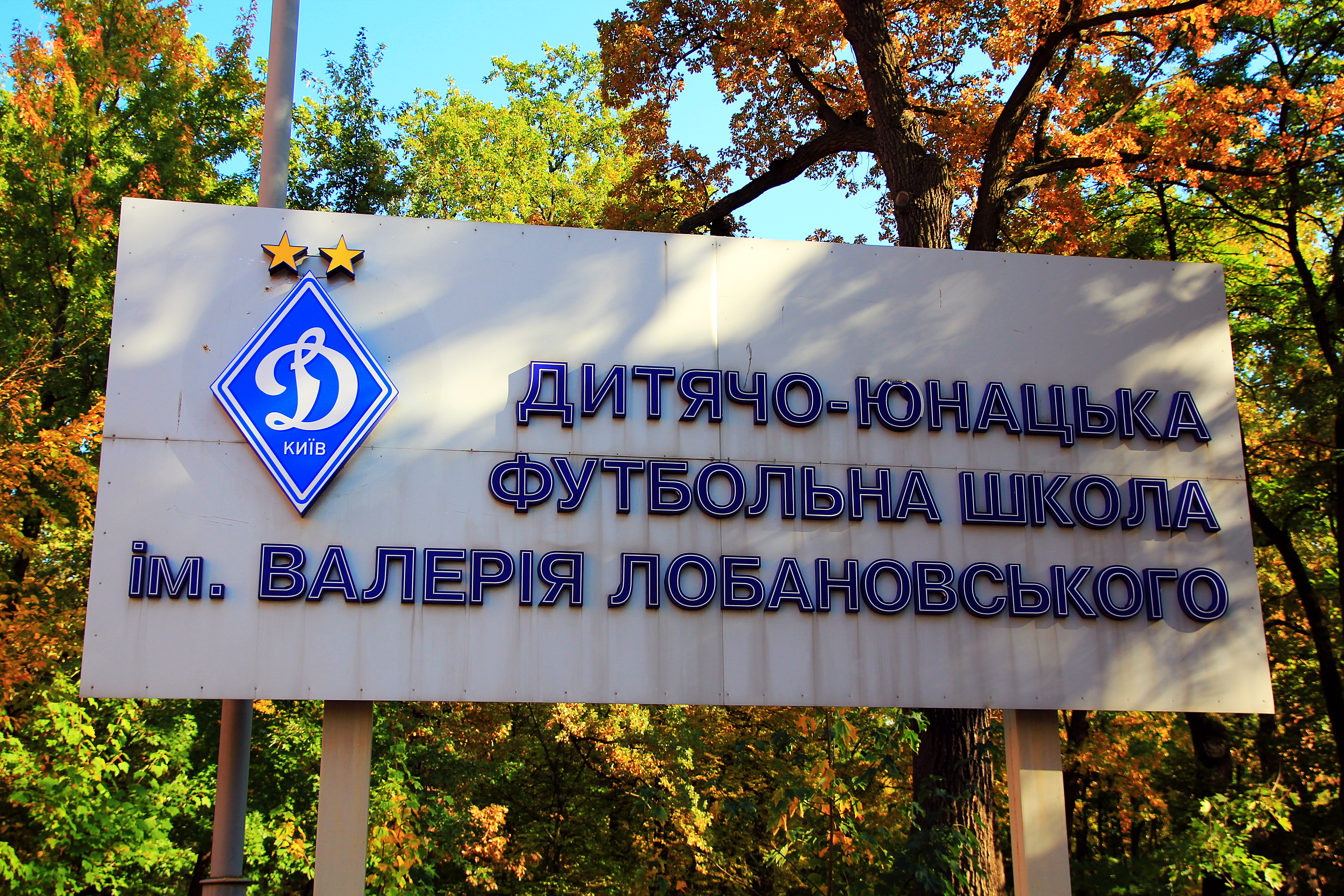
Entrance sign of the football academy at Nyvky

Dynamo Kyiv has several reserve teams. Dynamo reserve teams competed in national competitions since 1946. The club was fielding its reserve team in the Soviet Top League competitions for reserve teams (so called doubles) that existed in 1946–1991. Dynamo doubles team holds a record for number of champion titles of the Soviet Top League for doubles winning it 15 times with a closest pursuing Spartak doubles team trailing with 9 titles. In 2004 the club revived its reserve team which later became youth (U-21) team competing at Ukrainian Premier League competitions for U-21 and U-19 teams. Dynamo football school (academy) fields few teams in Ukrainian Youth Football League as well as Kyiv city football league. Among possibly most exotic football academy graduates is a former Moroccan international Tarik El Jarmouni.

Besides its normal junior squads, FC Dynamo Kyiv also has fielded its second team Dynamo-2 which competed among regular "teams of masters" (Soviet analog of professional teams) as well as republican competitions (amateur level) during the Soviet period. The first time the team participated in football competitions at professional level was in 1964 when it took part in the Soviet Second League (in so called the Ukrainian Soviet football competitions). With dissolution of the Soviet Union in 1991, Dynamo-2 was revived based on the Dynamo's reserve team that participated in the Soviet Top League for doubles. The team continued to play in Ukrainian First League for over 20 years. Along with the second team, Dynamo created also its third team Dynamo-3 which at first played at amateur level and later advanced to Ukrainian Second League. Since 2016, Dynamo has discontinued its numbered team.

==== Reserve team (under-21) honours ====
- Soviet Top League (reserves): 15 (record)
  - 1949, 1963, 1965, 1966, 1968, 1972, 1974, 1976, 1977, 1980, 1981, 1982, 1983, 1985, 1990
- Ukrainian Premier League (reserves / under-21): 6 (record)
  - 2004–05, 2005–06, 2006–07, 2007–08, 2015–16, 2016–17

=== Other departments ===
Since parting from its parent Dynamo society in 1989, Dynamo Kyiv becoming exclusively a football club (other departments were left with the Kyiv city branch of Dynamo–Ukraine) had also its own women team which while not being as successful as the main team, had some degree of success when they were playing first at Soviet and later at Ukrainian competitions. In 1994 the whole women's section was liquidated as the owners of the club lost interest in it.

In 2017 the Ukrainian Association of Football pursued existing mens football clubs to help with the development of women's football in Ukraine and either create own teams or adopt already existing teams of separate women football clubs or sports schools.

In 2021 Dynamo in cooperation with the Kyivan Olympic College reestablished its women football team replacing the college team at the second tier of the two-tier national football pyramid for women and gained promotion the same season.

== Supporters and rivalries ==
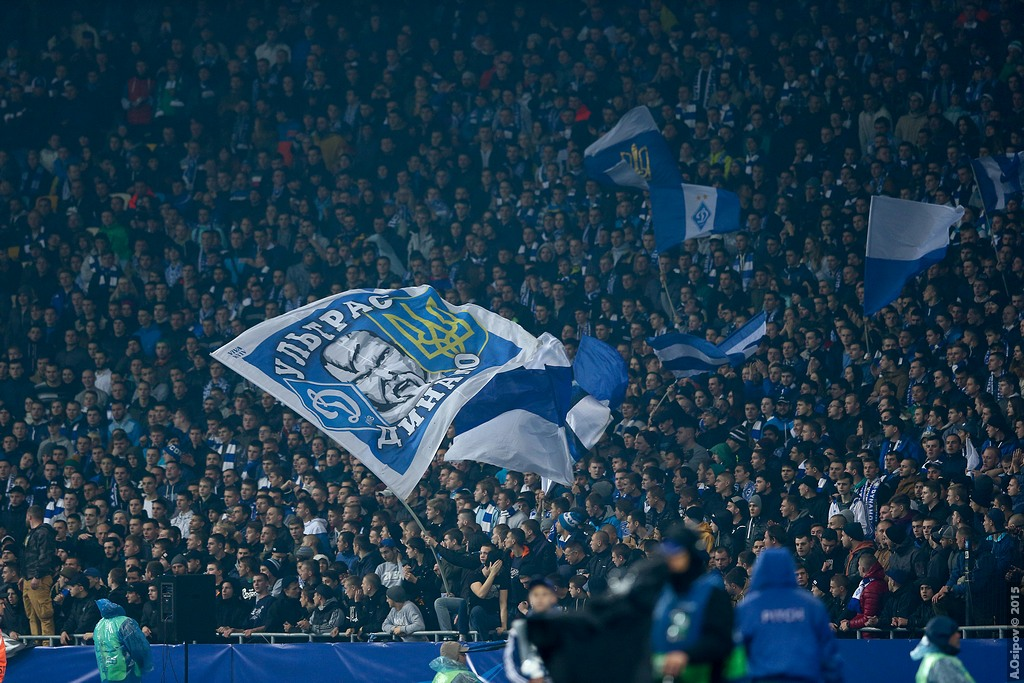
A dynamo flag with Sviatoslav the Brave

The Dynamo fan movement is one of the oldest in Ukraine. Active support began in 1980s during the Soviet period (Ukrainian SSR). Then began to appear first graffiti with the team's logo and was registered one of the biggest fights in the USSR: Dynamo fans against fans of Spartak Moscow in the center of Kyiv. In the 1990s on the stands became popular English style.

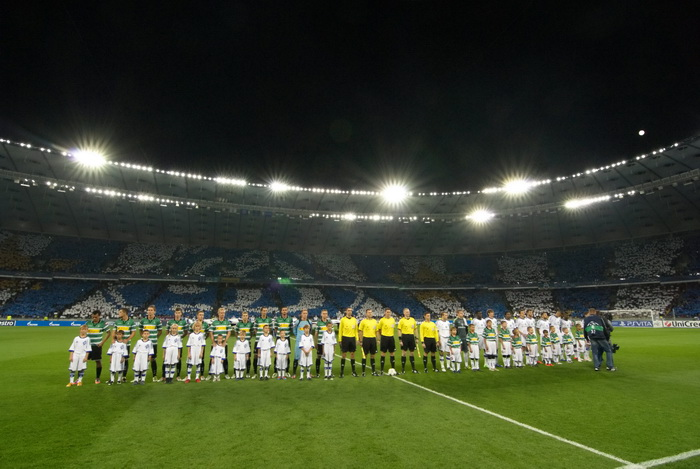
Dynamo Kyiv fans show the team's logo at a match versus Borussia Mönchengladbach.

Historically Dynamo ultras would frequently hold patriotic (Ukrainian nationalism) and strongly anti-communist actions. During the reign of Viktor Yanukovych the ultras had bad relations with the government, caused by persecutions of fans and other political factors. The most publicized action was "Freedom Pavlichenko" (Ukrainian: Волю Павліченкам) in support of political prisoners father and son Pavlichenko. The ultras Dynamo took part in the Independence Day of Ukraine and Heroes Day celebrations.

Dynamo ultras often use the image of Sviatoslav the Brave in the design of their banners. Svyatoslav, a printed magazine of Dynamo ultras, also bears the Kyiv prince's name.

The Ukrainian derby between FC Dynamo and Shakhtar Donetsk is considered to be the most famous football derby in Ukraine, as the fierce rivalry between the two teams is noted to formulate an atmosphere of intensity. Another notable rivalry game is the Kyiv Derby, where Dynamo faces FC Arsenal Kyiv. The rivalry between the two fanbases is heavily driven by their political leanings, as Arsenal fans are associated with anti-fascist and left-wing politics while Dynamo fans are characterized to be strongly natonalist and anti-communist. Dynamo maintains friendly relations with the following fanbases: Karpaty Lviv, Dnipro Dnipropetrovsk (Braty po zbroyi; Band of Brothers), Hutnik Kraków, Zalgiris Vilnius, GNK Dinamo Zagreb, Dinamo Tbilisi, and Stade Rennais F.C.. On the flip side, Dynamo has strained club relations with Shakhtar Donetsk, Chornomorets Odesa, Metalist Kharkiv, Spartak Moscow and Legia Warsaw. However, the outbreak of war in Eastern Ukraine drove all respective club ultras to declare a truce with one another.

== Players ==
=== First team squad ===
As of 4 September 2026

Note: Flags indicate national team as defined under FIFA eligibility rules; some limited exceptions apply. Players may hold more than one non-FIFA nationality.

No.	Pos.	Nation	Player
1	GK	UKR	Heorhiy Bushchan (on loan from Polissya Zhytomyr)
2	DF	UKR	Kostyantyn Vivcharenko
4	DF	UKR	Denys Popov
5	DF	UKR	Oleksiy Sych
6	MF	UKR	Volodymyr Brazhko
7	MF	UKR	Andriy Yarmolenko
8	MF	UKR	Oleksandr Pikhalyonok
9	MF	UKR	Nazar Voloshyn
10	MF	UKR	Mykola Shaparenko
11	FW	UKR	Matviy Ponomarenko
13	DF	UKR	Maksym Korobov
15	MF	UKR	Valentyn Rubchynskyi
16	FW	NGR	Shola Ogundana
18	DF	UKR	Oleksandr Tymchyk
21	MF	SUR	Justin Lonwijk
22	MF	UKR	Vladyslav Kabayev
23	MF	UKR	Navin Malysh
29	MF	UKR	Vitaliy Buyalskyi (captain)

No.	Pos.	Nation	Player
32	DF	UKR	Taras Mykhavko
34	DF	UKR	Vladyslav Zakharchenko
35	GK	UKR	Ruslan Neshcheret
39	FW	PAN	Eduardo Guerrero
40	DF	UKR	Kristian Bilovar
42	MF	CIV	Keasse Bah
43	GK	UKR	Illya Olkhovyi
44	DF	UKR	Vladyslav Dubinchak
47	MF	BRA	Gustavo Prado (on loan from Internacional)
51	GK	UKR	Valentyn Morhun
66	DF	SEN	Aliou Thiaré
70	FW	UKR	Bohdan Redushko
71	GK	UKR	Vyacheslav Surkis
74	GK	UKR	Denys Ihnatenko
91	MF	UKR	Mykola Mykhaylenko
94	DF	POL	Tomasz Kędziora
99	FW	FRA	Pierre Mounguengue

=== Out on loan ===
Note: Flags indicate national team as defined under FIFA eligibility rules; some limited exceptions apply. Players may hold more than one non-FIFA nationality.

No.	Pos.	Nation	Player
—	DF	UKR	Oleksiy Husiev (at Chornomorets Odesa until 30 June 2027)
—	DF	UKR	Oleksandr Syrota (at Amed until 30 June 2026)
45	MF	UKR	Maksym Braharu (at Polissya Zhytomyr until 30 June 2026)
—	MF	UKR	Roman Salenko (at Zorya Luhansk until 30 June 2026)
—	MF	GEO	Aleksandre Peikrishvili (at Gagra until 31 December 2026)

No.	Pos.	Nation	Player
30	MF	SEN	Samba Diallo (at Rukh Lviv until 30 June 2026)
—	FW	VEN	Eric Ramírez (at Carabobo until 31 December 2026)
—	FW	COL	Ángel Torres (at Operário Ferroviário until 30 June 2027)
—	FW	UKR	Andriy Matkevych (at Epitsentr Kamianets-Podilskyi until 30 June 2026)

=== Retired number(s) ===
12 – (Ukraine) Club Supporters (the 12th Man)

== Presidents and other officials ==
=== Presidents ===
- 1927–1989: part of Dynamo, the republican section of Soviet sports society Dynamo
- 1989–1993: Viktor Bezverkhy
- 1993–2002: Hryhoriy Surkis
- 2002–present: Ihor Surkis

=== Vice-Presidents ===
- 2005–2010: Mykhailo Oshenkov (son of Oleg Oshenkov)
- 2005–2010: Vadym Kostiuchenko
- 2018–2020: Yevhen Krasnikov
- 1993–2011: Vitaliy Sivkov

=== General directors ===
- 2007–present: (Georgia (country)) Rezo Chokhonelidze

=== Sports directors ===
- 2011–2019: Oleksiy Mykhailychenko
- 2018–2019: (Spain) Eduardo Docampo
- 2020–2021: Oleksiy Mykhailychenko

=== Technical directors ===
- 1992: Mykhailo Oshenkov (son of Oleg Oshenkov)

== Coaches and administration ==
Administration	Coaching (senior team)	Coaching (U-19 teams)
President – Ihor Surkis; First vice-president – Vitaliy Sivkov; General director – (Georgia (country)) Rezo Chokhonelidze; Sports director – Heorhiy Vorogovskyi; Vice-president – Leonid Ashkenazi; Vice-president – Andriy Madzianovsky; Vice-president – Oleksiy Palamarchuk; Vice-president – Oleksiy Semenenko; Vice-president – Mark Ginsburg	Caretaker head coach – (Poland) Maciej Kędziorek; Assistant coach – (Poland) Daniel Wojtasz; Assistant coach – (Poland) Grzegorz Wojtkowiak; Assistant coach – (Poland) Artur Renkowski; Assistant coach – Anatoliy Bezsmertnyi; Goalkeeping coach – Mykhaylo Fedunov; Goalkeeping coach – Taras Lutsenko; Fitness coach – Vytalii Kulyba; Fitness coach – Serhiy Mkrtchan; Fitness coach – Volodymyr Klymenko	U-19 head coach – Pavlo Cherednichenko (caretaker); U-19 assistant coach – vacant; U-19 goalkeeping coach – Oleksandr Moroz

== Notable coaches ==
- In the Ukrainian championship

The following individuals have all won at least one trophy while coaching Dynamo Kyiv:

Name	Period	Trophies
(Soviet Union) Oleg Oshenkov	1951–1956, 1959	1 domestic cup
(Soviet Union) Vyacheslav Solovyov	1959–1962	1 league title
(Soviet Union) Viktor Maslov	1964–1970	3 league titles, 2 domestic cups
(Soviet Union) Aleksandr Sevidov	1971–1973	1 league title
(Soviet Union) (Ukraine) Valeriy Lobanovskyi	1973–1982, 1984–1990, 1997–2002	12 league titles, 8 domestic cups, 2 UEFA Cup Winners' Cups, 1 UEFA Supercup
(Soviet Union) Anatoliy Puzach	1991–1992	1 league title, 1 domestic cup
(Ukraine) Mykhaylo Fomenko	1993	1 league title, 1 domestic cup
(Ukraine) Yozhef Sabo	1992, 1994, 1995–1996, 2004–2005, 2007	2 league titles, 2 domestic cups
(Ukraine) Mykola Pavlov	1995	1 league title
(Ukraine) Oleksiy Mykhaylychenko	2002–2004, 2019–2020	2 league titles, 2 domestic cup, 1 super cup
(Ukraine) Anatoliy Demyanenko	2005–2007	1 league title, 2 domestic cups, 2 super cups
(Russia) Yuri Semin	2008–2009, 2011–2012	1 league title, 1 super cup
(Russia) Valery Gazzaev	2009–2010	1 super cup
(Ukraine) Serhiy Rebrov	2014–2017	2 league titles, 2 domestic cups, 1 super cup
(Belarus) Alyaksandr Khatskevich	2017–2019	2 super cups
(Romania) Mircea Lucescu	2020–2023	1 league title, 1 domestic cup, 1 super cup
(Ukraine) Oleksandr Shovkovskyi	2023–2025	1 league title

== Club records and statistics ==
Oleksandr Shovkovskyi currently holds Dynamo's official appearance record, having made 637 appearances in all competitions, over the course of 17 seasons from 1993 until 2016. He also holds the record for Ukrainian Premier League (Vyshcha Liha) appearances with 426, while Oleg Blokhin remains unreachable for Soviet Top League appearances with 432.

Including all competitions, Oleg Blokhin is the all-time leading goalscorer for Dynamo with 266 goals since joining the club in 1969, 211 of which were scored in Soviet Top League (another Dynamo record). Serhiy Rebrov, who is the all-time topscorer for Ukrainian Premier League, comes in second in all competitions with 163.

Dynamo Kyiv qualified for continental competitions for the last 32 years since 1990 and missed only twice (two seasons) since 1973.

=== Divisional movements ===
Tier	Years	Last	Promotions	Relegations
Top League (tier 1)	54	1991	22 times to Europe	never
56 years of professional football in Soviet Union since 1936

Tier	Years	Last	Promotions	Relegations
Premier League (tier 1)	31	2021–22	30 times to Europe	never
31 years of professional national football in Ukraine since 1992

== Dynamo Kyiv in European competitions ==
Dynamo Kyiv made a forceful entrance into European competitions in the 1965–66 European Cup Winners' Cup, advancing into the quarter-finals before losing to Celtic. The club is a regular visitor to UEFA competitions, having participated in over 50 tournaments. Dynamo Kyiv has not missed a single season of European competition since 1990 and, since 1973, has only missed out twice (1984–85 and 1988–89). During the Soviet era, the club won the European Cup Winners' Cup twice, in 1975 and 1986, the 1975 European Super Cup and reached the semi-finals of the European Cup/Champions League three times, once under the Ukrainian banner.

=== European finals ===
Year	Competition	Opposing team	Score	Venue
1975	European Cup Winners' Cup	(Hungary) Ferencváros	3–0	(Switzerland) St. Jakob Stadium, Basel
1975	European Super Cup	(West Germany) Bayern Munich	1–0, 2–0	Two-legged
1986	European Cup Winners' Cup	(Spain) Atlético Madrid	3–0	(France) Stade de Gerland, Lyon
1986	European Super Cup	(Romania) Steaua Bucharest	0–1	Stade Louis II, Monaco

=== UEFA club coefficient ranking ===
As of 13 June 2026

Rank	Team	Points
121	(France) Nantes	13.016
122	(Belgium) Cercle Brugge	12.750
123	(Ukraine) Dynamo Kyiv	12.500
124	(Norway) Brann	12.250
125	(Kosovo) Dritta	12.125

=== UEFA Rankings since 2004 ===
Season	Ranking	Movement	Points	Change
2025–26	123	▼ -53	12.500	▼ –11.000
2024–25	70	▼ -2	23.500	▼ –3.000
2023–24	68	▼ –9	26.500	▼ -8.500
2022–23	59	▼ –20	35.000	▼ –9.000
2021–22	39	▼ –8	44.000	▼ –3.000
2020–21	31	▼ –5	47.000	▼ –8.000
2019–20	26	▼ –2	55.000	▼ –10.000
2018–19	23	0	65.000	▲ +3.000
2017–18	23	▲ +2	62.000	new points system
2016–17	25	▲ +1	67.526	▲ +1.550
2015–16	26	▲ +1	65.976	▲ +0.943
2014–15	27	▲ +7	65.033	▲ +8.840
2013–14	34	▼ –9	56.193	▼ –12.958
2012–13	25	▲ +6	68.951	▲ +6.925
2011–12	31	▼ –1	62.026	▲ +1.250
2010–11	30	▲ +14	60.776	▲ +17.866
2009–10	44	▼ –3	42.910	▼ –3.460
2008–09	41	▲ +33	46.370	▲ +11.438
2007–08	74	▼ –13	34.932	▲ +5.932
2006–07	61	▲ +2	29.000	▲ +1.000
2005–06	63	▼ –12	28.000	▼ –4.000
2004–05	51	0	32.000	0.000

=== Football Club Elo ranking ===
As of 16 August 2026

Rank	Team	Points
358	(Sweden) Sirius	1569
359	(United States) FC Dallas	1569
360	(Argentina) CA Temperley	1569
361	(Ukraine) Dynamo Kyiv	1569
362	(Norway) Tromsø	1568
363	(Chile) CD Ñublense	1568
364	(England) Derby County	1567

== Player records ==
=== Top goalscorers ===
As of 14 December 2025

#	Name	Years	League	Cup	Europe	Other	Total
1	(Soviet Union) Oleg Blokhin	1969–1987	211	29	26	0	266
2	(Ukraine) Serhiy Rebrov	1992–2000; 2005–2007	113	19	31	0	163
3	(Ukraine) Andriy Yarmolenko	2007–2017 2023–	116	21	24	0	161
4	(Uzbekistan) Maksim Shatskikh	1999–2008	97	22	23	0	142
5	(Ukraine) Andriy Shevchenko	1994–1999; 2009–2012	83	16	25	0	124
6	(Ukraine) Oleh Husiev	2003–2016; 2017–2018	57	15	22	2	96
7	(Ukraine) Victor Tsyhankov	2016–2023	77	4	13	0	94
8	(Ukraine) Artem Milevskyi	2002–2013	57	11	16	3	87
9	(Ukraine) Vitaliy Buyalskyi	2012–	69	1	16	1	87
10	(Soviet Union) Viktor Kanevskyi	1973–1984	56	12	14	0	82

- Other – National Super Cup

=== Most appearances ===
As of 14 December 2025

#	Name	Years	League	Cup	Europe	Other	Total
1	(Ukraine) Oleksandr Shovkovskyi	1993–2016	426	58	144	9	637
2	(Soviet Union) Oleg Blokhin	1969–1987	432	67	79	3	581
3	(Ukraine) Oleh Husiev	2003–2016; 2017–2018	295	43	98	6	442
4	(Ukraine) Anatoliy Demyanenko	1979–1990; 1992–1993	347	47	43	2	439
5	(Ukraine) Andriy Yarmolenko	2007–2017; 2023–	275	32	99	6	412
6	(Soviet Union) Leonid Buryak	1973–1984	304	52	51	2	409
7	(Soviet Union) Volodymyr Veremeyev	1968–1982	310	45	44	2	401
8	(Ukraine) Vitaliy Buyalskyi	2012–	253	27	95	6	381
9	(Soviet Union) Volodymyr Muntyan	1965–1977	302	34	35	0	371
10	(Soviet Union) Volodymyr Bezsonov	1976–1990	278	48	39	3	368

- Other – National Super Cup

== Scandals ==
=== FootballLeaks-2 ===
German journalists from Der Spiegel Rafael Buschmann and Michael Wulzinger published a book titled Football Leaks – 2.

A separate part titled "Ukrainische Bruderschaft" (Ukrainian Brotherhood) describes brothers Ihor and Hryhorii Surkis's activities in the football sphere and their relation to the "Newport" offshore. All FC "Dynamo's" activities are financed by this company. The authors refer to Football Leaks documents.

The book tells that starting from 1993, all the financial activities of Kyiv-based FC Dynamo have been performed via the company Newport, controlled by the club's boss Ihor Surkis. Having cited the FIFA data, the authors noted that in 2011–2017 the Newport has spent US$324 million to buy 82 players for FC Dynamo. The taxes from this sum haven't been paid in Ukraine.

== See also ==
- FC Dynamo-2 Kyiv
- FC Dynamo-3 Kyiv
