= Vitaliy Holubyev =

Soviet footballer (1926–1991)

Personal information
- Date of birth: 19 March 1926
- Place of birth: Moscow, USSR
- Date of death: 25 March 1991 (aged 65)
- Position: Defender

Senior career*
Years	Team	Apps	(Gls)
1946–1948	FC Dynamo Luhansk		
1948–1950	DO Kiev		
1951–1959	FC Dynamo Kyiv	158	(0)
1960	FC Dynamo Khmelnytskyi	6	(0)
1960	FC Lokomotiv Vinnytsia	13	(0)
1961	FC Avanhard Sumy		

International career
1956	Ukraine	3	(0)
1955	USSR (unofficial)	1	(0)
- * Club domestic league appearances and goals

Vitaliy Holubyev (19 March 1926 – 25 March 1991) was an association footballer from the former Soviet Union who played for FC Dynamo Kyiv.

In 1956 Holubyev played couple of games for Ukraine at the Spartakiad of the Peoples of the USSR.
