= Aleksandr Sevidov =

Soviet footballer

Personal information
- Full name: Aleksandr Aleksandrovich Sevidov
- Date of birth: 5 September 1921
- Place of birth: Moscow, Russian SFSR, Soviet Union
- Date of death: 15 April 1992 (aged 70)
- Place of death: Moscow, Russia
- Position: Forward

Youth career
- 1936–1938: Start Moscow

Senior career*
Years	Team	Apps	(Gls)
1939	Dynamo Kazan	15	(8)
1940	FC Pishchevik Moscow	22	(10)
1941	Dinamo Minsk	7	(1)
1945	FC Krylia Sovetov Moscow]	16	(10)
1946–1948	Torpedo Moscow	6	(2)

Managerial career
- 1954–1957: Trud Stupino
- 1958–1960: Moldova Kishinyov
- 1961: FShM Moscow
- 1962–1969: Dinamo Minsk
- 1970: Kairat
- 1971–1973: Dynamo Kyiv
- 1974: FShM Moscow
- 1975–1979: Dynamo Moscow
- 1981–1982: Lokomotiv Moscow
- 1983–1985: Dynamo Moscow
- 1987: Neftchi Baku
- 1989–1990: Rotor Volgograd
- * Club domestic league appearances and goals

Aleksandr Aleksandrovich Sevidov (Russian: Александр Александрович Севидов; 5 September 1921 – 15 April 1992) was a Soviet professional football coach and player. As a player, he made his professional debut in the Soviet First League in 1939 for FC Dynamo Kazan.

== Honours as a coach ==
- Soviet Top League champion: 1971, 1976 (spring).
- Soviet Top League runner-up: 1972, 1973.
- Soviet Top League bronze: 1963, 1975.
- Soviet Cup winner: 1977, 1984.
- Soviet Cup finalist: 1965, 1973.
- UEFA Cup Winners' Cup semifinalist: 1978, 1985.
