= Dynamo (Ukraine) =

Sports club in Ukraine

The logo of the society

The Dynamo wordmark: Динамо in handwritten Cyrillic

Dynamo flag

Physical culture and sports association "Dynamo" - Ukraine (Ukrainian: ФСТ «Динамо» України, romanized: FST "Dynamo" Ukrayiny) or Dynamo - Ukraine (Ukrainian: Динамо Україна) is a sports club that was established in the Soviet Union as part of the Soviet sports society "Dynamo". It was created on October 31, 1924, in Kharkiv. Since that time, the sports club has stayed as one of the best clubs in Ukraine after the fall of the Soviet Union.

Among the six existing sports associations in Ukraine, Dynamo can be considered the leading. At the 2012 Summer Olympics, out of 245 sportspeople of Ukraine, 125 represented Dynamo. Eighty-two sportspeople represented law enforcement agencies. Forty-one out of 125 athletes were from the city of Kyiv and Donetsk Oblast. Dynamo's members were honorary national banner carriers for the opening and closing ceremonies.

== History ==
The association was established at the constituent conference of delegates from law enforcement agencies, state security, border protection, and internal troops that took place in Kharkiv on October 31, 1924. Initially, Dynamo Kharkiv was sponsored by the Kharkiv factory "Serp i Molot" (Sickle and Mallet) that was recently nationalized and renamed from Gelferikh-Sade (Russian: Гельферих-Саде). The headquarters of the FST Dynamo became the Illich club at vulytsia Radnarkomivska.

The Kyiv club of Dynamo was initially sponsored by the Bolshevik factory (former "Greter and Krivanek"). On December 11, 1926, Dynamo Vinnytsia was established.

During the years of independence, from 1994 to 2010, 455 sportspeople represented Dynamo at the Olympics and earned 63 different medals (18 gold, 18 silver, 27 bronze). Overall, since 1952, the association was represented by 608 athletes, 142 of whom earned 164 medals (49 gold, 49 silver, 66 bronze).

== Regional organizations ==
- Vinnytsia Oblast
  - Established on 4 March 1925 at Podolia GKV, GPU division (State Political Directorate)
  - Specialized disciplines include: Shooting, Canoeing and Kayaking, Canoe slalom, Greco-Roman wrestling, Freestyle wrestling, Sumo, Sambo wrestling, Unifight, Association football
  - website: http://vndynamo.com/

== Olympic laureates ==
=== 1956 Summer Olympics ===
- Mikhail Shakhov, Kyiv (wrestling)

=== 1968 Summer Olympics ===
- Aleksei Barkalov, Kharkiv / Kyiv (water polo)

=== 1972 Summer Olympics ===
- Mykola Avilov, Odesa (decathlon)
- Yakov Zheleznyak, Odesa (shooting)
- Volodymyr Semenets, Volsk (Saratov Oblast) (cycling)
- Aleksei Barkalov, Kharkiv / Kyiv (water polo)
- Kateryna Koryshko, Hadiach Raion (Poltava Oblast) (canoeing)
- Valeriy Borzov, Kyiv (athletics)
- Valeriy Borzov, Kyiv (athletics)
- Valeriy Borzov, Kyiv (athletics)

=== 1976 Summer Olympics ===
- Nataliya Klymova, Kyiv (basketball)
- Serhiy Novikov, Moscow (judo)
- Serhiy Nahorniy, Khmelnytskyi (canoeing)
- Petro Korol, Lviv (weightlifting)
- Serhiy Nahorniy, Khmelnytskyi (canoeing)
- Mykola Avilov, Odesa (decathlon)
- Valeriy Borzov, Kyiv (athletics)
- Valeriy Borzov, Kyiv (athletics)

=== 1980 Summer Olympics ===
- Aleksei Barkalov, Kharkiv / Kyiv (water polo)

== Sports clubs ==
- (football) FC Dynamo Kyiv (no longer affiliated), Dynamo Kyiv (women)
- (hockey) HC Sokil Kyiv (no longer affiliated)

== Olympic centers ==
- Sports base "Dynamo", Feodosia
- Palace of Sports "Dynamo", Donetsk
- Fitness recreational complex "Dynamo", Zhytomyr
- Sports base "Dynamo", Slavske (Lviv Oblast)
- Sports complex "Dynamo", Lviv
- Ski base, Tokari (Sumy Raion)
- Sports complex "Dynamo", Kharkiv Oblast
- Archery sports base "Dynamo", Nova Kakhovka
