= Vitaliy Sobolev =

Soviet footballer

Personal information
- Date of birth: 25 January 1930
- Date of death: 1995 (aged 64–65)
- Place of death: Kyiv, Ukraine
- Position: Defender

Senior career*
Years	Team	Apps	(Gls)
1953	Shakhtar Stalino	2	(0)
1954	CDKA Moscow		
1955	ODO Kiev	23	(0)
1956–1959	Dynamo Kyiv	28	(0)
1959	ODO Kiev		
1960	Sudobudivnyk Mykolaiv	28	(0)

International career
1956	Ukraine	1	(0)

Managerial career
- 1963–1964: Avanhard Chernivtsi
- * Club domestic league appearances and goals

Vitaliy Sobolev (25 January 1930 – 1995) was a footballer from the former Soviet Union who played for FC Dynamo Kyiv.

In 1956 Sobolev played a game for the Ukraine national team at the Spartakiad of the Peoples of the USSR.
