= Rezo Chokhonelidze =

Georgian footballer (born 1948)

Rezo Chohonelidze
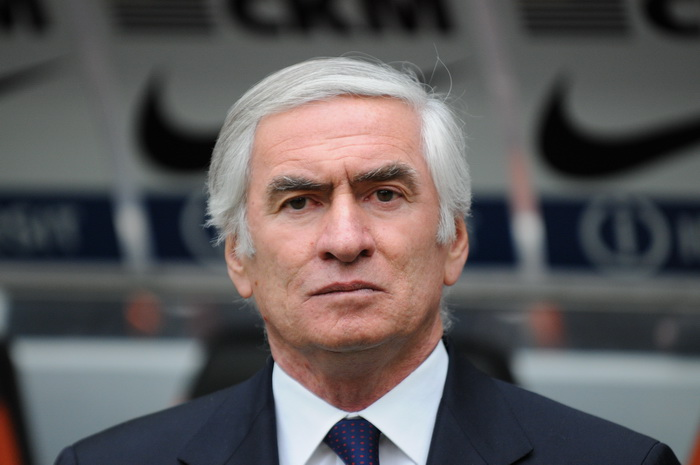

Personal information
- Full name: Revaz Chokhonelidze
- Date of birth: 6 May 1948 (age 78)
- Place of birth: Kutaisi, Georgian SSR
- Height: 1.74 m (5 ft 9 in)
- Position: Defender

Senior career*
Years	Team	Apps	(Gls)
1965–1969	Dinamo Tbilisi	17	(0)
1970–1976	Torpedo Kutaisi	234	(8)
1977–1982	Dynamo Saint Petersburg	214	(1)
- * Club domestic league appearances and goals

Revaz Chokhonelidze (Georgian: რეზო ჭოხონელიძე; born 6 May 1948) is a Georgian football manager and former footballer who is the director of Dynamo (Kyiv).

== Early life ==
Chokhonelidze is a native of Kutaisi, Georgia.

== Playing career ==
In 1977 Chokhonelidze signed for Dynamo Saint Petersburg where he captained the club.

== Managerial career ==
After retiring from professional football, Chokhonelidze attended football manager school in Italy. He then worked for Italian Serie A side Milan, where he played a role in the club signing Ukraine international Andriy Shevchenko and Georgia international Kakha Kaladze.

== Personal life ==
Chokhonelidze is nicknamed "Rezo".
