= Ernest Yust =

Soviet association footballer (1927–1992)

Personal information
- Date of birth: June 17, 1927
- Place of birth: Uzhhorod, Czechoslovakia
- Date of death: April 21, 1992 (aged 64)
- Place of death: Pécs, Hungary

Senior career*
Years	Team	Apps	(Gls)
1947–1948	Spartak Uzhhorod		
1949–1957	Dynamo Kyiv	123	(1)
1959–1960	Spartak Uzhhorod	32	(0)

Managerial career
- 1960–1961: Verkhovyna Uzhhorod
- 1969–1972: Karpaty Lviv
- 1974–1978: Karpaty Lviv
- * Club domestic league appearances and goals

Ernest Yust (Hungarian: Ernő Juszt, Ukrainian: Ернест Юст; 1927–1992) was a Soviet and Hungarian football player and later Soviet coach.

== Overview ==
Native of Užhorod, Czechoslovakia, Yust started his football career in the Kingdom of Hungary after it annexed territories of Czechoslovakia following the 1938 First Vienna Award which included the city of Užhorod/Ungvar.

From 1940 to 1946 played for Ungvari AC (УАК) (Ungvar, today Uzhhorod), 1947/1948 and 1959/1960 for Spartak Uzhgorod, from 1949 to 1958 — for Dynamo Kyiv. With Dynamo Kyiv he won USSR Cup in 1954 and silver medal in USSR Championship in 1952. In Soviet Premier League played 123 matches, scored 1 goal.

In 1956 Yust played couple of games for Ukraine at the Spartakiad of the Peoples of the USSR.

He was of the most prominent coaches in Karpaty Lviv's history — he won USSR Cup in 1969, played in UEFA Cup Winners' Cup, and brought Karpaty to Soviet Top League, where it finished 4th two times - 1976 (spring) and 1976 (autumn) - that has been the biggest achievement in Karpaty' history.

== Titles ==
=== As player ===
- USSR Cup: 1954 (Dinamo Kiev)

=== As head coach (manager) ===
- USSR Cup: 1969 (Karpaty Lviv)

== Legacy ==
Starting from 2000, the Lviv Association of Football (Lviv Oblast Football Federation) organizes an annual competition named "Memorial Ernesta Yusta".
