= Mykola Koltsov =

Soviet footballer

Personal information
- Full name: Mykola Mykhaylovych Koltsov
- Date of birth: 11 May 1936
- Place of birth: Voronezh, RSFSR
- Date of death: 27 December 2011 (aged 75)
- Place of death: Kharkiv, Ukraine
- Position: Defender

Youth career
- 1951–1957: FC Krylia Sovetov Kuybyshev

Senior career*
Years	Team	Apps	(Gls)
1957–1960	FC Krylia Sovetov Kuybyshev	95	(0)
1961–1963	FC Dynamo Kyiv	44	(0)
1963–1966	FC Avanhard Kharkiv	89	(2)
1967	FC Zirka Kirovohrad	33	(0)

Managerial career
- 1967–1970: FC Avanhard Kharkiv (ass't)
- * Club domestic league appearances and goals

Mykola Koltsov (Ukrainian: Микола Михайлович Кольцов; 11 May 1936 – 27 December 2011) was a Soviet footballer and Ukrainian football children and youth trainer.

Koltsov also was decorated by the President of Ukraine only one month before his death. He died in Kharkiv, aged 75.

== Honours ==
=== As player ===
- Soviet Top League (with Dynamo Kyiv)

- Champion (1): 1961
