= Stefan Reshko =

Ukrainian footballer

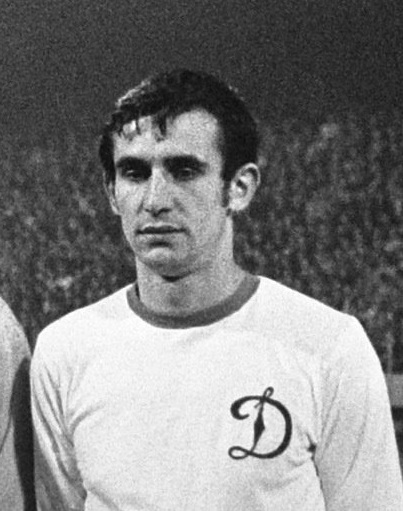
- Stefan Reshko in 1975

Personal information
- Full name: Stefan Mykhaylovych Reshko
- Date of birth: 24 March 1947 (age 79)
- Place of birth: Kliucharky, Zakarpattia Oblast, Ukrainian SSR
- Height: 1.82 m (6 ft 0 in)
- Position: Defender

Senior career*
Years	Team	Apps	(Gls)
1965–1966	Verkhovyna Uzhhorod		
1967–1968	Lokomotyv Vinnytsia		
1968–1970	Chornomorets Odesa		
1971–1978	Dynamo Kyiv		

International career
1975–1976	Soviet Union	15	(0)
- * Club domestic league appearances and goals

Olympic medal record

Representing Soviet Union

Men's Football
Bronze medal – third place	1976 Montreal	Team competition

Stefan Mykhaylovych Reshko (Ukrainian: Стефан Михайлович Решко; born 24 March 1947) is a Ukrainian and Soviet former professional footballer.
