= Oleh Makarov (footballer) =

Soviet footballer and coach (1929–1995)

Personal information
- Full name: Oleh Oleksandrovych Makarov
- Date of birth: July 26, 1929
- Place of birth: Rubtsovsk, Russian SFSR, Soviet Union
- Date of death: November 8, 1995 (aged 66)
- Place of death: Kyiv, Ukraine
- Height: 1.78 m (5 ft 10 in)
- Position: Goalkeeper

Youth career
- Lokomotiv Kuibyshev
- Pishchevik Odessa

Senior career*
Years	Team	Apps	(Gls)
1947	Pishchevik Odessa		
1948–1963	FC Dynamo Kyiv	208	(0)

International career
1956	Ukraine	2	(-4)
1957	USSR	1	(-1)

Managerial career
- 1964: FC Dynamo Kyiv (assistant)
- 1965: FC Dynamo-2 Kyiv
- 1966: FC Lokomotiv Vinnytsia
- * Club domestic league appearances and goals

Oleh Oleksandrovych Makarov (Ukrainian: Олег Олександрович Макаров, Russian: Олег Александрович Макаров; July 26, 1929 – November 8, 1995) was a Ukrainian and Soviet football player, coach, and sports writer.

== Honours ==
- Soviet Top League winner: 1961.
- Soviet Cup winner: 1954.

== International career ==
Makarov played his only game for the USSR on July 27, 1957, in a 1958 FIFA World Cup qualifier against Finland.

In 1956 Makarov played couple of games for Ukraine at the Spartakiad of the Peoples of the USSR.

== Bibliography ==
- Makarov, O. Vratar (Goalie). "Radyanskyi pysmenyk". Kyiv, 1963.
