= Tiberiy Popovich =

Ukrainian footballer (1930–2008)

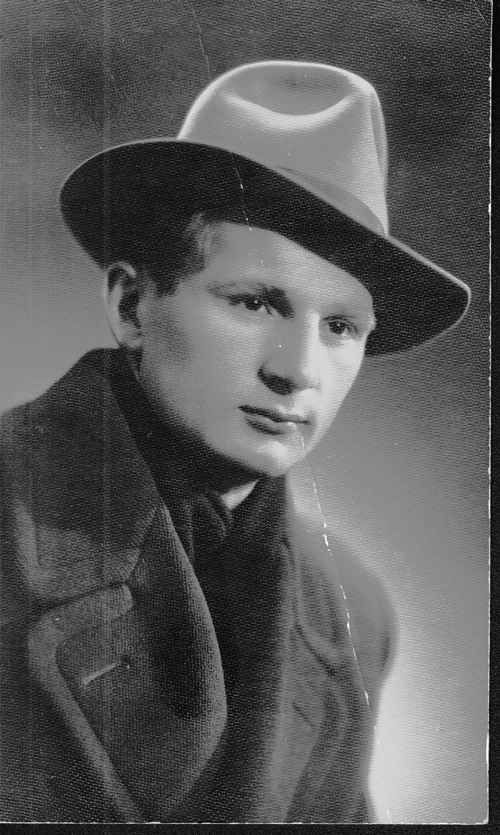

Personal information
- Date of birth: 20 September 1930
- Place of birth: Mukaczewo, Czechoslovakia
- Date of death: 10 February 2008 (aged 77)
- Place of death: Mukacheve, Ukraine
- Position: Defender

Senior career*
Years	Team	Apps	(Gls)
1948	Bolshevik Mukachevo		
1949	FC Dynamo Mukachevo		
1950	FC Dynamo Moscow	0	(0)
1951–1959	FC Dynamo Kyiv	121	(4)
1959–1961	FC Kolhospnyk Rivne	75	(2)

International career
1956	Ukraine	3	(0)
- * Club domestic league appearances and goals

Tiberiy Popovich (originally Hungarian: Tibor Popovics, Ukrainian: Тиберій Ладиславович Попович, romanized: Tyberiy Ladyslavovych Popovych; 20 September 1930 – 10 February 2008) was an association footballer from the former Soviet Union who played for FC Dynamo Kyiv.

In 1956 Popovich played couple of games for Ukraine at the Spartakiad of the Peoples of the USSR.
