= Viktor Terentiev =

Soviet footballer

Personal information
- Date of birth: 16 December 1924
- Place of birth: Moscow, Soviet Union
- Date of death: 14 February 2004 (aged 79)
- Place of death: Moscow, Russian Federation
- Position: Forward

Senior career*
Years	Team	Apps	(Gls)
1945	FC Dynamo Ivanovo		
1947	FC Pishchevik Moscow		
1948–1953	FC Spartak Moscow	103	(34)
1953	FC Spartak Kalinin		(3)
1954–1957	FC Dynamo Kyiv	67	(18)
1958	FC Metalurh Zaporizhia	26	(7)

International career
1956	Ukraine	2	(2)

Managerial career
- 1963: FC Dynamo Kyiv (USSR (Olymp), assist)
- 1970: FC Dynamo Kyiv
- 1972: FC Metalist Kharkiv
- 1974: FC Dynamo Bryansk
- 1982–1984: FC Dynamo Kashyra
- * Club domestic league appearances and goals

Viktor Terentiev (16 December 1924 – 14 February 2004) was an association footballer from the former Soviet Union who played for FC Dynamo Kyiv and FC Spartak Moscow.

In 1956 Terentiev played couple of games for Ukraine at the Spartakiad of the Peoples of the USSR.
