= Khabarovsk Oblast =

Administrative division of Russian Soviet Federative Socialist Republic (1934–1939)

Khabarovsk Oblast Хабаровская область
- Oblast of the Soviet Union
- 1934–1939
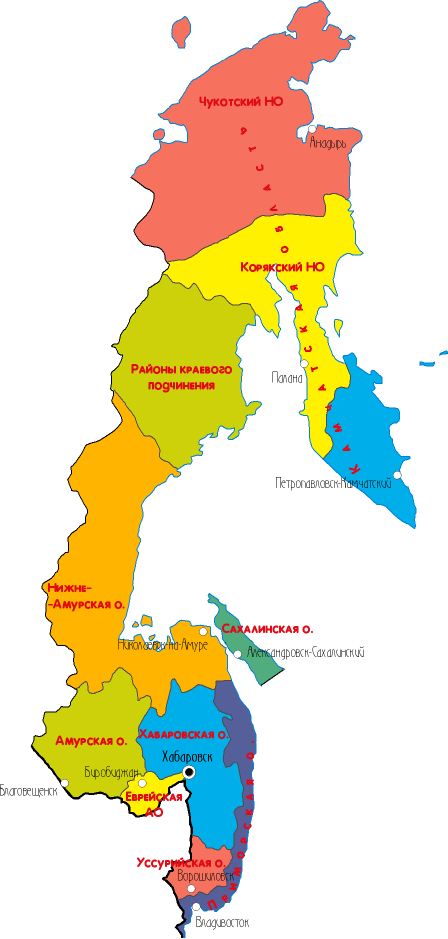
- Far Eastern Krai, 1938
- Capital: Khabarovsk
- Area
  - 1934: 224,850 km^{2} (86,820 sq mi)
- Population
  - 1934: 264,000
- History
  - Established: 22 July 1934
  - Disestablished: 26 May 1939
- Today part of: Russia

Khabarovsk Oblast (Russian: Хабаровская область) was an administrative division (an oblast) of the Russian Soviet Federative Socialist Republic which existed between 1934 and 1939. Its seat was in the city of Khabarovsk. The oblast was located in the eastern part of the Russian Far East, and its territory is currently divided between Khabarovsk and Primorsky Krais. The oblast was created as part of the Far Eastern Krai and briefly became part of the newly created Khabarovsk Krai when the former was abolished in 1938, before being merged into the latter.

== History ==
Khabarovsk Oblast was created as part of the Far Eastern Krai by a resolution of the All-Russian Central Executive Committee (VTsIK) on 22 July 1934, with its seat in the city of Khabarovsk. It was subdivided into seven districts (raions): Bikinsky, Vyazemsky, Kalininsky, Komsomolsky, Kur-Urminsky National, Nanaysky National, and Khabarovsky. The oblast had a population of 264,000 in 1934 and included an area of 224,850 square kilometres (86,820 mi^{2}). A VTsIK resolution of 25 January 1935 created Verinsky District (Lazovsky District from 1 April) from part of Vyazemsky District, and Novopokrovsky District (Postyshevsky District from 20 February 1935 and Krasnoarmeysky District from 20 March 1938). Komsomolsky District was abolished on 27 May and Khabarovsky followed on 31 December.

Khabarovsky District was reestablished by a VTSiK resolution of 31 May 1937. On 20 October 1938 the oblast became part of Khabarovsk Krai when the Far Eastern Krai was abolished and its territory split, except for the Kalininsky and Krasnoarmeysky Districts, which joined Primorsky Krai. Bikinsky District was simultaneously abolished, with 26 of its selsoviets being transferred to Primorsky Krai, and the remaining thirteen joining Vyazemsky District. The oblast was abolished by a decree of the Presidium of the Supreme Soviet of the Russian Soviet Federative Socialist Republic on 26 May, with its districts directly administered by Khabarovsk Krai.
