= Pavlo Vinkovatov =

Soviet footballer

Personal information
- Date of birth: 25 July 1921
- Place of birth: Kharkiv, Ukrainian SSR
- Date of death: 21 April 1987 (aged 65)
- Place of death: Kyiv, Ukrainian SSR, Soviet Union
- Position: Forward

Senior career*
Years	Team	Apps	(Gls)
1939–1940	FC Silmash Kharkiv	46	(16)
1941–1955	Dynamo Kyiv	216	(65)

Managerial career
- 1958–1959: FC Prohress Berdychiv
- * Club domestic league appearances and goals

Pavlo Ivanovych Vinkovatov (Ukrainian: Павло Іванович Віньковатов; 25 July 1921, Kharkiv, Ukrainian SSR – 21 April 1987, Kyiv, Soviet Union) was a Soviet footballer who played as a forward.
