= Association football at the 1956 Summer Olympics – Men's team squads =

The following squads were named for the 1956 Summer Olympics tournament.

== Australia ==
Head coach: Richard Telfer

No.	Pos.	Player	DoB	Age	Caps	Club	Tournament games	Tournament goals	Minutes played	Sub off	Sub on	Cards yellow/red
1	GK	Billy Henderson	November 23, 1929	26	5	(Australia) Granville	0	0	0	0	0	0/0
2	GK	Ron Lord	August 25, 1929	27	1	(Australia) Auburn	2	0	180	0	0
3	FW	Col Kitching	November 11, 1933	22	2		0	0	0	0	0	0/0
4	MF	Pete Stone			0	(Australia) Bankstown	0	0	0	0	0	0/0
5	MF	Ted Smith	September 24, 1935	21	0		2	0	180	0	0
6	MF	George Arthur	1925	31	0	(Australia) Wallsend FC	2	0	180	0	0
7	FW	Bill Harburn			0		0	0	0	0	0	0/0
8	MF	Alwyn Warren	November 1, 1931	25	1		2	0	180	0	0
9	MF	Alastair Rattray	February 16, 1925	31	0		0	0	0	0	0	0/0
10	FW	Alec Beattie			0		0	0	0	0	0	0/0
11	DF	Bob Bignall	March 14, 1922	34	5	(Australia) Corrimal	2	0	180	0	0
12	DF	John Pettigrew	October 31, 1934	21	1		2	0	180	0	0
13	MF	Francis Loughran	January 31, 1931	25	3	(Australia) Moreland F.C.	2	1	180	0	0
14	MF	Bob Wemyss	July 1, 1928	28	0		0	0	0	0	0	0/0
15	MF	Jack Lennard	April 2, 1930	26	3	(Australia) Cessnock	2	0	180	0	0
16	MF	Brian Vogler	May 30, 1932	24	0		0	0	0	0	0	0/0
17	FW	Bruce Morrow	May 5, 1936	20	0	(Australia) Wallsend FC	2	2	180	0	0
18	DF	Con Purser	August 2, 1931	25	1	(Australia) North Perth	0	0	0	0	0	0/0
19	FW	Graham McMillan	January 21, 1936	20	0		2	1	180	0	0
20	MF	Cliff Sander	November 11, 1931	25	6		2	0	180	0	0

== Bulgaria ==
Head coaches: Stoyan Ormandzhiev & Krum Milev

No.	Pos.	Player	DoB	Age	Caps	Club	Tournament games	Tournament goals	Minutes played	Sub off	Sub on	Cards yellow/red
5	GK	Georgi Naydenov	December 21, 1931	24	?	(Bulgaria) CDNA
11	DF	Kiril Rakarov	May 24, 1932	24	?	(Bulgaria) CDNA
13	DF	Manol Manolov	October 22, 1926	30	?	(Bulgaria) CDNA
18	DF	Nikola Kovachev	June 4, 1934	22	?	(Bulgaria) CDNA
20	MF	Stefan Bozhkov	September 20, 1923	33	?	(Bulgaria) CDNA
2	MF	Gavril Stoyanov	July 9, 1929	27	?	(Bulgaria) CDNA
3	FW	Todor Diev	September 28, 1934	22	?	(Bulgaria) Spartak Plovdiv
19	FW	Georgi Dimitrov	May 1, 1931	25	?	(Bulgaria) CDNA
6	FW	Dimitar Milanov	August 25, 1929	27	?	(Bulgaria) CDNA
7	FW	Ivan Kolev	November 1, 1930	26	?	(Bulgaria) CDNA
12	FW	Panayot Panayotov	December 30, 1930	25	?	(Bulgaria) CDNA
9	GK	Yordan Yosifov	August 12, 1932	24	?	(Bulgaria) Slavia Sofia
1	FW	Krum Yanev	January 9, 1929	27	?	(Bulgaria) CDNA
10	DF	Milcho Goranov	November 6, 1928	28	?	(Bulgaria) Slavia Sofia
14	DF	Iliya Kirchev	December 28, 1932	23	?	(Bulgaria) Spartak Varna

== United Team of Germany ==
Head coach: Sepp Herberger

No.	Pos.	Player	DoB	Age	Caps	Club	Tournament games	Tournament goals	Minutes played	Sub off	Sub on	Cards yellow/red
15	MF	Albert Brülls	March 26, 1937	19	?	(West Germany) Borussia Mönchengladbach
2	GK	Manfred Eglin	October 10, 1935	21	?	(West Germany) Karlsruher FV
11	FW	Rolf Geiger	October 16, 1934	22	?	(West Germany) Stuttgarter Kickers
3	MF	Willi Gerdau	February 12, 1929	27	?	(West Germany) Heider SV
1	GK	Albert Görtz	November 18, 1933	23	?	(West Germany) Düsseldorfer SC 99
14	MF	Ernst-Günter Habig	September 14, 1935	21	?	(West Germany) Rapid Köln
4	DF	Hermann Höfer	July 17, 1934	22	?	(West Germany) Eintracht Frankfurt
6	DF	Karl Hoffmann	October 10, 1935	21	?	(West Germany) Fortuna Düsseldorf
7	MF	Rudi Hoffmann	February 11, 1935	21	?	(West Germany) Viktoria Aschaffenburg
5	DF	Günter Jäger	December 21, 1935	20	?	(West Germany) Fortuna Düsseldorf
10	FW	Matthias Mauritz	November 13, 1924	32	?	(West Germany) Fortuna Düsseldorf
13	MF	Herbert Schäfer	October 16, 1927	29	?	(West Germany) Sportfreunde Siegen
9	FW	Max Schwall	September 2, 1932	24	?	(West Germany) FV Daxlanden
8	MF	Fritz Semmelmann	July 24, 1928	18	?	(West Germany) SpVgg Bayreuth
12	FW	Johann Zeitler	April 30, 1927	29	?	(West Germany) VfB Bayreuth

== Great Britain ==
Great Britain is allowed to be one of the first football teams to order players alphabetically. The same system used by many World Cup squad like Argentina in 1978, 1982 and 1986, Italy in 1966 and 1968 and the Netherlands in 1974.

Head coach: Norman Creek

No.	Pos.	Player	DoB	Age	Caps	Club	Tournament games	Tournament goals	Minutes played	Sub off	Sub on	Cards yellow/red
2		George Bromilow	December 4, 1931	24	?	(England) Southport
4		Herbert Dodkins	December 20, 1929	26	?
5		Leslie Thomas Farrer	December 22, 1922	33	?
6	FW	Bob Hardisty	December 1, 1921	34	?	(England) Bishop Auckland
7	FW	John Laybourne	May 26, 1927	29	?
8	FW	Derek Lewin	May 18, 1930	26	?	(England) Bishop Auckland
9	FW	James Lewis	June 26, 1927	29	?	(England) Chelsea	2	2
11		Stanley Prince	January 24, 1927	29	?
13	GK	Harry Sharratt	December 16, 1929	26	?	(England) Bishop Auckland
12	DF	Terry Robinson	August 11, 1929	27	?	(England) Brentford
14		Donald Stoker	December 30, 1922	23	?	(England) Sutton United
15		Lawrence Topp	November 11, 1923	33	?	(England) Hendon F.C.
16	MF	Charlie Twissell	December 16, 1932	23	?	(England) Plymouth Argyle
10	GK	Mike Pinner	February 16, 1934	22	?	(England) Pegasus
1	DF	Dexter Adams	April 4, 1925	31	?	(England) Hendon
3	FW	James "Jimmy" T. R. Coates	October 1929	26	?	(England) Royal Navy FA and (England) Kingstonian F.C.

== India ==
Head coach: S. A. Rahim

No.	Pos.	Player	DoB	Age	Caps	Club	Tournament games	Tournament goals	Minutes played	Sub off	Sub on	Cards yellow/red
12	MF	Hussain Ahmed	1932		?	(India) Hyderabad
9	DF	Syed Khaja Azizuddin	July 12, 1929	27	?	(India) Hyderabad Police
15	FW	Tulsidas Balaram	November 30, 1936	20	?	(India) Hyderabad
5	FW	Pradip Kumar Banerjee	October 15, 1936	20	?	(India) Bengal
1	FW	Samar Banerjee (captain)	1932		?	(India) Mohun Bagan AC
14	FW	Neville D'Souza	1932		?	(India) Bombay
7	FW	Muhammad Kannayan	1932		?	(India) Bombay-Nagpur Railway
6	MF	Mariappa Kempiah	February 10, 1933	23	?	(India) East Bengal Club
2	FW	J. Kittu Krishnaswamy	1932		?	(India) East Bengal Club
10	DF	Sheikh Abdul Latif	May 8, 1934	22	?	(India) Hyderabad
11	MF	Muhammad Noor	1925		?	(India) Hyderabad Police
17	GK	S. S. Narayan	November 12, 1934	22	?	(India) Caltex Bombay
4	MF	Nikhil Nandy	1932		?	(India) Eastern Railway SC
3	FW	Kesto Pal	1934		?	(India) Bengal
8	DF	Abdul Rahman	1934		?	(India) Rajasthan Club
13	MF	Muhammad Salaam	1931		?	(India) Bengal
16	GK	Peter Thangaraj	December 24, 1935	20	?	(India) Services
18	FW	Mohammed Zulfiqaruddin			?	(India) Hyderabad Police

== Indonesia ==
Head coach: (Socialist Federal Republic of Yugoslavia) Antun Pogačnik

No.	Pos.	Player	DoB	Age	Caps	Club	Tournament games	Tournament goals	Minutes played	Sub off	Sub on	Cards yellow/red
18	FW	Achad Arifin	November 1, 1936		?	(Indonesia) PSP Padang	1		90
3	DF	Chairuddin Siregar	August 7, 1929		?	(Indonesia) Persija Jakarta	2		180
15	FW	Ashari Danoe	October 21, 1932	24	?	(Indonesia) PSIS Semarang	1		90
20	FW	Jasrin Jusron	February 2, 1936		?	(Indonesia) PSIS Semarang	1		90
7	DF	Kwee Kiat Sek	January 11, 1934	22	?	(Indonesia) Persib Bandung	2		180
1	GK	Maulwi Saelan	August 8, 1928	28	?	(Indonesia) PSM Makassar	2		180
5	DF	Mohamed Rashjid	August 15, 1929		?	(Indonesia) PSMS Medan	2		180
19	FW	Phwa Sian Liong	January 26, 1931	34	?	(Indonesia) Persebaya Surabaya	1		180
12	FW	Andi Ramang	April 24, 1928	28	?	(Indonesia) PSM Makassar	2		180
9	MF	Tan Ling Houw	July 26, 1930	26	?	(Indonesia) Persija Jakarta	2		180
4	DF	Thio Him Tjiang	August 28, 1929	27	?	(Indonesia) Persija Jakarta	2		180
17	FW	Aang Witarsa	December 3, 1930	26	?	(Indonesia) Persib Bandung	2		180
8	MF	Ramlan Yatim	September 10, 1922	34	?	(Indonesia) PSMS Medan	2		180
2	GK	Paidjo			?	(Indonesia) Persema Malang	0		0
6	DF	M. Sidhi			?	(Indonesia) Persebaya Surabaya	0		0
10	MF	Rukma Sudjana	August 27, 1935		?	(Indonesia) Persib Bandung	0		0
11	MF	Kasmuri			?	(Indonesia) Persip Pekalongan	0		0
13	FW	Ramli Yatim	July 12, 1921		?	(Indonesia) PSMS Medan	0		0
14	FW	Djamiat Dalhar	November 25, 1927		?	(Indonesia) Persija Jakarta	0		0
16	FW	Ade Dana	March 4, 1931		?	(Indonesia) Persib Bandung	0		0

== Japan ==
Head coach: (Japan) Shigemaru Takenokoshi

No.	Pos.	Player	Date of birth	Age	Caps	Club	Tournament games	Tournament goals	Minutes played	Sub off	Sub on	Cards yellow/red
4	GK	Yoshio Furukawa	July 5, 1934	22	?	Dunlop Japan
7		Ryuzo Hiraki	October 7, 1931	25	?	(Japan) Kwansei Gakuin University
15		Isao Iwabuchi	November 17, 1932	24	?	(Japan) Toyota Motor SC
13		Tadao Kobayashi	July 7, 1930	26	?	(Japan) Tokyo Marine
10		Waichiro Omura	January 1, 1933	23	?	(Japan) Tanabe Pharmaceuticals
9		Michihiro Ozawa	December 25, 1932	23	?	(Japan) Toyo Industries
8		Hiroaki Sato	February 5, 1932	24	?	(Japan) NKK Corporation
11		Yasuo Takamori	March 3, 1934	22	?	(Japan) Rikkyo University
12		Masanori Tokita	June 24, 1925	31	?	(Japan) Tanabe Pharmaceuticals
17		Masao Uchino	April 21, 1934	22	?	(Japan) Chuo University
16		Shigeo Yaegashi	March 24, 1933	23	?	(Japan) Furukawa Electric
3	GK	Yukio Shimomura	January 25, 1932	24	?	(Japan) Toyo Industries
2		Isamu Kinoshita			?
5		Takashi Takabayashi	August 2, 1931	25	?	(Japan) Tanabe Pharmaceuticals
6		Kakuichi Mimura	August 16, 1931	25	?	(Japan) Toho Titanium
1		Taizo Kawamoto	January 17, 1914	42	?	(Japan) Kawaso Electric
14		Ken Naganuma	September 5, 1930	26	?	(Japan) Furukawa Electric
18		Akira Kitaguchi	March 8, 1935	21	?	(Japan) Kwansei Gakuin University

== Thailand ==
Head coach: Bunchoo Samutkojon

No.	Pos.	Player	DoB	Age	Caps	Club	Tournament games	Tournament goals	Minutes played	Sub off	Sub on	Cards yellow/red
1	GK	Kasem Baikam		1932 (aged 19–20)	?
2	MF	Samruay Chaiyonk		12 February 1933 (aged 19)	?
3	DF	Prateep Chermudhai		1923 (aged 28–29)	?
4	FW	Sukit Chitranukhroh		1928 (aged 23–24)	?
5	DF	Surapong Chutimawong		1933 (aged 18–19)	?
6	MF	Nophon Hayachanta		1933 (aged 18–19)	?
7	FW	Bumphen Luttimol		21 September 1930 (aged 22)	?
9	FW	Suchart Mutugun		7 April 1934 (aged 18)	?
8	FW	Laevivathana Milinthachinda		5 February 1923 (aged 29)	?
12	MF	Prasan Suvannasith		7 October 1933 (aged 19)	?
13	MF	Wanchai Suvaree		1931 (aged 20–21)	?
11	GK	Tu Suwanit			?
10	FW	Nit Sriyabhaya			?

== United States ==
Head coach: Jimmy Mills

No.	Pos.	Player	DoB	Age	Caps	Club	Tournament games	Tournament goals	Minutes played	Sub off	Sub on	Cards yellow/red
1	MF	John Carden			0	(United States) Armed Forces Service Team	0	0	0	0	0	0
2	GK	Ronald Coder	1929	0	0	(United States) Armed Forces Service Team	0	0	0	0	0	0
3	MF	Bill Conterio	November 29, 1929	27	0	(United States) Chicago Falcons	1	0	90	0	0	0
4	MF	Jim Dorrian	March 6, 1931	25	0	(United States) Danish F.C.	1	0	90	0	0	0
5	GK	Svend Engedal	June 23, 1928	28	0	(United States) Danish-American SC	1	0	90	0	0	0
6	DF	Harry Keough	November 15, 1927	28	13	(United States) St. Louis Kutis S.C.	1	0	90	0	0	0
7	FW	William Looby	November 11, 1931	25	5	(United States) St. Louis Kutis S.C.	1	0	90	0	0	0
8	DF	Alfonso Marina			0	(United States) Brooklyn Hispano	0	0	0	0	0	0
9	FW	Ruben Mendoza	June 2, 1931	25	1	(United States) St. Louis Kutis S.C.	1	0	90	0	0	0
10	FW	Lloyd Monsen	May 7, 1931	25	2	(United States) New York Hakoah-Americans	1	0	90	0	0	0
11	FW	Ed Murphy	November 6, 1930	26	1	(United States) Chicago Falcons	1	0	90	0	0	0
12	FW	Dick Packer			0	(United States) Uhrik Truckers	0	0	0	0	0	0
13	DF	Zenon Snylyk	November 14, 1933	23	0	(United States) Chicago Levy	1	0	90	0	0	0
14	DF	Herman Wecke	March 10, 1927	29	3	(United States) St. Louis Kutis S.C.	1	0	90	0	0	0
15	DF	Siegbert Wirth			0	(United States) Armed Forces Service Team	0	0	0	0	0	0
16	MF	Al Zerhusen	December 4, 1931	25	0	(United States) Kolping SC	1	1	90	0	0	0

== Soviet Union ==
Head coach: Gavril Kachalin

No.	Pos.	Player	DoB	Age	Caps	Club	Tournament games	Tournament goals	Minutes played	Sub off	Sub on	Cards yellow/red
4	DF	Anatoli Bashashkin	February 23, 1924	32	?	(Soviet Union) PFC CSKA Moscow
10	MF	Iosif Betsa	November 6, 1929	27	?	(Soviet Union) PFC CSKA Moscow
15	FW	Anatoli Ilyin	June 27, 1931	25	?	(Soviet Union) FC Spartak Moscow
12	FW	Anatoli Isayev	July 14, 1932	24	?	(Soviet Union) FC Spartak Moscow
16	FW	Valentin Ivanov	November 19, 1934	22	?	(Soviet Union) FC Torpedo Moscow
6	DF	Boris Kuznetsov	July 14, 1928	28	?	(Soviet Union) FC Dynamo Moscow
9	DF	Anatoli Maslyonkin	June 29, 1930	26	?	(Soviet Union) FC Spartak Moscow
8	MF	Igor Netto	January 9, 1930	26	?	(Soviet Union) FC Spartak Moscow
5	DF	Mikhail Ogonkov	July 24, 1932	24	?	(Soviet Union) FC Spartak Moscow
7	MF	Aleksei Paramonov	February 21, 1925	21	?	(Soviet Union) FC Spartak Moscow
2	GK	Boris Razinsky	July 12, 1933	23	?	(Soviet Union) PFC CSKA Moscow
18	FW	Vladimir Ryzhkin	December 29, 1930	25	?	(Soviet Union) FC Dynamo Moscow
14	FW	Sergei Salnikov	September 13, 1925	31	?	(Soviet Union) FC Spartak Moscow
13	FW	Nikita Simonyan	October 12, 1926	30	?	(Soviet Union) FC Spartak Moscow
17	FW	Eduard Streltsov	July 21, 1937	19	?	(Soviet Union) FC Torpedo Moscow
11	FW	Boris Tatushin	March 31, 1933	23	?	(Soviet Union) FC Spartak Moscow
3	DF	Nikolai Tishchenko	December 10, 1926	29	?	(Soviet Union) FC Spartak Moscow
1	GK	Lev Yashin	October 22, 1929	27	?	(Soviet Union) FC Dynamo Moscow
20	DF	Anatoli Porkhunov	July 28, 1928	28	?	(Soviet Union) FC CSKA Moscow
19	FW	Yuri Belyaev	April 2, 1934	22	?	(Soviet Union) FC CSKA Moscow

== Yugoslavia ==
Head coach: Milovan Ćirić

No.	Pos.	Player	DoB	Age	Caps	Club	Tournament games	Tournament goals	Minutes played	Sub off	Sub on	Cards yellow/red
1	GK	Petar Radenković	October 1, 1934	22	?	(Socialist Federal Republic of Yugoslavia) BSK Beograd
2	DF	Mladen Koščak	October 16, 1936	20	?	(Socialist Federal Republic of Yugoslavia) Dinamo Zagreb
3	DF	Nikola Radović	October 20, 1932	24	?	(Socialist Federal Republic of Yugoslavia) Hajduk Split
4	DF	Dobrosav Krstić	February 5, 1934	22	?	(Socialist Federal Republic of Yugoslavia) Vojvodina
5	DF	Ivan Šantek	April 23, 1932	24	?	(Socialist Federal Republic of Yugoslavia) NK Zagreb
6	MF	Kruno Radiljević	1931		?	(Socialist Federal Republic of Yugoslavia) Velež
7	FW	Luka Lipošinović	May 12, 1933	23	?	(Socialist Federal Republic of Yugoslavia) Dinamo Zagreb
8	FW	Muhamed Mujić	April 25, 1932	24	?	(Socialist Federal Republic of Yugoslavia) Velež
9	FW	Zlatko Papec	January 17, 1934	22	?	(Socialist Federal Republic of Yugoslavia) Hajduk Split
10	FW	Todor Veselinović	October 22, 1930	26	?	(Socialist Federal Republic of Yugoslavia) Vojvodina
11	MF	Dragoslav Šekularac	November 30, 1937	19	?	(Socialist Federal Republic of Yugoslavia) Red Star Belgrade
12	GK	Blagoja Vidinić	June 11, 1934	22	?	(Socialist Federal Republic of Yugoslavia) Radnički Beograd
13	DF	Ibrahim Biogradlić	March 8, 1931	25	?	(Socialist Federal Republic of Yugoslavia) Sarajevo
14	MF	Vladica Popović	March 17, 1935	21	?	(Socialist Federal Republic of Yugoslavia) Red Star Belgrade
15	DF	Ljubiša Spajić	March 7, 1926	30	?	(Socialist Federal Republic of Yugoslavia) Red Star Belgrade
16	FW	Sava Antić	March 1, 1930	26	?	(Socialist Federal Republic of Yugoslavia) BSK Beograd
17	FW	Joško Vidošević	January 11, 1935	21	?	(Socialist Federal Republic of Yugoslavia) Hajduk Split
