= Football at the 1956 Spartakiad of the Peoples of the USSR =

1956 Spartakiad of Peoples of the USSR football tournament
Tournament details
- Host country: Moscow
- Dates: 2 August – 16 August
- Teams: 18
- Venue(s): 5 (in 1 host city)

Final positions
- Champions: Moscow (2nd title)
- Runners-up: (Georgian Soviet Socialist Republic) Georgian SSR
- Third place: (Ukrainian Soviet Socialist Republic) Ukrainian SSR
- Fourth place: (Saint Petersburg) Leningrad

Tournament statistics
- Matches played: 37
- Goals scored: 134 (3.62 per match)

The football tournament at the 1956 Spartakiad of Peoples of the USSR was a preparatory competition for the Soviet Union national football team for the upcoming 1956 Summer Olympics. The competition took place on August 2 – 16, 1956 as part of the Spartakiad of Peoples of the USSR. The Soviet team has already qualified for the Olympic tournament by winning a play-off match up against Israel national football team earlier in July 1956 (Association football at the 1956 Summer Olympics – Men's qualification). The Soviet team competed under the name of the Moscow city team.

Before the tournament, on 16 July 1956 Karelo-Finnish Soviet Socialist Republic was annexed by the Russian SFSR by changing its status from a union republic to an autonomous republic of the Russian SFSR. Nonetheless, the team of the Karelo-Finnish SSR was still participating at the tournament.

== Competition ==
=== Main tournament ===
==== Qualification round ====
- Latvia - Azerbaijan 1:5
- Estonia - Lithuania 0:1

==== Round of 16 ====
- Armenia - Tajikistan 3:0
- Belarus - Kyrgyzstan 1:0
- Azerbaijan - Karelia 5:1
- Georgia - Moldova 4:0
- Russia - Uzbekistan 3:1
- Leningrad - Turkmenistan 2:0
- Ukraine - Kazakhstan 2:1
- Moscow - Lithuania 2:0

==== Quarterfinals ====
- Russia - Leningrad 0:2
- Georgia - Armenia 4:2
- Ukraine - Azerbaijan 4:1
- Moscow - Belarus 5:1

==== Semifinals ====
- Georgia - Ukraine 3:1
- Moscow - Leningrad 3:2

==== For 3rd place ====
15 August 1956

Ukraina	2 – 1	Leningrad
Boboshko 52'; Voynov 54'	[ Report]	Denisov 62'

Tsentralnyi stadion Dinamo, Moscow
Attendance: 5,000
Referee: Nikolay Khlopotin (Moscow)

=== Final ===
16 August 1956

Moskva	2 – 1	Grouzia
Salnikov 34'; Ilyin 69'	[ Report]	Khasaya 38'

Tsentralnyi stadion imeni Lenina, Moscow
Attendance: 103,000
Referee: Pyotr Belov (Leningrad)

Moscow:
GK	16	Boris Razinsky
DF	2	Nikolai Tishchenko
DF	3	Anatoli Bashashkin
DF	4	Mikhail Ogonkov
MF	5	Aleksei Paramonov
MF	6	Anatoli Maslyonkin
FW	7	Boris Tatushin	(substituted off) 25'
FW	8	Valentin Ivanov
FW	9	Eduard Streltsov
FW	10	Sergei Salnikov (c)	34'
FW	15	Ivan Mozer
Substitutes:
FW	11	Anatoli Ilyin	(substituted in) 25'	69'
Manager:
Gavriil Kachalin

Georgian SSR:
GK	1	Mikhail Pirayev
MF	5	Aleksandr Kotrikadze
DF	3	Niyazbey Dzyapshipa
DF	4	Givi Khocholava
MF	14	Shota Iamanidze
MF	6	Avtandil Gogoberidze (c)
FW	7	Boris Khasaya	38'
FW	8	Konstantin Gagnidze
FW	10	Zaur Kaloev
FW	9	Andrei Zazroyev
FW	11	Avtandil Ch'k'uaseli
Substitutes:
Manager:
Gaioz Jejelava

MATCH OFFICIALS

- Assistant referees:

MATCH RULES

- 90 minutes.
- 30 minutes of extra-time if necessary.
- Penalty shoot-out if scores still level.

=== Consolation tournament for quarterfinalists ===
==== Semifinals ====
- Azerbaijan - Armenia 0:3
- Russia - Belarus 4:2

==== For 7th place ====
- Azerbaijan - Belarus 0:2

==== For 5th place ====
- Armenia - Russia 2:1

=== Consolation tournament ===
==== Quarterfinals ====
- Latvia - Kazakhstan 2:1
- Moldova - Tajikistan 6:0
- Uzbekistan - Turkmenistan 3:0
- Estonia - Kyrgyzstan 2:1
- Karelia - bye
- Lithuania - bye

==== Semifinals ====
- Karelia - Latvia 0:5
- Moldova - Uzbekistan 4:3
- Estonia - Lithuania 0:2

==== For 10th place ====
- Moldova - Lithuania 4:1

==== For 9th place ====
- Latvia - Moldova 2:1

==== For 12th place ====
- Uzbekistan - Karelia 2:1
- Uzbekistan - Estonia 2:0

=== Tournament for losing teams ===
==== Semifinals ====
- Kazakhstan - Tajikistan 3:0
- Turkmenistan - Kyrgyzstan 0:1

==== For 15th place ====
- Kazakhstan - Kyrgyzstan 2:1

==== For 17th place ====
- Tajikistan - Turkmenistan 2:3

== Squads composition ==
=== Moscow ===
Head coach: Gavriil Kachalin, assistant: Nikolay Gulyayev (Spartak Moscow)

No.	Pos.	Player	Date of birth (age)	Caps	Goals	Club
1	GK	Lev Yashin (ms)	22 October 1929 (aged 26)	2	0	Dynamo Moscow
2	DF	Nikolai Tishchenko (ms)	10 December 1926 (aged 29)	4	0	Spartak Moscow
3	DF	Anatoli Bashashkin (mms)	23 February 1924 (aged 32)	3	0	CDSA Moscow
4	DF	Mikhail Ogonkov (ms)	24 June 1932 (aged 24)	3	0	Spartak Moscow
5	MF	Aleksei Paramonov (mms)	21 February 1925 (aged 31)	4	0	Spartak Moscow
6	MF	Anatoli Maslyonkin	29 June 1930 (aged 26)	4	1	Spartak Moscow
7	FW	Boris Tatushin (ms)	31 March 1933 (aged 23)	2	1	Spartak Moscow
8	FW	Valentin Ivanov	19 November 1934 (aged 21)	3	2	Torpedo Moscow
9	FW	Eduard Streltsov	21 July 1937 (aged 19)	4	1	Torpedo Moscow
10	FW	Sergei Salnikov (mms)	13 September 1925 (aged 30)	4	2	Spartak Moscow
11	FW	Anatoli Ilyin (ms)	27 June 1931 (aged 25)	3	1	Spartak Moscow
12	FW	Nikita Simonyan (mms)	12 October 1926 (aged 29)	1	2	Spartak Moscow
13	FW	Anatoli Isayev (ms)	14 July 1932 (aged 24)	2	1	Spartak Moscow
14	DF	Boris Kuznetsov (ms)	14 July 1928 (aged 28)	1	0	Dynamo Moscow
15	FW	Ivan Mozer (ms)	21 December 1933 (aged 22)	4	1	Spartak Moscow
16	GK	Boris Razinsky (ms)	12 July 1933 (aged 23)	2	0	CDSA Moscow
17	MF	Igor Netto (mms)	9 January 1930 (aged 26)	0	0	Spartak Moscow

=== Georgian SSR ===
Head coach: Gaioz Jejelava (Dinamo Tbilisi), assistant: Archil Kiknadze (Dinamo Tbilisi)

No.	Pos.	Player	Date of birth (age)	Caps	Goals	Club
1	GK	Mikhail Pirayev (ms)	6 November 1921 (aged 34)	2	0	Dinamo Tbilisi
2	DF	Vladimir Eloshvili (ms)	20 September 1927 (aged 28)			Dinamo Tbilisi
3	DF	Niyazbey Dzyapshipa (mms)	14 November 1927 (aged 28)	4	0	Dinamo Tbilisi
4	DF	Givi Khocholava	1932 (aged ~24)			Dinamo Tbilisi
5	MF	Aleksandr Kotrikadze (mms)	3 December 1930 (aged 25)			Dinamo Tbilisi
6	MF	Avtandil Gogoberidze (mms)	3 August 1922 (aged 33)	4	1	Dinamo Tbilisi
7	FW	Boris Khasaya	1932 (aged ~24)		1	Dinamo Tbilisi
8	FW	Konstantin Gagnidze (mms)	1926 (aged ~30)	4	2	Dinamo Tbilisi
9	FW	Andrei Zazroyev (mms)	2 September 1923 (aged 32)	4	1	Dinamo Tbilisi
10	FW	Zaur Kaloev (ms)	24 March 1931 (aged 25)		4	Dinamo Tbilisi
11	FW	Avtandil Ch'k'uaseli (ms)	31 December 1931 (aged 24)	4	3	Dinamo Tbilisi
12	GK	Vladimir Margania (mms)	8 February 1928 (aged 28)	2	0	Dinamo Tbilisi
13	DF	Robert Chanchaleishvili	1936 (aged ~20)			Lokomotivi Tbilisi
14	MF	Shota Iamanidze	15 March 1937 (aged 19)	3	0	Dinamo Tbilisi
15	FW	Mikheil Meskhi	12 January 1937 (aged 19)			Dinamo Tbilisi
16	FW	Alexei Kvlividze	1935 (aged ~21)			Dinamo Tbilisi
17	MF	Avtandil Kheladze	1936 (aged ~20)			Dinamo Tbilisi

=== Ukrainian SSR ===
Head coach: Oleg Oshenkov (Dynamo Kyiv), assistant: Anton Idzkovsky (FShM Kyiv)

No.	Pos.	Player	Date of birth (age)	Caps	Goals	Club
1	GK	Oleh Makarov (ms)	26 July 1929 (aged 27)	2	0	Dynamo Kyiv
2	DF	Vladimir Yerokhin	10 April 1930 (aged 26)			Dynamo Kyiv
3	DF	Vitaliy Holubyev (ms)	19 March 1926 (aged 30)			Dynamo Kyiv
4	DF	Tiberiy Popovich (ms)	20 September 1930 (aged 25)	3	0	Dynamo Kyiv
5	MF	Yuriy Voynov (ms)	29 November 1931 (aged 24)	4	4	Dynamo Kyiv
6	MF	Ernest Yust (ms)	17 June 1927 (aged 29)	3	0	Dynamo Kyiv
7	FW	Ivan Boboshko	9 July 1930 (aged 26)		1	Shakhtar Stalino
8	FW	Viktor Terentiev (ms)	16 December 1924 (aged 31)		2	Dynamo Kyiv
9	FW	Sergei Korshunov (ms)	8 October 1928 (aged 27)	4	1	Dynamo Kyiv
10	FW	Mykhaylo Koman (ms)	1 April 1928 (aged 28)			Dynamo Kyiv
11	FW	Viktor Fomin (ms)	13 January 1929 (aged 27)	4	1	Dynamo Kyiv
12	GK	Yevhen Lemeshko	11 December 1930 (aged 25)	2	0	Dynamo Kyiv
13	FW	Viktor Kanevskyi	3 October 1936 (aged 19)	4	0	Dynamo Kyiv
14	DF	Vitaliy Sobolev	25 January 1930 (aged 26)			Dynamo Kyiv
15	MF	Myroslav Dumanskyi	17 June 1929 (aged 27)			Shakhtar Stalino
16	FW	Valentyn Sapronov	23 January 1932 (aged 24)			Shakhtar Stalino
17	FW	Georgiy Grammatikopulo (ms)	7 March 1930 (aged 26)			Dynamo Kyiv

=== Leningrad ===
Head coach: Arkadi Alov (Zenit Leningrad)

No.	Pos.	Player	Date of birth (age)	Caps	Goals	Club
1	GK	Yury Trofimov	29 March 1932 (aged 24)			Trudovyie Rezervy Leningrad
2	DF	Mark Gek	21 March 1934 (aged 22)			Zenit Leningrad
3	DF	Nikolay Samarin (ms)	4 December 1924 (aged 31)			Zenit Leningrad
4	DF	Pavlo Khudoyash	7 March 1926 (aged 30)			Zenit Leningrad
5	MF	Viktor Belkov	14 April 1930 (aged 26)			Zenit Leningrad
6	MF	Mikhail Rodin (ms)	27 April 1927 (aged 29)			Zenit Leningrad
7	FW	Aleksei Kolobov (ms)	1929 (aged ~27)			Trudovyie Rezervy Leningrad
8	FW	Aleksandr Tenyagin (ms)	22 August 1927 (aged 28)			Trudovyie Rezervy Leningrad
9	FW	Oleksandr Hulevskyi (ms)	18 March 1928 (aged 28)			Zenit Leningrad
10	FW	Gennadi Bondarenko (ms)	4 February 1929 (aged 27)			Zenit Leningrad
11	FW	Aleksandr Ivanov (ms)	6 March 1928 (aged 28)			Zenit Leningrad
12	DF	Lev Shishkov	1933 (aged ~23)			Trudovyie Rezervy Leningrad
13	MF	Lazar Kravets (ms)	8 March 1925 (aged 31)			Zenit Leningrad
14	MF	Stanislav Zavidonov	14 October 1934 (aged 21)			Trudovyie Rezervy Leningrad
15	FW	Valentin Tsaritsyn	21 February 1931 (aged 25)			Zenit Leningrad
16	FW	Aleksandr Denisov	25 December 1931 (aged 24)			Zenit Leningrad
17	GK	Leonid Ivanov (mms)	25 July 1921 (aged 35)			Zenit Leningrad

=== Armenian SSR ===
Head coach: Abram Dangulov (Spartak Yerevan)

No.	Pos.	Player	Date of birth (age)	Caps	Goals	Club
1	GK	Rafael Matevosyan	18 December 1929 (aged 26)			Spartak Yerevan
2	DF	Grigory Ambartsumyan	28 August 1933 (aged 22)			Spartak Yerevan
3	DF	Kadjair Poladyan	1925 (aged ~31)			Spartak Yerevan
4	DF	Manuk Semerdjian	1928 (aged ~28)			Spartak Yerevan
5	MF	Vladimir Paronyan				Spartak Yerevan
6	MF	Eduard Vardanyan	19 January 1934 (aged 22)			Spartak Yerevan
7	FW	Eduard Kapanakov	1931 (aged ~25)			Spartak Yerevan
8	FW	Arutyun Kegeyan (ms)	9 April 1930 (aged 26)			Spartak Yerevan
9	FW	Valter Antonyan	24 January 1936 (aged 20)			Spartak Yerevan
10	FW	Oganes Abramyan	6 December 1932 (aged 23)			Spartak Yerevan
11	FW	Anatoly Goloshchapov (ms)	5 April 1927 (aged 29)			Spartak Yerevan
12	FW	Arutyun Karadjian	1928 (aged ~28)			Spartak Yerevan
13	DF	Papik Papoyan	25 October 1929 (aged 26)			Spartak Yerevan
14	FW	Musheg Pogosyan	1934 (aged ~22)			Spartak Yerevan
15	FW	Vistal Torosyan	1937 (aged ~19)			Spartak Yerevan
16	FW	T. Aslamazov				Spartak Yerevan
17	GK	Semen Israelyan	18 January 1928 (aged 28)			Spartak Yerevan

=== RSFSR ===
Head coach: Aleksandr Starostin (President of the RSFSR Football Federation (Note: former convict of the Soviet GULAG system released in 1954 through the so-called "rehabilitation"))

No.	Pos.	Player	Date of birth (age)	Caps	Goals	Club
1	GK	Vladimir Migalev	30 April 1936 (aged 20)			Krylia Sovetov Kuibyshev
2	DF	Yuriy Suetov	1933 (aged ~23)			ODO Sverdlovsk
3	DF	Nikolay Linyayev	17 July 1933 (aged 23)			ODO Sverdlovsk
4	DF	Dmytro Bahrych	26 March 1936 (aged 20)			ODO Sverdlovsk
5	MF	Viktor Karpov (mms)	4 March 1927 (aged 29)			Krylia Sovetov Kuibyshev
6	MF	Eduard Dubinski	6 April 1935 (aged 21)			ODO Sverdlovsk
7	FW	Leonid Huzyk	21 February 1933 (aged 23)			Krylia Sovetov Kuibyshev
8	FW	Boris Repin	1 January 1937 (aged 19)			Krylia Sovetov Kuibyshev
9	FW	Vasily Buzunov (ms)	4 February 1928 (aged 28)			ODO Sverdlovsk
10	FW	German Neverov	1935 (aged ~21)			ODO Sverdlovsk
11	FW	Igor Mikhin	18 November 1933 (aged 22)			ODO Sverdlovsk
12	GK	Yuriy Smirnov	9 September 1923 (aged 32)			ODO Sverdlovsk
13	MF	Nikolay Pozdnyakov	23 November 1927 (aged 28)			Krylia Sovetov Kuibyshev
14	FW	Vadim Redkin	16 April 1933 (aged 23)			Krylia Sovetov Kuibyshev
15	MF	Boris Ivanov	19 December 1925 (aged 30)			ODO Sverdlovsk
16	FW	Yuriy Korotkov (ms)	17 February 1928 (aged 28)			Krylia Sovetov Kuibyshev
17	DF	Anatoliy Mazepov	16 November 1929 (aged 26)			Krylia Sovetov Kuibyshev

=== Belarusian SSR ===
Head coach: Mikhail Bozenenkov (Spartak Minsk)

No.	Pos.	Player	Date of birth (age)	Caps	Goals	Club
1	GK	Yuriy Mokhov	7 July 1932 (aged 24)			Spartak Minsk
2	DF	Mikhail Radunski	17 June 1932 (aged 24)			Spartak Minsk
3	DF	Aleksandr Ivanov	25 November 1932 (aged 23)			Spartak Minsk
4	DF	Gennady Abramovich (ms)	25 May 1928 (aged 28)			Spartak Minsk
5	MF	Vyacheslav Artyomov (ms)	7 February 1931 (aged 25)			Spartak Minsk
6	MF	Leonid Yerokhovets	1 May 1935 (aged 21)			Spartak Minsk
7	FW	Dmitry Korneev	4 July 1934 (aged 22)			Spartak Minsk
8	FW	Vladimir Goncharov	30 June 1937 (aged 19)			Spartak Minsk
9	FW	Yury Bachurin (ms)	13 January 1928 (aged 28)			Spartak Minsk
10	FW	Yakov Ruderman	7 May 1937 (aged 19)			Spartak Minsk
11	FW	Leonid Nikulenko	9 May 1937 (aged 19)			Spartak Minsk
12	DF	Pavel Mimrik (ms)	28 June 1921 (aged 35)			Spartak Minsk
13	FW	Gennady Khasin	25 August 1935 (aged 20)			Spartak Minsk
14	FW	Anatoliy Kovalyov	8 December 1936 (aged 19)			Spartak Minsk
15	DF	Leonid Dyomin	1936 (aged ~20)			Spartak Minsk
16	GK	Vladimir Sobol	14 July 1935 (aged 21)			Spartak Minsk
17	FW	Anatoliy Yegorov (ms)	16 December 1927 (aged 28)			Spartak Minsk

=== Azerbaijan SSR ===
Head coach: Victor Panyukov (FShM Tbilisi)

No.	Pos.	Player	Date of birth (age)	Caps	Goals	Club
1	GK	Yuriy Lushnikov				Neftyanik Baku
2	DF	Nazim Huseynov	1931 (aged ~25)			Neftyanik Baku
3	DF	Oleg Mkrtychev	1930 (aged ~26)			Neftyanik Baku
4	DF	Turan Mamedov	1936 (aged ~20)			Neftyanik Baku
5	MF	Marcel Javakhyan	1935 (aged ~21)			Neftyanik Baku
6	MF	Shamil Amirov	1933 (aged ~23)			Neftyanik Baku
7	FW	Barisbey Batashov	1933 (aged ~23)			Neftyanik Baku
8	FW	Anatoliy Terentyev	1931 (aged ~25)			Neftyanik Baku
9	FW	Əli Əbilzadə	1930 (aged ~26)			Neftyanik Baku
10	FW	Vladimir Mikuchadze	1932 (aged ~24)			Neftyanik Baku
11	FW	Vladimir Galkin	1930 (aged ~26)			Neftyanik Baku
12	DF	Vladimir Denisov	1938 (aged ~18)			Neftyanik Baku
13		N. Sultanov				Neftyanik Baku
14	FW	Viktor Smirnov	1937 (aged ~19)			Neftyanik Baku
15	DF	Aleksei Zinin	1933 (aged ~23)			Neftyanik Baku
16	FW	Ahmad Alaskarov	5 October 1935 (aged 20)			Neftyanik Baku
17	GK	Shaban Aliyev	1931 (aged ~25)			Neftyanik Baku
