= Indonesia at the 1956 Summer Olympics =

- IOC code: INA
- NOC: Indonesian Olympic Committee

in Melbourne/Stockholm
- Competitors: 30 in 6 sports
- Medals: Gold 0 Silver 0 Bronze 0 Total 0

Summer Olympics appearances (overview)
- 1952; 1956; 1960; 1964; 1968; 1972; 1976; 1980; 1984; 1988; 1992; 1996; 2000; 2004; 2008; 2012; 2016; 2020; 2024

Indonesia competed at the 1956 Summer Olympics in Melbourne, Australia. 30 competitors, 28 men and 2 women, took part in 11 events in 6 sports.

== Competitors ==
The following is the list of number of competitors participating in the Games:

Sport	Men	Women	Total
Athletics	3	0	3
Fencing	1	0	1
Football	21	0	21
Shooting	1	0	1
Swimming	1	2	3
Weightlifting	1	0	1
Total	28	2	30

== Athletics ==
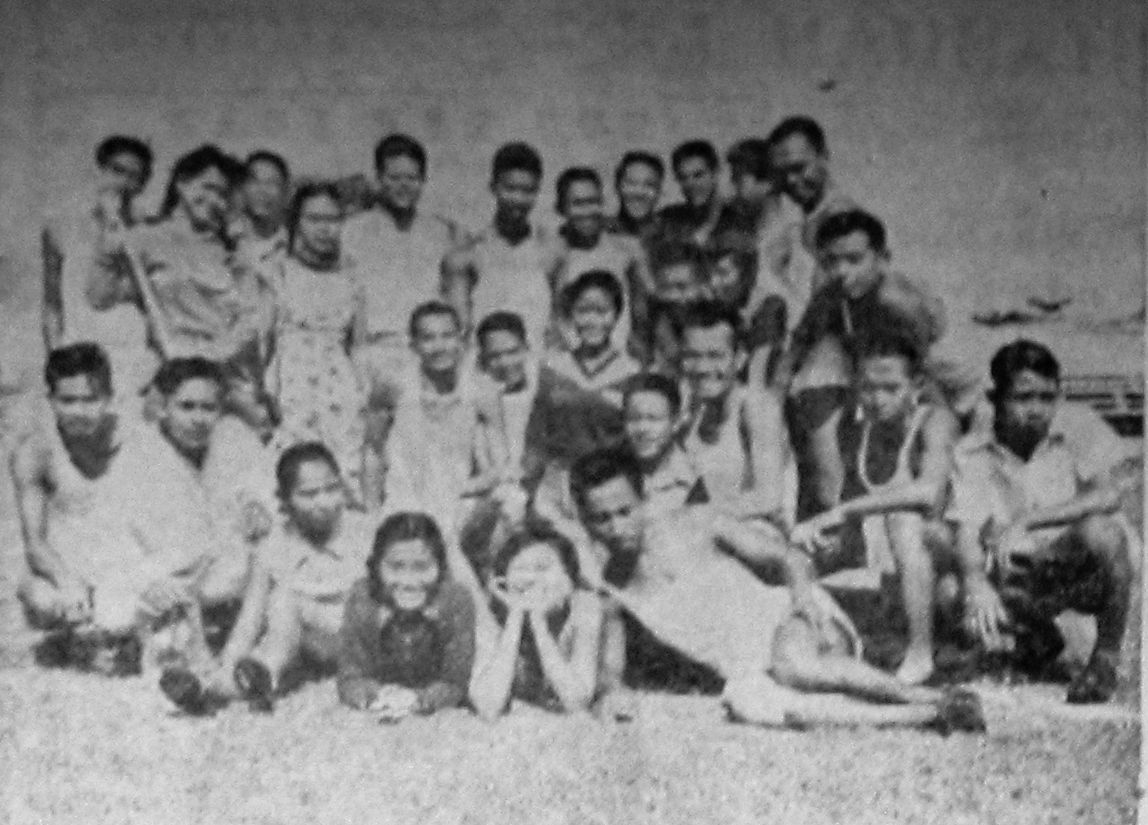
Indonesian Olympic hopefuls in July 1956

Key

- Note–Ranks given for track events are within the athlete's heat only
- Q = Qualified for the next round
- q = Qualified for the next round as a fastest loser or, in field events, by position without achieving the qualifying target
- NR = National record
- N/A = Round not applicable for the event
- Bye = Athlete not required to compete in round

Men's Track
Athlete	Event	Heat		Quarterfinal		Semifinal		Final	
Athlete	Event	Result	Rank	Result	Rank	Result	Rank	Result	Rank
Jalal Gozal	Men's 100m	11.45	5	Did not advance					

Men's High Jump
Athlete	Event	Qualification		Final	
Athlete	Event	Distance	Rank	Distance	Rank
I Gusti Putu Okamona	Men's High Jump	1.82m	27	Did not advance	
Maridjo Wirjodemedjo	Men's High Jump	1.82m	24	Did not advance	

== Fencing ==
One fencer represented Indonesia in 1956.

Men's épée

- Siha Sukarno (Round 1, rank 6 Pool 2)

Men's sabre

- Siha Sukarno (Round 1, rank 6 Pool 4)

== Football ==
Head coach: (Socialist Federal Republic of Yugoslavia) Antun Pogačnik

No.	Pos.	Player	DoB	Age	Caps	Club	Tournament games	Tournament goals	Minutes played	Sub off	Sub on	Cards yellow/red
18	FW	Achad Arifin			?	(Indonesia) PSP Padang	1		90
3	DF	Chairuddin Siregar			?	(Indonesia) Persija Jakarta	2		180
15	FW	Ashari Danoe	1932	24	?	(Indonesia) PSIS Semarang	1		90
20	FW	Jasrin Jusron			?	(Indonesia) PSIS Semarang	1		90
7	DF	Kwee Kiat Sek	11 January 1934	22	?	(Indonesia) Persib Bandung	2		180
1	GK	Maulwi Saelan	8 August 1928	28	?	(Indonesia) PSM Makassar	2		180
5	DF	Mohamed Rashjid			?	(Indonesia) PSMS Medan	2		180
19	FW	Phwa Sian Liong	3 January 1922	34	?	(Indonesia) Persebaya Surabaya	1		180
12	FW	Ramang	24 April 1928	28	?	(Indonesia) PSM Makassar	2		180
9	MF	Tan Ling Houw	26 July 1930	26	?	(Indonesia) Persija Jakarta	2		180
4	DF	Thio Him Tjiang	28 August 1929	27	?	(Indonesia) Persija Jakarta	2		180
17	FW	Aang Witarsa	3 December 1930	26	?	(Indonesia) Persib Bandung	2		180
8	MF	Ramlan Yatim	10 September 1922	34	?	(Indonesia) PSMS Medan	2		180
2	GK	Paidjo			?	(Indonesia) Persema Malang	0		0
6	DF	M. Sidhi			?	(Indonesia) Persebaya Surabaya	0		0
10	MF	Rukma Sudjana			?	(Indonesia) Persib Bandung	0		0
11	MF	Kasmoeri			?	(Indonesia) Persip Pekalongan	0		0
13	FW	Ramli Yatim			?	(Indonesia) PSMS Medan	0		0
14	FW	Djamiat Dalhar			?	(Indonesia) Persija Jakarta	0		0
16	FW	Ade Dana			?	(Indonesia) Persib Bandung	0		0
		Oros Witarsa	16 October 1916		?

First round

Indonesia	w/o ^{1}	South Vietnam

Melbourne

^{1} Egypt, South Vietnam, and Hungary withdrew.

Quarterfinals

29 November 1956
12:00

Soviet Union	0–0 (a.e.t.)	Indonesia
	Report

Olympic Park Stadium, Melbourne
Attendance: 3,228
Referee: Shigemaru Takenokoshi (Japan)
1 December 1956
12:00

Soviet Union	4–0	Indonesia
Salnikov 17' 59'; Ivanov 19'; Netto 43'	Report

Olympic Park Stadium, Melbourne
Attendance: 6,735
Referee: Reginald Lund (New Zealand)

== Shooting ==
One shooter represented Indonesia in 1956.

25 m pistol

- Lukman Saketi (30th place)

== Swimming ==
Athlete	Event	Heat		
Athlete	Event	Time	Rank	Note
Habib Nasution	Men's 100 metre freestyle	1:00.01	5 (Heat 4)	Did not advance
Habib Nasution	Men's 400 metre freestyle	4:44.00	5 (Heat 2)	Did not advance
Martha Gultom	Women's 100 metres backstroke	1:21.7	8 (Heat 3)	Did not advance
Ria Tobing	Women's 200 metres breaststroke	3:14.2	8 (Heat 2)	Did not advance

== Weightlifting ==
Athlete	Event	Military press		Snatch		Clean & Jerk		Total	Rank
Athlete	Event	Result	Rank	Result	Rank	Result	Rank	Total	Rank
Liem Kim Leng	Men's Featherweight	87.5	=18	92.5	=11	112.5	=15	292.5	15

== See also ==
- Indonesia at the Olympics
- Indonesia at the Paralympics
