= Thailand national football team results (1948–1959) =

This article provides details of international football games played by the Thailand national football team from their first international game in 1948 until 1959.

== Results ==
Key
Win
Draw
Defeat

=== 1948 ===
20 August 1948 Friendly	Thailand	1–6	Taiwan	Bangkok, Thailand
--:-- UTC+7

=== 1954 ===
1 November 1954 Friendly	Cambodia	7–1	Thailand	Phnom Penh, Cambodia
--:-- UTC+7		Report		Referee: Ly Kim Phong

=== 1956 ===
April 1956 Friendly	South Vietnam	2–1	Thailand	Saigon, South Vietnam
--:-- UTC+7				Stadium: Stade du Jardin de la Ville

April 1956 Friendly	South Vietnam	3–1	Thailand	Saigon, South Vietnam
--:-- UTC+7				Stadium: Stade du Jardin de la Ville

26 November 1956 1956 Summer Olympics	Great Britain	9–0	Thailand	Melbourne, Australia
16:30 UTC+10	Twissell 12', 20'; Lewis 21' (pen.); Laybourne 30', 82', 85'; Bromilow 75', 78'; Topp 90'	Report		Stadium: Olympic Park Stadium; Attendance: 3,693; Referee: Nikolay Latyshev (Soviet Union)

=== 1957 ===
31 August 1957 1957 Merdeka Tournament	Indonesia	4–0	Thailand	Kuala Lumpur, Malaysia
--:-- UTC+8	Omo S. 5', 12', 33', 68'			Stadium: Merdeka Stadium

1 September 1957 1957 Merdeka Tournament	Thailand	3–0	Cambodia	Kuala Lumpur, Malaysia
--:-- UTC+8	Sophon 13'; Prasun 47', 57'			Stadium: Merdeka Stadium

3 September 1957 1957 Merdeka Tournament	Singapore	6–0	Thailand	Kuala Lumpur, Malaysia
--:-- UTC+8	Corthine 12', 60'; Koh 61', 68'; Mansoor 65'; Hatch 70'			Stadium: Merdeka Stadium

5 September 1957 1957 Merdeka Tournament	Burma	5–2	Thailand	Kuala Lumpur, Malaysia
--:-- UTC+8	Gordon Samuel 27'; Styles 32'; Tun Kyi 40', 72'; 49' (o.g.)		Santan 10', 50'	Stadium: Merdeka Stadium

=== 1959 ===
30 August 1959 1960 Summer Olympics qualification	Thailand	1–3	Taiwan	Bangkok, Thailand
--:-- UTC+7		Report

13 September 1959 1960 Summer Olympics qualification	Taiwan	3–1 (6–2 agg.)	Thailand	Taipei, Taiwan
--:-- UTC+7		Report

13 December 1959 1959 SEAP Games	South Vietnam	4–0	Thailand	Bangkok, Thailand
--:-- UTC+7

14 December 1959 1959 SEAP Games	Thailand	3–1	Malaya	Bangkok, Thailand
--:-- UTC+7

15 December 1959 1959 SEAP Games	Thailand	5–2	Burma	Bangkok, Thailand
--:-- UTC+7

17 December 1959 1959 SEAP Games	South Vietnam	3–1	Thailand	Bangkok, Thailand
--:-- UTC+7	Đỗ Thới Vinh 21'; Đỗ Quang Thách (40–45); Lê Văn Tỉ (2nd half)		Sunthan 31'
