= Donald Stoker =

Donald Stoker may refer to:

- Don Stoker (1922–1985), English footballer
- Donald Stoker (historian), American military historian
