= Dexter Adams =

English footballer (1925–2015)

Personal information
- Date of birth: 4 April 1925
- Place of birth: Handsworth, West Midlands, England
- Date of death: 31 January 2015 (aged 89)
- Place of death: Stamford, Lincolnshire, England
- Position: Defender

Senior career*
Years	Team	Apps	(Gls)
?–1947	Northampton Polytechnic		
1948–1958	Hendon	308	(14)

International career
1951–?	England Amateurs	20	(0)
1956	Great Britain Olympic	Called up	

Managerial career
- 1959–1962: Hendon
- 1962–1970: Barnet
- * Club domestic league appearances and goals

Dexter Adams (4 April 1925 – 31 January 2015) was an English footballer who played as a defender. He was part of the Great Britain football squad for the 1956 Summer Olympics.

== Club career ==
Adams played for Northampton Polytechnic FC until December 1947. In January 1948, he joined Hendon. Adams stayed there 10 years, until 1958, when persistent knee troubles forced him to retire.

== International career ==
Adams had 20 caps with England Amateurs, playing his first game in February 1951 against Ireland. He was part of Great Britain Football squad for the 1956 Summer Olympics but was flown home due to an injury and didn't play any game.

== Managerial career ==
Adams started his managerial career with Hendon from 1959 to 1962. He then managed Barnet F.C. from 1962 to 1970.

== Personal life ==
Adams was an amateur football player and had jobs during his playing and managerial careers. He first worked as a surveyor. In 1957 he became sales representative in the advertisement department for the Daily Mirror. In the early 80's, he became advertisement manager of the Sporting Life until his retirement in 1990. He was married with Sheila from 1953 until his death. They had three daughters, five grandchildren and one great-grandchild.
