= Moreland FC =

Moreland was an association football (soccer) team that competed in various leagues in Victoria, Australia between 1934 and 1985. The team was also known as Moreland Victoria and as Moreland Thistle between 1965 and 1970.

After the 1985 season, Moreland merged with Park Rangers to form Moreland Park Rangers. In 1990 Moreland Park Rangers merged with Coburg to form the team now known as Moreland City.

The team played its home matches at Campbell Reserve, Coburg. In a history spanning 50 years, Moreland won the Victorian Division 1 title, then the top tier of soccer in the state, three times.

== Early success ==
In 1934 Moreland Soccer Club was formed by a breakaway from what was then known as the Brunswick Soccer Club and trophy success came to Moreland early in its history.

The team won the Victorian Division Three title in its very first season and Division Two in 1935. Despite losing just one game in 1935 it was Moreland's superior goal difference that handed them the title ahead of Navy, who finished with the same points.

The following season, 1936, Moreland won the first of its Victorian Division 1 championship titles.

Moreland topped the eight-team league finishing the season on 20 points, one ahead of Royal Caledonians. Royal Caledonians had finished on 21 points but were penalised 2 points and were, therefore, denied the title.

In 1937, Moreland won its third consecutive title and second top-tier trophy in a row finishing with 21 points, one ahead of Prahran in second.

The club also won the Dockerty Cup on four occasions, three times as Moreland and once, in 1945, as Moreland Hakoah.

The club's first Dockety Cup victory came in 1941, a 1–0 win over Prahran at Olympic Park, Melbourne.

In the first round of that year's tournament, Moreland beat Heidelberg 10–2.

The second Dockerty Cup final victory came against Box Hill in October 1945 and was followed the next season with a third Division One championship. As with its previous two championships, Moreland topped the table by just one point.

== War-time merger ==
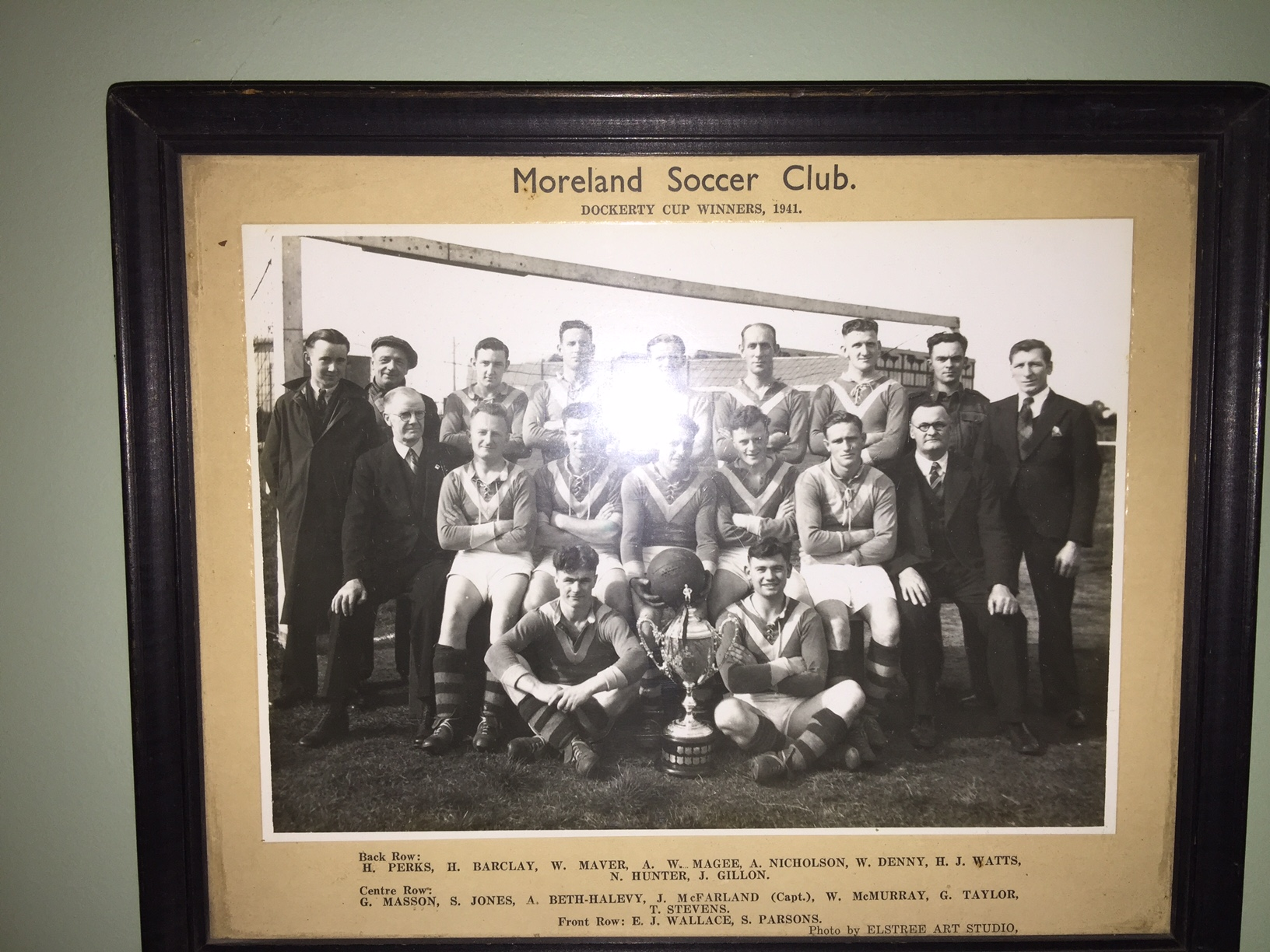
Moreland Soccer Club Dockerty Cup Winners 1941

The Dockerty Cup victory of 1945 came under the name of Moreland Hakoah. During World War II, there was a temporary merger between Moreland and Hakoah, a club who had a predominantly Jewish supporter base.

Some clubs had difficulty fielding teams during the war years while others were forced to close down because many players had left and enlisted for the armed services.

By 1946, the merger between Moreland and Hakoah came to an end with clubs again participating as separate teams.

== Relegation, promotions and consolidation ==
In 1950, Moreland finished in last place and were relegated to Division 2. They did, however, record their third Dockerty Cup triumph, beating Box Hill 2–0 in the final.

1952 brought a first division two title, the team winning 17 of its 18 games and scoring 110 league goals. They hit double figures in four games, and defeated George Cross 12–0 and 10–0.

Back in the top flight, the team consolidated its position finishing fourth in 1953, sixth in 1954, seventh in 1955 and eighth in 1956.

== Moreland's Olyroos ==
Two Moreland players, midfielder Frank Loughran and forward Ted Smith were included in Australia's 20-man soccer squad for the 1956 Summer Olympics in Melbourne. It was the very first Olympic football tournament for Australia.

Before the opening games with Japan, the squad trained at Moreland's ground. Australia also played Great Britain and Yugoslavia in a warm-up matches at Moreland, losing 3–1 and 5–1.

In their first ever Olympic soccer match, a 2–0 win over Japan, Loughran scored the second goal. This game was refereed by Mervin Rogers from Brisbane, the youngest ever international soccer referee at the age of 19.

== Demise ==
During the 1950s and 1960s, the face of Victorian soccer started to change with the ethnic clubs becoming stronger on and off the pitch. They were able to offer players, for the first time, a wage. Presidents of the powerful ethnic clubs travelled around Melbourne buying up the best players.

Moreland was a favourite target and numerous players left to play with the cashed up clubs.

Despite the decimation of the team, Moreland did win the 1957 Dockerty Cup, for the fourth and last time.

In 1962 Moreland had a written guarantee that the great Stanley Matthews would play eight games with the club. However, this deal fell through because of a FIFA ban on foreign players coming to Australia.

Eric Heath said his team had correspondence with Mathews and he "really wanted to come".

"He remembered Frank Loughran, his old sparring partner, from the Blackpool tour in 1958. You see Tommy Trinder and Harry Hopman were both patrons of the Moreland Soccer club," said Heath.

Moreland finished in second place in the league in 1957 winning promotion to the new Victorian State League for the 1958 season.

At the end of the 1962 season, the team's fifth in the State League, Moreland finished bottom, winning just one game and losing 21.

In 1968 – now known as Moreland Thistle – they were relegated from Metropolitan League Division One.

They remained in Victorian Metropolitan League Division Two – now the 3rd tier in the state – until 1978 when they finished 2nd winning promotion.

Moreland finished bottom of Division One in 1981 but were not relegated. They finished bottom again and were relegated in 1985, the final year of their existence.

When they returned in 1986 in Division Two, they had merged with Park Rangers to become Moreland Park Rangers.

== Honours ==
=== Domestic ===
==== League ====
- Victorian Division 1

Winners (3): 1936, 1937, 1946,
Runners-up (1): 1957

- Victorian Division 2

Winners (2): 1935, 1952

- Victorian Metropolitan League Division 2

Runners-up (1): 1978

==== Cups ====
- Dockerty Cup

Winners (4): 1941, 1945, 1950, 1957
Runners-up (3): 1942, 1943, 1946

== Miscellaneous ==
Otto Pecnick, the man who timed John Landy's attempts upon the mile record at Olympic Park was a treasurer of the club.

Jack Morris, who was twice mayor of Coburg was a club president in the 1950s.
