= Juan Schwanner =

Hungarian-Chilean footballer (1921–2015)

Personal information
- Full name: János Schwanner
- Date of birth: 5 February 1921
- Place of birth: Szombathely, Hungary
- Date of death: 8 May 2015 (aged 94)
- Place of death: Auckland, New Zealand

Youth career
- Szombathelyi Haladas

Senior career*
Years	Team	Apps	(Gls)
- Elektromos FC
- Budapesti Postás SE
- Flamengo
- Audax Italiano
- Colo-Colo
- Ferrocaril

Managerial career
- 1960–1961: Audax Italiano
- 1962–1963: Grazer AK
- 1963: Club Brugge
- 1967–1968: New Zealand
- 1970: Luzern
- 1970–1971: Zürich
- 1972–1974: Melbourne Hakoah
- * Club domestic league appearances and goals

Juan Schwanner, János Schwanner (5 February 1921 – 8 May 2015) was a Hungarian–Chilean football player and manager.

== Personal life ==
Schwanner was born János Schwanner in Hungary to parents of Hungarian and Chilean descent. While playing football in Chile he took up Chilean citizenship and adopted the Spanish name Juan.

== Playing career ==
After stints with Hungarian clubs Schwanner moved to Flamengo in Brazil. He later moved to Chile where he played for Audax Italiano and Colo Colo.

== Managerial career ==
Schwanner coached Grazer AK, Club Brugge, New Zealand, Luzern, Zürich and Melbourne Hakoah.
