= I Gusti Putu Oka Mona =

Indonesian high jumper

Personal information
- Full name: I Gusti Putu Oka Mona
- Nationality: Indonesian
- Born: 26 August 1930 Denpasar, Bali
- Died: 30 August 1996 (aged 66) Denpasar, Bali

Sport
- Sport: Athletics
- Event: High jump

I Gusti Putu Oka Mona (26 August 1930 – 30 August 1996) was an Indonesian high jumper. Mona would compete at the 1956 Summer Olympics in Melbourne, Australia, representing Indonesia in athletics. He would be one of the first athletes to represent the nation in the sport at a Summer Games.

At the 1956 Summer Games, he would compete in the men's high jump. In the qualifying round of the event, his last attempt would record a distance of 1.82 metres until he would not finish the event at a height of 1.88 metres. He would later set an Indonesian record in the event with a height of 1.96 metres, which would last for twenty years.

== Biography ==
I Gusti Putu Oka Mona was born on 26 August 1930. Mona would compete at the 1956 Summer Olympics in Melbourne, Australia, representing Indonesia in the men's high jump. He would be one of the first Indonesian athletes to compete in athletics at an Olympic Games.

Mona would compete in the qualifying round for the men's high jump on 23 November. There, he would clear his first attempt of 1.78 metres in one try. He would then fail a height of 1.82 metres twice until successfully clearing it on his third attempt. The bar was then raised to 1.88 metres but Mona would not finish the event and would not qualify for the finals held in the same day. He would place 27th out of the 28 athletes that competed in the qualifying round of the event. In the same year, he would set an Indonesian record in the men's high jump with a height of 1.96 metres. It would remain as the Indonesian record for twenty years.

Mona later died on 30 August 1996 in Denpasar, Bali, at the age of 66.
