= Fritz Semmelmann =

German footballer

Personal information
- Date of birth: 24 July 1928
- Place of birth: Bayreuth, Germany
- Date of death: 17 June 2011 (aged 82)
- Place of death: Bayreuth, Germany

International career
Years	Team	Apps	(Gls)
- West Germany

Fritz Semmelmann (24 July 1928 – 17 June 2011) was a German footballer. He competed in the men's tournament at the 1956 Summer Olympics.
