= Surapong Chutimawong =

Thai footballer

Personal information
- Position: Defender

International career
| Years | Team | Apps | (Gls) |
- Thailand

Surapong Chutimawong was a Thai footballer. He competed in the men's tournament at the 1956 Summer Olympics.
