= Kasem Baikam =

Thai footballer

Personal information
- Date of birth: 1932 (age 93–94)

International career
Years	Team	Apps	(Gls)
- Thailand

Kasem Baikam (born 1932) is a Thai footballer. He competed in the men's tournament at the 1956 Summer Olympics.
