= Bumphen Luttimol =

Thai footballer (1930–2016)

Personal information
- Date of birth: 21 September 1930
- Place of birth: Ubon Ratchathani, Thailand
- Date of death: 28 October 2016 (aged 86)
- Place of death: Ubon Ratchathani, Thailand
- Position: Forward

International career
| Years | Team | Apps | (Gls) |
- Thailand

Bumphen Luttimol (21 September 1930 – 28 October 2016) was a Thai footballer. He competed in the men's tournament at the 1956 Summer Olympics.
