= Sukit Chitranukhroh =

Thai footballer

Personal information
- Date of birth: 1928
- Place of birth: Bangkok, Thailand
- Date of death: November 2007 (aged 78–79)
- Position: Forward

International career
Years	Team	Apps	(Gls)
- Thailand

Sukit Chitranukhroh (1928 – November 2007) was a Thai footballer. He competed in the men's tournament at the 1956 Summer Olympics.
