= Prasan Suvannasith =

Thai footballer

Personal information
- Date of birth: 7 October 1933
- Place of birth: Songkhla, Thailand
- Date of death: 6 April 2016 (aged 82)
- Position: Defender

International career
Years	Team	Apps	(Gls)
- Thailand

Prasan Suvannasith (7 October 1933 – 6 April 2016) was a Thai footballer. He competed in the men's tournament at the 1956 Summer Olympics.
