= Samroeng Chaiyong =

Thai footballer and coach (1933/34–2019)

Samroeng Chaiyong (Thai: สำเริง ไชยยงค์), born Samruay Chaiyong (สำรวย ไชยยงค์, 12 February 1933/34 (Note: His birth year is reported as 2476 in the Buddhist Era, the months January–March of which may correspond either to the year 1933 or 1934, depending on the convention used.) – 11 March 2019), was a Thai football player and coach, army major-general, and royal courtier.

== Biography ==
Samroeng was born Samruay in Selaphum District, Roi Et Province. He attended school in Roi Et before receiving a scholarship to study at the Institute of Physical Education in Bangkok, graduating to become an instructor at the institute.

Samroeng was a member of the Thailand national team that competed in its first Olympic football competition in 1956. He was later chosen by the Football Association of Thailand to attend a coaching course in Germany in 1961, after which he received a royal scholarship to complete pro-licence training at the German Sport University Cologne. Upon returning to Thailand in 1963, he coached for Bangkok Bank F.C. for two seasons. In 1968, he established the Rajvithi Football Club, which became one of the most successful Thai clubs in the 1970s, and helped to train a generation of Thai national team players, including five of his younger brothers.

As a football instructor at Chitralada School, he coached Prince Vajiralongkorn (later the king), and was named an army officer in the King's Guard and served as a guardian of the Prince during his studies at the Royal Military College, Duntroon in Australia. He continued to serve the Royal Family throughout his career, and was named a special advisor to the Bureau of the Royal Household. Samroeng was married to Khunying Phensi Chaiyong, with two daughters. He died of diabetic ketoacidosis in Bangkok on 11 March 2019, at the age of 86.
