= Mikhail Bozenenkov =

Soviet football manager

Personal information
- Full name: Mikhail Georgievich Bozenenkov
- Date of birth: 21 January 1921
- Place of birth: Roslavl, Russian SFSR
- Date of death: 10 January 1994 (aged 72)
- Place of death: Minsk, Belarus

Managerial career
- Years: Team
- 1950–1951: Dinamo Minsk (assistant)
- 1952–1955: Spartak Minsk
- 1956: Belarusian SSR
- 1958–1959: Spartak Minsk
- 1961–1963: Burma

Mikhail Georgievich Bozenenkov (Russian: Михаил Бозененков; 21 January 1921 – 10 January 1994) was a Soviet football manager.

== Early life ==
Bozenenkov was born in 1921 in Roslavl. He suffered a football playing career-ending injury at the age of eighteen.

== Career ==
In 1952, Bozenenkov was appointed manager of Spartak Minsk. In 1956, he was appointed manager of Belarusian SSR team for the 1956 Spartakiad. In 1958, he returned to Spartak Minsk. In 1961, he was appointed manager of the Burma national football team. He helped the team achieve second place at the 1961 SEAP Games.

== Personal life ==
Bozenenkov was nicknamed "Pirate". He served in the Soviet military.
