= John Carden (soccer) =

American soccer player (1931–1997)

Personal information
- Date of birth: May 10, 1931
- Place of birth: Liverpool, England
- Date of death: September 7, 1997 (aged 66)
- Place of death: Los Angeles, California, U.S.
- Position: Midfielder

International career
Years	Team	Apps	(Gls)
1956	United States	0	(0)

John Carden (May 10, 1931 – September 7, 1997) was an English-born member of the U.S. soccer team at the 1956 Summer Olympics.

Carden, a graduate of the University of Southern California, did not enter the lone U.S. game of the tournament, a 9–1 loss to Yugoslavia. At the time, he was a private in the United States Army assigned to Fort McPherson.

Carden died in Los Angeles on September 7, 1997, at the age of 66.
