= Vivathana Milinthachinda =

Thai footballer

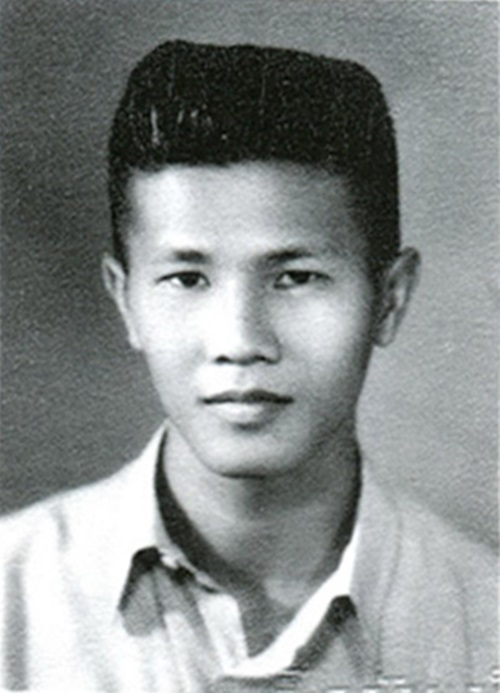

Personal information
- Full name: Vivathana Milinthachinda
- Date of birth: 5 February 1923
- Place of birth: Bangkok, Siam
- Date of death: 27 April 2003 (aged 80)
- Place of death: Thailand
- Position: Forward

Youth career
- Assumption FC
- Thammasat University

International career
Years	Team	Apps	(Gls)
1947–1957	Thailand	?	(?)

Managerial career
- 1959–1965: Thammasat University

Vivathana Milinthachinda, also spelled Wiwat Milinthachinda (Thai: วิวัฒน์ มิลินทจินดา, 5 February 1923 – 27 April 2003) was a Thai former referee and footballer. He competed in the men's tournament at the 1956 Summer Olympics.
