= Frank McIver =

Australian soccer player, coach, and administrator

Personal information
- Full name: Francis Walker McIver
- Date of birth: 1904
- Place of birth: Newcastle upon Tyne, England
- Date of death: 5 February 1978 (aged 73–74)
- Place of death: Hervey Bay, Queensland, Australia
- Position: Forward

Senior career*
| Years | Team | Apps | (Gls) |
| 1921–1923 | Seaton Delaval Presbyterians | | |
| 1929–1933 | Preston | | |
| 1934–1938 | Hakoah | | |
| 1939 | Yallourn | | |
| 1940–1941 | Hakoah | | |
| 1942–1944 | Moreland-Hakoah | | |
| 1945 | Prahran City | | |
| 1946 | South Yarra | | |
| 1947 | Brighton | | |
| 1948 | Yallourn | | |
| 1952 | Morwell | | |

International career
| 1938 | Australia | 1 | (0) |
- * Club domestic league appearances and goals

Francis Walker McIver (1904 – 5 February 1978) was an Australian soccer player, coach and administrator. A prolific forward, he represented Victoria and Australia. He was an inaugural inductee into the Football Federation Australia Hall of Fame in 1999 and inducted into the Football Victoria Hall of Fame in 2016.

== Early life ==
McIver was born in Cramlington just north of Newcastle upon Tyne in 1904. At age 13, he left school to work as a coal miner.

== Career ==
=== Club career ===
After establishing a reputation as a skilled street footballer, he commenced his playing career as a 17-year-old for Seaton Delaval Presbyterians in the Blyth and District League in 1921-22. He was the leading scorer for the club in his first season, doubling his tally in 1922-23. In a stretch of five matches, he scored 27 goals, scoring nine in a single match.

After the General Strike in 1926, McIver migrated to Australia in January 1927, settling as a farmer in the Mallee region of Victoria, where to his disappointment, he learned that his beloved football was nowhere to be played. He was introduced to Australian rules football, and played for two seasons in the region, but after a move to Bendigo in 1929, an advertisement from the Melbourne based Preston Soccer Club seeking new players inspired him to take up soccer in his adopted homeland.

Despite the distance between Bendigo and Melbourne, McIver travelled every Saturday to play. After a hat-trick in his first match for the Reserves, McIver was elevated to the senior team, where he would play throughout his time with the club. He scored 21 league goals for Preston in 1931, and his season tally was 23 in 1932. Earning promotion, the step up to the Victorian First Division did little to curtail his scoring exploits, with another stellar season as the league's leading goalscorer in 1933 earning Preston a healthy position in the top half of the table.

McIver moved to Hakoah in 1934, where his knack for scoring was rewarded with the ultimate success, the club claiming the premiership with a seven-point margin and just a single loss throughout the season. Although the title race was tighter in 1935, McIver’s tally of goals ensured that he would top the goalscoring leaderboard for a third successive season and Hakoah would claim successive premierships and the League-Cup double to cement itself as the most successful club in Victoria that decade. He would score over 60 goals in all competitions in 1935, setting an all-time First Division record by scoring a remarkable 10 goals in a single match as Hakoah defeated Melbourne Thistle 17-1.

McIver returned to England for a period in 1936, but reprised his role in the Hakoah forward line later that year. Hakoah claimed its fifth premiership in eight seasons in 1938, McIver again amongst the league's top scorers. With the Second World War looming, Hakoah would amalgamate with Moreland and the combined entity would claim honours in the league in 1943, with McIver excelling once more as the central forward.

As the War drew to a close in 1945, McIver, now in his forties, would spend his final seasons in the Victorian First Division playing for a host of clubs, scoring as many as 24 goals for Prahran City in 1945. He moved to South Yarra in 1946, netting just three times in an abbreviated season. At 43, and with another move, this time to Brighton in 1947, his league debut for the club was announced with a double hat-trick in a 7-0 victory. That season yielded 24 goals and despite relocating to Morwell, he would return to the top flight as Player-Coach with Yallourn in 1948.

McIver would play for Morwell in the newly formed Latrobe Valley Soccer League, his final season as a player in 1952. At the age of 48, helped Morwell to win the "triple crown" - the Battle of Britain Cup, the Advertiser Shield and the Ingram Cup.

=== International career ===
While playing for Preston in the Victorian Second Division, his prolific scoring earned him his first representative honours, rewarded with a spot on the Australia tour of the Dutch East Indies. He scored on his debut against Tiong Hwa in a 4-0 victory and made a further three appearances on tour. McIver nabbed a brace while representing Victoria against India in a 4-2 win in 1938, which led to national selection on home soil and his solitary 'A' appearance for Australia, playing the full match in the final leg of India's tour of Australia at the Melbourne Cricket Ground.

=== Full international caps and goals ===
Scores and results list Australia's goal tally first.

| # | Date | Venue | Opponent | Result | Goals | Competition |
|---|---|---|---|---|---|---|
| 1 | 1938-10-01 | Melbourne | India | 3–1 | 0 | Friendly match |

== Post career ==
=== Administrative career ===
McIver's first role as an administrator was while as a player with Preston, where in 1930 he helped establish a Schoolboys league. He was appointed to the Victorian State Team selection committee in 1951, a short-lived role as he returned to Morwell later that year. Upon his retirement, he assumed the role of Secretary of the Latrobe Valley Association, a role he managed for six years before becoming President and Publicity Officer, a position he held until at least 1964, before retirement ultimately saw him relocate to Queensland.

=== Death ===
McIver died in Hervey Bay, Queensland, on February 5, 1978.

=== Posthumous recognition ===
McIver was made a Life Member of the Victorian Soccer Federation in 1967.

The foundation of a Hall of Fame by the then Soccer Australia was commemorated with an inauguration ceremony on 28 February 1999. McIver was inducted to the Roll of Honour as a member for meritorious contribution.

On 9 September 2016 McIver was inducted in the Football Victoria Hall of Fame.

== Honours ==
=== Individual ===
- Football Federation Australia Hall of Fame inaugural Inductee: 1999
- Football Victoria Hall of Fame Inductee: 1999
- Victorian First Division leading goalscorer: 1933, 1934, 1935, 1942, 1943, 1945

=== Club ===
Hakoah

- Victorian First Division Champions: 1934, 1935, 1938
- Dockerty Cup: 1935

Moreland-Hakoah

- Victorian First Division Champions: 1943

Prahran City

- Victorian First Division Champions: 1945
