= Jerry Haldi =

Israeli footballer and manager (1935–2019)

Personal information
- Full name: Moshe "Jerry" Haldi
- Date of birth: 14 August 1935
- Place of birth: Paris, France
- Date of death: 8 September 2019 (aged 84)
- Place of death: Sydney, Australia

Youth career
- Hapoel Haifa
- 1950–1952: Hapoel Petah Tikva

Senior career*
Years	Team	Apps	(Gls)
1952–1961	Hapoel Petah Tikva	153	(3)
1961–1963	Hakoah Sydney		
1964–1966	Melbourne Hakoah	36	(6)
1966–1968	Hapoel Petah Tikva	38	(1)

International career
1956–1960	Israel	10	(0)

Managerial career
- Hapoel Ramla
- 1970–1972: Hapoel Ashdod
- 1972–1973: Hapoel Marmorek
- 1973: Hakoah Sydney (reserves)
- 1976–1979: Hakoah Sydney
- 1980: West Adelaide Hellas
Medal record
Men's football
Representing Israel
AFC Asian Cup
Runner-up	1956 Hong Kong
- * Club domestic league appearances and goals

Jerry Haldi (Hebrew: ג'רי האלדי; 14 August 1935 – 8 September 2019), also known as Gerry Haldi or Gerry Chaldi, was an Israeli football player and manager.

== Personal life ==
Gerry Chaldi was born on 14 August 1935 in Paris, France. He had two children from his first marriage, and one child from his second marriage. He had two grandchildren from his eldest child.

== Death ==
He died in Sydney on 8 September 2019 after a brief illness.

== Honours ==
=== As player ===
Hapoel Petah Tikva

- Israeli Championship: 1955, 1958–59, 1959–60, 1960–61; Runner-up, 1955–56, 1956–57, 1957–58, 1966–68
- Israel State Cup: 1957; Runner-up, 1955, 1959, 1961
- Israeli Supercup: Runner-up, 1957

Melbourne Hakoah

- New South Wales Federation Championship: 1961, 1962
- New South Wales Federation Cup: 1961, 1963

Israel

- AFC Asian Cup: Runner-up, 1956

=== As a manager ===
Hakoah Sydney

- National Soccer League: 1977; Runner-up, 1978
- NSL Manager of the Year: 1978
