= Suchart Mutugun =

Thai footballer (born 1934)

Personal information
- Date of birth: April 7, 1934
- Date of death: c. 2012
- Position: Forward

International career
| Years | Team | Apps | (Gls) |
- Thailand

Suchart Mutugun (7 April 1934 - before 2012) was a Thai former footballer. He competed in the men's tournament at the 1956 Summer Olympics.
