= William Rae (Hamilton) =

Scottish footballer

Personal information
- Place of birth: Scotland
- Position: Winger

Youth career
- Torrance Youth Club

Senior career*
| Years | Team | Apps | (Gls) |
| 1965 | Partick Thistle | | |
| 1966–1967 | Hamilton Academical | 6 | (0) |
| 1967–1968 | Bearsden Amateurs | | |
| 1968 | Kilsyth Rangers | | |
- Melbourne Hakoah
| 1974 | Albion Rovers | | |
- * Club domestic league appearances and goals

William Rae is a Scottish former footballer. Rae played six matches for Hamilton Academical in the 1966–1967 season.
