= Prateep Chermudhai =

Thai footballer (born 1923)

Personal information
- Date of birth: 1923
- Date of death: before 2012
- Position: Forward

International career
Years	Team	Apps	(Gls)
- Thailand

Prateep Chermudhai (1923 – before 2012) was a Thai footballer. He competed in the men's tournament at the 1956 Summer Olympics. Chermudhai died before 2012.
