= Ramlan Yatim =

Indonesian footballer (born 1922–1997)

Personal information
- Date of birth: 10 September 1922
- Place of birth: Tebing Tinggi, Dutch East Indies
- Date of death: November 10, 1997 (age 77)
- Position: Midfielder

Senior career*
Years	Team	Apps	(Gls)
1948	Penang		
1949–1950	Singapore FA		
1950–1967	PSMS Medan		

International career
- Indonesia
- * Club domestic league appearances and goals

Ramlan Yatim (10 September 1922 - 10 November 1997) was an Indonesian former footballer. He competed in the men's tournament at the 1956 Summer Olympics. He also became the first Indonesian player abroad after joined Malaysian club Penang in 1948 and joined Singapore FA in 1949.
