= Chairuddin Siregar =

Indonesian footballer (born 1929)

Personal information
- Date of birth: 7 August 1929
- Position: Defender

Senior career*
Years	Team	Apps	(Gls)
- Persija Jakarta

International career
- Indonesia
- * Club domestic league appearances and goals

Chairuddin Siregar (born 7 August 1929) was an Indonesian footballer. He competed in the men's tournament at the 1956 Summer Olympics.
