= Jim Dorrian =

American soccer player (born 1931)

Personal information
- Full name: James Patrick Dorrian
- Date of birth: March 6, 1931 (age 95)
- Place of birth: Queens, New York, U.S.
- Height: 5 ft 9 in (1.75 m)
- Position: Left-half

Senior career*
Years	Team	Apps	(Gls)
- Danish F.C.
- Brookhattan

International career
1956	United States	1	(0)
- * Club domestic league appearances and goals

James Patrick Dorrian (born March 6, 1931), also known as George Dorian in some sources, is an American soccer player who was a member of the U.S. soccer team at the 1956 Summer Olympics. At the time of the tournament, he played for Danish F.C. in the National Soccer League of New York. He later played for Brookhattan.
