= Jasrin Jusron =

Indonesian footballer

Personal information
- Date of birth: 2 February 1936 (age 90)
- Position: Forward

Senior career*
Years	Team	Apps	(Gls)
- PSIS Semarang

International career
- Indonesia
- * Club domestic league appearances and goals

Jasrin Jusron (born 2 February 1936) was an Indonesian footballer. He competed in the men's tournament at the 1956 Summer Olympics.
