= Anatoli Porkhunov =

Soviet footballer

Personal information
- Full name: Anatoli Nikolayevich Porkhunov
- Date of birth: 28 July 1928
- Place of birth: Moscow, USSR
- Date of death: 1 June 1992 (aged 63)
- Place of death: Moscow, Russia
- Position: Defender

Senior career*
Years	Team	Apps	(Gls)
1949–1952	VVS Moscow		
1952	MVO Moscow		
1952	CSKA Moscow		
1953	FC Lokomotiv Moscow		
1954–1957	CSKA Moscow		
1958–1962	GSVG		

International career
1955	USSR	3	(0)
- * Club domestic league appearances and goals

Anatoli Nikolayevich Porkhunov (Russian: Анатолий Николаевич Порхунов; 28 July 1928 – 1 June 1992) was a Soviet football player. He was part of the Soviet Union's squad for the 1956 Summer Olympics, but he did not play in any matches.

== Honours ==
- Soviet Cup winner: 1955.

== International career ==
Porkhunov made his debut for USSR on 21 August 1955, in a friendly against West Germany.
