= Siegbert Wirth =

American soccer player

Siegbert M. Wirth
Personal information
- Date of birth: October 26, 1929
- Date of death: October 12, 1999 (aged 69)
- Position: Defender

Youth career
- Years: Team
- 1950, 1952–1955: Syracuse University

Siegbert M. Wirth (October 26, 1929 – October 12, 1999) was a U.S. soccer player who was a member of the U.S. soccer team at the 1956 Summer Olympics. He played his college soccer at Syracuse University in 1950 and then again from 1952 to 1955. Following his graduation from Syracuse, he entered the U.S. military. While he was a member of the Olympic soccer team, he did not enter a game during the tournament. In 1990, he took over as head coach of the Mynderse Academy Varsity Boys Soccer Team where he took a team that won 2 games the previous season to the league championship. He coached Mynderse for the next 6 years.
