= Kwee Kiat Sek =

Indonesian footballer

Personal information
- Date of birth: 11 January 1934
- Place of birth: Batavia, Dutch East Indies
- Date of death: 30 August 2001 (aged 67)
- Place of death: Jakarta, Indonesia
- Positions: Defender; centre half

Youth career
- 1950–1951: UMS 1905

Senior career*
Years	Team	Apps	(Gls)
1952–1957	Persija Jakarta	24	
1957–1959	Persib Bandung	6	(3)
1960–1962	Persija Jakarta	6	(1)

International career
1951–1958	Indonesia	22	(0)
Medal record
Men's football
Representing Indonesia
Asian Games
Bronze medal – third place	1958 Tokyo
- * Club domestic league appearances and goals

Kwee Kiat Sek (11 January 1934 – 30 August 2001) was an Indonesian footballer. He competed in the men's tournament at the 1956 Summer Olympics. Apart from being a footballer, he was also a dentist.

== Honours ==
Persija Jakarta

- Perserikatan: 1953–1954

Indonesia

- Merdeka Tournament: 1961
- Asian Games (bronze) Bronze medal: 1958
