= Dobrosav Krstić =

Serbian footballer

Personal information
- Date of birth: 5 February 1932
- Place of birth: Novi Sad, Kingdom of Yugoslavia
- Date of death: 3 May 2015 (aged 83)
- Place of death: Novi Sad, Serbia
- Height: 1.78 m (5 ft 10 in)
- Position: Defender

Youth career
- Slavija Novi Sad
- 1950–1951: Vojvodina

Senior career*
Years	Team	Apps	(Gls)
1951–1962	Vojvodina	194	(23)
1962–1966	Sochaux	97	(2)
1966	Rouen	1	(0)
Total		292	(25)

International career
1955–1960	Yugoslavia	30	(1)

Managerial career
- 1967–1969: Sochaux
Medal record
Silver medal – second place	Olympic Games	1956
- * Club domestic league appearances and goals

Dobrosav Krstić (Serbian Cyrillic: Добросав Крстић; 5 February 1932 – 3 May 2015) was a Yugoslav and Serbian football manager and player.

== Career ==
Krstić played with Vojvodina for over a decade (1951–1962), collecting 194 appearances and scoring 23 goals in the Yugoslav First League. He subsequently moved abroad to France and joined Sochaux, spending the next four seasons at the club. After a brief spell at Rouen, Krstić retired from the game.

At international level, Krstić was capped 30 times for Yugoslavia between 1955 and 1960, while scoring once. He was a member of the team that won the silver medal at the 1956 Summer Olympics, but also represented the country at the 1958 FIFA World Cup. His final international was an October 1960 friendly match away against Hungary.

After hanging up his boots, Krstić served as manager of Sochaux from 1967 to 1969. He died in May 2015.

== Honours ==
Yugoslavia

- Olympic Games: Silver Medal 1956
