= Herbert Dodkins =

English footballer

Personal information
- Full name: Herbert Edward Dodkins
- Date of birth: 20 December 1929
- Place of birth: Epping, England
- Date of death: 18 January 2014 (aged 84)
- Position: Midfielder

Senior career*
Years	Team	Apps	(Gls)
- Ilford

International career
1956	Great Britain	2	(0)
- * Club domestic league appearances and goals

Herbert Edward Dodkins (20 December 1929 – 18 January 2014) was an English footballer who represented Great Britain at the 1956 Summer Olympics. Dodkins played as an amateur for Ilford.
