= Ljubiša Spajić =

Serbian footballer and manager

Ljuba Spajić
Personal information
- Full name: Ljubiša Spajić
- Date of birth: 7 March 1926
- Place of birth: Belgrade, Kingdom of Yugoslavia
- Date of death: March 28, 2004 (aged 78)
- Place of death: Belgrade, Serbia and Montenegro
- Position: Defender

Senior career*
Years	Team	Apps	(Gls)
1946–1947	Red Star Belgrade	8	(0)
1947–1949	Budućnost Titograd		
1950–1952	BSK Beograd	59	(7)
1952–1960	Red Star Belgrade	153	(1)

International career
1950–1957	Yugoslavia	15	(0)

Managerial career
- 1961–1962: Aris Thessaloniki
- 1962: Turkey
- 1962–1963: Beşiktaş
- 1964–1967: Beşiktaş
- 1968–1969: Olympiacos
- 1969–1971: Iraklis
- 1972–1974: Panachaiki
- 1974–1975: Iraklis
- 1976–1977: Panachaiki
- 1978: Panachaiki
Medal record
Men's Football
Representing Yugoslavia
Olympic Games
Silver medal – second place	1956 Melbourne	Team
- * Club domestic league appearances and goals

Ljubiša "Ljuba" Spajić (Serbian Cyrillic: Љубиша Љуба Спајић; 7 March 1926 – 28 March 2004) was a Serbian footballer who was part of Yugoslavia national football team at the 1954 FIFA World Cup and the 1956 Summer Olympics. He later became a manager.

== International career ==
On the national level, Spajić made his debut for Yugoslavia in a September 1950 friendly match away against Finland, coming on as a 68th-minute substitute for Marko Valok, and earned a total of 15 caps (no goals). His final international was a November 1957 World Cup qualification match against Greece.
