= Ivan Mozer =

Soviet footballer (1933–2006)

Personal information
- Full name: Ivan Ivanovich Mozer
- Date of birth: 21 December 1933
- Place of birth: Mukačevo, Czechoslovakia
- Date of death: 2 November 2006 (aged 72)
- Place of death: Moscow, Russia
- Height: 1.70 m (5 ft 7 in)
- Position: Midfielder

Youth career
- 1946–1949: Dynamo Mukachevo
- 1950: Bolshevik Mukachevo

Senior career*
Years	Team	Apps	(Gls)
1951	Spartak Uzhgorod	9	(1)
1952–1955	Spartak Minsk	55	(6)
1956–1961	Spartak Moscow	96	(31)
1961–1966	Dinamo Minsk	117	(9)

International career
1956	USSR	4	(1)

Managerial career
- 1968: FShM Moscow
- 1969: Shinnik Yaroslavl (assistant)
- 1969: Shinnik Yaroslavl
- 1970–1973: Dinamo Minsk
- 1975–1976: Dynamo Moscow (director)
- 1979–1980: Dynamo Moscow (assistant)
- 1984–1985: Dynamo Moscow (director)
- 1985–1987: Dynamo Moscow (assistant)
- 1993–1995: Dynamo-Gazovik Tyumen (assistant)
- 1996–2006: Dynamo Moscow (technical director)
- * Club domestic league appearances and goals

Ivan Ivanovich Mozer (Ukrainian: Іван Іванович Мозер, Russian: Иван Иванович Мозер; born 21 December 1933 in Mukachevo; died 2 November 2006 in Moscow) was a Soviet football player, coach and director.

== Honours ==
- Soviet Top League winner: 1956, 1958.
- Soviet Cup winner: 1958.

== International career ==
Mozer made his debut for USSR on 1 July 1956 in a friendly against Denmark.
