= Sophon Hayachanta =

Thai footballer

Personal information
- Date of birth: 1933 (age 92–93)

International career
Years	Team	Apps	(Gls)
- Thailand

Sophon Hayachanta (Thai: โสภณ หะยาจันทา; born 1933) is a Thai civil engineer and amateur footballer. He attended Debsirin School, and competed in the men's tournament at the 1956 Summer Olympics.
