= Sava Antić =

Serbian footballer and manager

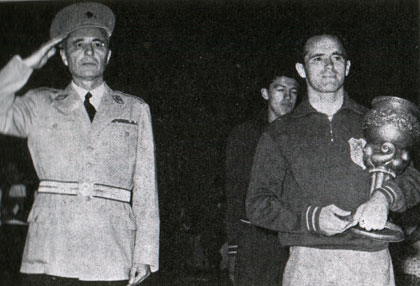

Personal information
- Date of birth: 1 March 1930
- Place of birth: Belgrade, Kingdom of Yugoslavia
- Date of death: July 26, 1998 (aged 68)
- Position: Striker

Senior career*
Years	Team	Apps	(Gls)
1947–1948	Brodarac		
1948–1950	Red Star Belgrade	10	(4)
1951–1963	OFK Beograd	204	(60)

International career
1956	Yugoslavia	5	(2)

Managerial career
- 1963–1964: OFK Beograd
Medal record
Men's Football
Representing Yugoslavia
Olympic Games
Silver medal – second place	1956 Melbourne	Team
- * Club domestic league appearances and goals

Sava Antić (Serbian Cyrillic: Сава Антић; 1 March 1930 – 26 July 1998) was a Serbian football player and manager.

== Club career ==
He won the Yugoslav Cup 3 times, in 1953, 1955, and 1962, being the scorer in all the 3 cup finals. He started his career as a football player in FK Brodarac. In 1948 he moved to Red Star where he played 36 games and scored 22 goals. The highlight of his playing career started in 1950, when he decided to wear the Blue-White jersey of OFK Beograd where he played until 1963. During that period, he played 520 games and scored 184 goals in official matches. In his entire career he has never been sent off.

== International career ==
Antić played for the youth national team from 1953 to 1956, scoring 7 times in 9 matches. He was later a member of the B national team for which he scored 6 goals in 10 games.

He made his senior debut for Yugoslavia in an April 1956 friendly match against Romania, coming on as a 30th-minute substitute for Stjepan Bobek, and earned a total of 5 caps, scoring 2 goals. His final international was in December the same year against Indonesia.

He was also a member of the Olympic national team, during the Olympic Games in Melbourne, where Yugoslavia won the silver medal. He was one of the best forwards at that period, but was unfortunate to play in the glory days of Rajko Mitić, the legend of Red Star and Yugoslav football. For this reason, he was not given a real chance in the national team.

After his career as a player, he became a coach in OFK Belgrade.

== Death ==
Sava died in 1998.
