= Niyazbey Dzyapshipa =

Soviet footballer

Personal information
- Date of birth: 14 November 1927
- Place of birth: Ochamchire, Abkhazia, Georgia
- Date of death: 5 January 1993 (aged 65)
- Place of death: Tbilisi, Georgia
- Height: 1.77 m (5 ft 10 in)
- Position: Defender

Senior career*
Years	Team	Apps	(Gls)
1945	FC Dinamo Sukhumi		
1946–1958	FC Dinamo Tbilisi	214	(2)
- * Club domestic league appearances and goals

Niyazbey "Niyazi" Aleksandrovich Dzyapshipa (Russian: Ниязбей Александрович Дзяпшипа; 14 November 1927 – 5 January 1993) was a Soviet association football defender from Abkhazia, Georgia. He took up football at a late age of 16 in 1943, and spent most of his career playing as a central defender for Dinamo Tbilisi, finishing second in the Soviet national championships in 1953 and third in 1947 and 1950. He played 20 matches for the Soviet national team. After retiring from competitions he worked as a coach for Dinamo Tbilisi (1969–1970) and Dinamo Sukhumi (1984).
