= Ted Smith (soccer) =

Australian soccer player and coach

Personal information
- Full name: Edward Smith
- Date of birth: 24 September 1935 (age 91)
- Position: Winger

Senior career*
Years	Team	Apps	(Gls)
1961–1964	South Melbourne		
1965–?	Melbourne Hakoah		

International career
1956	Australia	2	(0)

Managerial career
- South Melbourne
- * Club domestic league appearances and goals

Edward "Ted" Smith (born 24 September 1935) is an Australian former soccer player and coach.

Between 1961 and 1964 Smith played for South Melbourne in the Victorian State League. He moved to Melbourne Hakoah in 1965.

Smith represented Australia at the 1956 Olympic Games.
