= Melbourne Hakoah =

- Full name: Melbourne Hakoah
- Nickname: Hakoah
- Founded: 1927
- Dissolved: 1983
- Ground: Middle Park
- Capacity: 18,000
- League: Victorian State League

Melbourne Hakoah is a defunct Australian sports club which had a predominantly Jewish Australian supporter base, akin to Hakoah Vienna.

== History ==
The club was founded in 1927, and within a decade was one of the leading sides in the Victorian First Division. The club broke ground by becoming the first successful non-Anglo migrant backed club in the state, laying the foundation for the dominance of other migrant run clubs after World War II.

While the club was unable to win a league title post-war, it still managed several victories in the Dockerty Cup, including four consecutive titles in the 1950s.

Gradually, the club's supporter base dwindled due to assimilation and lack of renewal from younger supporters, and it eventually merged with South Melbourne's Victorian league reserve side in the early 1980s.

== Honours ==
- Victorian Premier League titles: 4
  - 1934, 1935, 1938, 1943
- Dockerty Cup titles: 8
  - 1935, 1945, 1953, 1954, 1955, 1956, 1966, 1973 (As Hakoah-St Kilda)

== Notable players ==
- George Keith
- Jim Armstrong
- Ted Smith
- Dick van Alphen
- Jack Reilly
- Bobby Collins
- Juan Schwanner
- William Rae (Hamilton)
- Tom Jack
- Jerry Haldi
- Frank McIver
- Mike Micevski
- Brian Harvey
- Josip Picioane
- Jimmy O'Neil
