= Mohamed Rashjid =

Indonesian footballer

Personal information
- Date of birth: 15 August 1929
- Position: Defender

Senior career*
Years	Team	Apps	(Gls)
- PSMS Medan

International career
- Indonesia
- * Club domestic league appearances and goals

Mohamed Rashjid (born 15 August 1929) was an Indonesian former footballer. He competed in the men's tournament at the 1956 Summer Olympics.
