= Zlatko Papec =

Croatian footballer (1934–2013)

Personal information
- Date of birth: 17 January 1934
- Place of birth: Zagreb, Kingdom of Yugoslavia
- Date of death: 3 February 2013 (aged 79)
- Place of death: Split, Croatia
- Position: Forward

Youth career
- Lokomotiva Zagreb

Senior career*
Years	Team	Apps	(Gls)
1952–1955	Lokomotiva Zagreb	57	(20)
1956–1964	Hajduk Split	177	(55)
1964–1968	Freiburger FC	130	(10)
1968–1969	Rijeka	4	(0)
1971–1972	Junak Sinj		
Total		368	(85)

International career
1953–1956	Yugoslavia	6	(4)
Medal record
Representing Yugoslavia
Men's Football
Silver medal – second place	1956 Melbourne	Team
- * Club domestic league appearances and goals

Zlatko Papec (17 January 1934 – 3 February 2013) was a Croatian footballer.

== Club career ==
He began his career playing as a left winger at Zagreb's Lokomotiva, at the time when the club was a regular member of the Yugoslav First League, and was part of the greatest attacking lineup in the history of the club, alongside Josip Odžak, Vladimir Čonč, Vladimir Firm and Drago Hmelina. Papec appeared in 57 league matches for Lokomotiva in the period from 1952 to 1955, when he was conscripted and then served the compulsory military service in the Yugoslav Navy.

After leaving the navy he joined Hajduk Split in 1956 and stayed with the club until 1964. In this period he appeared in a total of 366 matches and scored 167 goals (including 177 appearances and 55 goals in the First League). In 1964 he moved abroad and joined second level West German side Freiburger FC, where he established himself as a first team regular immediately upon arrival and appeared in 130 matches in his four seasons with club. In 1968, he returned to Yugoslavia and briefly joined NK Rijeka. He had effectively retired in the late 1960s, although he later returned to the pitch and had a brief stint with second-level side NK Junak Sinj in the 1971–1972 season.

== International career ==
Papec was capped for Yugoslavia six times between 1953 and 1956. He made his debut on 14 May 1953 in a friendly against Belgium played at Heysel Stadium and his last international game was a friendly against Indonesia held on 23 December 1956 in Jakarta. He was also a member of the Yugoslav squad which reached the quarter-finals at the 1954 World Cup and was part of the Yugoslav team which won silver medal at the 1956 Summer Olympics in Melbourne.

=== International goals ===
#	Date	Venue	Opponent	Score	Result	Competition
1.	28 November 1956	Olympic Park Stadium, Melbourne, Australia	United States	9–1	Win	1956 Summer Olympics
2.	4 December 1956	Melbourne Cricket Ground, Melbourne, Australia	India	4–1	Win	1956 Summer Olympics
3.	4 December 1956	Melbourne Cricket Ground, Melbourne, Australia	India	4–1	Win	1956 Summer Olympics
4.	23 December 1956	Gelora Senayan Main Stadium, Jakarta, Indonesia	Indonesia	1–5	Win	Friendly
Correct as of 27 February 2016
