= Siha Sukarno =

Indonesian fencer (born 1923)

Personal information
- Born: 1923

Sport
- Sport: Fencing

Siha Sukarno (born 1923) is an Indonesian fencer. He competed in the individual sabre and épée events at the 1956 Summer Olympics.
