= Achad Arifin =

Indonesian footballer

Personal information
- Date of birth: 1936 (age 89–90)
- Position: Forward

Senior career*
Years	Team	Apps	(Gls)
- PSP Padang

International career
- Indonesia
- * Club domestic league appearances and goals

Achad Arifin (born 1936) is an Indonesian former footballer. He competed in the men's tournament at the 1956 Summer Olympics.
