= Ivan Boboshko =

Soviet footballer and coach

Ivan Boboshko (died 3 December 2012) was a Soviet football player and coach. A forward, he played for eight seasons in Shakhtar Donetsk.

In 1956 Boboshko played couple of games for Ukraine at the Spartakiad of the Peoples of the USSR and scoring one goal.

On 3 December 2012 Boboshko died at the age of 83.
