= Mikhail Ogonkov =

Russian footballer

Personal information
- Full name: Mikhail Pavlovich Ogonkov
- Date of birth: 24 June 1932
- Place of birth: Moscow, USSR
- Date of death: 14 August 1979 (aged 47)
- Place of death: Moscow, USSR
- Position: Defender

Youth career
- Krasny Proletariy Moscow

Senior career*
Years	Team	Apps	(Gls)
1953–1958	FC Spartak Moscow		
1961	FC Spartak Moscow		

International career
1955–1958	USSR	23	(0)
- * Club domestic league appearances and goals

Olympic medal record

Representing Soviet Union

Men's Football
Gold medal – first place	1956 Melbourne	Team competition

Mikhail Pavlovich Ogonkov (Russian: Михаил Павлович Огоньков; 24 June 1932 in Moscow – 14 August 1979, Moscow) was a Russian footballer of the 1950s and 1960s. He played as a left-back for Spartak Moscow. According to the footballer Nikita Simonyan Mikhail Ogonkov was the best Soviet Full Back of all times

Ogonkov was a member of the USSR team that won the 1956 Olympic gold medal. His main attributes were his positioning, exceptional fitness and strong tackling.

In 1958 he was arrested, along with Eduard Streltsov and Boris Tatushin, over an alleged rape. The resulting indefinite ban later reduced to three-year ban from football deprived him of playing at his peak. Soon after his return from suspension in 1961 he was badly injured (his kidney was removed) and forced to retire from playing football. He then worked as a children coach in Spartak Moscow.

In 1979 his dead body was found in his Moscow apartment apparently two weeks after the death. The cause of the death was not properly investigated although murder was rumored.
