= Charlie Twissell =

English footballer (1932–2023)

Personal information
- Full name: Charles Herbert Twissell
- Date of birth: 16 December 1932
- Place of birth: Singapore
- Date of death: 18 January 2023 (aged 90)
- Height: 5 ft 8 in (1.73 m)
- Position: Winger

Senior career*
Years	Team	Apps	(Gls)
1955–1958	Plymouth Argyle	41	(9)
1958–1961	York City	53	(8)
- Guiseley
Total		94	(17)

International career
1956	England Amateurs	5	(0)
1956	Great Britain	11	(2)
- * Club domestic league appearances and goals

Charles Herbert Twissell (16 December 1932 – 18 January 2023) was an English professional footballer who played as a winger.

== Personal life and club career ==
Charles Herbert Twissell was born in Singapore, where his father worked in the prison service. Twissell and his family moved to England when he was seven years old. He was a radar technician in the Royal Navy and played regularly for their representative football team.

Twissell was discovered by Plymouth Argyle, and signed for the Second Division club as an amateur in April 1955. He turned professional in April 1957, and made 41 league appearances for Plymouth, scoring nine goals. Twissell signed for York City in November 1958, making his debut on 22 November in a 3–2 home win over Walsall in the Fourth Division. He left York in 1961 to work in insurance, having scored eight goals in 56 appearances in all competitions for the club. He continued to play locally, including for non-league club Guiseley, and in 1969 was helping train Norton United. He retired in 1992, at which time he was living in Haxby, near York.

== International career ==
Twissell made his debut for the England national amateur team on 11 February 1956, in a 2–1 defeat to Wales at the Vetch Field in the 1955–56 British Amateur Championship. He then played in England's 4–2 win over Scotland at Wembley Stadium on 24 March 1956, as England jointly won the 1955–56 British Amateur Championship with Northern Ireland. Twissell made five appearances for the England amateur team in 1956.

Twissell made his first appearance for the Great Britain Olympic team on 12 May 1956 in a 3–3 draw with Bulgaria at Wembley Stadium in a qualifier for the 1956 Summer Olympics. Despite losing 5–3 on aggregate, Great Britain were entered into the tournament after Poland withdrew. Twissell was selected for the Great Britain squad for the 1956 Summer Olympics, and was their youngest player at the age of 23. He scored twice in Great Britain's 9–0 win over Thailand at Olympic Park Stadium in the first round on 26 November 1956, and played in their 6–1 defeat to Bulgaria in the quarter-final four days later. Twissell played 11 times for the Great Britain Olympic team in 1956, scoring two goals.

Charlie Twissell died on 18 January 2023, at the age of 90.

== Honours ==
England Amateurs

- British Amateur Championship: 1955–56 (joint)
