= Anatoli Bashashkin =

Russian footballer (1924–2002)

- Bashashkin heading away in a friendly between Moscow and Poland

Personal information
- Full name: Anatoli Vasilyevich Bashashkin
- Date of birth: 23 February 1924
- Place of birth: Reutov, Moscow Governorate, Soviet Union
- Date of death: 27 July 2002 (aged 78)
- Place of death: Moscow, Russia
- Position: Defender

Senior career*
Years	Team	Apps	(Gls)
1946	DO Tbilisi	14	(0)
1947–1952	CDKA Moscow	99	(1)
1953	FC Spartak Moscow	12	(0)
1954–1958	CDSA Moscow	73	(0)
Total		198	(1)

International career
1952–1956	USSR	21	(0)

Managerial career
- 1976: FC Pakhtakor Tashkent
- Krasnaya Presnya Moscow
- 1981: FC Spartak Moscow (assistant)
Medal record
Representing Soviet Union
Men's Football
Olympic Games
Gold medal – first place	1956 Melbourne	Team competition
- * Club domestic league appearances and goals

Anatoli Vasilyevich Bashashkin (Russian: Анатолий Васильевич Башашкин; 23 February 1924, Reutovo, Moscow Governorate, Russia – 27 July 2002, Moscow, Russia) was a Soviet and Russian footballer in the 1940s and 1950s and a football coach later. He played as a central defender.

He was captain of the Soviet Union at the 1952 Olympics, but following their politically embarrassing defeat to Yugoslavia he was stripped of the captaincy.

In 1947–1953 Bashashkin was a member of the CDKA team that won four domestic titles in the 1940s and earlier 1950s (1947, 1948, 1950, 1951), but following the 1952 Olympics the team was disbanded by Joseph Stalin. After that he moved to Spartak Moscow in 1953. After Stalin's death he returned to CDKA (renamed CDSA at that time) in 1954 and played there until 1958. Bashashkin was part of the USSR team which won the 1956 Olympic football title. He won USSR Gold medals five times (four times with CDKA in 1947, 1948, 1950, 1951 and once with Spartak in 1953) and Soviet Cup three times (1948, 1951, 1955).

He was noted for his ability on the ball, physical strength and his long-range passing, which started countless counterattacks.

After retirement from football Bashashkin graduated from the Malinovsky Military Armored Forces Academy and served in Ukraine as a tank military officer of the Soviet Army. Later he returned to football as a coach. Bashahkin was the main coach of Pakhtakor Tashkent FK in 1976 and he was an assistant coach (under Konstantin Beskov) of FC Spartak Moscow in 1981. According to journalist Pavel Alyoshin, Bashashkin was not very successful as a coach, spending much time telling the players of the 1970s and 80s how inferior they were compared to the footballers of the 1950s.
