= Frank Loughran =

Footballer (1931–2008)

Personal information
- Full name: Francis Loughran
- Date of birth: 31 January 1931
- Place of birth: Belfast, Northern Ireland
- Date of death: 11 January 2008 (aged 76)
- Place of death: Australia
- Position: Midfielder

Senior career*
Years	Team	Apps	(Gls)
- Brantwood
1954–1961	Moreland		

International career
1955–1958	Australia	8	(2)
- * Club domestic league appearances and goals

Frank Loughran (31 January 1931 – 11 January 2008) was a Belfast-born footballer who was considered to be one of the pioneers of the sport in Australia.

== Club career ==
Loughran grew up in the Ardoyne area of north Belfast and spent his early football career at amateur club Brantwood.

He moved to Australia at the age of 23 with his wife Lily and two small sons.

After settling in Melbourne, he joined his brother-in-law Andy at Moreland Soccer Club. He showed such skill and potential for the Victorian Division 1 team that he soon caught the eye of both Victoria and Australian selectors. He made his debut for Moreland on 3 April 1954 at Fawkner Park in South Yarra. He scored once in a 7–1 victory.

Loughran scored for Moreland in their 2–1 victory over Juventus in the 1957 final of the Dockerty Cup, played at Olympic Park in Melbourne. Also in 1957 he helped Moreland finish second in Victorian Division 1, which saw the club promoted to the Victorian State League.

In total, would enjoy eight years at Moreland before retiring at the end of the 1961 season.

== International career ==
Loughran represented the Australia national team at various levels between 1955 and 1960. He played a total of eight full international matches for Socceroos scoring two goals, one each against Japan and New Zealand.

In total he represented Australia 38 times, mostly in B internationals, scoring 22 goals. He added another 20 in 25 matches for Victoria.

Loughran first represented his adopted country in July 1955 when he turned out for an Australian XI in a B international against South China. He scored twice. His first senior cap came on 3 September 1955 at Brisbane Cricket Ground in a 3–0 defeat to South Africa.

Also in 1955, he would play his part in a further two matches with South Africa, which both ended in defeat, as well as appearing in two more B internationals.

Loughran represented Australia at the 1956 Melbourne Olympics, the first time Australia took part in the Olympic soccer tournament. He scored in the opening match at Olympic Park, a 2–0 win against Japan. They lost their second match to India 4–2.

In 1957, Australia only played B games hosting FK Austria, Ferencváros and Eastern Athletic from Hong Kong. The following year, the international B team played a series of matches against Blackpool, who featured Stanley Matthews.

Loughran scored in the first of these games. Later in 1958, Loughran was part of the Australia squad that embarked on a ten match tour of New Zealand. The Australians played two tests against New Zealand and the remainder of games against local representative and club sides. Loughran scored in the first senior game.

His final game in an Australia shirt came on 16 May 1959 in a 7–1 defeat in Brisbane to the touring Hearts side.

== Later life and death ==
His success helped him become an inaugural inductee to the Australian Football (Soccer) Hall of Fame in February 1999.

He was invested with the Medal of Excellence at the ceremony. This is awarded for distinguished service or contributions to football in Australia, whether at state/territory level, nationally or internationally.

He was invited to take part in the Torch Relay for the 2000 Sydney Olympics.

Loughran died, aged 77, after a short illness.
