= Boris Razinsky =

Soviet footballer

Personal information
- Full name: Boris Davidovich Razinsky
- Date of birth: 12 July 1933
- Place of birth: Lyubertsy, Russian SFSR, USSR
- Date of death: 6 August 2012 (aged 79)
- Place of death: Moscow, Russia
- Positions: Goalkeeper; forward

Youth career
- Pishchevik Tula

Senior career*
Years	Team	Apps	(Gls)
1947–1951	V/Ch Bologoye		
1951	GTsOLIFK Moscow		
1952	CSKA Moscow	0	
1952	Kalinin City Team	2	(0)
1953	MVO Moscow	0	(0)
1953	FC Spartak Moscow	1	(0)
1954–1961	CSKA Moscow	160	(2)
1961	FC Spartak Moscow	4	(0)
1962	FC Dynamo Kyiv	18	(0)
1963	FC Chornomorets Odesa	28	(3)
1964	Serp i Molot Moscow	2	(0)
1966	SKA Odesa	7	(0)
1967–1968	FC Metallurg Lipetsk	?	(23)
1969	Politotdel Tashkent Oblast	39	(1)
1970	FK Daugava Rīga	8	(0)
1970	FC Ararat Yerevan	11	(0)
1971	Volga Gorky		
1972–1973	Granit Tetyukhe		

International career
1955–1956	USSR	3	(0)
1959	USSR (Olymp.)	4	(0)

Managerial career
- 1974: Dvina Vitebsk (director)
- 1974: CSKA Moscow (assistant)
- 1975–1976: FK Daugava Rīga (scout)
- 1999: Suwon Bluewings (assistant)
- 1999–2000: FC Chernomorets Novorossiysk (assistant)
- 2001: FC Khimki (assistant)
- 2001: FC Chernomorets Novorossiysk (assistant)
- 2001–2002: FC Volgar-Gazprom Astrakhan (assistant)
- * Club domestic league appearances and goals

Olympic medal record

Representing Soviet Union

Men's Football
Gold medal – first place	1956 Melbourne	Team competition

Boris Davidovich Razinsky (Russian: Борис Давидович Разинский; 12 July 1933 – 6 August 2012) was a Soviet Russian Olympic champion football player and manager.

== Personal life ==
Razinsky was born in Lyubertsy, Russia, and died in Moscow. He was Jewish. In 2009, Razinsky attended the 2009 Maccabiah Games to watch his grandson participate in the under-18 football competition. Razinsky's visit was marred by a brawl between the Russian and Argentine sides and both squads were told not to return for the 2013 Maccabiah Games.

== Football career ==
Razinsky played both as a goalkeeper and as a striker (usually keeping one specific position while playing at the same club). He played in goal for the national team as a backup to Lev Yashin. His club from 1954 to 1961 was CSKA Moskva, with whom he earned three bronzes at the Soviet championships in 1955, 1956, and 1958, and the Soviet Cup in 1955.

=== International career ===
Razinsky made his debut for USSR on October 23, 1955, in a friendly against France.

He and the national team won the gold medal at the 1956 Olympics.

He was the main and only goalkeeper during 1960 Olympic qualification tournament, the Soviet team failed to qualify allowing Bulgaria to qualify instead in the three-team qualification tournament.

=== Honours ===
- Olympic champion: 1956.
- Soviet Top League winner: 1953.
- Soviet Cup winner: 1955.

== See also ==
- List of select Jewish football (association; soccer) players
