= Aleksei Paramonov =

Soviet footballer (1925–2018)

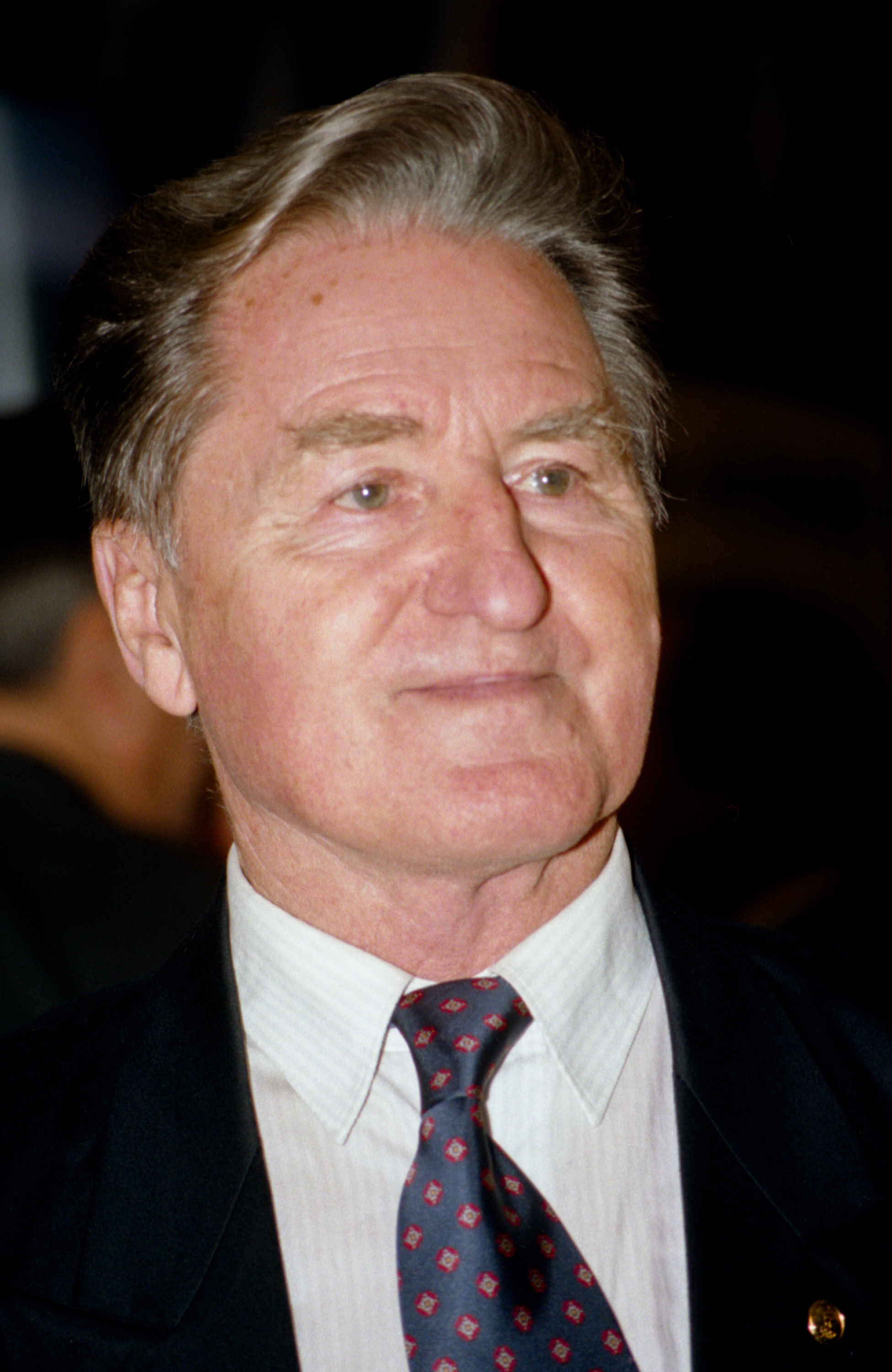

Personal information
- Full name: Aleksei Aleksandrovich Paramonov
- Date of birth: 21 February 1925
- Place of birth: Borovsk, Russian SFSR, Soviet Union
- Date of death: 24 August 2018 (aged 93)
- Place of death: Moscow, Russia
- Positions: Striker; midfielder

Senior career*
Years	Team	Apps	(Gls)
1944–1945	Stroitel Moscow		
1946–1947	VVS Moscow	9	(2)
1947–1959	Spartak Moscow	264	(63)

International career
1954–1957	USSR	13	(0)

Managerial career
- 1960–1965: Soviet Union U-19
- 1965–1967: Étoile Sahel
- 1967–1969: Soviet Union U-21
- 1969–1971: Soviet Union (assistant)
- 1973–1974: Soviet Union (assistant)
- 1976–1977: Étoile Sahel
- 1979–1984: Soviet Union U-21
- * Club domestic league appearances and goals

Olympic medal record

Representing Soviet Union

Men's Football
Gold medal – first place	1956 Melbourne	Team competition

Aleksei Aleksandrovich Paramonov (Russian: Алексей Александрович Парамонов; 21 February 1925 – 24 August 2018) was a Soviet football player and manager, 1956 Olympic champion. He was born in Borovsk.

== Biography ==
Paramonov and his wife Yulia Vasilievna were married from 1950 until his death and had a daughter. In 2016 Yulia Paramonova died. Aleksei died at a hospital in Moscow from a brief illness on 24 August 2018, aged 93.

== Awards ==
=== Government ===
- Order For Merit to the Fatherland 4th class (1999)
- Order of Honour (2005)
- Order of Friendship (1997)
- Order of the Badge of Honour (1957)
- Honored Master of Sports of the USSR (1953)
- Veteran of Labour (1985)
- Honorary Citizen of Borovsk (2008)

=== Sports ===
- Olympic Order (2001)
- Ruby Order of UEFA (2001)
- Order of FIFA For Merit (2006)
