= Don Stoker =

English footballer and manager

Personal information
- Full name: Donald Stoker
- Date of birth: 30 December 1922
- Place of birth: Durham, England
- Date of death: 1 December 1985 (aged 62)
- Place of death: Surrey, England
- Position: Defender

Senior career*
Years	Team	Apps	(Gls)
1946–1950	Kingstonian	?	(?)
1950–1959	Sutton United	302	(34)

International career
1956	Great Britain	2	(0)

Managerial career
- 1959: Sutton United
- 1959–1967: Walton & Hersham
- * Club domestic league appearances and goals

Donald Stoker (30 December 1922 – 1 December 1985) was an English footballer who represented Great Britain at the 1956 Summer Olympics. Stoker played as an amateur for Kingstonian and Sutton United, and went on to manage Sutton for a brief period. He then moved on to Walton & Hersham and managed them for 8 years, winning the Surrey Senior Cup twice.
