= Ernst-Günter Habig =

German footballer and manager

Personal information
- Full name: Ernst-Günter Habig
- Date of birth: 14 September 1935
- Place of birth: Cologne, Germany
- Date of death: 14 March 2012 (aged 76)
- Place of death: Cologne, Germany
- Position: Midfielder

Youth career
- Union Köln

Senior career*
Years	Team	Apps	(Gls)
1957–1960	Viktoria 04 Köln		
1960–1963	1. FC Köln		
1963–1965	Viktoria 04 Köln		
1965–1967	Fortuna Köln		

International career
1956	West Germany Olympic	1	(0)

Managerial career
- 1970–1972: Fortuna Köln
- 1973–1975: Viktoria 04 Köln
- 1976–1977: Fortuna Köln
- 1979–1981: Viktoria 04 Köln
- 1981: Alemannia Aachen
- * Club domestic league appearances and goals

Ernst-Günter Habig (14 September 1935 – 14 March 2012) was a German professional footballer.

== Career ==
Habig played club football for Union Köln, 1. FC Köln and Viktoria 04 Köln. Habig also participated at the 1956 Summer Olympics.

== Later life and death ==
He died in Cologne on 14 March 2012.
