= Nikolai Tishchenko =

Soviet footballer

Personal information
- Full name: Nikolai Ivanovich Tishchenko
- Date of birth: 10 December 1926
- Place of birth: Lyublino, Russian SFSR, USSR
- Date of death: 10 May 1981 (aged 54)
- Place of death: Moscow, Russian SFSR, USSR
- Position: Defender

Senior career*
Years	Team	Apps	(Gls)
1951–1958	FC Spartak Moscow	105	(0)

International career
1954, 1956	USSR	12	(0)

Managerial career
- 1965: FC Spartak Moscow (assistant)
- * Club domestic league appearances and goals

Olympic medal record

Representing Soviet Union

Men's Football
Gold medal – first place	1956 Melbourne	Team competition

Nikolai Ivanovich Tishchenko (Russian: Николай Иванович Тищенко) (born 10 December 1926 in Lyublino; died 10 May 1981 in Moscow) was a Soviet football player.

== Honours ==
- Olympic champion: 1956.
- Soviet Top League winner: 1952, 1953, 1956, 1958.
- Soviet Top League runner-up: 1954, 1955.
- Soviet Top League bronze: 1957.
- Season-end Top 33 players list: 1957.

== International career ==
Tishchenko made his debut for USSR on 8 September 1954 in a friendly against Sweden. He came into limelight during the 1956 Olympics semifinal against Bulgaria he broke his clavicle, the substitutions were not yet allowed, so he stayed on the field, finishing the game.
