= Laurie Topp =

English footballer (1923–2017)

Personal information
- Full name: Lawrence Robert Topp
- Date of birth: 11 November 1923
- Place of birth: St Pancras, London, England
- Date of death: 8 January 2017 (aged 93)

Senior career*
Years	Team	Apps	(Gls)
1944–1961	Hendon		

International career
1952–1956	Great Britain	3	(1)
	England amateur	32	
- * Club domestic league appearances and goals

Lawrence Robert Topp (11 November 1923 – 8 January 2017) was an English footballer who represented Great Britain at the 1952 Summer Olympics and 1956 Summer Olympics. Topp played as an amateur for Hendon, and represented the England amateur national team. He made his debut for Hendon (then known as Golders Green) in 1944 and remained a regular in the side until his retirement at the end of the 1960–61 season. He won three Athenian league titles with the club (1953, 1956 and 1961) and scored in the final of the 1960 FA Amateur Cup when Hendon beat Kingstonian 2–1 at Wembley. Topp died on 8 January 2017, at the age of 93.
