= Jack Laybourne =

English footballer (1927–1980)

Personal information
- Full name: John Sylvester Laybourne
- Date of birth: 26 May 1927
- Place of birth: Durham, England
- Date of death: 1 July 1980 (aged 53)
- Position: Forward

Senior career*
Years	Team	Apps	(Gls)
- Corinthian-Casuals

International career
1956	Great Britain	2	(3)
- * Club domestic league appearances and goals

John Sylvester Laybourne (26 May 1927 – 1 July 1980) was an English footballer who represented Great Britain at the 1956 Summer Olympics. A forward, he played as an amateur for Corinthian-Casuals.
