= George Bromilow =

English footballer

Personal information
- Full name: George Joseph Bromilow
- Date of birth: 4 December 1931
- Place of birth: Southport, England
- Date of death: 19 December 2005 (aged 74)
- Place of death: Southport, England
- Position: Inside forward

Senior career*
Years	Team	Apps	(Gls)
- Northern Nomads
1955–1959	Southport	84	(37)
- Bishop Auckland

International career
1956	Great Britain	2	(2)
- * Club domestic league appearances and goals

George Joseph Bromilow (4 December 1931 – 19 December 2005) was an English amateur footballer who represented Great Britain at the 1956 Summer Olympics. During the tournament, Bromilow scored two goals in two games.

Bromilow, who played as an inside forward, made 84 appearances in the Football League for Southport between 1955 and 1959, scoring 37 goals. Bromilow also played non-league football with Northern Nomads and Bishop Auckland.
