= Association football at the 1956 Summer Olympics =

Tournament details
- Host country: Australia
- City: Melbourne
- Dates: 24 November – 8 December 1956
- Teams: 11
- Venues: 2 (in 1 host city)

Final positions
- Champions: Soviet Union (1st title)
- Runners-up: Yugoslavia
- Third place: Bulgaria
- Fourth place: India

Tournament statistics
- Matches played: 12
- Goals scored: 53 (4.42 per match)
- Attendance: 194,333 (16,194 per match)
- Top scorer(s): (India) Neville D'Souza (Socialist Federal Republic of Yugoslavia) Todor Veselinović (Bulgaria) Dimitar Milanov (4 goals each)

The association football tournament at the 1956 Summer Olympics was won by the Soviet Union.

Defending champions Hungary were forced to withdraw due to the Soviet invasion of their country. Besides Hungary, the tournament was ignored by Spain, the Netherlands, Switzerland, and Liechtenstein. In addition to the situation with Hungary, several more countries boycotted the competitions due to the Suez Crisis, while China ignored the tournament due to the IOC recognition of Taiwan.

This was the first Olympic football tournament where all the medalists were communist countries, with Yugoslavia and Bulgaria taking silver and bronze respectively.

== Background ==
Following five withdrawals, the tournament featured three Eastern Bloc teams and four from Asia. The other sides included in the draw were the United States, the United Team of Germany (which was de facto West Germany), Great Britain and the hosts Australia, competing in their first Olympic football tournament.

The tendency of Eastern bloc countries to provide state-funding for their athletes put Western amateurs at a significant disadvantage. As a result, all Olympic football tournaments 1952 onwards were dominated by the Soviet Union and its satellites.

== Venues ==
Melbourne
Olympic Park Stadium	Melbourne Cricket Ground
Capacity: 40,000	Capacity: 104,000
Association football at the 1956 Summer Olympics is located in Melbourne

== Teams ==
=== Qualification ===
- Australia (20)
- Bulgaria (15)
- United Team of Germany (15)
- Great Britain (16)
- India (18)
- Indonesia (20)
- Japan (18)
- Soviet Union (20)
- Thailand (13)
- United States (16)
- Yugoslavia (17)

== First round ==
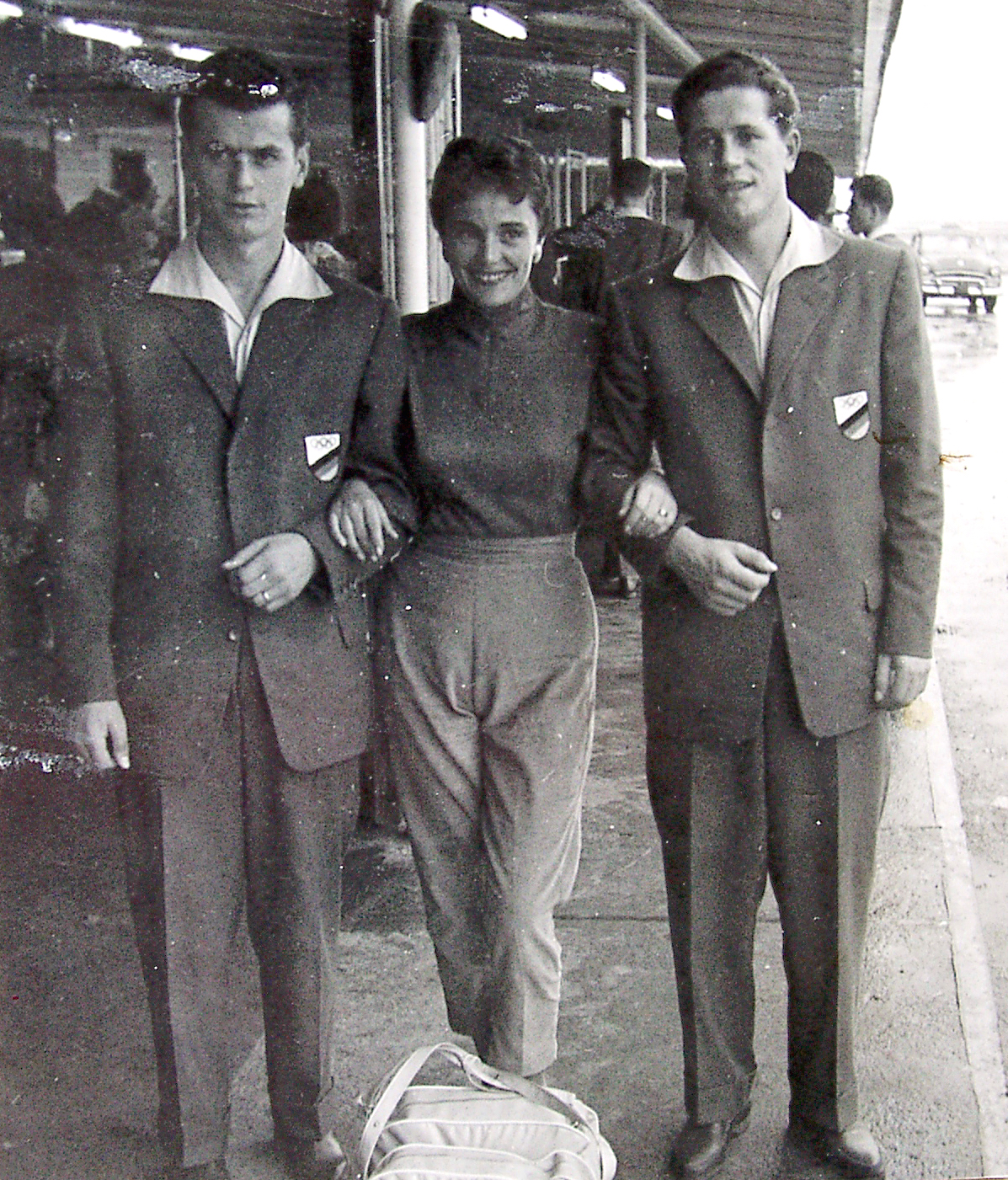
German players Rudi Hoffmann (left) and Max Schwall (right)

Hungary announced their withdrawal on 31 August, a day before the draw. The draw was made with fifteen teams, India receiving a bye. Four more teams withdrew after the final draw: China (boycotted the Games to protest the reception of Taiwan), Egypt (withdrew due to Suez Crisis), Turkey and Vietnam.

Therefore, only three games were played in the first round: as China and Turkey had been drawn against each other, their match was scratched.

The Soviet Union defeated the United Team of Germany 2–1, Great Britain defeated Thailand 9–0, and Australia defeated Japan 2–0.

24 November 1956
14:30 AEST (UTC+10)

Soviet Union	2–1	United Team of Germany
Isayev 23'; Streltsov 86'	Report	Habig 89'

Olympic Park Stadium, Melbourne
Attendance: 12,000
Referee: Robert Mann (Great Britain)

26 November 1956
16:30 AEST (UTC+10)

Great Britain	9–0	Thailand
Twissell 12', 20'; Lewis 21' (pen.); Laybourne 30', 82', 85'; Bromilow 75', 78'; Topp 90'	Report

Olympic Park Stadium, Melbourne
Attendance: 3,693
Referee: Nikolay Latyshev (Soviet Union)

27 November 1956
16:30 AEST (UTC+10)

Australia	2–0	Japan
McMillan 26' (pen.); Loughran 61'	Report

Olympic Park Stadium, Melbourne
Attendance: 3,568
Referee: Reginald Lund (New Zealand)

Byes: Bulgaria (drawn against Egypt, who withdrew), India, Indonesia (drawn against Vietnam, who withdrew), USA and Yugoslavia (drawn against each other: match was postponed to the quarter-finals).

== Quarter-finals ==
Yugoslavia defeated the United States 9–1.

Bulgaria led Great Britain 3–1 at half-time, when ratings from HMS Newcastle vaulted the fence and exhorted the team to show more grit, after which they were peacefully escorted off the field. The British team went on to lose 6–1.

The Soviet Union drew their game against Indonesia 0–0 and won 4–0 in the replay.

The Indians defeated Australia 4–2 with a hat trick by centre forward Neville D'Souza, the first by an Asian in the Olympics. Prior to the game there had been debate, once again, as to whether the Indians should be shod. Sir Stanley Rous respected their decision either way, although in the end, the Indians decided to wear boots.

28 November 1956
16:30 AEST (UTC+10)

Yugoslavia	9–1	United States
Veselinović 10', 84', 90'; Antić 12', 73'; Mujić 16', 35', 56'; Papec 20'	Report	Zerhusen 42'

Olympic Park Stadium, Melbourne
Attendance: 5,292
Referee: Maurice Swain (New Zealand)

29 November 1956
16:30 AEST (UTC+10)

Soviet Union	0–0 (a.e.t.)	Indonesia
	Report

Olympic Park Stadium, Melbourne
Attendance: 3,228
Referee: Shigemaru Takenokoshi (Japan)
1 December 1956
10:30 AEST (UTC+10)

Soviet Union	4–0	Indonesia
Salnikov 17', 59'; Ivanov 19'; Netto 43'	Report

Olympic Park Stadium, Melbourne
Attendance: 6,735
Referee: Reginald Lund (New Zealand)

30 November 1956
16:30 AEST (UTC+10)

Bulgaria	6–1	Great Britain
Dimitrov 6'; Kolev 40', 85'; Milanov 45', 75', 80'	Report	Lewis 30'

Olympic Park Stadium, Melbourne
Attendance: 6,748
Referee: Ron Wright (Australia)

1 December 1956
14:30 AEST (UTC+10)

Australia	2–4	India
Morrow 17', 41'	Report	D'Souza 9', 33', 50'; Kittu 80'

Olympic Park Stadium, Melbourne
Attendance: 7,413
Referee: C.H. Wensveen (Indonesia)

== Semi-finals ==
Yugoslavia defeated India 4–1. It would be their third consecutive Olympic final, after losing both in 1948 and 1952.

The Soviets defeated Bulgaria 2–1. Normal time finished 0–0, and Bulgaria scored first in extra time before conceding two goals in the last six minutes of the game.

4 December 1956
16:30 AEST (UTC+10)

Yugoslavia	4–1	India
Papec 54', 65'; Veselinović 57'; Salam 78' (o.g.)	Report	D'Souza 52'

Olympic Park Stadium, Melbourne
Attendance: 16,626
Referee: Nikolay Latyshev (Soviet Union)

5 December 1956
16:30 AEST (UTC+10)

Soviet Union	2–1 (a.e.t.)	Bulgaria
Streltsov 112'; Tatushin 116'	Report	Kolev 95'

Olympic Park Stadium, Melbourne
Attendance: 21,079
Referee: Robert Mann (Great Britain)

== Bronze medal match ==
Bulgaria took Bronze defeating India 3–0.

7 December 1956
14:15 AEST (UTC+10)

Bulgaria	3–0	India
Diev 37', 60'; Milanov 42'	Report

Melbourne Cricket Ground, Melbourne
Attendance: 21,236
Referee: Nikolay Latyshev (Soviet Union)

== Gold medal match ==
8 December 1956
14:15 AEST (UTC+10)

Soviet Union	1–0	Yugoslavia
Ilyin 48'	Report

Melbourne Cricket Ground, Melbourne
Attendance: 86,716
Referee: Ron Wright (Australia)

Team details

Soviet Union
Yugoslavia

GK	Lev Yashin
RB	Mikhail Ogonkov
CB	Anatoli Bashashkin
LB	Boris Kuznetsov
RH	Anatoli Maslenkin
LH	Igor Netto
OR	Boris Tatushin
IR	Anatoli Isayev
CF	Nikita Simonyan
IL	Sergei Salnikov
OL	Anatoli Ilyin
Manager:
Gavriil Kachalin

GK	Petar Radenković
RB	Mladen Koščak
LB	Nikola Radović
RH	Ivan Santek
CH	Ljubiša Spajić
LH	Dobroslav Krstić
OR	Dragoslav Šekularac
IR	Zlatko Papec
CF	Sava Antić
IL	Todor Veselinović
OL	Muhamed Mujić
Manager:
Aleksandar Tirnanić

== Bracket ==
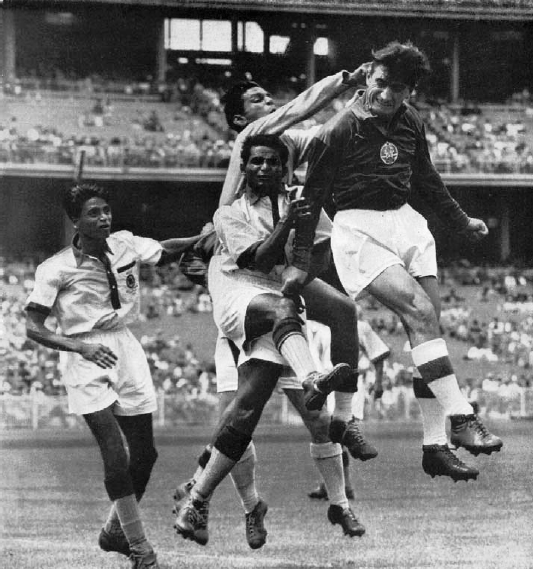
Indian team at a tussle against Bulgaria in the bronze-medal match.

First round
Yugoslavia
bye
United States
bye
November
Australia	2
Japan	0
India
bye
Indonesia
bye
November
Soviet Union	2
United Team of Germany	1
Bulgaria
bye
November
Great Britain	9
Thailand	0

Quarter-finals
November – Olympic Park
Yugoslavia	9
United States	1
December – MCG
Australia	2
India	4
December – Olympic Park
Indonesia	0
Soviet Union	4(tb)
December – MCG
Bulgaria	6
Great Britain	1

Semi-finals
December – MCG
Yugoslavia	4
India	1
December – Olympic Park
Soviet Union (a.e.t.)	2
Bulgaria	1

Final
December – MCG
Yugoslavia	0
Soviet Union	1
December – MCG
India	0
Bulgaria	3

== Goalscorers ==
There were 53 goals scored in 12 matches, for an average of 4.42 goals per match.

4 goals

- (India) Neville D'Souza
- (Socialist Federal Republic of Yugoslavia) Todor Veselinović
- (Bulgaria) Dimitar Milanov

3 goals

- (Bulgaria) Ivan Petkov Kolev
- (United Kingdom) Jack Laybourne
- (Socialist Federal Republic of Yugoslavia) Muhamed Mujić
- (Socialist Federal Republic of Yugoslavia) Zlatko Papec

2 goals

- (Australia) Bruce Morrow
- (Bulgaria) Todor Diev
- (United Kingdom) George Bromilow
- (United Kingdom) Jim Lewis
- (United Kingdom) Charlie Twissell
- (Soviet Union) Sergei Salnikov
- (Soviet Union) Eduard Streltsov
- (Socialist Federal Republic of Yugoslavia) Sava Antić

1 goal

- (Australia) Frank Loughran
- (Australia) Graham McMillan
- (Bulgaria) Georgi Dimitrov
- (Germany) Ernst-Günter Habig
- (United Kingdom) Laurie Topp
- (India) J. "Kittu" Krishnaswamy
- (Soviet Union) Anatoli Ilyin
- (Soviet Union) Anatoli Isayev
- (Soviet Union) Valentin Ivanov
- (Soviet Union) Igor Netto
- (Soviet Union) Boris Tatushin
- (United States) Al Zerhusen

1 own goal

- (India) Muhamed Abdus Salam

== Medalists ==
Gold	Silver	Bronze
Soviet Union	Yugoslavia	Bulgaria
Lev Yashin; Nikolai Tishchenko; Mikhail Ogonkov; Aleksei Paramonov; Anatoli Bashashkin; Igor Netto; Boris Tatushin; Anatoli Isayev; Eduard Streltsov; Valentin Ivanov; Vladimir Ryzhkin; Boris Kuznetsov; Iosif Betsa; Sergei Salnikov; Boris Razinsky; Anatoli Maslenkin; Anatoli Ilyin; Nikita Simonyan; Yury Belyayev; Anatoli Porkhunov	Sava Antić; Ibrahim Biogradlić; Mladen Koščak; Dobroslav Krstić; Luka Liposinović; Muhamed Mujić; Zlatko Papec; Petar Radenković; Nikola Radović; Ivan Santek; Dragoslav Šekularac; Ljubiša Spajić; Todor Veselinović; Blagoja Vidinić	Stefan Bozhkov; Todor Diev; Georgi Dimitrov; Milcho Goranov; Ivan Petkov Kolev; Nikola Kovachev; Manol Manolov; Dimitar Milanov; Georgi Naydenov; Panayot Panayotov; Kiril Rakarov; Gavril Stoyanov; Krum Yanev; Yordan Yosifov; Pavel Vladimirov; Iliya Kirchev
