= Key Largo (disambiguation) =

Key Largo is an island in the Florida Keys in the United States.

Key Largo may also refer to:

- Key Largo, Florida, the unincorporated town on the island
- Key Largo (bar), a bar and national historic site in San José, Costa Rica
- Key Largo (board game), a 2005 board game set in Key Largo, Florida
- Key Largo (hotel and casino), a demolished hotel and casino in Las Vegas, Nevada
- Key Largo (play), a 1939 Broadway play by Maxwell Anderson set in Key Largo, Florida
- Key Largo (film), a 1948 film adaptation starring Humphrey Bogart and Lauren Bacall
- "Key Largo" (song), a 1981 song by Bertie Higgins referencing the 1948 film
- "Key Largo" (1948 song), a 1948 song first recorded by Benny Carter
- "Schnapps Key Largo Tropical", a brand of tropical schnapps made by DeKuyper

== See also ==
- Cayo Largo del Sur or "Cay Largo", a small resort island in Cuba
