= Paul Randles =

American game designer (1965–2003)

- Born: Paul Joseph Randles; December 16, 1965
- Died: February 10, 2003 (aged 37)
- Occupation: Game designer
- Writing career
- Genre: Board games

Paul Joseph Randles (December 16, 1965 – February 10, 2003) was an American game designer who designed German-style board games.

== Early life ==
Paul Randles was a native of Seattle, Washington.

== Career ==
Randles began his career in game development at Wizards of the Coast, where he worked on board games and card games including RoboRally, The Great Dalmuti and Xena & Hercules. He worked as a brand manager at Wizards. Randles left Wizards of the Coast and started his own game design company, Randles Games. He designed his first game Pirate's Cove with Daniel Stahl under his own firm. Randles and Stahl showed Pirate's Cove first to Amigo, and Amigo purchased the game in 2000 which helped Randles become a respected game designer in the European market in less than two years. His games Pirate's Cove and Key Largo (with Bruno Faidutti and Mike Selinker) were published first in Europe and then in the United States.

== Health ==
About a year after leaving Wizards of the Coast, Randles was diagnosed with pancreatic cancer. He died on February 10, 2003.
