= RoboRally: Armed and Dangerous =

RoboRally: Armed and Dangerous is a 1995 board game supplement published by Wizards of the Coast for RoboRally.

== Contents ==
RoboRally: Armed and Dangerous is a supplement in which the rules build on the original game's premise of robots racing and battling across a chaotic factory floor in a distant galaxy.

== Publication history ==
Armed and Dangerous is an expansion for RoboRally designed by Richard Garfield and published by Wizards of the Coast.

== Reception ==
Andy Butcher reviewed the Armed & Dangerous expansion set of RoboRally for Arcane magazine, rating it a 6 out of 10 overall. Butcher comments that "This is not for those people who enjoy the odd race every now and then, but for dedicated players only."

Pyramid magazine reviewed Armed and Dangerous and noted that this supplement improves the game because "RoboRally is a good game with some minor, fixable flaws."

RoboRally: Armed and Dangerous won the Origins Awards for Best Graphic Presentation of a Board Game of 1995.
