= Daniel Stahl (game designer) =

American game designer (born 1971)

- Born: USA
- Occupations: Senior Producer for Cryptic Studios and published by Perfect World

Daniel Stahl (born 1971) is an American game designer best known for creating German-style board games. In 2002, his game Pirate's Cove (with Paul Randles) was published by Amigo Spiele in Europe (under the name Piratenbucht) and in the United States by Days of Wonder.

A former member of the ImagiNation Network, he became a webmaster in 1994 and later created Alphastrike.com, a BattleTech trading card game fansite. He was also an online producer at Wizards of the Coast during the Hasbro acquisition where he managed development for the Star Wars: TCG, and MagicTheGathering.com websites.

He was a member of the Xbox 360 and Zune launch teams while working at Microsoft and later went on to work for Cryptic Studios where he was a game producer on Champions Online and Star Trek Online.

On July 1, 2010, the current Executive Producer, Craig Zinkiviech, for Star Trek Online announced that he would be leaving Cryptic/STO. At this point, Daniel Stahl became the executive producer for STO.

In September 2011, it was announced on the Star Trek Online website that he would be leaving Cryptic Studios and in an interview with Trek Radio, he revealed he is taking a position at Zynga.

In December 2011, Stahl posts on the Star Trek Online forums that he has returned to Cryptic and will now be the Sr. Producer managing the Foundry (UGC) tools at Cryptic Studios. This announcement was discussed in detail as it was revealed on Subspace Radio.

In January 2014, Cryptic Studios announced that Stahl would once again be stepping down as Sr. Producer for Star Trek Online, to pursue a yet unannounced project that Cryptic is working on. Stephen D'Angelo is now the current Sr. Producer for Star Trek Online .
