= Tilsit Éditions =

Tilsit Éditions was a French game publisher started in 1996 by Didier Jacobée. It made board games, strategy games, games for kids, and other such games until 2010.

Tilsit also distributed a number of French versions of Kosmos games, but the collaboration ended in 2006. Since 2003, Tilsit has published three main lines: Tilsit Collection for large-box games, Tilsit Poche for small-box multiplayer games and Tilsit Famille for intermediate games.

== Some games published in French by Tilsit ==
- Stratego, 1947, Jacques Johan Mogendorff
- Les Colons de Catane, 1995, Klaus Teuber, Spiel des Jahres 1995, Deutscher Spiele Preis 1995
- Kahuna, 1998, Günter Cornett, Super As d'Or 2000
- Puerto Rico, 2002, Andreas Seyfarth, Deutscher Spiele Preis 2002
- Les Évadés de Cartagena, 2005, Leo Colovini (in 2000 with Winning Moves)

=== Tilsit Collection ===
1. Maka Bana, 2003, François Haffner, Prix du Public du Jeu de Saint-Herblain 2004, Trophée Flip 2004
2. Kanaloa, 2003, Günter Cornett
3. Skåål, 2004, Thierry Lebourg alias Dr. Mops
4. Himalaya, 2004, Régis Bonnessée
5. Key Largo, 2005, Paul Randles, Mike Selinker and Bruno Faidutti

=== Tilsit Poche ===
1. Wanted!, 2003, Emiliano Sciarra
2. Korsar, 2005, Reiner Knizia
3. Fantasy Pub, 2005, Emanuele Ornella
4. Caramba!, 2005, Michael Schacht
5. Red Hot Silly Dragon, 2005, Guillaume Blossier et Frédéric Henry
