= Ogallala =

Ogallala may refer to:

- Ogallala, Nebraska
- Ogallala Aquifer
- Ogallala Commons
- Ogallala Formation
- Oglala Lakota (Sioux)
- Ogallala (game)
