= Ogallala (game) =

Card game

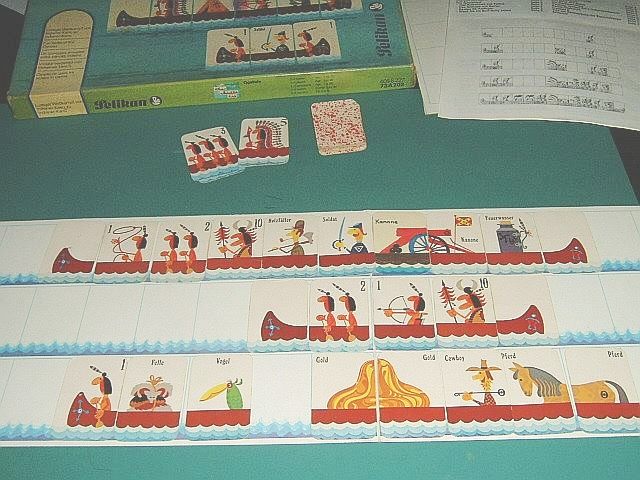
- Other names: Up the Creek; Blackfeet
- Designers: Rudi Hoffmann
- Illustrators: Oliver Freudenreich; Guido Hoffmann; Rudi Hoffmann
- Publishers: Pelikan (1975); Waddingtons (1977, 1980); ASS Altenburger (1988); Edition Perlhuhn (1988); Amigo Spiele (2002)
- Publication: 1975; 51 years ago
- Genres: Card game
- Players: 2–4
- Playing time: 45 minutes
- Age range: 5+

Ogallala, also known as Blackfeet or Up the Creek, is a card game designed by Rudi Hoffmann and first published in 1975 by Pelikan. It has since seen multiple editions, including releases by ASS Altenburger in 1988 and Amigo Spiele in 2002. The game accommodates 2–4 players, is suitable for ages 6 and up, and typically lasts between 20 and 40 minutes.

== Publishing history ==
Over the years, Ogallala has been released in various editions with slight differences in rules and card counts. The game was first published in Germany by Pelikan in 1975 as Ogallala. The game rights were acquired by Waddingtons who published the game in English under the names Up the Creek in 1977, and Blackfeet – The Great Indian Canoe Game in 1980. In 1988, the game was re-published in Germany by Reinhold Wittig's publishing company, Edition Perlhun, as Muros, and by ASS Altenburger as Ogallala. Amigo Spiele also re-published Ogallala in 2002. The Pelikan edition contained 98 cards, the ASS Altenburger edition had 134 cards, and the Amigo Spiele edition featured 112 cards. A computerized version was released for PC in 2004 by Koch Media.

== Gameplay ==
In Ogallala, players aim to be the first to construct three complete canoes while hindering their opponents from achieving the same goal. Each canoe consists of a bow, a stern, and optional middle sections. Players draw and play cards representing boat parts, Native Americans, and treasures. Special cards, such as archers and lasso throwers, allow players to attack opponents' crew members or capture treasures. Completing a canoe with a higher attack value enables a player to sink an opponent's canoe, seizing their treasures, unless the opponent's canoe contains a totem, which offers protection.

The game relies on a combination of luck and strategic planning. Players must decide when to expand their canoes, when to attack opponents, and how to best utilize their cards to achieve victory. The dynamic of targeting the leading player often allows others to catch up, maintaining a balanced competition.

== Reception ==
The Amigo Spiele edition received second to last place at Fairplay's 2002 Á la Carte game awards. The computerized version of Ogallala earned second place in the "Casual Game" category at the 2004 Deutscher Entwicklerpreis.

German games magazine Die Pöppel-Revue noted that Chaos Marauders, a 1987 card game in which players in which players build warbands of fantasy creatures to loot the armies of other players, bears a close resemblance to the gameplay of Ogallala. In 1980, Waddingtons published Starships by Rudi Hoffman, which was a reimplementation of Ogallala's mechanics with shorter, clearer gameplay, and space fantasy theming.
