= Pecking order (disambiguation) =

Pecking order is a hierarchical system.

Pecking order may also refer to:

- Pecking Order (film), a 2017 New Zealand film
- Pecking Order (game), a card game
- Pecking order theory, a financial model
