= Spectromancer =

2008 video game

Spectromancer: Gathering of Power
- The main duel screen
- Developers: Three Donkeys LLC; Apus Software; Jagdish Chanda (Flash)
- Designers: Alexey Stankevich; Richard Garfield; Skaff Elias
- Platforms: Microsoft Windows iOS
- Release: October 2008
- Genre: Turn-based strategy
- Modes: Single-player, multiplayer

Spectromancer (Russian: Спектромансер) is a computer game developed by Apus Software and Three Donkeys LLC. The game was released in October 2008. The expansions League of Heroes, Truth & Beauty, and Gathering of Power are upgrades to the game rather than stand-alone expansions and, were released in 2010, 2011, and 2013, respectively.

The game was developed by Magic: The Gathering creator Richard Garfield, Alexey Stankevich (creator of Astral Tournament and Astral Masters) and Skaff Elias. Spectromancer's gameplay revolves around a playing-card dynamic. In the single-player campaign, the player traverses a mythical world collecting various cards to use in duels. There is also an online arena, where a player can duel other players, and a high score list. Monthly online tournaments were hosted from February 2013 through June 2016, in which the best players of the game competed.

Unlike most collectible card games, players do not construct a deck before the game starts. Instead, at the beginning of each duel, each player is randomly given twenty cards, four from each of five elements. (The four classical elements, plus a fifth element of the player's choice.) These cards vary in mana cost and function. Each turn, the player gains one mana in each element, and may play a single card. Playing a card does not cause it to become "used"; there is no concept of a hand or a discard pile. The game ends once one player succeeds in bringing the other player's life total down to 0.

The free trial offers the full single player mode, and a limited online player versus player mode. The full, purchased version offers twelve classes as of 1.2, with their corresponding specialties.

In 2020, the developer released the game engine's source code under an open source software license, the BSD-license, on GitHub.

In 2022, the DRM code was removed from the Gathering of Power version of the game, along with some changes to make the game more accessible on modern computers.
