= King of Tokyo =

Tabletop game

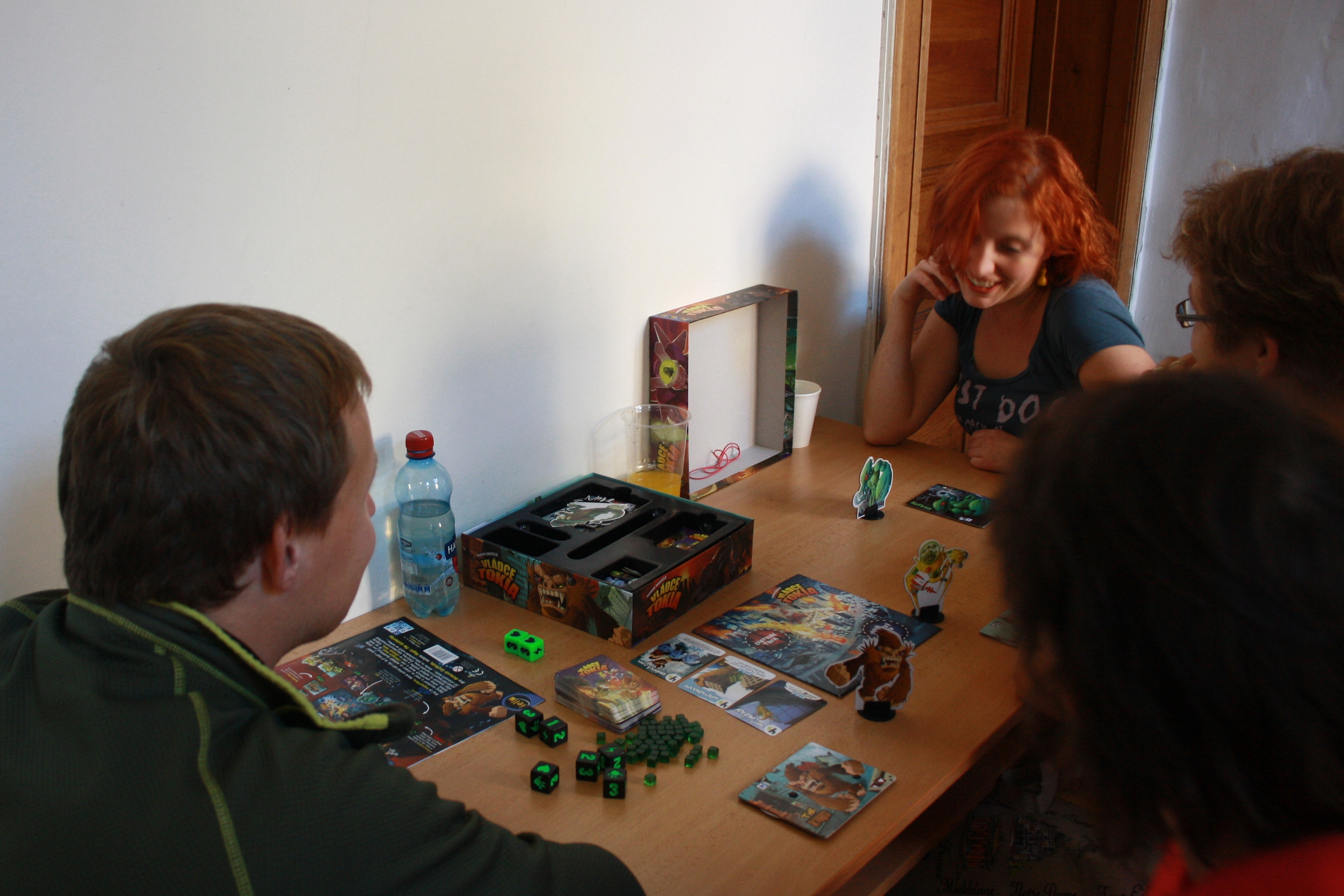
- Designers: Richard Garfield
- Publishers: IELLO
- Players: 2 to 6
- Playing time: 30 minutes
- Age range: 8+

King of Tokyo is a monster movie-themed tabletop game using custom dice, cards, and boards, designed by Richard Garfield and released in 2011. A New York City-based edition, King of New York, was published in 2014. The game was re-released in 2016, with all-new artwork and characters.

== Gameplay ==
Players choose one of the six monsters, consisting of mutant monsters, gigantic robots and other creatures. Each monster has no difference from each other apart from name and design. Players take turn rolling six dice, and may reroll some of them as they wish, as in the dice game Yahtzee.

Die faces are energy, health, attack, 1, 2, and 3. Rolling an energy icon allows the active player to collect energy tokens equal to the number of energy icons they rolled; these tokens are used to buy power cards. Rolling a health icon restores the active player's health by one each, to the maximum of 10. Rolling an attack icon while Tokyo is unoccupied gives a player the opportunity to occupy "Tokyo City" and gain a victory point. Once "Tokyo City" is occupied, any attack icon rolled will result in damage to either the player in Tokyo or all players not in Tokyo, depending on whose turn it is, equal to the number of attack icons rolled. When a player outside of Tokyo rolls any number of attack icons while Tokyo is already occupied, that player also gets to choose whether to take over the spot at the expense of the previous occupier. Rolling three 1s grants the player 1 victory point, three 2s are worth 2 points, and three 3s score 3. Any additional same-numbered die face scores 1 victory point each.

Being in Tokyo gives a player a number of advantages, such as two victory points for starting their turn in Tokyo and the ability to attack all players not in Tokyo. On the flip side, the player in Tokyo cannot heal by rolling dice, i.e. any health icon they roll does nothing, and will always be targeted by other players' attack rolls. When a player's health hits zero, that player is out of the game and cannot take any further turns. There are two occupation spots in Tokyo, with the second spot, dubbed "Tokyo Bay", only available so long as there are more than four players.

The winner is the first player to collect 20 victory points or the last player still in play.

== Editions ==
- The first edition of King of Tokyo includes six monsters: Alienoid, Cyber Bunny, Gigazaur (based on Godzilla), The King (based on King Kong), Kraken (based on Cthulhu), and Meka Dragon.
- The second edition of King of Tokyo features new artwork and introduces two new monsters Cyber Kitty and Space Penguin, replacing Cyber Bunny and Kraken. Target (USA) had a special release which replaced Gigazaur with Baby Gigazaur.
- King of Tokyo Dark Edition is a limited-print standalone game released in 2020. It is essentially a reprint of the first edition, with all six monsters from that edition, including Cyber Bunny and Kraken. It features new artwork and also introduces the new wickedness gameplay mechanic.
- King of Tokyo Monster Box is a compilation of the game released in 2021. This version includes the base game set (2nd edition), the Power Up! expansion, the Halloween collector pack, and the Baby Gigazaur monster, in addition to 11 exclusive power cards and a dice tray.
- King of Tokyo: Godzilla is a special edition standalone game released in 2026, featuring Godzilla, Mothra, King Ghidorah, and other classic ToHo Kaiju. This version is fully stylized with 1950-70s Showa era art and game pieces. The 6 new monsters each have their Evolution cards already packed into this edition. Some rules from prior King of Tokyo games, such as die tokens from King of Tokyo: Duel and event cards from King of Monster Island, are introduced to classic King of Tokyo gameplay.

== Spin-offs ==
- 2014's King of New York is a standalone game with identical gameplay mechanics and introduces six new monsters (Captain Fish, Sheriff, Kong, Mantis, Rob, and Drakonis) attacking the boroughs of New York City. The new features in this standalone game include buildings to destroy and human military forces that can fight back. The Power Up expansion for King of New York, released in 2016, adds one new monster (Mega Shark) and includes 56 evolution cards for all seven monsters.
- 2022's King of Monster Island is a standalone game with similar gameplay mechanics using giant monsters, but also featuring a cooperative gameplay. It differs from the other games in that rather than battle each other, players team up to battle boss monsters. The gameplay mechanics unique to this game include Fame for players' monsters and boss monsters alike, in addition to exclusive power cards and event cards. Also includes five new monsters and three boss monsters.
- 2024's King of Tokyo: Origins is a standalone game with largely identical gameplay mechanics to the original game, but with a more compact packaging and a more streamlined gameplay. This was designed to be an entry point for new players and is for up to four players. Includes four new monsters and fourteen new power cards, the latter of which can be combined with the original game.
- 2024's King of Tokyo: Duel is a standalone game with unique gameplay mechanics designed for a two-player game. The gameplay mechanics unique to this game include Fame and Destruction, both of which will affect the outcome of the game. Unlike in the original game, each monster in this game has different health stats and unique abilities. Comparing the game to the original, "Tabletok Games" wrote, "The game offers a solution to the issue the original King of Tokyo had this player count. Replacing the king of the hill mechanic with this tug of war version makes this version so much more enjoyable for 2 players."
- 2026's King of Tokyo: Duel - Tokyo Bay is an expandalone game that shakes up the gameplay introduced in King of Tokyo: Duel. It features a new twist on the tug of war mechanic, 6 new monsters with unique abilities/stats, a full deck of power cards, and support tokens. This version is fully compatible with the first King of Tokyo: Duel set, so monsters from Tokyo Bay can be used in the first set and vice versa.

== Expansions ==
- 2012's Power Up! introduces 56 evolution cards, 7 tokens, and a new monster: Pandakaï. Re-released in 2017 with updated art as per the second edition of King of Tokyo and including 72 evolution cards.
- 2013's Halloween collector pack includes two new monsters, Pumpkin Jack and Boogie Woogie (based on Oogie Boogie from The Nightmare Before Christmas), and their 16 evolution cards; 12 new costume power cards; a promo card for King of New York, and 6 orange dice. Re-released in 2017 with updated art as per the second edition of King of Tokyo.
- 2017 - Monster Pack 1: Cthulhu is a mini-expansion for both King of Tokyo and King of New York. It includes a new monster, Cthulhu, with a player board and Evolution cards to use with the Power Up expansion to either base set. It also includes double-sided Cultist/Temple tiles that offer bonuses, plus Madness tokens given out by certain Evolution cards to affect other players' dice rolls.
- 2017 - Monster Pack 2: King Kong is a mini-expansion for both King of Tokyo and King of New York. It includes a new monster, the original King Kong of film, with a player board and Evolution cards to use with the Power Up expansion to either base set. It also includes Tokyo Tower for King of Tokyo and Empire State Building for King of New York, which are used for a new victory condition, where players try to obtain levels of the buildings during their turns. The first player to obtain all three levels of buildings wins.
- 2018 - Monster Pack 3: Anubis is a mini-expansion for both King of Tokyo and King of New York. It includes a new monster, Anubis, with a player board and Evolution cards to use with the Power Up expansion to either base set. It also includes a Die of Fate (pyramid-shaped die that causes certain effects when rolled with other dice), Curse Cards (revealed when a certain face appears on the Die of Fate), and the Golden Scarab Card.
- 2019 - Monster Pack 4: Cybertooth is a mini-expansion for both King of Tokyo and King of New York. It includes a new monster, a mechanical smilodon called Cybertooth, with a player board and Evolution cards to use with the Power Up expansion to either base set. It also includes a Berserk Die, which brings offense to a fiercer level.
- 2022 - King of Tokyo: Even More Wicked! is a micro-expansion that adds the wickedness gameplay mechanic, previously introduced in the Dark Edition, to the base game.
- 2025 - Monster Pack 5: Luchador is a mini-expansion for both King of Tokyo and King of New York. It includes a new monster, Luchador, with its own player board and Evolution cards for either base set. It features a mask mechanic where players can steal each other's masks by winning a mini wrestling battle. Thus, it also includes a small deck of wrestling attacks to use.
- 2025 - Mindbug is a crossover expansion for King of Tokyo. It introduces 3 new monsters with their related Evolution cards from the Mindbug card game series. Along with new monsters, it introduces Mindbug tokens, a new set of Consumable power cards, and a small set of power cards related to the newly added Mindbug tokens. Conversely, Mindbug also received its own King of Tokyo expansion.

== Awards ==
- Golden Geek
  - Best Children's Game (2012)
  - Best Family Board Game (2012)
  - Best Party Game (2012)
- Ludoteca Ideale (2012)
- Nederlandse Spellenprijs: Best Family Game (2013)

== Honors ==
- Golden Geek
  - Best Party Board Game Nominee (2011)
  - Best Board Game Artwork/Presentation Nominee (2012)
  - Best Children's Board Game Nominee (2012)
  - Best Family Board Game Nominee (2012)
  - Best Party Board Game Nominee (2012)
  - Best Thematic Board Game Nominee (2012)
- Japan Boardgame Prize Voters' Selection Nominee (2011)
- Lucca Games Best Family Game Nominee (2011)
- Lys Grand Public Finalist (2011)
- As d'Or - Jeu de l'Année Nominee (2012)
- Gouden Ludo Nominee (2012)
- Boardgames Australia Awards Best International Game Nominee (2013)
- Juego del Año Tico Nominee (2013)
- Nederlandse Spellenprijs Best Family Game Nominee (2013)

== Reception ==
A board game review in The Wirecutter stated that the game has "a host of wacky characters" that make it fun, but that players could be sidelined by being eliminated early in the game.
