= Key Largo (board game) =

2005 board game

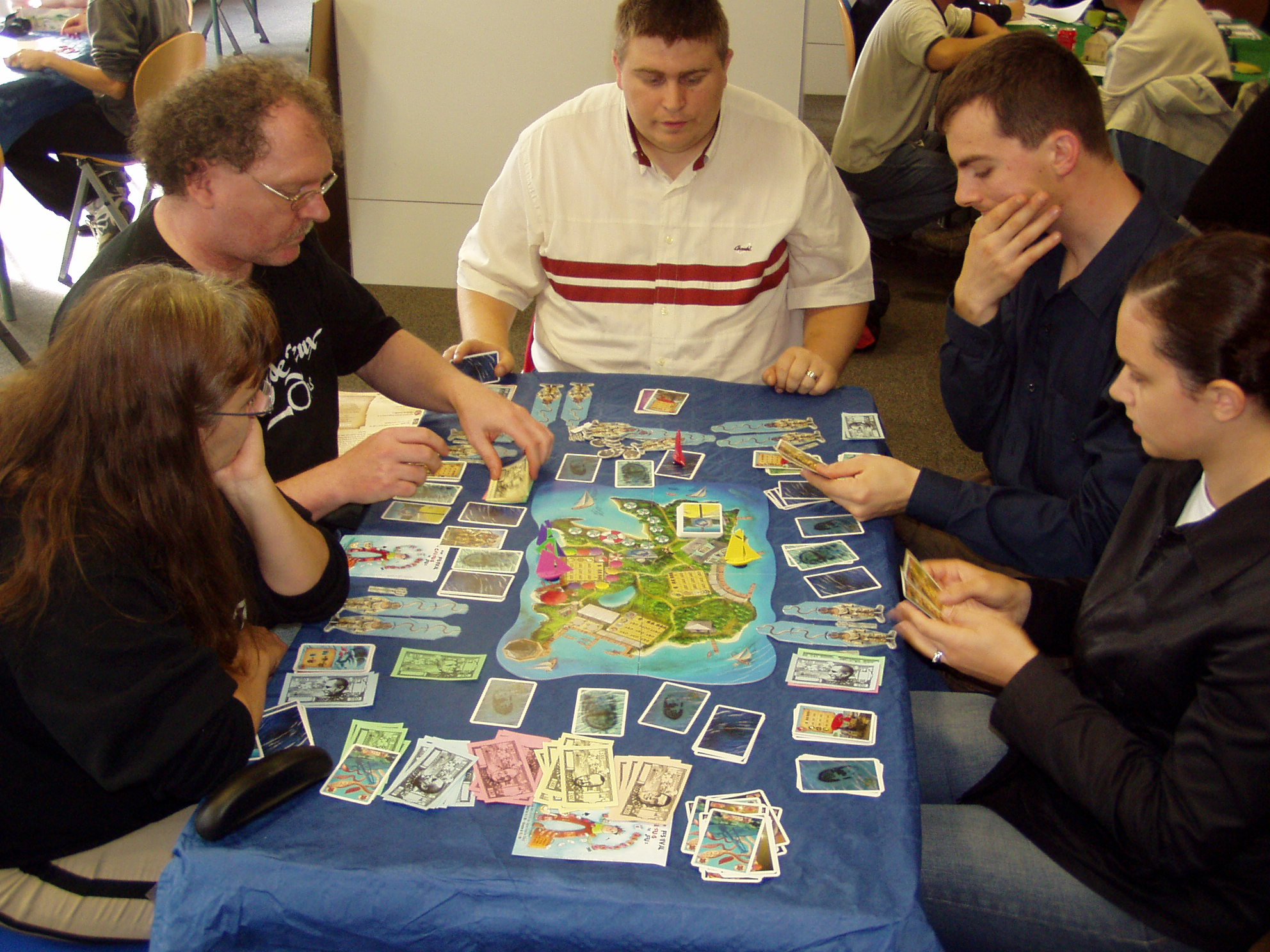
- Designers: Paul Randles< br />Mike Selinker; Bruno Faidutti
- Publishers: Tilsit Editions; Paizo Publishing
- Publication: 2008; 18 years ago
- Genres: Board game

Key Largo is a German-style board game designed by Paul Randles with Mike Selinker and Bruno Faidutti. It was published in 2005 by Tilsit Editions and in 2008 by Paizo Publishing. The game takes place in 1899 in the Key Largo area of Florida, where treasure-hunting companies seek gold and artifacts from shipwrecks before the hurricane season. The players hire divers, buy equipment, and search wrecks throughout the game. The game has a simultaneous action sequence which lets players choose locations for their ships to go twice per day, in the course of a ten-day game sequence.

Though not published by the same companies, in many ways it is a thematic sequel to Randles' game Pirate's Cove.

The cover of the French edition, by artist David Cochard, is a parody of an illustration in The Adventures of Tintin comic Red Rackham's Treasure. Hurricane Katty is named for Randles' widow, Katty Pepermans. The faces on the money are caricatures of Randles, Faidutti, Selinker, Cochard, and game editor Nicolas Anton.

== Reviews ==
- Pyramid
