= MetaZoo =

Trading card game

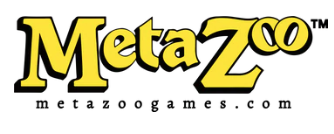
- Designers: Michael Waddell (Original) Richard Garfield (2025 Relaunch); Skaff Elias; Tyler Bielman
- Publishers: MetaZoo Games LLC (2020–2024) MetaTwo Enterprises / GameQbator Labs (2024–present)
- Publication: August 1, 2020 (Original) March 28, 2025 (Relaunch)
- Genres: Collectible
- Players: 2
- Chance: Some (mulligan, order of cards drawn, varying card abilities)
- Skills: Card playing, Basic arithmetic, Reading
- Website: metazootcg.com

MetaZoo is a tabletop collectible card game currently owned by MetaTwo Enterprises and developed by GameQbator Labs, following the 2024 bankruptcy of its original publisher, MetaZoo Games LLC. The game is based on cryptozoology, folklore, and the paranormal, centering around creatures known as "Beasties", which are inspired by cryptids and other figures from mythology such as Bigfoot, Mothman, and other fearsome critters. Following its $2 million acquisition, MetaZoo was successfully relaunched in 2025 by a veteran development team featuring Magic: The Gathering creator Richard Garfield and former Pokémon executives. The card game also previously featured a Hello Kitty-themed crossover with Sanrio.

== History ==
=== Kickstarter and Original Run (2020–2024) ===
After a successful crowdfunding campaign during the COVID-19 pandemic that raised $18,249 through Kickstarter, MetaZoo was first officially launched with the release of MetaZoo: Cryptid Nation, the first full set of the game.

In 2021, DJ and music producer Steve Aoki became a full equity partner and a designated cofounder, while Game Kastle and Hobby Games Distribution, Inc. founder Shaw Mead was named COO of the company. Highly sought-after cards and items that skyrocketed in the secondary market helped MetaZoo grow quickly during 2021, and, by the end of the year, many of its cards were among the top 10 most submitted items to the Collectors Universe card grader Professional Sports Authenticator (PSA) within a two-month period.

On January 29, 2024, MetaZoo Games founder Michael Waddell wrote on the company's official Discord server that it was shutting down production effective immediately. Shortly afterward, the company wiped its social media and shut down the Discord server.

=== GameQbator Labs & MetaTwo Relaunch (2025–Present) ===
Following the bankruptcy, the MetaZoo intellectual property was sold in bankruptcy court for $2 million to MetaTwo Enterprises LLC, with the game's direction taken over by GameQbator Labs. GameQbator Labs officially announced the game's return in late 2024, assembling a development team composed of major tabletop industry veterans. The new leadership and design team includes:

- Richard Arons (CEO) – Former Executive Vice President of The Pokémon Company.
- Emily Arons – Former SVP of Licensing and International Business at Pokémon Company International.
- Charlie Hurlocker (Sr. Director of Business / Co-Owner) – Trading card industry veteran and former subject matter expert for CGC and PSA.
- Richard Garfield (Lead Game Designer) – Creator of Magic: The Gathering.
- Skaff Elias – Former Senior VP of R&D at Magic: The Gathering.

The revamped game officially relaunched its first new base set in Q1 2025, introducing redesigned mechanics while maintaining the original theme of cryptids and folklore. As part of the relaunch, GameQbator Labs partnered with Collect-A-Con for organized play and expanded international distribution in an effort to revitalize the game's community.

== Gameplay ==
=== Original rules (2020–2024) ===
In its original iteration, MetaZoo was often compared to the Pokémon Trading Card Game due to its cartoon-like artwork, the gameplay resembles more that of games such as Magic: The Gathering. Like many trading card games, the goal of this iteration of MetaZoo was to reduce the Life Points of all opponents from 1000 to 0. The game featured "fourth-wall effects", which incorporate the real environment of players into gameplay. Examples include avoiding damage by drinking when playing the Cactus Cat card, taking damage if near a radio while using the Metal Man of Alabama card, and reducing damage by screaming while playing the Jersey Devil card.

When the original publisher was still active, experienced players could become "MetaZoologists", or volunteer tournament judges, by taking official tests to prove their knowledge of the game's rules.

=== 2025 Relaunch rules (2025–Present) ===
Following the 2025 relaunch by GameQbator Labs, Lead Designer Richard Garfield completely overhauled the game's mechanics, shifting away from the original life-point system and fourth-wall gimmicks. The revamped game transitioned into a "lane-battler" format focused on accumulating victory points. Players now pilot their deck using a central "Caster" leader card located in a dedicated Caster Zone. Instead of attacking opponents directly, players strategically deploy creature cards and "Aura" resources across four distinct lanes to build influence and control the board. Winning lane battles or securing uncontested lanes scores points toward a predetermined victory threshold. This updated gameplay style has drawn comparisons to more modern strategic card games like Disney Lorcana.

== Artwork and Card Layout ==
=== Original Style (2020–2024) ===
The original artwork of MetaZoo was heavily inspired by the style of late 1990s card games, particularly the Pokémon Trading Card Game and the artwork of Ken Sugimori.

The Artists in particular played a significant role in the game's early popularity. frequently attending tournaments and conventions to meet fans, sign cards, and engage with the community. Prominent artists from the game's original run included Poncho, Sebastian Botello, Kelsey Jachino, JoJo Seams, Pepper Deluca, Michael Peckham, Kris Kampmann, Isaac Lee, Jett Yates, and Lillie McKay.

=== 2025 Relaunch (2025–Present) ===
With the 2025 relaunch under GameQbator Labs, MetaZoo maintained its thematic focus on cryptids and folklore but introduced a completely redesigned card layout to accommodate the new lane-battler mechanics. The updated card templates were restructured to improve readability and clearly display new gameplay elements, such as specific Aura costs and lane positioning. Additionally, the relaunch introduced modernized rarity icons, improved print quality, and featured contributions from over 70 artists to expand the game's visual storytelling.

== Releases ==
=== Original Run (2020–2024) ===
In addition to the main set releases, MetaZoo released special sets in collaboration with other intellectual properties and external companies. The trading card company Topps also released a special set of collector cards inspired by and depicting art from MetaZoo: Cryptid Nation in October 2021.

Announced during the 2023 San Diego Comic-Con, MetaZoo released their promotional crossover with Sanrio titled Kuromi's Cryptid Carnival on November 17, 2023. It features Hello Kitty and other related characters.

==== Hiroquest: Genesis ====
Hiroquest: Genesis (stylized as HiROQUEST: Genesis) is a promotional crossover set released together with the concept album of the same name by Steve Aoki on September 16, 2022. Although the set takes place in the same MetaZoo universe, the story features different characters, such as Hiro, the protagonist of the story, who is on a journey to find the magical rings mentioned in the Black Pullet, an 18th-century French grimoire. The cards of this set feature Hiro and other characters belonging to five factions called Melodias, which correspond to the five musical interludes into which the album is divided.

=== 2025 Relaunch (2025–Present) ===
Under the direction of GameQbator Labs, MetaZoo transitioned into a structured release schedule featuring full expansion sets, pre-constructed "Flex Decks" for beginners, and randomized "Dynamic Decks" for limited-format play.

- Base Set (2025) – The inaugural set of the relaunch, officially introducing the overhauled lane-battler mechanics and establishing the new core roster of cryptids.
- Flex Decks (June 2025) – Pre-constructed 80-card products, including the Crushing Gust and Blazing Charge decks. These were uniquely designed to be played as a single large deck or split into two half-decks for head-to-head two-player games.
- Torrential Tides (August 2025) – The first major expansion of the relaunch. This set introduced Water Aura creatures to the field, featuring cryptids such as the Loch Ness Monster and the Loveland Frogman.
- Secret Shadows (November 2025) – The second full expansion, which introduced Dark Aura cryptids like Mothman and Anubis, alongside new terra tactics and strategies.
- Dynamic Decks: Series 1 (February 2026) – A randomized, color-themed deck kit containing 50 functionally unique cards drawn from the Base Set, Torrential Tides, and Secret Shadows. This product was specifically designed to support the game's official Organized Play dynamic deck tournaments.
- Yokai Reserve – Announced as the first "Reserve Collection" mini-set, anticipated to be released in 2026.
