= Star Wars Trading Card Game =

Collectible card game produced by Wizards of the Coast

- Cardback of the Star Wars Trading Card Game.
- Designers: Richard Garfield
- Publishers: Wizards of the Coast
- Players: 2
- Setup time: under 1 minute
- Playing time: 10–40 Minutes
- Chance: High
- Age range: 6 and up
- Skills: Deck manipulation, deck optimization, planning

Star Wars: The Trading Card Game is an out-of-print collectible card game produced by Wizards of the Coast (WotC). The original game was created by game designer Richard Garfield, the creator of the first modern trading card game, Magic: The Gathering. After its initial release in April 2002, the game was 'put on indefinite hold' by WotC in late 2005. The Star Wars Trading Card Game Independent Development Committee was created by a group of fans to continue development of the game. They design new cards that are available as free downloads at their website.

== Gameplay ==
The Star Wars: TCG focuses on gaining control of in-game arenas. In this two-player game, each player controls units which battle in the arenas. The main way to win is to take control of two of the three arenas. Some cards also add new win conditions for the game.

The three arenas are Space, Ground and Character, and feature units from the Star Wars films, such as Star Destroyers, starfighters, AT-ATs, armies, and characters like Luke Skywalker, Anakin Skywalker, Padmé Amidala, Mara Jade, and Darth Vader. There is also a build zone, a draw pile (for your deck), and a discard pile. The two sides to the game are the Dark side and the Light side, representing the two sides of the Force. There are also neutral cards, which can be used by either side.

There are several types of cards. They are:

- Units: these can control arenas and are the most plentiful card in any deck. Each unit can only be placed in a certain arena designated by color and subtype. All units have several statistics including: build cost, speed, power, health, alignment. Units must be built.
  - Space: These units have a blue border and represent the space ships throughout the Star Wars films and books.
  - Ground: These units have a green border and represent the ground forces in the Star Wars films and books.
  - Character: These units have a purple border and represent the people and aliens found throughout the Star Wars films and books.
- Battle: These cards have special one time use effects and can only be used while your units are doing battle. They don't need to be built and some can be enhanced for an extra cost to give the user a better effect.
- Mission: These cards are like battle cards, but must be built. Their effects differ and must be played in the build step.
- Location: This type of card affects its arena until it is replaced with another Location card. Most location cards are colored like units and can only be placed in specific arenas. Some locations can be placed in any arena and are not colored like any normal unit.
- Equipment: This card type represents the weapons and vehicle upgrades in the Star Wars universe. These cards have a silver border and enhance the unit they are equipped to.

== Abilities ==
- Activated Abilities

These are abilities that units have on them and are used by paying a cost (usually force).

- Static Abilities

These abilities are on as long as the unit is in its arena (e.g. A unit has "Each of your other characters get +10 speed", as long as that unit is in its arena, all your characters gain 10 speed).

- Triggered Abilities

These abilities contain a "when" or "whenever" (e.g. a unit has "When this unit is discarded draw three cards." "When this unit is discarded" is the trigger, and "draw three cards" is the ability).

== TCG Sets ==
Sets produced by Wizards of the Coast
| Set name | Release date | Number of cards | Based on | Introduces |
|---|---|---|---|---|
| Attack of the Clones | April 2002 | 180 | Episode II – Attack of the Clones | New keywords: Evade, Deflect, Bombard, Ion Cannon, Shields, Critical Hit |
| Sith Rising | July 2002 | 90 | Episode II – Attack of the Clones | New keywords: Stun, Overload |
| A New Hope | October 2002 | 180 | Episode IV - A New Hope | New keywords: Accuracy, Intercept, Pilot |
| Battle of Yavin | February 2003 | 105 | Episode IV - A New Hope | New keyword: Retaliate |
| Jedi Guardians | June 2003 | 105 | Episode II – Attack of the Clones | New keywords: Overkill, Reserves |
| The Empire Strikes Back | October 2003 | 210 | Episode V - The Empire Strikes Back | New card type: Locations New keywords: Armor, Enhance |
| Rogues and Scoundrels | March 2004 | 105 | Episode V - The Empire Strikes Back Star Wars Legends | New keywords: Bounty, Upkeep |
| The Phantom Menace | May 2004 | 90 | Episode I – The Phantom Menace | New keyword: Lucky New counter type: credit |
| Return of the Jedi | October 2004 | 110 | Episode VI - Return of the Jedi | New card type: Multi-arena Locations New keyword: Hidden Cost New counter type: Corruption |
| Revenge of the Sith | March 2005 | 110 | Episode III – Revenge of the Sith | New card type: Equipment |

Sets produced by the Independent Development Committee
| Set name | Release date | Number of cards | Based on | Introduces |
|---|---|---|---|---|
| Fall of the Republic | June 2006 | 120 | Episode III – Revenge of the Sith | New keyword: Parry |
| Scum and Villainy | October 2006 | 90 | Episodes I-VI Star Wars Legends | New keyword: Stealth |
| Battle of Endor | June 2007 | 180 | Episode VI - Return of the Jedi | Corruption counters reworked |
| Clone Wars: Republic at War | April 2008 | 120 | Clone Wars: Volume I (2003 TV series) | New keywords: Fury, Double Strike |
| Invasion of Naboo | May 2009 | 180 | Episode I – The Phantom Menace | |
| Battle of Hoth | September 2009 | 60 | Episode V - The Empire Strikes Back | New card type: Multi-arena Units |
| Legacy of the Force: Bounty Hunters | December 2010 | 75 | Episodes I-VI TV series Star Wars Legends | New card types: Equipment - Skill, Resources |
| Legacy of the Force: Mandalorians | April 2011 | 75 | Episodes I-VI TV series Star Wars Legends | |
| Legacy of the Force: Sith | September 2011 | 75 | Episodes I-VI TV series Star Wars Legends | New keyword: INSERT |
| Legacy of the Force: Smugglers | February 2013 | 75 | Episodes I-VI TV series Star Wars Legends | New keyword: Stack |
| Legacy of the Force: Jedi | December 2013 | 76 | Episodes I-VI TV series Star Wars Legends | New keywords: Foresight, Precision |
| Rule of Two | July 2014 | 90 | Jedi vs. Sith Darth Bane Trilogy | |
| The Old Republic | December 2014 | 120 | Star Wars: Knights of the Old Republic (series) | New card type: Subordinates New keyword: Meditate |
| Clone Wars: Separatist Offensive | September 2015 | 90 | Clone Wars: Volume II (2003 TV series) | |
| Rogue Squadron | October 2015 | 180 | X-wing (book series) X-wing Rogue Squadron (comics) | |
| Empire Rising | November 2015 | 120 | Thrawn trilogy | New keyword: Alternative Cost |
| Empire Eternal | December 2015 | 90 | Dark Empire Crimson Empire | New keyword: Inspiration |
| The Clone Wars: A Galaxy Divided | March 2016 | 270 | The Clone Wars (2008 TV series) (Seasons 1-3) | |
| The Dark Times | May 2016 | 300 | Star Wars Legends | New counter type: Captivity Credit counters reworked |
| Clones and Droids | July 2016 | 120 | Episode II – Attack of the Clones Episode III – Revenge of the Sith | New keywords: Double Damage, Damage Control |
| 10th Anniversary | August 2016 | 40 | Added new cards to Independent Development Committee sets released up to that point | |
| The Force Awakens | September 2016 | 180 | Episode VII - The Force Awakens | New card type: Event |
| The New Jedi Order: Vector Prime | November 2016 | 180 | The New Jedi Order Books 1-6 | New side: Yuuzhan Vong New card type: Mission - Trap New keyword: Avenge |
| The Old Republic: Tales and Legends | January 2017 | 240 | Dawn of the Jedi Tales of the Jedi Lost Tribe of the Sith | New card type: Mission - Campaign |
| The New Jedi Order: Star By Star | June 2017 | 120 | The New Jedi Order Books 7-12 | New keyword: Focus |
| The Old Republic: Days and Nights | December 2017 | 150 | Knights of the Old Republic (comics) | New keyword: Forewarning |
| The Clone Wars: Battle Lines | April 2018 | 270 | The Clone Wars (2008 TV series) (Seasons 4-6) | New keywords: Ambush, Protect |
| Rogue One | June 2018 | 180 | Rogue One | New card type: Equipment - Trait New keyword: Resilience |
| Battle of Starkiller Base | August 2018 | 105 | Episode VII - The Force Awakens | New keyword: Ferocity |
| The Last Jedi | December 2018 | 210 | Episode VIII - The Last Jedi | New keywords: Backfire, Fortitude |
| Spark of Rebellion | July 2019 | 180 | Star Wars Rebels (seasons 1 and 2) | |
| Battlefront | August 2019 | 90 | Star Wars: Battlefront | New keywords: Reduced Cost and Area Damage |
| Jedi Knight | October 2019 | 90 | Jedi Knight video games | New keyword: Riposte |
| The New Jedi Order: The Unifying Force | December 2019 | 120 | New Jedi Order books 13-19 | New keywords: Intimidation and Redirect |
| Battle of Crait | April 2020 | 150 | The Last Jedi (second half) | |
| Solo | September 2020 | 180 | Solo: A Star Wars Story | New keyword: Cunning |
| The Old Republic: Knights and Exiles | December 2020 | 180 | Star Wars: Knights of the Old Republic (series) | New keyword: Redemption counters |
| The Mandalorian | April 2021 | 240 | The Mandalorian (season 1) | |
| The Rise of Skywalker | May 2021 | 210 | Episode IX - The Rise of Skywalker | New keyword: Absorb |
| 15th Anniversary | August 2021 | 90 | Fan choice cards | |
| Apprentices and Assassins | September 2021 | 150 | Episode I - The Phantom Menace Star Wars: Jedi Apprentice (books) Jedi Quest (books) | New keyword: Persuade |
| Fires of Rebellion | November 2021 | 180 | Star Wars Rebels (seasons 3 and 4) | |
| Battle of the Sarlacc | December 2021 | 120 | Episode VI - Return of the Jedi | New keyword: Surge |
| The Mandalorian Way | April 2022 | 210 | The Mandalorian (Season 2) | |
| The Book of Boba Fett | September 2022 | 150 | The Book of Boba Fett | |
| Battle at Exegol | April 2023 | 180 | Episode IX - The Rise of Skywalker | New keyword: Barrage |
| A Long Time Ago | October 2023 | 450 | Episodes I-IX | |
| Union | May 2024 | 180 | Episodes I-IX Expanded Universe (including Star Wars Legends) | |
| Obi-Wan Kenobi | February 2025 | 105 | Obi-Wan Kenobi (miniseries) | |
| Legacy | December 2025 | 300 | Star Wars: Legacy | New keywords: Overload, Tenacity |

Minisets produced by the Independent Development Committee
| Set Name | Release Date | Number of Cards | Based On | Notes |
|---|---|---|---|---|
| Imperial Assault | May 2022 | 30 | Star Wars Imperial Assault (tabletop game) | |
| Empire at War | October 2022 | 30 | Star Wars: Empire at War | |
| Boonta Eve Podrace | December 2022 | 30 | Episode I – The Phantom Menace | New keyword: Velocity |
| Galactic Podracing Circuit | December 2022 | 30 | Episode I – The Phantom Menace Star Wars Episode I: Racer Star Wars Racer Revenge | |
| Doctor Aphra | June 2023 | 30 | Doctor Aphra (comics) | |
| Visions | January 2024 | 30 | Star Wars: Visions (Season 1) | New keyword: Deploy |
| Visions Vol. 2 | April 2024 | 30 | Star Wars Visions (Season 2) | New keyword: Last Stand |
| Darth Vader: Shadows and Secrets | April 2025 | 30 | Darth Vader (comics) | |
| Halloween | October 2025 | 31 | Expanded Universe (including Star Wars Legends) | New keyword: Consume |

Non-Star Wars sets produced by the Independent Development Committee
| Set name | Release date | Number of cards | Based on |
|---|---|---|---|
| Marvel Cinematic Universe | December 2019 | 90 | Marvel Cinematic Universe |
| Avengers: Endgame | April 2020 | 300 | Avengers: Endgame |
| Spider-Man | April 2022 | 30 | Spider-Man (film series) |

== Playing the game ==
This is a two-player game. The following is recommended for each player, but can be shared among friends and opponents in casual play:

- two sixty-card decks (one Light side, one Dark side)
- several dice (six sided)
- a method of tracking Force points (counters, pen and paper, or a twenty sided die)
- damage counters
- build counters (can be the same as damage counters)

== Reviews ==
- Pyramid
- Syfy ("Attack of the Clones")
