= Astral Tournament =

- Title menu for Astral Tournament
- Developer: Apus Software
- Publisher: Apus Software
- Platform: PC
- Release: September 23, 2002
- Genres: Turn-based strategy, Collectible card game, Indie game
- Modes: Single-player, Multiplayer

Astral Tournament is a computer turn-based strategy game released by Apus Software in 2001. The goal of the game is to beat the opponent (who can be either computer-controlled or human) in a magic duel, making use of both creatures and spells in order to reduce the opponent's life points to zero. A 30-day trial version of the game can be downloaded at the game's official page, and its full version upgrade is worth (US) $14.95. As of 2007, a sequel to Astral Tournament, Spectromancer, was released.

== Game Menu ==
From the main menu, five options are available:

=== New Duel Game ===
Starts a new 1 on 1 magic duel, either against a computer-controlled opponent (with five choosable levels of difficulty: Novice, Advanced, Expert, Master and Archmage) or against a human player. Human players can duel using Hot seat mode (two players playing at the same computer), or by internet.
