= Flinke Pinke =

Flinke Pinke is a 1994 card game published by Amigo Spiele.

== Gameplay ==
Flinke Pinke is a game in which players play numbered cards to claim colored chips, ending the round when a color's six cards are played and scoring their chips based on the final card shown in each color to determine the highest total.

== Publication history ==
The game was also published by Milton Bradley in 1994 as Quandary, and by Fantasy Flight Games in 2003 as Loco!, and Eagle-Gryphon Games first published it in 2010 as Botswana and then in 2014 as Wildlife Safari.

== Reviews ==
- Pyramid
- Trading Card Games For Dummies
