= Chaos Marauders =

1987 card-based board game

The Manic Game of Orcish Mayhem
- Designers: Stephen Hand
- Illustrators: John Blanche
- Publishers: Games Workshop
- Players: 2–4
- Setup time: 1–5 minutes
- Playing time: 0.5 hours
- Chance: Medium (Cube of Devastation, card drawing, luck)
- Age range: 10+
- Skills: Dice rolling Counting; Social skills Reactions

Chaos Marauders is a card-based board game published by Games Workshop in 1987 that is set in the Warhammer universe.

== Description ==
Chaos Marauders is a game for 2-4 players in which each player tries to build up warbands of creatures and attack the warbands of other players to loot Victory Points from them.

=== Set up ===
Each player has a mat with three lines, each with 12 empty squares, which represent the three battle lines each player will try to build. The custom deck of cards is placed in the centre of the table.

=== Gameplay ===
The players try to complete a full battle line by drawing cards from the deck. The first player starts to draw cards, and does not stop until one of several conditions happen, such a drawing a card that is already in one of the player's battle lines, attacking another player, or drawing a special green card.

Each battle line must start with a standard bearer and end with a musician. The spaces in between can be filled by warrior or loot cards. Some of the cards have special abilities, or act as random events that must be played immediately.

=== Combat ===
Once a player has completed a battle line, the warband may attack another player's incomplete battle line as long as the sum of the attacker's Attack Ratings is greater than that of the defending battle line. The attacker wins, but must roll the six-sided "Cube of Devastation" to confirm the victory. The cube has an orc eye on five sides and the Mark of Chaos on the sixth side. If the winner rolls an orcish eye, the victory is confirmed. If the winner rolls the Mark of Chaos, the victory is overturned, and the losing battle line becomes the winner.

The winner of the battle takes all the cards with Victory Points from the losing battle line, and the loser must discard all the warrior cards from the losing battle line.

=== Victory conditions ===
When any player completes all three battle lines, the game immediately ends, and that player earns 150 Victory Points. All players are then given Victory Points for meeting certain conditions, such as completed battle lines and owning certain special cards. Finally each player adds the Victory Points accumulated from battle loot. The player with the most Victory Points is the winner.

== Publication history ==
Chaos Marauders was designed by Stephen Hand, illustrated by John Blanche and was published by Games Workshop in 1987. A second edition was published by Fantasy Flight Games in 2009.

The German game magazine Die Poppel Revue pointed out that Chaos Marauders bore a strong resemblance to the 1977 German game Ogallala designed by Rudi Hoffmann, in which players must build three canoes from parts, with each canoe beginning and ending with a bow and a stern. Hoffman stayed out of the controversy, only remarking that the rules for Chaos Marauders were "too long and complicated" for the German market.

== Reception ==
In Issue 42 of Casus Belli, Jean Balczesak liked this as a light-weight game. "It is learned quickly, played quickly, and allows you to have a good time without breaking your head." Balczesak also liked the rapidity of the game, saying, "Simple, well presented and rich in twists and turns - thanks in particular to a few "special" cards - Chaos Marauders can be played in less than half an hour." Balczesak concluded, "It isn't great, and doesn't claim to be, but it's fun and entertaining enough to deserve a place in any toy library."

Writing for Papskubber (Danish for "Cardboard Pusher"), Uffe Jochumsen liked the game for its easy set up and quick play, saying, "It is entertaining and unpredictable as the battle can turn from card to card. Although it is fine to play 2, it is clearly the most fun with 4, where it becomes much more chaotic and harder to predict who is ahead."

Computer & Video Games thought the game was "fast, entertaining and very easy to play." The only complaint was that the playsheets "are fairly flimsy and get fairly tatty after a couple of uses." Despite this, the game was recommended because "there is a wealth of detail in this game and it has obviously been well thought out."

Artur Jaskólski reviewed the second edition published by Fantasy Flight Games and liked the Warhammer atmosphere, the game's portability, and the high quality of the components, but didn't like the preponderance of luck over skill. Jaskólski concluded, "The game will surely appeal to fans of unrestrained fun with as few rules as possible. It will appeal to Warhammer lovers who are mainly looking for climate and have a weakness for orcs. Other board gamers will steer clear of the title."
