= Richard Garfield =

American game designer (born 1963)

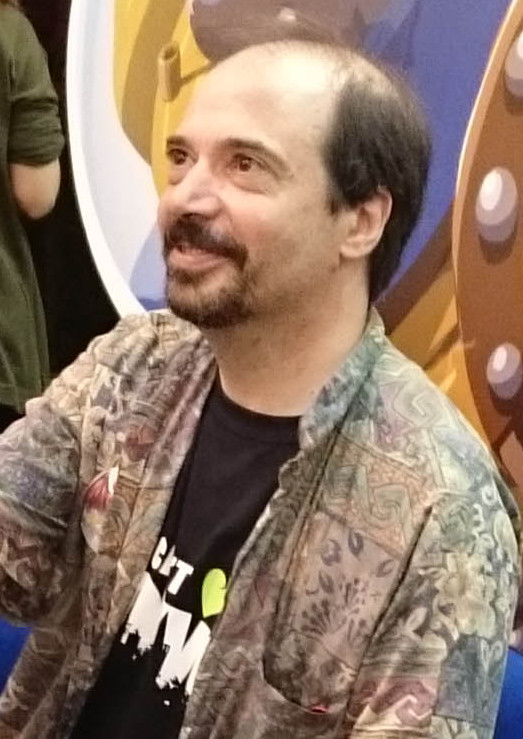
- Richard Garfield at Spiel 2014
- Born: Richard Channing Garfield; June 26, 1963 (age 62); Philadelphia, Pennsylvania, U.S.
- Education: University of Pennsylvania (BS, PhD)
- Occupations: Mathematician, inventor, game designer
- Known for: Magic: The Gathering, Netrunner
- Relatives: James A. Garfield (great-great-grandfather)
- Scientific career
- Thesis: On the residue classes of combinatorial families of numbers (1993)
- Doctoral advisor: Herbert Wilf
- Website: www.threedonkeys.com

Richard Channing Garfield (born June 26, 1963) is an American mathematician, inventor, and game designer. Garfield created Magic: The Gathering, which is considered to be the first collectible card game (CCG). Magic debuted in 1993, and its success spawned many imitations.

Garfield oversaw the successful growth of Magic and followed it with other game designs. Included in these are MetaZoo, Keyforge, Netrunner, BattleTech Collectible Card Game, Vampire: The Eternal Struggle, Star Wars Trading Card Game, The Great Dalmuti, Artifact, and board games including RoboRally, King of Tokyo, and Bunny Kingdom. He also created a variation of the card game Hearts called Complex Hearts. Garfield first became passionate about games when he played the roleplaying game Dungeons & Dragons, so he designed Magic decks to be customizable like roleplaying characters. Garfield and Magic are both in the Adventure Gaming Hall of Fame.

== Early life, family and education ==
Garfield was born in Philadelphia and spent his childhood in many locations throughout the world as a result of his father's work in architecture. His family eventually settled in Oregon when he was twelve. Garfield is the great-great-grandson of U.S. President James A. Garfield and his grand-uncle Samuel Fay invented the paper clip. He is also the nephew of Fay Jones, who, already an established artist, illustrated one Magic card for him.

While Garfield always had an interest in puzzles and games, his passion was kick-started when he was introduced to Dungeons & Dragons. Garfield designed his first game when he was 13.

In 1985, Garfield received a Bachelor of Science degree in computational mathematics from the University of Pennsylvania. After college, he joined Bell Laboratories, but soon after decided to continue his education at the University of Pennsylvania, studying combinatorial mathematics. Garfield studied under Herbert Wilf and earned a Ph.D. in 1993 with a thesis titled On the Residue Classes of Combinatorial Families of Numbers. Shortly thereafter, he became a Visiting Professor of mathematics at Whitman College in Walla Walla, Washington.

== Game design career ==
=== Precursors and development of Magic: the Gathering ===
While searching for a publisher for RoboRally, which he designed in 1985, Wizards of the Coast began talking to Garfield through Mike Davis, but Wizards was still a new company and felt the game would be too expensive to produce. Peter Adkison of Wizards of the Coast expressed interest in a fast-playing game with minimal equipment, something that would be popular at a game convention. Adkison asked if Garfield could develop a game with lower production costs than RoboRally, with the idea of making such a game more portable and easy to bring to conventions; Garfield thought of an idea that came from combining a card game with collecting baseball cards and spent a week creating a full game from that rough idea.

Garfield had been creating card games since at least 1982, starting with a card game called Five Magics that was inspired by Cosmic Encounter, and his work with this new card game built on his existing older prototypes. Garfield thus combined ideas from two previous games to invent the first trading card game, Magic: The Gathering. At first, Garfield and Adkison called the game Manaclash and worked on it in secret during a lawsuit filed by Palladium Games against Wizards. They were able to protect the game's intellectual property by using the shell company Garfield Games. Garfield began designing Magic as a Penn graduate student. Garfield's playtesters were mostly fellow Penn students.

=== Wizards of the Coast ===
Magic: The Gathering launched in 1993. Playtesters began independently developing expansion packs, which were then passed to Garfield for his final edit. In June 1994, Garfield left academia to join Wizards of the Coast as a full-time game designer. Garfield managed the hit game wisely, balancing player experience with business needs and allowing other designers to contribute creatively to the game. With his direction, Wizards established a robust tournament system for Magic, something that was new to hobby gaming.

Wizards finally released Garfield's RoboRally in 1994. Wizards published Garfield's Vampire: The Masquerade-based CCG Jyhad in 1994, but changed the name to Vampire: The Eternal Struggle in 1995 to avoid offense to Muslims. Netrunner (1996) was Garfield's CCG based on Cyberpunk 2020, where he included an element that made it an asymmetrical game, so that the two players each had entirely different cards, abilities, and goals. Wizards published the BattleTech Collectible Card Game in 1996, based on a design by Garfield. Peter Adkison was developing a Dungeons & Dragons MMORPG based on a design from Garfield and Skaff Elias, but left Wizards in December 2000 after Hasbro sold the D&D computer rights and cancelled the project.

In 1999, Garfield was inducted into the Adventure Gaming Hall of Fame alongside Magic. He was a primary play tester for the Dungeons & Dragons 3rd edition bookset, released by Wizards in 2000. He eventually left Wizards to become an independent game designer.

=== As an independent designer ===
As of 2011, Garfield still sporadically contributes to Magic: The Gathering. More recently, he has created the board games Pecking Order (2006) and Rocketville (2006). The latter was published by Avalon Hill, a subsidiary of Wizards of the Coast. He has shifted more of his attention to video games, having worked on the design and development of Schizoid and Spectromancer as part of Three Donkeys LLC. He has been a game designer and consultant for companies including Electronic Arts and Microsoft.

Garfield taught a class titled "The Characteristics of Games" at the University of Washington. It is now taught as part of the University of Washington's Certificate in Game Design.

=== GameQbator Labs and MetaZoo ===
In late 2024, Garfield was announced as the lead game designer for GameQbator Labs, a startup that acquired the intellectual property rights to the trading card game MetaZoo following its bankruptcy. Garfield and his team completely overhauled the game's mechanics for a revamped relaunch in 2025.

== Games designed ==
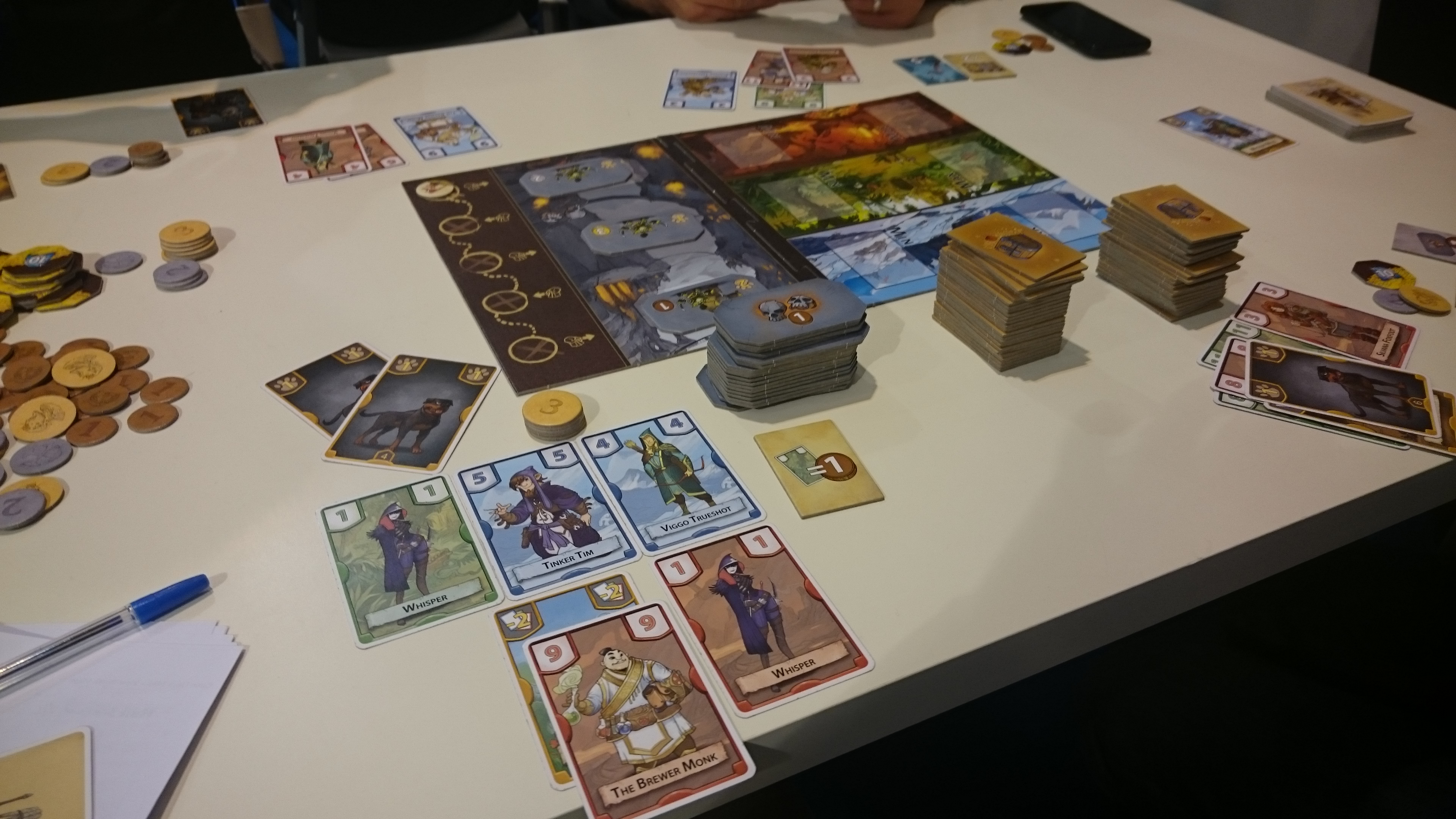
A game of Treasure Hunter in progress

A partial list of games designed by Garfield:

Card games:

- Turbo Hearts (1989)
- The Great Dalmuti (1995)
- Dilbert: Corporate Shuffle (1997)
- Twitch (1998)
- Ghooost! (2013)
- SpyNet (2016)
- Mindbug (2021)
- Creature Feature (2022)

Collectible card games:

- Magic: The Gathering (1993)
- Vampire: The Eternal Struggle (1994)
- Netrunner (1996)
- BattleTech (1996)
- Hercules: The Legendary Journeys (1998)
- Xena: Warrior Princess (1998)
- C-23 (1998)
- Star Wars Trading Card Game (2002)
- MetaZoo (2025 relaunch)

Board games:

- RoboRally (1994)
- Filthy Rich (1998)
- Pecking Order (2006)
- Rocketville (2006)
- Stonehenge (2007)
- King of Tokyo (2011) and spinoffs:
  - King of New York (2014)
  - King of Monster Island (2022)
  - King of Tokyo Duel (2024)
- Treasure Hunter (2015)
- Bunny Kingdom (2017)
- The Hunger (2021)
- Founders of Reyvick (2024)
- Magical Athlete (2025)

Other games:

- Spectromancer (2008), online card game
- Schizoid (2008), console action game
- Kard Combat (2011), iOS Game
- SolForge (2012), online digital card game
- Artifact (2018), digital trading card game
- KeyForge (2018), unique deck game
- Half Truth (2019), trivia board game co-created with Ken Jennings
- Carnival of Monsters (2019), Kickstarted (failed) and eventually released through AMIGO Games
- Roguebook (2021), roguelike deck-building game
- Dungeons, Dice & Danger (2022), roll-and-write game
- Chaos Agents (2024), an auto-battler royale released through Garfield’s game lab, Popularium
- Vanguard Exiles (2025), a two-player, competitive auto-battler game released on Steam
