= Key Largo (bar) =

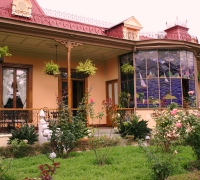
Key Largo Bar

The Key Largo is a cultural center place in San José, Costa Rica. It has a restaurant, cafeteria, gardens and spaces for the development of events and fairs.

The Cultural Center is located in a central area of San José, and is adjacent to Morazán Park on the southeastern corner. The building was constructed in the later part of the 19th century, and is representative of styles of construction for residential buildings during this time. The building was officially declared a national historic site by the government of Costa Rica on December 17, 1998.

A space that has undergone great changes and different approaches over the years, in the latter and a family, cultural and conducive environment for the development of activities linked to art and culture

According to what they say, they wanted to transform the building into a place to "promote culture and art in the central part of San José, create spaces for entertainment and support for the national artist, generate itinerant spaces for socialization and artistic appreciation, and develop projects of social action"
