= Saboteur (card game) =

Mining-themed card game

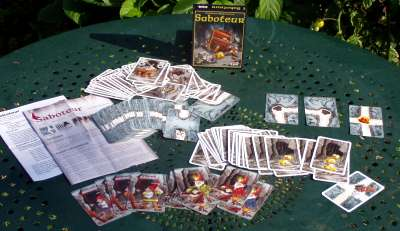
- Other names: Aranyásók, Sabotażysta, Saboter, Sabotér, Saboteur (خرابکار), Σαμποτέρ, Гномы-вредители, Саботер, סבאטור, المخرب, お邪魔者, 矮人掘金, 矮人礦坑, 사보타지
- Designers: Frederic Moyersoen
- Illustrators: Andrea Boekhoff, Fréderic Moyersoen
- Publishers: AMIGO +36 others
- Years active: 2004
- Genres: card game
- Series: Saboteur
- Players: 3–10
- Setup time: <5 minutes
- Playing time: 30 minutes
- Chance: Medium
- Age range: 8+
- Skills: Tile matching, hand management, deception, strategy, tactics

Saboteur is a mining-themed card game, designed by Frederic Moyersoen and first published in 2004.

== Saboteur ==
In the base game, players are assigned either a "Miner" or a "Saboteur" role, and given a mixed hand of path and action cards, and take turns in succession playing one card from their hand (or discarding it) and collecting a new one from the draw pile.

Miners may play a path card in order to progress in building a tunnel from a special card which represents the mine start to one of the three special cards that represent possible gold locations (only one of which is effectively gold, but the players do not know which when the game begins as they are placed face down), while Saboteurs try to play path cards which actually hinder such progress (for example by ending paths or making them turn in opposite directions).

Either role can instead play an action card, which have varying effects such as blocking other players from building paths (breaking their tools, in the game's analogy) or unblocking themselves or other players (usually the ones they believe to share the same role of either Miner or Saboteur). Action cards can also be used to block other cards depending on the gamers' opinions.

There are three rounds of play, where each round is concluded by either reaching the treasure or running out of action cards.

=== Overview and objective ===
- 3-10 Players.
- 3 rounds.
- The player with the most gold nuggets at the end of the game wins.
- Player roles are randomly assigned at the start of each round secretly:
  1. Gold-Diggers win as a team by forming a path from the 'start' card to the treasure card.
  2. Saboteurs win as a team if the treasure is not found.
- The treasure card is randomly assigned to one of the three goal cards at the start of each round secretly.

=== Equipment ===
The game equipment includes four different classes of cards:

- 44 path cards, including 1 starting "mine entrance" card and 3 goal cards
- 27 action cards
- 28 gold nugget cards
- 11 role cards, divided into 7 gold-diggers and 4 saboteurs

The path cards and action cards share a back design and are collectively called the "playing cards".

=== Role assignments ===
Roles are randomly assigned secretly by selecting the appropriate number and type of role cards, shuffling, and dealing one to each player, face-down. Players look at their assigned role card but do not share which role they have been assigned with the other players.

Saboteur 1: Role cards used
# Players	3	4	5	6	7	8	9	10
# Saboteurs	1	1	2	2	3	3	3	4
# Gold-Diggers	3	4	4	5	5	6	7	7

Note there will be one extra role card left over after each player has been assigned a role. This prevents the players from knowing the exact number of roles assigned. The extra role card is left face-down until the end of the round.

=== Setup ===
Saboteur 1 setup and playing card count

The game should be set up where the mine entrance card is separated by seven card widths from the middle treasure card, and the other two treasure cards are either above or below, separated by one card length each. Cards should all be placed in a portrait orientation.

Each type of card should be mixed with those sharing the same back design (such as gold nugget cards with gold nugget cards and playing cards with other playing cards).

After the remaining path cards and action cards are combined and shuffled together, they are dealt to the players, with the number of cards held per player varying according to the number of participants:

Saboteur 1: Hand size
# Players	3	4	5	6	7	8	9	10
# Cards	6	6	6	5	5	4	4	4

The remainder of the shuffled playing card deck is placed, face-down, next to the goal cards as the stock pile.

=== Game play ===
The youngest player takes the first turn, with play moving to their left. For each turn, the player must start by playing one card from their hand, which is one of three possible actions:

1. A path card can be played into the mine
2. An action card can be played against another player
3. Any card in the player's hand can be discarded, face-down, onto the discard pile

After a card is played, the player replenishes their hand by drawing the top card off the stock pile.

==== Path cards ====
Path cards can be classified by the number of edges touched and the number of independent paths on each card. Several cards have dead-end paths which halt the progress of that mineshaft, unless removed by using a rockslide action card.

Saboteur path cards (qty)
Edges Paths	1	2	3	4
1	(1) (1)	(4) (3) (4) (5)	(5) (5)	(5)
2	—N/a	(1) (1) (1) (1)	—N/a	—N/a
3	—N/a	—N/a	(1) (1)	—N/a
4	—N/a	—N/a	—N/a	(1)

Starting card schematic

The start card has one path that touches all four edges and a ladder, representing the entrance from the surface.

When playing path cards in the mine, they must be played so there is an unbroken path connecting back to the ladder. Each edge of the newly-placed path card must fit with the existing path card(s), connecting to already-established paths on adjacent cards. In addition, path cards are always played in a portrait (upright) orientation, but may be rotated 180°.

Of the three goal cards, only one has a gold nugget. The three goal cards are kept face-down until connected to the start card with an unbroken path. During the game, the view map action card may be used by a single player to view one of the goal cards privately.

==== Action cards ====
Action cards are played face-up in front of a player. The player playing the action card may play it in front of themselves. There are four types of action cards:

1. Sabotage
2. Repair
3. Map
4. Rockfall

Sabotage cards break the tool shown for the player it is played against. There are three tools (lantern, mine cart, and pickax). A player with a broken tool cannot play a path card.

Repair cards repair the tool shown. Some repair cards have two tools; when played, these repair one broken tool only, not both.

When the map card is played, that player may look at one of the goal cards privately, then return the goal card to its place and discard the map card.

The player who receives a rockfall card may select any path card, except the starting card and goal cards, and remove it from the mine. The rockfall card and path card are placed on the discard pile.

Sabotage action cards (qty)
Tool Action	Mine cart		Lantern		Pickax	
Sabotage	(3)		(3)		(3)	
Repair	(2)	(1)	(2)	(1)	(2)	(1)
View map	(6)					
Rockfall	(3)					

=== Round end ===
The round ends when a path connects the start card to the treasure goal card, or when all cards have been played or discarded.

- If the treasure card is not found, the Saboteurs get 3 gold nuggets each (or 4 gold nuggets if there was only one Saboteur).
- If the treasure is found, the Gold-Diggers get one gold card each.

There are 28 gold cards in total, divided into 4 three-nugget cards, 8 two-nugget cards, and 16 one-nugget cards.

==== Scoring example ====
- 5 Gold-Diggers.
- DiggerA finds the treasure goal card.
- 5 gold cards are selected at random: 3, 2, 2, 1, 1.
- The player who found the treasure card turns over the gold cards and chooses a gold card, generally selecting the card with the highest value.
- The gold cards are then passed counter-clockwise (opposite direction to turn order):
  1. DiggerA chooses 3 nuggets.
  2. DiggerB chooses 2 nuggets.
  3. DiggerC chooses 2 nuggets.
  4. DiggerD chooses 1 nugget.
  5. DiggerE gets the last 1 nugget.

=== Variations ===
==== Old mine ====
- The old mine was not as packed with gold... sometimes all you got for your digging was worthless stones!
- 6 one nugget gold cards removed.
- 6 worthless stone cards added.

==== Competitive ====
- Any Gold-Diggers with a Sabotage card (broken pickaxe, lamp or trolley) at the end of a round do not get any gold cards.
  - i.e. the gold cards are distributed between the gold diggers who have no broken tool.
- Saboteurs are not affected by this rule.
- Sabotage your Gold-Digger team for greater reward... but not too often, or your team might lose!

==== Selfish Dwarf ====
- One Gold-Digger role card is removed.
- One Selfish Dwarf role card is added.
- If the Selfish Dwarf wins, they get 4 gold nuggets and all other players get 0 gold nuggets.
- If the Gold-Diggers win, the Selfish Dwarf loses with the Saboteurs.
- # Gold cards = # Gold-Diggers (the Selfish Dwarf is excluded).

Saboteur 1: Selfish Dwarf variant
# Players	3	4	5	6	7	8	9	10
# Saboteurs	1	1	2	2	3	3	3	4
# Gold-Diggers	2	3	3	4	4	5	6	6
# Selfish Dwarves	1	1	1	1	1	1	1	1
# Gold cards	2	3	3	4	4	5	6	6

==== Tournament ====
- 5-9 players.
- Fixed number of role cards.
- 1 Selfish Dwarf.
- If the Gold-Diggers win, the first Gold-Digger gets 3 gold nuggets and the others get 2 gold nuggets.
- If the Selfish Dwarf wins, they get 4 gold nuggets and all other players get 0 gold nuggets.

Saboteur 1: Tournament roles
# Players	5	6	7	8	9
# Saboteurs	1	2	2	2	3
# Gold-Diggers	3	3	4	5	5
# Selfish Dwarves	1	1	1	1	1

=== Reviews ===
- Rebel Times #4

== Saboteur 2 ==
Saboteur 2
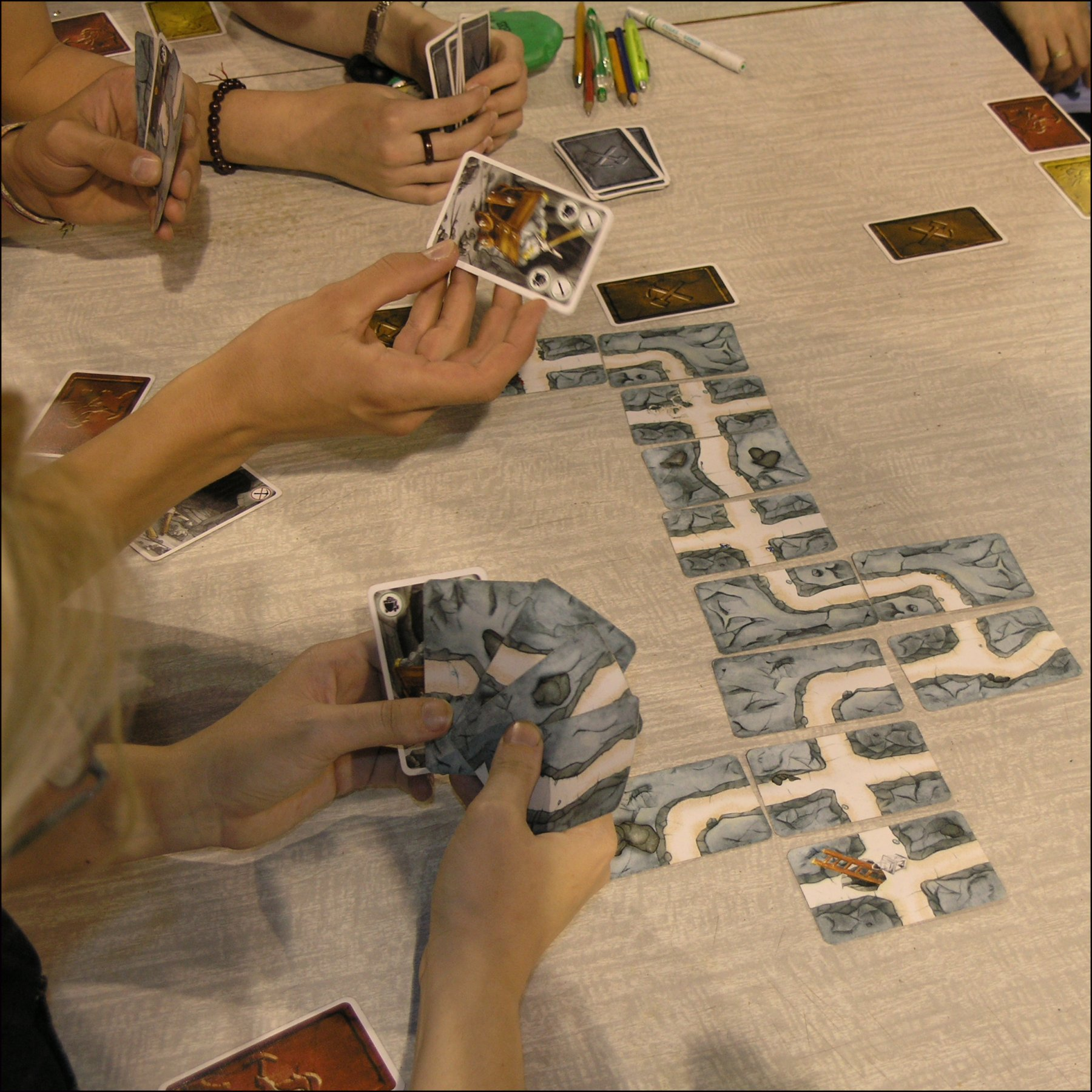
- Other names: Aranyásók 2, Sabotażysta: rozszerzenie, Sabotér: Rozšíření, Saboteur 2, Saboteur: De Uitbreiding, Σαμποτέρ 2, Гномы: вредители, Саботер 2, お邪魔者2, 矮人礦坑2
- Designers: Frederic Moyersoen
- Illustrators: Andrea Boekhoff, Fréderic Moyersoen
- Publishers: AMIGO +19 others
- Years active: 2011
- Parent games: Saboteur
- Players: 2–12
- Setup time: <5 minutes
- Playing time: 30 minutes
- Chance: Medium
- Age range: 8+
- Skills: Tile matching, hand management, deception, strategy, tactics

=== Overview ===
- 2-12 Players.
- Roles are randomly assigned in secret.

Saboteur 2 reinforces team play by dividing the gold-diggers into two teams, distinguished by color. It requires the path and action cards from original game, but not the role or gold cards.

=== Equipment ===
Saboteur 2 includes:

- 30 path cards
- 21 action cards
- 15 role cards
- 32 gold nugget tokens (divided into 1, 2, or 5-nugget amounts)

=== Roles ===
The 15 new role cards included with Saboteur 2 are divided into:

- 4 blue gold diggers
- 4 green gold diggers
- 1 boss
- 1 profiteer
- 2 geologists
- 3 saboteurs

Role	Winning conditions		
Saboteurs	No path leads to the gold.		
Gold-Diggers	Blue	Green	Both
Gold-Diggers	Blue Gold-Digger finishes a path to the gold which does not include a green door; Green team finishes a path to the gold which includes a blue door	Green Gold-Digger finishes a path to the treasure which does not include a blue door; Blue team finishes a path to the treasure which includes a green door	Boss, profiteer, geologist, or saboteur finishes a path to the treasure which does not include any doors
Boss	Any player finishes a path to the treasure.: Boss gets 1 fewer gold nugget than the other winners; Boss is sole winner (4 nuggets) if path has both blue and green doors and there is no Profiteer		
Profiteer	Always wins, regardless of whether the treasure is found.: Profiteer gets 2 fewer gold nuggets than the other winners; Profiteer is sole winner (3 nuggets) if profiteer finishes path to treasure, path has both blue and green doors, and there is no Boss		
Geologists	As explorers and scientists, the total number of nuggets awarded collectively to the geologists is equal to the number of crystals on the visible path cards. If there is more than one geologist, they split the gold, rounding down.		

=== New path cards ===
New path cards include:

- 2 bridge cards
- 2 double-bend cards
- 4 ladder cards
- 3 green door cards
- 3 blue door cards
- 6 mixed-path cards
- 10 path cards with crystals

Bridge and double bend cards have paths leading to all four edges. However, there are two independent paths per card, meaning all four edges are not connected together: only two edges are connected by a path.

Ladder cards are logically connected to the surface, meaning they are automatically connected to the start card as well as any other ladder cards in play. They can be played next to any path card except the goal cards. Effectively, the ladder card allows additional paths to the gold that can be disconnected from the 'start' card.

The colored door cards block the path for the other color. For example, a path card with a green door prevents the blue gold diggers from passing through and vice versa.

In addition, there are several new path cards with a mixture of connected edges and dead ends. Some of the path cards included with Saboteur 2 feature crystals, which are important to the Geologist role players.

Saboteur 2 path cards (qty)
Edges Paths	1	2	3	4
1	Ladder (1) (1) Crystal (1) (1)	Ladder (1) (1) Blue door (1) (1) (1) Green door (1) (1)	Crystal (3) (1)	Crystal (1)
2	—N/a	—N/a	Green door (1) Mixed (1) (1) (2) Crystal (1)	Bridge & Double-bend (2) (1) (1) Crystal (1) (1)
3	—N/a	—N/a	—N/a	Mixed (1) (1)

=== New action cards ===
Sabotage 2 action cards (qty)
Effect Action	Gold	Movement
Sabotage	[Theft] (4)	(3)
Remedy	[Hands Off] (3)	(4)
	Hands	Roles
Swap	(2)	(2)
Inspect role	(2)	

New action cards include:

- Imprisonment:
  - 3 trapped cards
  - 4 freedom cards
- Stealing:
  - 4 theft cards
  - 3 hands off cards
- Identity:
  - 2 change hats cards
  - 2 inspection cards
  - 2 swap hands cards

==== Theft ====
- At the end of the round, allows the player to steal 1 Gold Piece from one other player who has >0 Gold Pieces.
- Only takes effect if the player is not Trapped!.

==== Hands Off ====
- Remove Theft from another player.

==== Swap Your Hand ====
- Exchange the cards in your hand with another player.

==== Inspection ====
- See the role card of another player in secret.

==== Swap Your Hats ====
- Exchange the role card of any player with a random role card leftover at the beginning of the round.
- Note: the new role card might be the same role type!
  - e.g. a Saboteur role card is discarded and another Saboteur role card is drawn.

==== Trapped! ====
- Prevent a player from playing path cards.
- At the end of the round, a player who is Trapped! gets 0 Gold Pieces.

==== Free at last! ====
- Remove Trapped! from a player.

=== End of round and scoring ===
Saboteur 2: Gold awarded
# Winners*	1	2	3	4	5+
# Gold Pieces (for each winner)	5	4	3	2	1

*Note: Geologists do not count as 'winners'.

==== Example 1 ====
- 1 Blue Gold-Digger
- 2 Green Gold-Diggers
- 1 Boss
- 1 Profiteer
- 2 Saboteurs
  - Both Saboteurs have a Theft.
  - One Saboteur has been Trapped!.

Example 1 alternative outcomes
Scenario Category	Gold-Digger win	Saboteur win
Final play	The Boss completes the path to the goal card with the treasure, but the winning path includes a blue door.	The treasure is not found.
Winners	Blue Gold-Digger; Boss; Profiteer	Saboteurs (2); Profiteer
Number of winners	3	2
Division of gold	The Blue Gold-Digger gets 3 Gold.; The Boss gets 3 − 1 = 2 Gold.; The Profiteer gets 3 − 2 = 1 Gold.	The Saboteur who is not trapped gets 4 Gold.; The Profiteer gets 4 − 2 = 2 Gold.

Notes

- If a Green Gold-Digger had connected the treasure to the start card, the Blue team would have won anyway, as the path to the treasure is closed to the Green team by a blue door.
- The Saboteur who is not trapped takes 1 Gold Piece from any one of the other players (who have > 0 Gold Pieces).

==== Example 2 ====
- 1 Blue Gold-Digger
- 3 Green Gold-Diggers
- 1 Profiteer
- 1 Saboteur
- 1 Geologist
  - The Saboteur has a Theft.

Example 2 alternative outcomes
Scenario Category	Gold-Digger win	Saboteur win
Final play	A Green Gold-Digger completes the path to the goal card with the treasure, and there is at least one path without a blue door.	The treasure is not found.
Winners	Green Gold-Diggers (3); Profiteer	Saboteur; Profiteer
Number of winners	4	2
Division of gold	The Green Gold-Diggers each get 2 Gold.; The Profiteer gets 2 − 2 = 0 Gold(!)	The Saboteur gets 4 Gold.; The Profiteer gets 4 − 2 = 2 Gold.

Notes

- Even though there were no doors in the path to the treasure, the blue gold digger gets 0 gold nuggets because a green digger found the treasure.
- The Saboteur takes 1 Gold Piece from any one of the other players (who have > 0 Gold Pieces).
- The Geologist is awarded the same number of Gold Pieces as the number of visible crystals in the entire mine shown on the path cards, regardless of the outcome.

== New games and expansions ==
Saboteur: The Duel
- Other names: Aranyásók Párbaj, Sabotażysta: Pojedynek, Sabotér: Duel, Saboteur: Das Duell, Saboteur: Das Duell Schnupperspiel, Saboteur: Duel, Saboteur: El Desafío, Saboteur: Het Duel, Saboteur: Il Duello, Saboteur: Le Duel, Saboteur: The Duel Teaser Game, 矮人礦坑雙人決鬥版
- Designers: Frederic Moyersoen
- Illustrators: Andrea Boekhoff, Fréderic Moyersoen
- Publishers: AMIGO +12 others
- Years active: 2014
- Series: Saboteur
- Players: 1-2
- Setup time: <5 minutes
- Playing time: 30 minutes
- Chance: Medium
- Age range: 8+
- Skills: Tile matching, hand management, deception, strategy, tactics

Saboteur: The Lost Mines
- Other names: Aranyásók: Az Elfeledett Bányák, Sabotażysta: Zaginione kopalnie, Sabotér: Ztracené doly, Saboteur: De Verloren Mijnen, Saboteur: Forest, Saboteur: La Grande Aventure, Saboteur: Las Minas Perdidas / As Minas Perdidas, Saboteur: Le Miniere Perdute, Saboteur: Les mines perdues, Saboteur: Minele Pierdute, Σαμποτέρ: Τα Χαμένα Ορυχεία, Гномы-вредители: Древние шахты
- Designers: Frederic Moyersoen
- Illustrators: Alexander Jung
- Publishers: AMIGO +11 others
- Years active: 2018
- Series: Saboteur
- Players: 3–9
- Setup time: <5 minutes
- Playing time: 30 minutes
- Chance: Medium
- Age range: 10+
- Skills: Tile matching, hand management, deception, strategy, tactics

Several new games, including a board game, have been published using the same basic concepts, like Saboteur: The Dark Cave
