= Pecking Order (game) =

Card game

- Designers: Richard Garfield
- Publishers: Winning Moves
- Players: 2
- Setup time: 5 minutes
- Playing time: 5-15 minutes
- Chance: Low
- Skills: Bluffing
- Ages: 8 and up

Pecking Order is a card game, where players try to claim the best feeding spots in the jungle by playing their birds on the perches and determining who is stronger. It was published by Winning Moves Games USA in 2006 as the first game in its now discontinued Immortal Eyes line.

== Gameplay ==
The game is typically played over a number of rounds, decided in advance by the players. Players start the game by placing the board between them showing all the perches. Each player shuffles a set of cards (birds featuring the numbers 1-12 and a Jaguar) to create their deck. On a player's turn, they draw a card and place it on one of the perches face-down. If the opposing player already has a card on that perch, a battle occurs, with the player playing the card being of aggressor. The defender flips over their card and the result is determined by the aggressor (whose card is still face down:

1) If both played birds, the player with the higher numbered bird wins.

2) If either played the Jaguar, that player who played it wins unless both players played jaguars, in which case there is a tie.

3) If it is a tie, the player controlling the 1 point (Tie-breaker) perch is the winner.

If neither player controls the tie-breaker perch, then the tie goes to the aggressor. The losing card is removed, along with any jaguars. There are certain perches that allow for special abilities or extra points. The 1 point perch is a Tie-breaker perch, allowing the controlling player to win ties. The 3 point perch is the Vision Roof and it allows a player who wins the perch to look at a face down card of an opponent. The 8 point perch is special, in that it is made up of two perches. If a single player controls both of the perches, he gains an additional 3 points (for a total of 19). The game ends when each player has played through their deck. Player tally their scores, and gain points for perches they control with birds. However, a perch controlled with a jaguar does not gain the player points. The player with the most points wins the round.

== Reception ==
Tom Vasel reviewed Pecking Order and said that "I've played Pecking Order several times and have mixed feelings on it. It is about as far away from the complexity of Magic the Gathering that Mr. Garfield can get - simply being a game in which players place thirteen cards on the table. It's very simple and has a bit of fun, but I almost feel that the game is over before it begins. I've seen people compare this to Lost Cities and other games of that type, but I just don't see it. The components are interesting (although overpriced), and gameplay is interesting - I'll certainly hang onto my copy. But I just am left with a slightly empty feeling after games, which will keep me from playing it too often."
