= Pirate's Cove =

Board game designed by Paul Randles and Daniel Stahl

Pirate’s Cove
- Designers: Paul Randles & Daniel Stahl
- Illustrators: Julien Delval, Cyrille Daujean
- Publishers: Amigo Spiele (2002); Days of Wonder (2003)
- Languages: English, French, German, Dutch, Finnish
- Players: 3–5
- Playing time: 60-90 minutes
- Age range: 8 +
- Website: http://www.daysofwonder.com/piratescove/en/

Pirate's Cove (German: Piratenbucht) is a board game designed by Paul Randles and Daniel Stahl, originally published in Germany in 2002 by Amigo Spiele, illustrated by Markus Wagner and Swen Papenbrock. In 2003, Days of Wonder republished the game with a new graphic design from Julien Delval and Cyrille Daujean. In the game, players play pirate ship captains seeking treasure from islands and bragging rights from defeating other pirates in naval combat.

== Game play ==
The game takes place over 12 months (turns), with the goal of being the pirate with the most fame. Each player has a ship token and a card showing four aspects of the ship (crew, cannon, sail, and hull). At the beginning of each turn, a card is turned over at each island to reveal the potential booty from plunder. Each island (except Pirate's Cove and Treasure Island) offers various amounts of Fame, Gold, Treasure or Tavern cards.

Each player chooses an island to plunder based on the potential rewards of that island. If multiple players choose the same island, combat is used to resolve it. Combat involves a mixture of luck and strategy with both the ships' strengths and the rolls of dice coming into play.

Certain islands offer the opportunity to upgrade an aspect of the ship and the available plunder at each island changes with each turn. A player can use this information to predict where other players' ships will turn up and thus move their ship accordingly to either do battle or avoid it. Ships that survive combat then plunder the islands, gain fame, and pay gold to upgrade their ships based on the qualities of the islands. The Legendary Pirate, a black ship token, moves clockwise around the board, forcing captains to steer out of his path unless they think that they can defeat the powerful ship. At Treasure Island, no battle can take place and it is where ships can safely discharge cargo from their ship and bury any plundered treasure (a ship's capacity to hold treasure is based on its hull rating). Burying treasure and money adds to the player's accumulated fame points.

== Reception ==
JD Wiker comments that "Pirate's Cove is a fun game for casual and hardcore gamers alike, and the constantly changing environment means that there's no single, perfect strategy. More to the point, it's an easy game to pick up, and only gets complicated if a player wants to dabble in the subsystems."

== Reviews ==
- Pyramid
- Review in Scrye #68
- Backstab #47 (as "La Crique des Pirates")

== Awards and honors ==
- 2003 Tric Trac d'Argent
- 2002 Bruno Faidutti - - Game of the Year
- Deutscher SpielePreis award as one of the top 10 games of 2002
