= Amigo Spiele =

German board and card game publisher

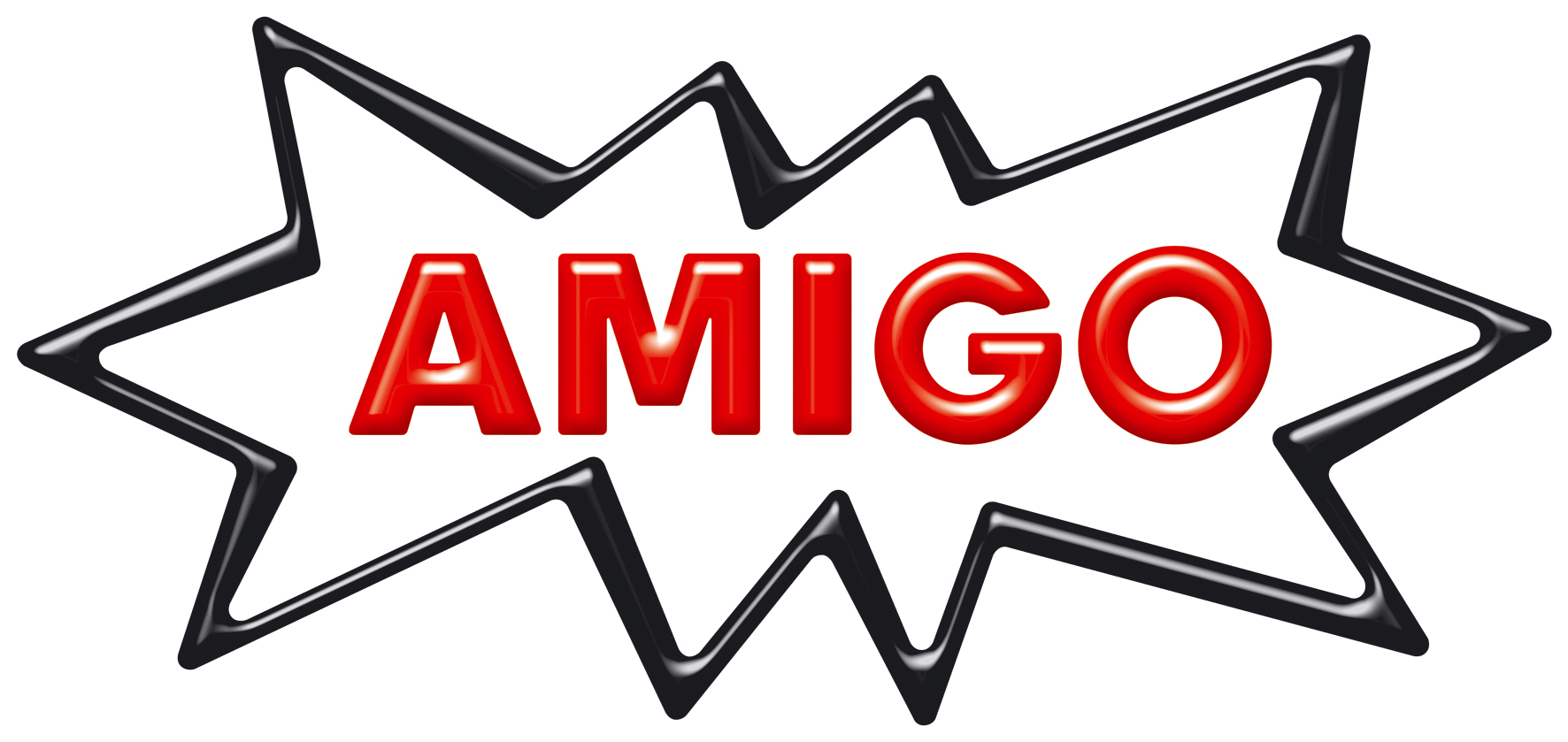
- Industry: Board and card games
- Founded: 1980
- Headquarters: Dietzenbach, Germany
- Website: www.amigo-spiele.de

Amigo Spiele is a German board and card game publisher. Many of their games have won Spiel des Jahres awards, and many have been published in English by Rio Grande Games.

== Notable games ==
- 6 nimmt! (also Take 6!)
- Bohnanza
- Café International
- Dungeons & Dragons
- Diskwars (Tabletop)
- Elfenland
- Flinke Pinke
- Fluxx
- Der Große Dalmuti
- Guillotine
- Halli Galli
- Hornochsen!
- Mü & Mehr
- Ogallala
- Piratenbucht, a.k.a. Pirate's Cove
- Privacy
- Rage
- Razzia!
- Robo Rally
- Saboteur
- Solo
- Sticheln
- Uno
- Wizard
