= Rudi Hoffmann =

German footballer (1935–2020)

Personal information
- Full name: Rudolf Hoffmann
- Date of birth: 11 February 1935
- Place of birth: Germany
- Date of death: 16 October 2020 (aged 85)
- Position: Defender

Youth career
- 1945–1952: SV Östringen

Senior career*
Years	Team	Apps	(Gls)
1952–1957	Viktoria Aschaffenburg	59	(3)
1957–1960	VfB Stuttgart	56	(1)
1960–1963	FK Pirmasens	61	(2)
Total		176	(6)

International career
1955	West Germany	1	(0)
- * Club domestic league appearances and goals

Rudolf "Rudi" Hoffmann (11 February 1935 – 16 October 2020) was a German footballer. He played for Viktoria Aschaffenburg, VfB Stuttgart and FK Pirmasens.

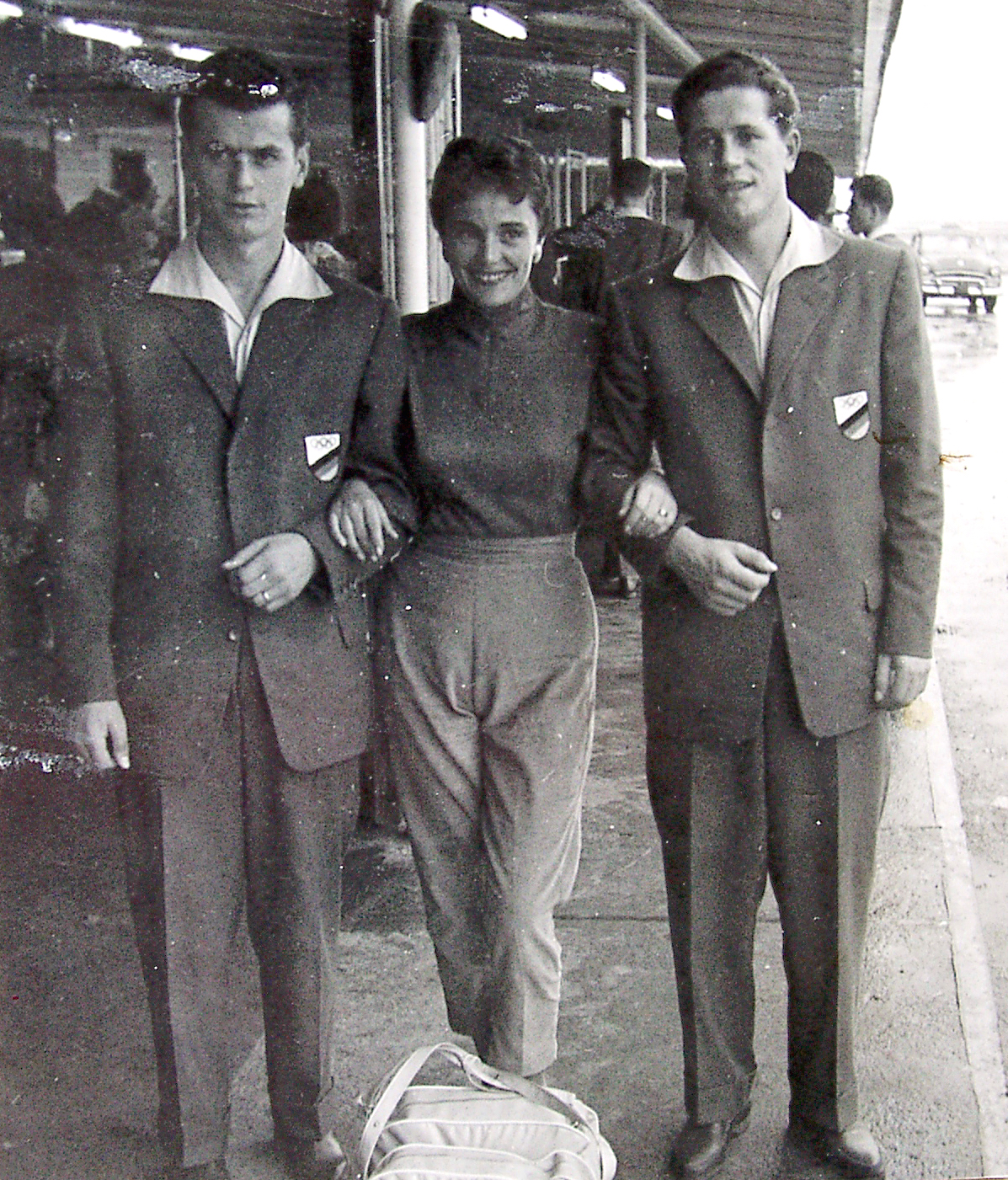
Rudi Hoffmann and Max Schwall

== International career ==
He played one match for the Germany national football team, on 28 May 1955 against the Republic of Ireland. He later participated in the 1956 Olympics. He was part of the German 22-player squad for the 1958 FIFA World Cup, but was on reserve in Germany and did not actually travel to the tournament in Sweden (along with Wolfgang Peters, Hermann Nuber and Günter Sawitzki).
