= RoboRally =

Board game

- Typical RoboRally race course
- Designers: Richard Garfield
- Players: 2–8
- Setup time: 10 minutes
- Playing time: 120 minutes
- Chance: Medium
- Age range: 10+
- Skills: Simple programming

RoboRally, also stylized as Robo Rally, is a board game for 2–8 players designed by Richard Garfield and published by Wizards of the Coast (WotC) in 1994. Various expansions and revisions have been published by WotC, Avalon Hill, and Renegade Games.

== Description ==
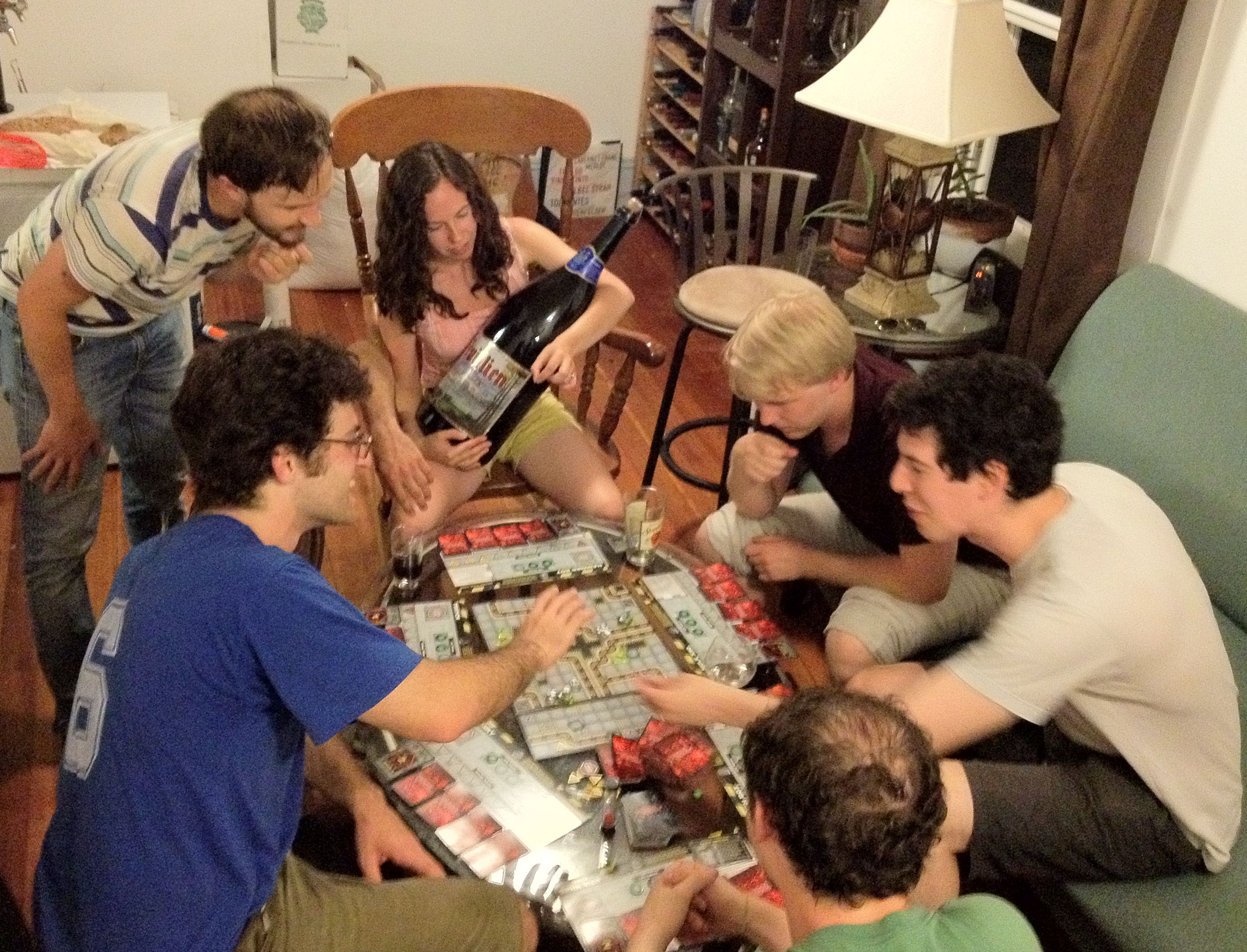
7-player game in progress

In RoboRally, 2–8 players assume control of "Robot Control Computers" in a dangerous widget factory filled with moving, course-altering conveyor belts, metal-melting laser beams, bottomless pits, crushers, and a variety of other obstacles. Using randomly dealt "program cards", the controllers attempt to maneuver their robot to reach a pre-designated number of checkpoints in a particular order.

=== Components ===
The game box contains:

- 4 double-sided map boards
- 8 player mats
- 8 robot tokens and matching archive markers
- 8 Power Down tokens
- 84 Program cards that either move a robot ahead or back, or turn it either 90 degrees left or right, or reverse its direction
- 26 Option cards
- 40 Life markers
- 60 Damage tokens
- two-sided Docking Bay board
- 30-second hourglass timer
- rulebook

=== Set-up ===
Each player chooses a robot token and its matching archive token, and also receives three life tokens and a player mat. The players choose a race course by common consent, place numbered flags on it according to the race course chosen, and abut the Docking Panel board against the side of the map indicated by the race course chosen. In randomly determined order, each player places their robot on a starting square on the Docking Bay board with their matching archive marker under the robot.

=== Preparing to move ===
On each turn:

1. The Program card deck is shuffled and nine cards are dealt to each player.
  1. For each point of robot damage, the number of cards is reduced by 1.
2. Players plan how to get to the first numbered flag, choose five Program cards from their hand as the robot's next five moves, and place the cards in order facedown on the table.
  1. When all players but one have chosen their cards, the 30-second sand timer is started. If this runs out while the last player is still choosing cards, the player's cards are chosen at random from the player's hand.
3. Unused cards are placed in a discard pile.

=== Movement ===
1. Each player simultaneously reveals their first Program card. The player with the highest numbered Program card moves first, followed by each player in order of descending Program card values.
  1. If the robot hits a wall, it cannot proceed.
  2. If a robot hits another robot, it pushes the second robot in front of it.

=== End of phase ===
After everyone has moved (called a "phase")

- the express conveyor belts move any robots on it one space in the direction of its arrows, rotating as the space they move on to.
- the slow and express conveyor belts move any robots one space in the direction of its arrows, rotating as the space they move on to.
- pushers push if active for that register phase.
- gears rotate robots either 90 degrees clockwise or counterclockwise as indicated by their directional arrows
- every board laser and robot fires a high intensity laser down the row of squares in front of them. If the beam hits a robot before being stopped by a wall, the target robot takes a point of damage.
- crushers activate, destroying any robot on them.
- If a robot ends a phase on a wrench or numbered flag, the player moves the robot's archive marker to that flag. If the robot was seeking that flag, the player now attempts to reach the next numbered flag.
- If a robot ends a turn on any repair site (a space with a wrench), the robot's archive marker is moved to that spot.
- If a robot ends a turn on a space with one wrench, one point of damage is repaired.
- If a robot ends a turn on a space with two wrenches, two points of damage are repaired OR the robot receives a random upgrade card.
- If a robot ends a turn on a space with a wrench and a hammer, one point of damage is repaired, AND the robot receives a random upgrade card.

Play then returns to the beginning of the next turn.

A player can choose to totally repair their robot by announcing, a turn in advance while programming their robot, that their robot will "power down" at the end of the coming turn. The robot plays the programmed turn, then shuts down for the entire next turn to repair itself. The robot returns to 100% status at the end of the turn. Any damage taken during the repair turn reduces the robot's current point total before repairs, and may destroy the robot before it completes its repairs.

=== Robot destruction ===
If a robot takes more than 9 points of damage, or falls down a pit or drives off the board or is pushed off the board, the robot is destroyed. The player loses a Life token, and a clone of the robot with two damage returns at the start of the next turn on the robot's archive marker. If a player runs out of Life tokens, (four robots destroyed), the player is out of the game.

=== Victory conditions ===
The first robot to touch the final numbered flag is the winner.

== Publication history ==
Game designer Richard Garfield designed RoboRally in 1985, but when he first showed it to WotC, they were uninterested. After WotC produced Garfield's collectible card game Magic: The Gathering in 1993, they expressed interest in publishing RoboRally, which was released in 1994 with pewter playing tokens designed by Phil Foglio, who also did the artwork for the game.

Several updates and expansions rapidly followed, including a second edition (1995); Armed and Dangerous (1995); Crash and Burn (1997); Grand Prix (1997); and Radioactive (1998).

In 2005, Avalon Hill re-published the game with minor rule revisions and cosmetic changes that included replacing the pewter robots tokens with plastic robots. Eleven years later, Avalon Hill re-released the game in 2016 with revised boards and substantial rules changes making the game incompatible with the previous editions.

In 2023, Renegade Game Studios obtained the rights to a number of games published under the Avalon Hill brand from Wizards of the Coast, among these was Robo Rally. The board size went back to the 12x12 inch grids but the rules remain close to the 2016 revision. Two expansions, Wet & Wild and Chaos & Carnage, were available close to release. A Transformers tie-in game was announced in summer 2023, changing to six distinct Transformers characters and their personalized upgrades and abilities. One day later a further expansion, Master Builder, was announced, which was meant to give players the opportunity to customize boards with 6x6" tiles as well as tokens of the most common board elements.

== Reception ==
In Issue 18 of Shadis, David Williams liked this "manic racing game", and thought that the components were of "high quality" but questioned the use of expensive pewter playing pieces instead of plastic tokens, saying, "Wizards did not cut corners, but it would be nice to have a cheaper option."

In Issue 2 of Arcane, Andy Butcher found that this was a good game for casual playing. He concluded by giving it an average rating of 7 out of 10, saying, "anyone who's looking for great way to while away a couple of hours and have fun is strongly advised to check this out – it's simple to learn, extremely replayable, and most importantly, a great game – although you do need at least four players to get the most out of it."

John ONeill of Black Gate commented that "all the challenge comes in the nature of your idiotic robots, and the numerous ways they can stumble stoically – nay, joyously – towards their own destruction on the factory floor."

RoboRally was chosen for inclusion in the 2007 book Hobby Games: The 100 Best. James Ernest commented: "Why is RoboRally one of the best hobby games ever? Besides being a completely solid game at heart, RoboRally succeeds at one of the hardest tricks in game design: it is genuinely funny. I don't just mean that it has funny jokes in the rules or funny robot characters. It has those things, but putting jokes in a rulebook is relatively easy. The richest humor in this game comes from the play of the game itself."

== Other reviews and commentary ==
- Rollespilsmagasinet Fønix (Danish) (Issue 10 - October/November 1995)
- Pyramid
- Casus Belli #86
- Australian Realms #21
- Coleção Dragão Brasil

== Awards ==
- At the 1995 Origins Awards, RoboRally won awards in two categories:
  - "Best Fantasy or Science Fiction Boardgame of 1994"
  - "Best Graphic Presentation of a Boardgame of 1994"
- At the 1996 Origins Awards, the Armed and Dangerous expansion won "Best Graphic Presentation of a Boardgame of 1995"
- At the 1997 Origins Awards, RoboRally Grand Prix won "Best Fantasy or Science Fiction Boardgame of 1996"

== Editions and expansions (with board names) ==
Between 1994 and 1999 Wizards of the Coast (WotC) released the original game, four expansion sets, and a limited edition board.

- RoboRally (first edition, WotC, 1994): Basic boards (6), unpainted metal miniatures with detached plastic bases (8), movement cards, option cards, and counters.
- RoboRally (second edition, WotC, 1995): Basic boards (same 6, with lighter coloring), unpainted metal miniatures with integrated metal bases (8), movement cards, option cards, and counters.
- Armed and Dangerous (WotC, 1995): Additional boards (6), additional option cards, and counters.
- Crash and Burn (WotC, 1997): Additional boards (2)
- Grand Prix (WotC, 1997): Additional boards (3), with randomly selected reprinted basic boards on the backs.
- Radioactive (WotC, 1998): Additional boards (3)
- "Origins ’99" (WotC, 1999): A single new board (King of the Hill), only given to finalists in the championship tournament.

In Europe (German by Amigo, and Dutch by 999 Games), a different series was released. It incorporated a few rules changes and fewer components to make the game simpler. The damage and life tokens are larger and thicker than those of the original American release. The movement cards are color-coded. Forward (Move) cards have blue arrows, Backward (Back Up) cards have red ones and Turn cards yellow ones.

- RoboRally (Amigo, 1999; and 999 Games, 2000): Basic boards (4, lettered instead of named), prepainted plastic bots (4), color-coded movement cards, counters.
- Crash & Burn (Amigo, 2000): Additional boards (4, lettered instead of named), prepainted plastic bots (4), option cards.

The Avalon Hill edition also changed the cards. The new Move cards have only an arrow in the corner instead of the number with the arrow, which means you have to look at the full face of the card to distinguish them. It also has larger counters. Character sheets were introduced to track damage, life counters, power-down status, and program cards. Each sheet also contains a copy of the turn sequence for reference. The graphics have been redesigned to make the functionality of board elements clearer. The rules were also simplified to remove the concept of virtual robots.

- RoboRally (Avalon Hill, 2005): Double-sided boards (4), Docking Bay (a double-sided starting grid, one-third the size of a regular board), plastic bots (8), movement cards, option cards, plastic flags (8), sand timer, and counters. The board combinations are Chop Shop & Island, Spin Zone & Maelstrom, Chess & Cross, and Vault & Exchange.

The 2016 edition significantly changed the damage system and gave every player an individual deck rather than a shared deck. Priority is determined by proximity to an antenna token and archive markers have been replaced with respawn point tokens. The boards in this edition are 10x10 rather than 12x12, and are named 1A, 1B - 6A and 6B. The docking bay is 10x3.

- Robo Rally (Avalon Hill, 2016): Double-sided boards (6), double-sided start board, prepainted plastic bots (6), individual movement decks, damage decks, option cards, plastic flags (6), sand timer, plastic antenna token, plastic energy cubes and counters

The 2023 edition sees the return of the 12x12 boards. Some of the classic expansion boards are reprinted, while newer ones are introduced as well. The material quality is upgraded from the previous edition with thicker boards and tokens and larger cards.

- Robo Rally (Renegade Game Studios, 2023): Double-sided boards (4), double-sided start board, pre-painted plastic bots (6), plastic checkpoint marker flags (6), individual movement decks (6x20 cards), damage deck (40 cards), upgrade cards (40), energy tracking cubes (8), reboot tokens (6), archive tokens (6), checkpoint tracking tokens (6), player aid,
- Robo Rally: Wet & Wild (Renegade Game Studios, 2023): Double-sided boards (3), upgrade cards (5)
- Robo Rally: Chaos & Carnage (Renegade Game Studios, 2023): Double-sided boards (3), upgrade cards (5)
- Transformers: Robo Rally (Renegade Game Studios, 2024)
- Robo Rally: Master Builder (Renegade Game Studios, 2024): 6x6" game boards (8), tokens (17), upgrade cards (5)
- Robo Rally: Thrills & Spills (Renegade Game Studios, 2024): Double-sided boards (3), upgrade cards (5)
- Robo Rally: 30th Anniversary Edition (Renegade Game Studios, 2024): Double-sided boards (4), upgrade cards (40)
- Robo Rally: Contamination (Renegade Game Studios, 2024): Double-sided boards (3), upgrade cards (5)
- Robo Rally: Turn & Burn (Renegade Game Studios, 2024): Double-sided boards (3), upgrade cards (5)

PUBLISHED BOARDS
Board Name	Reverse Side	Year	Source Product Name	Size	Edition	Publisher
Cannery Row	–	1994/1995	RoboRally	12x12	1st/2nd	Wizards of the Coast
Cross	–	1994/1995	RoboRally	12x12	1st/2nd	Wizards of the Coast
Exchange	–	1994/1995	RoboRally	12x12	1st/2nd	Wizards of the Coast
Island	–	1994/1995	RoboRally	12x12	1st/2nd	Wizards of the Coast
Maelstrom	–	1994/1995	RoboRally	12x12	1st/2nd	Wizards of the Coast
Pit Maze	–	1994/1995	RoboRally	12x12	1st/2nd	Wizards of the Coast
Chasm	–	1995	Armed & Dangerous	12x12	2nd	Wizards of the Coast
Circuit Trap	–	1995	Armed & Dangerous	12x12	2nd	Wizards of the Coast
Coliseum	–	1995	Armed & Dangerous	12x12	2nd	Wizards of the Coast
Flood Zone	–	1995	Armed & Dangerous	12x12	2nd	Wizards of the Coast
Gear Box	–	1995	Armed & Dangerous	12x12	2nd	Wizards of the Coast
Laser Maze	–	1995	Armed & Dangerous	12x12	2nd	Wizards of the Coast
Blast Furnace	–	1997	Crash & Burn	12x12	2nd	Wizards of the Coast
Machine Shop	–	1997	Crash & Burn	12x12	2nd	Wizards of the Coast
Back Stretch	<random reprint>	1997	Grand Prix	12x12	2nd	Wizards of the Coast
Canyon	<random reprint>	1997	Grand Prix	12x12	2nd	Wizards of the Coast
Pit Row	<random reprint>	1997	Grand Prix	12x12	2nd	Wizards of the Coast
Pinwheel	–	1998	Radioactive	12x12	2nd	Wizards of the Coast
Reactor Core	–	1998	Radioactive	12x12	2nd	Wizards of the Coast
Shake ’N’ Bake	–	1998	Radioactive	12x12	2nd	Wizards of the Coast
King of the Hill	–	1999	Origins '99	12x12	2nd	Wizards of the Coast
A (Pit Maze)	–	1999/2000	RoboRally	12x12	2nd	European (various)
B (Exchange)	–	1999/2000	RoboRally	12x12	2nd	European (various)
C (Cross)	–	1999/2000	RoboRally	12x12	2nd	European (various)
D (Cannery Row)	–	1999/2000	RoboRally	12x12	2nd	European (various)
E (Island)	–	2000	Crash & Burn	12x12	2nd	European (various)
F (Maelstrom)	–	2000	Crash & Burn	12x12	2nd	European (various)
G (Machine Shop)	–	2000	Crash & Burn	12x12	2nd	European (various)
H (Blast Furnace)	–	2000	Crash & Burn	12x12	2nd	European (various)
Island	Chop Shop	2005	RoboRally	12x12	3rd	Avalon Hill
Chop Shop	Island	2005	RoboRally	12x12	3rd	Avalon Hill
Spin Zone	Maelstrom	2005	RoboRally	12x12	3rd	Avalon Hill
Maelstrom	Spin Zone	2005	RoboRally	12x12	3rd	Avalon Hill
Chess	Cross	2005	RoboRally	12x12	3rd	Avalon Hill
Cross	Chess	2005	RoboRally	12x12	3rd	Avalon Hill
Exchange	Vault	2005	RoboRally	12x12	3rd	Avalon Hill
Vault	Exchange	2005	RoboRally	12x12	3rd	Avalon Hill
Docking Bay A	Docking Bay B	2005	RoboRally	12x4	3rd	Avalon Hill
Docking Bay B	Docking Bay A	2005	RoboRally	12x4	3rd	Avalon Hill
1A	1B	2016	Robo Rally	10x10	4th	Avalon Hill
1B	1A	2016	Robo Rally	10x10	4th	Avalon Hill
2A	2B	2016	Robo Rally	10x10	4th	Avalon Hill
2B	2A	2016	Robo Rally	10x10	4th	Avalon Hill
3A	3B	2016	Robo Rally	10x10	4th	Avalon Hill
3B	3A	2016	Robo Rally	10x10	4th	Avalon Hill
4A	4B	2016	Robo Rally	10x10	4th	Avalon Hill
4B	4A	2016	Robo Rally	10x10	4th	Avalon Hill
5A	5B	2016	Robo Rally	10x10	4th	Avalon Hill
5B	5A	2016	Robo Rally	10x10	4th	Avalon Hill
6A	6B	2016	Robo Rally	10x10	4th	Avalon Hill
6B	6A	2016	Robo Rally	10x10	4th	Avalon Hill
A (Docking Bay)	B (Docking Bay)	2016	Robo Rally	10x3	4th	Avalon Hill
B (Docking Bay)	A (Docking Bay)	2016	Robo Rally	10x3	4th	Avalon Hill
Cactus	Sidewinder	2023	Robo Rally	12x12	5th	Renegade Game Studios
Sidewinder	Cactus	2023	Robo Rally	12x12	5th	Renegade Game Studios
Energize	Misdirection	2023	Robo Rally	12x12	5th	Renegade Game Studios
Misdirection	Energize	2023	Robo Rally	12x12	5th	Renegade Game Studios
Steps	In & Out	2023	Robo Rally	12x12	5th	Renegade Game Studios
In & Out	Steps	2023	Robo Rally	12x12	5th	Renegade Game Studios
Tempest	The Keep	2023	Robo Rally	12x12	5th	Renegade Game Studios
The Keep	Tempest	2023	Robo Rally	12x12	5th	Renegade Game Studios
Docking Bay A	Docking Bay B	2023	Robo Rally	12x3	5th	Renegade Game Studios
Docking Bay B	Docking Bay A	2023	Robo Rally	12x3	5th	Renegade Game Studios
Transition	Coliseum	2023	Wet & Wild	12x12	5th	Renegade Game Studios
Coliseum	Transition	2023	Wet & Wild	12x12	5th	Renegade Game Studios
Trench Run	Flood Zone	2023	Wet & Wild	12x12	5th	Renegade Game Studios
Flood Zone	Trench Run	2023	Wet & Wild	12x12	5th	Renegade Game Studios
Circuit Trap	Water Park	2023	Wet & Wild	12x12	5th	Renegade Game Studios
Water Park	Circuit Trap	2023	Wet & Wild	12x12	5th	Renegade Game Studios
Gear Box	Labyrinth	2023	Chaos & Carnage	12x12	5th	Renegade Game Studios
Labyrinth	Gear Box	2023	Chaos & Carnage	12x12	5th	Renegade Game Studios
Pushy	Laser Maze	2023	Chaos & Carnage	12x12	5th	Renegade Game Studios
Laser Maze	Pushy	2023	Chaos & Carnage	12x12	5th	Renegade Game Studios
Chasm	Stop & Go	2023	Chaos & Carnage	12x12	5th	Renegade Game Studios
Stop & Go	Chasm	2023	Chaos & Carnage	12x12	5th	Renegade Game Studios
Black Gold	Fireball Factory	2024	Thrills & Spills	12x12	5th	Renegade Game Studios
Gauntlet of Fire	Portal Palace	2024	Thrills & Spills	12x12	5th	Renegade Game Studios
Locked	The "O" Ring	2024	Thrills & Spills	12x12	5th	Renegade Game Studios
All Roads	Winding	2024	Master Builder	6x6	5th	Renegade Game Studios
Assembly	The X	2024	Master Builder	6x6	5th	Renegade Game Studios
Blueprint	Whirlpool	2024	Master Builder	6x6	5th	Renegade Game Studios
Circles	The Zone	2024	Master Builder	6x6	5th	Renegade Game Studios
Coming & Going	The Wave	2024	Master Builder	6x6	5th	Renegade Game Studios
Convergence	The Oval	2024	Master Builder	6x6	5th	Renegade Game Studios
Doubles	The H	2024	Master Builder	6x6	5th	Renegade Game Studios
Mergers	Tabula Rasa	2024	Master Builder	6x6	5th	Renegade Game Studios
Docking Bay A	Docking Bay B	2023	Master Builder	6x2	5th	Renegade Game Studios
Concentric	Links	2024	Robo Rally: 30th Anniversary Edition	12x12	5th	Renegade Game Studios
Links	Concentric	2024	Robo Rally: 30th Anniversary Edition	12x12	5th	Renegade Game Studios
Double Helix	Falling	2024	Robo Rally: 30th Anniversary Edition	12x12	5th	Renegade Game Studios
Falling	Double Helix	2024	Robo Rally: 30th Anniversary Edition	12x12	5th	Renegade Game Studios
Meeple	Straight-A-Ways	2024	Robo Rally: 30th Anniversary Edition	12x12	5th	Renegade Game Studios
Straight-A-Ways	Meeple	2024	Robo Rally: 30th Anniversary Edition	12x12	5th	Renegade Game Studios
Vacancy	Sampler	2024	Robo Rally: 30th Anniversary Edition	12x12	5th	Renegade Game Studios
Sampler	Vacancy	2024	Robo Rally: 30th Anniversary Edition	12x12	5th	Renegade Game Studios
Docking Bay A	Docking Bay B	2024	Robo Rally: 30th Anniversary Edition	12x3	5th	Renegade Game Studios
Docking Bay B	Docking Bay A	2024	Robo Rally: 30th Anniversary Edition	12x3	5th	Renegade Game Studios
Reactor Core	Discovery	2025	Contamination	12x12	5th	Renegade Game Studios
Discovery	Reactor Core	2025	Contamination	12x12	5th	Renegade Game Studios
Pinwheel	Reactor Leak	2025	Contamination	12x12	5th	Renegade Game Studios
Reactor Leak	Pinwheel	2025	Contamination	12x12	5th	Renegade Game Studios
Shake N' Bake	Spill	2025	Contamination	12x12	5th	Renegade Game Studios
Spill	Shake N' Bake	2025	Contamination	12x12	5th	Renegade Game Studios
Bounce House	Back Stretch	2025	Turn & Burn	12x12	5th	Renegade Game Studios
Back Stretch	Bounce House	2025	Turn & Burn	12x12	5th	Renegade Game Studios
Check In	Canyon	2025	Turn & Burn	12x12	5th	Renegade Game Studios
Canyon	Check In	2025	Turn & Burn	12x12	5th	Renegade Game Studios
Open Circuit	Pit Row	2025	Turn & Burn	12x12	5th	Renegade Game Studios
Pit Row	Open Circuit	2025	Turn & Burn	12x12	5th	Renegade Game Studios

=== Options/Upgrades ===
UPGRADE	SOURCE	TYPE	POINTS	EDITION
Ablative Coat	Base	Run-Time		1st/2nd
Abort Switch	Base	Run-Time		1st/2nd
Big Gun	A&D	Optional Weapon		1st/2nd
Big Jet	A&D	Phase-Programmed		1st/2nd
The Big One	A&D	Phase-Programmed		1st/2nd
Bio Option	A&D	Run-Time		1st/2nd
Brakes	Base	Run-Time		1st/2nd
Bridge Layer	A&D	Phase-Programmed		1st/2nd
Buzz Bomb	A&D	Turn-Programmed		1st/2nd
Circuit Breaker	Base	Run-Time		1st/2nd
Conditional	Base	Run-Time		1st/2nd
Converter	A&D	Run-Time (Mandatory)		1st/2nd
Crab Legs	A&D	Phase-Programmed		1st/2nd
Double-Barrel Laser	Base	Main Laser Mod		1st/2nd
Drone Launcher	A&D	Optional Weapon		1st/2nd
Dual Processor	A&D	Phase-Programmed		1st/2nd
Extra Memory	Base	Run-Time		1st/2nd
Fire Control	Base	Main Laser Mod		1st/2nd
Flywheel	Base	Turn-Programmed		1st/2nd
Fourth Gear	Base	Run-Time		1st/2nd
Frog Legs	A&D	Run-Time		1st/2nd
Goo Dropper	A&D	Phase-Programmed		1st/2nd
Gyroscopic Stabilizer	Base	Turn-Programmed		1st/2nd
High Power Laser	Base	Main Laser Mod		1st/2nd
Homing Device	A&D	Optional Weapon / Turn-Programmed		1st/2nd
Interceptor	A&D	Optional Weapon / Run-Time		1st/2nd
Mechanical Arm	Base	Run-Time		1st/2nd
Mine Layer	A&D	Phase-Programmed		1st/2nd
Mini-Howitzer	Base	Optional Weapon		1st/2nd
Missile Launcher	A&D	Optional Weapon		1st/2nd
Option Damping Field	A&D	Turn-Programmed		1st/2nd
Overload Override	A&D	Phase-Programmed		1st/2nd
Portable Teleporter	A&D	Phase-Programmed		1st/2nd
Power Down Shield	Base	Run-Time		1st/2nd
Pressor Beam	Base	Optional Weapon		1st/2nd
Proximity Mine	A&D	Phase-Programmed		1st/2nd
Radio Control	Base	Optional Weapon		1st/2nd
Ramming Gear	Base	Run-Time		1st/2nd
Rear Laser	Base	Additional Weapon		1st/2nd
Recompile	Base	Run-Time		1st/2nd
Reengineering Unit	A&D	Run-Time		1st/2nd
Reflector	A&D	Turn-Programmed		1st/2nd
Retro-Rockets	A&D	Phase-Programmed		1st/2nd
Reverse Gears	Base	Run-Time		1st/2nd
Robo-Copter	A&D	Turn-Programmed		1st/2nd
Scrambler	Base	Optional Weapon		1st/2nd
Scrambler Bomb	A&D	Phase-Programmed		1st/2nd
Self-Destruct	A&D	Phase-Programmed		1st/2nd
Shield	Base	Turn-Programmed		1st/2nd
Superior Archive Copy	Base	Run-Time		1st/2nd
Tractor Beam	Base	Optional Weapon		1st/2nd
Turret	Base	Turn-Programmed		1st/2nd
Abort Switch	Base/30th	Temporary		5th
All Aboard	Base/30th	Temporary		5th
Boink	Base/30th	Temporary		5th
Brakes	Base/30th	Permanent		5th
Calibration Protocol	Base/30th	Temporary		5th
Chaos Theory	Base/30th	Permanent		5th
Crab Legs	Base/30th	Permanent		5th
Deflector Shield	Base/30th	Permanent		5th
Displacing Blast	Base/30th	Temporary		5th
Double Barrel Laser	Base/30th	Permanent		5th
Drifting (Left)	Base/30th	Permanent		5th
Energy Conversion	Base/30th	Permanent		5th
Firewall	Base/30th	Permanent		5th
Flash Drive	Base/30th	Permanent		5th
Hover Unit	Base/30th	Permanent		5th
Laser Kata	Base/30th	Permanent		5th
Lucky Booster	Base/30th	Temporary		5th
Magnetic	Base/30th	Temporary		5th
Memory Cards	Base/30th	Permanent		5th
Memory Swap	Base/30th	Temporary		5th
Mini Howitzer	Base/30th	Permanent		5th
Modular Chassis	Base/30th	Permanent		5th
Overclocked	Base/30th	Temporary		5t
Piercing Drill	Base/30th	Temporary		5th
Power Slide (Right)	Base/30th	Permanent		5th
Pressor Beam	Base/30th	Permanent		5th
Pressure Release	Base/30th	Temporary		5th
Rail Gun	Base/30th	Permanent		5th
Ramming Gear	Base/30th	Permanent		5th
Rear Laser	Base/30th	Permanent		5th
Recharge	Base/30th	Temporary		5th
Re-Initialize	Base/30th	Temporary		5th
Rewire	Base/30th	Permanent		5th
Scrambler	Base/30th	Permanent		5th
Self-Diagnostics	Base/30th	Permanent		5th
Spam Filter	Base/30th	Permanent		5th
Spiky	Base/30th	Temporary		5th
Switch	Base/30th	Permanent		5th
Tractor Beam	Base/30th	Temporary		5th
Zoop	Base/30th	Temporary		5th
Calculated Odds	Wet & Wild	Permanent	5	5th
Diffuser	Wet & Wild	Permanent	3	5th
Edge Guard	Wet & Wild	Permanent	3	5th
Turbo	Wet & Wild	Permanent	4	5th
Controlled Chaos	Chaos & Carnage	Permanent	3	5th
Indirect Fire	Chaos & Carnage	Permanent	3	5th
Leaching	Chaos & Carnage	Permanent	3	5th
Mirror	Chaos & Carnage	Permanent	3	5th
Stun	Chaos & Carnage	Temporary	1	5th
Memory Transfer	Thrills & Spills	Permanent	3	5th
Phasing	Thrills & Spills	Temporary	2	5th
Repulsion Field	Thrills & Spills	Permanent	4	5th
SPAM-powered Rocket	Thrills & Spills	Temporary	2	5th
Splash Damage	Thrills & Spills	Permanent	X	5th
Anchor	Master Builder	Permanent	2	5th
Moon Walk	Master Builder	Temporary	1	5th
Overclocked	Master Builder	Temporary	1	5th
The Oppositron	Master Builder	Temporary	2	5th
Top Heavy	Master Builder	Permanent	4	5th
Bad Scanner	Turn & Burn	Temporary	2	5th
Field Stabilizer	Turn & Burn	Permanent	2	5th
Fireworks	Turn & Burn	Permanent	4	5th
Pit Trap Dance	Turn & Burn	Temporary	1	5th
Slow Processor	Turn & Burn	Permanent	3	5th
Glitch	Contamination	Temporary	2	5th
Radiation Shielding	Contamination	Permanent	2	5th
Tech Forecasting	Contamination	Permanent	1	5th
Wall Breaker	Contamination	Temporary	1	5th
Wire Poisoning	Contamination	Permanent	2	5th

== Online ==
A large number of additional game boards and elements are available via Internet communities, created by fans of the game.

In August 2008, GameTableOnline.com (defunct and redirected to a porn site, as of October 2020) licensed the rights for an online version of RoboRally from Wizards of the Coast.
