= Electoral results for the district of Murdoch =

Western Australian district election results

This is a list of results for the electoral district of Murdoch in Western Australian state elections for the district's two periods of existence from 1977 to 1989 and from 1996 to 2008.

== Members for Murdoch ==
First incarnation (1977–1989)
Member	Party	Term
Barry MacKinnon	Liberal	1977–1989
Second incarnation (1996–2008)
Mike Board	Liberal	1996–2005
Trevor Sprigg	Liberal	2005–2008
Christian Porter	Liberal	2008

== Election results ==
=== Elections in the 2000s ===
2008 Murdoch state by-election
Party	Candidate	Votes	%	±%
Liberal	Christian Porter	13,121	62.82	+14.43
Greens	Hsien Harper	5,502	26.34	+19.01
Christian Democrats	Ka-ren Chew	1,604	7.68	+4.33
One Nation	Neil Gilmour	659	3.16	+2.19
Total formal votes		20,886	96.78	+1.42
Informal votes		696	3.22	−1.42
Turnout		21,582	74.72	−17.12
Two-candidate-preferred result
Liberal	Christian Porter	14,488	69.39	+13.48
Greens	Hsien Harper	6,392	30.61	+30.61
Liberal hold		Swing	N/A	

2005 Western Australian state election: Murdoch
Party	Candidate	Votes	%	±%
Liberal	Trevor Sprigg	12,024	48.39	−0.99
Labor	Jackie Ormsby	8,823	35.51	+2.64
Greens	Jan Currie	1,821	7.33	−3.60
Christian Democrats	Michael Dunjey	833	3.35	+3.35
Family First	Shayne Weller	655	2.64	+2.54
Independent	Damian Bramanis	452	1.82	+1.82
One Nation	Ursula Stone	240	0.96	+0.87
Total formal votes		24,848	95.36	−1.03
Informal votes		1,209	4.64	+1.03
Turnout		26,057	91.84	+0.42
Two-party-preferred result
Liberal	Trevor Sprigg	13,892	55.93	−0.59
Labor	Jackie Ormsby	10,945	44.07	+0.59
Liberal hold		Swing	−0.59	

2001 Western Australian state election: Murdoch
Party	Candidate	Votes	%	±%
Liberal	Mike Board	10,430	49.38	−10.66
Labor	Gavin Waugh	6,943	32.87	+6.03
Greens	Felicity McGeorge	2,308	10.93	−2.18
Democrats	Carole Pestana	1,442	6.83	+6.83
Total formal votes		21,123	96.39	+0.15
Informal votes		790	3.61	−0.15
Turnout		21,913	91.43	+0.03
Two-party-preferred result
Liberal	Mike Board	11,906	56.56	−8.50
Labor	Gavin Waugh	9,144	43.44	+8.50
Liberal hold		Swing	−8.50	

=== Elections in the 1990s ===
1996 Western Australian state election: Murdoch
Party	Candidate	Votes	%	±%
Liberal	Mike Board	12,387	60.04	−0.42
Labor	Monica Fitz	5,538	26.84	−4.37
Greens	Graham Lapthorne	2,705	13.11	+13.11
Total formal votes		20,630	96.25	−0.97
Informal votes		805	3.75	+0.97
Turnout		21,435	91.40	−3.89
Two-party-preferred result
Liberal	Mike Board	13,401	65.06	−4.74
Labor	Monica Fitz	7,197	34.94	+4.74
Liberal hold		Swing	−4.74	

=== Elections in the 1980s ===
1986 Western Australian state election: Murdoch
Party	Candidate	Votes	%	±%
Liberal	Barry MacKinnon	13,600	50.79	−2.38
Labor	Mark Johnson	12,385	46.26	+1.09
Independent	Anthony Greatwood	515	1.92	+1.92
Independent	Orlando Bertocchi	275	1.03	+1.03
Total formal votes		26,775	98.01	+0.06
Informal votes		545	1.99	−0.06
Turnout		27,320	93.34	+2.25
Two-party-preferred result
Liberal	Barry MacKinnon	14,012	52.33	−1.61
Labor	Mark Johnson	12,763	47.67	+1.61
Liberal hold		Swing	−1.61	

1983 Western Australian state election: Murdoch
Party	Candidate	Votes	%	±%
Liberal	Barry MacKinnon	8,832	53.17	+4.42
Labor	Eric Ripper	7,503	45.17	+2.72
Independent	James Owen	276	1.66	+1.66
Total formal votes		16,611	97.95	+0.87
Informal votes		347	2.05	−0.87
Turnout		16,958	91.09	+0.16
Two-party-preferred result
Liberal	Barry MacKinnon	8,960	53.94	+0.16
Labor	Eric Ripper	7,651	46.06	−0.16
Liberal hold		Swing	+0.16	

1980 Western Australian state election: Murdoch
Party	Candidate	Votes	%	±%
Liberal	Barry MacKinnon	10,006	48.75	−3.68
Labor	Garry Kelly	8,713	42.45	−5.12
Democrats	Richard Jeffreys	1,808	8.80	+8.80
Total formal votes		20,527	97.08	+0.04
Informal votes		618	2.92	−0.04
Turnout		21,145	90.93	−1.59
Two-party-preferred result
Liberal	Barry MacKinnon	11,040	53.78	+1.32
Labor	Garry Kelly	9,487	46.22	−1.32
Liberal hold		Swing	+1.32	

=== Elections in the 1970s ===
1977 Western Australian state election: Murdoch
Party	Candidate	Votes	%	±%
Liberal	Barry MacKinnon	8,572	52.43	+11.0
Labor	Garry Kelly	7,777	47.57	−11.0
Total formal votes		16,349	97.06	
Informal votes		496	2.94	
Turnout		16,845	92.52	
