= Athletics at the 1958 British Empire and Commonwealth Games – Men's high jump =

Men's high jump at the Commonwealth Games

The men's high jump event at the 1958 British Empire and Commonwealth Games was held on 19 July at the Cardiff Arms Park in Cardiff, Wales.

== Medalists ==
Gold	Silver	Bronze
Ernest Haisley; Jamaica	Chilla Porter; Australia	Robert Kotei; Ghana

== Results ==
=== Qualification ===
Qualifying height: 6 ft 5 in (1.96 m)

Rank	Name	Nationality	Result	Notes
?	Chilla Porter	Australia	6 ft 5 in (1.96 m)	Q
?	Ken Money	Canada	6 ft 5 in (1.96 m)	Q
?	Nagalingam Ethirveerasingam	Ceylon	6 ft 5 in (1.96 m)	Q
?	Gordon Miller	England	6 ft 5 in (1.96 m)	Q
?	Robert Kotei	Ghana	6 ft 5 in (1.96 m)	Q
?	Ernest Haisley	Jamaica	6 ft 5 in (1.96 m)	Q
?	Joseph Leresae	Kenya	6 ft 5 in (1.96 m)	Q
?	Julius Chigbolou	Nigeria	6 ft 5 in (1.96 m)	Q
?	Crawford Fairbrother	Scotland	6 ft 5 in (1.96 m)	Q
?	Learie Scipio	Trinidad and Tobago	6 ft 5 in (1.96 m)	Q
?	Patrick Etolu	Uganda	6 ft 5 in (1.96 m)	Q
12	Colin Ridgway	Australia	6 ft 4 in (1.93 m)	
12	R. Garber	Ghana	6 ft 4 in (1.93 m)	
12	Vincent Gabriel	Nigeria	6 ft 4 in (1.93 m)	
12	Oladipo Okuwobi	Nigeria	6 ft 4 in (1.93 m)	
16	Charles Vandyck	Ghana	6 ft 3 in (1.91 m)	
16	Colin Clarkson	Sierra Leone	6 ft 3 in (1.91 m)	
18	Dave Wilson	England	6 ft 2 in (1.88 m)	
18	John Kitching	England	6 ft 2 in (1.88 m)	
20	Joseph Tokana	Fiji	6 ft 1 in (1.85 m)	
20	Saranjit Singh	India	6 ft 1 in (1.85 m)	
20	Omoruyi Odobo	Nigeria	6 ft 1 in (1.85 m)	
20	Godrey Roberts	Saint Vincent and the Grenadines	6 ft 1 in (1.85 m)	
20	Desmond Luke	Sierra Leone	6 ft 1 in (1.85 m)	
20	Kevin Phillips	Wales	6 ft 1 in (1.85 m)	
26	Terry Morgan	Wales	6 ft 0 in (1.83 m)	
27	Cosmos Julien	Mauritius	5 ft 10 in (1.78 m)	
	Paul Foreman	Jamaica	DNS	

=== Final ===
Rank	Name	Nationality	Result	Notes
1st place, gold medalist(s)	Ernest Haisley	Jamaica	6 ft 9 in (2.06 m)	
2nd place, silver medalist(s)	Chilla Porter	Australia	6 ft 8 in (2.03 m)	
3rd place, bronze medalist(s)	Robert Kotei	Ghana	6 ft 7 in (2.01 m)	
4	Joseph Leresae	Kenya	6 ft 6 in (1.98 m)	
4	Julius Chigbolou	Nigeria	6 ft 6 in (1.98 m)	
4	Patrick Etolu	Uganda	6 ft 6 in (1.98 m)	
7	Crawford Fairbrother	Scotland	6 ft 6 in (1.98 m)	
8	Ken Money	Canada	6 ft 6 in (1.98 m)	
9	Learie Scipio	Trinidad and Tobago	6 ft 5 in (1.96 m)	
10	Gordon Miller	England	6 ft 5 in (1.96 m)	
11	Nagalingam Ethirveerasingam	Ceylon	6 ft 4 in (1.93 m)	
