= Athletics at the 1956 Summer Olympics – Men's high jump =

Men's high jump at the Games of the XVI Olympiad
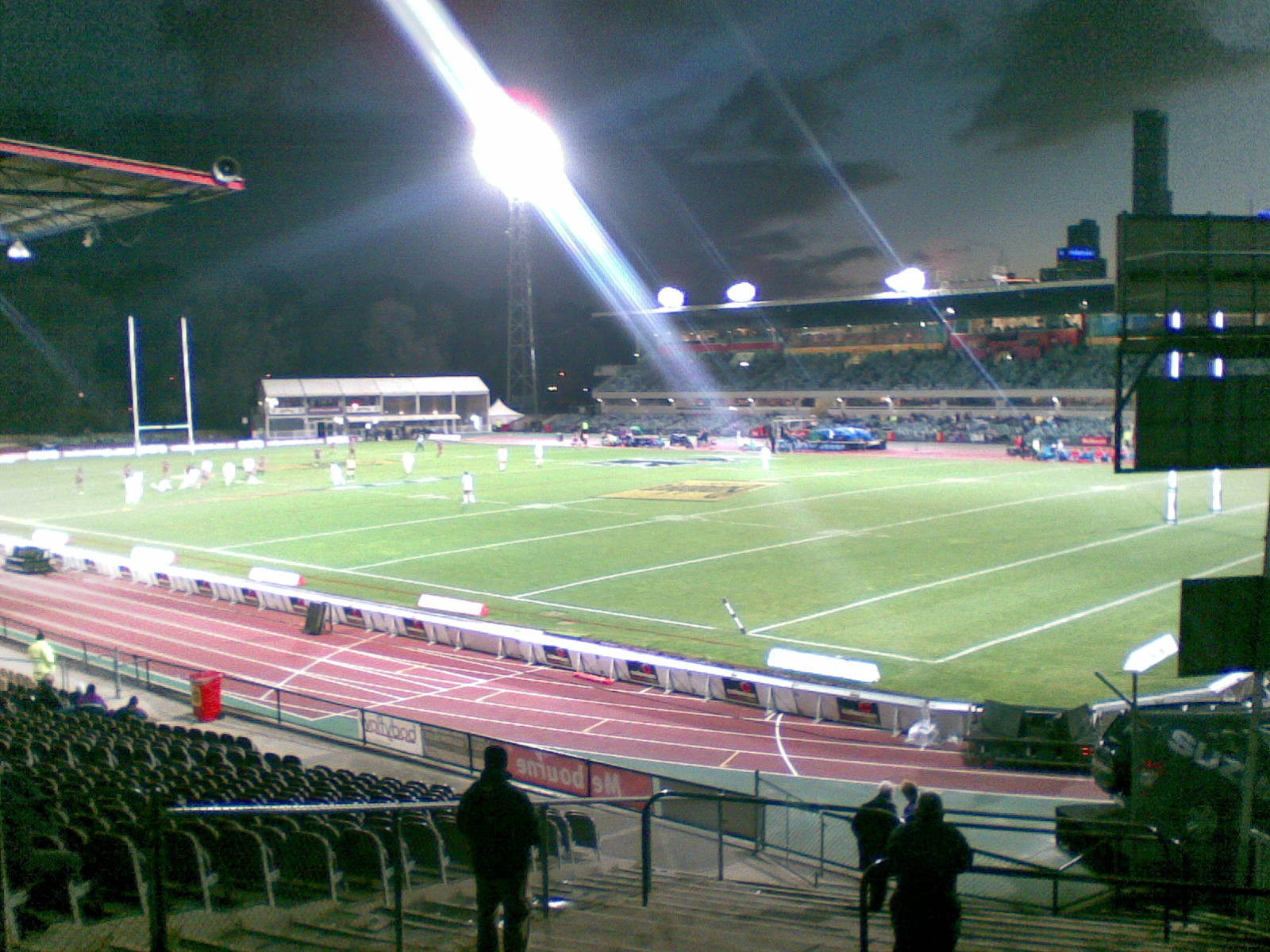
- Olympic Park Stadium (2008)
- Venue: Olympic Park Stadium
- Date: 23 November 1956
- Competitors: 28 from 19 nations
- Winning height: 2.12 OR

Medalists
1st place, gold medalist(s)		Charles Dumas; United States
2nd place, silver medalist(s)		Chilla Porter; Australia
3rd place, bronze medalist(s)		Igor Kashkarov; Soviet Union

Video on YouTube Official Video @44:10

The men's high jump was an event at the 1956 Summer Olympics in Melbourne, Australia. Twenty-eight contestants from 19 nations met on the morning of the first day of the athletic contests, on Friday November 23, 1956, and 22 cleared the qualifying height of 1.92 metres, to meet again in the afternoon. The maximum number of athletes per nation had been set at 3 since the 1930 Olympic Congress. The event was won by Charles Dumas of the United States, the nation's second consecutive and 11th overall victory in the men's high jump. Chilla Porter's silver was Australia's second medal in the event (after a gold in 1948). Igor Kashkarov's bronze was the Soviet Union's first.

== Summary ==
Charles Dumas, Chilla Porter and Igor Kashkarov cleared 2.06 metres on their first attempts. Stig Pettersson cleared it on his third. Dumas was in third place after a miss at 2.03m. At 2.08m, Dumas and Kashkarov cleared on their first attempt, while Porter dropped to third place by making it on his second. Pettersson did not clear the height. Dumas held the lead with a second attempt clearance of 2.10m while Porter made it on his last attempt. Kashkarov did not clear it and earned bronze. On his final attempt, Dumas set the final new Olympic record with 2.12 metres, while Porter couldn't clear that height and won silver.

== Background ==
This was the 13th appearance of the event, which is one of 12 athletics events to have been held at every Summer Olympics. The returning finalists from the 1952 Games were bronze medalist José da Conceição of Brazil and eleventh-place finisher Peter Wells of Great Britain. Charles Dumas was the favorite, having broken the 7-foot mark at the U.S. trials with a 2.15 metres world record. Sweden's Bengt Nilsson was the 1954 European champion and the only non-American considered a contender for gold, but he "was injured shortly before leaving for Melbourne."

Jamaica, Kenya, and Uganda each made their debut in the event. The United States appeared for the 13th time, having competed at each edition of the Olympic men's high jump to that point.

== Competition format ==
The competition used the two-round format introduced in 1912. There were two distinct rounds of jumping with results cleared between rounds. The qualifying round had the bar set at 1.70 metres, 1.78 metres, 1.82 metres, 1.88 metres, and 1.92 metres. All jumpers clearing 1.92 metres in the qualifying round advanced to the final. The final had jumps at 1.80 metres, 1.86 metres, 1.92 metres, 1.96 metres, 2.00 metres, 2.03 metres, 2.06 metres, and then increased by 0.02 metres until a winner was found. Each athlete had three attempts at each height.

== Records ==
The world and Olympic records (in metres) prior to the 1956 Summer Olympics:

World record	Charles Dumas (USA)	2.15	Los Angeles, United States	29 June 1956
Olympic record	Walt Davis (USA)	2.04	Helsinki, Finland	20 July 1952

The existing Olympic record was equaled or bettered ten times by four men over the course of the 5 hour long competition. Charles Dumas finished with the new Olympic record at 2.12 metres.

== Schedule ==
All times are Australian Eastern Standard Time (UTC+10)

Date	Time	Round
Friday, 23 November 1956	10:00; 14:30	Qualifying; Final

== Results ==
Key

- o = Height cleared
- x = Height failed
- – = Height passed
- r = Retired
- SB = Season's best
- PB = Personal best
- NR = National record
- AR = Area record
- OR = Olympic record
- WR = World record
- WL = World lead
- NM = No mark
- DNS = Did not start
- DQ = Disqualified

=== Qualifying ===
Okamona and Vernon retired due to injuries.

Rank	Athlete	Nation	1.70	1.78	1.82	1.88	1.92	Height	Notes
1	Igor Kashkarov	Soviet Union	—	—	—	—	o	1.92	Q
1	Volodymyr Sitkin	Soviet Union	—	—	—	—	o	1.92	Q
3	Maurice Fournier	France	—	—	o	—	o	1.92	Q
4	Julius Chigbolu	Nigeria	—	o	o	—	o	1.92	Q
4	Charles Dumas	United States	o	—	—	o	o	1.92	Q
4	Chilla Porter	Australia	o	—	—	o	o	1.92	Q
7	Patrick Etolu	Uganda	o	o	—	o	o	1.92	Q
7	Stig Pettersson	Sweden	—	o	o	o	o	1.92	Q
7	Phil Reavis	United States	o	—	o	o	o	1.92	Q
7	Peter Wells	Great Britain	o	—	o	o	o	1.92	Q
7	Vern Wilson	United States	o	—	o	o	o	1.92	Q
7	Yang Chuan-kwang	Republic of China	o	—	o	o	o	1.92	Q
13	Yukio Ishikawa	Japan	o	o	o	o	o	1.92	Q
13	Joseph Leresae	Kenya	o	o	o	o	o	1.92	Q
13	Ajit Singh Balla	India	o	o	o	o	o	1.92	Q
16	Colin Ridgway	Australia	o	—	xo	—	o	1.92	Q
17	Ken Money	Canada	xo	o	—	o	o	1.92	Q
18	José da Conceição	Brazil	o	xo	o	o	o	1.92	Q
19	Ernle Haisley	Jamaica	o	—	—	xxo	o	1.92	Q
20	Nagalingam Ethirveerasingam	Ceylon	o	—	o	o	xo	1.92	Q
21	Ciriaco Baronda	Philippines	o	o	o	o	xo	1.92	Q
22	Vincent Gabriel	Nigeria	o	—	—	xxo	xo	1.92	Q
23	Gianmario Roveraro	Italy	o	—	o	o	xxx	1.88	
24	John Vernon	Australia	o	o	o	DNF	—N/a	1.82	
24	Maridjo Wirjodemedjo	Indonesia	o	o	o	xxx	—N/a	1.82	
26	Bengt Nilsson	Sweden	xo	xo	xo	—	xxx	1.82	
27	I Gusti Putu Oka Mona	Indonesia	—	o	xxo	DNF	—N/a	1.82	
—	Vladimir Polyakov	Soviet Union	—	—	—	—	xxx	NM	
—	Víctor Carmona	Puerto Rico						DNS	
—	Brendan O'Reilly	Ireland						DNS	
—	Walter Herssens	Belgium						DNS	
—	Richard Estick	Jamaica						DNS	

=== Final ===
Rank	Athlete	Nation	1.80	1.86	1.92	1.96	2.00	2.03	2.06	2.08	2.10	2.12	2.14	Height	Notes
1st place, gold medalist(s)	Charles Dumas	United States	—	—	o	o	o	o	xo	o	xo	xxo	xx-	2.12	OR
2nd place, silver medalist(s)	Chilla Porter	Australia	—	o	o	o	o	o	o	xo	xxo	xxx	—N/a	2.10	
3rd place, bronze medalist(s)	Igor Kashkarov	Soviet Union	—	—	o	o	o	o	o	o	xxx	—N/a		2.08	
4	Stig Pettersson	Sweden	—	—	o	o	o	o	xxo	xxx	—N/a			2.06	
5	Ken Money	Canada	o	o	o	o	o	xo	xxx	—N/a				2.03	
6	Volodymyr Sitkin	Soviet Union	—	—	o	o	o	xxx	—N/a					2.00	
7	Phil Reavis	United States	—	o	o	o	o	xxx	—N/a					2.00	
7	Colin Ridgway	Australia	—	o	o	o	o	xxx	—N/a					2.00	
9	Julius Chigbolu	Nigeria	—	xo	xxo	xo	o	xxx	—N/a					2.00	
10	Vern Wilson	United States	—	o	o	o	xo	xxx	—N/a					2.00	
11	Maurice Fournier	France	—	—	o	o	xxx	—N/a						1.96	
12	Patrick Etolu	Uganda	—	o	o	o	xxx	—N/a						1.96	
12	Yukio Ishikawa	Japan	—	o	o	o	xxx	—N/a						1.96	
14	Ajit Singh Balla	India	o	o	o	o	xxx	—N/a						1.96	
15	Ernle Haisley	Jamaica	o	o	o	xo	xxx	—N/a						1.96	
16	Peter Wells	Great Britain	o	o	xo	xo	xxx	—N/a						1.96	
17	Ciriaco Baronda	Philippines	—	o	xo	xxx	—N/a							1.92	
18	Joseph Leresae	Kenya	o	o	xo	xxx	—N/a							1.92	
19	Vincent Gabriel	Nigeria	o	o	xxo	xxx	—N/a							1.92	
20	Yang Chuan-kwang	Republic of China	—	o	xxx	—N/a								1.86	
21	José da Conceição	Brazil	o	o	xxx	—N/a								1.86	
21	Nagalingam Ethirveerasingam	Ceylon	o	o	xxx	—N/a								1.86	
