= Vladimir Polyakov =

Vladimir Polyakov may refer to:

- Vladimir Polyakov (entrepreneur) (born 1953), Russian entrepreneur
- Vladimir Polyakov (high jumper) (born 1935), Soviet athlete
- Vladimir Polyakov (pole vaulter) (born 1960), Soviet athlete
- Vladimir Polyakov (rower) (born 1952), Soviet rower
- Vladimir Polyakov (diplomat), Soviet Ambassador to Egypt 1974–1981
