= 2008 Murdoch state by-election =

By-election in Australia

The 2008 Murdoch state by-election was a by-election held on 23 February 2008 for the Western Australian Legislative Assembly seat of Murdoch in the southern suburbs of Perth.

The by-election was triggered by the death of Liberal member Trevor Sprigg on 17 January 2008. Sprigg had held the seat since the 2005 state election. A former football star with East Fremantle Football Club, he was a popular local member, and served in Parliament as the Opposition Whip in the Legislative Assembly. On 17 January 2008, while returning from the Gold Coast to attend a Liberal leadership vote, Sprigg died of a heart attack aged 61. The leadership vote produced a victory for Troy Buswell, and members were to learn of Sprigg's death only after the vote had been taken.

On 24 January 2008, the Speaker of the Western Australian Legislative Assembly issued a writ directing the Electoral Commissioner to proceed with an election in the district. Christian Porter, a 37-year-old law lecturer at the University of Western Australia, won the Liberal preselection ballot on 30 January 2007 against former minister and member for neighbouring Riverton, Graham Kierath.

The seat of Murdoch, first established in 1976, was considered to be a safe seat for the Liberal Party, with just two other members since its creation—former Leader of the Opposition Barry MacKinnon, and Mike Board. Commentators viewed the by-election as a non-event, and it became clear early that the Labor Party, in government in Western Australia since 2001, had no intention of contesting the seat, and that the media's main interest in the race was to debate Porter's role in a future shadow cabinet. Porter went on to win the seat against three non-major-party candidates.

== Timeline ==
Date	Event
17 January 2008	Trevor Sprigg died, vacating the seat of Murdoch.
24 January 2008	Writs were issued by the Speaker of the Legislative Assembly to proceed with a by-election.
1 February 2008	Close of nominations and draw of ballot papers.
23 February 2008	Polling day, between the hours of 8am and 6pm.
23 April 2008	The writ was returned and the results formally declared.

== Candidates ==
The by-election attracted four candidates. Christian Porter, a 37-year-old law lecturer at the University of Western Australia, grandson of former Queensland Liberal MLA Charles Porter who held the seat of Toowong from 1966 until 1980 and son of former Western Australian state director Chilla Porter, won the Liberal preselection ballot against former minister and member for neighbouring Riverton, Graham Kierath. He was tipped, if successful, to become the shadow attorney-general, a role which had been vacant following the departure of Sue Walker (Nedlands) from the Liberal party.

Other candidates ran for the Greens, One Nation and Christian Democratic Party:

- Hsien Harper (Greens), an organiser for the Australian Services Union who previously ran for Willagee in 2005;
- Neil Gilmour (One Nation), the party's state president who ran for Division of Curtin in 2001 and the South Metropolitan Legislative Council region in 2005;
- Ka-ren Chew (CDP), a local solicitor who ran for Division of Tangney, which includes Murdoch and Riverton, in the 2007 federal election.

== Results ==
As largely predicted, Christian Porter retained the seat for the Liberal Party. As the Labor Party did not run, a swing could not be determined, although the 10-15% increase in the Liberal vote due to Labor voters (35.51% at the 2005 election) choosing the Liberals ahead of the Greens was hailed by Porter in his victory speech at 7:40pm AWDT on election night.

Murdoch by-election, 2008
Party	Candidate	Votes	%	±%
Liberal	Christian Porter	13,121	62.82	+14.43
Greens	Hsien Harper	5,502	26.34	+19.01
Christian Democrats	Ka-ren Chew	1,604	7.68	+4.33
One Nation	Neil Gilmour	659	3.16	+2.19
Total formal votes		20,886	96.78	+1.42
Informal votes		696	3.22	−1.42
Turnout		21,582	74.72	−17.12
Two-candidate-preferred result
Liberal	Christian Porter	14,488	69.39	+13.48
Greens	Hsien Harper	6,392	30.61	+30.61
Liberal hold		Swing	N/A	
