= Ernle Haisley =

Jamaican high jumper (born 1936)

Personal information
- Nationality: Jamaican
- Born: 20 June 1936 (age 90) Saint Catherine, Jamaica
- Height: 1.80 m (5 ft 11 in)
- Weight: 68 kg (150 lb)

Sport
- Sport: Athletics
- Event: High jump
Medal record
Men's athletics
Representing British West Indies
Pan American Games
Bronze medal – third place	1959 Chicago	High jump
Representing Jamaica
British Empire and Commonwealth Games
Gold medal – first place	1958 Cardiff	High jump
Central American and Caribbean Games
Bronze medal – third place	1962 Kingston	High jump

Ernle Leighton Haisley (born 20 June 1936) is a Jamaican former high jumper who competed in the 1956 Summer Olympics.

== Biography ==
In 1956, Haisley took part in the 1956 Summer Olympics in Melbourne. He reached a height of 1.96 metres in the final, placing him 15th.

Haisley finished second behind Patrick Etolu in the high jump event at the 1958 AAA Championships and shortly afterwards Haisley represented Jamaica at the 1958 British Empire and Commonwealth Games winning gold in the high jump with a height of 6 ft 9 in (2.06 m). This remained the Commonwealth Games high jump record until 1962.

In the following year, he represented British West Indies at the 1959 Pan American Games, winning bronze with a height of 2.00 metres. His final success in major competition was at the Athletics at the 1962 Central American and Caribbean Games in Kingston, Jamaica, where he won bronze with a height of 1.94 metres.

== International competitions ==
Year	Competition	Venue	Position	Event	Notes
Representing Jamaica
1956	Olympic Games	Melbourne, Australia	15th	High jump	1.96 m
1957	British West Indies Championships	Kingston, Jamaica	1st	High jump	2.04 m
1957	British West Indies Championships	Kingston, Jamaica	1st	Pole vault	3.35 m
1958	British Empire and Commonwealth Games	Cardiff, United Kingdom	1st	High jump	2.06 m
1959	Pan American Games^{1}	Chicago, United States	3rd	High jump	2.01 m
1960	British West Indies Championships	Kingston, Jamaica	1st	High jump	2.02 m
1962	Central American and Caribbean Games	Kingston, Jamaica	3rd	High jump	1.94 m

^{1}Representing the British West Indies
