= Athletics at the 1955 Summer International University Sports Week – Men's high jump =

The men's high jump event at the 1955 International University Sports Week was held in San Sebastián on 12 August 1955.

== Results ==
Rank	Name	Nationality	Result	Notes
1st place, gold medalist(s)	Mario Roveraro	Italy	1.90	
2nd place, silver medalist(s)	Yukio Ishikawa	Japan	1.85	
3rd place, bronze medalist(s)	Juan Ignacio Ariño	Spain	1.80	
4	Gert Thues	Belgium	1.75	
5	Alejandro Conti	Spain	1.75	
6	Fonseca	Brazil	1.75	
7	Kwang-ho	South Korea	1.75	
8	Desmond Luke	Sierra Leone	1.75	
9	Atef Ismaïl	Egypt	1.70	
