= Kevin Phillips (high jumper) =

Welsh athlete

Personal information
- Nationality: British (Welsh)
- Born: Wales

Sport
- Sport: Athletics
- Event: High jump
- Club: Swansea Athletics Club

Kevin M. Phillips is a former track and field athlete from Wales, who competed at the 1958 British Empire and Commonwealth Games (now Commonwealth Games).

== Biography ==
Phillips was a member of the Swansea Athletics Club and in June 1958 represented South Wales against North Wales in a warm up event before the Empire Games, winning the high jump event. He also finished runner-up behind Terry Morgan in the high jump event at the 1958 AAA Welsh championships.

He represented the 1958 Welsh team at the 1958 British Empire and Commonwealth Games in Cardiff, Wales, where he participated in one event; the high jump event.

He was the Welsh high jump champion in 1954 and 1956 and was coached by P. M. Williams.
