= Athletics at the 1954 British Empire and Commonwealth Games – Men's high jump =

Men's high jump at the Commonwealth Games
- Venue: Empire Stadium
- Dates: 1 August

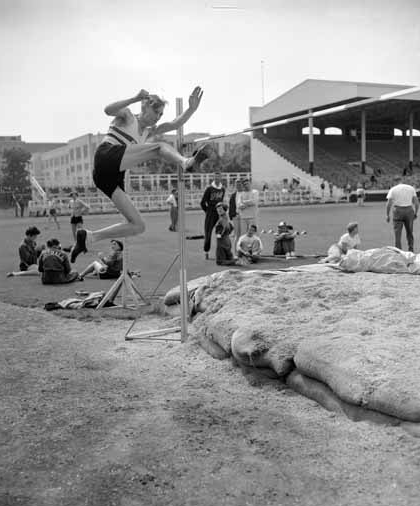
Peter Wells of New Zealand in the high jump event. Attribution:Province newspaper

The men's high jump event at the 1954 British Empire and Commonwealth Games was held on 1 August at the Empire Stadium in Vancouver, Canada.

A new Commonwealth record was established by Emmanuel Ifeajuna of Nigeria, who became the first Commonwealth athlete to clear six feet and eight inches. Ifeajuna was also the first black African to win a gold medal at the Commonwealth Games.

== Results ==
Rank	Name	Nationality	Result	Notes
1st place, gold medalist(s)	Emmanuel Ifeajuna	Nigeria	6 ft 8 in (2.03 m)	GR
2nd place, silver medalist(s)	Patrick Etolu	Uganda	6 ft 6 1/4 in (1.99 m)	
3rd place, bronze medalist(s)	Nafiu Osagie	Nigeria	6 ft 6 1/4 in (1.99 m)	
4	Peter Wells	New Zealand	6 ft 5 in (1.96 m)	
5	Douglas Stuart	Australia	6 ft 4 in (1.93 m)	
6	John Vernon	Australia	6 ft 4 in (1.93 m)	
7	Derek Cox	England	6 ft 2 in (1.88 m)	
8	Kiprono Maritim	Kenya	6 ft 2 in (1.88 m)	
9	Murray Jeffries	New Zealand	6 ft 2 in (1.88 m)	
10	Jonathan Lenemiria	Kenya	6 ft 0 in (1.83 m)	
11	Ajit Singh Balla	India	6 ft 0 in (1.83 m)	
12	Kevin McMahon	Australia	6 ft 0 in (1.83 m)	
13	David Blair	Canada	6 ft 0 in (1.83 m)	
14	Bob Adams	Canada	6 ft 0 in (1.83 m)	
15	Ian Hume	Canada	5 ft 10 in (1.78 m)	
16	Victor Cassis	Canada	5 ft 10 in (1.78 m)	
