= Joseph Leresae =

Kenyan athlete

Personal information
- Nationality: Kenyan

Sport
- Sport: Athletics
- Event: high jump

Stephane Joseph Leresae (born 1937) is a Kenyan retired high jumper, who competed at the Olympics and Commonwealth Games.

== Biography ==
Leresae is from Maralal. He went to Narok Primary School, where his teacher William ole Ntimama (who later became a prominent politician) spotted his jumping talent.

Leresae competed at the 1956 Summer Olympics, finishing 18th in the high jump.

In 1958 he was third behind Patrick Etolu at the British 1958 AAA Championships and finished fourth at the 1958 Commonwealth Games. He missed the 1960 Summer Olympics as he was committed to his work at East African Railways.

He is an East and Central African champion from 1961 and finished fifth at the 1962 Commonwealth Games, although his performance was hindered by the fact that he lost a spike from his shoe and was unable to get a replacement.

He once held the British Empire high jump record of 6 feet, 8 inches.

Leresae was a Maasai herdsman.

Until her death, he was married to Anne Gathoni and had 12 children.
