= Vladimir Polyakov (entrepreneur) =

Russian entrepreneur (born 1953)

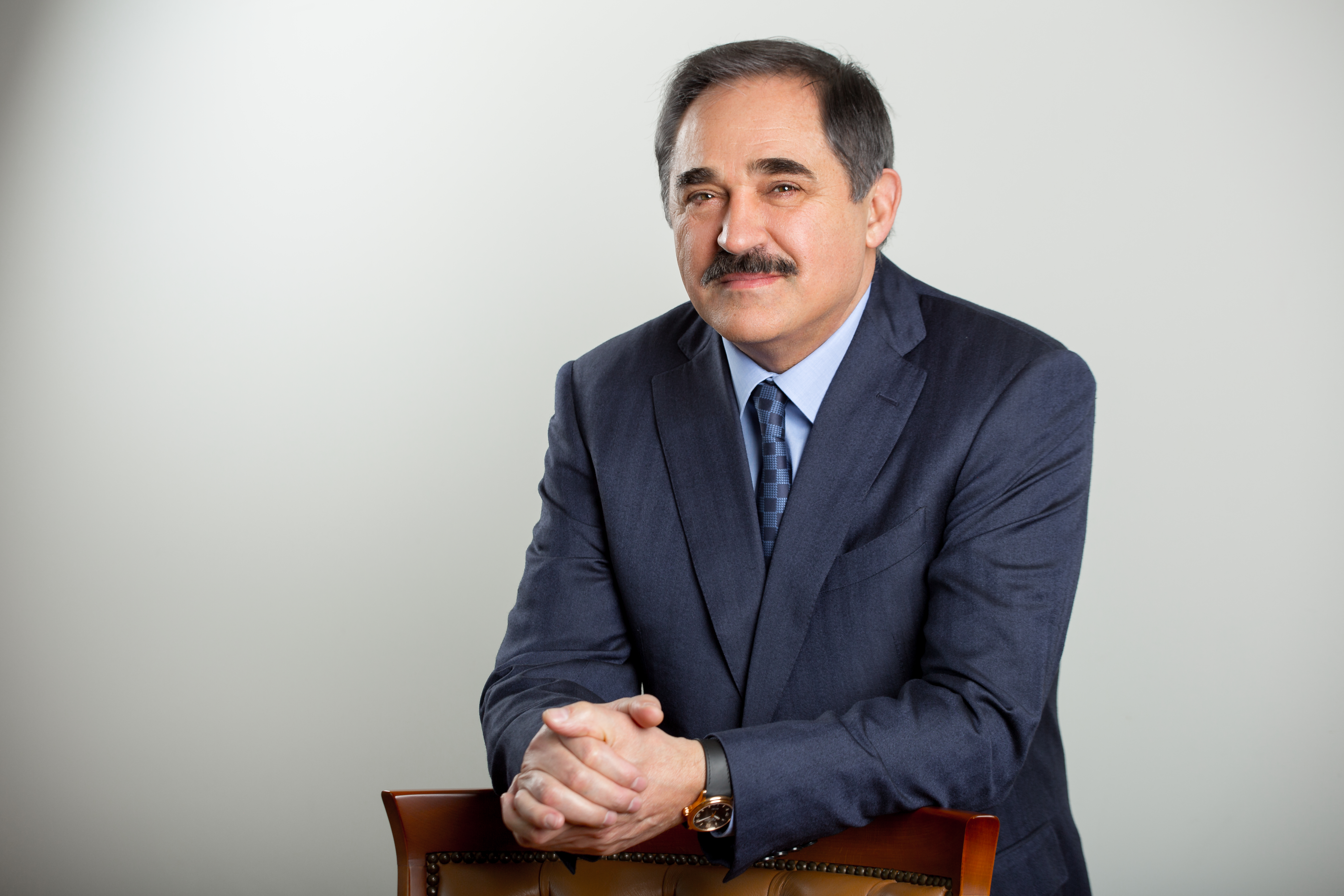
- Born: Vladimir Ivanovich Polyakov; 28 October 1953 (age 72); Novoe, Khabarovsk Krai, RSFSR, Soviet Union
- Education: Tomsk State University of Control Systems and Radio-electronics
- Occupations: Investor and philanthropist
- Known for: Founder and president of JSC Concern Energomera and founder and chairman of the Board of directors of JSC Monocrystal
- Awards: Order of Honour (Russia)

Vladimir Polyakov (Russian: Владимир Иванович Поляков, born October 28, 1953, Novoe, Khabarovsk Krai, Russian SFSR) is a Russian entrepreneur. According to Forbes magazine, in 2015, he held the 192nd position in Russia's wealthiest people ranking.

Polyakov is a founder and president of JSC Concern Energomera, founder and chairman of the Board of directors of JSC Monocrystal, member of the board of trustees at the Tomsk State University of Control Systems and Radio-electronics, and professor emeritus at the North-Caucasus Federal University.

== Early years and education ==
Vladimir Polyakov was born in 1953 in Novy, Khabarovski Krai, Russia. His father, Ivan Grigorievich Polyakov, worked as a machine operator in a geosurvey expedition. The family moved a lot, participated in the Virgin Lands Campaign in Kazakhstan and in the Russian Far East. Vladimir has been passionate about radio devices since his childhood. He assembled his first radio receiver in the fifth grade.

In 1977, Vladimir Polyakov graduated from the Tomsk State University of Control Systems and Radioelectronics.

== Career ==
In 1976, he got employed by the Gomel Radio Plant as a supervisor, later he worked as a section manager, machine workshop chief, and deputy chief engineer. In those years, the plant produced radars for the USSR's antimissile defense. In 1989, he was transferred to the Stavropol Radio Plant Signal as a chief engineer.

In 1994, Vladimir Polyakov established a new company, JSC Concern Energomera, a commercial enterprise promoting electronic energy meters on the domestic market. In 1996, Concern Energomera purchased a controlling interest of Nevinnomyssk Measuring Equipment Plant Kvant.

In 1999, on the base of Stavropol Plant Analog, Vladimir Polyakov established JSC Monocrystal, the enterprise engaged in the growth and processing of synthetic sapphire.

The growth of global demand for sapphire turned Monocrystal into the world's largest manufacturer of synthetic sapphire, and in 2011, Vladimir Polyakov was included in the Forbes list of the wealthiest people in Russia (the 143rd position).

Nowadays Polyakov's Concern Energomera consists of seven plants in Russia, Ukraine, Belarus, and China, two design institutes, and foreign representative offices in Taiwan, South Korea, the Netherlands, and the United States.

== Public activity ==
Vladimir Polyakov is a professor emeritus at the North-Caucasus Federal University, as well as a member of the board of trustees at the Tomsk State University of Control Systems and Radio-electronics.

== Awards ==
In 2004, by a decree of the President of Russia, Vladimir Polyakov was awarded the Order of Honor for his contribution to the social and economic development of Stavropol Krai. In 2006, he was awarded the “Hero of Labor of Stavropol Krai” gold medal for innovations and advances in the development of industrial manufacturing.

For his personal contribution to the revival of Orthodox churches he was honored with three Orders by the Russian Orthodox Church — the Order of Holy Prince Daniel of Moscow, the Order of St. Sergius of Radonezh, and the Order of St. Seraphim of Sarov.
