= Ciriaco Baronda =

Filipino high jumper (born 1934)

Personal information
- Nationality: Filipino
- Born: April 3, 1934 (age 92)

Sport
- Sport: Athletics
- Event: High jump

Ciriaco Baronda (born April 3, 1934) is a Filipino athlete. He competed in the men's high jump at the 1956 Summer Olympics.
