= Terry Morgan (high jumper) =

Welsh athlete

Personal information
- Nationality: British (Welsh)

Sport
- Sport: Athletics
- Event: High jump / Decathlon
- Club: Newport Athletics Club; Royal Air Force

Terence Morgan is a former track and field athlete from Wales, who competed at the 1958 British Empire and Commonwealth Games (now Commonwealth Games).

== Biography ==
Morgan was a member of the Newport Athletics Club and represented the Royal Air Force athletics team. Morgan defeated Kevin Phillips to win the high jump title at the 1958 AAA Welsh championships.

He represented the 1958 Welsh team at the 1958 British Empire and Commonwealth Games in Cardiff, Wales, where he participated in one event; the high jump event.

Morgan also competed in decathlon and finished third at the 1958 Wlesh championships. He was the Monmouthshire champion in high jump, long jump, discus and javelin.
