= Volodymyr Sitkin =

Ukrainian high jumper (1934–2019)

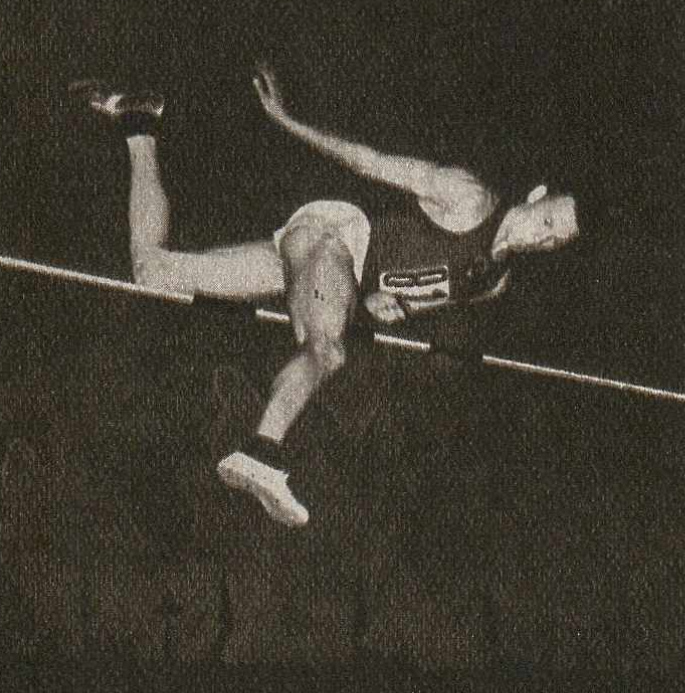
- International Athletics Championships 1957

Personal information
- Nationality: Ukrainian
- Born: 6 December 1934
- Died: 17 January 2019 (aged 84)

Sport
- Sport: Athletics
- Event: High jump

Volodymyr Sitkin (Ukrainian: Володимир Сіткін; 6 December 1934 – 17 January 2019) was a Ukrainian athlete. He competed in the men's high jump at the 1956 Summer Olympics, representing the Soviet Union.
