= Maridjo Wirjodemedjo =

Personal information
- Nationality: Indonesian
- Born: 20 December 1927

Sport
- Sport: Athletics
- Event: High jump

Maridjo Wirjodemedjo (born 20 December 1927) was an Indonesian athlete. He competed in the men's high jump at the 1956 Summer Olympics.
