= Julius Chigbolu =

Nigerian high jumper

Personal information
- Nationality: Nigerian
- Born: 19 February 1929
- Died: 18 April 2010 (aged 81)

Sport
- Sport: Athletics
- Event: High jump

Julius Obiefuna Chigbolu (19 February 1929 – 18 April 2010) was a Nigerian athlete. He competed in the men's high jump at the 1956 Summer Olympics. He is the grandfather of Italian 400 m athlete Maria Benedicta Chigbolu.
