= Vern Wilson (high jumper) =

American high jumper (1931–2016)

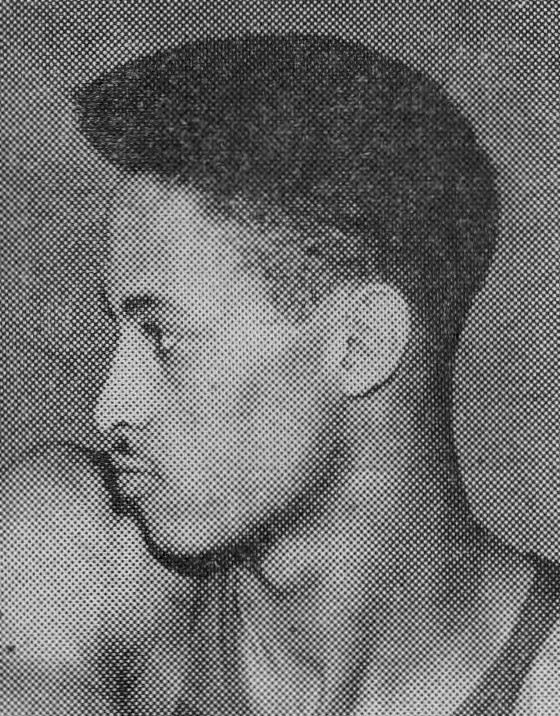
- Wilson in 1954

Personal information
- Born: January 19, 1931 Oklahoma, U.S.
- Died: April 29, 2016 (aged 85) San Jose, California, U.S.

Sport
- Sport: Athletics
- Event: High jump

Vernon Troylee Wilson (January 19, 1931 – April 20, 2016) was an American athlete. He competed in the men's high jump at the 1956 Summer Olympics.
