= Christian Porter =

Australian politician (born 1970)

The Honourable Christian Porter
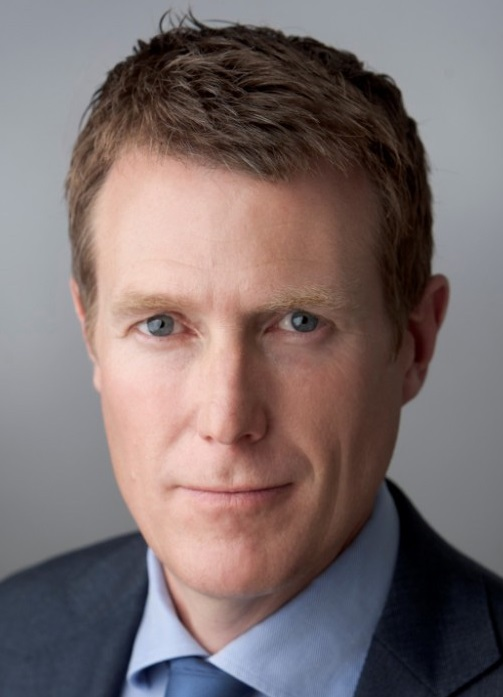
- Official portrait, 2015

Attorney-General of Australia
- In office 20 December 2017 – 30 March 2021
- Prime Minister: Malcolm Turnbull; Scott Morrison
- Preceded by: George Brandis
- Succeeded by: Michaelia Cash

Minister for Industry, Science and Technology
- In office 30 March 2021 – 19 September 2021 Serving with Scott Morrison
- Prime Minister: Scott Morrison
- Preceded by: Karen Andrews
- Succeeded by: Melissa Price (Science and Technology); Angus Taylor (Industry)

Leader of the House
- In office 26 May 2019 – 30 March 2021
- Prime Minister: Scott Morrison
- Deputy: Darren Chester
- Preceded by: Christopher Pyne
- Succeeded by: Peter Dutton

Minister for Industrial Relations
- In office 29 May 2019 – 30 March 2021
- Prime Minister: Scott Morrison
- Preceded by: Kelly O'Dwyer
- Succeeded by: Michaelia Cash

Minister for Social Services
- In office 21 September 2015 – 20 December 2017
- Prime Minister: Malcolm Turnbull
- Preceded by: Scott Morrison
- Succeeded by: Dan Tehan

Member of the Australian Parliament for Pearce
- In office 7 September 2013 – 11 April 2022
- Preceded by: Judi Moylan
- Succeeded by: Tracey Roberts
Parliament of Western Australia
Treasurer of Western Australia
In office 14 December 2010 – 12 June 2012
Premier	Colin Barnett
Preceded by	Colin Barnett
Succeeded by	Colin Barnett
Attorney-General of Western Australia
In office 23 September 2008 – 12 June 2012
Premier	Colin Barnett
Preceded by	Jim McGinty
Succeeded by	Michael Mischin
Minister for Corrective Services
In office 23 September 2008 – 14 December 2010
Premier	Colin Barnett
Preceded by	Margaret Quirk
Succeeded by	Terry Redman
Member of the Western Australian Legislative Assembly for Bateman
In office 6 September 2008 – 9 March 2013
Preceded by	District created
Succeeded by	Matt Taylor

Personal details
- Born: Charles Christian Porter; 11 July 1970 (age 56) Perth, Western Australia, Australia
- Party: Liberal
- Spouses: Lucy Gunn (divorced); Jennifer Negus (m. 2008; sep. 2020) Karen Espiner (m. 2022)
- Children: 2
- Parent: Chilla Porter (father)
- Relatives: Charles Robert Porter (grandfather)
- Education: Hale School; University of Western Australia (BEc, BA (Hons), LLB); London School of Economics (MSc)
- Profession: Politician, lawyer

Charles Christian Porter (born 11 July 1970) is an Australian former politician and lawyer who served as the 37th Attorney-General of Australia from 2017 to 2021 in the Turnbull government and the subsequent Morrison government. He was a Member of Parliament (MP) for the Division of Pearce from 2013 to 2022 and a member of the Liberal Party of Australia. Porter also served as Leader of the House and Minister for Industrial Relations from 2019 to 2021, and Minister for Industry, Science and Technology in 2021 following his resignation as attorney-general.

From Perth, Porter attended Hale School, the University of Western Australia and later the London School of Economics, and practised law at Clayton Utz and taught law at the University of Western Australia before his election to parliament. He is the son of the 1956 Olympic silver medallist, Charles "Chilla" Porter and the grandson of Queensland Liberal politician, Charles Porter, who was a member of the Queensland Legislative Assembly from 1966 to 1980.

Before his election to the federal House of Representatives, Porter had served in the Parliament of Western Australia. He first entered the Legislative Assembly after winning the seat of Murdoch in a 2008 by-election following the death of the sitting member, Trevor Sprigg, and he was subsequently elected to the new seat of Bateman at the 2008 general election. After the Liberals formed government, Porter was appointed Attorney-General in the Barnett Ministry. In December 2010, he was also appointed Treasurer and held both portfolios until June 2012, when he resigned from the ministry to contest the 2013 federal election.

Porter was Parliamentary Secretary to the Prime Minister in the Abbott government from December 2014 to September 2015, and then Minister for Social Services in the Turnbull government from September 2015 to December 2017. In March 2021 a historical rape allegation against Porter became public in the midst of the 2021 Australian Parliament House sexual misconduct allegations. Porter denied the claim and launched a defamation case against the ABC. The case was later dropped, with the ABC agreeing to pay all of Porter's mediation costs and appending an editor's note to the original article. Porter resigned from the front bench in September 2021, after media reports revealed that he was a beneficiary of a blind trust relating to his legal action against the ABC. Following much controversy and media scrutiny, in December of that year, Porter announced his retirement from politics.

== Background and early career ==
Porter's father was Charles "Chilla" Porter, who won the men's high jump silver medal at the 1956 Summer Olympics and was director of Western Australia's Liberal Party during the 1970s and 1980s. Chilla's father, Charles Robert Porter, was a Queensland Liberal state MP between 1966 and 1980 and served in the ministry of Joh Bjelke-Petersen.

Porter was educated at Hale School, and was selected for Australia's national schools debating team. From 1988 he attended the University of Western Australia where he graduated Bachelor of Economics and Bachelor of Arts with first-class honours in politics, before completing a Bachelor of Laws degree. Porter later studied at the London School of Economics for a Master of Science in political theory, from which he graduated with distinction at the top of his class.

Prior to entering Parliament, Porter worked predominantly as a lawyer, starting as a commercial litigator at Clayton Utz before moving to public practice. He spent a year as an advisor to the Federal Minister for Justice and then began working for the Office of the Director of Public Prosecutions as a senior state prosecutor. Before his election in 2008, Porter was working as a lecturer at Curtin University and the University of Western Australia as well as retaining, part-time, his position as senior prosecutor at the DPP.

== State politics ==
Porter was first elected to the Parliament of Western Australia in the now defunct seat of Murdoch in the February 2008 by-election following the death of the standing member Trevor Sprigg.

At the September 2008 election, Porter contested and won the newly created seat of Bateman following the abolition of the seat of Murdoch in the 2007 redistribution. He was appointed Attorney-General and Minister for Corrective Services after the election, having held the equivalent shadow portfolios prior to the election.

In 2009, Porter proposed Western Australia follow the other states by introducing legislation that would prevent members of outlaw motorcycle gangs associating with each other.

On 14 December 2010, Porter was sworn in as Treasurer of Western Australia. He retained the portfolio of Attorney-General, while the Corrective Services portfolio was transferred to Terry Redman.

In 2011, Porter fought against a court decision to award a sexual assault victim compensation of A$40,000 as she was smoking amphetamines with her attacker when the offences occurred. Following a decision by a district court judge, Porter took the matter to the Supreme Court where the judge granted his application to go the Court of Appeal. The court agreed with Porter and quashed the payout in 2012.

Porter oversaw the planned introduction of the harshest organised crime laws in Australia in 2011 which would see stronger penalties for organised crime gang members, particularly outlaw motorcycle gangs, for all manner of crimes including associating with one another. The bill that Porter planned to introduce, the Criminal Organisation Control Bill 2011, would see outlaw motorcycle gangs defined as Declared Criminal Organisations. The Australian Lawyers Alliance described the proposal as "a desperate attempt at popularity" by the state government. The laws were first read in the Legislative Assembly in November 2011 and debated multiple times until March 2012 when it passed onto the Legislative Council. The bill was then passed in November 2012.

On 12 June 2012, he announced he was stepping down from his ministerial portfolios to contest the seat of Pearce at the 2013 Australian federal election.

== Federal politics ==
At the 2013 election, Porter was elected to federal parliament with an 8% margin. He became parliamentary secretary to the Prime Minister on 23 December 2014 and held that position until 21 September 2015. He was a part of the speaker's panel from 18 November 2013 to 9 February 2015.

Porter is a member of the National Right faction of the Liberal Party.

Prior to 2021, Porter had been considered a potential future prime minister; in 2017 bookmakers installed Porter as a $5 chance to become the next prime minister from Western Australia (third-favourite behind Julie Bishop and Tim Hammond).

=== Minister for Social Services (2015–2017) ===
On 20 September 2015, Prime Minister Malcolm Turnbull announced that Porter would replace Scott Morrison as Social Services Minister as part of a Cabinet overhaul.

In 2016, Centrelink, operating under Porter's senior oversight as Social Services Minister, became involved in the Robodebt recovery controversy. Despite heightened media interest and complaints, after meeting with the Department of Human Services, Porter stated that the program was working "incredibly well". The program was later subject to two Senate committee inquiries, and several calls for a Royal Commission into the program, to understand its failures, and deliver justice to its victims.

In May 2020, Porter (now in the position of Attorney-General rather than Social Services Minister) conceded that the Robodebt recovery scheme had "no legal basis" and was "unlawful" but refused to apologise for it.

One of Porter's roles was to manage the Cashless Welfare Card, and increased its use in various communities. He spoke of his pride in the outcomes of the policy. However, the card has been linked to increased hardship for many of its users and its efficacy has been heavily disputed. The trial was extended into Ceduna and the East Kimberley region of Western Australia in 2017 following an independent evaluation conducted by ORIMA Research who concluded that the trial had been successful "in reducing alcohol consumption, illegal drug use and gambling" and it had established a "a clear ‘proof-of-concept’".

During his time in this ministry, Porter was instrumental in the formation of the Coalition policy of performing drug tests on welfare recipients, which was criticised by experts, since there was no evidence anywhere in the world of a similar project working. ABC fact checkers called the policy "wishful thinking" that it would help people get off welfare. This section of the legislation was eventually dropped to allow the passage of the remaining elements of the bill, which contained large budget cuts to the welfare system.

Porter was criticised for skipping the final sittings of the Royal Commission into Institutional Responses to Child Sexual Abuse in order to attend a cricket match with John Howard.

=== Attorney-General (2017–2021) ===
In a December 2017 reshuffle of the Turnbull ministry, Porter became Attorney-General in place of George Brandis. He relinquished the social services portfolio to Dan Tehan.

After the reshuffle, some of the national security powers and responsibilities previously held by the Attorney-General were transferred to the new position of Minister for Home Affairs, which was given to Peter Dutton. This was seen as a positive by many in the legal community who said that the role of Attorney-General had become too focused on security and that the role should be realigned to its old purpose of defending the rule of law. It was also suggested that many areas of the law were in crisis because of the security focus, such as family law and incarceration levels of Indigenous Australians.

At the commencement of his role as Attorney-General, Porter called on religious institutions to implement the recommendations of the Royal Commission into Institutional Responses to Child Sexual Abuse.

Following the raids on the journalists of the ABC and Newscorp, Porter would not rule out prosecuting journalists for publishing public interest stories, although he said he would be "seriously disinclined" to go ahead with a prosecution. In the case of Newscorp journalist Annika Smethurst, Porter asked the court not to destroy the evidence collected from the raid on her house, so that it could be used in a future court case. Porter and the Federal Police said the restrictive privacy when it comes to security matters, "may justify very large incursions on the freedom" of individuals.

In November 2019, Porter as Attorney-General extended the religious freedom bill from faith-based schools and organisations to religious hospitals and aged-care providers. The bill states that the aforementioned institutions would have legal protection to employ staff according to their religious beliefs.

Other actions he has taken in his role have included calling on social media platforms to be seen as publishers, attempts to block environmental groups from calling on boycotts of companies connected to the coal industry, repealing the medevac laws, restricting union activity, and attempting to have GetUp! registered as an arm of the Labor party.

During the COVID-19 pandemic, Porter worked with Sally McManus of the ACTU to develop amendments to the Fair Work Act. Porter hailed the negotiations as a success, with McManus stating that; "We had been concerned that several employer groups had been advocating for a widespread removal of workers' rights akin to WorkChoices".

In December 2020, Porter introduced a bill to merge the Family Court of Australia with the Federal Circuit Court of Australia, citing administrative efficiencies.

=== Minister for Industry, Science and Technology (March – September 2021) ===
In March 2021, following the allegations against Porter, the cabinet was shuffled and he was moved to the position of Minister for Industry, Science and Technology. Scott Morrison said this was a compromise due to advice from the solicitor-general regarding whether Porter could remain Attorney General while taking legal action against the ABC. Porter resigned from cabinet on 19 September 2021 after concerns that he had accepted anonymous donations via a blind trust to cover his legal expenses.

=== Retirement ===
Porter denied his imminent retirement in November 2021, but then announced in a press release on 1 December 2021 that he would not contest the 2022 federal election and would instead retire from politics, opting to spend more time with his family.

== Post-political career ==
In February 2022, Porter announced that he would be returning to the legal profession and hinted that he will be writing a book after he left Parliament. He also set up a trust to operate two companies he has formed. The companies, Henley Stirling Lawyers Pty Ltd and Henley Stirling Consultants Pty Ltd, have Porter listed as the sole director.

In July 2022 Porter was acting for underworld figure Mick Gatto in a defamation case against the Australian Broadcasting Corporation. In the same month Porter lost his own appeal in the Federal Court where the court decided that Sue Chrysanthou would not be able to act for Porter in his own defamation case against the ABC. Porter and Chrysanthou were ordered to pay A$430,200 in costs.

On 28 March 2023, Porter was engaged by Zeph Investments, Clive Palmer's Singapore-based company, to represent them in a lawsuit against the Commonwealth of Australia for AUD$296 billion over the alleged loss of contractual entitlement, "moral damages" and "sovereign risk", in relation to an iron ore project for which Palmer's company, Mineralogy, had already lost a lawsuit.

== Personal life ==
Porter was listed as a contender for Cleo magazine's eligible bachelor of the year in 1999.

He has described himself as "not particularly religious".

In the mid-2000s, Porter married Lucy Gunn, but they divorced. In 2008, Porter married Jennifer Negus, a former colleague and a granddaughter of former independent senator Syd Negus. He took paternity leave after his wife gave birth to their first child the day after being sworn in as the social services minister. They later had a second child, but announced their separation in January 2020. Porter got engaged to lawyer Karen Espiner in 2022. Porter and Espineer married over the 2022-2023 summer at Byron Bay.

In November 2020, it was alleged on Four Corners that, although married, Porter had kissed and cuddled a colleague's political staffer in a public setting. Porter denied the allegation and said that the staffer in question had also denied to Four Corners that the event occurred, but that the denial was not mentioned in the report. He again denied the allegation on the Perth radio station 6PR.

In the program, former prime minister Malcolm Turnbull stated that Porter's alleged behaviour had caused concern in the party room, although that was disputed by Porter. Not long after he said he had raised the alleged incident with Porter, Turnbull promoted Porter to the position of attorney-general. Porter attributed the criticisms made by Turnbull to a falling-out between the two men during the 2018 Liberal Party of Australia leadership spills, the event which ended Turnbull's prime ministership.

=== Rape allegation ===
In late February 2021, Australian media reported an alleged rape of a 16-year-old girl in 1988. It was alleged that the male offender was now (as of 2021) a federal cabinet minister. She had written a long statement for her solicitor in 2019, and had contacted several politicians and police. She died by suicide in 2020 and her statement was sent anonymously in February 2021 to the prime minister and several other members of parliament. On 2 March 2021, the police announced there was "insufficient admissible evidence" to secure a prosecution. Porter announced on 3 March 2021 that he was the person named in the allegations. He confirmed he met the woman in Sydney when he was 17, but denied the accusation and any sexual contact with her. He also announced he would take immediate leave to look after his mental health following the accusations.

On 15 March 2021, Porter launched a defamation claim against the ABC and reporter Louise Milligan, for publishing the allegation. His claim argued that although the original allegation did not name him, he was "readily identifiable" and that the article was intended to harm him. Porter withdrew the defamation claim on 31 May 2021, with the ABC paying the costs of mediation and appending an editor's note to the original article stating that "The ABC did not contend that the serious accusations could be substantiated to the applicable legal standard". No findings were made and no damages were awarded to Porter. On 10 June 2021, a friend of the alleged victim, film producer Jo Dyer, was awarded costs, estimated to be A$550,000, after she brought separate litigation to prevent one of Porter's defamation lawyers from representing him owing to having conflicting interests and access to confidential information about the victim and Porter.

On 24 June 2021, the original dossier detailing the rape allegation against Porter was made publicly available by the Federal Court of Australia.

In September 2021, Porter revealed to Federal Parliament in an interest declaration that the defamation case was funded in part by an anonymous donor, though he did not indicate the value of the donation nor his overall legal fees. A donation was made through a blind trust called the Legal Services Trust and Porter claimed "as a potential beneficiary I have no access to information about the conduct and funding of the trust". Porter's receipt of this donation was criticised by the opposition saying that he should not have accepted an anonymous donation and that it is in the public interest to know who made this donation. Porter also received criticism from Malcolm Turnbull, who described the situation as if Porter had said "my legal fees were paid by a guy in a mask who dropped off a chaff bag full of cash". The declaration also stated that his barrister, Sue Chrysanthou, discounted her typical fees to represent him in the case. Porter tendered his resignation from the frontbench on 19 September 2021.

On 20 October 2021, the Coalition government blocked a bid from the Australian Labor Party opposition to have Porter investigated by the House privileges committee over whether he had breached parliamentary rules over his financial disclosures, despite Speaker Tony Smith having ruled that there was a prima facie case for further scrutiny. The move from the government attracted significant criticism in the media. In November 2021, a parliamentary committee announced they would ask Porter to declare the ultimate source of funds.

Parliament of Western Australia
Preceded by Trevor Sprigg	Member for Murdoch; 2008	District abolished
District established	Member for Bateman; 2008–2013	Succeeded by Matt Taylor
Political offices
Preceded by Jim McGinty	Attorney-General of Western Australia; 2008–2012	Succeeded by Michael Mischin
Preceded by Colin Barnett	Treasurer of Western Australia; 2010–2012	Succeeded by Colin Barnett
Parliament of Australia
Preceded by Judi Moylan	Member for Pearce; 2013–2022	Succeeded by Tracey Roberts
Political offices
Preceded by Scott Morrison	Minister for Social Services; 2015–2017	Succeeded by Dan Tehan
Preceded by George Brandis	Attorney-General for Australia; 2017–2021	Succeeded by Michaelia Cash
Preceded by Kelly O'Dwyer	Minister for Industrial Relations; 2019–2021	Succeeded by Michaelia Cash
Preceded by Karen Andrews	Minister for Industry, Science and Technology; 2021	Succeeded by Angus Taylor as Minister for Industry, Energy and Emissions Reduction
Preceded by Karen Andrews	Minister for Industry, Science and Technology; 2021	Succeeded by Melissa Price as Minister for Science and Technology
