= Phil Reavis =

American high jumper (1936–2026)

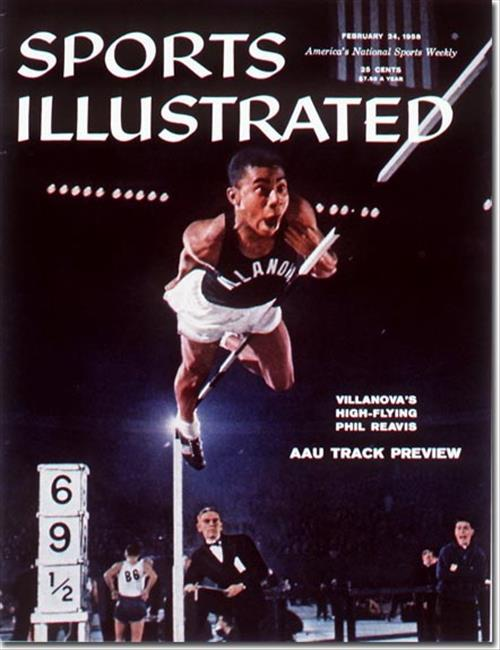
- Reavis on the cover of Sports Illustrated in 1958

Personal information
- Full name: Philip Martin Reavis Sr.
- Nationality: American
- Born: October 10, 1936 Cambridge, Massachusetts, U.S.
- Died: March 21, 2026 (aged 89) Somerville, Massachusetts, U.S.

Sport
- Sport: Track and field
- Event: High jump

Philip Martin Reavis Sr. (October 10, 1936 – March 21, 2026) was an American Olympic high jumper, educator and jazz musician. He competed in the men's high jump at the 1956 Summer Olympics and won the 1956 NCAA championship while representing Villanova University.

Beyond athletics, Reavis had an international career as a teacher and coach across Southeast Asia and later became a longtime educator and musician in Macau, where he led the jazz band The Bridge.

== Early life and education ==
Reavis was born in Cambridge, Massachusetts on October 10, 1936. He developed an early passion for athletics and emerged as a standout high jumper at Somerville High School.

He later attended Villanova University on an athletic scholarship, where he became one of the leading high jumpers in the country.

Reavis had one son, Philip Reavis Jr. At the time of his death, he was survived by his wife, Terry Signaigo, and extended family.

== Athletic career ==
Reavis achieved national prominence in 1956 when he won the NCAA high jump championship while competing for Villanova University.

That same year, he represented the United States at the 1956 Summer Olympics in Melbourne.

He also won the AAU indoor championship in 1957 and was regarded as one of the leading American high jumpers of his era.

Reavis gained national recognition during his collegiate career, including appearing on the cover of Sports Illustrated (February 24, 1958), which featured him as “Villanova’s High-Flying Phil Reavis.”

== Coaching and international career ==
Following his competitive career, Reavis worked internationally as a coach and educator in Southeast Asia, including Cambodia, Vietnam, and Laos.

== Life in Macau and music career ==
Reavis later settled in Macau in the early 1980s, where he lived for more than three decades. He worked as an educator, teaching English and history at St. Joseph’s School, a private educational institution in Macau.

In addition to his teaching career, Reavis became a prominent figure in Macau’s jazz community. A tenor saxophonist, he performed regularly in jazz clubs across the city and led the band The Bridge, contributing to the growth and visibility of jazz music in Macau.

He was associated with performances at local venues and jazz events, and his presence helped sustain and expand Macau’s live jazz scene over several decades.

== Personal life and death ==
Reavis spent much of his later life between Massachusetts and Macau and remained active in education and music. He died on March 21, 2026, at the age of 89. He is also survived by his wife, Terry Signaigo, his son, Phil Reavis Jr., daughter-in-law, Trecia Reavis, grandson, Philip John Reavis, brother, Richard Reavis, and sister-in-law, Cathryn Reavis.

== Legacy ==
Reavis is remembered for his contributions to athletics, education, and cultural exchange.

In 2021, a public athletic field in Somerville, Massachusetts, was named in his honor.

In 2023, the Somerville Museum hosted an exhibition titled Above and Beyond: The Remarkable Life of Somerville Olympian Phil Reavis.
