= Igor Kashkarov =

Soviet high jumper (born 1933)

Personal information
- Born: 5 May 1933 (age 93) Malmyzh, Soviet Union

Sport
- Sport: Track and field
Medal record
Representing Soviet Union
Olympic Games
Bronze medal – third place	1956 Melbourne	High jump
Summer Universiade
Silver medal – second place	1961 Sofia	High jump

Igor Alekseyevich Kashkarov (Russian: Игорь Алексеевич Кашкаров; born 5 May 1933) is a former Soviet athlete who competed mainly in the high jump. He trained at Burevestnik in Moscow.

He competed for the USSR in the 1956 Summer Olympics held in Melbourne, Australia in the high jump where he won the bronze medal.
