= Vladimir Polyakov (high jumper) =

Personal information
- Nationality: Soviet
- Born: 9 August 1935 (age 90)

Sport
- Sport: Athletics
- Event: High jump

Vladimir Polyakov (born 9 August 1935) is a Soviet athlete. He competed in the men's high jump at the 1956 Summer Olympics.
