= Tomsk State University of Control Systems and Radio-electronics =

Coordinates: 56°28′27″N 84°57′00″E

Tomsk State University of Control Systems and Radioelectronics
- Томский государственный университет систем управления и радиоэлектроники
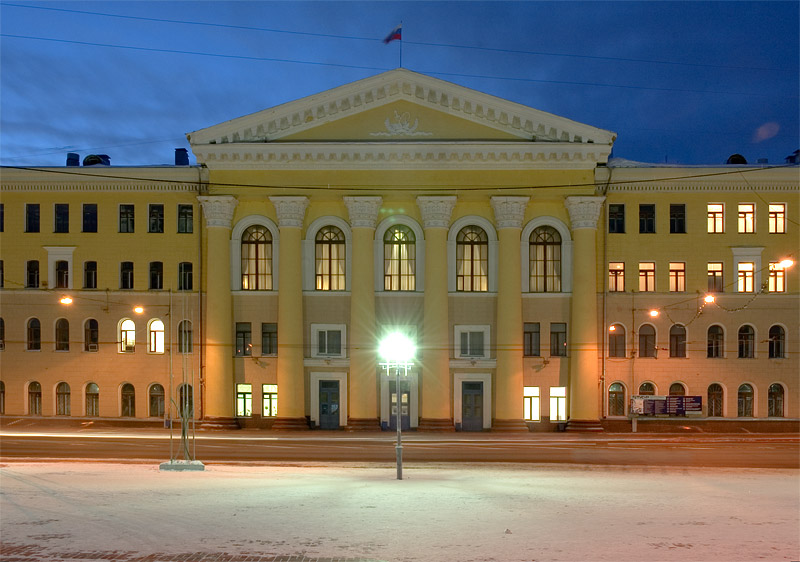
- Established: 1962
- Rector: Victor Rulevskiy
- Academic staff: 970
- Students: 11,000
- Location: Tomsk, Russia
- Website: http://www.tusur.ru/en/

University rankings

Regional – Overall
- QS Emerging Europe and Central Asia: 231-240 (2022)

Tomsk State University of Control Systems and Radioelectronics (Russian: Томский государственный университет систем управления и радиоэлектроники, abbreviated as TUSUR) is a public university in Tomsk, Russia. Founded in 1962, TUSUR University was formed when two faculties, the Faculty of Radio Engineering and the Faculty of Electric Radio Control, split from Tomsk Polytechnic University to create a new educational institution.

== History ==
TUSUR was founded as Tomsk Institute of Radioelectronics and Electronic Engineering by decree of the Council of Ministers of the Soviet Union on April 21, 1962. Its goal was to train engineers and researchers for the radioelectronic, missile and space industries. The university was formed by splitting off two faculties of Tomsk Polytechnic University, the Faculty of Radio Engineering and the Faculty of Electric Radio Control, along with 2000 of their undergraduate and postgraduate students and 60 faculty members. In 1971 the university was renamed as Tomsk Institute of Automated Control Systems and Radioelectronics.

In 1997 TUSUR obtained the status of a university, adopting its modern name.

== Academics ==
TUSUR University offers over 70 degree programs through its 13 faculties:

- Faculty of Radio Engineering
- Faculty of Radio Design
- Faculty of Computer Systems
- Faculty of Control Systems
- Faculty of Electronic Engineering
- Faculty of Economics
- Faculty of Innovation Technologies
- Faculty of Human Sciences
- Faculty of Law
- Faculty of Security
- Faculty of Distance Learning
- Faculty of Extramural and Evening Education
- Faculty of Advanced Training

Project-based learning is an employed teaching method in the university, used to expand and supplement the traditional lecture-based educational process, and is often cited as the key factor determining the high level of employability of TUSUR graduates.

== International affairs ==
TUSUR University ranked third among Russian universities by percentage of international students enrolled in its degree programs. The university is a member of the CDIO Initiative - one of the few Russian universities to have joined the educational framework.

TUSUR runs joint academic programs with numerous partner universities and institutions such as Ritsumeikan University in Japan, State University of New York in the US, EPITECH and the University of Limoges in France, ITRI in Taiwan, International Business Academy in Kazakhstan.

== Research ==
Priority lines of research at TUSUR:

- Nanoelectronics – microwave nanoelectronics, optoelectronics and nanophotonics, plasma emission electronics, electronic components
- Radio and telecommunications systems – radiolocation, television, radio communication and radiometry systems, pulse and radio-frequency measurements, intelligent control systems, information security
- Intelligent power electronics – space technology control and ground testing systems, energy-saving power transmission, distribution and management systems
- Innovations – process management in development of new high-tech products
- Robotics

Research at TUSUR University is supported by its research institutes:

- Research Institute of Automatics and Electromechanics
- Research Institute of Radio Engineering Systems
- Research Institute of Electrical Communications
- Research Institute of Electronic Technology Equipment and Communications
- Research Institute of Industrial Electronics
- Research Institute of LED Technologies
- Research Institute of Space Technology

The university publishes its research results in its quarterly journal Proceedings of TUSUR University. The journal is listed among the leading Russian scientific journals and magazines recommended by the Higher Attestation Commission of Russia for publication of the key research findings of Candidate and Doctoral (PhD) theses in:

- electronics, measurement equipment, radio engineering and communications
- control systems, computers and computer science
- power generation

== UNIQ ==
TUSUR University maintains close links to its alumni and spin-out companies, which form an integral part of the UNIQ.

The UNIQ is a cluster of organizations associated with TUSUR and incorporated into its business-support infrastructure. The UNIQ includes some 150 high-tech companies founded by the TUSUR alumni, 5 research institutes, 48 research laboratories, 26 student design bureaus, engineering center, technology park, student business incubator. The UNIC enterprises are responsible for 80% of the total high-tech product output in Tomsk region.

In 2013 an MIT/Skoltech research named TUSUR University one of the top nine international universities “having created/supported highly effective technology innovation ecosystems despite a challenging environment”.

== Sports ==
TUSUR University has active sports clubs for students, faculty and alumni.

== Culture ==
The University cultivates volunteering among its students, along with the student brigade movement which was a method employed by Soviet universities to engage their students in construction or agricultural projects and offer them an opportunity to make money during their vacations.
