= Electoral district of Murdoch =

Former electoral district in Perth, Western Australia

Murdoch Western Australia—Legislative Assembly
- State: Western Australia
- Dates current: 1977–1989; 1996–2008
- MP: Christian Porter
- Party: Liberal
- Namesake: Walter Murdoch
- Area: 27.0 km^{2} (10.4 sq mi)

Murdoch was an electoral district of the Legislative Assembly in the Australian state of Western Australia. It existed from 1977 to 1989 and again from 1996 to 2008.

Murdoch was named for Sir Walter Murdoch, a prominent academic for whom Murdoch University, which was located in the electorate, was also named. The district was regarded as a safe seat for the Liberal Party, which held the seat for its entirety of two existences.

== Geography ==
At the time it was abolished, Murdoch was bounded by the Canning River to the northeast, Fifth and Karel Avenues to the east, Hope Road to the south, North Lake Road to the west, and Leach Highway to the northwest, and including an additional section between Riseley Street, Blue Gum Reserve and Bull Creek. Its boundaries included Murdoch University, St John of God Hospital in Murdoch and the suburbs of Bateman, Brentwood, Bull Creek, Murdoch, North Lake, Rossmoyne and Winthrop, along with Kardinya east of North Lake Road, Leeming west of Karel Avenue and small portions of Booragoon and Mount Pleasant.

The 2007 redistribution, which came into effect at the 2008 election, saw the electorate replaced by the Bateman electorate, which excluded sections of Murdoch south of South Street (including Murdoch University) but added a small section at its northwest (Booragoon south of Marmion Street and Myaree east of North Lake Road).

== History ==
The seat of Murdoch was established on 9 June 1976 in a redistribution under the Electoral Districts Act 1947, and was first contested at the 1977 state election. While initially thought to be reasonably safe for the Labor party, major demographic change in the mid-1970s resulting from the creation of suburbs such as Bull Creek and Leeming on what had previously been swampy agricultural land, resulted in a relatively safe Liberal seat by the time of the election, and Barry MacKinnon easily won the seat. MacKinnon went on to become Leader of the Opposition from 1986 until 1992, when he lost the leadership to Richard Court and subsequently retired from politics.

The Murdoch electorate was largely replaced by the electorate of Jandakot in the redistribution prior to the 1989 election, but the change was reversed in the following redistribution which took effect at the 1996 election. By this time, Mike Board had replaced MacKinnon as the member for the electorate. Board retired in 2005, and Trevor Sprigg won the seat at the following election. However, following his death on 17 January 2008, a by-election was held on 23 February 2008 at which University of Western Australia law lecturer Christian Porter was elected.

Murdoch was abolished at the 2007 distribution, taking effect at the 2008 election, largely replaced by the new seat of Bateman.

== Members for Murdoch ==
First incarnation (1977–1989)
Member	Party	Term
Barry MacKinnon	Liberal	1977–1989
Second incarnation (1996–2008)
Mike Board	Liberal	1996–2005
Trevor Sprigg	Liberal	2005–2008
Christian Porter	Liberal	2008

== Results ==
2008 Murdoch state by-election
Party	Candidate	Votes	%	±%
Liberal	Christian Porter	13,121	62.82	+14.43
Greens	Hsien Harper	5,502	26.34	+19.01
Christian Democrats	Ka-ren Chew	1,604	7.68	+4.33
One Nation	Neil Gilmour	659	3.16	+2.19
Total formal votes		20,886	96.78	+1.42
Informal votes		696	3.22	−1.42
Turnout		21,582	74.72	−17.12
Two-party-preferred result
Liberal	Christian Porter	14,488	69.39	+13.48
Greens	Hsien Harper	6,392	30.61	+30.61
Liberal hold		Swing	N/A	
