= Yukio Ishikawa =

Japanese high jumper (born 1932)

Personal information
- Nationality: Japanese
- Born: 12 December 1932 (age 93)

Sport
- Sport: Athletics
- Event: High jump

Yukio Ishikawa (石川行男, Ishikawa Yukio; born 12 December 1932) is a Japanese athlete. He competed in the men's high jump at the 1956 Summer Olympics.
