= Vincent Gabriel =

Nigerian high jumper (born 1931)

Personal information
- Nationality: Nigerian
- Born: 1931

Sport
- Sport: Athletics
- Event: High jump

Vincent Ikechuka Gabriel (born 1931) is a Nigerian athlete. He competed in the men's high jump at the 1956 Summer Olympics.

At the Melbourne Olympics (1956), he placed 19th with a score of 1.92. At the 1958 British Empire and Commonwealth Games, he was twelfth.
