= Trevor Sprigg =

Australian politician

Member of the Western Australian Parliament for Murdoch
- In office 26 February 2005 – 17 January 2008
- Preceded by: Mike Board
- Succeeded by: Christian Porter

Personal details
- Born: 10 August 1946 Wagin, Western Australia
- Died: 17 January 2008 (aged 61) Fremantle, Western Australia
- Party: Liberal

Trevor Raymond Sprigg (10 August 1946 – 17 January 2008) was an Australian politician and footballer. A member of the Liberal Party, Sprigg was the Liberal Party legislative whip as well as the member for the electoral district of Murdoch in the Western Australian Legislative Assembly.

Sprigg was elected to his seat in the 2005 Western Australian state election.

== Personal life ==
Sprigg was born in the town of Wagin, Western Australia, in 1946 and was widely known as a sports enthusiast and athlete. He was a lifetime member of the East Fremantle Football Club and played a total of 152 League games for the club. Sprigg also worked at various other football clubs as a coach, chairman of selectors, captain and football manager. For example, he worked for the West Coast Eagles from 1990 to 1992. Sprigg also worked as a consultant to the Western Australian Football Commission during the planning and formation of the Fremantle Football Club.

Additionally, Sprigg worked for the Australian Broadcasting Corporation, as well as several radio stations and newspapers, as a part-time columnist and football commentator. He was awarded an Australian Sports Medal in 2000.

Sprigg was married and had five children and seven grandchildren.

== Death ==
Trevor Sprigg died from a heart attack at Fremantle Hospital in Perth on 17 January 2008 at the age of 61.

His heart attack and death prevented him from attending a partyroom meeting that day which saw Troy Buswell replace Paul Omodei as Liberal leader.
