= Mike Board =

Australian politician

Michael Francis Board (born 15 June 1952) is a former Australian politician.

Board was born in Paddington in Sydney and worked as a clothing manufacturer and wholesaler. He arrived in Western Australia in 1985. From 1988 to 1991, he was a councillor for the City of Melville. In 1990, he was the city's deputy mayor.

In 1993, Board was elected to the Western Australian Legislative Assembly as the Liberal member for Jandakot, moving to the new seat of Murdoch in 1996. From 1997 he was Minister for Works, Services, Youth and Multicultural Affairs, the latter being replaced by Citizenship and Multicultural Interests in 1998. From 1999 to 2001 he was Minister for Employment and Training, Youth and The Arts, and after the Liberal Party's defeat in 2001 he was Shadow Minister for Health and Youth until 2004. He retired from politics in 2005.

Western Australian Legislative Assembly
| Preceded by Barry MacKinnon | Member for Jandakot; 1993–1996 | Abolished |
| New seat | Member for Murdoch; 1996–2005 | Succeeded by Trevor Sprigg |
