= Patrick Etolu =

Ugandan high jumper

Personal information
- Nationality: Ugandan
- Born: 17 March 1935 Soroti District, Eastern Region, Uganda
- Died: 24 December 2013 (aged 78) Soroti, Eastern Region, Uganda

Sport
- Sport: Athletics
- Event: High jump

Achievements and titles
- Personal best: 6 ft 8 in (2.03 m)
Medal record
Men's athletics
Representing Uganda
British Empire and Commonwealth Games
Silver medal – second place	1954 Vancouver	High jump

Patrick Etolu (17 March 1935 – 24 December 2013) was a Ugandan high jumper. He was born in Soroti District, Eastern Region, Uganda. He won a silver medal at the Commonwealth Games and won the high jump at the 1953 Central African Games.

== Biography ==
Etolu competed internationally at the 1954 British Empire and Commonwealth Games in Vancouver, Canada, where he won the silver medal in the high jump with a jump of 6 ft 6 1/4 in (1.99 m). In doing so, he became the first athlete to win a medal for Uganda at the Commonwealth Games.

Two years later in November 1956 in Bombay, Etolu cleared 6 ft 8 in (2.03 m). This set a national record which stood until May 1999. One month later he was part of the maiden Ugandan team that competed at the 1956 Summer Olympics. He finished in equal 12th place in the high jump with a jump of 1.96 m (6 ft 5 in).

Etolu won the British AAA Championships title at the 1958 AAA Championships. Shortly afterwards he competed at the 1958 British Empire and Commonwealth Games in Cardiff, Wales, he finished in fourth place in the final of the high jump with a jump of 6 ft 6 in (1.98 m).

At his final international meet, the 1962 British Empire and Commonwealth Games in Perth, Western Australia, Etolu finished ninth in the high jump clearing the bar at 6 ft 6 in (1.98 m).

Etolu died on 24 December 2013 in Mulago Hospital at the age of 78 after being admitted with breathing difficulties and swollen legs. He is survived by his wife and six children.
