= Chilla Porter =

Australian high jumper and politician (1936–2020)

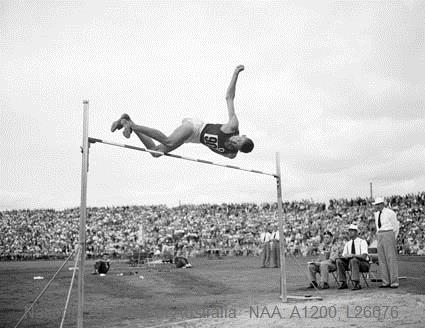

Personal information
- Full name: Charles Michael Porter
- Nickname: Chilla
- Born: 11 January 1936 Brisbane, Queensland, Australia
- Died: 15 August 2020 (aged 84) Innaloo, Western Australia, Australia
- Education: Anglican Church Grammar School
Medal record
Men's athletics
Representing Australia
Olympic Games
Silver medal – second place	1956 Melbourne	High jump
British Empire and Commonwealth Games
Silver medal – second place	1958 Cardiff	High jump
Silver medal – second place	1962 Perth	High jump

Charles Michael "Chilla" Porter (11 January 1936 – 15 August 2020) was an Australian athlete and political figure. He won a silver medal in the high jump at the 1956 Summer Olympics in Melbourne. He later served as general secretary of the Liberal Party of Australia (Western Australian Division) from 1978 to 1987.

== Early life ==
Porter was born in Brisbane, the son of Charles Robert Porter who was a Queensland state Liberal MP between 1966 and 1980 and served in the ministry of Joh Bjelke-Petersen. He was educated at the Anglican Church Grammar School.

== Athletics ==
Porter was a high jumper who utilized the straddle technique, the dominant high jump technique before the Fosbury Flop emerged in the 1960s. At the age of 19, Porter competed for Australia in the high jump at the 1956 Summer Olympics held in Melbourne, Australia, finishing second and taking the silver medal with a leap height of 2.10m, more than 5 cm higher than his previous personal best. American Charles Dumas won the gold medal, setting an Olympic record of 2.12m, higher than the previous Olympic best by 7 cm. The event was known for lasting more than five hours and continuing well into dusk in front of 60,000 fans at the Melbourne Cricket Ground, and was the longest field event in Olympic history. The Australian media heavily covered the event, including the television station GTV9, which had just recently begun transmitting.

He also won silver medals in the 1958 British Empire and Commonwealth Games held in Cardiff, UK, with a height 2.03m, and in the 1962 British Empire and Commonwealth Games in Perth, Western Australia with a height of 2.08m.

Between 1955 and 1961, he won seven straight Australian high jump titles and held the national record for six years. He was the first Australian high jump athlete to clear the height of 2.10m.

== Post-athletics career ==
Porter moved to Perth in the early 1960s where he married Nerida Chater. He worked for the Liberal Party of Australia (Western Australian Division) as a divisional field officer in the seats of Fremantle, Perth and Stirling. He subsequently became a senior field officer and then was appointed general secretary (equivalent to the modern position of state director) in 1978. After a series of electoral defeats he resigned in April 1987 and worked as director of a marketing agency. Porter returned to the Liberal Party as chair of the state campaign committee from 1994 to 1996.

Porter was appointed chairman of the Western Australian Institute of Sport (WAIS) in 1995 by the state Liberal government. He held the position only until 1996 but was "instrumental in WAIS developing a new purpose-built facility at Challenge Stadium". Over the same period, Porter was director of Controlled Marketing, a fundraising firm that managed fundraising for several charities in Western Australia, as well as fundraising for the Liberal Party. The company was criticized for the amount of money that was distributed to the charities after fundraising costs were deducted. In addition to fundraising, Controlled Marketing was also involved in pre-election push polling.

Porter was inducted into the Athletics Australia Hall of Fame in 2011.

== Personal life and death ==
His son Christian Porter was the Liberal member for Pearce in Western Australia in the Australian House of Representatives.

Porter died on 15 August 2020, after a long battle with cancer. He was 84.
