= 1961 in Soviet football =

Football in the Soviet Union
- Season: 1961

Men's football
- Class A: Dinamo Kiev
- Class B: Krylia Sovetov Kuibyshev (Russia); Chernomorets Odessa (Ukraine); Torpedo Kutaisi (Republics playoffs)
- Soviet Cup: Shakhter Stalino

The 1961 Soviet football championship was the 29th seasons of competitive football in the Soviet Union and the 23rd among teams of sports societies and factories. Dinamo won the championship becoming the Soviet domestic champions for the first time.

== Honours ==
Competition	Winner	Runner-up
Class A	Dinamo Kiev (1)	Torpedo Moscow
Class B	Krylia Sovetov Kuibyshev (Russia)	Terek Groznyi (Russia)
Class B	Chernomorets Odessa (Ukraine)	SKA Odessa (Ukraine)
Class B	Lokomotiv Tbilisi (Republics group 1)	Shirak Leninakan (Republics group 1)
Class B	Torpedo Kutaisi (Republics group 2)	Shakhter Karaganda (Republics group 2)
Soviet Cup	Shakhter Stalino (1)	Torpedo Moscow

Notes = Number in parentheses is the times that club has won that honour. * indicates new record for competition

== Soviet Union football championship ==
=== Class A (second stage) ===
==== Places 1–10 ====
Pos	Team	Pld	W	D	L	GF	GA	GD	Pts
1	(Russian Soviet Federative Socialist Republic) Dynamo Kyiv (C)	30	18	9	3	58	28	+30	45
2	(Russian Soviet Federative Socialist Republic) Torpedo Moscow	30	19	3	8	68	35	+33	41
3	(Russian Soviet Federative Socialist Republic) Spartak Moscow	30	16	8	6	57	34	+23	40
4	(Russian Soviet Federative Socialist Republic) CSKA Moscow	30	16	6	8	61	43	+18	38
5	(Russian Soviet Federative Socialist Republic) Lokomotiv Moscow	30	13	12	5	58	42	+16	38
6	(Ukrainian Soviet Socialist Republic) Avangard Kharkov	30	12	10	8	30	25	+5	34
7	(Georgian Soviet Socialist Republic) Dinamo Tbilisi	30	13	7	10	50	30	+20	33
8	(Armenian Soviet Socialist Republic) Spartak Yerevan	30	11	10	9	37	41	−4	32
9	(Russian Soviet Federative Socialist Republic) SKA Rostov-on-Don	30	11	8	11	54	36	+18	30
10	(Uzbek Soviet Socialist Republic) Pakhtakor Tashkent	30	11	8	11	44	61	−17	30

Source: rsssf.com
(C) Champions

==== Places 11–22 ====
Pos	Team	Pld	W	D	L	GF	GA	GD	Pts	Relegation
11	(Russian Soviet Federative Socialist Republic) Dynamo Moscow	32	17	7	8	57	39	+18	41	
12	(Ukrainian Soviet Socialist Republic) Shakhter Stalino	32	12	10	10	45	37	+8	34	
13	(Russian Soviet Federative Socialist Republic) Zenit Leningrad	32	12	8	12	50	52	−2	32	
14	(Russian Soviet Federative Socialist Republic) Admiralteets Leningrad (Note: Admiralteets Leningrad were disbanded after the season and they were replaced by Dynamo Leningrad.)	32	12	7	13	49	47	+2	31	
15	(Russian Soviet Federative Socialist Republic) Trud Voronezh (Note: Trud Voronezh were relegated because they were a worst ranked team from Russia.) (R)	32	11	8	13	39	38	+1	30	Relegation to Class B
16	(Moldavian Soviet Socialist Republic) Moldova Chisinau	32	12	6	14	46	54	−8	30	
17	(Kazakh Soviet Socialist Republic) Kairat Alma-Ata	32	10	8	14	31	48	−17	28	
18	(Azerbaijan Soviet Socialist Republic) Neftyanik Baku	32	7	13	12	36	52	−16	27	
19	(Byelorussian Soviet Socialist Republic) Belarus Minsk	32	7	10	15	29	44	−15	24	
20	(Lithuanian Soviet Socialist Republic) Spartak Vilnius	32	7	5	20	33	64	−31	19	
21	(Latvian Soviet Socialist Republic) Daugava Rīga	32	5	7	20	30	63	−33	17	
22	(Estonian Soviet Socialist Republic) Kalev Tallinn (R)	32	1	8	23	25	74	−49	10	Qualification for relegation play-off

Source: rsssf.com
(R) Relegated

==== Promotion/relegation Tournament ====
Pos	Team	Pld	W	D	L	GF	GA	GD	Pts	Promotion or relegation
1	(Georgian Soviet Socialist Republic) Torpedo Kutaisi (R)	4	3	0	1	7	4	+3	6	Promotion to Class A
2	(Estonian Soviet Socialist Republic) Kalev Tallinn (R)	4	2	0	2	4	2	+2	4	Relegation to Class B
3	(Georgian Soviet Socialist Republic) Lokomotiv Tbilisi	4	1	0	3	3	8	−5	2	

Source: rsssf.com
(R) Relegated

=== Class B ===
==== Russian Federation finals ====
[Oct 24 – Nov 5, Krasnodar]

Pos	Team	Pld	W	D	L	GF	GA	GD	Pts	Promotion
1	Krylya Sovetov Kuibyshev	5	4	0	1	12	5	+7	8	Promoted
2	Terek Grozny	5	3	1	1	8	5	+3	7	
3	Dinamo Kirov	5	2	1	2	7	7	0	5	
4	Lokomotiv Chelyabinsk	5	2	0	3	5	5	0	4	
5	SKA Khabarovsk	5	2	0	3	4	7	−3	4	
6	Volga Kalinin	5	1	0	4	4	11	−7	2	

==== Ukraine (playoffs) ====
For places 1-2

- Chernomorets Odessa 2-1 0-0 SKA Odessa

==== Union republics finals ====
- no finals
- Torpedo Kutaisi and Lokomotiv Tbilisi qualified for promotion playoffs as two group winners

=== Top goalscorers ===
Class A

- Gennadiy Gusarov (Torpedo Moscow) – 22 goals
