= 1961 Soviet Top League =

23rd season of top-tier football league in Soviet Union

Soviet Top League
- Season: 1961

22 teams took part in the league with FC Dynamo Kyiv winning the championship (the first Soviet champion from outside Moscow).

== Round 1 ==
=== Group A ===
==== Table ====
Pos	Team	Pld	W	D	L	GF	GA	GD	Pts	Qualification
1	(Russian Soviet Federative Socialist Republic) Torpedo Moscow	20	16	1	3	48	20	+28	33	Qualification for Places 1–10 group
2	(Russian Soviet Federative Socialist Republic) Lokomotiv Moscow	20	9	8	3	35	23	+12	26	Qualification for Places 1–10 group
3	(Ukrainian Soviet Socialist Republic) Avangard Kharkov	20	10	6	4	22	15	+7	26	Qualification for Places 1–10 group
4	(Georgian Soviet Socialist Republic) Dinamo Tbilisi	20	10	5	5	36	22	+14	25	Qualification for Places 1–10 group
5	(Russian Soviet Federative Socialist Republic) SKA Rostov-on-Don	20	9	4	7	39	22	+17	22	Qualification for Places 1–10 group
6	(Ukrainian Soviet Socialist Republic) Shakhter Stalino	20	7	5	8	22	23	−1	19	Qualification for Places 11–22 group
7	(Azerbaijan Soviet Socialist Republic) Neftyanik Baku	20	4	8	8	20	34	−14	16	Qualification for Places 11–22 group
8	(Russian Soviet Federative Socialist Republic) Trud Voronezh	20	5	5	10	24	31	−7	15	Qualification for Places 11–22 group
9	(Russian Soviet Federative Socialist Republic) Admiralteet Leningrad	20	5	5	10	22	30	−8	15	Qualification for Places 11–22 group
10	(Latvian Soviet Socialist Republic) Daugava Rīga	20	3	6	11	21	41	−20	12	Qualification for Places 11–22 group
11	(Lithuanian Soviet Socialist Republic) Spartak Vilnius	20	3	5	12	18	46	−28	11	Qualification for Places 11–22 group

Source: rsssf.com

==== Results ====
Home \ Away	ADM	AVA	DAU	DTB	LOK	NEF	SHA	SKA	SVL	TOR	TRU
Admiralteet Leningrad		0–1	1–1	0–3	1–1	2–2	3–1	0–1	0–2	0–1	2–1
Avangard Kharkov	0–0		1–0	1–0	1–1	0–1	3–2	3–2	1–0	2–1	2–0
Daugava Rīga	0–2	1–1		0–3	2–2	1–1	1–2	1–1	1–2	0–5	2–0
Dinamo Tbilisi	1–0	1–0	2–1		4–0	3–0	0–0	1–1	3–1	6–4	1–1
Lokomotiv Moscow	0–2	2–1	3–2	5–0		2–2	1–0	0–0	5–2	0–1	5–1
Neftyanik Baku	1–1	1–1	1–2	1–1	1–1		1–2	1–0	1–0	1–7	1–0
Shakhter Stalino	0–1	0–0	1–2	2–0	2–2	1–0		4–2	4–0	0–3	1–0
SKA Rostov-on-Don	2–0	0–1	6–1	3–1	0–1	5–1	3–0		5–1	1–1	4–1
Spartak Vilnius	3–2	1–1	0–0	0–5	1–3	1–1	0–0	1–2		0–1	2–2
Torpedo Moscow	6–3	2–1	3–1	1–0	0–1	3–2	1–0	1–0	3–1		3–1
Trud Voronezh	3–2	0–1	4–2	1–1	0–0	1–0	0–0	2–1	6–0	0–1	

Legend: Blue = home team win; Yellow = draw; Red = away team win.

=== Group B ===
==== Table ====
Pos	Team	Pld	W	D	L	GF	GA	GD	Pts	Qualification
1	(Russian Soviet Federative Socialist Republic) CSKA Moscow	20	13	3	4	55	28	+27	29	Qualification for Places 1–10 group
2	(Ukrainian Soviet Socialist Republic) Dynamo Kyiv	20	12	5	3	41	19	+22	29	Qualification for Places 1–10 group
3	(Russian Soviet Federative Socialist Republic) Spartak Moscow	20	10	5	5	38	21	+17	25	Qualification for Places 1–10 group
4	(Armenian Soviet Socialist Republic) Spartak Yerevan	20	8	7	5	27	26	+1	23	Qualification for Places 1–10 group
5	(Uzbek Soviet Socialist Republic) Pakhtakor Tashkent	20	9	5	6	30	33	−3	23	Qualification for Places 1–10 group
6	(Russian Soviet Federative Socialist Republic) Dynamo Moscow	20	8	5	7	33	29	+4	21	Qualification for Places 11–22 group
7	(Kazakh Soviet Socialist Republic) Kairat Almaty	20	6	5	9	23	32	−9	17	Qualification for Places 11–22 group
8	(Russian Soviet Federative Socialist Republic) Zenit Leningrad	20	6	5	9	25	35	−10	17	Qualification for Places 11–22 group
9	(Moldavian Soviet Socialist Republic) Moldova Chișinău	20	6	4	10	30	36	−6	16	Qualification for Places 11–22 group
10	(Byelorussian Soviet Socialist Republic) Belarus Minsk	20	4	5	11	17	31	−14	13	Qualification for Places 11–22 group
11	(Estonian Soviet Socialist Republic) Kalev Tallinn	20	0	7	13	14	43	−29	7	Qualification for Places 11–22 group

Source: rsssf.com

==== Results ====
Home \ Away	BEL	CSK	DYK	DYN	KAI	KAL	MOL	PAK	SPA	SYE	ZEN
Belarus Minsk		1–2	1–1	2–0	0–1	2–1	1–1	1–3	2–0	1–1	0–0
CSKA Moscow	3–0		1–1	5–1	4–1	1–0	6–4	6–2	1–2	4–1	3–1
Dynamo Kyiv	2–1	1–1		3–1	5–1	6–1	2–0	3–1	2–0	1–0	3–0
Dynamo Moscow	4–1	1–3	5–0		1–1	1–0	5–2	2–2	3–1	0–1	1–0
Kairat Almaty	2–0	1–1	0–2	0–0		3–0	1–3	1–1	1–5	0–1	2–0
Kalev Tallinn	1–2	0–4	0–4	0–0	1–2		1–2	1–1	2–2	2–2	1–1
Moldova Chișinău	1–0	2–1	1–3	1–2	1–0	1–1		1–3	1–1	2–3	5–0
Pakhtakor Tashkent	1–0	3–2	2–1	0–0	3–2	0–0	3–2		0–2	1–0	0–1
Spartak Moscow	3–0	3–1	2–0	3–1	1–0	5–1	0–0	0–1		0–1	2–2
Spartak Yerevan	1–1	2–4	0–0	2–4	2–2	2–0	1–0	4–2	0–0		3–2
Zenit Leningrad	3–1	1–2	1–1	2–1	1–2	2–1	2–0	4–1	2–6	0–0	

Legend: Blue = home team win; Yellow = draw; Red = away team win.

== Round 2 ==
=== Places 1–10 ===
==== Table ====
Pos	Team	Pld	W	D	L	GF	GA	GD	Pts
1	(Russian Soviet Federative Socialist Republic) Dynamo Kyiv (C)	30	18	9	3	58	28	+30	45
2	(Russian Soviet Federative Socialist Republic) Torpedo Moscow	30	19	3	8	68	35	+33	41
3	(Russian Soviet Federative Socialist Republic) Spartak Moscow	30	16	8	6	57	34	+23	40
4	(Russian Soviet Federative Socialist Republic) CSKA Moscow	30	16	6	8	61	43	+18	38
5	(Russian Soviet Federative Socialist Republic) Lokomotiv Moscow	30	13	12	5	58	42	+16	38
6	(Ukrainian Soviet Socialist Republic) Avangard Kharkov	30	12	10	8	30	25	+5	34
7	(Georgian Soviet Socialist Republic) Dinamo Tbilisi	30	13	7	10	50	30	+20	33
8	(Armenian Soviet Socialist Republic) Spartak Yerevan	30	11	10	9	37	41	−4	32
9	(Russian Soviet Federative Socialist Republic) SKA Rostov-on-Don	30	11	8	11	54	36	+18	30
10	(Uzbek Soviet Socialist Republic) Pakhtakor Tashkent	30	11	8	11	44	61	−17	30

Source: rsssf.com
(C) Champions

==== Results ====
Home \ Away	AVA	CSK	DYK	DTB	LOK	PAK	SKA	SPA	SYE	TOR
Avangard Kharkov		0–0	1–1			4–1		0–1	2–0	
CSKA Moscow	1–0			1–0	1–1		1–0			0–3
Dynamo Kyiv	0–0			1–0	2–2		1–0			2–0
Dinamo Tbilisi		3–0	0–1			4–0		0–0	–:+ (Note: Victory awarded 3–0 to Spartak Yerevan; on the field he finished 3–1.)	
Lokomotiv Moscow		4–0	3–4			2–1		3–1	1–0	
Pakhtakor Tashkent	3–1			1–4	4–4		1–1			1–0
SKA Rostov-on-Don		0–0	2–4			2–2		1–2	3–0	
Spartak Moscow	0–0			3–2	4–1		1–1			4–3
Spartak Yerevan	3–0			1–1	2–2		2–5			1–0
Torpedo Moscow		4–2	1–1			6–0		2–3	1–1	

Legend: Blue = home team win; Yellow = draw; Red = away team win.

=== Places 11–22 ===
==== Table ====
Pos	Team	Pld	W	D	L	GF	GA	GD	Pts	Relegation
11	(Russian Soviet Federative Socialist Republic) Dynamo Moscow	32	17	7	8	57	39	+18	41	
12	(Ukrainian Soviet Socialist Republic) Shakhter Stalino	32	12	10	10	45	37	+8	34	
13	(Russian Soviet Federative Socialist Republic) Zenit Leningrad	32	12	8	12	50	52	−2	32	
14	(Russian Soviet Federative Socialist Republic) Admiralteets Leningrad (Note: Admiralteets Leningrad were disbanded after the season and they were replaced by Dynamo Leningrad.)	32	12	7	13	49	47	+2	31	
15	(Russian Soviet Federative Socialist Republic) Trud Voronezh (Note: Trud Voronezh were relegated because they were a worst ranked team from Russia.) (R)	32	11	8	13	39	38	+1	30	Relegation to Class B
16	(Moldavian Soviet Socialist Republic) Moldova Chișinău	32	12	6	14	46	54	−8	30	
17	(Kazakh Soviet Socialist Republic) Kairat Alma-Ata	32	10	8	14	31	48	−17	28	
18	(Azerbaijan Soviet Socialist Republic) Neftyanik Baku	32	7	13	12	36	52	−16	27	
19	(Byelorussian Soviet Socialist Republic) Belarus Minsk	32	7	10	15	29	44	−15	24	
20	(Lithuanian Soviet Socialist Republic) Spartak Vilnius	32	7	5	20	33	64	−31	19	
21	(Latvian Soviet Socialist Republic) Daugava Rīga	32	5	7	20	30	63	−33	17	
22	(Estonian Soviet Socialist Republic) Kalev Tallinn (R)	32	1	8	23	25	74	−49	10	Qualification for relegation play-off

Source: rsssf.com
(R) Relegated

==== Results ====
Home \ Away	ADM	BEL	DAU	DYN	KAI	KAL	MOL	NEF	SHA	SVL	TRU	ZEN
Admiralteets Leningrad		2–1		1–2	2–1	6–2	5–2					2–1
Belarus Minsk	0–0		2–0					0–0	1–1	0–1	1–1	
Daugava Rīga		1–3		0–1	1–1	1–0	0–2					0–2
Dynamo Moscow	4–1		2–1					3–1	3–1	3–0	2–0	
Kairat Alma-Ata	0–3		2–1					2–0	0–0	1–0	0–0	
Kalev Tallinn	0–2		2–3					1–2	1–0	1–5	0–2	
Moldova Chișinău	2–1		1–0					1–0	0–0	3–1	1–0	
Neftyanik Baku		1–1		2–2	2–0	3–0	2–2					2–2
Shakhter Stalino		4–2		0–0	6–0	3–2	2–1					5–3
Spartak Vilnius		0–1		1–2	0–1	3–1	4–1					0–1
Trud Voronezh		2–0		2–0	1–0	1–1	3–0					2–0
Zenit Leningrad	2–2		4–1					4–1	1–1	3–0	2–1	

Legend: Blue = home team win; Yellow = draw; Red = away team win.

=== Top scorers ===
22 goals

- Gennadi Gusarov (Torpedo Moscow)

20 goals

- Gennadi Krasnitsky (Pakhtakor Tashkent)
- Viktor Voroshilov (Lokomotiv Moscow)

18 goals

- Viktor Kanevskyi (Dynamo Kyiv)
- Aleksei Mamykin (CSKA Moscow)

15 goals

- Igor Chislenko (Dynamo Moscow)
- Sergey Kvochkin (Kairat Alma-Ata)

14 goals

- Zaur Kaloyev (Dinamo Tbilisi)
- Galimzyan Khusainov (Spartak Moscow)
- Yuri Zakharov (Shakhtyor Stalino)

=== Promotion/relegation Tournament ===
Pos	Team	Pld	W	D	L	GF	GA	GD	Pts	Promotion or relegation
1	(Georgian Soviet Socialist Republic) Torpedo Kutaisi (R)	4	3	0	1	7	4	+3	6	Promotion to Class A
2	(Estonian Soviet Socialist Republic) Kalev Tallinn (R)	4	2	0	2	4	2	+2	4	Relegation to Class B
3	(Georgian Soviet Socialist Republic) Lokomotiv Tbilisi	4	1	0	3	3	8	−5	2	

Source: rsssf.com
(R) Relegated
