= 1961 Soviet Class B =

Soviet Class B
- Season: 1961

1961 Soviet Class B was the twelfth season of the Soviet Class B football competitions since their establishment in 1950. It was also the 21st season of what eventually became known as the Soviet First League.

== Russian Federation ==
=== I Zone ===
Pos	Team	Pld	W	D	L	GF	GA	GD	Pts
1	Volga Kalinin	24	16	5	3	52	11	+41	37
2	Metallurg Cherepovets	24	15	4	5	50	18	+32	34
3	Dinamo Leningrad	24	15	4	5	49	22	+27	34
4	Shinnik Yaroslavl	24	13	5	6	55	27	+28	31
5	Shakhtyor Stalinogorsk	24	14	3	7	35	17	+18	31
6	Trud Tula	24	11	6	7	36	22	+14	28
7	Spartak Leningrad	24	11	6	7	51	39	+12	28
8	Textilshchik Kostroma	24	9	4	11	29	37	−8	22
9	Dinamo Bryansk	24	8	4	12	31	47	−16	20
10	Sputnik Kaluga	24	5	4	15	25	51	−26	14
11	Tralflotovets Murmansk	24	3	7	14	20	49	−29	13
12	Onezhets Petrozavodsk	24	5	0	19	21	65	−44	10
13	Ilmen Novgorod	24	3	4	17	15	64	−49	10

Notes:

Notes:

Textilshchik Kostroma was called Spartak.

=== II Zone ===
Pos	Team	Pld	W	D	L	GF	GA	GD	Pts
1	Dinamo Kirov	24	14	4	6	46	28	+18	32
2	Baltika Kaliningrad	24	13	6	5	41	25	+16	32
3	Iskra Kazan	24	11	9	4	31	22	+9	31
4	Zenit Izhevsk	24	11	8	5	33	22	+11	30
5	Trud Kaliningrad (Moskva Reg)	24	10	6	8	38	33	+5	26
6	Raketa Gorkiy	24	10	6	8	28	28	0	26
7	Torpedo Gorkiy	24	7	9	8	25	25	0	23
8	Textilshchik Ivanovo	24	9	5	10	27	29	−2	23
9	Znamya Truda Orekhovo-Zuyevo	24	8	6	10	35	37	−2	22
10	MVO Serpukhov	24	8	5	11	29	27	+2	21
11	Trud Noginsk	24	6	7	11	23	32	−9	19
12	Traktor Vladimir	24	5	5	14	16	32	−16	15
13	Spartak Smolensk	24	3	6	15	21	53	−32	12

Notes:

Notes:

Trud Glukhovo relocated to Noginsk.
Spartak Smolensk was called Textilshchik.

=== III Zone ===
Pos	Team	Pld	W	D	L	GF	GA	GD	Pts
1	Krylya Sovetov Kuibyshev	23	17	2	4	68	22	+46	36
2	Sokol Saratov	23	14	4	5	40	20	+20	32
3	Traktor Stalingrad	23	14	4	5	40	24	+16	32
4	Trudoviye Rezervy Kursk	23	9	7	7	32	29	+3	25
5	Spartak Ryazan	23	10	4	9	35	32	+3	24
6	Torpedo Lipetsk	23	10	4	9	31	32	−1	24
7	Energiya Volzhskiy	23	9	5	9	32	34	−2	23
8	Zarya Penza	23	8	5	10	30	31	−1	21
9	Spartak Tambov	23	8	3	12	36	49	−13	19
10	Neftyanik Syzran	23	6	5	12	20	38	−18	17
11	Lokomotiv Oryol	23	7	2	14	32	45	−13	16
12	Spartak Ulyanovsk	23	4	7	12	26	47	−21	15
13	Cementnik Belgorod	12	1	2	9	5	24	−19	4

Notes:

Notes:

Sokol Saratov was called Lokomotiv.
Spartak Ryazan was called Trud.
Torpedo Lipetsk was called Trudoviye Rezervy.

=== IV Zone ===
Pos	Team	Pld	W	D	L	GF	GA	GD	Pts
1	Terek Grozny	24	18	2	4	51	16	+35	38
2	RostSelMash Rostov-na-Donu	24	15	7	2	67	28	+39	37
3	Torpedo Taganrog	24	14	4	6	38	20	+18	32
4	Shakhtyor Shakhty	24	12	6	6	37	23	+14	30
5	Torpedo Armavir	24	8	9	7	26	26	0	25
6	Spartak Stavropol	24	10	4	10	33	33	0	24
7	Cement Novorossiysk	24	9	6	9	30	33	−3	24
8	Spartak Krasnodar	24	9	4	11	29	29	0	22
9	Dinamo Makhachkala	24	6	7	11	27	35	−8	19
10	Spartak Orjonikidze	24	6	6	12	32	57	−25	18
11	Trudoviye Rezervy Kislovodsk	24	5	6	13	25	45	−20	16
12	Spartak Nalchik	24	4	7	13	22	40	−18	15
13	Volgar Astrakhan	24	5	2	17	23	55	−32	12

Notes:

Notes:

Dinamo Makhachkala was called Temp.

=== V Zone ===
Pos	Team	Pld	W	D	L	GF	GA	GD	Pts
1	Lokomotiv Chelyabinsk	24	14	6	4	37	15	+22	34
2	UralMash Sverdlovsk	24	14	5	5	44	17	+27	33
3	Stroitel Ufa	24	12	6	6	36	19	+17	30
4	Lokomotiv Orenburg	24	12	6	6	42	27	+15	30
5	Zvezda Perm	24	12	4	8	38	27	+11	28
6	Metallurg Nizhniy Tagil	24	9	8	7	40	27	+13	26
7	Irtysh Omsk	24	9	8	7	33	26	+7	26
8	Stroitel Kurgan	24	8	9	7	28	34	−6	25
9	Torpedo Pavlovo	24	6	12	6	21	22	−1	24
10	Metallurg Magnitogorsk	24	6	6	12	25	38	−13	18
11	Khimik Berezniki	24	5	6	13	22	51	−29	16
12	Stroitel Saransk	24	3	7	14	14	48	−34	13
13	Geolog Tyumen	24	2	5	17	23	52	−29	9

=== VI Zone ===
Pos	Team	Pld	W	D	L	GF	GA	GD	Pts
1	SKA Khabarovsk	24	16	4	4	43	14	+29	36
2	SKA Novosibirsk	24	15	3	6	51	26	+25	33
3	Luch Vladivostok	24	13	6	5	42	27	+15	32
4	Temp Barnaul	24	12	6	6	41	33	+8	30
5	Lokomotiv Krasnoyarsk	24	12	5	7	60	35	+25	29
6	Tomich Tomsk	24	11	7	6	36	29	+7	29
7	Angara Irkutsk	24	9	6	9	41	36	+5	24
8	Avangard Komsomolsk-na-Amure	24	7	8	9	27	32	−5	22
9	Baykal Ulan-Ude	24	5	9	10	21	28	−7	19
10	Khimik Kemerovo	24	7	5	12	28	44	−16	19
11	Amur Blagoveshchensk	24	5	7	12	23	40	−17	17
12	Metallurg Stalinsk	24	5	5	14	28	49	−21	15
13	Zabaikalets Chita	24	3	1	20	21	69	−48	7

Notes:

Notes:

Tomich Tomsk was called SibElectroMotor.
Angara Irkutsk was called Mashinostroitel.
Baykal Ulan-Ude was called Lokomotiv.

=== Final ===
[Oct 24 – Nov 5, Krasnodar]

Pos	Team	Pld	W	D	L	GF	GA	GD	Pts	Promotion
1	Krylya Sovetov Kuibyshev	5	4	0	1	12	5	+7	8	Promoted
2	Terek Grozny	5	3	1	1	8	5	+3	7	
3	Dinamo Kirov	5	2	1	2	7	7	0	5	
4	Lokomotiv Chelyabinsk	5	2	0	3	5	5	0	4	
5	SKA Khabarovsk	5	2	0	3	4	7	−3	4	
6	Volga Kalinin	5	1	0	4	4	11	−7	2	

== Ukraine ==
=== Final ===
- Chernomorets Odessa 2-1 0-0 SKA Odessa

== Union republics ==
=== I Zone ===
Pos	Rep	Team	Pld	W	D	L	GF	GA	GD	Pts
1	GEO	Lokomotiv Tbilisi	30	20	7	3	59	24	+35	47
2	ARM	Shirak Leninakan	30	16	7	7	56	28	+28	39
3	BLR	Lokomotiv Gomel	30	14	8	8	37	24	+13	36
4	BLR	Khimik Mogilyov	30	14	8	8	45	37	+8	36
5	ARM	Lori Kirovakan	30	13	9	8	35	24	+11	35
6	GEO	Dinamo Batumi	30	11	13	6	36	28	+8	35
7	LVA	REZ Riga	30	13	7	10	54	41	+13	33
8	BLR	Krasnoye Znamya Vitebsk	30	12	8	10	44	46	−2	32
9	GEO	Ritsa Sukhumi	30	12	5	13	42	35	+7	29
10	MDA	Nistrul Bendery	30	9	8	13	32	50	−18	26
11	MDA	Pishchevik Tiraspol	30	9	6	15	35	53	−18	24
12	EST	SKF Tallinn	30	7	9	14	32	50	−18	23
13	BLR	Spartak Brest	30	7	8	15	28	43	−15	22
14	LTU	Banga Kaunas	30	9	4	17	31	46	−15	22
15	BLR	Bobruisk	30	6	9	15	26	46	−20	21
16	LVA	SelMash Liepaja	30	6	8	16	31	48	−17	20

Notes:

Notes:

SelMash Liepaja was called Krasny Metallurg.

=== Number of teams by republics ===
Number	Union republics	Team(s)
5	Belarusian SSR	FC Lokomotiv Gomel, FC Khimik Mogilyov, FC Krasnoye Znamya Vitebsk, FC Spartak Brest, FC Bobruisk
3	Georgian SSR	FC Lokomotiv Tbilisi, FC Ritsa Sukhumi, FC Dinamo Batumi
2	Armenian SSR	FC Shirak Leninakan, FC Lori Kirovakan
2	Latvian SSR	FC REZ Riga, FC SelMash Liepaja
2	Moldavian SSR	FC Nistrul Bendery, FC Pishchevik Tiraspol
1	Estonian SSR	SKF Tallinn
1	Lithuanian SSR	FK Banga Kaunas

=== II Zone ===
Pos	Rep	Team	Pld	W	D	L	GF	GA	GD	Pts
1	GEO	Torpedo Kutaisi	30	22	2	6	49	23	+26	46
2	KAZ	Shakhtyor Karaganda	30	17	9	4	56	23	+33	43
3	GEO	Metallurg Rustavi	30	17	7	6	45	33	+12	41
4	TKM	Kopet-Dag Ashkhabad	30	17	4	9	52	40	+12	38
5	ARM	Nairi Yerevan	30	16	5	9	55	38	+17	37
6	AZE	Textilshchik Kirovabad	30	16	3	11	43	43	0	35
7	TJK	Energetik Stalinabad	30	13	7	10	53	37	+16	33
8	KGZ	Alga Frunze	30	14	4	12	47	43	+4	32
9	KAZ	Metallurg Chimkent	30	10	10	10	54	53	+1	30
10	AZE	Temp Sumgait	30	10	7	13	40	50	−10	27
11	UZB	Start Tashkent	30	10	3	17	27	34	−7	23
12	TJK	Pamir Leninabad	30	9	4	17	42	53	−11	22
13	KAZ	Metallist Jambul	30	6	8	16	28	53	−25	20
14	UZB	Spartak Fergana	30	7	5	18	27	54	−27	19
15	UZB	Dinamo Samarkand	30	5	8	17	39	76	−37	18
16	AZE	Spartak Baku	30	7	2	21	22	26	−4	16

Source: rsssf.com
Notes:

Notes:

Nairi Yerevan was called Burevestnik.
Alga Frunze was called Spartak.
Metallurg Chimkent was called Yenbek.
Temp Sumgait was called Metallurg.
Start Tashkent was called Mehnat.

=== Number of teams by republics ===
Number	Union republics	Team(s)
3	Kazakh SSR	FC Shakhter Karaganda, FC Metallurg Chimkent, FC Metallist Jambul
3	Azerbaijan SSR	FC Textilshchik Kirovabad, FC Temp Sumgait, FC Spartak Baku
3	Uzbek SSR	FC Spartak Fergana, FC Start Tashkent, FC Dinamo Samarkand
2	Georgian SSR	FC Torpedo Kutaisi, FC Metallurg Rustavi
2	Tajik SSR	FC Energetik Dushanbe, FC Pamir Leninabad
1	Turkmen SSR	FC Kopet-Dag Ashkhabad
1	Armenian SSR	FC Nairi Yerevan
1	Kyrgyz SSR	FK Alga Frunze

=== Promotion/relegation Tournament ===
[Oct 25 – Nov 5, Kishinev] 

Pos	Rep	Team	Pld	W	D	L	GF	GA	GD	Pts	Promotion or relegation
1	GEO	Torpedo Kutaisi	4	3	0	1	7	4	+3	6	Promoted
2	EST	Kalev Tallinn	4	2	0	2	4	2	+2	4	Relegated
3	GEO	Lokomotiv Tbilisi	4	1	0	3	3	8	−5	2	

Source: rsssf.com

== See also ==
- Soviet First League
