= 1961 Soviet Cup =

1961 Cup of USSR in Football
Кубок СССР

Tournament details
- Country: Soviet Union
- Dates: May 9 – October 29
- Teams: 64 (final stage); 169 (total)

Final positions
- Champions: Shakhter Donetsk
- Runners-up: Torpedo Moscow

The 1961 Soviet Cup was an association football cup competition of the Soviet Union.

== Participating teams ==
Enter in First round	Enter in Qualification round		
Class A 22/22 teams	Class B 132/147 teams		
✓ Dinamo Kiev; ✓ Torpedo Moscow; ✓ Spartak Moscow; ✓ CSKA Moscow; ✓ Lokomotiv Moscow; ✓ Avangard Kharkov; ✓ Dinamo Tbilisi; ✓ Spartak Yerevan; ✓ SKA Rostov-na-Donu; ✓ Pakhtakor Tashkent; ✓ Dinamo Moscow; ✓ Shakhter Stalino; ✓ Zenit Leningrad; ✓ Admiralteyets Leningrad; ✓ Trud Voronezh; ✓ Moldova Kishenev; ✓ Kairat Alma-Ata; ✓ Neftianik Baku; ✓ Belarus Minsk; ✓ Spartak Vilnius; ✓ Daugava Riga; ✓ Kalev Tallinn	RSFSR I ✓ Volga Kalinin; ✓ Metallurg Cherepovets; ✓ Dinamo Leningrad; ✓ Shinnik Yaroslavl; ✓ Shakhter Stalinogorsk; ✓ Trud Tula; ✓ Spartak Leningrad; ✓ Tekstilschik Kostroma; ✓ Dinamo Bryansk; ✓ Sputnik Kaluga; ✓ Tralflotovets Murmansk; ✓ Onezhets Petrozavodsk; ✗ Ilmen Novgorod	RSFSR II ✓ Dinamo Kirov; ✓ Baltika Kaliningrad; ✓ Iskra Kazan; ✓ Zenit Izhevsk; ✓ Raketa Gorkiy; ✓ Torpedo Gorkiy; ✓ Tekstilschik Ivanovo; ✓ Znamia Truda Orekhovo-Zuyevo; ✓ Serpukhov; ✓ Trud Noginsk; ✓ Traktor Vladimir; ✓ Spartak Smolensk; ✗ Trud Kaliningrad	RSFSR III ✓ Krylya Sovetov Kuibyshev; ✓ Sokol Saratov; ✓ Traktor Stalingrad; ✓ Trudovye Rezervy Kursk; ✓ Spartak Ryazan; ✓ Torpedo Lipetsk; ✓ Energiya Volzhskiy; ✓ Zaria Penza; ✓ Spartak Tambov; ✓ Neftianik Syzran; ✓ Lokomotiv Oryol; ✓ Spartak Ulyanovsk; ✓ Tsementnik Belgorod
✓ Dinamo Kiev; ✓ Torpedo Moscow; ✓ Spartak Moscow; ✓ CSKA Moscow; ✓ Lokomotiv Moscow; ✓ Avangard Kharkov; ✓ Dinamo Tbilisi; ✓ Spartak Yerevan; ✓ SKA Rostov-na-Donu; ✓ Pakhtakor Tashkent; ✓ Dinamo Moscow; ✓ Shakhter Stalino; ✓ Zenit Leningrad; ✓ Admiralteyets Leningrad; ✓ Trud Voronezh; ✓ Moldova Kishenev; ✓ Kairat Alma-Ata; ✓ Neftianik Baku; ✓ Belarus Minsk; ✓ Spartak Vilnius; ✓ Daugava Riga; ✓ Kalev Tallinn	RSFSR IV ✓ Terek Grozny; ✓ Rostselmash Rostov-na-Donu; ✓ Torpedo Taganrog; ✓ Shakhter Shakhty; ✓ Torpedo Armavir; ✓ Spartak Stavropol; ✓ Tsement Novorossiysk; ✓ Dinamo Makhachkala; ✓ Spartak Ordzhonikidze; ✓ Trudovye Rezervy Kislovodsk; ✓ Spartak Nalchik; ✓ Volgar Astrakhan; ✗ Spartak Krasnodar	RSFSR V ✓ Lokomotiv Chelyabinsk; ✓ Uralmash Sverdlovsk; ✓ Stroitel Ufa; ✓ Lokomotiv Orenburg; ✓ Zvezda Perm; ✓ Metallurg Nizhniy Tagil; ✓ Irtysh Omsk; ✓ Stroitel Kurgan; ✓ Torpedo Pavlovo; ✓ Metallurg Magnitogorsk; ✓ Khimik Berezniki; ✓ Stroitel Saransk; ✓ Geolog Tyumen	RSFSR VI ✓ SKA Khabarovsk; ✓ SKA Novosibirsk; ✓ Luch Vladivostok; ✓ Temp Barnaul; ✓ Lokomotiv Krasnoyarsk; ✓ Tomich Tomsk; ✓ Angara Irkutsk; ✓ Avangard Komsomolsk-na-Amure; ✓ Baikal Ulan-Ude; ✓ Khimik Kemerovo; ✓ Amur Blagoveschensk; ✓ Metallurg Stalinsk; ✓ Zabaikalets Chita
✓ Dinamo Kiev; ✓ Torpedo Moscow; ✓ Spartak Moscow; ✓ CSKA Moscow; ✓ Lokomotiv Moscow; ✓ Avangard Kharkov; ✓ Dinamo Tbilisi; ✓ Spartak Yerevan; ✓ SKA Rostov-na-Donu; ✓ Pakhtakor Tashkent; ✓ Dinamo Moscow; ✓ Shakhter Stalino; ✓ Zenit Leningrad; ✓ Admiralteyets Leningrad; ✓ Trud Voronezh; ✓ Moldova Kishenev; ✓ Kairat Alma-Ata; ✓ Neftianik Baku; ✓ Belarus Minsk; ✓ Spartak Vilnius; ✓ Daugava Riga; ✓ Kalev Tallinn	UkrSSR I ✓ Chernomorets Odessa; ✓ Lokomotiv Vinnitsa; ✓ Zvezda Kirovograd; ✓ SKA Lvov; ✓ Desna Chernigov; ✓ Polesie Zhitomir; ✓ Sudostoitel Nikolayev; ✓ Dinamo Khmelnitskiy; ✓ Avangard Chernovtsy; ✓ Kolgospnik Rovno; ✓ Verkhovina Uzhgorod; ✓ Spartak Stanislav; ✓ Mayak Kherson; ✓ Avangard Ternopol; ✓ Arsenal Kiev; ✓ Kolgospnik Cherkassy; ✓ Neftianik Drogobich; ✓ Volyn Lutsk	UkrSSR II ✓ SKA Odessa; ✓ Avangard Zholtye Vody; ✓ Metallurg Zaporozhye; ✓ Avangard Simferopol; ✓ Shakhter Gorlovka; ✓ Khimik Severodonetsk; ✓ SKF Sevastopol; ✓ Kolgospnik Poltava; ✓ Avangard Sumy; ✓ Azovstal Zhdanov; ✓ SKA Kiev; ✓ Lokomotiv Stalino; ✓ Metallurg Dnepropetrovsk; ✓ Avangard Krivoi Rog; ✓ Shakhter Kadiyevka; ✓ Avangard Kramatorsk; ✓ Torpedo Kharkov; ✓ Khimik Dneprodzerzhinsk; ✗ Trudovye Rezervy Lugansk	Union republics I ✓ Khimik Mogilev; ✓ Lokomotiv Gomel; ✓ Spartak Brest; ✓ Lokomotiv Tbilisi; ✓ Krasnoye Znamia Vitebsk; ✓ Dinamo Batumi; ✓ Selmash Liyepaya; ✓ Nistrul Bendery; ✓ Ritsa Sukhumi; ✓ REZ Riga; ✗ Shirak Leninakan; ✗ Lori Kirovakan; ✗ Pischevik Tiraspol; ✗ SKF Tallinn; ✗ Banga Kaunas; ✗ Bobruisk
✓ Dinamo Kiev; ✓ Torpedo Moscow; ✓ Spartak Moscow; ✓ CSKA Moscow; ✓ Lokomotiv Moscow; ✓ Avangard Kharkov; ✓ Dinamo Tbilisi; ✓ Spartak Yerevan; ✓ SKA Rostov-na-Donu; ✓ Pakhtakor Tashkent; ✓ Dinamo Moscow; ✓ Shakhter Stalino; ✓ Zenit Leningrad; ✓ Admiralteyets Leningrad; ✓ Trud Voronezh; ✓ Moldova Kishenev; ✓ Kairat Alma-Ata; ✓ Neftianik Baku; ✓ Belarus Minsk; ✓ Spartak Vilnius; ✓ Daugava Riga; ✓ Kalev Tallinn	Union republics II ✓ Tekstilschik Kirovabad; ✓ Metallurg Chimkent; ✓ Start Tashkent; ✓ Dinamo Samarkand; ✓ Torpedo Kutaisi; ✓ Spartak Baku; ✓ Energetik Stalinabad; ✓ Kopet-Dag Ashkhabad; ✓ Spartak Fergana; ✓ Temp Sumgait; ✓ Metallurg Rustavi; ✗ Shakhter Karaganda; ✗ Nairi Yerevan; ✗ Alga Frunze; ✗ Pamir Leninabad; ✗ Metalist Jambul		

Source: []

== Competition schedule ==
=== Preliminary stage ===
==== Group 1 (Russian Federation) ====
===== Semifinals =====
METALLURG Cherepovets         2-1  Onezhets Petrozavodsk 
SHINNIK Yaroslavl             4-2  Sputnik Kaluga 
Trud Tula                     1-2  DINAMO Bryansk  
VOLGA Kalinin                 5-0  Dinamo Leningrad

===== Final =====
Dinamo Bryansk                0-1  METALLURG Cherepovets  
SPARTAK Leningrad             3-1  Tralflotovets Murmansk 
Textilshchik Kostroma         0-2  SHAKHTYOR Stalinogorsk 
Volga Kalinin                 0-0  Shinnik Yaroslavl

====== Final replays ======
VOLGA Kalinin                 3-2  Shinnik Yaroslavl             [aet]

==== Group 2 (Russian Federation) ====
===== Semifinals =====
Baltika Kaliningrad           1-1  Torpedo Gorkiy 
DINAMO Kirov                  5-2  Znamya Truda Orekhovo-Zuyevo  [aet] 
ISKRA Kazan                   2-0  Spartak Smolensk 
ZENIT Izhevsk                 3-0  Textilshchik Ivanovo

====== Semifinals replays ======
BALTIKA Kaliningrad           2-0  Torpedo Gorkiy

===== Final =====
BALTIKA Kaliningrad           3-0  Dinamo Kirov 
ISKRA Kazan                   2-0  Zenit Izhevsk 
MVO Serpukhov                 2-1  Trud Noginsk                  [aet] 
RAKETA Gorkiy                 2-0  Traktor Vladimir

==== Group 3 (Russian Federation) ====
===== Semifinals =====
ENERGIYA Volzhskiy            4-2  Lokomotiv Oryol 
Neftyanik Syzran              1-2  TRAKTOR Stalingrad 
SPARTAK Ryazan                2-0  Torpedo Lipetsk 
Spartak Ulyanovsk             1-1  Sokol Saratov 
Zarya Penza                   0-7  KRYLYA SOVETOV Kuibyshev

====== Semifinals replays ======
SPARTAK Ulyanovsk             4-2  Sokol Saratov

===== Final =====
ENERGIYA Volzhskiy            3-1  Spartak Ulyanovsk 
KRYLYA SOVETOV Kuibyshev      5-0  Spartak Tambov 
TRAKTOR Stalingrad            3-1  Spartak Ryazan 
TRUDOVIYE REZERVY Kursk       3-2  Cementnik Belgorod

==== Group 4 (Russian Federation) ====
===== Semifinals =====
SPARTAK Orjonikidze           2-0  Cement Novorossiysk 
Spartak Stavropol             1-1  Torpedo Armavir  
TORPEDO Taganrog              2-0  Terek Grozny 
VOLGAR Astrakhan              2-0  Trudoviye Rezervy Kislovodsk

====== Semifinals replays ======
Spartak Stavropol             0-1  TORPEDO Armavir

===== Final =====
SHAKHTYOR Shakhty             4-1  RostSelMash Rostov-na-Donu 
SPARTAK Nalchik               1-0  Dinamo Makhachkala 
Spartak Orjonikidze           0-1  TORPEDO Armavir  
TORPEDO Taganrog              1-0  Volgar Astrakhan

==== Group 5 (Russian Federation) ====
===== Semifinals =====
GEOLOG Tyumen                 3-1  Stroitel Saransk 
IRTYSH Omsk                   1-0  UralMash Sverdlovsk 
LOKOMOTIV Orenburg            3-1  Metallurg Magnitogorsk 
STROITEL Ufa                  2-0  Metallurg Nizhniy Tagil 
ZVEZDA Perm                   2-0  Stroitel Kurgan

===== Final =====
IRTYSH Omsk                   2-0  Geolog Tyumen                 [aet] 
KHIMIK Berezniki              2-1  Lokomotiv Chelyabinsk 
TORPEDO Pavlovo               2-0  Lokomotiv Orenburg 
Zvezda Perm                   3-5  STROITEL Ufa                  [aet]

==== Group 6 (Russian Federation) ====
===== Semifinals =====
AMUR Blagoveshchensk          4-2  Avangard Komsomolsk-na-Amure  [aet] 
SKA Khabarovsk                1-1  SKA Novosibirsk 
TEMP Barnaul                  1-0  Baykal Ulan-Ude 
TOMICH Tomsk                  3-1  Angara Irkutsk 
Zabaikalets Chita             1-1  Khimik Kemerovo

====== Semifinals replays ======
SKA Khabarovsk                2-0  SKA Novosibirsk 
Zabaikalets Chita             0-0  Khimik Kemerovo 
ZABAIKALETS Chita             3-2  Khimik Kemerovo

===== Final =====
AMUR Blagoveshchensk          2-1  Zabaikalets Chita 
LUCH Vladivostok              3-0  Lokomotiv Krasnoyarsk 
METALLURG Stalinsk            5-0  Temp Barnaul 
SKA Khabarovsk                2-0  Tomich Tomsk

==== Group 1 (Ukraine) ====
===== Semifinals =====
[Jun 8] 
ZVEZDA Kirovograd             2-1  Avangard Chernovtsy 
[Jun 10] 
CHERNOMORETS Odessa           3-2  Kolhospnik Rovno 
[Jun 11] 
Avangard Ternopol             1-2  SPARTAK Stanislav  
DESNA Chernigov               4-3  Neftyanik Drogobych 
KOLHOSPNIK Cherkassy          3-2  Sudostroitel Nikolayev 
Polesye Zhitomir              1-1  Dinamo Khmelnitskiy 
SKA Lvov                      2-0  Arsenal Kiev 
VERKHOVINA Uzhgorod           3-1  Volyn Lutsk

====== Semifinals replays ======
[Jun 12] 
Polesye Zhitomir              0-2  DINAMO Khmelnitskiy

===== Final =====
[May 9] 
LOKOMOTIV Vinnitsa            2-1  Mayak Kherson 
[Jun 21] 
Zvezda Kirovograd             2-3  CHERNOMORETS Odessa  
[Jun 30] 
SKA Lvov                      3-4  DINAMO Khmelnitskiy 
[Jul 2] 
KOLGOSPNIK Cherkassy          2-1  Verkhovina Uzhgorod 
Spartak Stanislav             0-0  Desna Chernigov

====== Final replays ======
SPARTAK Stanislav             1-0  Desna Chernigov

==== Group 2 (Ukraine) ====
===== Semifinals =====
[Jun 10] 
Avangard Krivoi Rog           2-2  Avangard Sumy 
AZOVSTAL Zhdanov              1-0  Metallurg Zaporozhye 
SKF Sevastopol                3-0  SKA Kiev 
[Jun 11] 
AVANGARD Simferopol           2-0  Shakhtyor Kadiyevka 
Kolgospnik Poltava            1-2  AVANGARD Kramatorsk  
Metallurg Dnepropetrovsk      1-2  LOKOMOTIV Stalino 
SKA Odessa                    0-1  AVANGARD Zholtyye Vody 
TORPEDO Kharkov               2-0  Shakhtyor Gorlovka

====== Semifinals replays ======
Avangard Krivoi Rog           2-3  AVANGARD Sumy

===== Final =====
[Jun 10] 
KHIMIK Severodonetsk          3-0  Khimik Dneprodzerzhinsk 
[Jun 18] 
SKF Sevastopol                1-0  Avangard Sumy 
[Jul 2] 
AVANGARD Kramatorsk           1-0  AzovStal Zhdanov              [aet] 
AVANGARD Simferopol           2-0  Torpedo Kharkov 
[Jul 4] 
Lokomotiv Stalino             0-1  AVANGARD Zholtyye Vody

==== Group 1 (Union republics) ====
===== Semifinals =====
Khimik Mogilyov               0-4  SPARTAK Brest 
Lokomotiv Gomel               0-3  LOKOMOTIV Tbilisi

===== Final =====
Krasnoye Znamya Vitebsk       2-2  Dinamo Batumi 
LOKOMOTIV Tbilisi             w/o  REZ Riga 
SelMash Liepaja               0-1  NISTRUL Bendery 
SPARTAK Brest                 w/o  Ritsa Sukhumi

====== Final replays ======
Krasnoye Znamya Vitebsk       1-1  Dinamo Batumi 
Krasnoye Znamya Vitebsk       3-6  DINAMO Batumi

==== Group 2 (Union republics) ====
===== Semifinals =====
START Tashkent                2-0  Dinamo Samarkand 
TEXTILSHCHIK Kirovabad        w/o  Metallurg Chimkent 
TORPEDO Kutaisi               3-0  Spartak Baku

===== Final =====
ENERGETIK Stalinabad          4-1  Kopet-Dag Ashkhabad 
Metallurg Rustavi             1-3  TORPEDO Kutaisi 
SPARTAK Fergana               1-0  Temp Sumgait 
START Tashkent                w/o  Textilshchik Kirovabad

=== Final stage ===
==== First round ====
[Jun 21] 
Luch Vladivostok              1-2  DINAMO Moskva 
  [G.Yepishin 7 – Genrikh Fedosov 9, Valeriy Korolenkov 82 pen] 
[Jun 23] 
ENERGETIK Stalinabad          5-1  Daugava Riga 
  [E.Astvatsaturov-3, B.Semyonov, V.Gurko - ?] 
[Jun 28] 
Chernomorets Odessa           1-2  DINAMO Kiev 
  [Nikolai Molochkov 15 – Valentin Troyanovskiy 9 pen, Yozhef Sabo 32] 
[Jun 30] 
Khimik Berezniki              1-2  SPARTAK Fergana 
Nistrul Bendery               0-4  KRYLYA SOVETOV Kuibyshev 
SPARTAK Leningrad             2-0  CSKA Moskva 
  [Makeyev 18, Vasilenko ?] 
Traktor Stalingrad            0-3  DINAMO Tbilisi 
  [Vladimir Barkaia, Shota Yamanidze, Ilya Datunashvili] 
[Jul 2] 
Lokomotiv Vinnitsa            0-1  SPARTAK Yerevan 
[Jul 15] 
AVANGARD Kramatorsk           1-0  Avangard Simferopol 
  [Dotsenko pen] 
Irtysh Omsk                   0-1  NEFTYANIK Baku 
RAKETA Gorkiy                 1-0  Moldova Kishinev 
TORPEDO Armavir               1-0  Avangard Zholtyye Vody 
Torpedo Kutaisi               0-1  KOLHOSPNIK Cherkassy 
  [Vulfovich] 
TORPEDO Pavlovo               2-1  Dinamo Batumi 
Volga Kalinin                 2-3  KALEV Tallinn 
[Jul 19] 
Metallurg Cherepovets         2-3  BELARUS Minsk 
  [? – Mikhail Mustygin, Vladimir Terekhov, Ivan Mozer] 
[Jul 22] 
Torpedo Taganrog              1-2  TORPEDO Moskva 
  [V.Fisenko – Gennadiy Gusarov-2] 
[Jul 23] 
Spartak Nalchik               0-2  SKA Rostov-na-Donu 
  [Vladimir Streshniy-2] 
[Jul 28] 
SKF Sevastopol                1-0  Spartak Vilnius 
  [Skripka] 
[Jul 30] 
Dinamo Khmelnitskiy           0-2  SHAKHTYOR Stalino 
  [Valentin Sapronov ?, Vitaliy Savelyev 68] 
[Aug 3] 
TRUDOVIYE REZERVY Kursk       3-1  Spartak Brest 
  [Val.Batin-2, S.Rybkin – V.Statsyuk] 
[Aug 4] 
ISKRA Kazan                   2-0  Trud Voronezh 
  [Anatoliy Kashurin, Leonid Dardymov] 
[Aug 9] 
SKA Khabarovsk                1-2  AVANGARD Kharkov 
  [V.Myazin – Nikolai Korolyov, Yuriy Nesterov] 
[Aug 15] 
Amur Blagoveshchensk          0-6  PAHTAKOR Tashkent 
Lokomotiv Tbilisi             0-1  LOKOMOTIV Moskva 
  [Viktor Voroshilov 25] 
METALLURG Stalinsk            1-0  Kayrat Alma-Ata               [aet] 
MVO Serpukhov                 1-0  Baltika Kaliningrad 
Shakhtyor Shakhty             1-4  ADMIRALTEYETS Leningrad 
SHAKHTYOR Stalinogorsk        1-0  Khimik Severodonetsk 
Spartak Stanislav             0-1  ENERGIYA Volzhskiy 
  [Suchilin] 
[Aug 19] 
Start Tashkent                0-0  Spartak Moskva 
[Aug 23] 
Stroitel Ufa                  0-2  ZENIT Leningrad 
  [Stanislav Zavidonov 19, Lev Burchalkin 87]

===== First round replays =====
[Aug 20] 
Start Tashkent                0-2  SPARTAK Moskva 
  [Galimzyan Husainov 15, Yuriy Sevidov 58]

==== Second round ====
[Aug 10] 
Energetik Stalinabad          1-2  SHAKHTYOR Stalinogorsk 
  [Khlebnikov – Buda-2] 
Spartak Fergana               0-3  SHAKHTYOR Stalino 
  [Yuriy Zakharov 38, 53, Valentin Sapronov ?] 
[Aug 14] 
Dinamo Moskva                 0-0  Iskra Kazan 
KRYLYA SOVETOV Kuibyshev      1-0  Belarus Minsk  
  [Anatoliy Kazakov] 
[Aug 20] 
Admiralteyets Leningrad       2-2  MVO Serpukhov 
  [? – Silkin-2] 
Energiya Volzhskiy            1-5  LOKOMOTIV Moskva 
  [Chirkov – Viktor Sokolov-3, Vyacheslav Spiridonov, Ivan Abramov] 
Spartak Yerevan               1-3  SKA Rostov-na-Donu 
  [Georgiy Shaginyan – A.Volchenkov-2, Vladimir Andriyenko] 
[Aug 23] 
SPARTAK Moskva                4-0  SKF Sevastopol 
  [Yuriy Sevidov-2, Galimzyan Husainov, Leonard Adamov] 
[Aug 26] 
TORPEDO Moskva                8-0  Trudoviye Rezervy Kursk 
  [Valentin Ivanov-3, Gennadiy Gusarov-3, Valentin Denisov, Oleg Sergeyev] 
[Sep 9] 
Kolhospnik Cherkassy          0-1  ZENIT Leningrad 
  [Vyacheslav Krotkov 18] 
METALLURG Stalinsk            3-0  Pahtakor Tashkent 
NEFTYANIK Baku                2-1  Kalev Tallinn 
  [Robert Chanchaleishvili, Vyacheslav Semiglazov – Arvo Tamkirv] 
SPARTAK Leningrad             6-0  Torpedo Armavir 
TORPEDO Pavlovo               3-0  Raketa Gorkiy 
[Sep 11] 
DINAMO Kiev                   3-2  Avangard Kramatorsk           [aet] 
  [Oleg Bazilevich 75, ?, Vasiliy Turyanchik 87 – Dotsenko 45, Drygala 83] 
[Sep 23] 
DINAMO Tbilisi                2-1  Avangard Kharkov 
  [Tengiz Melashvili 73, Mikhail Meskhi 80 – Yuriy Nesterov 88]

===== Second round replays =====
[Aug 15] 
DINAMO Moskva                 8-0  Iskra Kazan 
  [Igor Chislenko 15, Valeriy Fadeyev 22, Viktor Anichkin 29, 63, Valeriy Korolenkov 52, 83, Kazhurin (I) 57 og, Arkadiy Nikolayev 87] 
[Aug 21] 
ADMIRALTEYETS Leningrad       3-2  MVO Serpukhov 
  [Yuriy Varlamov-2, Sergei Sogomonyants – Feflov, Oreshnikov]

==== Third round ====
[Aug 20] 
SHAKHTYOR Stalinogorsk        2-0  Dinamo Moskva 
  [Plekhanov 41, Lopukhin 67] 
[Aug 25] 
LOKOMOTIV Moskva              4-0  Metallurg Stalinsk 
  [Ivan Abramov 5, Vyacheslav Simeoshin 23, Viktor Sokolov 51, 70] 
[Sep 12] 
TORPEDO Moskva                3-0  Spartak Leningrad 
  [Valentin Ivanov-2, Slava Metreveli] 
[Sep 23] 
ADMIRALTEYETS Leningrad       2-1  Dinamo Kiev 
  [Vladimir Vinogradov 25, Eduard Belkin 63 – Vladimir Levchenko 69] 
[Oct 3] 
ZENIT Leningrad               3-0  Krylya Sovetov Kuibyshev 
  [Vadim Khrapovitskiy 31, 49, Nikolai Ryazanov 33] 
[Oct 8] 
SHAKHTYOR Stalino             3-2  Dinamo Tbilisi 
  [Yuriy Zakharov 33, 76, Yuriy Ananchenko 54 – Zaur Kaloyev 10, Mikhail Meskhi 53] 
SKA Rostov-na-Donu            2-2  Spartak Moskva 
  [Gennadiy Matveyev 9, Vladimir Streshniy 88 – Leonard Adamov 47, Galimzyan Husainov 57 pen] 
Torpedo Pavlovo               0-0  Neftyanik Baku

===== Third round replays =====
[Oct 9] 
SKA Rostov-na-Donu            2-0  Spartak Moskva 
  [Yuriy Mosalyov 17, 73] 
Torpedo Pavlovo               1-3  NEFTYANIK Baku 
  [Belov – Adamas Golodets, Yuriy Kuznetsov, Kyamil Eynullayev]

==== Quarterfinals ====
[Oct 9] 
Lokomotiv Moskva              0-1  ADMIRALTEYETS Leningrad 
  [Valentin Gusev 31] 
[Oct 14] 
SKA Rostov-na-Donu            2-3  TORPEDO Moskva 
  [Viktor Ponedelnik 73, Gennadiy Matveyev 85 – Gennadiy Gusarov 12, Valentin Ivanov 32, Valentin Denisov 66] 
[Oct 17] 
ZENIT Leningrad               2-1  Neftyanik Baku                [aet] 
  [Vasiliy Danilov, Nikolai Ryazanov (ot) – Yuriy Kuznetsov] 
[Oct 18] 
SHAKHTYOR Stalino             3-1 Shakhtyor Stalinogorsk 
  [Yuriy Ananchenko 26, 90, Valentin Sapronov 69 – V.Plekhanov 80 pen]

==== Semifinals ====
[Oct 25, Moskva] 
SHAKHTYOR Stalino             3-0  Admiralteyets Leningrad  
  [Oleg Kolosov 34, Yuriy Zakharov 68, 73] 
[Oct 26] 
TORPEDO Moskva                2-0  Zenit Leningrad 
  [Valentin Ivanov 6, Slava Metreveli 63]

==== Final ====
29 October 1961

Torpedo Moscow	1 – 3	Shakhter Stalino
Metreveli 45'	[ Report]	Rodin 1'; Ananchenko 65', 70'

Moscow
