= 1962 Soviet Class B =

Soviet Class B
- Season: 1962

1962 Soviet Class B was the 13th season of the Soviet Class B football competitions since their establishment in 1950. It was also the 22nd season of what eventually became known as the Soviet First League.

== Russian Federation ==
=== I Zone ===
Pos	Team	Pld	W	D	L	GF	GA	GD	Pts
1	Shinnik Yaroslavl	32	21	8	3	76	20	+56	50
2	Spartak Leningrad	32	21	5	6	56	20	+36	47
3	Textilshchik Ivanovo	32	16	10	6	54	29	+25	42
4	Znamya Truda Orekhovo-Zuyevo	32	16	9	7	51	33	+18	41
5	Vympel Kaliningrad (M.R.) (Note: Vympel Kaliningrad was called Trud.)	32	17	7	8	50	32	+18	41
6	Raketa Sormovo (Note: Raketa Gorkiy relocated to Sormovo.)	32	13	12	7	42	23	+19	38
7	Textilshchik Kostroma	32	12	8	12	37	37	0	32
8	Khimik Novomoskovsk (Note: Khimik Novomoskovsk was called Shakhtyor Stalinogorsk (with change of the city's name).)	32	10	11	11	40	31	+9	31
9	SKA Leningrad	32	11	8	13	38	46	−8	30
10	Shakhtyor Tula (Note: Shakhtyor Tula was called Trud.)	32	11	8	13	32	45	−13	30
11	Volga Kalinin	32	9	12	11	25	38	−13	30
12	Metallurg Cherepovets	32	8	11	13	30	46	−16	27
13	Dinamo Bryansk	32	7	10	15	32	43	−11	24
14	Volna Dzerzhinsk	32	8	8	16	18	38	−20	24
15	Tralflotovets Murmansk	32	6	10	16	25	52	−27	22
16	Sputnik Kaluga	32	4	12	16	26	45	−19	20
17	Onezhets Petrozavodsk	32	5	5	22	21	75	−54	15

=== II Zone ===
Pos	Team	Pld	W	D	L	GF	GA	GD	Pts
1	Trud Voronezh	30	19	8	3	58	23	+35	46
2	Trudoviye Rezervy Kursk	30	16	11	3	45	19	+26	43
3	MVO Serpukhov	30	17	9	4	42	19	+23	43
4	Trud Noginsk	30	16	6	8	35	29	+6	38
5	Sokol Saratov	30	13	8	9	58	41	+17	34
6	Baltika Kaliningrad	30	10	13	7	31	25	+6	33
7	Chaika Gorkiy (Note: Chaika Gorkiy was called Torpedo.)	30	8	16	6	34	30	+4	32
8	Spartak Ryazan	30	11	8	11	39	38	+1	30
9	Zarya Penza	30	10	8	12	31	35	−4	28
10	Torpedo Lipetsk	30	8	11	11	40	37	+3	27
11	Traktor Vladimir	30	8	9	13	26	34	−8	25
12	Torpedo Pavlovo	30	7	10	13	44	58	−14	24
13	Spartak Tambov	30	8	5	17	31	52	−21	21
14	Spartak Smolensk	30	7	6	17	38	54	−16	20
15	Lokomotiv Oryol	30	6	7	17	25	54	−29	19
16	Spartak Saransk (Note: Spartak Saransk was called Stroitel.)	30	4	9	17	29	58	−29	17

=== III Zone ===
Pos	Team	Pld	W	D	L	GF	GA	GD	Pts
1	Spartak Krasnodar	28	17	7	4	59	25	+34	41
2	Traktor Volgograd (Note: The city of Stalingrad was renamed to Volgograd.)	28	15	9	4	43	15	+28	39
3	RostSelMash Rostov-na-Donu	28	17	4	7	66	31	+35	38
4	Dinamo Stavropol (Note: Dinamo Stavropol was called Spartak.)	28	15	6	7	40	26	+14	36
5	Shakhtyor Shakhty	28	13	7	8	39	27	+12	33
6	Torpedo Taganrog	28	11	9	8	38	25	+13	31
7	Terek Grozny	28	11	8	9	27	35	−8	30
8	Spartak Orjonikidze	28	10	6	12	38	36	+2	26
9	Energiya Volzhskiy	28	10	5	13	31	39	−8	25
10	Dinamo Makhachkala	28	8	8	12	21	39	−18	24
11	Spartak Nalchik	28	8	7	13	30	39	−9	23
12	Torpedo Armavir	28	9	5	14	30	42	−12	23
13	Cement Novorossiysk	28	7	9	12	27	41	−14	23
14	Trudoviye Rezervy Kislovodsk	28	8	4	16	21	47	−26	20
15	Volgar Astrakhan	28	1	6	21	16	59	−43	8

=== IV Zone ===
Pos	Team	Pld	W	D	L	GF	GA	GD	Pts
1	UralMash Sverdlovsk	30	19	7	4	66	28	+38	45
2	Lokomotiv Chelyabinsk	30	17	6	7	61	27	+34	40
3	Iskra Kazan	30	13	12	5	47	23	+24	38
4	Stroitel Ufa	30	15	6	9	51	35	+16	36
5	Dinamo Kirov	30	13	9	8	50	26	+24	35
6	Zvezda Perm	30	13	9	8	49	33	+16	35
7	Zenit Izhevsk	30	13	9	8	36	27	+9	35
8	Neftyanik Syzran	30	11	10	9	34	28	+6	32
9	Uralets Nizhniy Tagil (Note: Uralets Nizhniy Tagil was called Metallurg.)	30	11	8	11	43	36	+7	30
10	Stroitel Kurgan	30	10	8	12	30	39	−9	28
11	Metallurg Magnitogorsk	30	10	7	13	41	43	−2	27
12	Lokomotiv Orenburg	30	8	11	11	36	51	−15	27
13	Volga Ulyanovsk (Note: Volga Ulyanovsk was called Spartak.)	30	6	12	12	28	43	−15	24
14	Geolog Tyumen	30	6	9	15	22	50	−28	21
15	Trud Yoshkar-Ola	30	5	9	16	20	54	−34	19
16	Khimik Berezniki	30	2	4	24	19	90	−71	8

=== V Zone ===
Pos	Team	Pld	W	D	L	GF	GA	GD	Pts
1	SKA Novosibirsk	28	17	6	5	53	23	+30	40
2	SKA Khabarovsk	28	17	6	5	45	27	+18	40
3	Luch Vladivostok	28	14	8	6	42	33	+9	36
4	Khimik Kemerovo	28	11	11	6	41	20	+21	33
5	Temp Barnaul	28	14	3	11	51	34	+17	31
6	Lokomotiv Krasnoyarsk	28	13	5	10	48	34	+14	31
7	Irtysh Omsk	28	13	4	11	39	28	+11	30
8	Angara Irkutsk	28	10	9	9	39	34	+5	29
9	Zabaikalets Chita	28	7	13	8	40	41	−1	27
10	Shakhtyor Prokopyevsk	28	10	6	12	29	43	−14	26
11	Avangard Komsomolsk-na-Amure	28	8	9	11	35	33	+2	25
12	Baykal Ulan-Ude	28	5	13	10	24	41	−17	23
13	Tomich Tomsk	28	6	8	14	22	40	−18	20
14	Amur Blagoveshchensk	28	6	4	18	27	57	−30	16
15	Metallurg Novokuznetsk (Note: The city of Stalinsk was renamed to Novokuznetsk.)	28	2	9	17	22	69	−47	13

=== Final ===
[Krasnodar, Oct 27 – Nov 9]

Pos	Team	Pld	W	D	L	GF	GA	GD	Pts
1	Spartak Krasnodar	4	3	1	0	7	2	+5	7
2	Trud Voronezh	4	3	0	1	7	2	+5	6
3	UralMash Sverdlovsk	4	1	2	1	3	5	−2	4
4	SKA Novosibirsk	4	1	1	2	1	4	−3	4 (Note: 1 bonus point awarded?)
5	Shinnik Yaroslavl	4	0	0	4	1	6	−5	0

== Ukraine ==
=== For places 1-6 ===
Pos	Team	Pld	W	D	L	GF	GA	GD	Pts
1	Trudoviye Rezervy Lugansk	10	6	4	0	22	11	+11	16
2	Chernomorets Odessa	10	4	3	3	13	9	+4	11
3	Avangard Simferopol	10	3	4	3	12	14	−2	10
4	SKA Odessa	10	3	2	5	11	10	+1	8
5	Polesye Zhitomir	10	3	2	5	10	15	−5	8
6	Metallurg Zaporozhye	10	1	5	4	13	22	−9	7

== Union republics ==
=== I Zone ===
Pos	Rep	Team	Pld	W	D	L	GF	GA	GD	Pts
1	BLR	Lokomotiv Gomel	32	18	10	4	43	19	+24	46
2	ARM	Shirak Leninakan	32	16	11	5	45	27	+18	43
3	ARM	Nairi Yerevan	32	17	8	7	51	29	+22	42
4	BLR	Spartak Brest	32	15	9	8	39	25	+14	39
5	GEO	Lokomotiv Tbilisi	32	12	14	6	52	32	+20	38
6	BLR	Khimik Mogilyov	32	13	10	9	35	32	+3	36
7	BLR	SKA Minsk	32	13	9	10	27	25	+2	35
8	GEO	Dinamo Sukhumi (Note: Dinamo Sukhumi was called Ritsa.)	32	10	12	10	36	33	+3	32
9	EST	Kalev Tallinn	32	10	11	11	35	31	+4	31
10	AZE	Neftyanyye Kamni Baku	32	10	11	11	39	43	−4	31
11	LVA	Zvejnieks Liepaja (Note: Zvejnieks Liepaja was called SelMash.)	32	6	18	8	29	31	−2	30
12	LTU	Banga Kaunas	32	10	8	14	32	31	+1	28
13	LVA	REZ Riga	32	7	10	15	34	46	−12	24
14	MDA	Nistrul Bendery	32	8	8	16	30	42	−12	24
15	BLR	Krasnoye Znamya Vitebsk	32	9	6	17	24	40	−16	24
16	MDA	Pishchevik Tiraspol	32	7	9	16	31	52	−21	23
17	EST	Dinamo Tallinn	32	6	4	22	26	70	−44	16

=== Number of teams by republics ===
Number	Union republics	Team(s)
5	Belarusian SSR	FC Lokomotiv Gomel, FC Spartak Brest, FC Khimik Mogilyov, SKA Minsk, FC Krasnoye Znamya Vitebsk
2	Armenian SSR	FC Shirak Leninakan, FC Nairi Yerevan
2	Georgian SSR	FC Lokomotiv Tbilisi, FC Dinamo Sukhumi
2	Estonian SSR	FC Kalev Tallinn, FC Dinamo Tallinn
2	Latvian SSR	FC Zvejnieks Liepaja, FC REZ Riga
2	Moldavian SSR	FC Nistrul Bendery, FC Pishchevik Tiraspol
1	Azerbaijan SSR	FC Neftyanyye Kamni Baku
1	Lithuanian SSR	FK Banga Kaunas

=== II Zone ===
Pos	Rep	Team	Pld	W	D	L	GF	GA	GD	Pts
1	KAZ	Shakhtyor Karaganda	28	19	3	6	53	21	+32	41
2	KGZ	Alga Frunze	28	12	9	7	45	32	+13	33
3	AZE	Dinamo Kirovabad (Note: Dinamo Kirovabad was called Textilshchik.)	28	11	10	7	36	26	+10	32
4	TKM	Stroitel Ashkhabad (Note: Stroitel Ashkhabad was called Kopet-Dag.)	28	11	8	9	41	37	+4	30
5	KAZ	Metallurg Chimkent	28	11	8	9	45	42	+3	30
6	TJK	Energetik Dushanbe (Note: The city of Stalinabad was renamed as Dushanbe.)	28	8	14	6	36	33	+3	30
7	GEO	Dinamo Batumi	28	10	10	8	34	33	+1	30
8	UZB	Neftyanik Fergana (Note: Neftyanik Fergana was called Spartak.)	28	10	9	9	33	40	−7	29
9	GEO	Metallurg Rustavi	28	7	14	7	41	33	+8	28
10	TJK	Pamir Leninabad	28	10	6	12	48	40	+8	26
11	ARM	Lori Kirovakan	28	9	8	11	37	36	+1	26
12	UZB	Pahtakor Tashkent Region	28	9	7	12	39	43	−4	25
13	GEO	Kolkhida Poti	28	5	11	12	29	38	−9	21
14	UZB	Khimik Chirchik	28	6	9	13	26	62	−36	21
15	KAZ	Metallist Jambul	28	5	8	15	22	49	−27	18

Source: rsssf.com

=== Number of teams by republics ===
Number	Union republics	Team(s)
3	Kazakh SSR	FC Shakhter Karaganda, FC Metallurg Chimkent, FC Metallist Jambul
3	Georgian SSR	FC Dinamo Batumi, FC Metallurg Rustavi, FC Kolkhida Poti
3	Uzbek SSR	FC Neftyanik Fergana, FC Pakhtakor Tashkent Region, FC Khimik Chirchik
2	Tajik SSR	FC Energetik Dushanbe, FC Pamir Leninabad
1	Kyrgyz SSR	FK Alga Frunze
1	Azerbaijan SSR	FC Dinamo Kirovabad
1	Turkmen SSR	FC Stroitel Ashkhabad
1	Armenian SSR	FC Lori Kirovakan

=== Final ===
[Oct 31, Nov 4, Odessa] 

- Shakhtyor Karaganda 1-0 0-0 Lokomotiv Gomel

== See also ==
- Soviet First League
