= USS Blue Ridge (LCC-19) =

United States Navy amphibious warfare command vessel

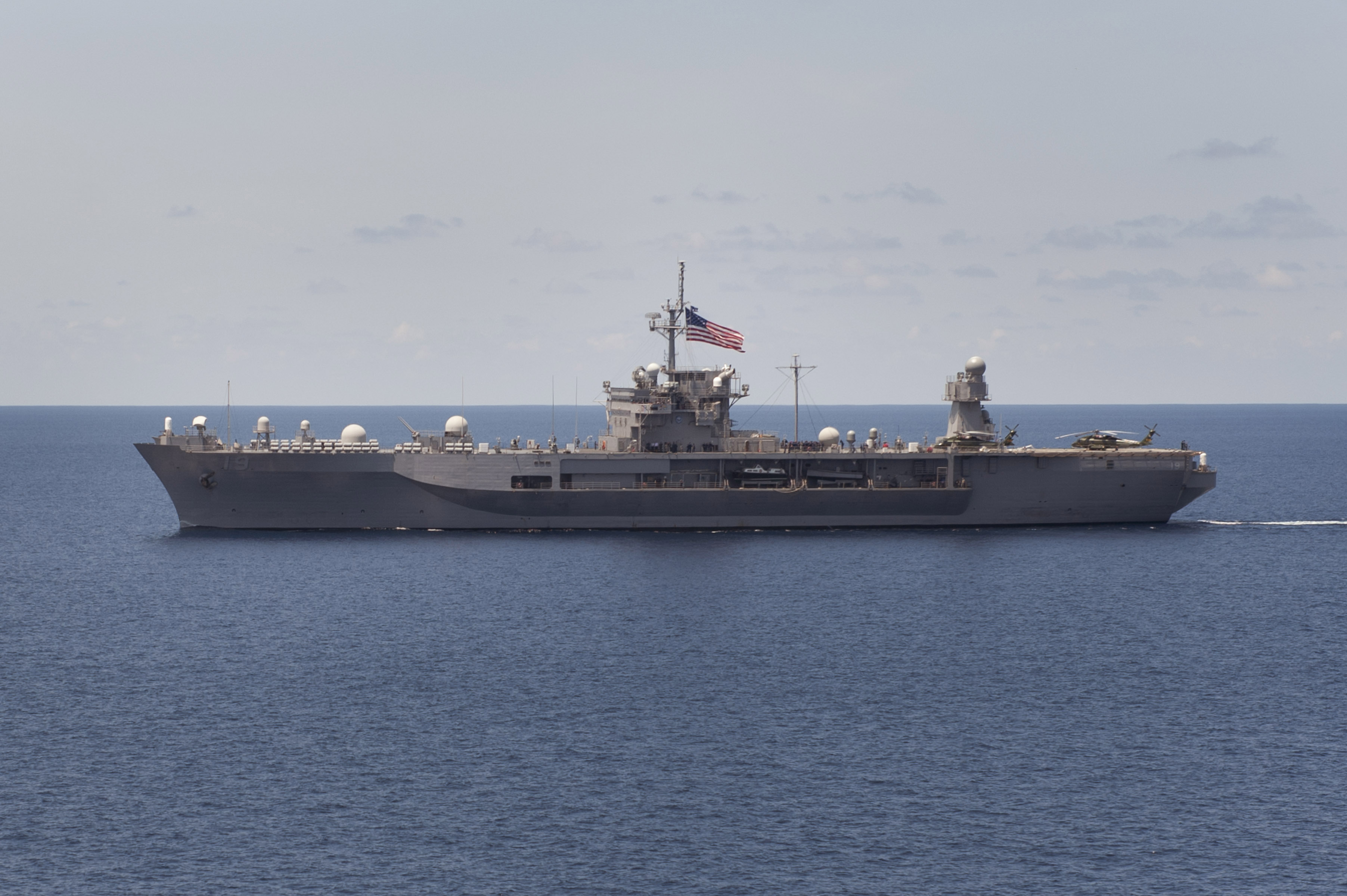
- USS Blue Ridge (LCC-19)

History

United States
- Name: Blue Ridge
- Namesake: Blue Ridge Mountains
- Ordered: 31 December 1964
- Builder: Philadelphia Naval Shipyard
- Laid down: 27 February 1967
- Launched: 4 January 1969
- Sponsored by: Mrs. Gretchen Thompson-Byrd
- Commissioned: 14 November 1970
- Home port: Yokosuka, Japan
- Identification: Hull number: LCC-19; Callsign: NQHS; MMSI number: 369970669
- Motto: Finest in the Fleet
- Status: In active service
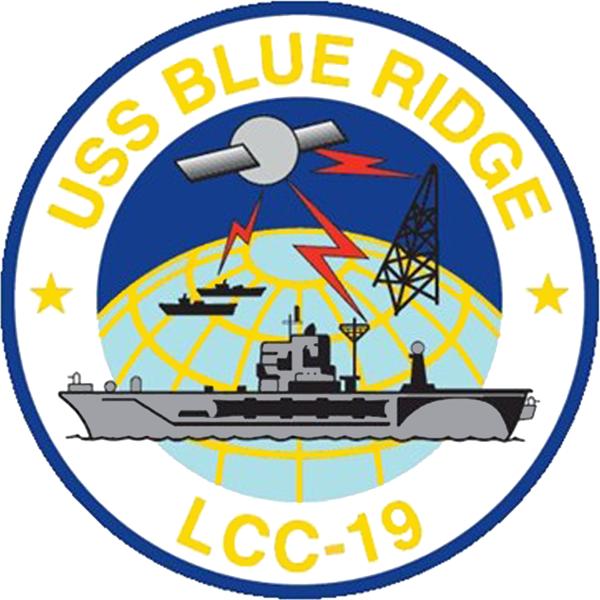
- Badge

General characteristics
- Class & type: Blue Ridge-class command ship
- Displacement: 19,609 tons
- Length: 634 ft (193.2 m)
- Beam: 108 ft (32.9 m)
- Draft: 28.9 ft (8.8 m)
- Propulsion: 2 boilers, 1 geared turbine
- Speed: 23 knots (43 km/h)
- Range: 10,000 nmi (18,520 km)
- Complement: Crew: 52 officers, 790 enlisted; With command staff: 268 officers, 1,173 enlisted
- Armament: 2 × Phalanx CIWS; 2 × 25 mm Bushmaster cannons; 8 × .50 cal (12.7 mm) M2 Browning machine guns; Mark 36 SRBOC chaff rockets
- Aircraft carried: 2 × Sikorsky SH-60 Seahawk helicopters
- Aviation facilities: Flight deck

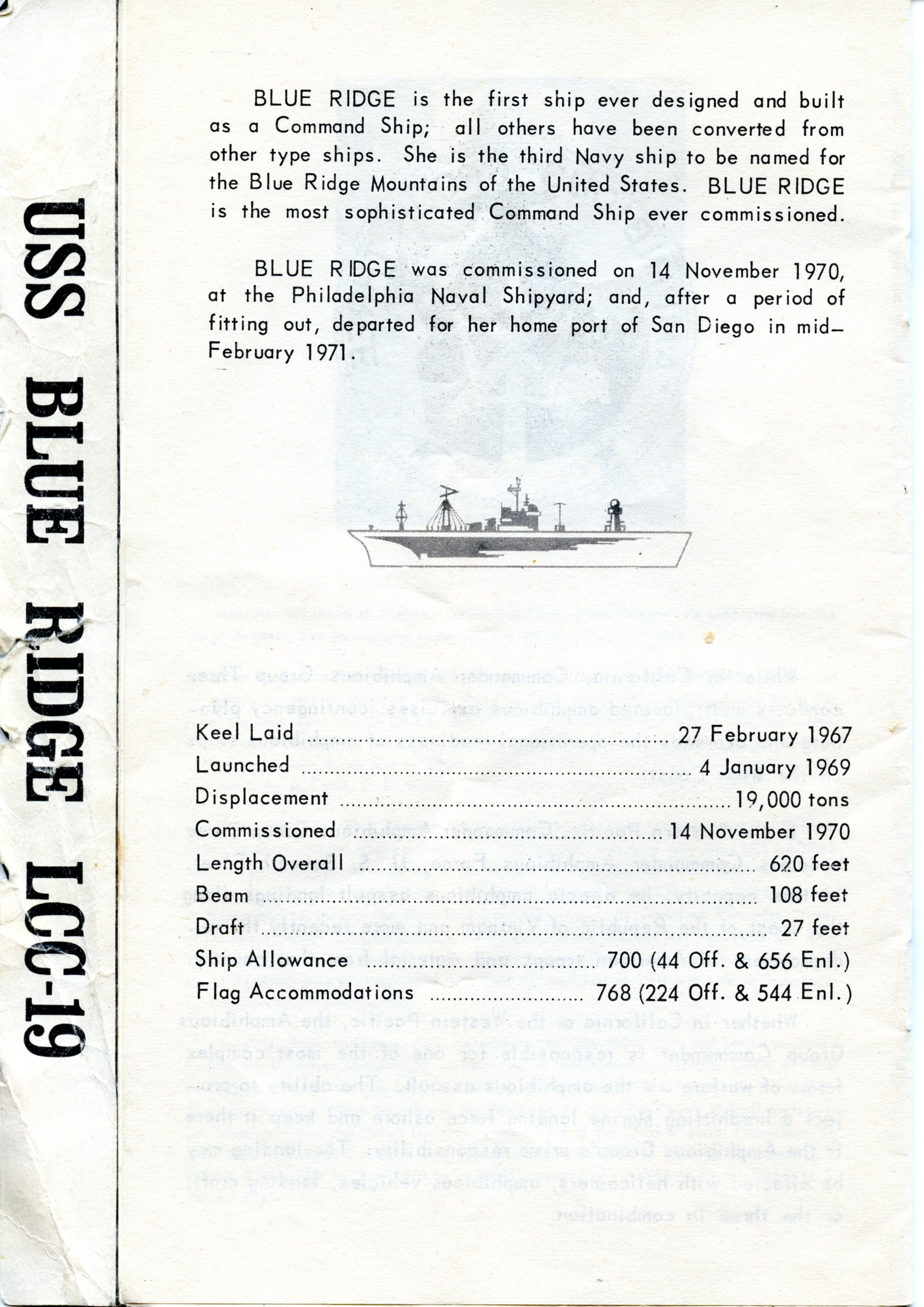
Original specifications

USS Blue Ridge (LCC-19) is the lead ship of the two Blue Ridge-class amphibious command ships of the United States Navy, and is the third Navy ship named after the Blue Ridge Mountains, a range of mountains in the Appalachian Mountains of the eastern United States.

As flagship of the Seventh Fleet, she continues in the role of her predecessor, USS Blue Ridge (AGC-2), in providing command, control, communications, computers, and intelligence (C4I) support to the commander and staff of the Fleet. She is currently forward-deployed to U.S. Navy Fleet Activities, Yokosuka in Japan. Blue Ridge is the oldest deployed warship of the U.S. Navy, following the decommissioning of USS Denver. Blue Ridge, as the U.S. Navy's active commissioned ship having the longest total period as active, flies the First Navy Jack instead of the jack of the United States. Blue Ridge is expected to remain in service until 2039.

== History ==
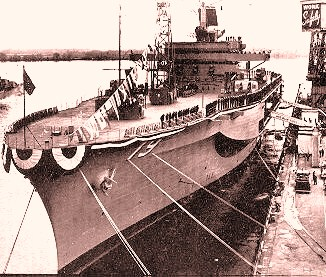
Commissioning on 14 November 1970

Blue Ridge was put "in commission special" on 14 November 1970, at the Philadelphia Naval Shipyard as an Amphibious Command and Control (LCC) ship, with Captain Kent J. Carroll as the commanding officer. The ship was sponsored by Mrs. Gretchen Byrd, wife of the U.S. Senator from Virginia, Harry F. Byrd Jr. The principal speaker at the ceremony was John W. Warner, Under Secretary of the Navy and later Senator from Virginia.

Blue Ridge was the replacement for USS Estes, but Estes was decommissioned earlier than planned in October 1969 due to the budget cuts of the late 1960s.

Blue Ridge was the lead ship of her class and represented almost seven years of planning and construction work. The result was a ship specifically designed from the keel up as a command and control ship. As designed, Blue Ridge was capable of supporting the staff of both the Commander of an Amphibious Task Force and the staff of the Commanding General of the Landing Force. The advanced computer system, extensive communications package and modern surveillance and detection systems was molded into the most advanced joint amphibious command and control center ever constructed.

The "First Navy Jack"; Blue Ridge flies it in place of the U.S. naval jack as she is the oldest actively commissioned warship in U.S. service.

At the time of her commissioning, Blue Ridge joined her sister ship Mount Whitney as having the distinction of carrying the world's most sophisticated electronics suites, which were said to be some thirty percent larger than that of the aircraft carrier USS John F. Kennedy, which had been the most complex. Blue Ridge was armed with a "main battery" of computers, communications gear, and other electronic facilities to fulfill her mission as a command ship. An extremely refined communications system was also an integral part of the ship's radical new design. Through an automated patch panel and computer controlled switching matrix her crew could use any combination of communication equipment desired. The clean topside area is the result of careful design intended to minimize the ship's interference with her own communications system. U.S. Navy long-range communications were heavily reliant on high frequency radio systems in the 1970s and have evolved to predominantly satellite communications in the 2000s. This is illustrated by the long wire antennas and the directional HF yagi or log-periodic antenna initially installed on Blue Ridge and later removed and replaced with a number of satellite communications antennas.

Besides small arms, Blue Ridge was armed with two twin Mark 33 3"/50 caliber guns at commissioning, though they have since been removed. She also carried two Mark 25 launchers and electronics for the Basic Point Defense Missile System (BPDMS) which was added sometime in the 1970s and removed in the 1990s. Two 20 mm Phalanx CIWS systems were added in the 1980s for point defense. In recent years she has also carried 25 mm Bushmaster cannons.

=== 1971 ===
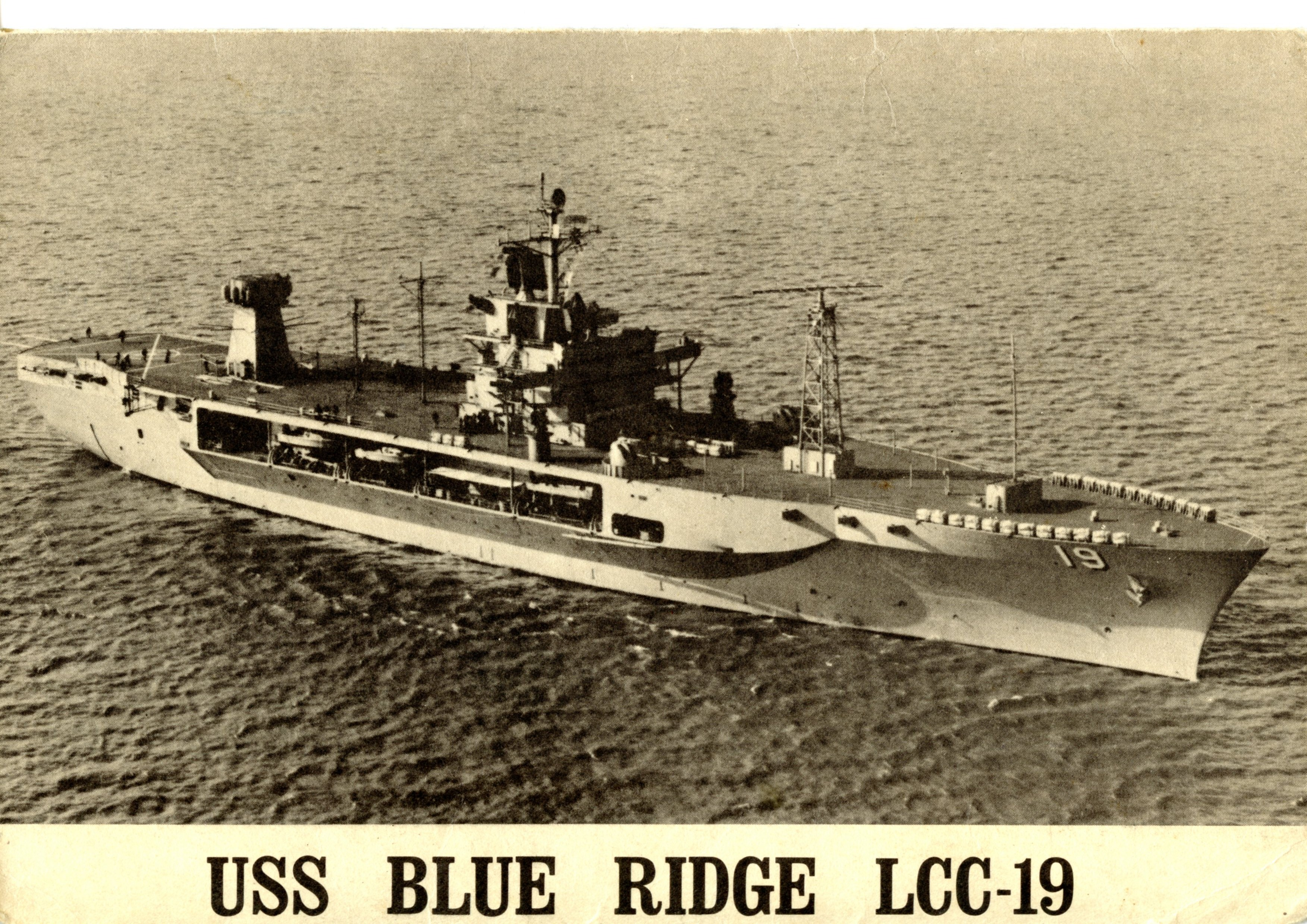
First INSURV, North Atlantic, January 1971

In late January 1971, the ship conducted her first INSURV in the North Atlantic, after transiting the Delaware River, from and return to Philadelphia.

On 11 February 1971, Blue Ridge steamed on her maiden voyage from the shipyard to the ship's first homeport, San Diego, California, around South America via the Strait of Magellan, making liberty calls at Norfolk, Virginia (15 February), Rio de Janeiro (4–6 March), Lima (20–22 March), Rodman Naval Station, Panama Canal Zone (27–28 March), and Acapulco (2–5 April). Blue Ridge's beam is 108 feet (33 m), but the Panama Canal locks at that time were only 110 feet (34 m), creating problems for the Blue Ridge-class of ships with fenders and barges for the sponsons.

As the ship crossed the equator on 26 February at 38 degrees and 24 minutes longitude, bound for Rio de Janeiro, Blue Ridge performed her first crossing the line ceremony, initiating the "wog" majority of the crew, except for one.

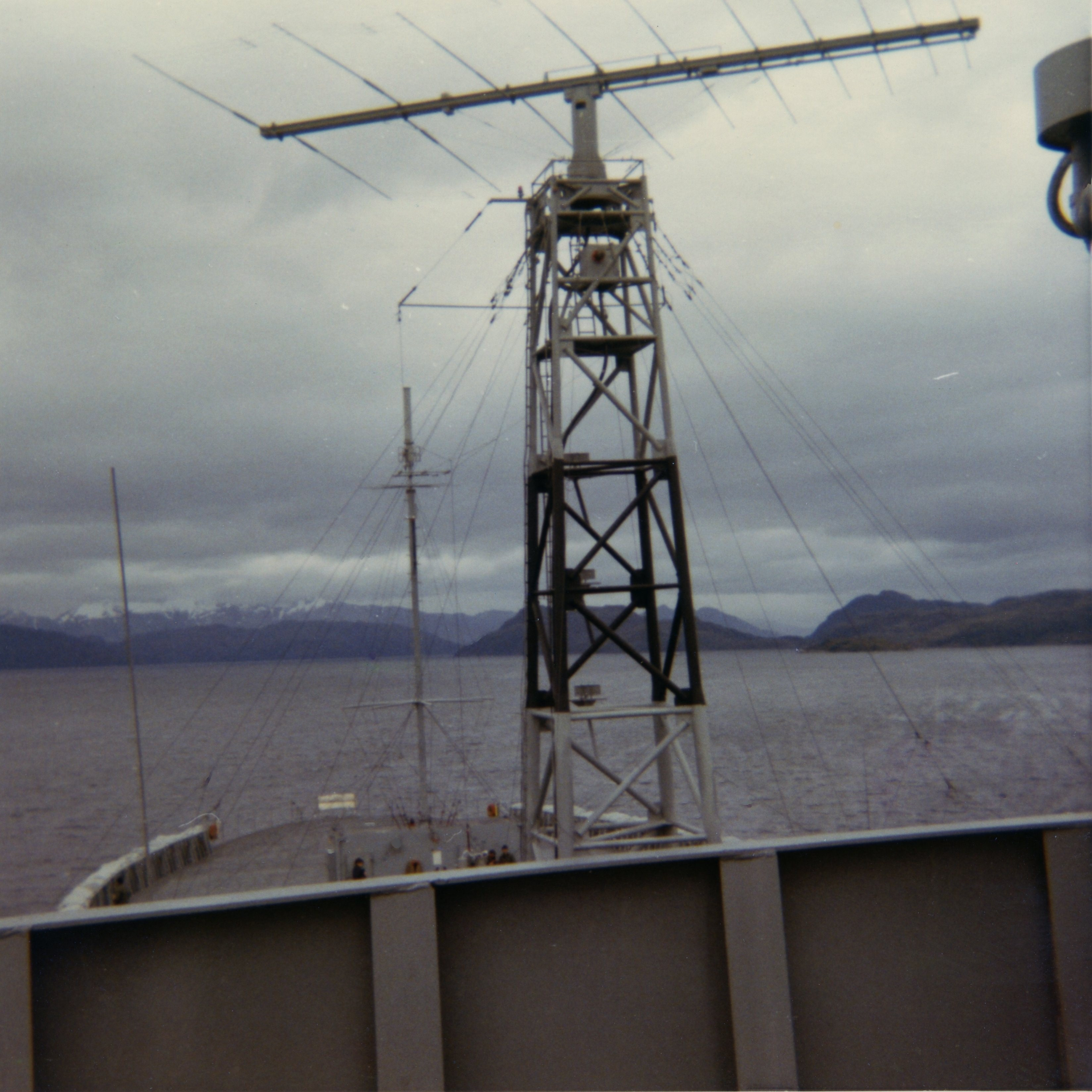
Blue Ridge transiting the Strait of Magellan in March 1971

Upon entry to the Strait of Magellan, Blue Ridge took on a passage pilot from the Chilean Navy for the transit. The Chilean patrol boat lost its mast and damaged one of Blue Ridge's basket antennas, just aft of the port sponson, in the boarding operation.

In Blue Ridge's transit from Lima to Rodman Naval Station, Panama, she was assigned the duty of going to the aid of any U.S. tuna fishing boat being harassed or captured by the Ecuadorian Navy because they were fishing in a claimed 200 miles (320 km) fishing zone that the U.S. did not recognize. This was known as the Tuna War, but no incident occurred.

Blue Ridge arrived at San Diego on 9 April, with Rear Admiral David M. Rubel, U.S. Navy, Commander Amphibious Group Three and staff embarked. Rear Admiral Rubel is the first Flag Officer embarked on Blue Ridge. Amphibious Group Three staff came aboard Blue Ridge at the Rodman port call with the next port call being Acapulco.

The rest of the year was highlighted by Command Post Exercises 3–7 May and 11–13 August. Refresher training was conducted in late June and early July. Blue Ridge acted as amphibious task force and landing force flagship for the major amphibious training exercise of the year, ROPEVAL WESTCO (3-71), from 8–16 September.

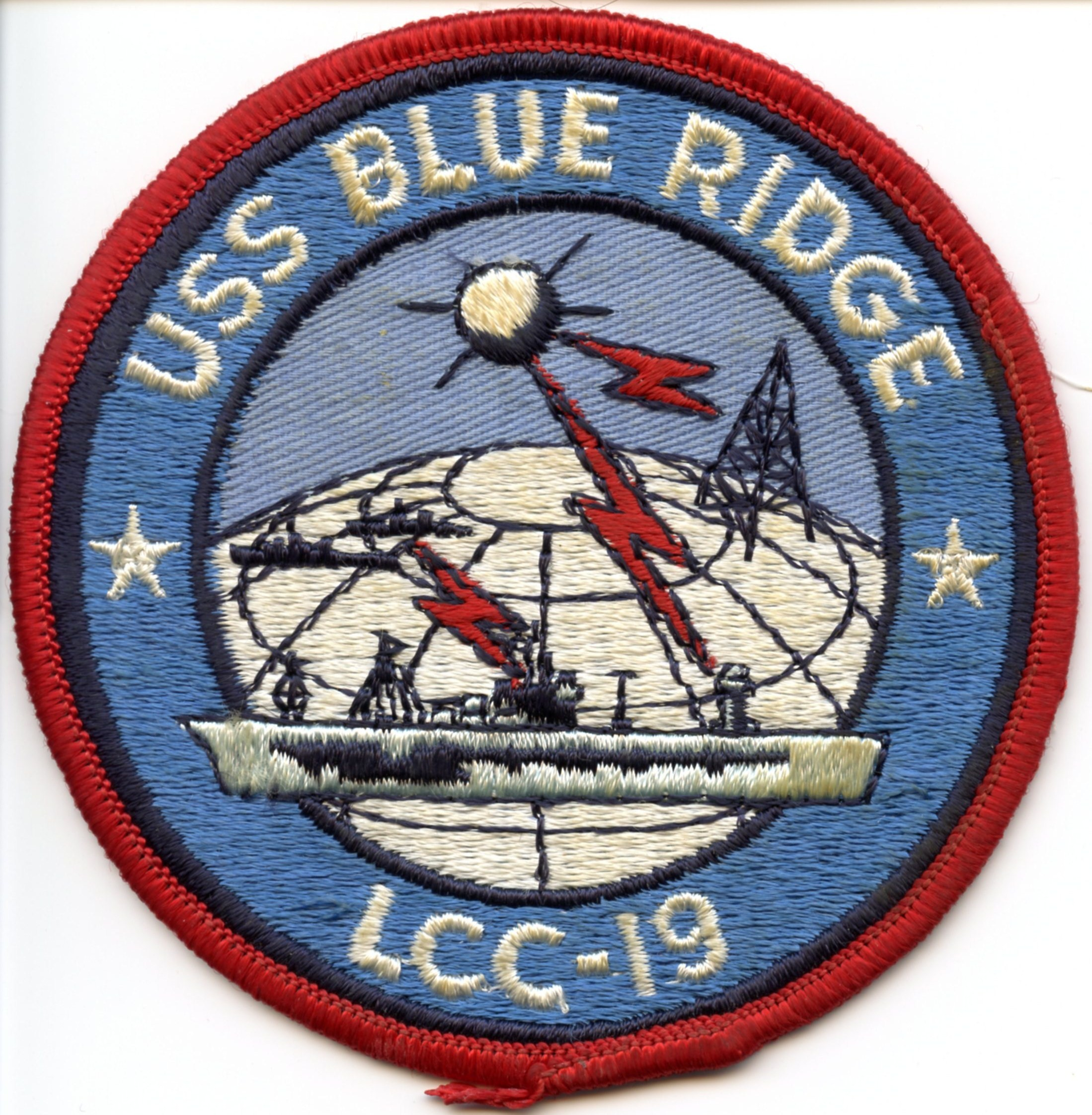
Ship's Jacket Badge. From the ship's store, 1971.

For Blue Ridge's first drydock since the Philadelphia Naval Shipyard, from 11 October to 19 November she was in the Long Beach Naval Shipyard for Post Shakedown availability. Blue Ridge's power plant was switched from Navy Standard Oil fuel to Navy Distillate fuel.

=== 1972 ===
From 1972 until 1979, Blue Ridge deployed to the Western Pacific on 6 WestPacs, as the flagship of the Commander Amphibious Force, Seventh Fleet.

=== February - WestPac I ===
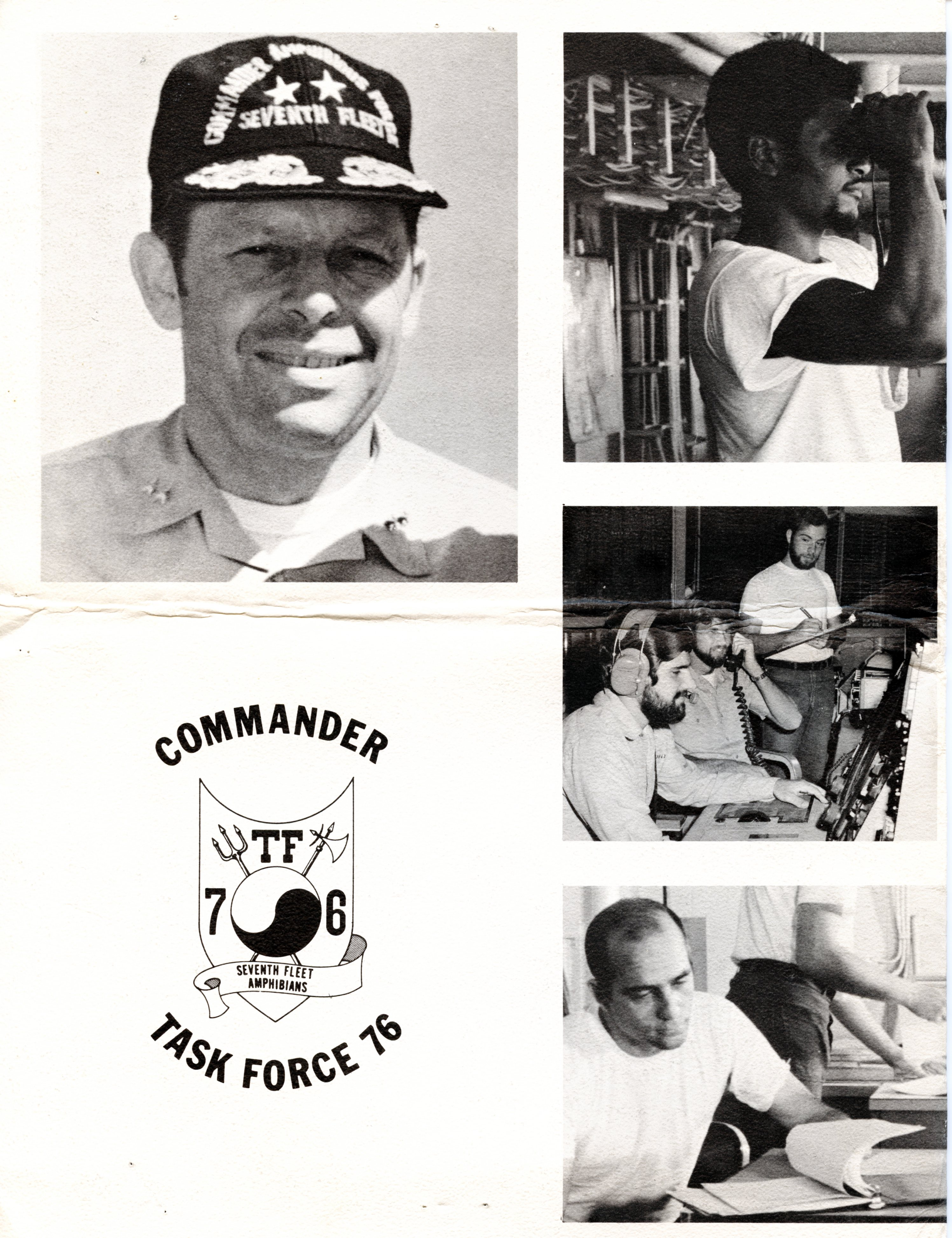
Admiral Gaddis on Blue Ridge

After completing degaussing in the deperming facility at Ballast Point, on 7 January 1972, Blue Ridge departed home port San Diego and steamed to Pearl Harbor for deployment on the ship's first WestPac, with port visits at Guam, Sasebo, Japan, White Beach, Okinawa, Subic Bay, Hong Kong and Singapore.

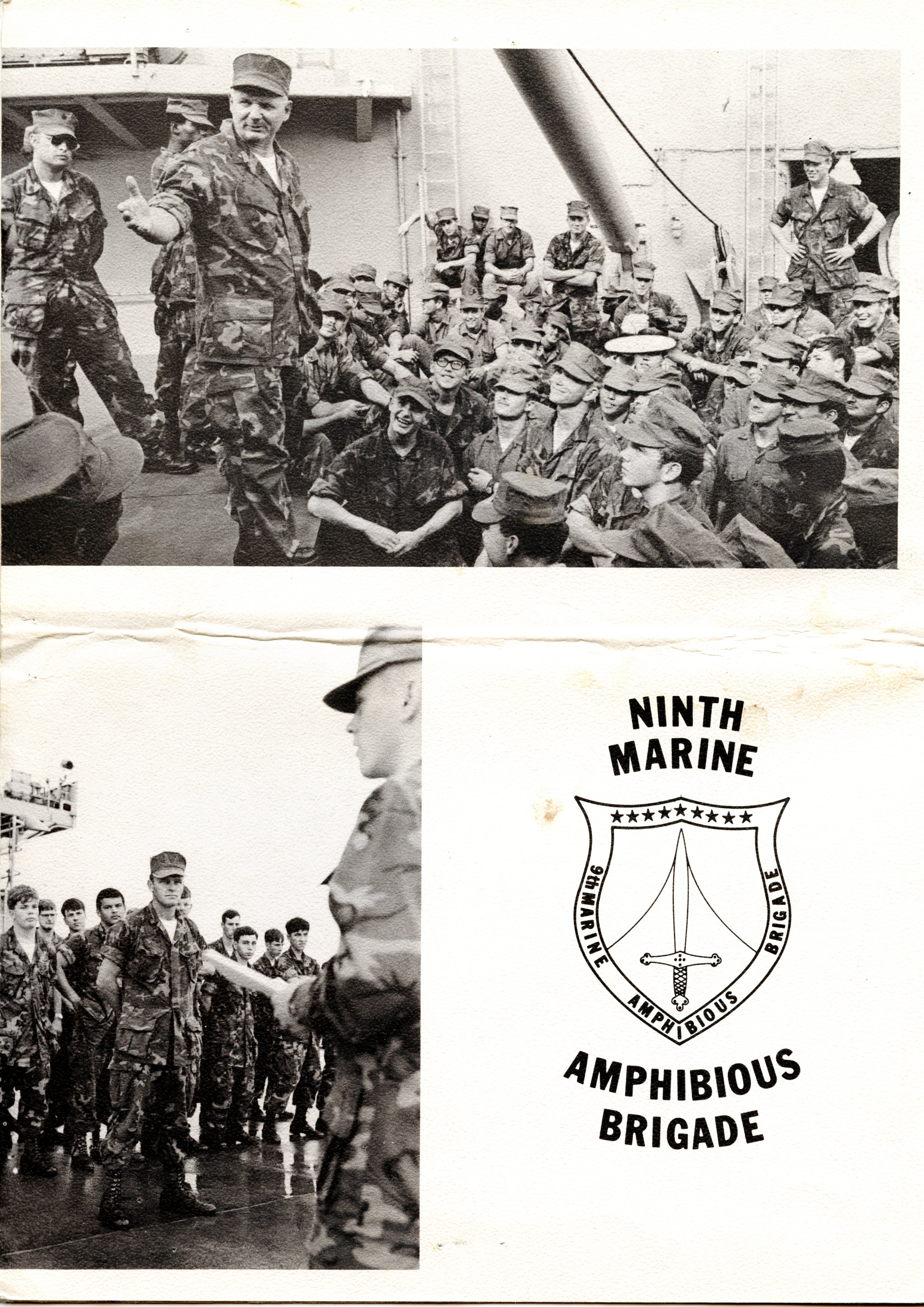
General Miller on Blue Ridge

Making the next leg of the transit to WestPac, Guam, with USS Sterett and USS Mahan, During the transit, four Soviet reconnaissance aircraft overflew the convoy to collect data on the new ship.

As the ship crossed the equator on 27 February 1972 at 0°N 105.24°E, bound for Singapore, Blue Ridge performed her second crossing the line ceremony.

Upon arrival at White Beach, "Blue Ridge" became the flagship for Commander Amphibious Group 1, Rear Admiral W. D. TOOLE, in this relieving USS Paul Revere (LPA-248).

Additional port visits were planned, but in late March 1972, as Blue Ridge prepared at White Beach, Okinawa for exercise Golden Dragon, North Vietnam invaded South Vietnam across the Vietnamese Demilitarized Zone (DMZ) on 30 March 1972 in their Easter Offensive. This was the largest invasion since the Korean War, radically departing from previous offensives. It was designed to strengthen the North Vietnamese position as the Paris Peace Accords drew towards a conclusion.

==== April - Easter Offensive ====
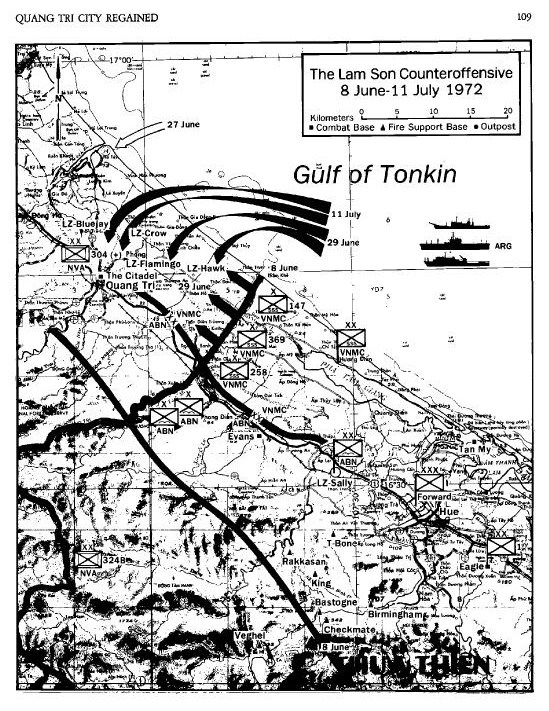
It was during the Lam Son Counter-Offensive, 27–29 June 1972, that Blue Ridge exchanged fire with coastal artillery batteries on Tiger Island earning the Combat Action Ribbon.

On 3 April 1972, Commander in Chief of the Pacific Fleet (CinCPac) Admiral John S. McCain Jr. cancelled Exercise Golden Dragon. General Miller and the 9th Marine Amphibious Brigade (9th MAB) staff were ordered to remain on Blue Ridge for combat or evacuation operations. The 9th MAB had various contingency plans from potentially conducting emergency evacuations to building up their forces.

On 5 April 1972, Blue Ridge departed for the war zone, the Gulf of Tonkin. Blue Ridge was the command ship during April through July for the last major combat amphibious engagement of the Vietnam War. The Easter Counter-Offensive was "the largest concentration of wartime amphibious force since the Inchon and Wonsan landings of the Korean War."

Detachment "N" of the 1st Radio Battalion, which collected radio messages to gain signals intelligence, had deployed with the 9th MAB for the exercise in Korea. It was integrated with the Task Force 76 Joint Intelligence Center and operated from the supplemental radio spaces of Blue Ridge using input from the service cryptologic agencies in Southeast Asia. However, operating from Blue Ridge posed reception problems because of the distance from shore. From 24 April 1972, two or three direct support elements were in operation from naval gunfire ships at any one time, with control remaining at the headquarters element on Blue Ridge. In July 1972, they moved to USS Paul Revere and when Blue Ridge returned to the United States, detachment analysts relocated to the Naval Communications Station, San Miguel, near San Antonio, Zambales, Philippines. As CTU 76.0.1, escorted by USS John Paul Jones, Blue Ridge conducted special operations in the Tonkin Gulf in Operation Venture Road.

==== June - The Counter-Offensive ====
With a lull in the fighting and 64 days at sea, Blue Ridge made a port call to Subic, from 7 to 14 June, for supplies and sanity, then returned to the Gulf of Tonkin.

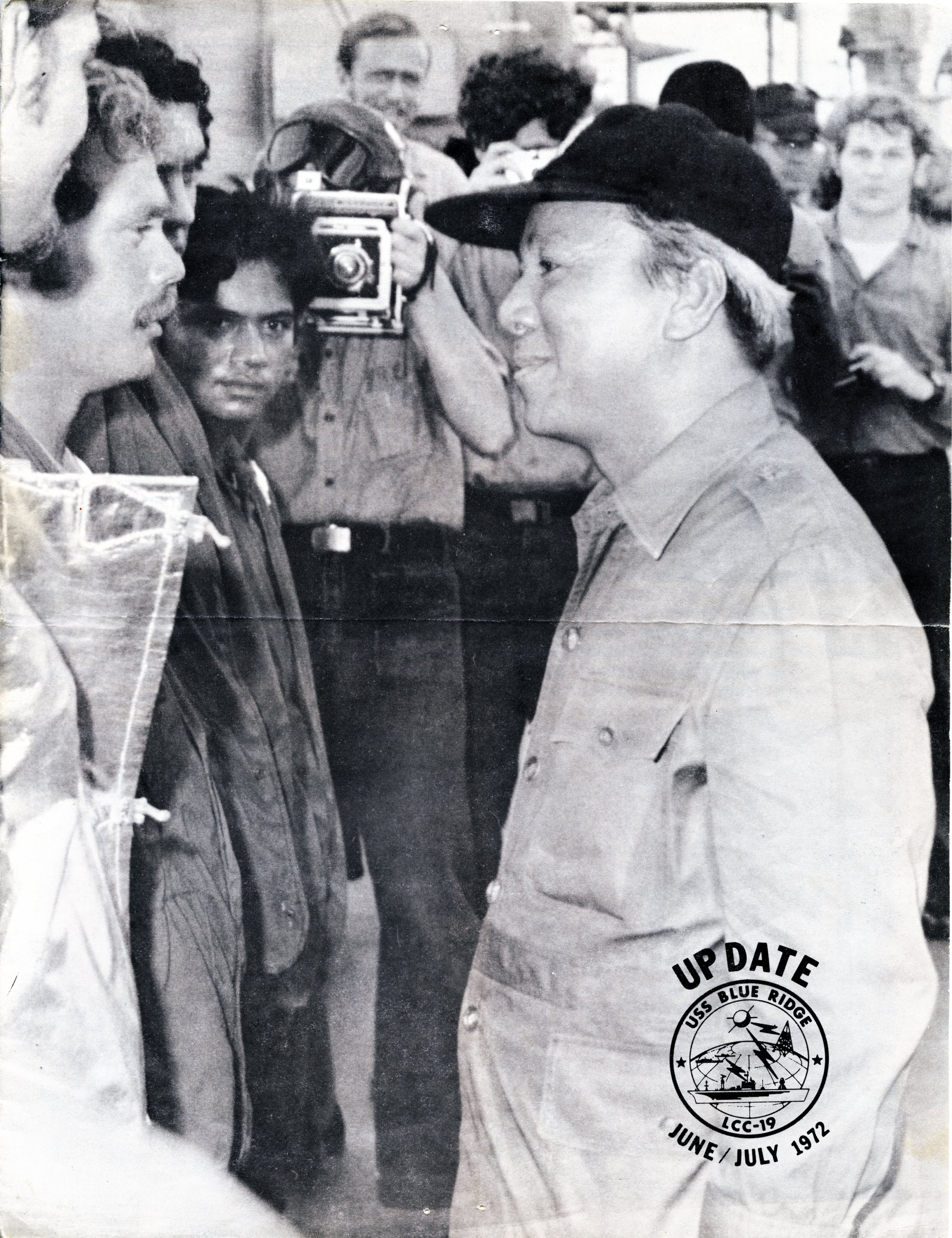
South Vietnamese President Nguyen Van Thieu visits Blue Ridge, 28 June 1972.

Nguyen Van Thieu, president of South Vietnam, came aboard Blue Ridge on 28 June 1972 to confer with Vice Admiral Holloway, Admiral Gaddis, General Miller and "to convey his personal thanks to the sailors and Marines of the amphibious forces for 'the preservation of Peace and Freedom' in South Vietnam."

On the first of July, while steaming outside of Da Nang Harbor, in the combat zone and the ship's port 3-inch gun manned, Blue Ridge had her first change of command. That day was also the day that Blue Ridge earned the Republic of Vietnam Campaign Medal.

The Easter Counter-Offensive was Blue Ridge's longest time at sea, 64 days from 5 April to 7 June 1972. After 7 days in Subic, Blue Ridge returned to the Gulf of Tonkin until 18 July 1972 and was then ordered to the Philippines for typhoon relief along with Tripoli, Juneau, Alamo, and Cayuga. "The 33d MAU and subordinate units were awarded the Philippine Presidential Unit Citation for their efforts", but Blue Ridge was not.

On 18 August 1972, Blue Ridge returned to San Diego. In September the ship received aboard, CNO Admiral Elmo R. Zumwalt Jr. and Secretary of the Navy, John Warner for visits. From 5 thru 9 October, Blue Ridge made a port visit to San Francisco, training and a First Fleet sponsored event.

=== WestPac II ===
From 12 February 1973 until 4 April 1973, Operation Homecoming, returning POWs from Hanoi and VC camps in South Vietnam went to Clark Air Base in the Philippines. With Blue Ridge still in her homeport of San Diego, the current ship's intelligence officer and prior ship's intelligence officer contributed to the operation. "The Army, Navy, Air Force and Marines each had liaison officers dedicated to prepare for the return of American POWs well in advance of their actual return. These liaison officers worked behind the scenes traveling around the United States assuring the returnees well being. They also were responsible for debriefing POWs to discern relevant intelligence about MIAs and to discern the existence of war crimes committed against them."

On 24 February 1973, Blue Ridge left San Diego for Pearl Harbor (2–3 March) and her second WestPac, with liberty port visits of Sasebo (7–14 June), Yokosuka (25 July-5 Aug), White Beach (15–31 March, 11 April, 16 Aug, 4-19 Sept), Hong Kong (7–12 May), Subic (26 March-5 April, 22-26 Sept, 7-8 Oct), Manila, Singapore (24-29 Aug) and Chilung (1–5 June). Blue Ridge conducted training exercises: Operation Golden Dragon in early April off South Korea, Operation Pagasa I in middle May off Philippines, Operation Pagasa II in early October off Philippines.

With Operation End Sweep progressing in the coastal waters of North Vietnam for the mines released there, Blue Ridge left White Beach again on 10 July 1973 headed for the Gulf of Tonkin. She carried equipment that was needed by U.S. helicopters that were involved in clearing mined North Vietnamese waters. Blue Ridge spent two nights in north Vietnamese waters off the coast of Vinh and Hon Matt before departing for Manila in the Philippines.

=== Arab Oil Embargo ===
Because of the problems associated with the Arab Oil Embargo of 1973, Blue Ridge, on the transit back to White Beach, Okinawa from port call in Singapore, became the first Seventh Fleet combatant ship to refuel at sea with a commercial tanker, taking on some 158,000 gallons of Navy distillate from the Falcon Princess.

Late in Blue Ridge's second WestPac, the ship was conducting a joint exercise with the Philippine Navy in the South China Sea called PAGASA II, as the command ship. One of Blue Ridge's ensigns went overboard unnoticed and when found absent for a watch muster, a compartment search was conducted aboard the ship for the missing officer. With failure to find him on 28 September 1973, a search and rescue operation commenced without success. Two days later the ensign was declared missing at sea and Exercise PAGASA II resumed. On Monday, 1 October 1973, the U.S. Embassy in Moscow was notified that the Soviet trawler AGI Kursograph found an American sailor in Blue Ridge's operation area and the ensign was returned safely to Blue Ridge the next day after diplomatic negotiations.

At the end of Pagasa II, bad tropical weather forced the transfer of the staff from Blue Ridge to Denver, after a very short stay in Subic Bay, to occur in White Beach instead, on 7 October. On 8 October, Blue Ridge steamed for homeport San Diego carrying a Patrol Craft Fast on the helicopter deck. Blue Ridge arrived in San Diego 23 October [1973].

=== WestPac III ===
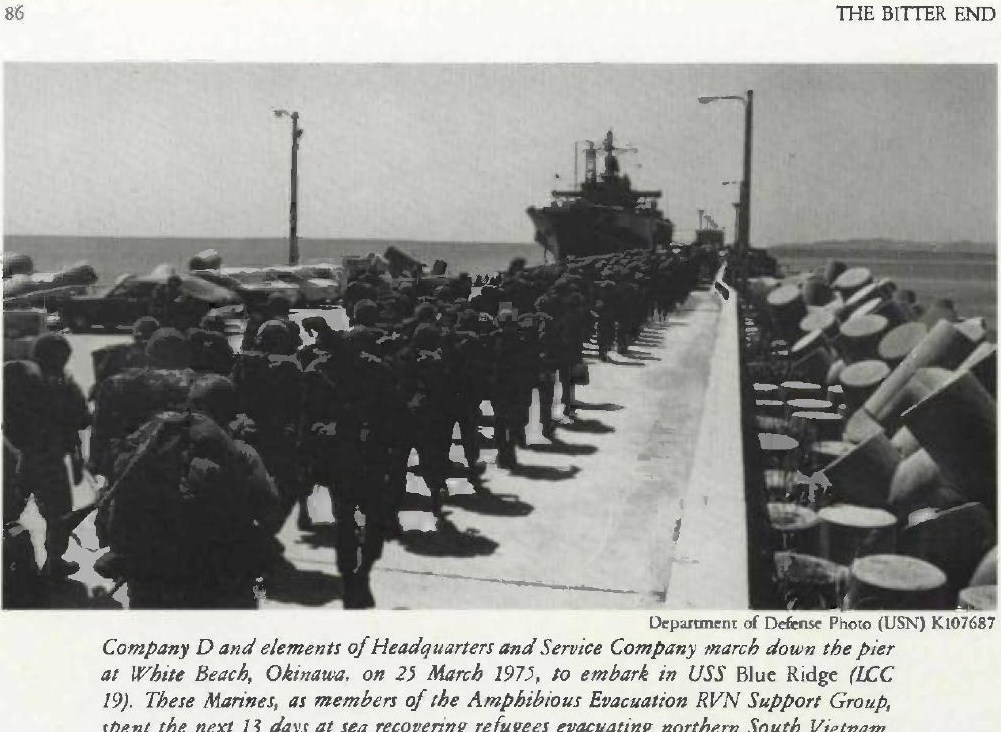
Marines coming aboard Blue Ridge for Vietnam at White Beach, on 25 March 1975

Late in March 1975 and late in Blue Ridge's third WestPac, the deteriorating military and political situation in Cambodia and South Vietnam disrupted Blue Ridge's operational plans as had occurred in late March 1972.

=== Evacuation of Saigon ===
Blue Ridge was at White Beach, Okinawa when the 9th MAB was alerted on 25 March 1975 for immediate departure to Da Nang to reinforce U.S. facilities, but Blue Ridge did not get underway for Vietnam until 27 March. Marines and sailors hastily trained for crowd control, evacuation procedures, and a Vietnamese orientation course. The printing section on board Blue Ridge reproduced thousands of signs in Vietnamese including a simplified instruction card for the small unit leader that included basic Vietnamese phrases and human relations oriented "do's and don'ts. However North Vietnamese forces captured Da Nang on 29 March.

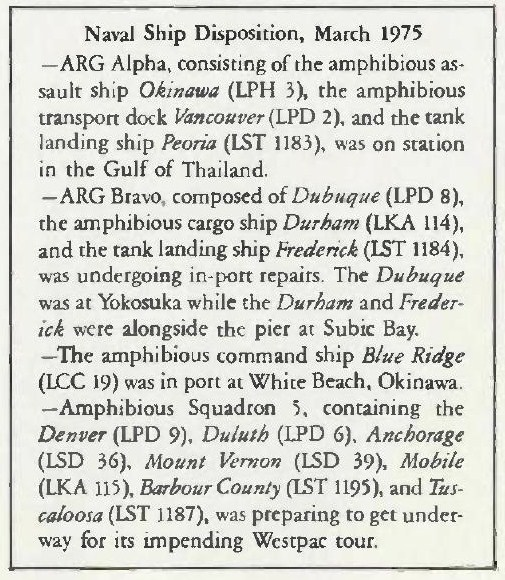
USN ship disposition in WestPac at the beginning

On 12 April, in response to the Cambodian government's crumbling defenses around the capital of Phnom Penh, Operation Eagle Pull evacuated 289 Americans, Cambodians and third country nationals by helicopter to the USS Okinawa.

After the end of the Battle of Xuân Lộc on 21 April, President Thieu resigned and fled into exile and North Vietnamese forces surrounded Saigon. The fixed wing evacuation from Tan Son Nhut Airport was halted by North Vietnamese artillery fire on the morning of 29 April and the helicopter evacuation Operation Frequent Wind commenced. Admiral Gayler directed USSAG/Seventh Air Force and Seventh Fleet to begin Frequent Wind Option IV at 10:51 (Saigon time), but for some unexplainable reason, dissemination of this message to the participating units had been delayed from 10:52 until 12:15. Evacuation helicopters finally departed with the first wave started landing at 15:06 and returning to fleet at 15:40 with the first load of evacuees.

The commanding officer of ProvMAG 39, Colonel McLenon, exercised control of his Marine aircraft through the Tactical Air Coordination Center (TACC) on board Blue Ridge. The Helicopter Direction Center on board Okinawa, maintained aircraft spacing and routing. The primary difference between TACC and HDC was that TACC controlled the tactical disposition of the helicopters and HDC controlled the helicopters as long as they were in the Navy's airspace. These areas of responsibility often overlapped and at times even merged. Under the conditions existing on the morning of 29 April 1975, the difference in control responsibilities of TACC and HDC at best seemed blurred, at worst redundant. Coordination and control of the overall embarkation operation suffered from more serious communication problems. Direct communications with Admiral Whitmire and 9th MAB Rear were sporadic, at best, requiring a continuous relay by the C-130 Airborne Battlefield Command and Control Center.

The sky over the evacuation fleet was soon filled with Republic of Vietnam Air Force (RVNAF) helicopters, looking for a place to land and unload their passengers. Five helicopters crashed on the ship that day, not counting ones ditched or abandoned overboard. One crashed, causing a near disaster and showering the ship and personnel with debris. An NBC film crew, with reporter George Lewis, filmed this unexpected arrival of RVNAF helicopters on the flight deck of Blue Ridge, showing the processing of the refugees and two helicopters' rotor blades colliding. To free up space on the flight deck, RVNAF helicopters were ditched by their pilots in the South China Sea after unloading their refugees on ship. Along with the widely published photo of an RVNAF UH-1 Huey being pushed over the side of Blue Ridge, they filmed one unknown crew member being tossed into a flight deck safety net by the movement of the chopper going over the side.

The evacuation continued until the morning of 30 April with the last helicopter evacuating the Marine Security Guards from the roof of the U.S. Embassy at 07:53 and landing on USS Okinawa at 08:30. At 11:30 North Vietnamese tanks smashed through the gates of the Presidential Palace less than 1 km from the Embassy and raised the flag of the Viet Cong over the building, ending the Vietnam War.

=== 1980s ===
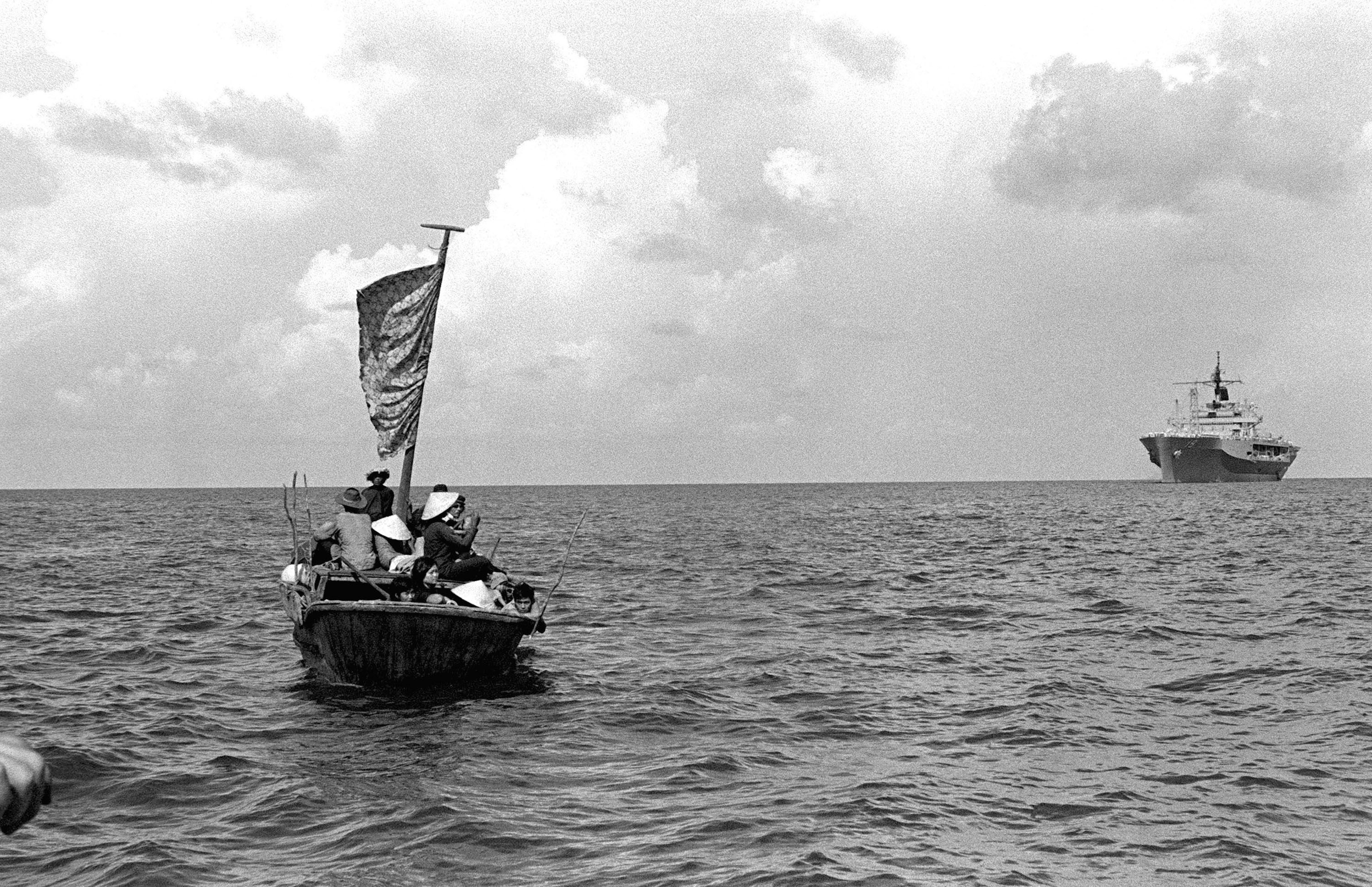
Blue Ridge rescues boat people from Vietnam, in the South China Sea, on 15 May 1984.

With the decommissioning of the 7th Fleet Flagship cruiser USS Oklahoma City in December 1979, Blue Ridge became the new flagship of the U.S. Seventh Fleet, and has been forward deployed at the Yokosuka Naval Base, Japan ever since.

From 21 July 1979 through 30 June 1984, Blue Ridge and other ships in the West Pacific engaged in operation Boat People, receiving the Humanitarian Service Medal, rescuing refugees from Vietnam. For example, on 6 October 1980 while transiting the South China Sea, Blue Ridge embarked Vietnamese refugees onboard from two separate small boats. The first being sighted before noon contained 54 total refugees. The second containing 37 were embarked onboard Blue Ridge shortly after 1800. Both boats were dangerously overloaded, and adrift when sighted. Of the 54 total refugees aboard the first boat, all were in good health, having been to sea only a few days. Of the 37 total refugees aboard the second boat, all were severely dehydrated, many so weak they could not stand, and had to be hoisted aboard Blue Ridge. Mechanical failure of the second boat had left the 37 adrift well short of the shipping lane. Initially it was unclear how long they had been at sea, though they had been without potable water for many days. Also on 15 May 1984 Blue Ridge rescued 35 refugees in the South China Sea, 350 nautical miles (650 km) northeast of Cam Ranh Bay.

In late September–early October 1986, Blue Ridge visited Sydney, New South Wales, as part of the United States contingent for the Royal Australian Navy's 75th anniversary International Fleet Review, including participation in the review on 4 October 1986. Later that month, Blue Ridge moored in Fremantle, Western Australia, for a six-day port visit beginning 19 October 1986.

In May 1989, Blue Ridge, Sterett and Rodney M. Davis visited Shanghai, China. They were the first U.S. warships to enter Shanghai Harbor in 40 years and it was only the second visit by U.S. warships to the People's Republic of China since 1949.

=== 1990s ===
Blue Ridge performed a nine-and-a-half–month deployment as flagship for commander, United States Naval Forces Central Command (ComUSNavCent), during Operations Desert Shield, and Desert Storm from 28 August 1990 through 24 April 1991, receiving a Navy Unit Commendation.

In July 1996, Blue Ridge visited Vladivostok for the 300th Anniversary of the Russian Navy.

=== 2000s ===
Blue Ridge participated in the international force East Timor (INTERFET) in February 2000.

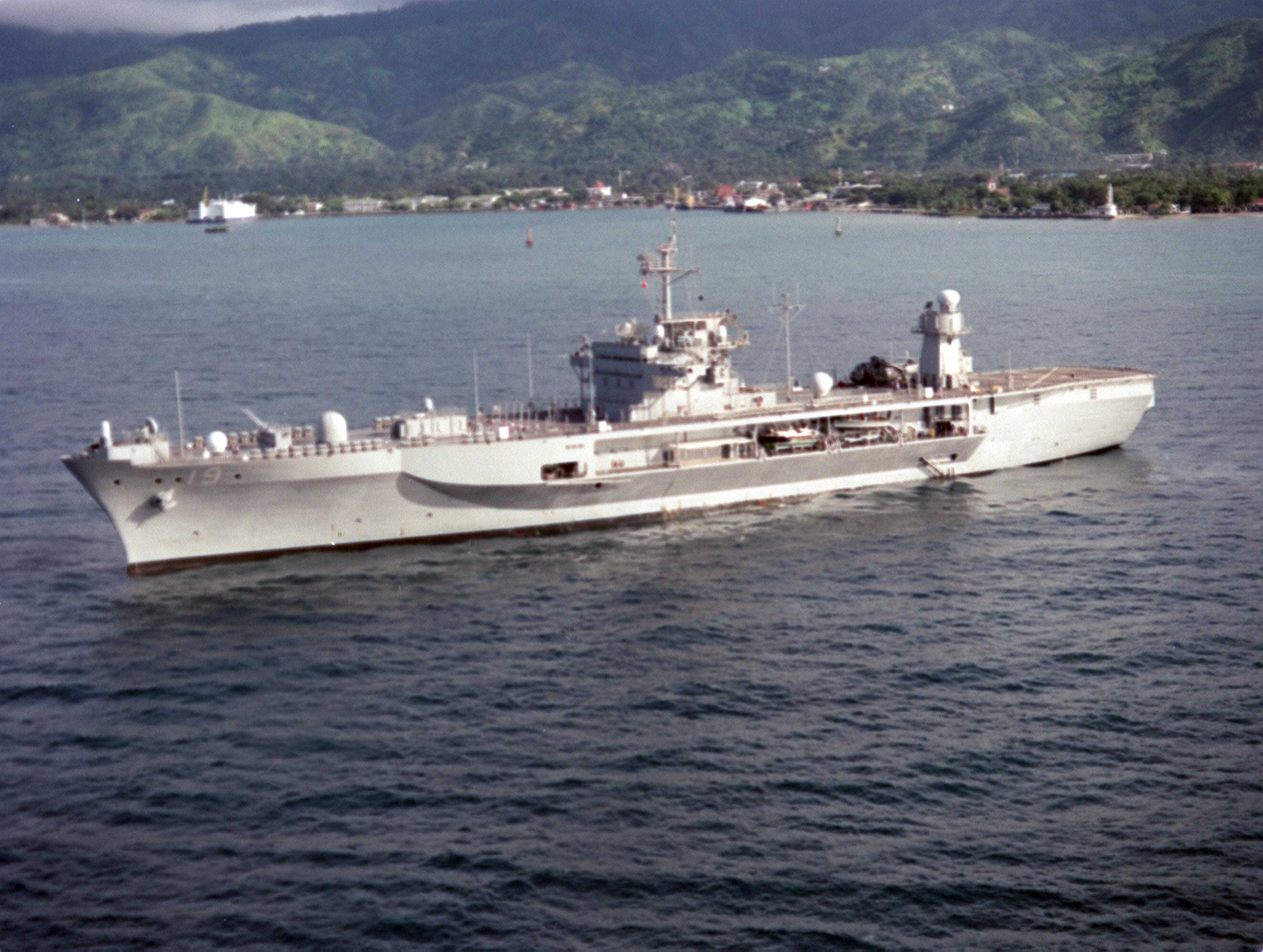
USS Blue Ridge in East Timor (2000)

Blue Ridge participates routinely in U.S. and allied training exercises each year with countries throughout the Western Pacific and Indian Ocean. For example, in 2009 Blue Ridge participated in ANNUALEX 21G (Annual Exercise 21G) with the Japan Maritime Self-Defense Force and PASSEX (Passing Exercise) with the French Navy.

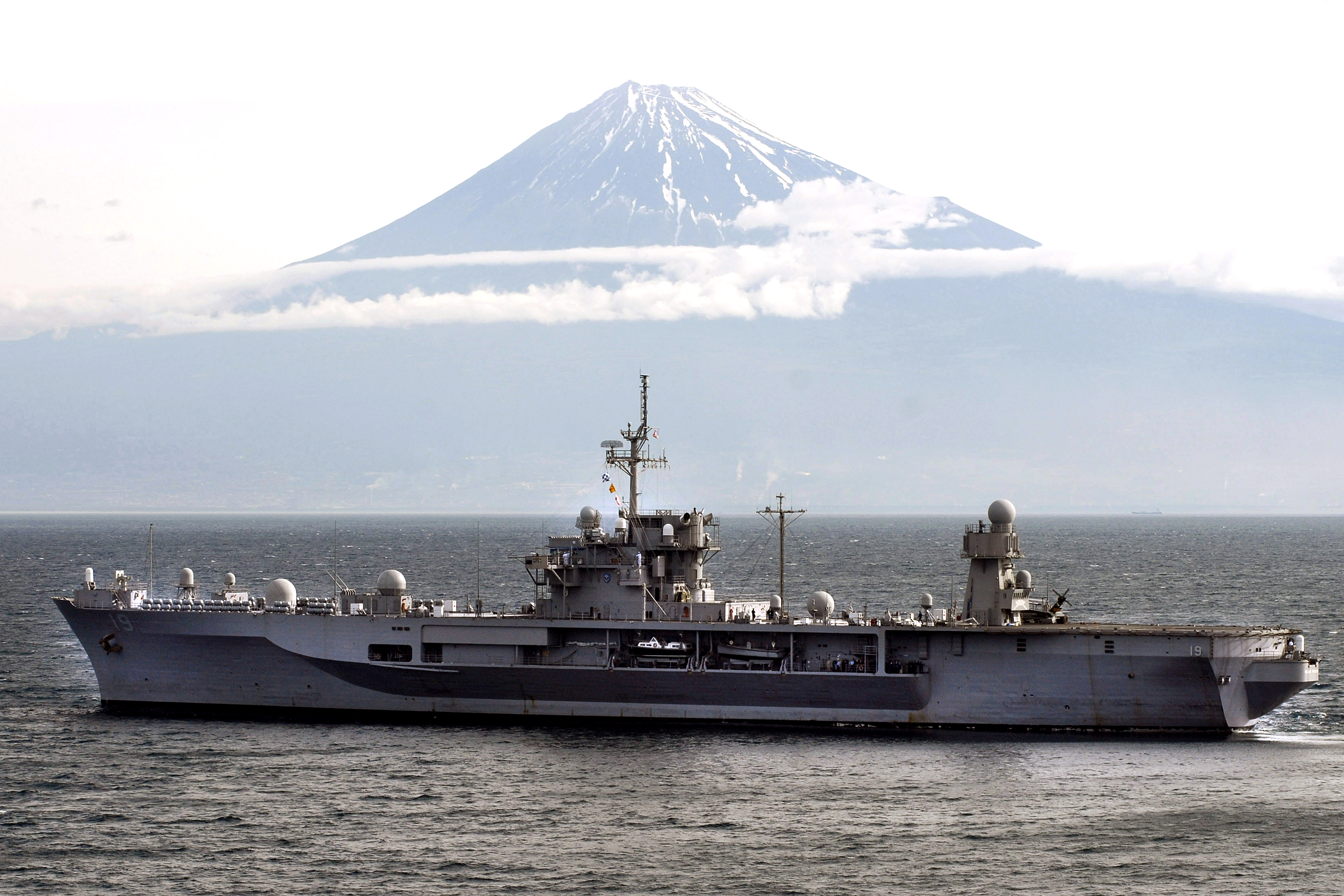
USS Blue Ridge steams within sight of Japan's Mount Fuji as she heads for port at the end of a six-week Spring Swing tour, Shimizu, Japan (May 2008).

=== 2010s ===
Blue Ridge was one of several participating in disaster relief in Operation Tomodachi, after the 2011 Tōhoku earthquake and tsunami. Blue Ridge brought relief supplies from Singapore to Japan but remained in the vicinity of Okinawa where the embarked U.S. Seventh Fleet staff provided command and control for the duration of Operation Tomodachi. The Seventh Fleet Band disembarked from Blue Ridge in order to provide the Japanese public with concerts dedicated to the victims of the tsunami. On 9 May 2010, sailors from Blue Ridge took part in a Victory Day Parade of the Russian Navy's Pacific Fleet in the city of Vladivostok, being assembled on the city square next to French sailors. The officer inspecting the parade greeted the sailors, to which the sailors responded with a Russian-style threefold loud Ura.

=== 2020s ===
Passageway on USS Blue Ridge

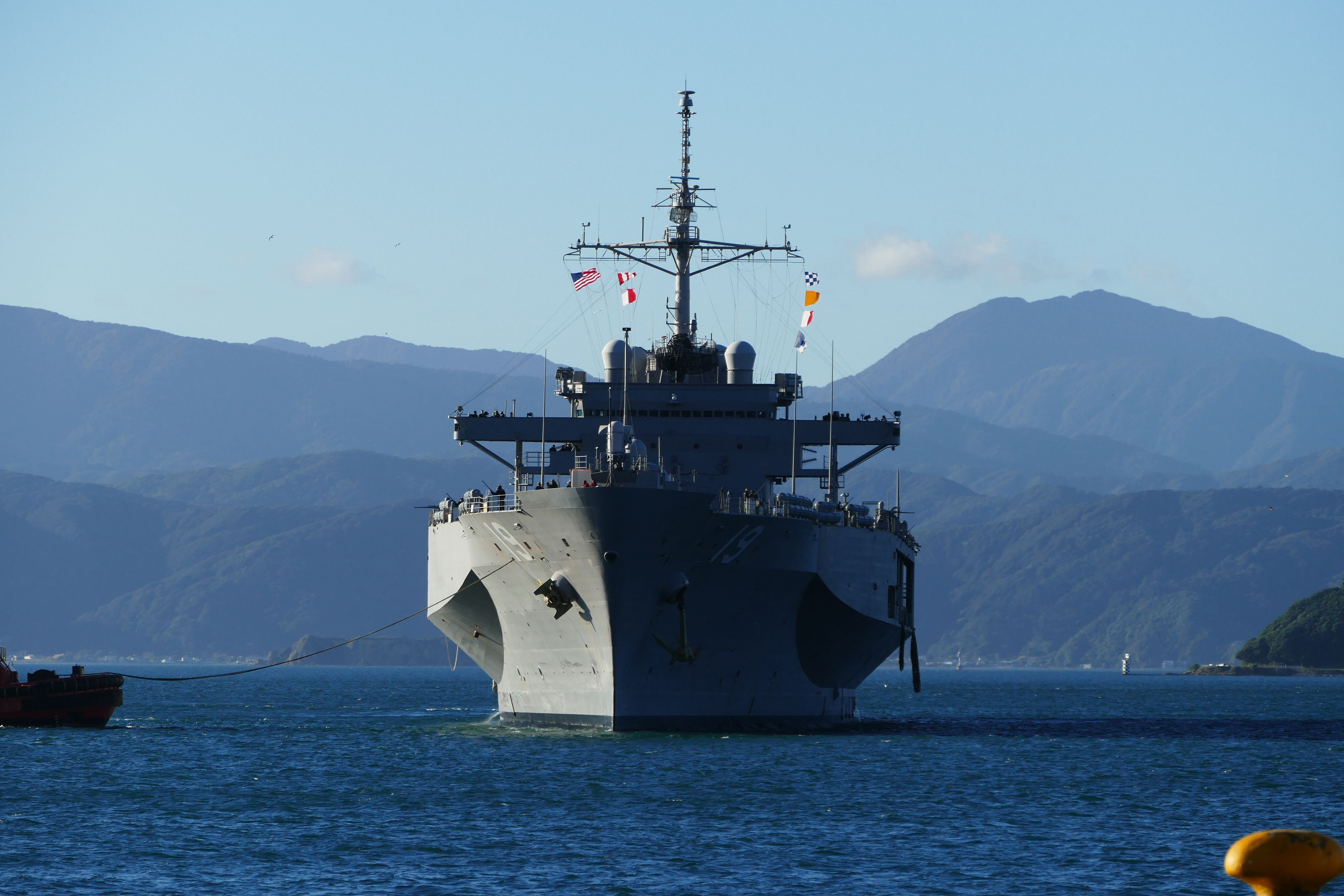
USS Blue Ridge visit to New Zealand in May 2025

On 25 January 2020, an MH-60S helicopter attached to the ship crashed approximately 60 nautical miles (110 km) from Okinawa, Japan. Following search and rescue efforts all five crewmembers were found uninjured.

The ship is expected to remain in service until 2039.

In mid May 2025, the Blue Ridge visited Wellington to reaffirm bilateral relations with New Zealand. This marked the first visit to Wellington by a US warship since 2021.

== Awards ==
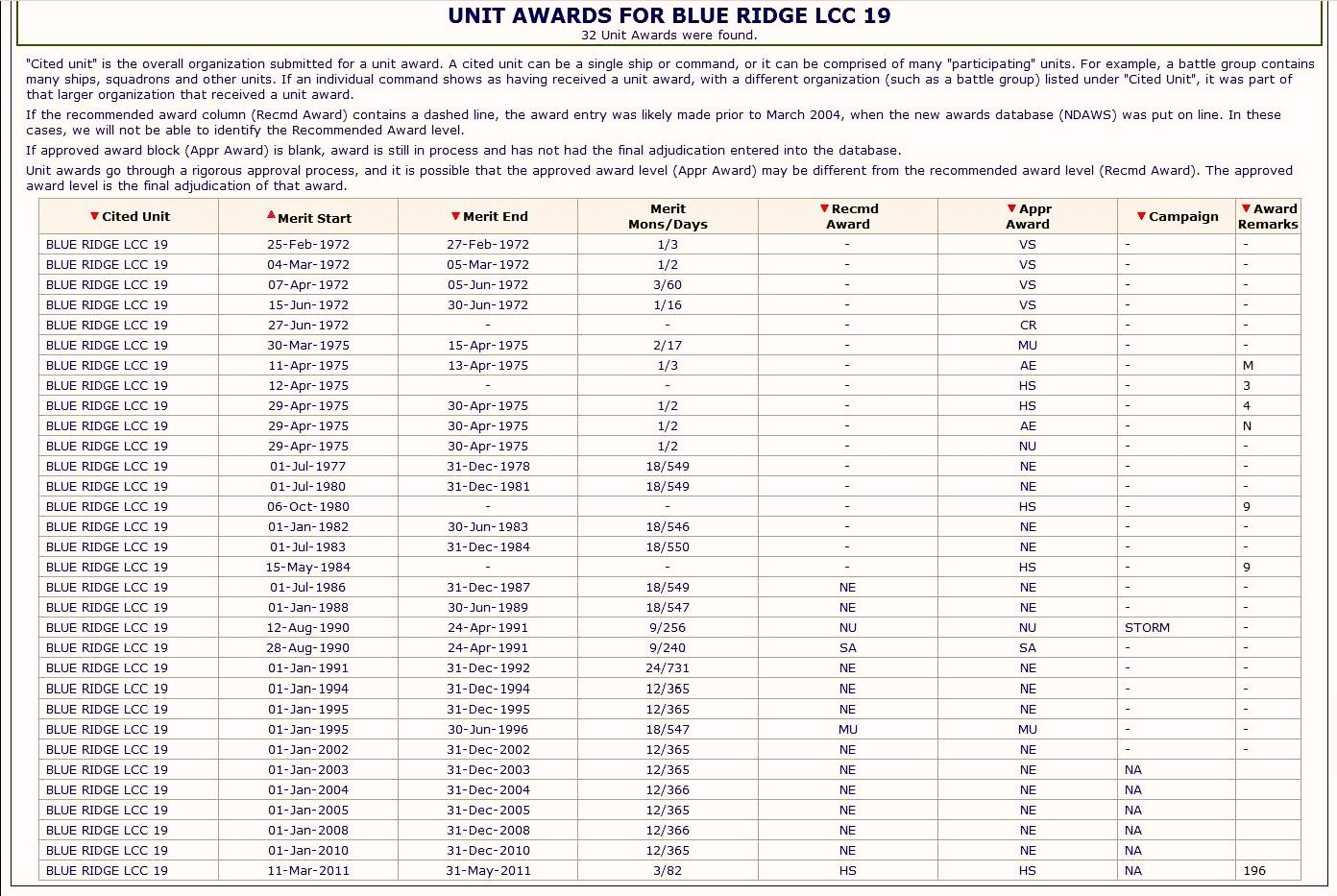
Official U.S. Navy Unit Awards Report for USS Blue Ridge (LCC-19), as of 5 May 2014.

On 18 July 1972, Blue Ridge was awarded the Combat Action Ribbon for her action at Tiger Island, and on 9 August 1972, the ship was awarded the Battle "E" by the commander Amphibious Force, U.S. Pacific Fleet. It was the only one Blue Ridge received prior to substantial changes made to the award in 1976 and is not listed as a Navy "E" Ribbon on the unit awards page. Blue Ridge received 15 Navy "E" Ribbon awards from 1977 to 2010.

Blue Ridge was awarded the Vietnam Service Medal and has two campaign stars one for Consolidation II '72 Campaign and the second for Vietnam Ceasefire '72 Campaign (Easter Counter-Offensive) with a total of 99 days in the combat zone, not counting 18 uncredited days in July 1972.

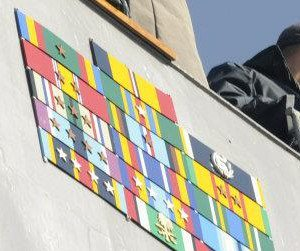
A January 2012 photo of the medals displayed by USS Blue Ridge.

Blue Ridge may have earned the Republic of Vietnam Campaign Medal for six months of service off South Vietnam from February to July 1972 as listed by NavSource. However, The Navy Unit awards page does not mention the award and the ship's crew did not paint the Republic of Vietnam Campaign Medal on the ship's bridge wing in 1993 or 2011.

Operation Eagle Pull (11–13 April 1975), the evacuation of the U.S. Embassy in Cambodia, Blue Ridge was awarded the Meritorious Unit Commendation, Armed Forces Expeditionary Medal and the Humanitarian Service Medal.

Operation Frequent Wind (29–30 April 1975), the evacuation of Saigon, South Vietnam, Blue Ridge was awarded the Navy Unit Commendation, Armed Forces Expeditionary Medal and the Humanitarian Service Medal. Blue Ridge received Humanitarian Service Medals for two different operations in 1980 and 1984 for rescuing Vietnamese boat people.

Blue Ridge received the ship's second Navy Unit Commendation along with the Southwest Asia Service Medal, the Kuwait Liberation Medal (Saudi Arabia) and Kuwait Liberation Medal (Kuwait) for Desert Shield and Desert Storm. The ship was also awarded the Joint Meritorious Unit Award and the Humanitarian Service Medal during Operation Tomodachi.

Blue Ridge earned the Captain Edward F. Ney Memorial Award several times, including 2010.

== Gallery ==
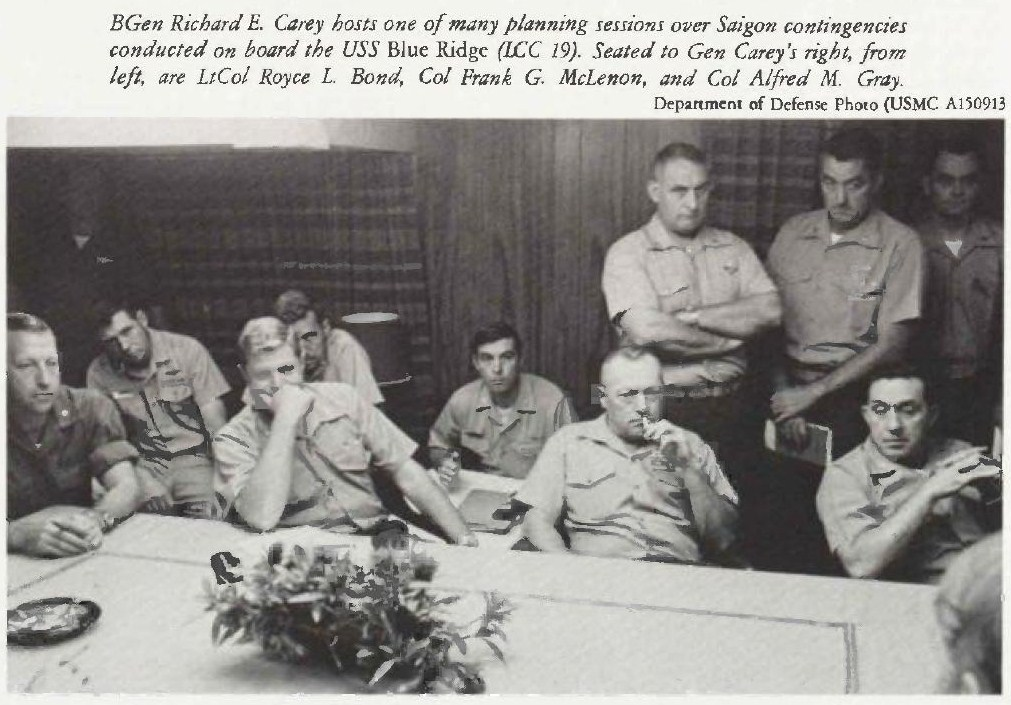
Marine staff meeting on Blue Ridge

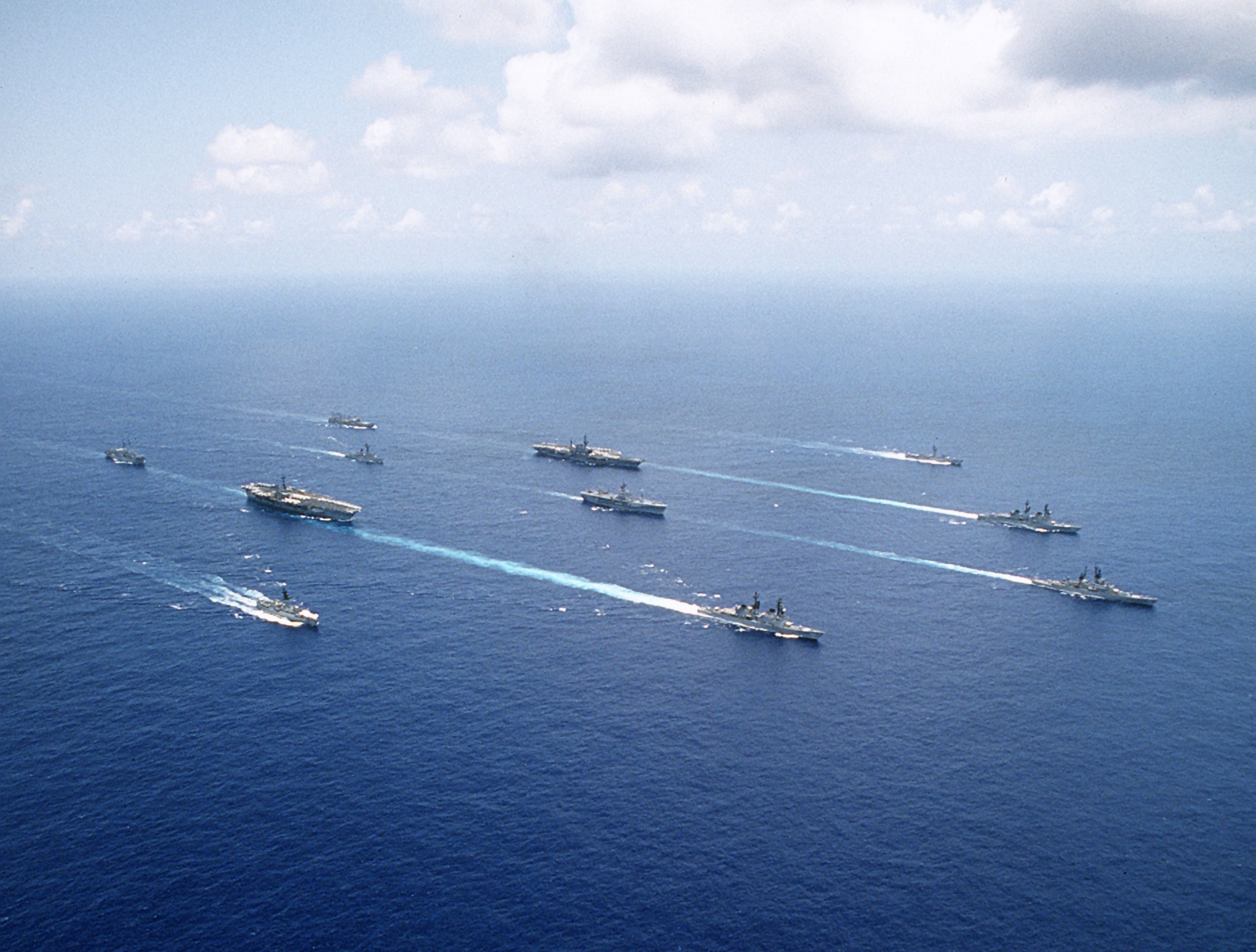
Blue Ridge (center) flanked by ships of the Midway and Ranger battle groups, 30 April 1982.

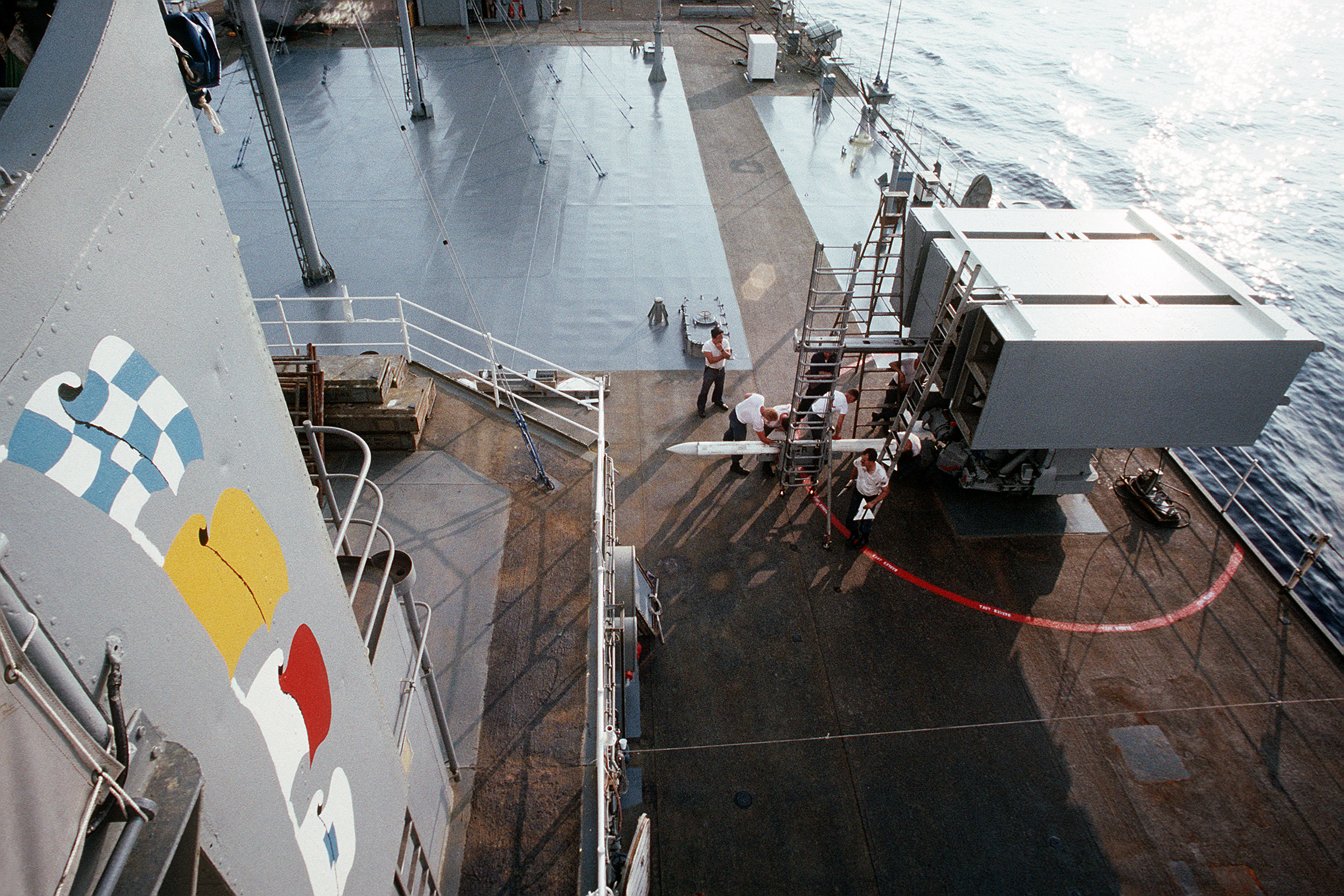
A Sea Sparrow being loaded into a Mark 25 launcher on Blue Ridge during Desert Storm, 1 April 1991.

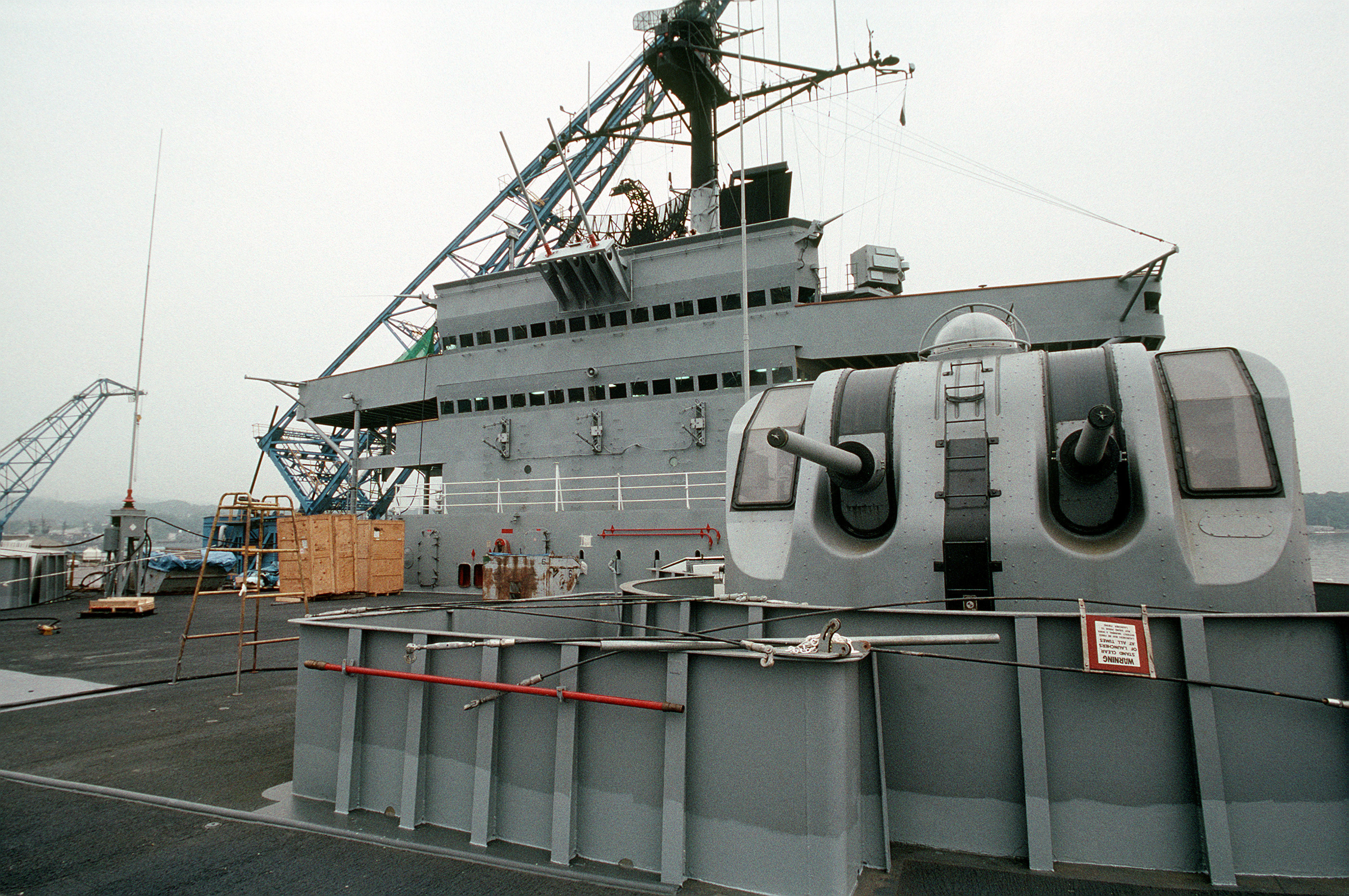
A Mark 33 twin 3"/50 gun mount on Blue Ridge, 10 August 1991.

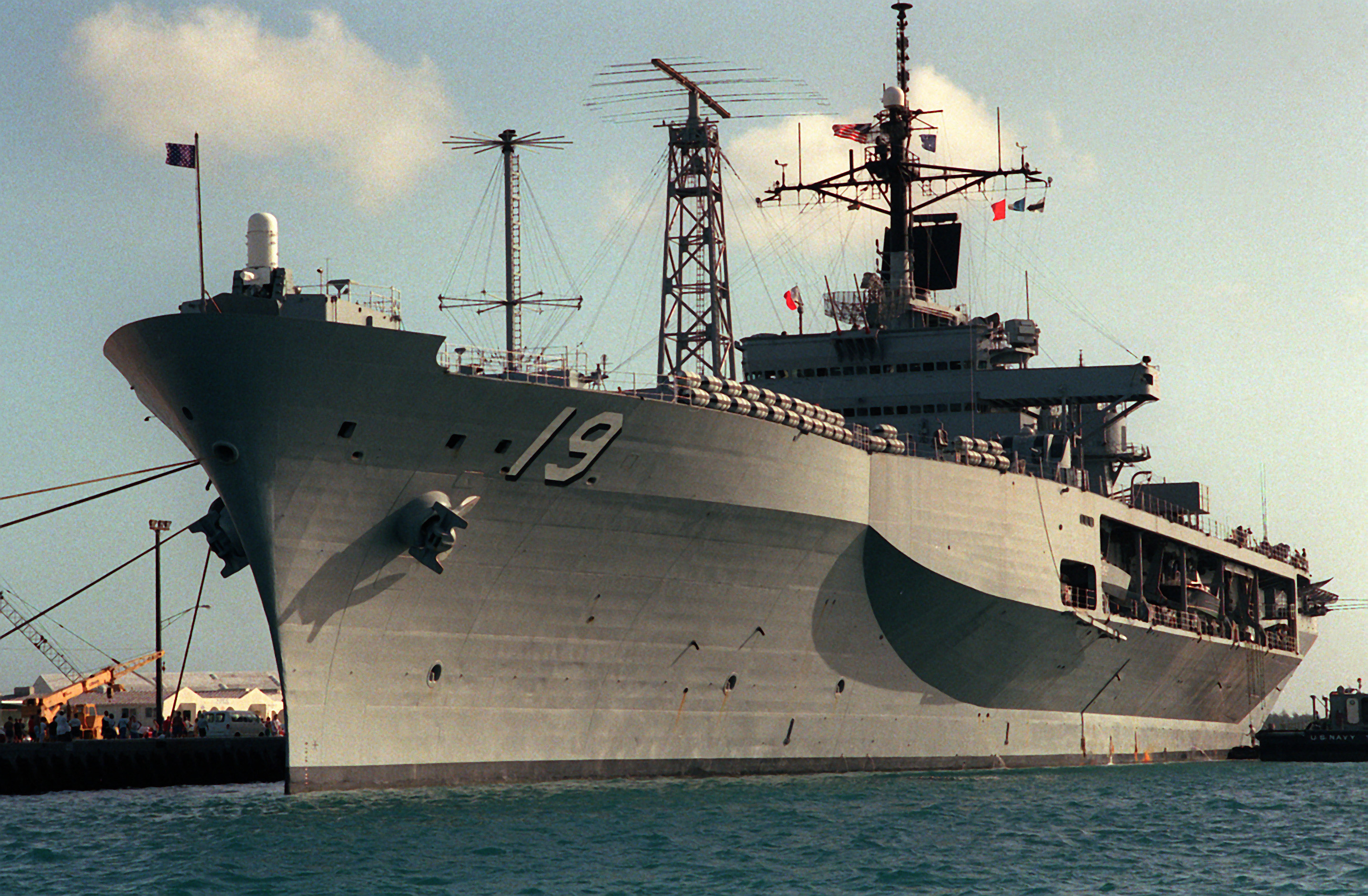
Port bow view of Blue Ridge showing the hurricane bow, CIWS as well as many of the legacy antennas, gun mount and missile launcher, 20 April 1992.

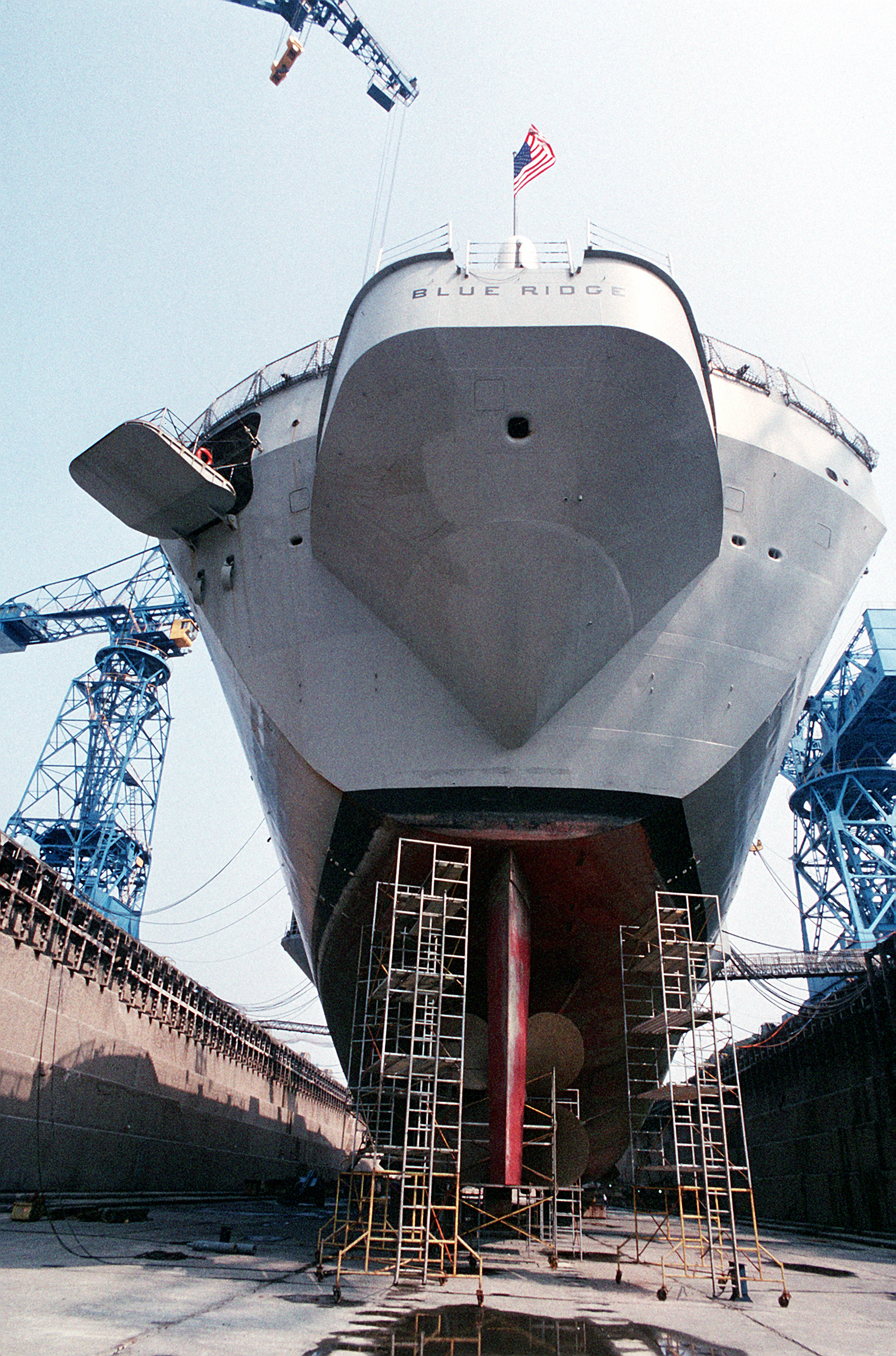
Stern view of Blue Ridge in Dry Dock, 1 September 1992.

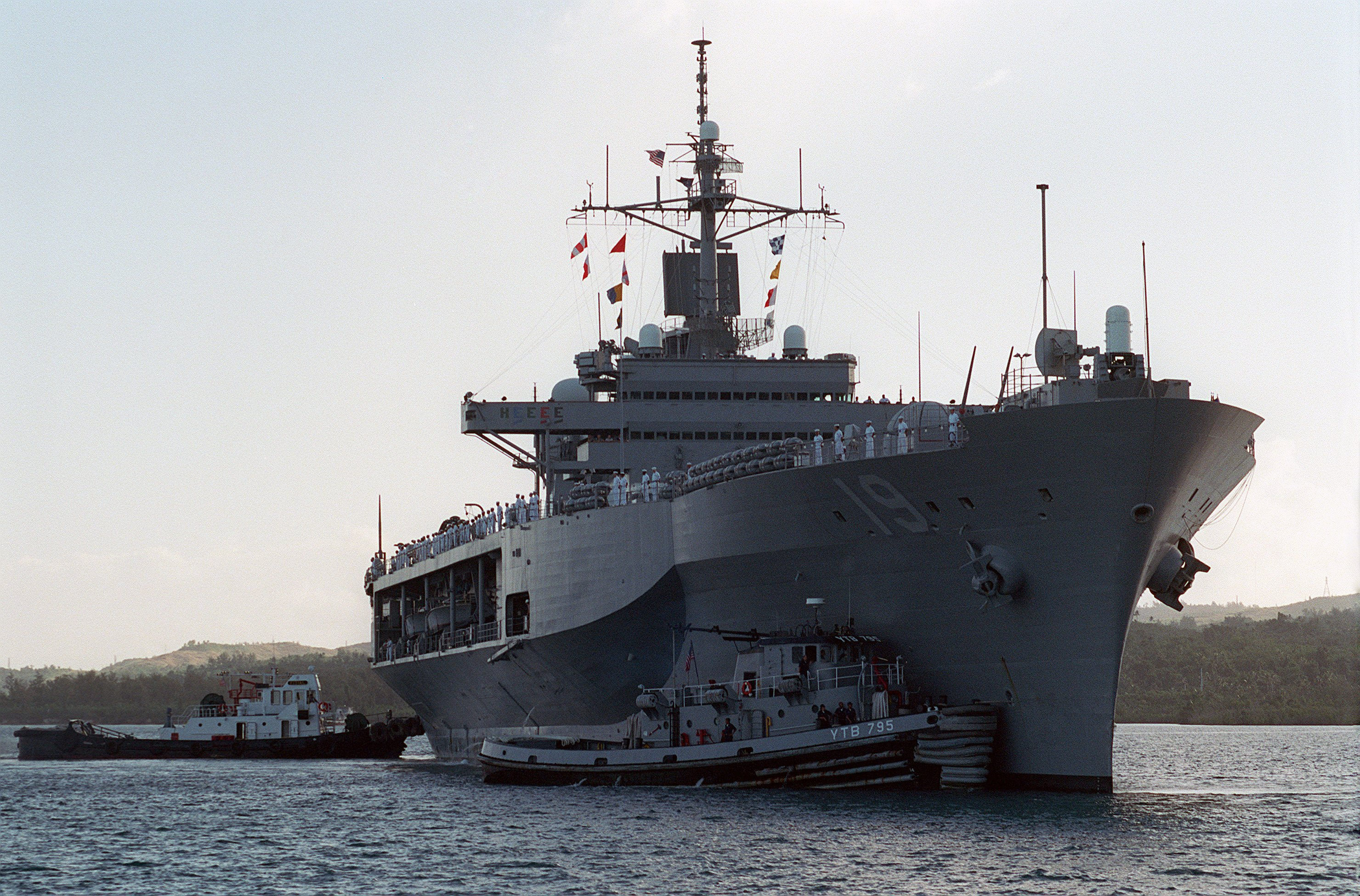
The tug Ketchikan (YTB-795) assists Blue Ridge during Exercise TANDEM THRUST '99.

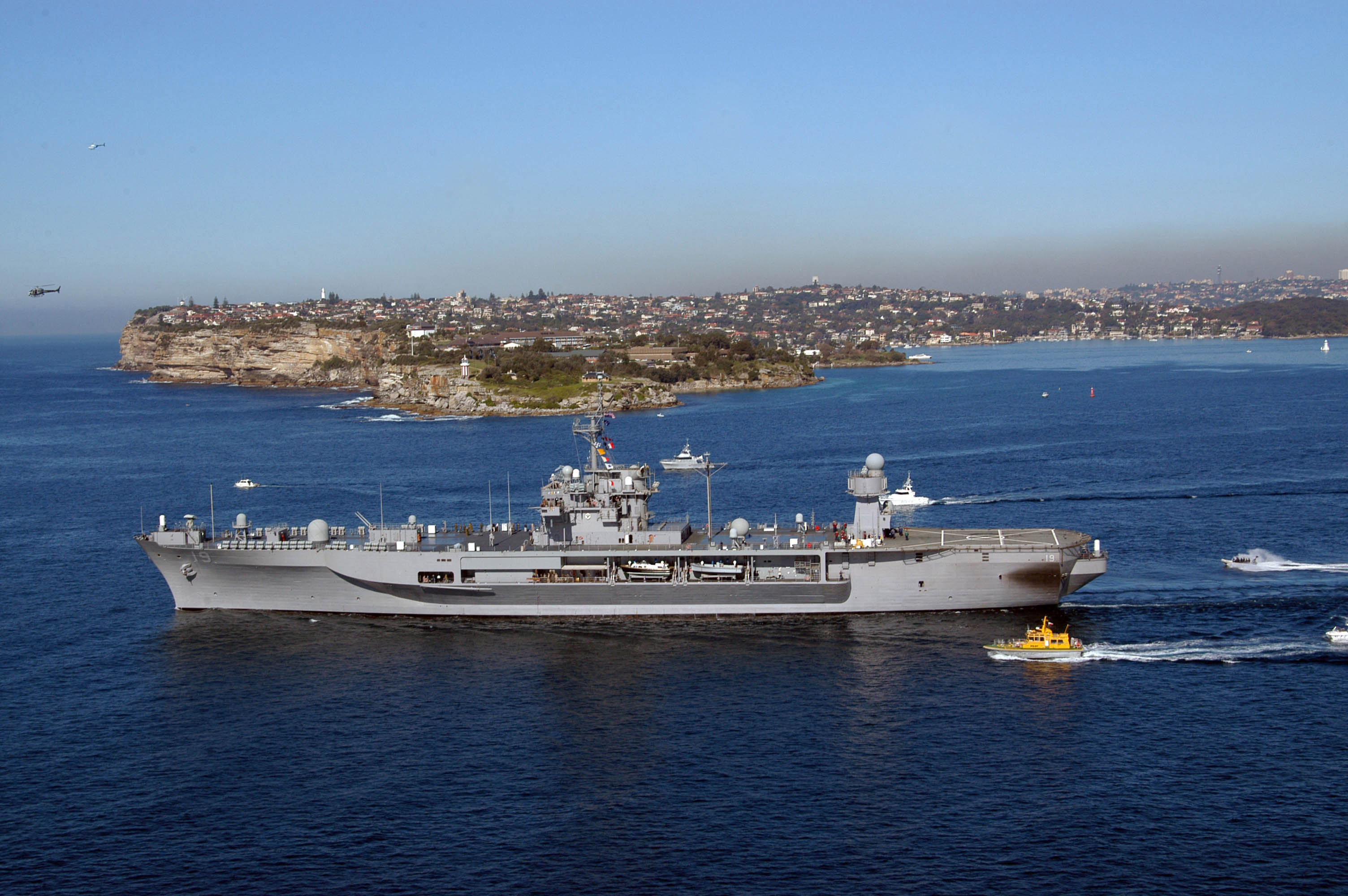
Blue Ridge departs Australia to take part in Talisman Saber 2005.

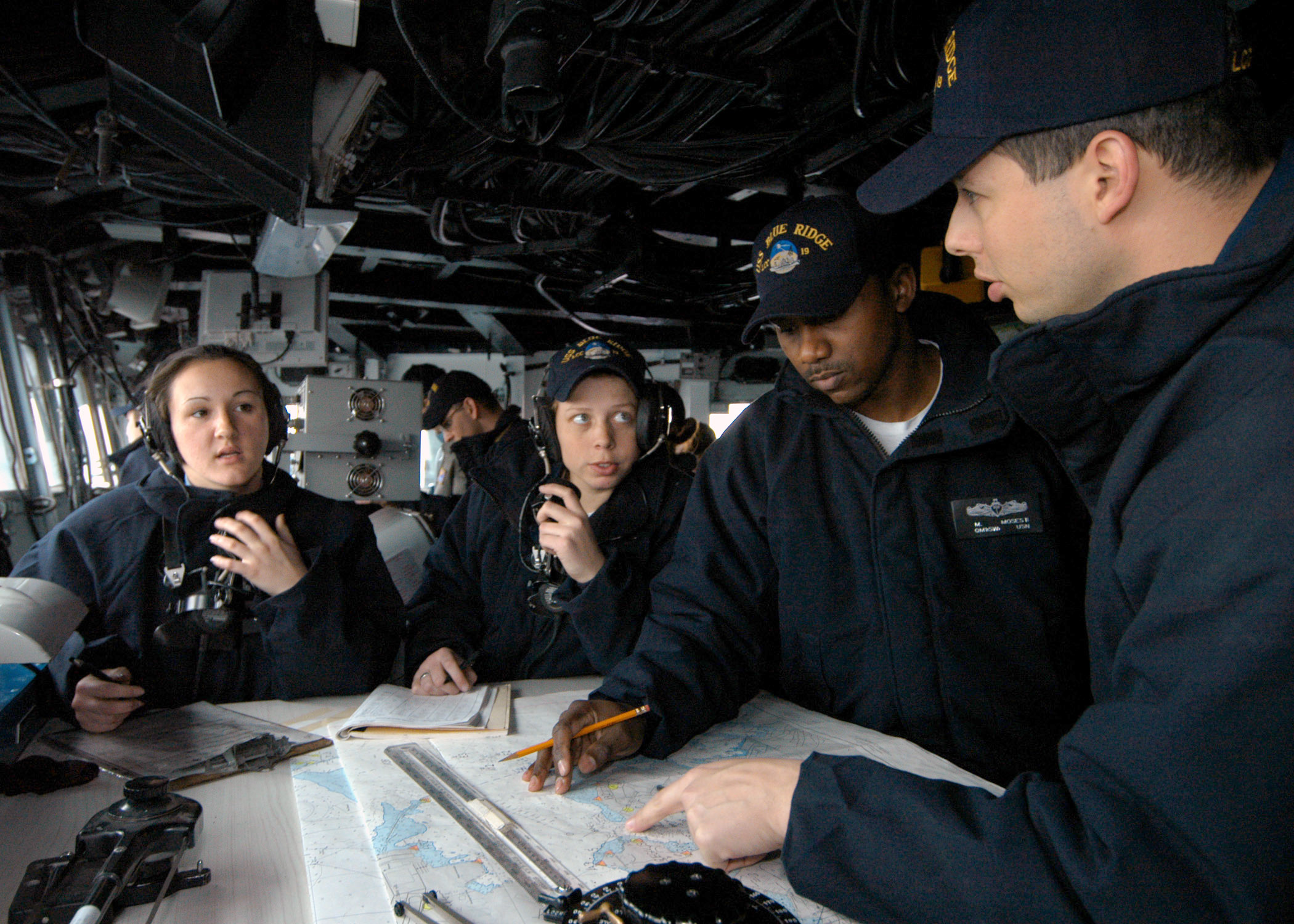
On board the bridge of the Blue Ridge, 18 January 2006

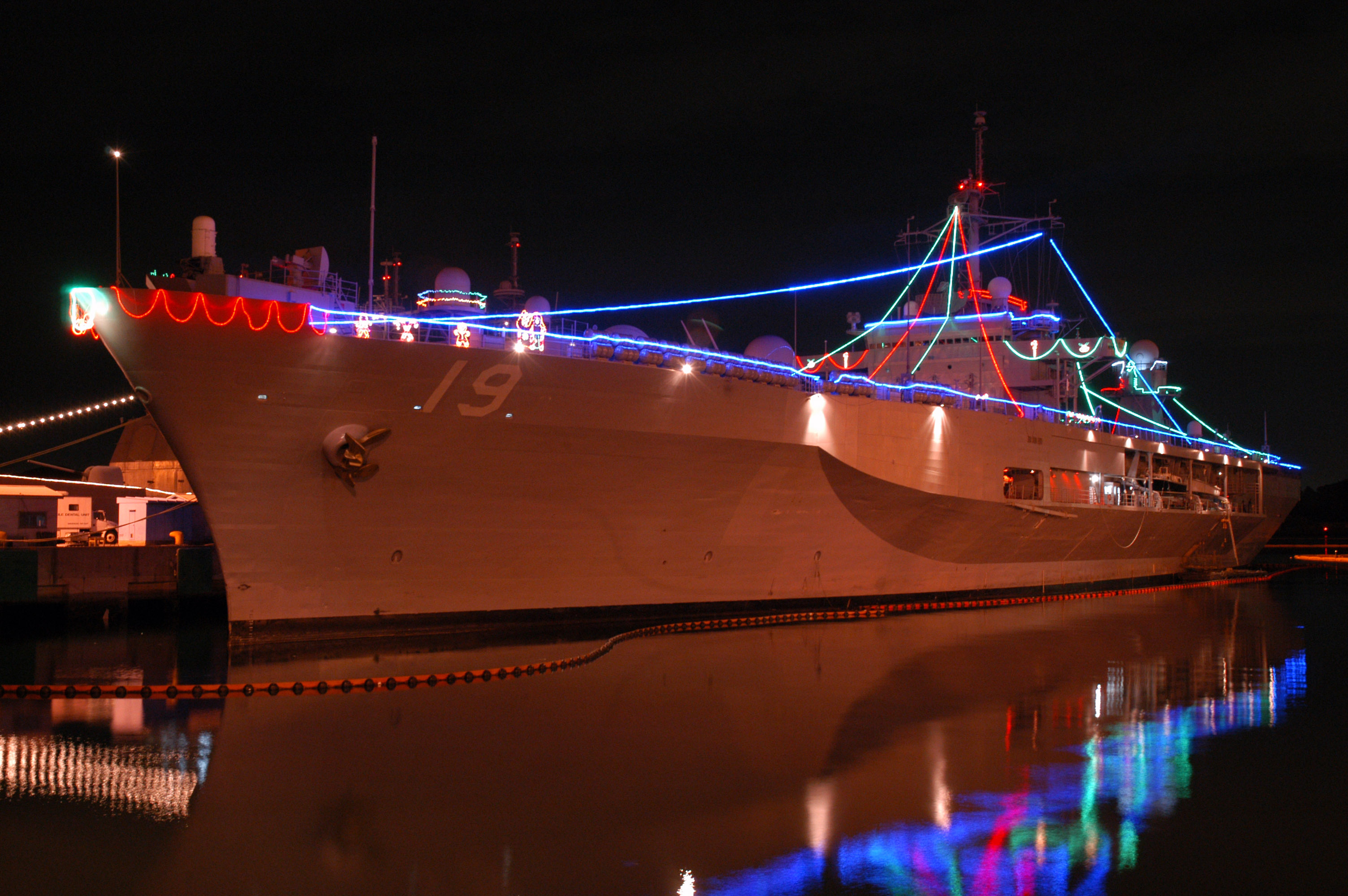
Blue Ridge decorated for the holidays, 6 December 2007.

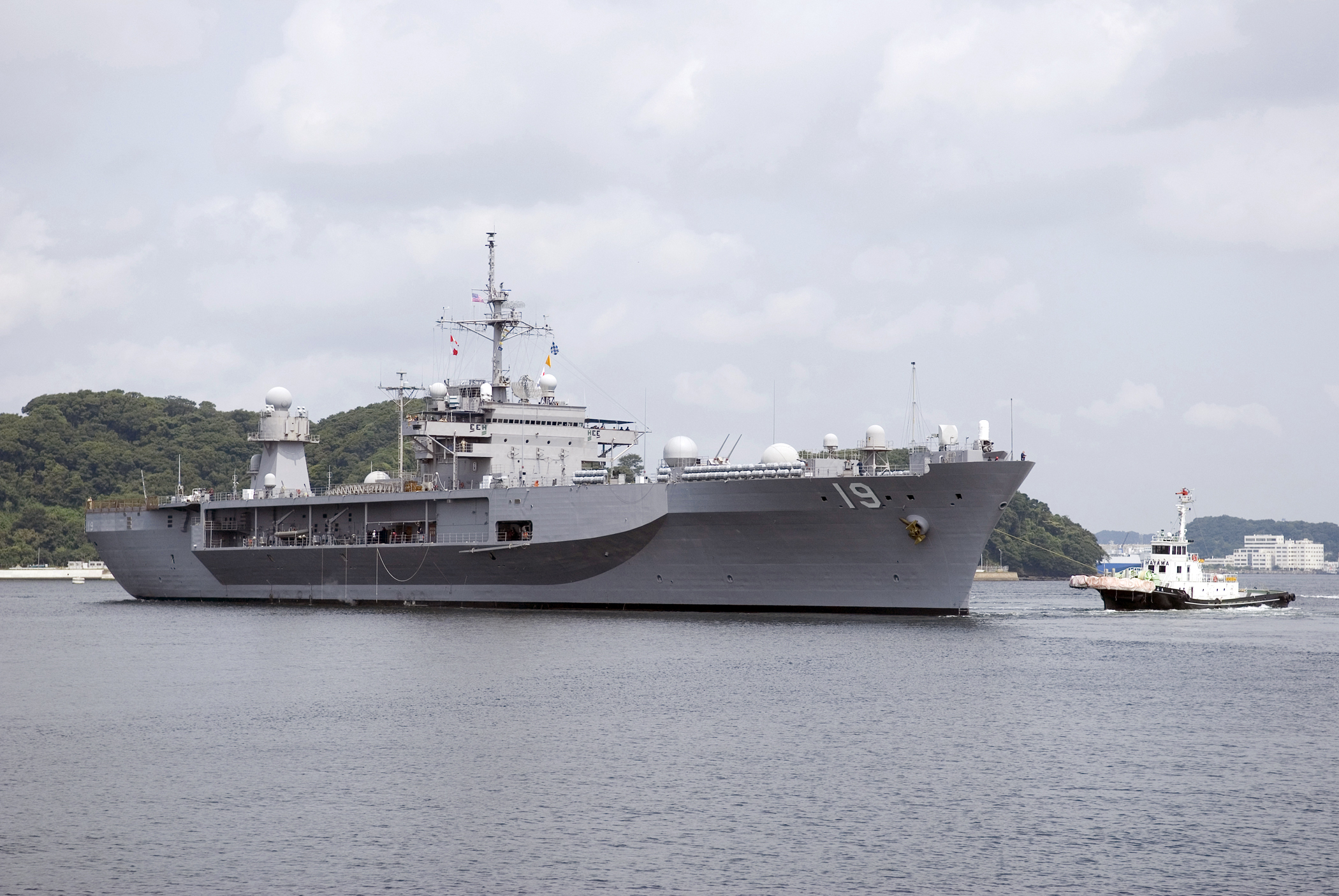
Blue Ridge about to depart Yokosuka, 13 August 2008.

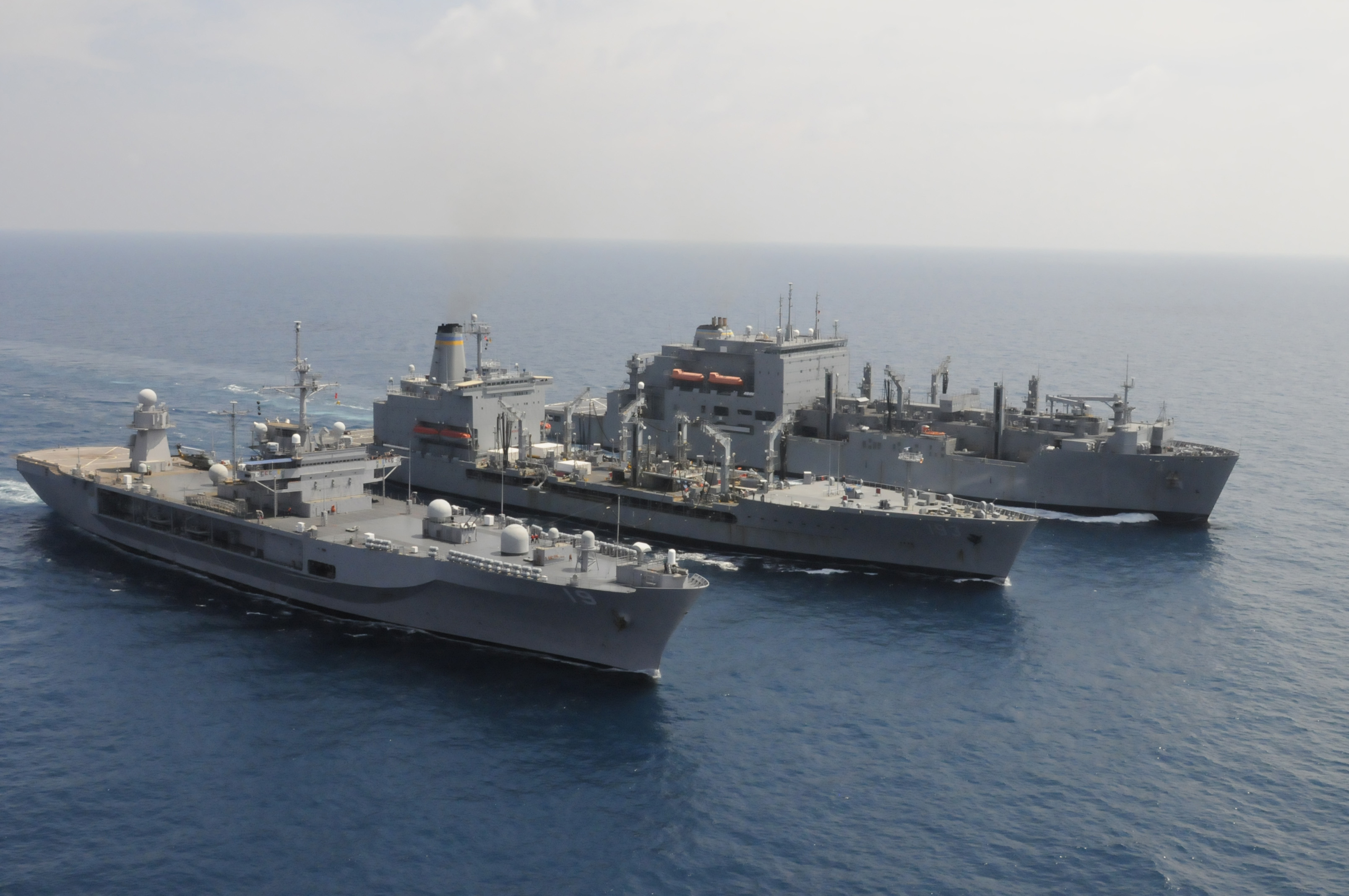
Blue Ridge with Walter S. Diehl and Richard E. Byrd, 23 October 2009.

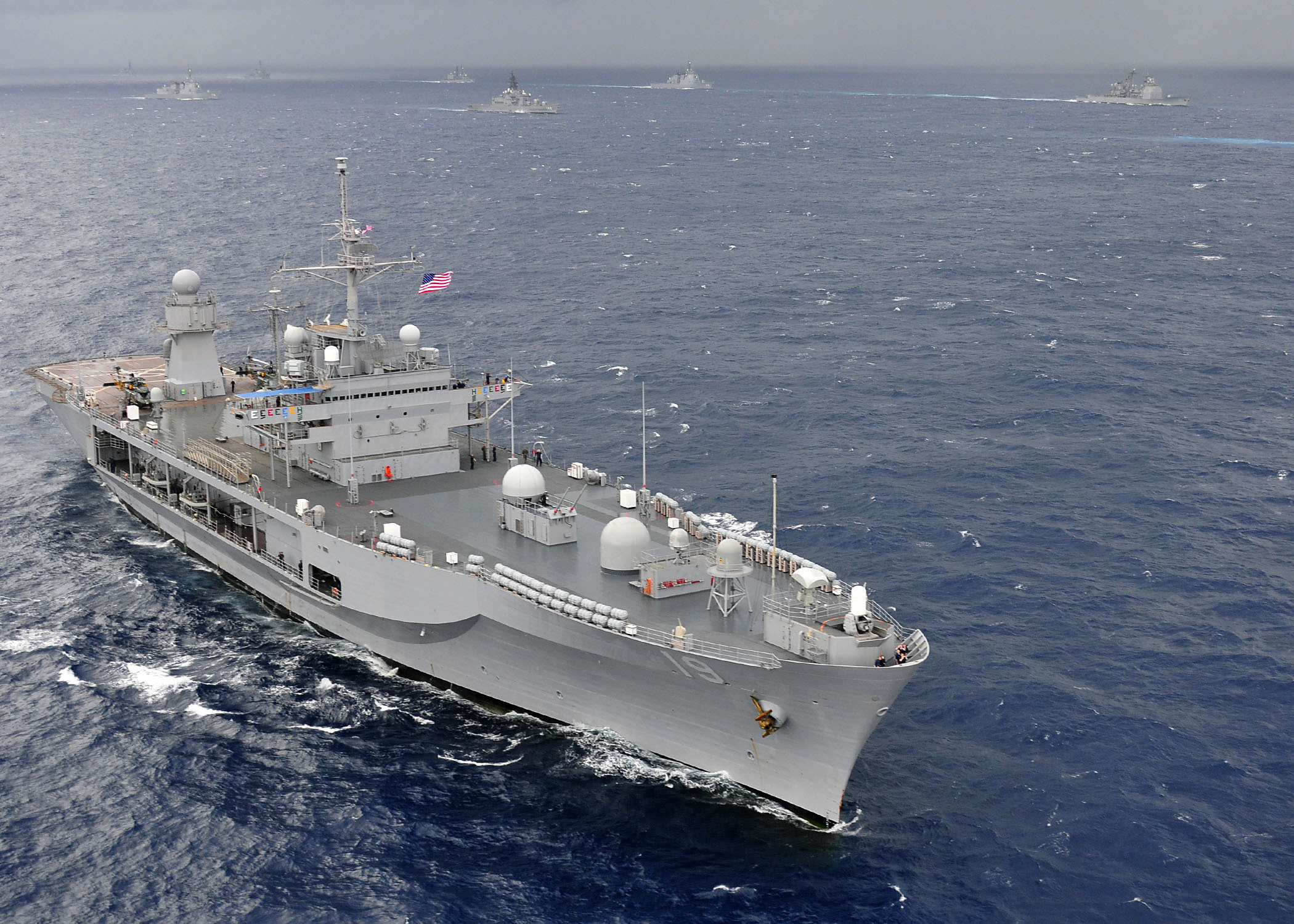
A 17 November 2009 photo showing Blue Ridge's clean topside configuration, various SATCOM antennas and a view of both embarked helicopters in their parking spots.

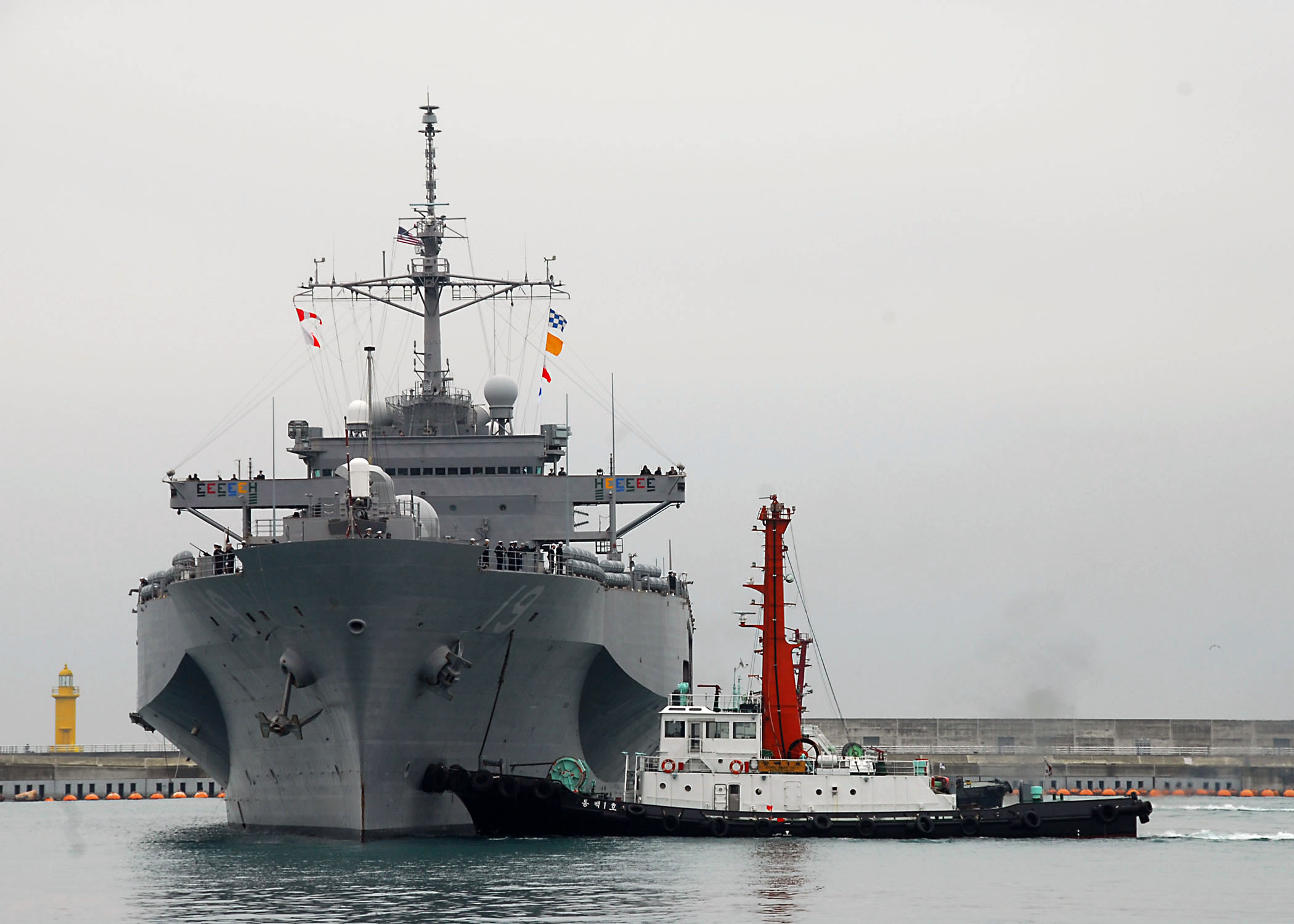
Blue Ridge arrives in Busan, South Korea, 5 March 2010.

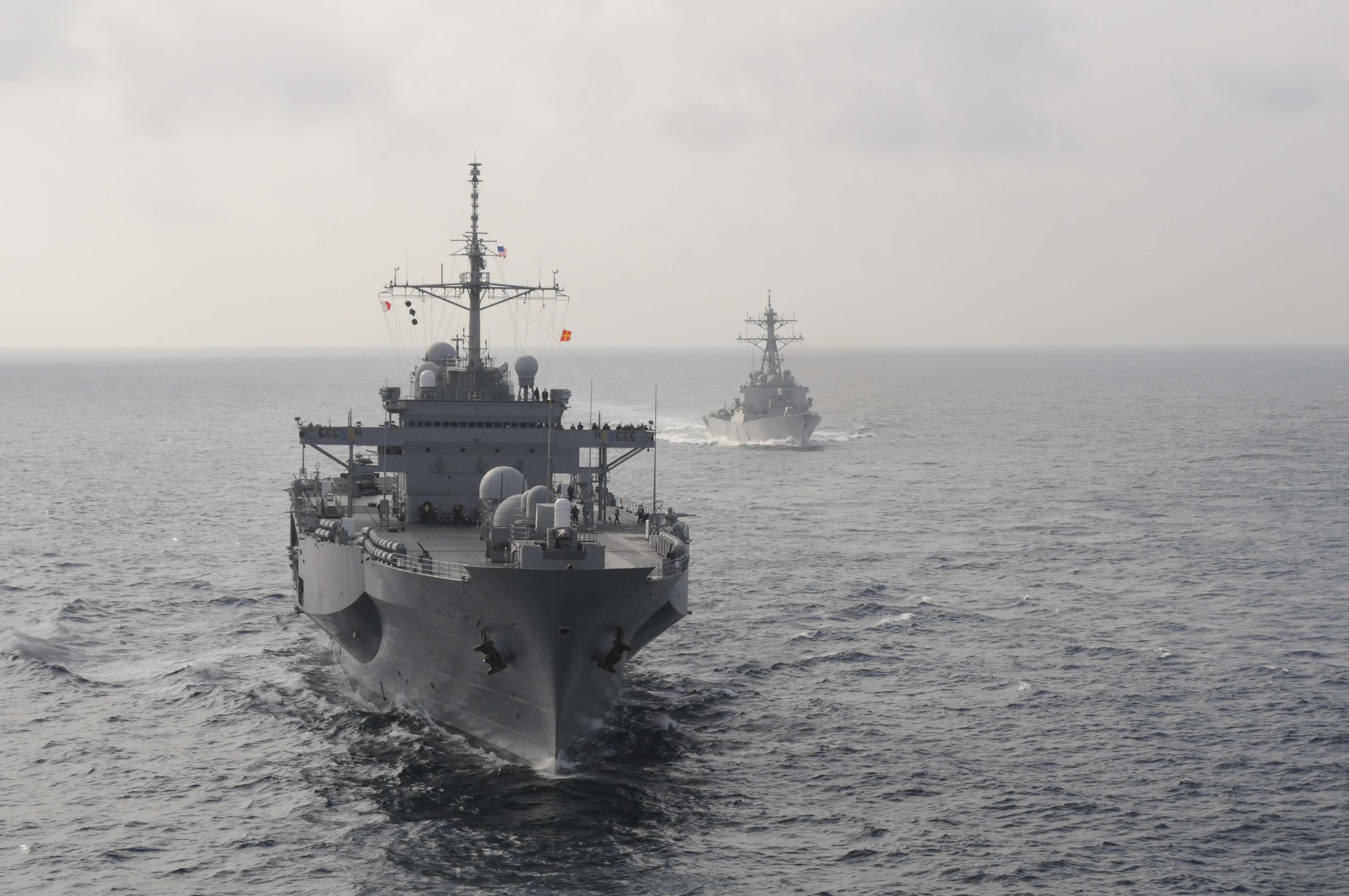
Blue Ridge escorted by Stethem, 18 February 2011.

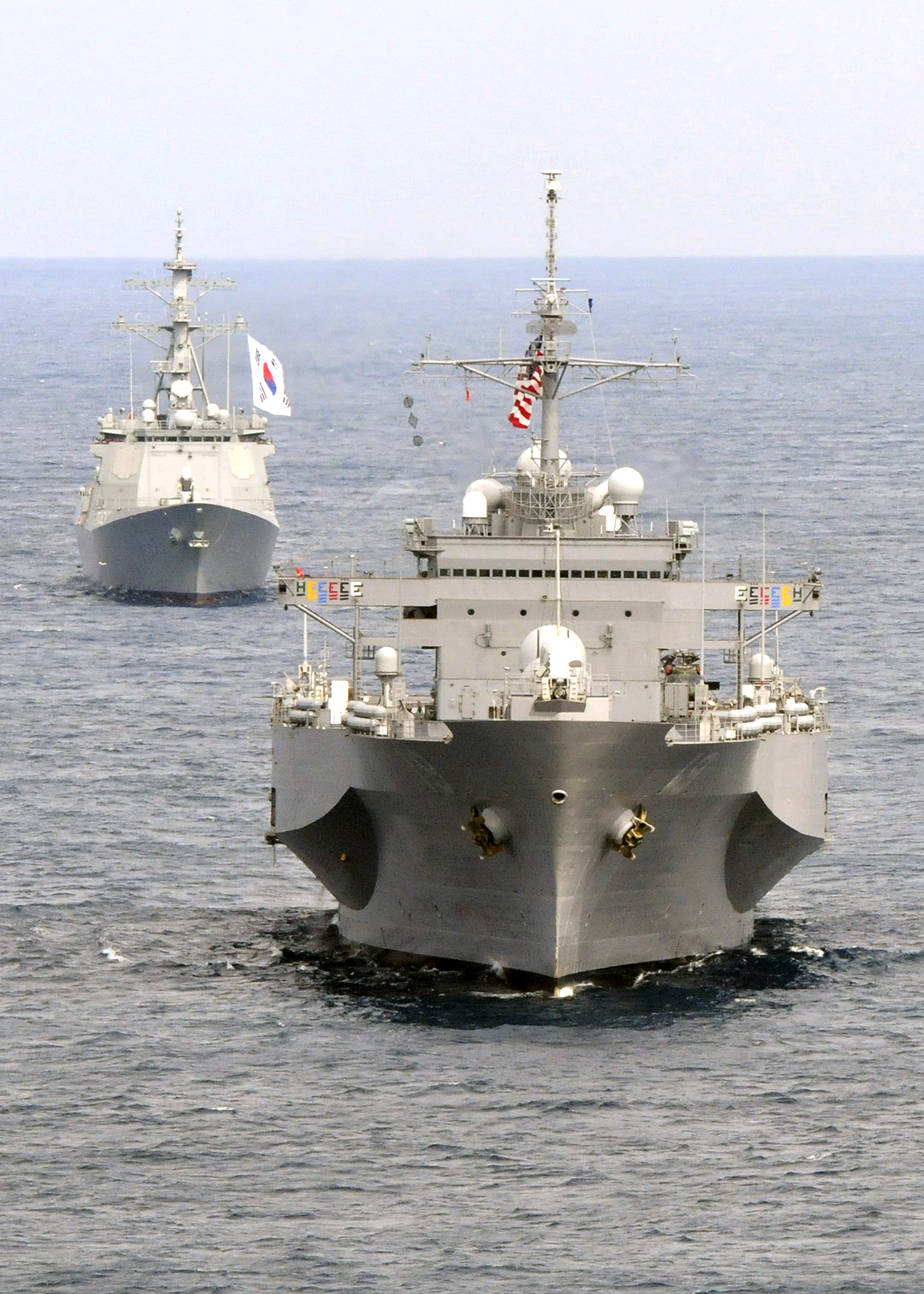
Blue Ridge escorted by South Korean destroyer ROKS Yulgok Yi I, 6 March 2012.

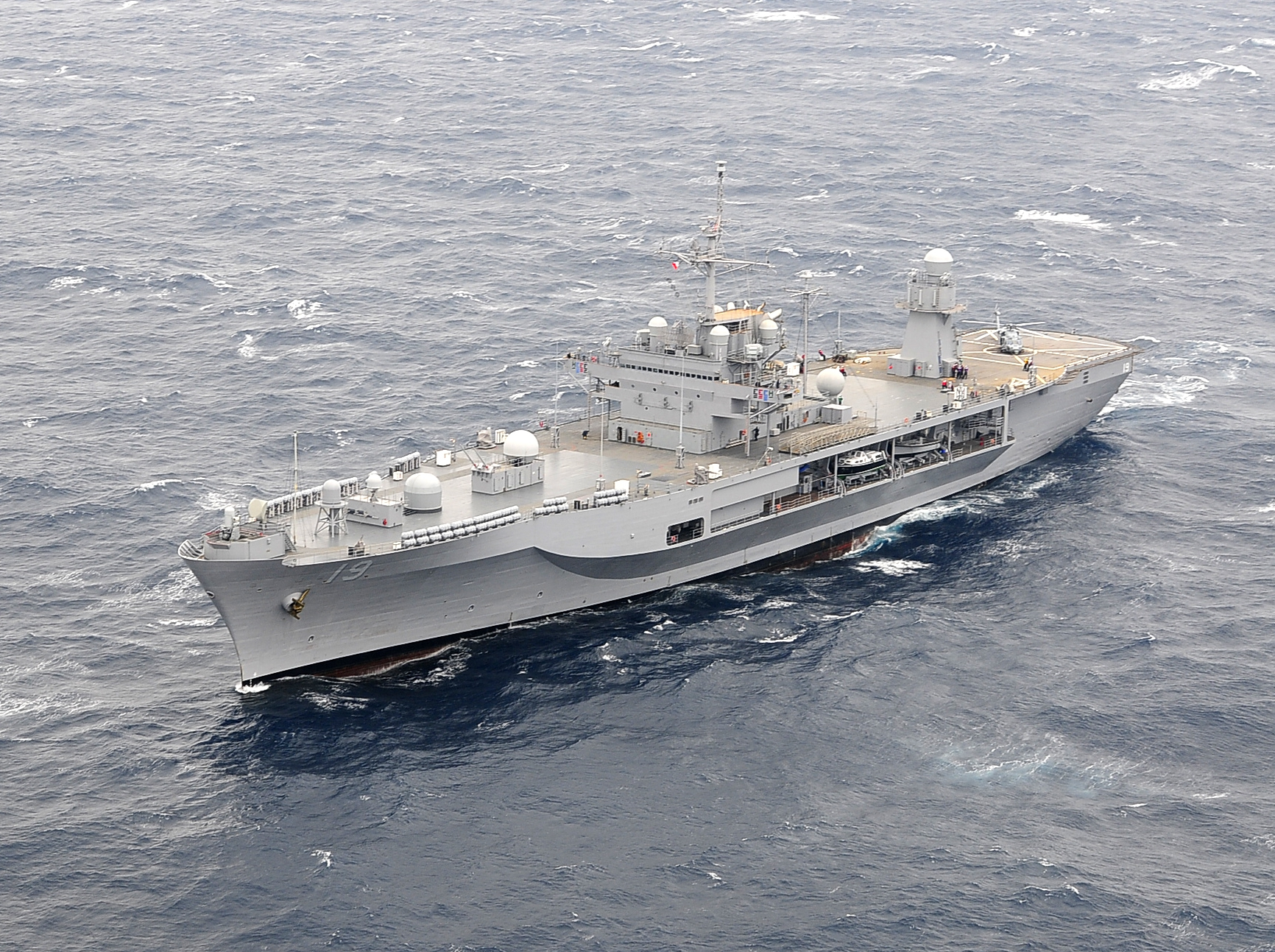
Blue Ridge in the South China Sea, 11 March 2014.

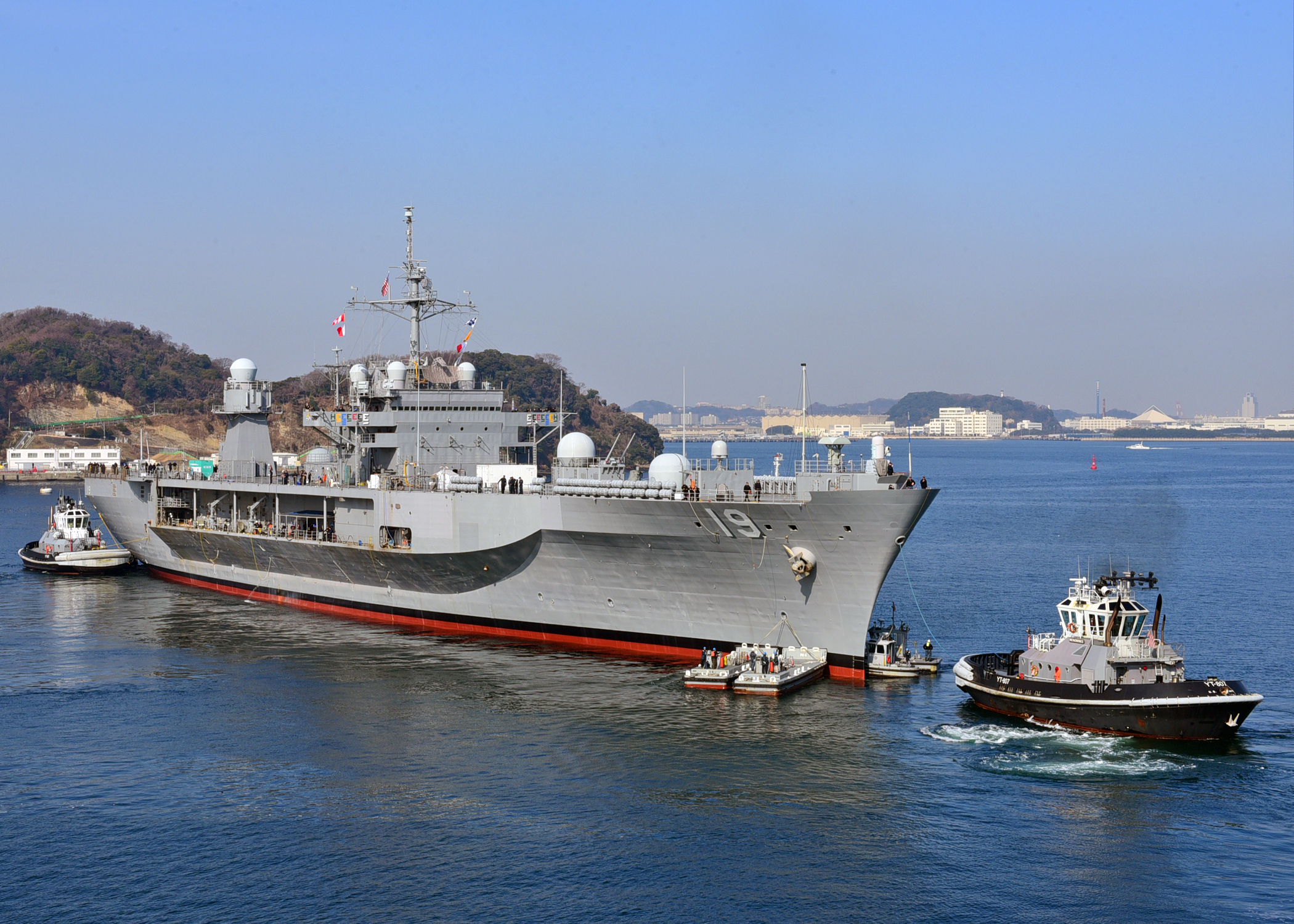
Blue Ridge in Yokosuka, 21 January 2018.

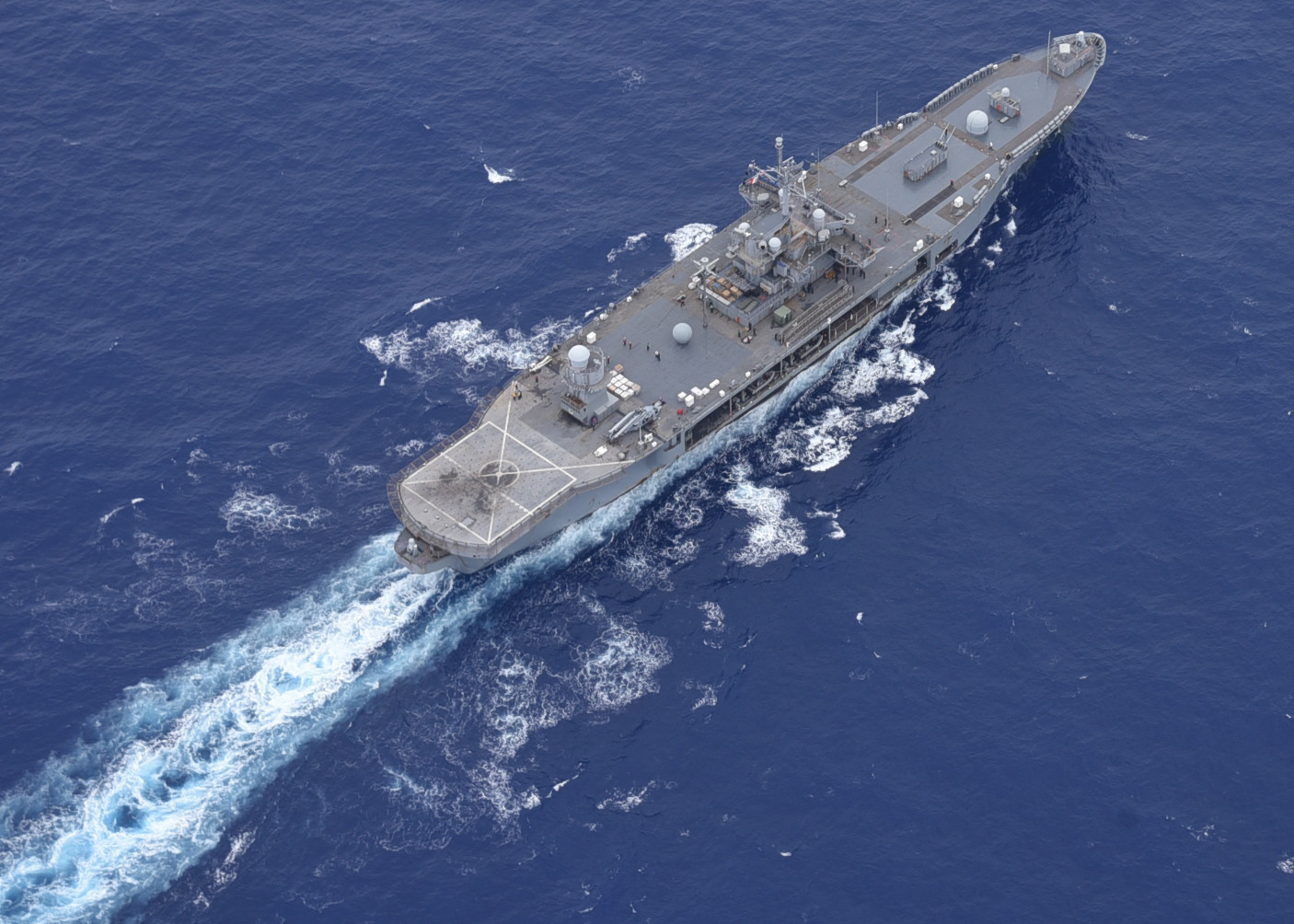
Aerial view of Blue Ridge on 1 May 2020.

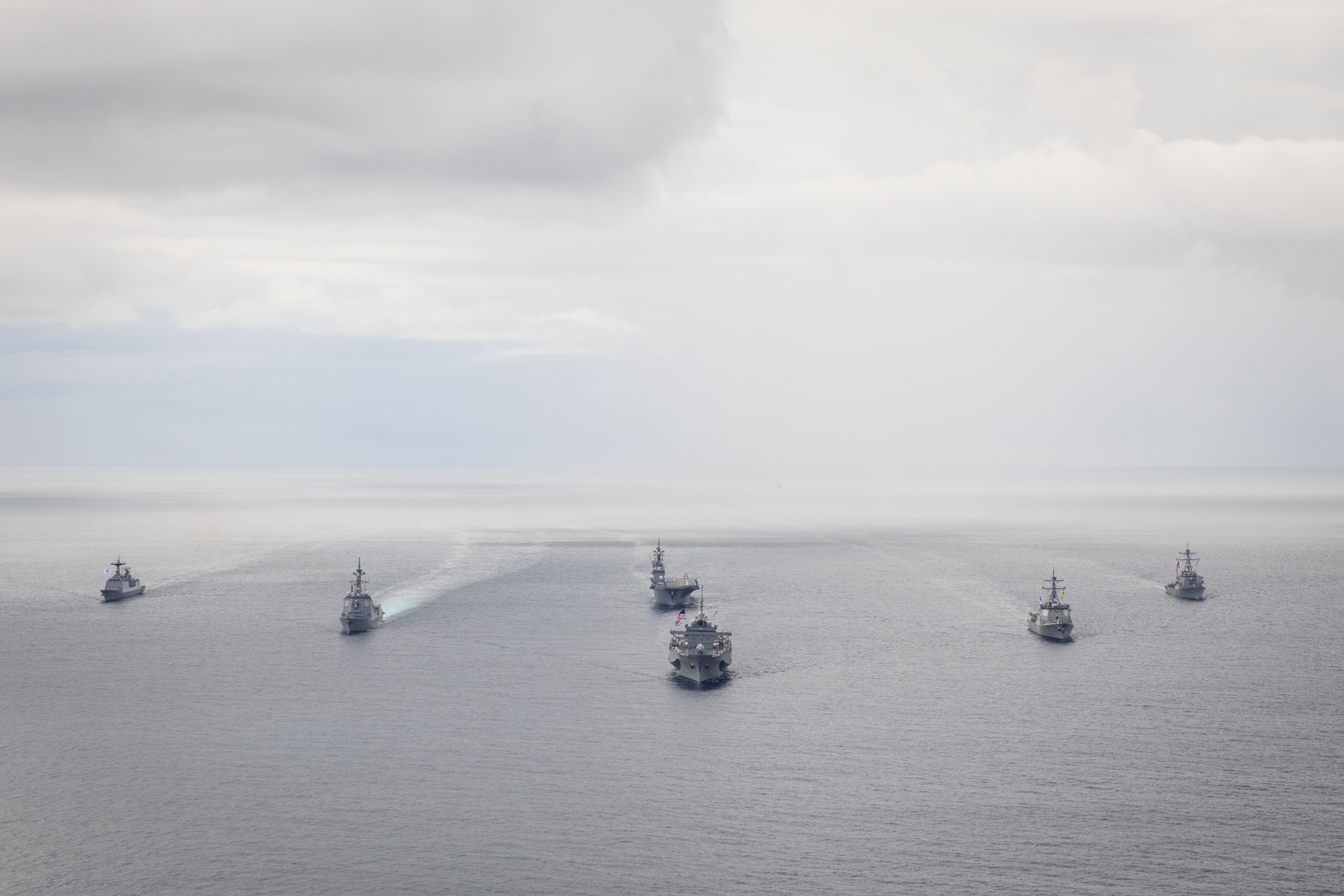
Blue Ridge (center) with the navy ships (from left to right) ROKS Wang Geon, JS Haguro, JS Hyūga, ROKS Yulgok Yi I, and Curtis Wilbur, 16 September 2025.

Preceded by USS Denver (LPD-9)	Oldest active combat ship of the United States Navy; 2014–	Succeeded by Incumbent
