= Deaths in August 2019 =

The following is a list of notable deaths in August 2019.

Entries for each day are listed alphabetically by surname. A typical entry lists information in the following sequence:

- Name, age, country of citizenship at birth, subsequent country of citizenship (if applicable), reason for notability, cause of death (if known), and reference.

== August 2019 ==
=== 1 ===
- Levan Aleksidze, 93, Georgian legal scholar.
- Marilynn Alsdorf, 94, American art collector.
- Munir Al Yafi, 44–45, Yemeni military commander (Southern Movement), missile attack.
- Gordon Brand Jnr, 60, Scottish golfer, heart attack.
- William Brown, 74, British academic, Master of Darwin College (2000–2012).
- Puși Dinulescu, 76, Romanian playwright and film director, heart attack.
- Jack Dolbin, 70, American football player (Denver Broncos).
- Charles Fadley, 77, American physicist, cancer.
- Ian Gibbons, 67, English keyboardist (The Kinks), bladder cancer.
- Sadou Hayatou, 77, Cameroonian politician, Prime Minister (1991–1992).
- Annemarie Huber-Hotz, 70, Swiss politician, Federal Chancellor (2000–2007) and President of the Swiss Red Cross (since 2011), heart attack.
- Barry Hughart, 85, American author.
- Minoru Kamata, 80, Japanese baseball player (Osaka/Hanshin Tigers, Kintetsu Buffaloes), lung cancer.
- Margot Lovejoy, 88, American historian of art and technology, stroke.
- Francis Luiggi, 87, French Olympic bobsledder (1968).
- Martin Mayer, 91, American economist and writer (The Bankers), complications from Parkinson's disease.
- Abdirahman Omar Osman, 53, Somali politician, Minister of Commerce and Industry (2015–2017) and Mayor of Mogadishu (since 2018), bombing.
- Marjan Pečar, 78, Slovenian Olympic ski jumper.
- D. A. Pennebaker, 94, American documentary filmmaker (Dont Look Back, Monterey Pop, Ziggy Stardust and the Spiders from Mars).
- Günter Perleberg, 84, German sprint canoeist, Olympic champion (1960).
- Barrington Pheloung, 65, Australian composer (Inspector Morse).
- Maurice Pope, 93, British classical linguist.
- Georgios Pozidis, 63, Greek Olympic wrestler (1980, 1984).
- Milovan Minja Prelević, 49, Montenegrin football player (Budućnost, OFK Beograd) and manager (Hangzhou Wuyue Qiantang), heart attack.
- Harley Race, 76, American Hall of Fame professional wrestler (AWA, CSW) and trainer (Harley Race's Wrestling Academy), lung cancer.
- Anders P. Ravn, 71, Danish computer scientist.
- Sarat Saikia, 71, Indian politician, Assam Legislative Assembly (2001–2016).
- Ephraim M. Sparrow, 91, American fluid dynamicist.
- Llew Summers, 72, New Zealand sculptor.
- R. G. Tiedemann, 78, German historian.
- Jesus Tuquib, 89, Filipino Roman Catholic prelate, Archbishop of Cagayan de Oro (1988–2006).
- Richard Vyškovský, 90, Czech architect.
- Rodolfo Zapata, 87, Argentine singer.
- Ludwig Zeller, 92, Chilean poet.
- Zha Quanxing, 94, Chinese electrochemist.

=== 2 ===
- Bill Anderson, 81, Scottish strongman.
- Carl Bell, 71, American physician.
- Gunder Bengtsson, 73, Swedish football manager (IFK Göteborg, Panathinaikos, Feyenoord).
- David Bevington, 88, American literary scholar.
- Roberto Bodegas, 86, Spanish film director and screenwriter (Spaniards in Paris).
- Vahakn Dadrian, 93, Armenian-American sociologist and historian.
- Jerome Dove, 65, American football player (San Diego Chargers).
- Oluf Fuglerud, 94, Norwegian journalist and politician.
- Gildo, 79, Brazilian footballer (Palmeiras, Flamengo, Paranaense).
- Devadas Kanakala, 74, Indian actor (Chettu Kinda Pleader, Gang Leader, Pedababu).
- Dawid Kostecki, 38, Polish professional boxer, suicide by hanging.
- Max Marsille, 88, Belgian Olympic boxer (1952).
- Ai Morinaga, 38, Japanese manga artist (My Heavenly Hockey Club, Maniattemasu, Your and My Secret).
- Deepak Obhrai, 69, Tanzanian-born Canadian politician, MP (since 1997), liver cancer.
- Stuart O'Connell, 84, New Zealand Catholic bishop, Bishop of Rarotonga (1996–2011).
- Audrey Peters, 92, American actress (Love of Life).
- Schoschana Rabinovici, 86, French-born Lithuanian-Israeli Holocaust survivor and writer.
- Jocelyne Roy-Vienneau, 63, Canadian politician, Lieutenant Governor of New Brunswick (since 2014), cancer.
- Rob Storey, 83, New Zealand politician, MP (1984–1996), Minister of Transport (1990–1993).
- Alexandra Strelchenko, 82, Russian folk singer, People's Artist of the RSFSR (1984).
- Helen Young, 93, New Zealand broadcasting manager (RNZ Concert).
- Japanese convicted murderers, executed by hanging.
  - Koichi Shoji, 64.
  - Yasunori Suzuki, 50.

=== 3 ===
- Miklós Ambrus, 86, Hungarian water polo player, Olympic champion (1964).
- Katreese Barnes, 56, American musician (Juicy), musical director (Saturday Night Live) and songwriter ("Dick in a Box"), Emmy Award winner (2007), breast cancer.
- Henri Belolo, 82, French music producer (The Ritchie Family, Village People) and songwriter.
- Jean-Claude Bouttier, 74, French boxer and actor (Les Uns et les Autres).
- Cliff Branch, 71, American football player (Oakland Raiders).
- Steven Gubser, 47, American physicist, climbing accident.
- Basil Heatley, 85, British athlete, marathon world-record holder (1964) and Olympic silver medallist (1964).
- Nikolai Kardashev, 87, Russian astrophysicist (SETI), developer of the Kardashev scale.
- Sir Brian Lochore, 78, New Zealand Hall of Fame rugby union player and coach (national team, Wairarapa-Bush), bowel cancer.
- Joe Longthorne, 64, English singer and impressionist (Live from...), throat cancer.
- Damien Lovelock, 65, Australian musician (The Celibate Rifles), cancer.
- Léon Mbou Yembi, 73, Gabonese politician, Deputy (2006–2011), complications from diabetes.
- Vigilio Mich, 88, Italian Olympic cross-country skier (1956).
- Anne E. Monius, 55, American religious scholar.
- Kazuko Nakamura, 86, Chinese-born Japanese animator (Astro Boy).
- L. Brooks Patterson, 80, American lawyer and politician, County Executive of Oakland County, Michigan (since 1992), pancreatic cancer.
- Lewis Pérez, 74, Venezuelan politician, Secretary General of Acción Democrática (1998–2000) and Senator (1994–1999), heart attack.
- Thomas Remengesau Sr., 89, Palauan politician, President (1988–1989) and Vice President (1985–1988).
- John Philip Saklil, 59, Indonesian Roman Catholic prelate, Bishop of Timika (since 2003).
- Marcel Toader, 56, Romanian rugby union player (Steaua București, national team), heart attack.
- Mike Troy, 78, American swimmer, Olympic champion (1960), world-record holder – 200m butterfly (1959–1960).

=== 4 ===
- Thomas Baxter, 84, Australian rugby union player.
- Anwara Begum, 70, Bangladeshi politician, MP (1986–1988).
- Kanti Bhatt, 88, Indian Gujarati author and journalist.
- Norden Tenzing Bhutia, 69, Nepalese musician, throat cancer.
- Ernie Bowman, 84, American baseball player (San Francisco Giants).
- Prudencio Cardona, 67, Colombian boxer, world flyweight champion (1982).
- Jim Donlevy, 82, Canadian football coach (Alberta Golden Bears).
- Hiroshi Enatsu, 96, Japanese theoretical physicist.
- Andrea Fraunschiel, 64, Austrian politician, MP (2004-2005).
- André Goosse, 93, Belgian linguist.
- Thomas Gulotta, 75, American government official, County Executive of Nassau County, New York (1987–2001).
- Richard Johnson, 81, Irish judge.
- Steve Kahan, 79, American actor. (Lethal Weapon, Superman, Maverick)
- Ivo Lill, 66, Estonian glass artist.
- Jim Morgan, 79, Canadian politician, MHA (1972–1989).
- Ann Nelson, 61, American particle physicist, hiking accident.
- Harald Nickel, 66, German footballer, cancer.
- Nuon Chea, 93, Cambodian politician, Acting Prime Minister (1976) and chief ideologist of Khmer Rouge.
- Larry Rakestraw, 77, American football player (Chicago Bears).
- Stu Rosen, 80, American voice director and actor (Hulk Hogan's Rock 'n' Wrestling, The Legend of Prince Valiant, Fraggle Rock: The Animated Series), cancer.
- Willi Tokarev, 84, Russian-American singer-songwriter.
- Bob Wilber, 91, American jazz clarinetist and bandleader.

=== 5 ===
- Bruce Aikenhead, 95, Canadian aerospace engineer and physicist.
- Nesbit Bentley, 91, Fijian Olympic sailor.
- Erwin Bittmann, 91, Austrian Olympic rower (1948).
- Kaye Bondurant, 84, American politician.
- Rashiram Debbarma, Indian politician, MLA (1977–1998).
- Salinda Dissanayake, 61, Sri Lankan politician, MP (since 1994).
- John Ellison, 78, English bishop.
- Else Kollerud Furre, 96, Norwegian politician.
- Sidney Goldstein, 92, American demographer.
- Glen Greening, 71, Canadian politician.
- Lizzie Grey, 60, American rock musician (London, Spiders & Snakes), complications from Lewy body disease.
- Teresa Ha, 81, Hong Kong actress (Flower in the Rain, Big Brother Cheng, Killer Constable).
- Jimi Hope, 62, Togolese musician and painter.
- Inge Israel, 92, German-born Canadian poet and playwright.
- Sydney Jary, 95, British army officer.
- Josef Kadraba, 85, Czech footballer (Sparta Prague, Slavia Prague, national team).
- Bjorg Lambrecht, 22, Belgian racing cyclist, race crash.
- John Lowey, 61, English footballer (Sheffield Wednesday, Blackburn Rovers, Chester City).
- Tom McDougall, 76-77, Canadian politician.
- Russell Middlemiss, 90, Australian footballer (Geelong), stroke.
- Asif Mohseni, 84, Afghani marja'.
- Toni Morrison, 88, American author (The Bluest Eye, Song of Solomon, Beloved), Nobel laureate (1993), Pulitzer Prize winner (1988).
- Benjamin F. Register, 89, American lieutenant general.
- Jeffrey Tarrant, 63, American hedge fund investor, film producer and philanthropist, brain cancer.

=== 6 ===
- Kamal Boullata, 77, Palestinian artist and art historian.
- Rod Coleman, 93, New Zealand motorcycle racer.
- Krystyna Dańko, 102, Polish humanitarian, Righteous Among the Nations (1998).
- S. A. M. Hussain, 80, Indian politician, MLA (2001–2006).
- Danny Doyle, 79, Irish folk singer ("The Rare Ould Times").
- Tage Lundin, 85, Swedish Olympic biathlete.
- Mick Miller, 92, Australian police officer, Chief Commissioner of Victoria Police (1977–1987).
- Mrs YGP, 93, Indian educationist, founder and dean of the Padma Seshadri Bala Bhavan, cardiac arrest.
- Steve Parr, 92, English footballer (Liverpool).
- Alejandro Serrano, 86, Ecuadorian politician, Vice President (2005–2007).
- George F. Simmons, 94, American mathematician.
- Sushma Swaraj, 67, Indian politician, MP (1996–1999, 2009–2019), Chief Minister of Delhi (1998), Minister of External Affairs (2014–2019), cardiac arrest.
- George Whaley, 85, Australian actor (Stork) and film director.
- Zhuo Renxi, 88, Chinese chemist and academician (Chinese Academy of Sciences).

=== 7 ===
- Subby Anzaldo, 86, American politician.
- David Berman, 52, American singer-songwriter (Silver Jews, Purple Mountains) and poet (Actual Air), suicide by hanging.
- Helmut Bez, 88, German playwright.
- Chris Birch, 68, American politician, member of the Alaska House of Representatives (2017–2019) and Senate (since 2019), aortic dissection.
- Michel Che, 77, French chemist.
- Barbara Crane, 91, American photographer.
- Orlando Grootfaam, 44, Surinamese footballer (S.V. Robinhood).
- Donald F. Klein, 90, American psychiatrist.
- Patricia Louisianna Knop, 78, American screenwriter (Lady Oscar, 9½ Weeks, Siesta).
- Kary Mullis, 74, American biochemist, Nobel laureate (1993), pneumonia.
- J. Om Prakash, 92, Indian film director (Aap Ki Kasam, Aakhir Kyon?) and producer (Aandhi).
- Nancy Reddin Kienholz, 75, American artist.
- Rostislav Rybakov, 81, Russian writer.
- Herm Urenda, 81, American football player (Oakland Raiders).
- Fabio Zerpa, 90, Uruguayan parapsychologist and ufologist.

=== 8 ===
- Era. Anbarasu, 78, Indian politician, MP (1989–1996).
- Jacques Arnoux, 81, French Olympic racewalker (1960).
- Shamnad Basheer, 43, Indian legal scholar. (body discovered on this date)
- Cosmas Batubara, 80, Indonesian politician and activist, Minister of Manpower (1988–1993) and Housing (1978–1988), and member of People's Representative Council (1967–1978), cancer.
- Ernie Colón, 88, American comic book artist (Casper the Friendly Ghost, Richie Rich, Damage Control), cancer.
- Theodore L. Eliot Jr., 91, American diplomat, Ambassador to Afghanistan (1973–1978), heart disease.
- Malcolm T. Elliott, 73, Australian radio and television personality.
- Mark English, 85, American illustrator and painter.
- Bruce Hodgins, 88, Canadian academic historian and author.
- Lee Bennett Hopkins, 81, American educator and poet, chronic obstructive pulmonary disease.
- Jackie Jocko, 90, American musician.
- Stanisław Konturek, 87, Polish physiologist and gastroenterologist.
- Mazhar Krasniqi, 87, Yugoslavian-born New Zealand Muslim community leader.
- Charlach Mackintosh, 84, British Olympic alpine skier (1956, 1960).
- Manfred Max-Neef, 86, Chilean economist.
- Jean-Pierre Mocky, 90, French film director (Les Dragueurs, The Miracle), screenwriter and actor (The Abandoned).
- Dave Parks, 77, American football player (New Orleans Saints, San Francisco 49ers).
- Fabrizio Saccomanni, 76, Italian civil servant and economist, Minister of Economy and Finance (2013–2014), Director General of the Bank of Italy (2006–2013), heart attack.
- Les Strongman, 94, Canadian ice hockey player (Nottingham Panthers, Wembley Lions).
- Marius Todericiu, 49, Romanian football player (Brașov, Weismain) and manager (Darmstadt 98), suicide.
- Erling Wicklund, 75, Norwegian jazz trombonist and journalist.

=== 9 ===
- Ahmad Lai Bujang, 69, Malaysian politician, MP (2008–2018).
- José Desmarets, 93, Belgian politician, Minister of Defence (1979–1980).
- Mé Aboubacar Diomandé, 31, Ivorian footballer (Stella Club d'Adjamé).
- Rodney Falkson, 77, South African cricketer.
- Paul Findley, 98, American politician, member of the U.S. House of Representatives (1961–1983).
- Altair Gomes de Figueiredo, 81, Brazilian footballer (Fluminense, national team).
- Ronald Jones, 67, American conceptual artist.
- Fahrudin Jusufi, 79, Serbian football player (Partizan, Eintracht Frankfurt, Yugoslavia national team), Olympic champion (1960) and manager.
- Oscar Malbernat, 75, Argentinian football player (Estudiantes de la Plata, national team) and manager.
- Bill Mills, 99, American baseball player (Philadelphia Athletics).
- Gerry Murray, 98, American roller derby skater.
- Huw O. Pritchard, 91, Welsh-born Canadian chemist.
- Barry Stroud, 84, Canadian philosopher, brain cancer.
- Claudio Taddei, 52, Swiss singer and plastic artist.
- Sir Michael Uren, 95, British businessman and philanthropist.
- Panayiotis Vassilakis, 93, Greek sculptor.
- Hendricus Vogels, 76, Dutch-born Australian Olympic cyclist (1964).

=== 10 ===
- Bao Kexin, 67, Chinese politician and business executive, Vice Governor of Guizhou Province (2002–2007).
- Joseph Begich, 89, American politician, member of the Minnesota House of Representatives (1975–1993).
- Freda Dowie, 91, English actress (Distant Voices, Still Lives, The Old Curiosity Shop, The Omen).
- Jeffrey Epstein, 66, American financier (Bear Stearns), philanthropist (Jeffrey Epstein VI Foundation) and convicted sex offender, suicide by hanging.
- Jim Forbes, 95, Australian politician, MP (1956–1975), Minister for Health (1966–1971) and Immigration (1971–1972), Military Cross recipient.
- Michael Hall, 84, English cricketer (Nottinghamshire).
- Edward H. Jennings, 82, American academic administrator, President of the University of Wyoming (1979–1981) and the Ohio State University (1981–1990, 2002).
- Igor Kachmazov, 50, Russian footballer (Spartak Ordzhonikidze, Spartak Vladikavkaz, Lokomotiv St. Petersburg).
- Uno Kajak, 86, Estonian Olympic skier.
- Aïssata Kane, 80, Mauritanian politician.
- Radoslav Katičić, 89, Croatian linguist.
- Jo Lancaster, 100, British RAF pilot.
- Cándido Sibilio, 60, Dominican-born Spanish Olympic basketball player (1980).
- Ann Barr Snitow, 76, American writer (Dissent), cancer.
- Piero Tosi, 92, Italian costume designer (Senso, Yesterday, Today and Tomorrow, The Night Porter), Honorary Oscar winner (2013).
- Bernard Unabali, 62, Papua New Guinean Roman Catholic prelate, Bishop of Bougainville (since 2009).
- Marty Wood, 86, Canadian Hall of Fame rodeo cowboy, cancer.
- Wu Ningkun, 98, Chinese writer and translator.

=== 11 ===
- Bluey Adams, 84, Australian footballer (Melbourne), cancer.
- Freddy Bannister, 84, English rock concert promoter, cancer.
- Tred Barta, 67, American hunter (The Best and Worst of Tred Barta).
- Kent J. Carroll, 92, American vice admiral.
- Doug Clarke, 85, English footballer (Hull City).
- John Coffey, 101, Irish hurler (Tipperary, Boherlahan-Dualla).
- Jim Cullum Jr., 77, American jazz cornetist, broadcaster (Riverwalk Jazz) and music preservationist.
- Dejan Čurović, 51, Serbian footballer (Partizan, Vitesse), leukaemia.
- John Dillon, 76, Scottish footballer (Albion Rovers).
- Kerry Downes, 88, English architectural historian.
- Darryl Drake, 62, American football player (Washington Redskins) and coach (Chicago Bears, Pittsburgh Steelers).
- Michael E. Krauss, 84, American linguist.
- Ningali Lawford, 52, Australian actress (Bran Nue Dae, Last Cab to Darwin), asthma attack.
- Shelby Lyman, 83, American chess player and commentator.
- Geoff Malcolm, 88, New Zealand physical chemist (Massey University).
- Barbara March, 65, Canadian actress (Star Trek), cancer.
- Walter Martínez, 37, Honduran footballer (Victoria, Beijing Guoan, national team), heart attack.
- László Máté, 67, Hungarian politician, MP (1994–1998).
- Gordan Mihić, 80, Serbian screenwriter (Black Cat, White Cat, Time of the Gypsies, Balkan Express).
- Frederick Reif, 92, American physicist.
- Sergio Obeso Rivera, 87, Mexican Roman Catholic cardinal, Bishop of Papantla (1971–1974) and Archbishop of Xalapa (1979–2007).
- Gordon Rowley, 98, British botanist and writer.
- Harvey Sand, 92, American politician.
- Charles Santore, 84, American children's book and magazine illustrator (TV Guide).
- J. Neil Schulman, 66, American novelist, pulmonary embolism.
- Emil Svoboda, 90, Czech footballer (Sparta Prague, Czechoslovakia national team).

=== 12 ===
- DJ Arafat, 33, Ivorian disc jockey and musician, traffic collision.
- João Carlos Barroso, 69, Brazilian actor, pancreatic cancer.
- José Luis Brown, 62, Argentinian football player (Estudiantes de la Plata, national team) and manager, World Cup winner (1986), complications from Alzheimer's disease.
- Jean-Paul Capelle, 74, French Olympic field hockey player (1968).
- Krishna Chandra Chunekar, 90/91, Indian ayurvedic practitioner.
- Danny Cohen, 81, Israeli-American Hall of Fame computer scientist.
- Florin Halagian, 80, Romanian football player (Dinamo București) and manager (Argeș Pitești, national team).
- Reuven Hammer, 86, American-Israeli rabbi and journalist (The Jerusalem Post).
- Terence Knapp, 87, English actor (Urge to Kill, The Valiant, Othello).
- Rahul Kukreti, 43, American cricketer.
- Robyn Léwis, 89, Welsh author, politician and archdruid, Vice President of Plaid Cymru (1970–1976).
- Lu Yonggen, 88, Chinese agronomist and plant geneticist, President of South China Agricultural University (1983–1995).
- Jim Marsh, 73, American basketball player (Portland Trail Blazers) and broadcaster (Seattle SuperSonics).
- Paule Marshall, 90, American writer.
- Hussein Salem, 85, Egyptian-Spanish businessman.
- Mizanur Rahman Shelley, 76, Bangladeshi politologist and politician, brain haemorrhage.
- John Michael Sherlock, 93, Canadian Roman Catholic prelate, Bishop of London, Ontario (1978–2002).
- Jan Simonsen, 66, Norwegian politician, MP (1989–2005), cancer.
- Michael T. Sangma, 41, Indian politician, MLA (2013–2018), heart attack.
- Frank Tsao, 94, Chinese-born Malaysian-Singaporean shipping magnate and philanthropist, kidney failure.

=== 13 ===
- Kip Addotta, 75, American comedian.
- Josette Arène, 95, French Olympic swimmer (1948, 1952).
- Norman Barasch, 97, American playwright.
- Cecilia Caballero Blanco, 105, Colombian socialite, First Lady (1974–1978).
- Umesh Bhat Bhavikeri, 72, Indian politician, MLA (1989–1994).
- Gerald Geistweidt, 71, American politician.
- Guo Zhenqian, 86, Chinese politician and banker, Governor of Hubei (1985–1990), Vice Governor of the People's Bank of China (1990–1993), Auditor General (1994–1998).
- Lily Leung, 90, Hong Kong actress (In the Realm of Fancy, Bar Bender, Lives of Omission), cancer.
- Tim Means, 75, American environmentalist, complications from diabetes.
- Vladimír Ptáček, 64, Czech Olympic basketball player (1976).
- Brunilda Ruiz, 83, American ballet dancer.
- Carole Satyamurti, 80, British poet.
- René Taelman, 74, Belgian football manager (Burkina Faso national team, JS Kabylie, Akhdar), lung cancer.
- Nadia Toffa, 40, Italian journalist and television presenter (Le Iene), brain cancer.

=== 14 ===
- Tõnu Aav, 80, Estonian actor (The Lark, Õnne 13).
- Suleiman Bakhit, 41, Jordanian entrepreneur and comics writer.
- Carrol Boyes, 65, South African artist and executive.
- Águeda Dicancro, 80, Uruguayan sculptor.
- Polly Farmer, 84, Australian footballer (Geelong).
- Brian Job, 67, American swimmer, Olympic bronze medalist (1968).
- Ivo Malec, 94, Croatian-born French composer.
- Karim Olowu, 95, Nigerian Olympic sprinter and long jumper (1952, 1956).
- Liam Ó Tuama, 87, Irish hurler and Gaelic footballer.
- Héctor Rivoira, 59, Argentine football player (Almirante Brown) and manager (Quilmes, Atlético Tucumán), cancer.
- Ugo Sansonetti, 100, Italian writer and masters athlete.
- Reginald Scarlett, 84, Jamaican cricketer (national team).
- Ben Unwin, 41, Australian actor (Home and Away).
- Helena Wilsonová, 81, Czech photographer.
- Gjergj Xhuvani, 55, Albanian film director (Slogans, East, West, East: The Final Sprint) screenwriter and producer.

=== 15 ===
- Lalbihari Bhattacharya, 81, Indian politician, MLA (1982–1987).
- V. B. Chandrasekhar, 57, Indian cricketer (Tamil Nadu, Goa, national team), heart attack.
- Claire Cloninger, 77, American Christian songwriter and author.
- Roberta F. Colman, 81, American biochemist.
- Madan Mani Dixit, 96, Nepalese writer, pneumonia.
- Vladimir Fomichyov, 59, Russian footballer (Kuban Krasnodar, Dynamo Moscow, Kuzbass Kemerovo).
- Samuel Gelfman, 88, American film producer, complications from heart and respiratory disease.
- Luigi Lunari, 85, Italian writer.
- Eddie Marlin, 89, American professional wrestler and promoter (CWA), multiple organ failure.
- Bill Parker, 91, American broadcaster.
- Noel Pope, 87, New Zealand politician, Mayor of Tauranga (1983–1989, 1995–2001).
- Qin Hanzhang, 111, Chinese engineer and food scientist, heart attack.
- Antonio Rastrelli, 91, Italian politician, MP (1979–1995) and President of Campania (1995–1999).
- Vidya Sinha, 71, Indian actress (Rajnigandha, Chhoti Si Baat, Qubool Hai), respiratory failure.
- Glenn Tasker, 67, Australian sports administrator, President of the Australian Paralympic Committee (2013–2018).
- Dalton Truax, 84, American football player (Green Bay Packers, New York Giants, Oakland Raiders).
- Henrik Westman, 78, Swedish politician.
- Wrestling Pro, 81, American professional wrestler (GCCW).

=== 16 ===
- Nelson Ball, 77, Canadian poet, euthanasia.
- Gustavo Barreiro, 60, Cuban-born American politician, member of the Florida House of Representatives (1998–2006), heart attack.
- Jaime Batres, 55, Guatemalan Olympic footballer.
- Roland Peter Brown, 93, American physician.
- Princess Christina of the Netherlands, 72, Dutch royal, bone cancer.
- Bruce Deans, 58, New Zealand rugby union player (Canterbury, national team), cancer.
- Peter Fonda, 79, American actor (Easy Rider, Ulee's Gold, 3:10 to Yuma) and screenwriter, lung cancer.
- Tommy Furlong, 88, Irish Gaelic footballer and hurler.
- Felice Gimondi, 76, Italian racing cyclist, Tour de France (1965), Vuelta a España (1968) and Giro d'Italia (1967, 1969, 1976) winner, heart attack.
- Jim Hardy, 96, American football player (Los Angeles Rams, Chicago Cardinals, Detroit Lions) and sporting executive.
- C. S. Holling, 88, Canadian ecologist.
- David Layzer, 93, American astrophysicist.
- Sahura Mallick, 85, Indian politician, MLA (1974–1977), (1980–1985) and (1995–2000).
- Faisal Masud, 64, Pakistani doctor and professor, cardiac arrest.
- Mike McGee, 80, American football player (St. Louis Cardinals), sporting executive and athletic director (University of South Carolina).
- José Nápoles, 79, Cuban-born Mexican Hall of Fame boxer, world welterweight champion (1969–1970, 1971–1975).
- Anna Quayle, 86, British actress (Grange Hill, Chitty Chitty Bang Bang, A Hard Day's Night), Tony winner (1963), Lewy body dementia.
- Rizia Rahman, 79, Indian-born Bangladeshi novelist.
- Bobby Smith, 78, English footballer (Barnsley, Chelmsford City).
- Alexandre Soares dos Santos, 83, Portuguese businessman, CEO and President of Jerónimo Martins (1969–2013).
- Penka Stoyanova, 69, Bulgarian basketball player, Olympic silver medallist (1980) and bronze medallist (1976).
- Alla Ter-Sarkisiants, 82, Russian historian.
- Gregor Trinkaus-Randall, 73, American archivist.
- Richard Williams, 86, Canadian-British animator and director (The Thief and the Cobbler, Who Framed Roger Rabbit, A Christmas Carol), three-time Oscar winner, cancer.

=== 17 ===
- Damodar Ganesh Bapat, 84, Indian social worker.
- Cedric Benson, 36, American football player (Texas Longhorns, Cincinnati Bengals, Chicago Bears), traffic collision.
- Lucille Baldwin Brown, 97, American librarian.
- Walter Buser, 93, Swiss politician, Chancellor (1981–1991).
- Allen Church, 91, American alpine skiing sports official.
- Jacques Diouf, 81, Senegalese diplomat, Director General of the Food and Agriculture Organization (1994–2011).
- Ronald Gray, 87, Australian Olympic athlete (1956).
- Rosemary Kuhlmann, 97, American mezzo-soprano and actress.
- Donald A. B. Lindberg, 85, American mathematician, Director of the United States National Library of Medicine (1984–2015), fall.
- José A. Martínez Suárez, 93, Argentine film director (Yesterday's Guys Used No Arsenic) and screenwriter, pneumonia.
- Bill McDonagh, 91, Canadian ice hockey player (New York Rangers).
- Thelma Nava, 87, Mexican poet and journalist.
- Ivan Oman, 89, Slovenian politician, independence key figure and farmer, MP (1992-1996.
- Teodoro Palacios, 80, Guatemalan Olympic high jumper (1968), pneumonia.
- Suffian Rahman, 41, Malaysian footballer (Negeri Sembilan, Melaka Telekom, national team), heart attack.
- Neelum Sharma, 50, Indian anchorwoman (Doordarshan), cancer.
- Stephen Siklos, 69, British mathematician, cancer.
- Tabu Taid, 77, Indian educationist.
- Lawrence Van Huizen, 89, Malaysian Olympic hockey player (1964).
- Camillo Zanolli, 89, Italian Olympic skier (1956).

=== 18 ===
- Soma Bhupala, 92, Indian politician, MLA (1962–1977).
- Barbara Hibbs Blake, 82, American mammologist, complications from a stroke.
- Kathleen Blanco, 76, American politician, Governor (2004–2008) and Lieutenant Governor of Louisiana (1996–2004), member of the Louisiana House (1984–1989), ocular melanoma.
- Giulio Chierchini, 91, Italian comics writer and artist.
- Gary Cooper, 80, English rugby league football player and coach.
- René Feller, 76, Dutch football manager.
- Helmuth Froschauer, 85, Austrian choral conductor.
- Conrad Gorinsky, 83, Guyanese-born British chemist.
- Gillian Hanna, 75, Irish actress (Les Misérables, All the Queen's Men, Oliver Twist), autoimmune disease.
- Chad Holt, 46, American writer and actor.
- Denis Kuljiš, 67, Croatian writer and journalist.
- Karel Kuklík, 82, Czech photographer.
- Robert Ouko, 70, Kenyan runner, Olympic champion (1972).
- Encarna Paso, 88, Spanish actress (Begin the Beguine), pneumonia.
- Peter H. Reill, 80, American historian.
- Paul Smith, 88, American baseball player (Pittsburgh Pirates, Chicago Cubs).
- Nate Smith, 84, American baseball player (Baltimore Orioles).
- Sasson Somekh, 86, Iraqi-born Israeli writer and translator.
- Jack Whitaker, 95, American sportscaster (CBS, ABC), The NFL Today host (1971–1974).
- Yu Zhengui, 73, Chinese historian and scholar of Islam, Vice President of the Islamic Association of China.

=== 19 ===
- James R. Alexander, 88, American sound engineer (Coal Miner's Daughter, Terms of Endearment, Weird Science).
- Bai Yan, 99, Chinese-born Singaporean actor, pneumonia.
- Benjamin N. Bellis, 95, American air force lieutenant general.
- Barry Bennett, 63, American football player (New Orleans Saints, New York Jets, Minnesota Vikings), shot.
- Jim Dunne, 87, American test-track engineer and journalist.
- Mel Frederick, 89, American politician.
- George Ganchev, 79, Bulgarian politician, MP (1995–2001).
- Matilda Hansen, 89, American politician.
- Zakir Hussain, 85, Pakistani field hockey player, Olympic champion (1968) and silver medallist (1956).
- Al Jackson, 83, American baseball player (Pittsburgh Pirates, New York Mets, St. Louis Cardinals).
- Mohammed Zahur Khayyam, 92, Indian music director and composer (Kabhie Kabhie, Umrao Jaan, Dil-e-Nadaan), lung infection.
- Enn Kokk, 82, Swedish politician and journalist.
- Lars Larsen, 71, Danish retailer, founder of Jysk, liver cancer.
- Mike Leaf, 58, American college basketball coach (Winona State).
- Philippe Leroy, 79, French politician, Senator (2001–2017).
- Gina Lopez, 65, Filipino environmentalist, Secretary of Environment and Natural Resources (2016–2017), brain cancer.
- Pertti Mäkipää, 78, Finnish footballer (TaPa, Upon Pallo, national team).
- Zbigniew Makowski, 89, Polish painter.
- John Matthews, 91, Australian politician, member of the New South Wales Legislative Council (1981–1991).
- Jagannath Mishra, 82, Indian politician, Chief Minister of Bihar (1975–1977, 1980–1983, 1989–1990).
- Jack Perkins, 85, American reporter and television host (NBC Nightly News, Biography).
- Carlos Porrata, c. 73, Puerto Rican television personality.
- David Rubinstein, 86, American social historian.
- Jan Ruff O'Herne, 96, Australian comfort women rights activist.
- Bette Stephenson, 95, Canadian physician and politician.
- Larry Taylor, 77, American bass guitarist (Canned Heat), cancer.
- Kazuo Wada, 90, Japanese business executive, Chairman of Yaohan.

=== 20 ===
- Mikhail Abramov, 55, Russian businessman, founder and owner of the Museum of Russian Icons, helicopter crash.
- Colin Beard, 77, Australian football player (South Fremantle, Richmond) and manager.
- Richard Booth, 80, Welsh bookseller.
- Giovanni Buttarelli, 62, Italian civil servant, European Data Protection Supervisor (since 2014).
- Russ Conway, 70, American sports journalist (The Eagle-Tribune) and hockey beat writer (Boston Bruins).
- Rudolf Hundstorfer, 67, Austrian trade unionist and politician, president of the Austrian Trade Union Federation, heart attack.
- Peter Knobel, 76, American rabbi.
- Ernesto Lariosa, 74, Filipino writer and poet, liver failure.
- Li Houwen, 92, Chinese surgeon, President of China Medical University.
- Harry B. Luthi, 85, American businessman, Mayor of Greenville, South Carolina (1982–1983).
- John H. McArthur, 85, Canadian-American academic, Dean of the Harvard Business School (1980–1995).
- Alexandra Nazarova, 79, Russian actress (But What If This Is Love, Sofiya Perovskaya, Air Crew), People's Artist of Russia (2001).
- S. Lester Ralph, 88, American clergyman and politician.
- Lico Reyes, 73, Mexican-American actor (Problem Child) and politician.
- Larry Siegel, 93, American humorist (Mad Magazine, The Carol Burnett Show), Parkinson's disease.
- Akhilesh Kumar Singh, 59, Indian politician, MLA (1993–2017), cancer.
- Edson Warner, 89, Canadian Olympic sports shooter (1952, 1960).
- Kelsey Weems, 51, American basketball player (Quad City Thunder, Hartford Hellcats, Yakima SunKings).

=== 21 ===
- Dina bint Abdul-Hamid, 89, Jordanian princess, Queen consort (1955–1957).
- Ifeanyi Chiejine, 36, Nigerian Olympic footballer (2000, 2008), (CSHVSM, F.C. Indiana).
- Norma Croker, 84, Australian runner, Olympic champion (1956).
- Julian Daan, 74, Filipino comedian, actor and politician, heart failure.
- Babulal Gaur, 89, Indian politician, Chief Minister of Madhya Pradesh (2004–2005).
- Richard Gregson, 89, British agent, film producer and screenwriter.
- Richard Hoad, 88, Barbadian Olympic sailor.
- Paulo Mandlate, 85, Mozambican Roman Catholic prelate, Bishop of Tete (1976-2009).
- Jian Ming, 58, Chinese poet, writer and literary critic.
- John W. Neill, 85, British Olympic field hockey player (1960, 1964, 1968).
- Nguyễn Tiến Sâm, 73, Vietnamese jet fighter pilot.
- Celso Piña, 66, Mexican cumbia singer, composer and accordionist, heart attack.
- Lawrence Reade, 88, New Zealand cricketer (Central Districts).
- Alexander M. Schenker, 94, Polish-American professor of Slavic studies.
- Kurt Stendal, 68, Danish footballer (Hvidovre IF, SK Sturm Graz, national team).
- Ines Torelli, 88, Swiss comedian and actress (Fascht e Familie).

=== 22 ===
- William Y. Adams, 92, American anthropologist.
- Junior Agogo, 40, Ghanaian footballer (Bristol Rovers, Nottingham Forest, national team).
- Ken Batcher, 83, American academic.
- Gary Ray Bowles, 57, American serial killer, executed by lethal injection.
- Norman Frederick Charles III, 78, British professional wrestler (The Royal Kangaroos), cancer.
- Peter Chingoka, 65, Zimbabwean cricket player (South Africa African XI) and administrator.
- Bobby Dillon, 89, American football player (Green Bay Packers).
- Tim Fischer, 73, Australian politician and diplomat, Deputy Prime Minister (1996–1999), Ambassador to the Holy See (2009–2012), acute myeloid leukemia.
- Jimmy Fleming, 90, Scottish footballer (Workington). (death announced on this date)
- Gao Heng, 89, Chinese legal scholar and historian.
- Fulati Gidali, 108, Indian folk singer.
- Werner H. Kramarsky, 93, American public official and art collector.
- Vitaly Logvinovsky, 78, Russian stage actor, People's Artist (2006).
- Tom Nissalke, 87, American basketball coach (Houston Rockets, San Antonio Spurs, Utah Jazz).
- Yves Oger, 68, French Olympic rower (1972).
- Gerard O'Neill, 76, American investigative journalist and news editor (The Boston Globe), Pulitzer Prize winner (1970).
- Margarita Plavunova, 25, Russian hurdler and model, heart failure.
- Morton Tubor, 102, American film and sound editor (Cannonball, The Big Red One, Knots Landing).

=== 23 ===
- Mary Abbott, 98, American painter.
- Muzaffar Ahmed, 97, Bangladeshi politician.
- John Bluett, 89, English cricketer.
- Larissa Bonfante, 88, Italian-American classicist.
- Les Brewer, 97, American businessman.
- Clint Conatser, 98, American baseball player (Boston Braves).
- Amath Dansokho, 82, Senegalese politician.
- Mario Davidovsky, 85, Argentine-American composer (Synchronisms), Pulitzer Prize winner (1971).
- Carlo Delle Piane, 83, Italian actor (An American in Rome, A School Outing, Christmas Present), Nastro d'Argento winner (1984).
- Leo Gauriloff, 62, Finnish musician, cancer.
- Kito Junqueira, 71, Brazilian actor (Eternamente Pagú) and politician.
- David Koch, 79, American businessman (Koch Industries) and political financier (Americans for Prosperity).
- Rick Loomis, 72, American game designer, founder of Flying Buffalo, lymphatic cancer.
- Massimo Mattioli, 75, Italian cartoonist and comics writer and artist (Squeak the Mouse, Pinky).
- Peter Moscatt, Australian rugby league player (Eastern Suburbs).
- Roaring Lion, 4, British racehorse, euthanised.
- Silvia Ruegger, 58, Canadian Olympic marathon runner (1984), cancer.
- Lou Slaby, 77, American football player (New York Giants).
- Sheila Steafel, 84, South African-born British actress (Daleks' Invasion Earth 2150 A.D., Quatermass and the Pit, The Ghosts of Motley Hall), leukemia.
- Walter Thiel, 70, German theoretical chemist, President of the World Association of Theoretical and Computational Chemists (since 2011).
- Mike Thomas, 66, American football player (Washington Redskins, San Diego Chargers).
- Wang Guodong, 88, Chinese painter.
- Tim Wohlforth, 86, American political activist.
- Stuart York, 80, English cricketer.
- Egon Zimmermann, 80, Austrian ski racer, Olympic champion (1964).

=== 24 ===
- David Akiba, 78, American photographer.
- Tex Clevenger, 87, American baseball player (Boston Red Sox, Washington Senators, New York Yankees).
- Michael Eagar, 85, English cricketer (Gloucestershire).
- Blanca Fernández Ochoa, 56, Spanish alpine ski racer, Olympic bronze medallist (1992), suicide.
- Koffi Gahou, 71, Beninese artist, actor, and director.
- Tesfaye Gebreyesus, 84, Ethiopian football referee.
- Stephen S. Goss, 57, American judge, member of the Georgia Court of Appeals (2018–2019), suicide by gunshot.
- Katherine Graham, 96, American golf administrator.
- Lutz-Michael Harder, 76, German lyric tenor and academic voice teacher.
- Andrew Horn, 66, American film director, producer and screenwriter (The Nomi Song, We Are Twisted Fucking Sister!), cancer.
- Arun Jaitley, 66, Indian politician, MP (since 2000), Minister of Defence (2014, 2017) and Finance (2014–2019).
- Robert Judd, 63, American musicologist.
- Peter Kempadoo, 92, Guyanese writer, heart disease.
- Bob Kilcullen, 83, American football player (Chicago Bears).
- Ia McIlwaine, 84, British librarian.
- Thandi Ndlovu, 65, South African construction executive and philanthropist, traffic collision.
- Tony Nichols, 81, Australian Anglican prelate, Bishop of North West Australia (1992–2003).
- Sidney Rittenberg, 98, American journalist, scholar and linguist.
- Vlado Strugar, 96, Serbian historian.
- Jim Tydings, 74, Irish rugby union player.
- Lodewijk Christiaan van Wachem, 88, Dutch executive.
- Dick Woodard, 93, American football player (New York Giants).

=== 25 ===
- Sheikh Maqsood Ali, 85, Bangladeshi civil servant.
- Ed Bartram, 81, Canadian artist.
- Herbert Beattie, 93, American opera singer.
- Timothy Bell, Baron Bell, 77, British advertising and public relations executive (Bell Pottinger).
- Clora Bryant, 92, American jazz trumpeter (International Sweethearts of Rhythm), heart attack.
- Alf Burnell, 95, English rugby league footballer (Hunslet, Leeds Rhinos, national team).
- Gül Çiray, 79, Turkish Olympic middle-distance runner (1960).
- Jenaro Flores Santos, 76, Bolivian trade unionist and politician, founder of Unified Syndical Confederation of Rural Workers of Bolivia.
- Sally Floyd, 69, American computer scientist, cancer.
- Reb Foster, 83, American radio DJ (KRLA) and band manager (The Turtles, Three Dog Night, Steppenwolf).
- Jonathan Goldstein, 50, British composer, plane crash.
- Al Haynes, 87, American airline pilot, United Airlines Flight 232 crash survivor.
- B. M. Kutty, 89, Pakistani journalist and politician.
- Mona Lisa, 97, Filipino actress (Insiang, Giliw Ko, Cain at Abel).
- Eliseo Mattiacci, 78, Italian artist.
- Bernard Monnereau, 83, French Olympic rower (1960, 1964), world champion (1962).
- Vince Naimoli, 81, American businessman, founder of the Tampa Bay Rays.
- Ferdinand Piëch, 82, Austrian Hall of Fame business executive and engineer (Audi Quattro), Chairman of Volkswagen Group (1993–2015).
- Mitch Podolak, 71, Canadian folk music promoter, co-founder of the Winnipeg Folk Festival, complications from septic shock.
- Elisa Pomarelli, 28, Italian murder victim, strangulation.
- Anne Grete Preus, 62, Norwegian musician, cancer.
- Jerry Rook, 75, American basketball player (New Orleans Buccaneers, Arkansas State Red Wolves).
- Ian Sinclair, 86, New Zealand cricketer.
- Jafar Umar Thalib, 57, Indonesian Islamic militant and teacher, founder of Laskar Jihad.
- Leon Wofsy, 97, American biochemist and activist.
- Lodewijk Woltjer, 89, Dutch astronomer.
- Fernanda Young, 49, Brazilian novelist, screenwriter and actress (Os Normais), cardiac arrest.

=== 26 ===
- Patty Abramson, 74, American venture capitalist.
- Khalilur Rahman Babar, 67, Bangladeshi actor (Rangbaz), film director and producer.
- Maude Ballou, 93, American civil rights activist.
- Greg Barton, 73, American football player (Detroit Lions, Toronto Argonauts), complications from Alzheimer's disease.
- Pal Benko, 91, French-born Hungarian-American chess grandmaster.
- Christian Bonaud, 62, French Islamologist and philosopher, marine accident.
- Neal Casal, 50, American musician (Ryan Adams & the Cardinals, Blackfoot, Chris Robinson Brotherhood), suicide.
- Kanchan Chaudhary Bhattacharya, 72, Indian police officer, Director General of the Uttarakhand Police (2004–2007).
- Chen Jiayong, 97, Chinese metallurgist and chemical engineer.
- Colin Clark, 35, American soccer player (Colorado Rapids, Houston Dynamo, national team), heart attack.
- Joseph W. Coker, 88, American politician.
- Richard Conrad, 84, American opera singer and voice teacher.
- Felix Donnelly, 89, New Zealand Roman Catholic priest, academic and talkback host (Radio Pacific).
- Ray Henwood, 82, Welsh-born New Zealand actor (Gliding On).
- Tom Jordan, 99, American baseball player (Chicago White Sox, Cleveland Indians, St. Louis Browns), complications from a heart attack.
- Dr. Karonte, 62, Mexican professional wrestler (CMLL).
- Ian Kerr, 54, Canadian academic lawyer, cancer.
- Helmut Krauss, 78, German actor.
- Roy Lucas, 77, American football coach.
- Pita Paraone, 73, New Zealand politician, MP (2002–2008, 2014–2017).
- Isabel Toledo, 59, Cuban-born American fashion designer, breast cancer.
- Walmir Alberto Valle, 81, Brazilian Roman Catholic prelate, Bishop of Zé Doca (1991–2002) and Joaçaba (2003–2010), cancer.
- Gavin Watson, 71, South African prison executive, CEO of Bosasa (since 2000), traffic collision.
- Geoff Wraith, 72, English rugby league player and coach.
- Mir Tanha Yousafi, 64, Pakistani poet, novelist and writer.

=== 27 ===
- Pedro Bell, 69, American artist and illustrator (Parliament-Funkadelic).
- Nimu Bhowmik, 83, Indian actor (Arun Barun O Kiranmala, Nater Guru, Gyarakal).
- Albert Vickers Bryan Jr., 92, American judge, Chief Judge of the District Court for the Eastern District of Virginia (1985–1991), pneumonia.
- Gilmer Capps, 87, American politician.
- Yigal Cohen-Orgad, 81, Israeli politician, MP (1977–1988) and Minister of Finance (1983–1984).
- Jessi Combs, 39, American racer and television host (Xtreme 4x4, MythBusters, Overhaulin'), jet-car crash.
- Frances Crowe, 100, American peace activist.
- Wadie P. Deddeh, 98, Iraqi-born American politician, member of the California State Assembly (1967–1983) and Senate (1983–1993).
- Sven Trygve Falck, 76, Norwegian politician, MP (1981–1985).
- Donnie Fritts, 76, American keyboardist (Kris Kristofferson) and songwriter, complications from heart surgery.
- Saif Ahmad Al Ghurair, 95, Emirati businessman, Chairman of Al Ghurair Group (since 1960).
- Abel González Chávez, 76, Colombian radio and television host, stroke.
- Gary Gruber, 78, American theoretical physicist.
- Sir Dawda Jawara, 95, Gambian politician, Prime Minister (1962–1970) and President (1970–1994).
- Kopi John, 25, Papua New Guinean cricketer (national team).
- John Ssenseko Kulubya, 84, Ugandan real estate investor, complications from pneumonia.
- Rajnish Kumar, 59, Indian politician, member of the Punjab Legislative Assembly (since 2012).
- Philippe Madrelle, 82, French politician, Senator (since 1980).
- Richard Mamiya, 94, American heart surgeon.
- José Mateo, 91, Spanish racing cyclist.
- Paul Meger, 90, Canadian ice hockey player (Montreal Canadiens), Stanley Cup champion (1953).
- Stephen O. Murray, 69, American sociologist, lymphoma.
- Sōju Nosaka II, 81, Japanese musician.
- Tom O'Hara, 77, American Olympic middle-distance runner (1964).
- Park Han-yong, 68, South Korean businessman, President of POSCO (2012–2013).
- Guy Parsons, 93, British accountant.
- Paul Peterson, 98, Canadian football player (Hamilton Flying Wildcats).
- Leopoldo Pomés, 87, Spanish photographer and publicist.
- Tahu Potiki, 52, New Zealand Māori leader, chief executive of Te Rūnanga o Ngāi Tahu (2002–2006).
- Don Sallee, 86, American politician.
- Thanadsri Svasti, 92, Thai food writer and broadcaster, cholangiocarcinoma.
- Martin Weitzman, 77, American economist.
- Gustav Wiklund, 85, Finnish actor and painter.
- Zhang Zong, 90, Chinese crystallographer, member of the Chinese Academy of Sciences.

=== 28 ===
- Michel Aumont, 82, French actor (The Toy, A Sunday in the Country, Dangerous Moves).
- Clive Featherby, 86, British motorcycle speedway rider.
- Pascal Gnazzo, 98, French racing cyclist.
- Donnie Green, 71, American football player (Buffalo Bills, Philadelphia Eagles, Detroit Lions).
- Steve Hiett, 79, British photographer.
- Nancy Holloway, 86, American singer and actress.
- Giuseppe Iamonte, 70, Italian mobster ('Ndrangheta), fall.
- Gary King, 85, American businessman and radio personality.
- Nicolás Leoz, 90, Paraguayan football executive, President of CONMEBOL (1986–2013).
- June Lyne, 87, American politician.
- Max McDonald, 92, Australian politician, member of the Victorian Legislative Assembly (1979–1992).
- Nie Yuanzi, 98, Chinese academic administrator, leader of the Red Guards, respiratory failure.
- Sogyal Rinpoche, 72, Tibetan Dzogchen lama and writer (The Tibetan Book of Living and Dying), founder of Rigpa organization, pulmonary embolism.
- George P. Schiavelli, 71, American judge.
- Sean Stephenson, 40, American self-help author and motivational speaker, head injury.
- Valeriy Syrov, 72, Russian-born Ukrainian football player (Karpaty Lviv, Metalurh Zaporizhya) and manager.
- Nikola Trojanović, 90, Yugoslav Olympic swimmer.
- Paz Undurraga, 89, Chilean singer and composer.

=== 29 ===
- Don Aickin, 84, New Zealand obstetrician and gynaecologist (University of Otago, Christchurch).
- Biba Caggiano, 82, Italian-born American restaurateur and cookbook author.
- Lila Cockrell, 97, American politician, Mayor of San Antonio (1975–1981, 1989–1991).
- Terrance Dicks, 84, English screenwriter (Doctor Who, Crossroads, Space: 1999).
- Nita Engle, 93, American watercolorist.
- Richard Geist, 74, American politician, member of the Pennsylvania House of Representatives (1978–2013), heart attack.
- Jean Guillou, 88, French Olympic gymnast (1952, 1956).
- Janusz Hajnos, 51, Polish Olympic ice hockey player (1992).
- Guy Innes-Ker, 10th Duke of Roxburghe, 64, British aristocrat.
- Juhani Kärkinen, 83, Finnish Olympic ski jumper (1960), world champion (1958).
- Miklós Kocsár, 85, Hungarian composer.
- Jim Langer, 71, American Hall of Fame football player (Miami Dolphins, Minnesota Vikings), heart failure.
- Jim Leavelle, 99, American homicide detective, police escort for Lee Harvey Oswald, heart attack.
- Brad Linaweaver, 66, American science fiction writer, cancer.
- Maria Dolors Renau, 82, Spanish politician, Deputy (1982–1986, 1989–1993), MEP (1986–1987) and president of Socialist International Women (1999–2003).
- Mohammad Muslim, Indian politician, MLA (1996–2002, 2012–2017).
- Randy Romero, 61, American Hall of Fame jockey, stomach cancer.
- Achille Silvestrini, 95, Italian-born Vatican diplomat and Roman Catholic cardinal, Prefect of the Congregation for the Oriental Churches (1991–2000).
- Dick Taylor, 77, Australian rugby player.
- Vladimir Veličković, 84, Serbian painter.
- Leonard Wery, 93, Dutch Olympic field hockey player.

=== 30 ===
- Chester Aaron, 96, American writer.
- Deyan Ranko Brashich, 78, American attorney and writer.
- Gordon Bressack, 68, American television writer (Pinky and the Brain, Animaniacs, Bionic Six).
- Franco Columbu, 78, Italian bodybuilder and actor (Conan the Barbarian, The Terminator), Mr. Olympia winner (1976, 1981), heart attack.
- Jim Colvin, 81, American football player.
- Stephen Cretney, 83, British legal scholar.
- Elaine Darling, 83, Australian politician, MP (1980–1993).
- Dennis Fentie, 68, Canadian politician, Premier of Yukon (2002–2011) and MLA (1996–2011), cancer.
- Ken France, 78, New Zealand footballer.
- Lamberto Giorgis, 87, Italian football player (Taranto) and manager (Lecce, Sampdoria).
- Bernard F. Grabowski, 96, American politician, member of the House of Representatives (1963–1967).
- William D. Grampp, 105, American economist.
- A. James Gregor, 90, American historian.
- Valerie Harper, 80, American actress (The Mary Tyler Moore Show, Rhoda, Valerie), Emmy Award winner (1971, 1972, 1973, 1975), leptomeningeal carcinomatosis.
- James Cellan Jones, 88, Welsh film and television director (The Roads to Freedom, The Forsyte Saga, Fortunes of War), Chairman of BAFTA (1983–1985), stroke.
- Melisa Michaels, 73, American author.
- Park Taesun, 77, South Korean writer.
- Hans Rausing, 93, Swedish businessman, Chairman of Tetra Pak (1985–1993).
- Udo Schaefer, 92, German lawyer and Baháʼí author.
- Shevin Smith, 44, American football player (Tampa Bay Buccaneers).

=== 31 ===
- Jeff Blackshear, 50, American football player (Seattle Seahawks, Baltimore Ravens, Kansas City Chiefs), pancreatic cancer.
- Ryszard Czerniawski, 67, Polish lawyer and economist, vice-chairman of the board of Warsaw Stock Exchange (1994–2006) and vice-ombudsman (2012–2015).
- Leslie H. Gelb, 82, American journalist (The New York Times) and government official, Assistant Secretary of State (1977–1979).
- Alec Holowka, 35, Canadian video game developer (Aquaria, I'm O.K – A Murder Simulator, Night in the Woods), suicide.
- Anthoine Hubert, 22, French racing driver, GP3 Series champion (2018), race crash.
- William J. Larkin Jr., 91, American politician, member of the New York State Assembly (1979–1990) and Senate (1991–2018).
- Michael Lindsay, 56, American voice actor (Bleach, Naruto, Digimon).
- Sergio Lobato García, 64, Mexican politician, federal deputy in the LXI Legislature of Congress.
- Marita Lorenz, 80, German-born American spy, heart failure.
- Mary Ma, 66, Chinese business executive, CFO of Lenovo, pancreatic cancer.
- Jane Mathews, 78, Australian judge, Supreme Court of New South Wales (1987–1994).
- Wim Statius Muller, 89, Curaçaoan composer and pianist.
- Hal Naragon, 90, American baseball player (Cleveland Indians, Washington Senators/Minnesota Twins) and coach (Detroit Tigers).
- Jim Pettie, 65, Canadian ice hockey player (Boston Bruins), cancer.
- Hugo Pfaltz, 87, American politician.
- Earl Ravenal, 88, American foreign policy analyst, academic, and writer.
- Donald Rooum, 91, English cartoonist and activist.
- Agnar Sandmo, 81, Norwegian economist, cancer.
- Mamadou Tew, 59, Senegalese footballer (Club Brugge, Charleroi, national team).
- Marshall P. Tulin, 93, American hydrodynamics engineer.
- Immanuel Wallerstein, 88, American sociologist, developer of world-systems theory.
- Wang Buxuan, 97, Chinese thermal physicist, member of the Chinese Academy of Sciences.
- Zbigniew Zaleski, 72, Polish politician.
