= Donald Klein =

Donald Klein may refer to:

- Donald F. Klein (1928–2019), American psychiatrist
- Donald L. Klein (born 1930), American inventor
