= Wofsy =

Wofsy is a surname. Notable people with the surname include:

- Leon Wofsy (1921–2019), American biochemist, activist, and educator
- Steven Wofsy, American scientist
