= Robert Judd =

Robert Judd may refer to:

- Robert Judd (musicologist) (1956–2019), American musicologist
- Robert Judd (actor) (1926–1986), American actor
