= Paul Peterson (disambiguation) =

Paul Peterson (born 1964), also known as St. Paul Peterson, is an American singer and musician.

Paul Peterson may also refer to:

- Paul Petersen (born 1945), American actor, singer, novelist, and activist
- Paul Peterson (golfer) (born 1988), American golfer
- Paul Peterson (American football) (born 1980), quarterback for the Boston College Eagles
- Paul Peterson (Canadian football) (1921–2019), Canadian football player
- Paul Peterson (curler), American curler
- Paul E. Peterson (born 1940), scholar on education reform

== See also ==
- Paul Pedersen (disambiguation)
