= Syrov (surname) =

Syrov (Russian: Сыров) is a Russian masculine surname; its feminine counterpart is Syrova. It may refer to the following notable people:

- Igor Syrov (born 1969), Russian football player
- Valeriy Syrov (1946–2019), Soviet football player
