= Jianming =

Jianming (建明) may refer to:

- Jianming, Hebei, a town in Zunhua, Hebei, China.
- Jianming (386), an era name used by Murong Yi, ruler of Western Yan
- Jianming (530–531), an era name used by Yuan Ye, emperor of Northern Wei

== See also ==
- Jian Ming (1961–2019), Chinese poet
