= Pharmacological dissection =

Distinguishing diseases by responses to drugs

Pharmacological dissection discriminates among varieties of superficially similar disorders or syndromes by their differential response to a drug.

The term was introduced in 1957, and popularized in psychopharmacology by Donald Klein.
