= Paul Pedersen =

Paul Pedersen or Petersen may refer to:

- Paul Pedersen (composer) (born 1935), Canadian composer
- Paul Pedersen (gymnast) (1886–1948), Norwegian gymnast

== See also ==
- Paul Petersen (born 1945), American actor
- Paul Peterson (disambiguation)
