= The Best and Worst of Tred Barta =

- Genre: Hunting/Sports
- Narrated by: Tred Barta
- Country of origin: United States

Original release
- Network: Outdoor Life Network (2004-2006); Versus (2006-present)
- Release: 2004 – 2012

The Best and Worst of Tred Barta was a reality television series hosted by Tred Barta which began airing on the Outdoor Life Network on November 5, 2004.
