= Peter H. Reill =

American historian (1938–2019)

Peter Hanns Reill (1938–2019) was an American historian. A professor at the University of California, Los Angeles, he taught history and served as the director of the UCLA Clark Library and the Center for 17th- and 18th-Century Studies.

Reill was born in Astoria, NY, on December 11, 1938, the child of immigrants from Germany. He earned a bachelor's degree from New York University in 1960, and his PhD from Northwestern University in 1969. He joined the Department of History at UCLA as an assistant professor in 1966, and became full professor in 1980. He chaired the History Department at UCLA from 1988 to 1991. In his research, he specialized on the cultural and intellectual history of Europe during the Enlightenment, with a focus on the exchange of scientific and philosophical ideas between Germany, Britain, and France. Through this specialty he also criticized the originality of Ranke's Seminar as one of the historians who argued that Ranke took the idea of the seminar and made it into a popular system.

His notable works include The German Enlightenment and the Rise of Historicism (1975) and Vitalizing Nature in the Enlightenment (2005).

== Personal life ==
Reill was married to historian Jenna Gibbs and was the father of historian Dominique Kirchner Reill.
