= Koffi Gahou =

Beninese artist, actor, and director (1947–2019)

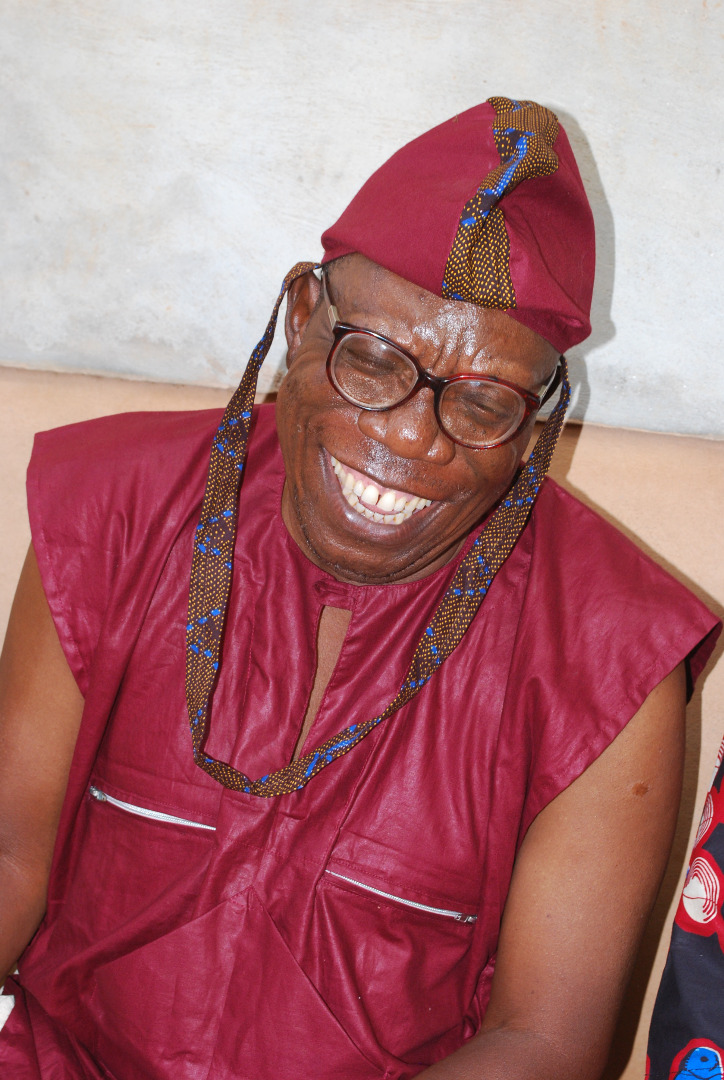
- Born: October 22, 1947; Cotonou
- Died: August 24, 2019 (aged 71); Abomey
- Occupations: Artist, actor, filmmaker, sculptor, interior decorator, painter, graphic designer

Koffi Gahou (22 October 1947 – 24 August 2019) was a Beninese artist, actor, and director.

== Biography ==
Gahou was born in Cotonou on October 22, 1947. He studied from 1986 to 1989 at the Institute of Theatrical Studies at the University of Sorbonne Nouvelle Paris 3, earning a teaching license. From 1985 to 1986 Gahou served an internship at the Conservatoire national supérieur d'art dramatique in Paris and in 1988, had an internship at the Institut international de la marionnette. Beginning in 1974, he was self-educated in the mediums of plastic art, wall tapestry, sculpture, and interior architecture. Gahou joined the civil service as an artist and performed in the "Cerveaux noirs" troupe. Also a founder of the "Zama Hara" theater group, he had several exhibitions of his work in Africa, Europe, Cuba, and the United States.

Gahou created the cloth work "Yovo Helou e, Akowe helou e" in 1990. It depicts slaves with their hands tied behind their backs, and was a great success.

In 2000, Gahou played the stepbrother of Boubacar, a farmer, in Jean Odoutan's film Barbecue Pejo.

In a video statement in April 2019, Gahou demanded to be paid the 30 million CFA Francs that a Beninese MP was ordered to give him by the 3rd Commercial Chamber of the Cotonou Court. The matter stemmed from a 2007 contest that Gahou won but did not receive the prize money.

Gahou died on 24 August 2019 in Abomey. His funeral was held on 25 September.
