= John Ssenseko Kulubya =

Ugandan businessman, engineer, and politician (1935–2019)

- Born: 1935; Uganda
- Died: 27 August 2019 (aged 83–84); Kampala
- Citizenship: Uganda
- Education: University of London (Bachelor of Science in Engineering)
- Occupations: Engineer, businessman and politician
- Years active: 1960–2019
- Known for: Wealth, rally, politics

John Ssenseko Kulubya (1935 – 27 August 2019), was an engineer, businessman, and politician in Uganda. He was reported in 2012 to be one of the wealthiest people in Uganda.

== Background and education ==
He was born in Uganda circa 1935 (1934 according to other sources). His father was the late Sserwano Ssenseko Wofunira Kulubya (CBE), who served as mayor of Kampala from 1959 until 1961, and was the first African mayor of Uganda's capital city. His mother was Uniya Namutebi. He was educated at Buddo Junior School, Kings College Buddo, Makerere College and Kampala Technical School (presently referred to as Kyambogo Technical Institute) from which he graduated as a mechanic in 1952. The young Kulubya trained as an engineer.

== Businesses and investments ==
Kulubya owned buildings and sizable tracts of land in prime areas of the capital city of Kampala and in other areas of Uganda's Central Region.

== Political career ==
He ran, unsuccessfully for the position of Mayor of Kampala, in 2006.

== Personal ==
Sssenseko Kulubya was married and was the father of four children.
