= Camillo Zanolli =

Italian cross-country skier (1929–2019)

Personal information
- Nationality: Italian
- Born: 27 October 1929; Forno di Zoldo, Italy
- Died: 17 August 2019 (aged 89); Agordo, Italy

Sport
- Sport: Cross-country skiing

Camillo Zanolli (27 October 1929 – 17 August 2019) was an Italian cross-country skier. He competed in the men's 30 kilometre event at the 1956 Winter Olympics.
