= Krishna Chandra Chunekar =

Indian ayurvedic writer (1928–2019)

- Born: 1928; Uttar Pradesh, India
- Died: 12 August 2019 (aged 90–91); Varanasi Uttar Pradesh
- Occupations: Ayurvedic practitioner and writer
- Awards: Padma Shri; National Academy of Ayurveda Fellow; Guru; Sri Gyaana Kalyaana Award

Krishna Chandra Chunekar (1928 – 12 August 2019) was an Indian ayurvedic practitioner and writer, known for the books he published, especially the translation of Vedic literature on herbal pharmacopeia. The Government of India awarded him, in 2013, the Padma Shri in medicine, the fourth highest civilian award, for his contributions.

== Biography ==
Krishna Chandra Chunekar was born in 1928 in Varanasi, the pilgrim city in the Indian state of Uttar Pradesh. He had his ayurveda training from known ayurveda scholars such as Sriniwas Shastri and Professor Satyanarayana Shastri of the Banares Hindu University and graduated in Ayurvedic medicine (AMS). His career was mainly at the Ayurveda College at the Institute of Medical Sciences, Banaras Hindu University from where retired as a professor and the Head of the Department of Dravya Guna in 1988. He also worked as a visiting professor at the Gujarat Ayurveda University in Jamnagar.

Chunekar, a doctorate holder in ayurveda, was considered by many as an authority on Dravya Guna and in the identification of ayurvedic herbs. His experience helped many research scholars in their researches and doctoral studies while his service was hired by the World Health Organization for their activities in Nepal. He has served on the scientific advisory committee of the Indian Council of Medical Research and was a senior expert advisor for the Traditional Knowledge Digital Library Project of the Council for Scientific and Industrial Research.

Chunekar, a member of the Ayurveda, Siddha and Unani Drugs Technical Advisory Board of the Government of India, was awarded the fellowship by the National Academy of Ayurveda. He was also awarded the title of Guru by the Government of India and was a recipient of the Sri Gyaana Kalyaana Award which he received in 2000. In 2013, he was honoured by the Government of India by awarding him the Padma Shri.

Chunekar was the author of five books on ayurveda, the most notable among them being the Medicinal Plants of Susruta Samhita.

He died on 12 August 2019.

== Works ==
- KC Chunekar; NO Hota (1999). Plants of Bhava Prakash. National Academy of Ayurveda. OCLC 57532633.
- K C Chunekar; C L Yadava (2005). Medicinal plants of Suśruta Saṁhitā. European Institute of Vedic Studies.
