= Soma Bhupala =

Indian politician (died 2019)

MLA of Atmakur
- In office 1962–1967

MLA of Amarchinta
- In office 1967–1977

Personal details
- Born: 1926/27
- Died: 18 August 2019
- Party: Indian National Congress

Soma Bhupala was an Indian politician belonging to Indian National Congress. He was elected as a member of Andhra Pradesh Legislative Assembly three times, in 1962, 1967 and 1972. He died on 18 August 2019 at the age of 92.
