= Alla Ter-Sarkisiants =

Alla Yervandovna "Yervandi"
- Born: April 25, 1937
- Died: August 16, 2019 (aged 82)
- Education: Moscow State University
- Occupations: historian and ethnographer of Armenia
- Known for: doctor of historical science
- Awards: Certificates of merit from the Presidiums of USSR Academy of Sciences and Russian Academy of Sciences

Alla Yervandovna "Yervandi" Ter-Sarkisiants (Ալլա Երվանդի Տեր-Սարգսյանց; Russian: Алла Ервандовна Тер-Саркисянц) (April 25, 1937 – August 16, 2019) was a historian and ethnographer of Armenia, doctor of historical sciences, leading specialist of the Caucasus department of N. N. Miklukho-Maklai Institute of Ethnology and Anthropology of the Russian Academy of Sciences, and a corresponding member of the Russian Academy of Natural Sciences.

She finished her degree in history at Moscow State University in 1959. In 1968 she received her PhD from the N. N. Miklukho-Maklai Institute of Ethnology and Anthropology, and in 1998 she received Doctor of Historical Sciences title for her "The Armenians. History and ethno-cultural traditions" research. In 1978–1989 she was the secretary for science affairs of the N. N. Miklukho-Maklai Institute of Ethnology and Anthropology. Deputy chairman of Russian Humanitary Science Fund expert's council on history, archeology and ethnography.

== Honors and awards ==
- Certificates of merit from the Presidiums of USSR Academy of Sciences and Russian Academy of Sciences

== Publications ==
She is an author of more than 150 academic publications, including:

- The modern family in Armenia. Moscow, Nauka, 1972. 208 p.
- Ethnocultural characteristics of Armenians of the North Caucasus // Studia Pontocaucasica. 2. Krasnodar, 1995. p. 5–31.
- The Armenians. History and ethno-cultural processes. Moscow, Vostochnaya literatura RAN, 1998. 397 p.
- The history and culture of Armenian People from the ancient times to the 19th century. Moscow, Vostochnaya literatura RAN, 2005. 686 p.
