= Inge Israel =

Canadian poet and playwright (1927–2019)

Inge Israel (July 16, 1927 - August 5, 2019) was a Canadian poet and playwright who wrote in French and English.

== Early life ==
Inge Israel (née Margulies) was born in Frankfurt, Germany in 1927. The rise of the Nazism in Germany led to her parents escaping with her to France. She has also lived in Ireland and Denmark.

She met her husband, physicist Werner Israel in Dublin, Ireland, and in 1958 they moved to Edmonton, Alberta in Canada. They later moved to Victoria, British Columbia in 1996.

== Awards ==
The recipient of several poetry prizes, Inge Israel was named Chevalier de l'Ordre des Arts et des Lettres in 1998.

Her play, Pensées Inédites was broadcast on Radio Canada and several stories and poetry cycles were broadcast on the CBC and the BBC. In addition to readings of her poetry in Canada, Europe and Japan, Inge Israel has given dramatized presentations of her plays in Canada and Japan.

== Works ==
=== Books ===
- Réflexions, poetry (French), Ed. St.Germain-des-Prés, Paris, 1978. ISBN 2-243-00827-0
- Même le Soleil a des Taches, poetry, Ed. St.Germain-des-Prés, 1980. ISBN 2-243-01134-4
- Aux Quatre Terres, poetry (French), Ed. du Vermillon, Ottawa, 1990. ISBN 0-919925-52-9
- Raking Zen Furrows, poetry, Ronsdale Press, Vancouver, 1991. ISBN 0-921870-05-1
- Unmarked Doors, poetry, Ronsdale Press, Vancouver, 1992. ISBN 0-921870-16-7
- Le Tableau Rouge, short stories (French), Ed. du Vermillon, 1997. ISBN 1-895873-48-7
- Rifts in the Visible/Fêlures dans le Visible poetry (bilingual), Ronsdale Press, 1997. ISBN 0-921870-45-0
- Ucho no Samon, Japanese translation of Raking Zen Furrows, Bungeisha Press, Japan, 2007. ISBN 978-4-286-03632-8
- Beckett Soundings, poetry, Ronsdale Press, to be published in March 2011. ISBN 978-1553801122
- Finding the Words, autobiography, Niagara: Seraphim Editions 2016. ISBN 978-1927079409

=== Plays ===
- Clean Breast, drama in 2 acts, Questex, 1999. ISBN 1-896913-23-7
- The Unwritten Letters/Wild Rhythm, 2 dramas, Questex, 1999. ISBN 1-896913-24-5
- Philosophy & Other Catastrophes, play, Questex, 2005. ISBN 1-896913-45-8

=== Essays, plays, and poetry published in anthologies ===
- L'ouest en Nouvelles, Editions des Plaines, 1986. ISBN 978-0-920944-64-6
- Sous le Soleil de L'ouest, Ed. des Plaines, 1988. ISBN 0-920944-71-X
- Iwanami Shoten, Tokyo, Japan, 1993.
- Eating Apples, NeWest Press, Edmonton, AB, 1994. ISBN 978-0-920897-79-9
- Littérature et culture francophones de Colombie-Britannique, Les Editions David, 2004. ISBN 978-2-89597-025-5
- Sweet Lemons 2, Legas of Mineola, New York & Ottawa, 2010. ISBN 1-881901-76-9
