= Yu Zhengui =

Chinese historian (1946–2019)

- Traditional Chinese: 余振貴
- Simplified Chinese: 余振贵
Transcriptions
Standard Mandarin
- Hanyu Pinyin: Yú Zhènguì
- IPA: [y̌ ʈʂə̂ŋ.kwêɪ]

Yu Zhengui

Muhammad Ali Yu Zhengui (Chinese: 余振贵; February 1946 – 18 August 2019) was a Chinese historian and scholar of Islam. He served as Executive Vice President of the Islamic Association of China and President of the Ningxia Academy of Social Sciences. He was a member of the Standing Committee of the 11th National People's Congress.

== Life and career ==
Yu Zhengui was born in February 1946 in Nanjing, Jiangsu, Republic of China. He was a member of the Muslim Hui ethnic group. His Arabic name was Muhammad Ali (穆罕默德·阿里).

From 1964 to 1970, Yu studied history at Fudan University in Shanghai. In August 1970, during the Cultural Revolution, he was sent to perform penal labour at a laogai camp in Pingluo County, Ningxia Hui Autonomous Region, and later became a teacher. From 1974 to 1980, he worked at Northwest Coal Mining Machinery Factory in Dawukou, Shizuishan.

In December 1980, Yu was transferred to the Ningxia Academy of Social Sciences, where he worked for the next 19 years. He began as a researcher in the Institute of Nationalities and Religions, and later served as President of the academy in the 1990s.

In January 2000, Yu was appointed Vice President of the Islamic Association of China, and later promoted to Executive Vice President. From September 2011 until his death, he was an advisor to the association. He also served as Vice President of the China Religion Society. Yu was a member of the 10th Chinese People's Political Consultative Conference and a member of the Standing Committee of the 11th National People's Congress.

Yu died on 18 August 2019 at the age of 73. His funeral was held at the China Islamic Institute on 20 August.

== Contributions ==
Yu was renowned for his research on the history of Islam in China and on ethnic and religious issues. He published over 40 research papers and more than ten monographs, including Annotated Summary of Chinese Islamic Documents (中国伊斯兰文献著译提要, 1993, co-authored with Yang Huaizhong 杨怀中), Islam and Chinese Culture (伊斯兰与中国文化, 1995, with Yang Huaizhong), China's Political Power Across History and Islam (中国历代政权与伊斯兰教, 1996), and The Development of Northwest China and Its Opening to the West (中国西北地区开发与向西开放); the last was awarded the Sixth National Book Prize of China.
