= Nita Engle =

American watercolorist (1925–2019)

- Born: September 30, 1925; Michigan
- Died: August 29, 2019 (aged 93); Ishpeming, Michigan
- Education: School of the Art Institute of Chicago
- Known for: Painting

Nita Engle (September 30, 1925 – August 29, 2019) was an American watercolorist. She worked as an art director and magazine illustrator and exhibited in and out of the United States. Engle received several awards, including an honorary doctorate from Northern Michigan University. A documentary was made about her entitled Wilderness Palette - Nita Engle in Michigan and she wrote the book How to Make a Watercolor Paint Itself: Experimental Techniques for Achieving Realistic Effects.

== Biography ==
Nita Joy Engle was born in Michigan in 1925. Her parents were Charles, born in Michigan, and Sally Engle, who immigrated to the United States from Sweden in 1899. Charles was a state police officer and sergeant. Her younger brother is James. Engle attended high school in Marquette, Michigan. She then studied at Northern Michigan University. Engle attended the School of the Art Institute of Chicago for four years, during which time she studied at Roosevelt University.

She was employed at a Chicago advertising agency as an art director. Then, she obtained full-time positions working for New York and Chicago publications, ranging from "Reader's Digest to Playboy." In the 1940s the art world was a male-dominated field, so early on in her career she signed her work "N. Engle" so that she did not disclose her gender.

A member and frequent exhibitor of the American Watercolor Society since 1969, her works were exhibited at exhibitions in New York City, including "1976 - 200 Years of American Illustration" (along with works from Norman Rockwell, N.C. Wyeth and Winslow Homer and other members of the Society of Illustrators). She participated in annual Great Women Artists of America Show and in "International Waters", a show of works of artists from the United States and Great Britain; she was one of 20 American artists to participate. Engle was selected to exhibit in Taipei.

Mill Pond Press began making prints of her work in 1981. Engle returned to Marquette, Michigan and set up a studio overlooking Lake Superior. She gave workshops in the United States, Asia, Africa and Tahiti, which were inspiration from some of her wilderness and nature paintings. She had a unique way of making her paintings by "throwing, squirting, pouring and spraying" paint onto the paper.

Wilderness Palette - Nita Engle in Michigan, a PBS documentary film of her work, was made in 1985 in Anchorage, Alaska by KAKM. She has said, "There is so little wilderness left; we are surrounded by pavement. My goal is to take you into the landscape through my painting."

One of her works, Grouse Country, is owned by the Art of the Embassies Program, United States Department of State. It was a donation by Robert Lewin. A retrospective of her work was held at the DeVos Art Museum in Marquette in 2010.

== Awards and honors ==
- "Artist of the Year", American Artist magazine (1984)
- Honorary Doctorate, Northern Michigan University (1986)
- Named Art Master, Art Masters Awards Program, American Artist magazine (1996)
- U.S. ART's Hall of Fame (1997)
- E. Scott Michigan Artist Prize for lifelong excellence and achievement

== Publications ==
- Nita Engle. How to Make a Watercolor Paint Itself: Experimental Techniques for Achieving Realistic Effects. Watson-Guptill Publications; 2007. ISBN 978-0-8230-9977-1.
