= Jean-Paul Capelle =

French field hockey player (1945–2019)

Personal information
- Nationality: French
- Born: 10 February 1945 Saint-Ouen, France
- Died: 12 August 2019 (aged 74)

Sport
- Sport: Field hockey

Jean-Paul Capelle (10 February 1945 – 12 August 2019) was a French field hockey player. He competed in the men's tournament at the 1968 Summer Olympics.
