= Paz Undurraga =

Chilean singer (1930–2019)

Paz Undurraga (June 14, 1930, Santiago – August 28, 2019, Santiago) was a Chilean singer. She began her career as a member of Las Cuatro Brujas, and later became a solo artist. She won the Best Performer Award at the 1989 Viña del Mar International Song Festival. She was married to Luis Urquidi.
