= Deyan Ranko Brashich =

New York City attorney, author and columnist (1940–2019)

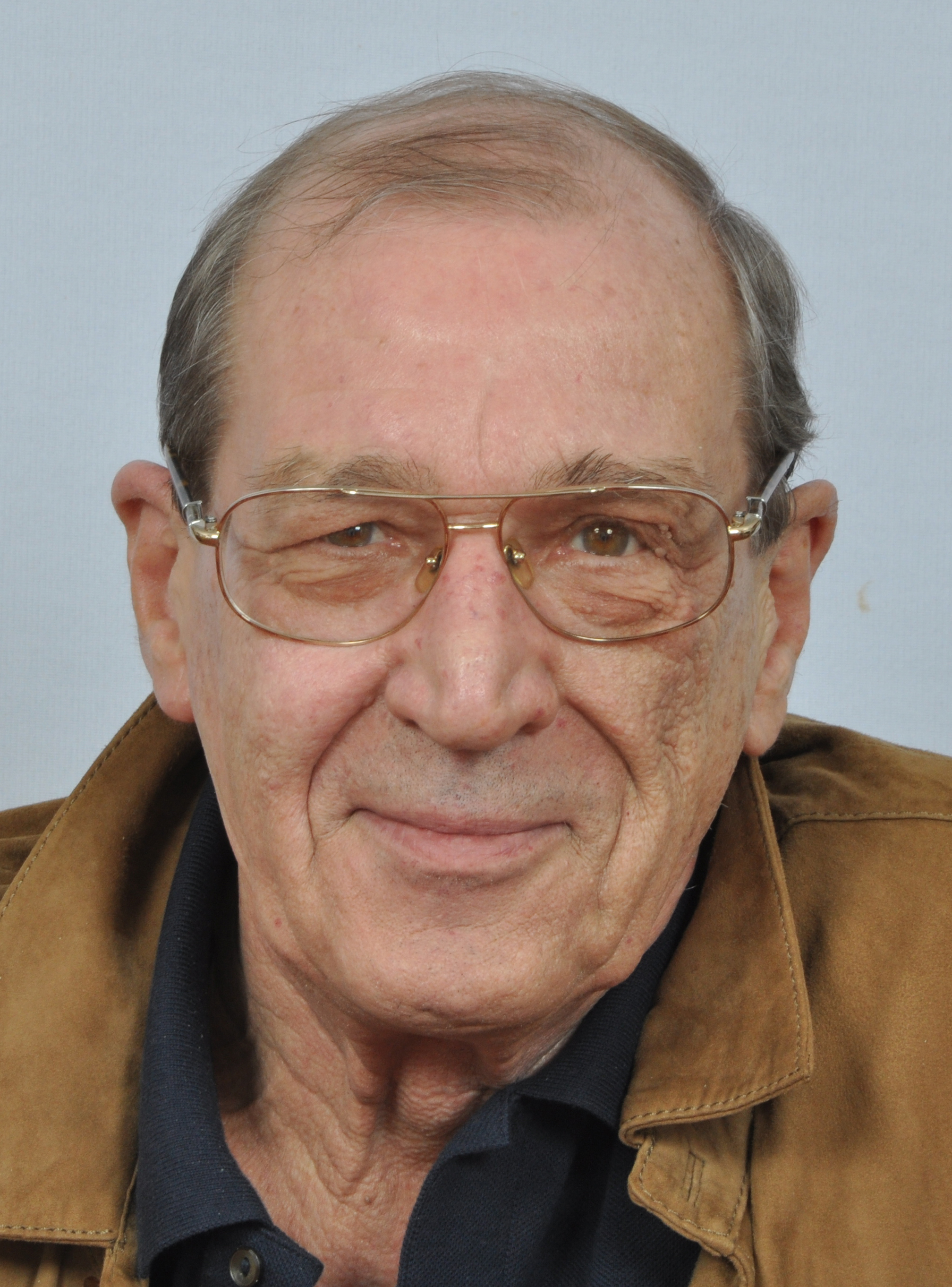
- Brashich in 2013
- Born: 16 September 1940; Belgrade, Yugoslavia
- Died: 30 August 2019 (aged 78); New York City
- Occupations: Attorney, author, columnist
- Website: http://deyanbrashich.com/

Deyan Ranko Brashich (Serbian: Dejan Ranko Brašić; Serbian Cyrillic: Дејан Ранко Брашић, 16 September 1940 – 30 August 2019) was a Serbian-American attorney, author, and columnist.

== Life and career ==
Brashich, born in Belgrade in 1940, fled communist Yugoslavia in 1946. His father was a Serbian royalist and anti-communist figure. He was a graduate of Connecticut's Trinity College, the New York University School of Law and The Hague Academy of International Law. He attended the University of Grenoble and University of Hartford's School of Art at the Wadsworth Athenaeum.

He was admitted to the New York Bar in 1966, and worked in a private practice in New York City with the law firm Brashich & Finley. He was a litigator. He worked on both civil and criminal cases, as well as domestic and international.

He dealt with a number of significant cases: recovering purloined art—Constantin Brâncuși’s The Muse; representing the politically jailed Graiver family in Argentina; working in cases before the Supreme Court for the United States and circuit Courts of Appeal such as Schwartz v Postel, Regents v Bakke, Steelworkers v Weber, and Brashich v Port Authority of New York and New Jersey on constitutional challenges.

He was the lead defense counsel at the International Criminal Tribunal for the Former Yugoslavia (ICTY) in the Hague for Momčilo Krajišnik and Stevan Todorovic, both accused of war crimes. In a historic case that attracted much notoriety, Deyan also represented Nikola Kavaja, the hijacker of American Airlines Flight 293. In June 1979, Deyan boarded the hijacked plane at Chicago's O’Hare International Airport and negotiated the release of 135 passengers, substituted himself as hostage, and surrendered his client at Shannon, Ireland.

Brashich was also an adjunct professor of law at Pace University, White Plains, New York, from 1983 to 1989. Brashich was a founding member of the Serbian-American Bar Association and was decorated with the Orders of Star of Karadjordje and St. Sava (Royal, Yugoslav), as well as the Selective Service Medal (Civil, US).

He died on 30 August 2019. He is survived by his wife, Patricia and their daughter, Arianna. With his first wife, Catherine Sidor, he had two daughters Alexis and Audrey. He is also survived by his older brother, Neboysha R. Brashich.

== Publisher, op-ed columnist and author ==
Brashich authored commentaries on domestic as well as international legal topics, including in The New York Law Journal; Op-Ed essays on political, legal, and social issues of the day for his blog Contrary Views; and magazine articles covering literature and art. He was editor and publisher of The Foothills News (CT); Editor-at-Large for The Country and Abroad; and Contributing-Editor for the publications Passport (US), Scrisul Romanesc (Romania), Pecat (Serbia), Britic (UK) and Ekurd Daily (Kurdish).

He was an op-ed columnist for several US newspapers. His column won 2nd place Award 2011 for Best Opinion Column. He is editor-at-large for The Country and Abroad, an art and museum magazine and writes the Letter from America column for Scrisul Romanesc, a literary magazine published in Romania. He was a frequent contributor to Pecat, Britic and EKurd Daily.

He also self-published three books—Letters from America: Essays with a New York State of Mind (2013), Contrary Views: Columns from the Litchfield County Times (2003–2014), and Dispatches (2017). With David E. Blabey, he also wrote Schwartz v Postel, The Making of Modern Law (2011).
