= Marshall P. Tulin =

American engineer (1926–2019)

Marshall P. Tulin (14 March 1926 – 31 August 2019) was an American engineer working in hydrodynamics. He was the Director of the Ocean Engineering Laboratory, University of California, Santa Barbara, where he also held a University of California President Chair Professorship from 1982 to 1987. His pioneering work in the 1950s is credited with successful developments in the theory of supercavitation for naval engineering.

After graduating from MIT in 1946, he first worked on high-speed wind tunnel testing of the X-1 aircraft before moving to work for the Navy at the David Taylor Model Basin. He founded a consulting company, Hydronautics Inc, with Phillip Eisenberg in 1959.

He was elected to membership of the National Academy of Engineering in 1979.

== Selected writing ==
- Tulin, M. P. (1963). Supercavitating flows - small perturbation theory. Laurel, Md, Hydronautics Inc.
- Tulin, M. P., & Hsu, C. C. (1982). Theory of high speed displacement ships with transom sterns. Laurel, Md, Hydronautics Inc.
