= Ia McIlwaine =

British librarian and professor (1935–2019)

- Born: Ia Cecilia Thorold; 20 April 1935
- Died: 24 August 2019 (aged 84)

Academic work
- Discipline: Librarianism; Information specialist Classics
- Institutions: Westminster City Libraries; University College London

Ia Cecilia McIlwaine FSA (20 April 1935 – 24 August 2019) (née Thorold) was a British librarian and Emeritus Professor of Library and Information Studies at University College London.

== Early life and education ==
McIlwaine was the only daughter and eldest of three children of Rev. Michael Herbert Thorold (1904–1956), MA, vicar of St John the Baptist, Bathwick, Somerset, and Dorothy, daughter of George Patrick Henfrey, of Chesham Place, Brighton, East Sussex. Her father descended from the book collector and politician Sir John Thorold, 9th Baronet through his second son, and was from a line of several generations of clergymen. Her name, "Ia", was of Cornish origin, deriving from Saint Ia of Cornwall, and etymologically linked to the place name St Ives, Cornwall.

McIlwaine was a pupil at Bath High School before reading Classics at Bedford College, London. In 1958 she gained a Graduate Diploma in Librarianship from University College London.

== Career ==
McIlwaine subsequently worked as an Assistant Librarian with Westminster City Libraries before returning to UCL as a lecturer in the School of Library and Archive Studies. She was promoted to Senior Lecturer at UCL in 1985 and then to Reader in Classification and Indexing in 1995 before, in 1997, attaining a Chair of Library & Information Studies.

In 1988, McIlwaine published her PhD these as a two-volume book titled Herculaneum: A Guide to Printed Sources, which ran to over 1,000 pages of content.

In 1998, she was a recipient of the Library Association Centenary Medal.

She was Editor-in-Chief of the Universal Decimal Classification, on which she published four titles in 1998, and Chair of the IFLA Committee of Classification and Indexing and FID/Classification and Knowledge Organization and Research Committee. She was also a Fellow of the Chartered Institute of Library and Information Professionals.

== Personal life ==
In 1966, she married fellow UCL lecturer John Hamish St John McIlwaine, who survived her. Their daughter, (Katherine) Anne (b. 1969), also works in the library field.

== Select publications ==
- 1988. McIlwaine, I. C. Herculaneum: A Guide to Printed Sources. Bibliópolis.
- 1997. McIlwaine, I. C. "The Universal Decimal Classification: Some factors concerning its origins, development, and influence", Journal of the American Society for Information Science 48, 331–339.
- 2007. McIlwaine, I. C. Universal Decimal Classification: a guide to its use. Revised ed. The Hague: UDC Consortium.
- 2009. McIlwaine, I. C. "Universal Decimal Classification (UDC)", in Encyclopedia of Library and Information Sciences (3rd Edition), pp5432–5439.
