= Kent J. Carroll =

United States Navy vice admiral (1926–2019)

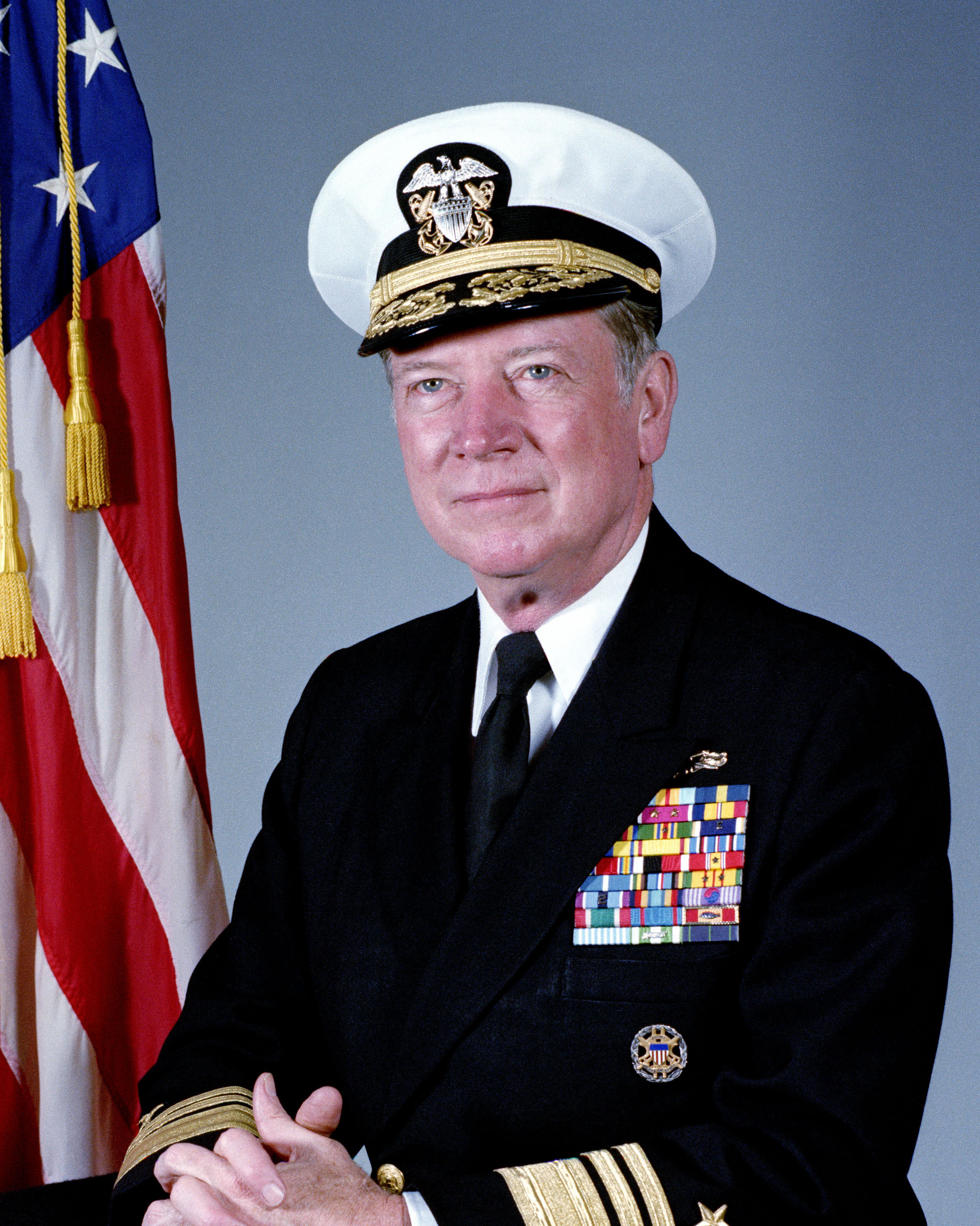
- Born: August 22, 1926; Newton, Iowa, U.S.
- Died: August 11, 2019 (aged 92); Pinehurst, North Carolina, U.S.
- Military career
- Allegiance: United States
- Branch: United States Navy
- Service years: 1944–1983
- Rank: Vice admiral
- Commands: Military Sealift Command; USS Blue Ridge

Kent Jean Carroll (August 22, 1926 – August 11, 2019) was a vice admiral in the United States Navy. He commanded the Military Sealift Command until his retirement around 1983. His awards include the Navy Distinguished Service Medal, Legion of Merit, and Defense Distinguished Service Medal. He is an alumnus of the University of Notre Dame.

He served as the first Commanding Officer of USS Blue Ridge Carroll died August 11, 2019.
