= Jackie Jocko =

American singer songwriter (1929 –2019)

Jackie Jocko (born Jackie Giaccio; 21 January 1929 – 8 August 2019) was a musician, singer, and songwriter from Buffalo, New York. His albums included: “Lover, Come Back to Me” (1952), “Jackie Jocko – Mr. Excitement – From Coast to Coast” (1961), and “Like Wow!” (1962). Following an active national music career, he returned to Buffalo in 1972, and was locally most well known for the 20 years he played at E.B. Green's Steakhouse. He was inducted into the Buffalo Music Hall of Fame in 1997.

== Early life and career ==
Born in the Buffalo, New York North Fillmore neighborhood, he began playing piano by ear at two years old. He took classical piano lessons at age nine and was playing in taverns on Hertel Avenue by the age of 12. In his teens he played piano with a 10-piece orchestra at Buffalo venues, such as the Kleinhans Music Hall and the Statler Hotel.

He met his partner and drummer, Joe Peters, in 1948. They would play together for the next 70 years until Joe's death in March 2016. Jocko described Peters as, “his partner in life and music.” Jocko and Peters played their first show together at Carl's Lounge on Jefferson Avenue near Genesee Street. Jocko left Buffalo at the age of 18 with Peters. He received his first record contract from Bill Randall of WERE Station in Cleveland, and a major record deal in 1952 from Mercury Records to produce “Lover, Come Back to Me.” He also spent some time in 1952 as the headliner for New York's famous Birdland night club. In 1962, he signed with Strand Records to produce “Jackie Jocko – Mr. Excitement – From Coast to Coast” in 1961 and “Like Wow!” in 1962.

Jocko and Peters developed a show together following the records and played for five years at the Sahara in Las Vegas, two years at Harrah's in Reno, and two years touring Hawaii.

== Later career ==
Jocko and Peters returned home to Buffalo, New York in 1972 and played at the Cloister on Delaware Avenue, the Everglades on Hertel Avenue, and St. George's Table in the Westbrook Hotel. Jocko invested in a restaurant named Jocko's Supper Club on Broadway, but later shifted to Fanny's, a former club on Sheridan Drive in Amherst, New York. His last location was E.B. Green's where he would play for the next 20 years until 2016.

Jackie Jocko died on August 8, 2019. His personal papers and archives are held by the SUNY Buffalo State College, Archives & Special Collections and are open to the community and researchers.
