= Park Han-yong =

South Korean businessman (1951–2019)

Park Han-Yong
- Born: April 13, 1951
- Died: August 27, 2019 (aged 68)
- Occupation: President of POSCO
- Known for: President of POSCO

- Korean name
- Hangul: 박한용
- RR: Bak Hanyong
- MR: Pak Hanyong

Park Han-yong (April 13, 1951 – August 27, 2019) was a South Korean businessman who served as President of POSCO.

== Biography ==
Park graduated from Dong-Rae High School and Korea University. He had started off his career at Posco (formerly Pohang Iron and Steel Company) in 1978 and served his entire career in the same company.

== Education ==
- 1969 Dong-Rae High School
- 1974 Korea University, Statistics bachelor's degree

== Career ==
- 1978.05~ Joined Pohang Iron & Steel Co.
- 1997–2003 Head of Public Relations department and Hot-roll Purchasing in POSCO
- 2003–2004 Director of Hot-roll, Thick Plate and Wire-rod Purchasing in POSCO
- 2004–2007 Director of Audit, Material Purchases and Outsourcing in POSCO
- 2007–2009 Executive Director of Human Resources in Management Services in POSCO
- 2009~ President of POSDATA* 한국공학한림원 정회원 (2008~현재)
- 2010~ Director and vice-president of Management Services of POSCO
- 2012–2013 President of POSCO
- 2019~ He died on August 27, 2019.

== Major roles ==
- Head of Public Relations department and Hot-roll Purchasing in POSCO, The Korea Economic Daily – August 9, 2000.
- Director of Hot-roll, Thick Plate and Wire-rod Purchasing in POSCO, The Korea Economic Daily – February 22, 2002.
- Director of Audit, Material Purchases and Outsourcing in POSCO, mbn – May 31, 2006.
- Executive Director of Human Resources in Management Services in POSCO, EBN Steel News – December 14, 2007.
- President of POSCO ICT, The Kyongbuk Ilbo – January 12, 2010.
- Director and vice-president of Management Services of POSCO, NEWSIS – March 10, 2012.
- President of POSCO, EBN – March 16, 2012.
