= Rodney Falkson =

South African cricketer (1941–2019)

Personal information
- Full name: Rodney Jack Falkson
- Born: 8 November 1941; Pretoria, Transvaal, South Africa
- Died: 9 August 2019 (aged 77); Pretoria, Gauteng, South Africa
- Batting: Right-handed
- Bowling: Right-arm medium
- Role: All-rounder
- Source: Cricinfo, 17 January 2020

Rodney Jack Falkson (8 November 1941 – 9 August 2019) was a South African cricketer. He played in thirty-three first-class and seven List A matches between 1960 and 1974.

Falkson captained the South African Maccabi cricket team that toured Israel in September 1971.
