= Minoru Kamata (baseball) =

Japanese baseball player (1939–2019)

- Second baseman
- Born: 8 March 1939; Mihara District, Hyōgo
- Died: 1 August 2019 (aged 80); Ashiya, Hyōgo
- Batted: Right Threw: Right

NPB debut
- 12 June, 1957, for the Hanshin Tigers

Last appearance
- 1972, for the Hanshin Tigers

NPB statistics
- Batting average: .234
- Runs batted in: 264
- Home runs: 24
- Stats at Baseball Reference

Teams
- Osaka Tigers (1957–1966); Kintetsu Buffaloes (1967–1969); Hanshin Tigers (1970–1972)

Minoru Kamata (鎌田実, Kamata Minoru; 8 March 1939 – 1 August 2019) was a Japanese professional baseball second baseman. He played in Nippon Professional Baseball (NPB) for the Osaka/Hanshin Tigers (1957–1966; 1970–1972) and Kintetsu Buffaloes (1967–1969).

Kamata was known for defense, and was particularly adept at jump throws and backhand tosses, the latter of which was rare in Nippon Professional Baseball. In retirement, Kamata became a youth baseball coach, benefactor, and baseball commentator. Kamata was diagnosed with lung cancer in May 2019, hospitalized for treatment in July, and died of the disease in an Ashiya, Hyōgo hospital on 1 August 2019.
