= Zbigniew Makowski =

Polish painter (1930–2019)

Zbigniew Makowski (31 January 1930 – 19 August 2019) was a Polish painter.

Zbigniew Makowski was born in Warsaw, Poland in 1930. Between 1950 and 1956 Makowski attended the Academy of Fine Arts in Warsaw, which included time as an apprentice in the studio of K. Tomorowicz.

Makowski spoke several languages and had an eclectic array of interests. He was fascinated by surrealism.

Makowski's artworks are archived in multiple collections, including the National Museum in Wrocław. Four of Makowski's works are in the permanent collection in New York's Museum of Modern Art (MoMA).

Makowski died at the age of 89 in the month of August in 2019.
