= Tred Barta =

American hunter, fisherman, and outdoorsman (1952–2019)

Thomas Tred Barta (March 28, 1952 – August 11, 2019) was an American hunter, fisherman, and outdoorsman who hosted The Best and Worst of Tred Barta on the TV channel Versus. As a fisherman, Barta had amassed several world records, some still current.

== Life ==
Barta grew up in Bronxville, New York and attended the Hinkley School in Maine. He attended University of Colorado Boulder and was on the ski team. He experienced spinal stroke and cancer in 2009, leaving him paralyzed from the armpits down. However, Barta continued to hunt and fish as he did before the accident.

== Hunting ==
When hunting, Barta relied predominantly on a longbow and homemade cedar arrows instead of more modern tools. From his website: "Barta eschews modern contrivances and overly sentimental views of nature and favors a "common man" approach grounded in respect for animals he hunts and the view that the pursuit can be as meaningful as killing the animal. In keeping with this, he does not consider a hunt a failure simply because no game is taken."
