= Sydney Jary =

British Army officer (1924–2019)

Sydney Jary MC (24 May 1924 – 5 August 2019) was a British Army officer who was a platoon commander during World War II. He was awarded a Military Cross for valor in combat. After the war he wrote a book, 18 Platoon, about his experiences that became a recommended text on several military academy reading lists including that of the Royal Military Academy Sandhurst.

== Early life ==
Jary was born in Ilford, Essex, on 24 May 1924 and was educated at Chigwell School.

== Military career ==
In 1942, Jary joined the Royal East Kent Regiment and, following selection for officer training, was commissioned into the Royal Artillery. Wishing to serve in the infantry, he successfully requested a transfer to the Hampshire Regiment and joined them in France shortly after the invasion of Normandy. He was, however, then posted to the 4th Battalion Somerset Light Infantry, 129th Infantry Brigade, 43rd (Wessex) Infantry Division, where he took over command of 18 Platoon, D Company. The battalion had suffered heavy losses, and Jary was informed that his life expectancy was just three weeks.

On 2 November 1944, Jary led a fighting patrol that penetrated enemy territory and identified the location of enemy machine gun positions before destroying an enemy post and two enemy-occupied buildings. As a result of his "skill and good leadership" in the operation, Jary was recommended for and received the Military Cross.

Jary participated in Operation Market Garden and the crossing of the Rhine. Following the war, he remained in the army and was posted to Libya and Palestine before eventually resigning.

== Later life ==
After leaving the army, Jary started a publishing company and, in 1987, wrote 18 Platoon, a book about his experiences during World War II. The book was widely praised as an insight into the experiences of platoon command during the war, and became a popular textbook on leadership.

== Sources ==
- Delaforce, Patrick (2014). Marching to the sound of gunfire : north-west Europe 1944–1945. Pen and Sword. ISBN 978-1473834828.
