= Abel González Chávez =

Colombian broadcaster (1943–2019)

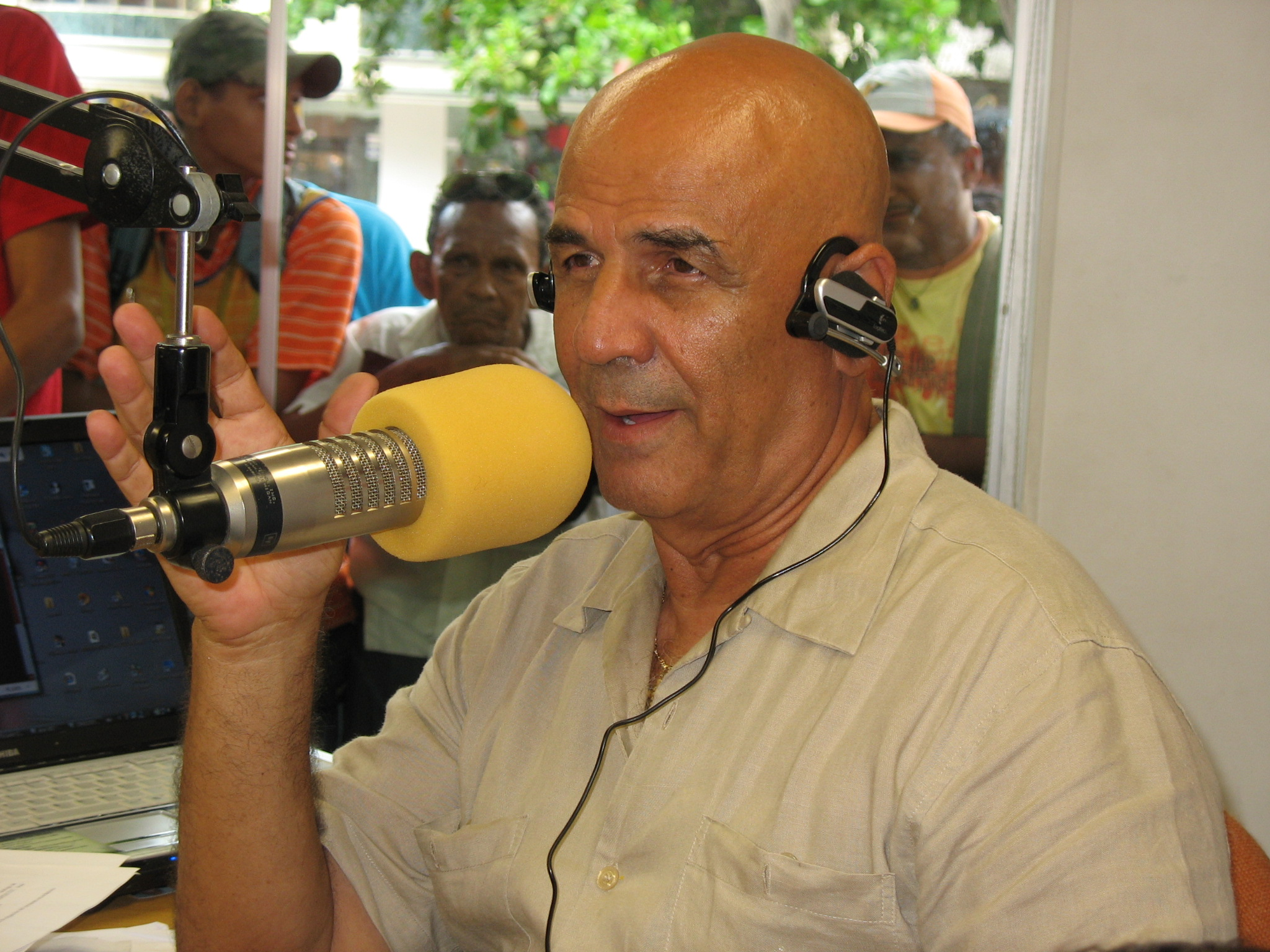
- Abel González during his Satélite radio show at Barranquilla's Emisora Atlántico
- Born: Abel Antonio González Chávez; July 26, 1943; Barranquilla, Colombia
- Died: August 27, 2019 (aged 76); Barranquilla, Colombia
- Occupations: Anchor of Satélite, radio personality
- Years active: 1964–2019
- Spouse: Ingrid Oliva Gonzalez
- Children: Claudia, Karina, Sara, Anabella, Catalina, Abel
- Awards: India Catalina Award, Postobón National Award

Abel González Chávez (July 26, 1943 – August 27, 2019) was a Colombian radio/television host. From 1996 to 2019, González hosted a daily radio program on Emisora Atlántico called Satélite.

== Early life ==
González was born Abel Antonio González Chávez in Barranquilla, Colombia. He studied at Colón High School (1960). As a young man he began to work in the Barranquilla media. His father was fond of radio and an amateur singer. The radio atmosphere in Barranquilla during the 1950s marked him for good. Encouraged by Marcos Pérez Caicedo he initially tried to become a broadcaster. In 1964 he passed an exam in Bogotá and finally received his radio license. His main influences were Marcos Pérez Caicedo, Gustavo Castillo and Juan Illera Palacio. Other radio personalities who also influenced him were Carlos Consuegra Donado and Tomás Barraza Manotas. His first work was as a disk jockey for Variedades radio station, and he later practiced at Radio Reloj. He was Édgar Perea's commercial announcer and assistant at Riomar radio station, a copywriter and an Account Executive for Sonovista Advertising Co. and a columnist for El Heraldo newspaper. In 1971, along with Édgar Perea, Fabio Poveda, Jorge Humberto Klee, Chaco Senior and Cheíto Feliciano, he created the Panamericana de la Costa radio station (from the Sutatenza radio station) during the Pan American Games in Cali to broadcast the games for the Colombian Caribbean region.

== Consolidations ==
Towards the end of 1977 González went to Bogotá and began to work at Punch Televisión. He was a commentator for the 1978 Soccer World Cup. 1978 was the year when color television started in Colombia. He worked as Caracol commercial director in Cali, as a radio talk host for Todelar in Barranquilla and for Sutatenza in Bogotá.

In the early 1980s he hosted the "Suena la campana" (The Bell Rings) boxing program on national TV. By the end of that decade, he hosted the "Sábados Espectaculares" (Spectacular Saturdays) variety show on the regional channel, Telecaribe, where he was known as "The Man with the Hat" and with which he won the India Catalina Award. In 1988 he won the Postobón National Award for his documentary "Campeón a la colombiana, campeón a la americana" (Colombian champion, American champion), where he portrayed the differences in resources and means between an American boxing champion as Sugar Ray Leonard and the Colombian boxing champion Fidel Bassa. From 1984 to 1994 he hosted the "La Verdad" (The Truth) radio program on Emisora Atlántico. In 1995 he hosted "Tempranito y de Mañana" (Early in the morning) on Barranquilla's Uniautónoma Estéreo.

== Information Technology Pioneer ==
González was an innovator and a visionary in Information Technology. In 1981 he incorporated Information Technology to journalism in Colombia, obtaining soccer and baseball statistics in dBase 3. Around 1983 he used the Internet and incorporated it to his work accessing Major League Baseball statistics. From 1995 to 1996, he directed the Sport Colombia sports web portal and from 1999 to 2000, Satelitecaribe.com. Currently, his radio show Satélite is broadcast live on the Internet.

== Last activities ==
González hosted the Satélite radio show on Emisora Atlántico, a variety show also broadcast live on the Internet. In 2008 he founded the Caribe Sano Foundation to carry out activities in aid of the coastal region people.
