= Benjamin F. Register =

United States Army general

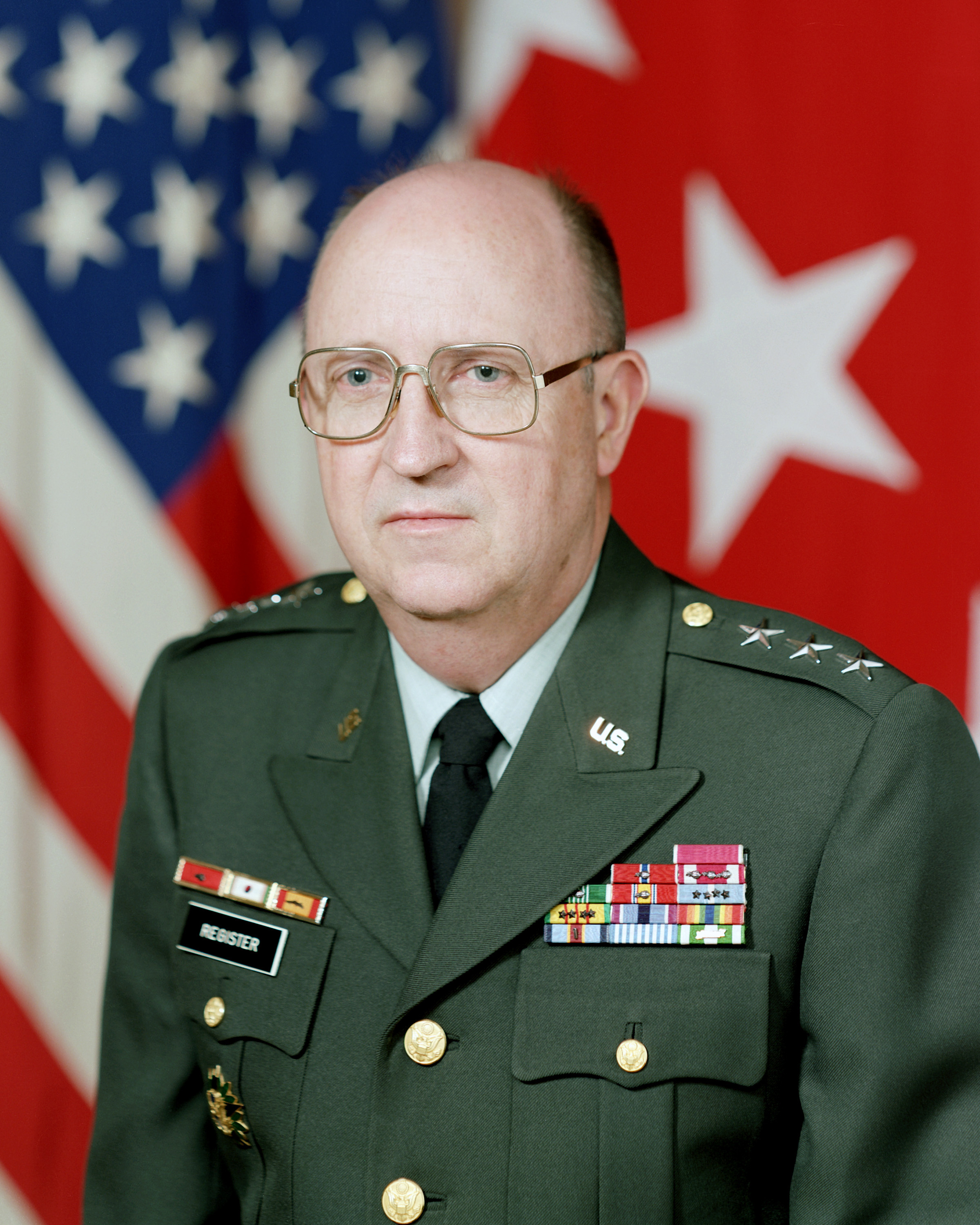
- Born: 10 June 1930; Columbus, Georgia, U.S.
- Died: 5 August 2019 (aged 89); Opelika, Alabama, U.S.
- Military career
- Allegiance: United States
- Branch: United States Army
- Service years: 1951–1987
- Rank: Lieutenant general
- Commands: Deputy Chief of Staff for Logistics
- Conflicts: Korean War; Vietnam War
- Awards: Legion of Merit; Bronze Star Medal (2); Meritorious Service Medal (4)

Benjamin Franklin Register Jr. (10 June 1930 – 5 August 2019) was a lieutenant general in the United States Army. His assignments included Deputy Chief of Staff for Logistics. Register was commissioned as a distinguished military graduate from the Georgia Institute of Technology in 1951, and served until his retirement in 1987. He earned a B.S. degree in industrial management from Georgia Tech and later earned an M.S. degree in military logistics management from the Air Force Institute of Technology.

After his death, Register was interred at Fort Mitchell National Cemetery in Alabama on 8 August 2019.
