= Rodolfo Zapata (singer) =

Argentinian singer (1932–2019)

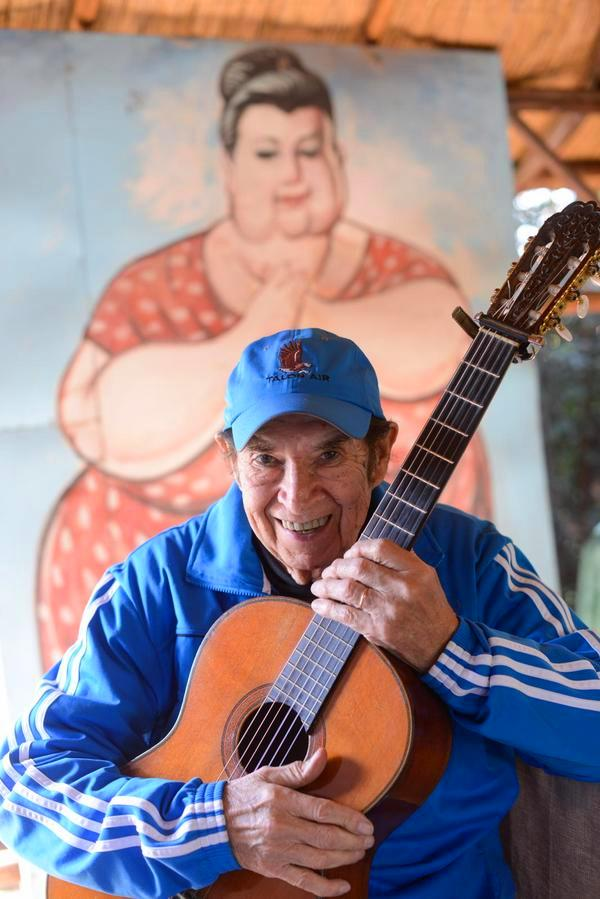
- Born: 10 May 1932; Buenos Aires, Argentina
- Died: 1 August 2019 (aged 87); Buenos Aires, Argentina
- Occupation(s): Singer songwriter musician actor
- Years active: 1946–2019
- Children: Rodolfo Zapata Jr, Guillermo Zapata

Rodolfo Zapata (10 May 1932 – 1 August 2019) was an Argentine singer, songwriter, musician, and actor. He had an extensive career, and was popular throughout Latin America.
