= Paul Peterson (Canadian football) =

Canadian football player (1921–2019)

Profile
- Position: Halfback

Personal information
- Born: February 26, 1921; Kitchener, Ontario, Canada
- Died: August 27, 2019 (aged 98); Kitchener, Ontario, Canada
- Listed height: 5 ft 9 in (1.75 m)
- Listed weight: 180 lb (82 kg)

Career history
- 1943–1950: Hamilton Flying Wildcats

Awards and highlights
- Grey Cup champion (1943)

Paul Peterson (February 26, 1921 – August 27, 2019) was a Canadian professional football player who played for the Hamilton Flying Wildcats, winning the Grey Cup with them in 1943. He was the last surviving member of the championship team.
