= Valeriy Syrov =

Ukrainian Soviet footballer (1946–2019)

Personal information
- Full name: Valeriy Mykhaylovych Syrov
- Date of birth: 1 September 1946
- Place of birth: Novosibirsk, Russian SFSR
- Date of death: 28 August 2019 (aged 72)
- Place of death: Mykolaiv, Ukraine
- Height: 1.76 m (5 ft 9 1/2 in)
- Position: Defender

Senior career*
Years	Team	Apps	(Gls)
1966	Avtomobilist Leningrad	?	(?)
1967	Zenit Leningrad	5	(0)
1968–1973	Karpaty Lviv	159	(0)
1973	→SK Lutsk (loan)	?	(0)
1973–1974	Metalurh Zaporizhya	35	(5)
1975–1976	Karpaty Lviv	39	(0)
1977	Miedź Legnica	?	(?)
1978–1981	Sokil Lviv	?	(?)
1982–1985	Tsementnyk Mykolaiv	?	(?)

Managerial career
- 1982–1985: Tsementnyk Mykolaiv (player-manager)
- 1992: Sokil-LORTA Lviv
- 2003: Ocean Mykolaiv
- 2010: Karpaty Lviv (assistant)
- * Club domestic league appearances and goals

Valeriy Syrov (Ukrainian: Валерій Михайлович Сиров; 1 September 1946 – 28 August 2019) was a Ukrainian Soviet-era professional football player who played as defender and after his retirement worked as a football manager.

== Playing and coaching career ==
Syrov began to play football only at the age of 19 and the main part of his career was spent in the Western Ukraine club Karpaty Lviv. In 1969 he participated in the team victory in the Soviet Cup competition where in the final at Luzhniki Stadium they beat Rostov Army team.

After his retirement he worked as an assistant manager in the different football clubs.

He died in Mykolaiv on 28 August 2019.

== Honours ==
- Soviet Cup winner: 1969.
