= Donald F. Klein =

American psychiatrist (1928–2019)

- Born: Donald Franklin Klein; September 4, 1928; New York City, New York, U.S.
- Died: August 7, 2019 (aged 90); New York City, New York, U.S.
- Education: Colby College; New York University; SUNY Downstate College of Medicine
- Occupation: Psychiatrist
- Spouse: Rachel Kravetz (m. 1967)
- Children: 5

Donald Franklin Klein (September 4, 1928 – August 7, 2019) was an American psychiatrist who worked on anxiety, mood, and psychotic disorders. He played an important role in the early development of psychopharmacology and biological psychiatry.

Klein entered psychiatry at a time when psychotherapy was the norm for treatment of mental illness and social and personal factors were the causes of mental disorders. In this context, he used scientific studies to establish that medications were effective treatments for certain disorders.

Using analyses of patients’ differing responses to the same medication, he developed the concept of pharmacologic dissection that distinguished between disorders and subgroups within a disorder. Dissection, he argued, allowed one to 'pierce through the fascinating, confusing web of symptoms and dysfunctions to tease out the major participant variables by attending to specific drug effects'.

From 1976 until he retired in 2006, he was professor of psychiatry at Columbia University in New York and medical director of the New York State Psychiatric Institute.

== Early life ==
Klein was born in New York City. His father, Jesse, sold orthopedic shoes, and his mother, Rose (Bogachik) Klein, was a homemaker. He grew up in the Bronx and attended the Bronx High School of Science. He earned a bachelor’s degree at Colby College in Maine in 1947 at the age of eighteen, first in his class. As a Jew, he was unable to get into medical school, and entered the graduate program in biochemistry and physiology at New York University. Subsequently, he enrolled in the State University of New York School of Medicine (Downstate), where he earned his MD in 1952. In addition to his medical training, he was a candidate at the New York Psychoanalytic Institute from 1957-61.

== Work ==
Klein published more than 500 peer-reviewed papers and more than 100 chapters, as well as foundational books on psychopharmacology. He was a mentor, teacher, and advisor to countless psychiatrists. He played a key role in developing psychiatry as a scientific discipline, utilizing clinical observation, patient self-reports, psychopharmacological response, laboratory testing, and statistical analysis. His work led to more nuanced descriptions of many psychiatric disorders and incorporated many principles from other medical fields into research of mental disorders.

He said that childhood separation anxiety was a frequent precursor of adult panic disorder, which led to separation anxiety disorder as a specific condition.

His research on schizophrenia identified premorbid social adjustment as a predictor of future outcome and established the value of starting treatment as early as possible instead of waiting for the patient to develop full-blown psychotic symptoms.

Using psychopharmacological dissection, Klein distinguished atypical depression from melancholic depression, and showed that their treatment differed. Monoamine oxidase inhibitors were the treatment of choice rather than tricyclic antidepressants for atypical depression.He identified excessive sensitivity to rejection, a hallmark of atypical depression, as a particular target for the dopamine enhancing effects of the monoamine oxidase inhibitors.

He was also a pioneer in the treatment of childhood disorders and conducted early trials of stimulants in children with ADHD, and tricyclics in separation anxiety.

One of the areas where Klein had the most profound effect was in the anxiety disorders. At the time he began his work mainstream psychiatry's standard of diagnostic classification was the DSM II, which lumped most anxiety conditions under the rubric of anxiety neurosis. Studying the effects of imipramine, a then newly developed medication already shown to be helpful for depression, Klein found that certain individuals hospitalized psychiatrically for severe anxiety and agoraphobia suffered from unexpected panic attacks that generated their behavioral avoidance. Moreover, imipramine was very effective in blocking these panic attacks, which then led to lessening fear of having a panic (anticipatory anxiety) and subsequent lessening or cessation of the agoraphobia. This led not only to significant advances in treating anxiety disorders, but also a revised classification in DSM III in which panic disorder was distinguished from generalized anxiety disorder, and agoraphobia with panic attacks was classified separately from other phobic disorders.

Klein was a mentor and clinician. Several individuals who studied or worked with him later contributed to mental health care. As a clinician, he treated patients who had previously received care from other psychiatrists.

== Career ==
Klein served his psychiatric residency in the 1950’s at Creedmoor Psychiatric Center in Queens, New York. In 1954-56 he served in the US Public Health Service at Lexington Narcotic Hospital, Kentucky. In 1959, he took a position at Hillside Hospital in Queens in the Department of Experimental Psychiatry.

In 1976, he went to Columbia University as tenured Professor of Psychiatry, and as Director of Research and chief of the Division of Therapeutics at the New York State Psychiatric Institute. At the time of his death, he was Emeritus Professor of Psychiatry at the Columbia University Vagelos College of Physicians and Surgeons and the New York State Psychiatric Institute and Research Professor at New York University Langone Medical Center.

== Personal life ==
Klein’s first marriage, to Estelle Manette (later Estelle Raben), ended in divorce. He married Rachel Gittelman, a clinical psychologist, in 1967. They had five daughters.

While he was dedicated to his work, he loved spending time at his home overlooking the Atlantic Ocean on Long Island, and also traveling to France with his wife Rachel.

== Selected publications ==
Klein DF, Davis JM, Diagnosis and Drug Treatment of Psychiatric Disorders, Baltimore, Md: Williams & Wilkins, 1969.

Klein DF, Gittelman R, Quitkin F, et al. Diagnosis and Drug Treatment of Psychiatric Disorders: Adults and Children. 2nd ed. Baltimore: Williams & Wilkins, 1983.

Klein DF, Wender PH, Understanding Depression: A Complete Guide to Its Diagnosis and Treatment, Oxford University Press, 1993, 2005.
