= Jian Ming =

Chinese poet, writer, literary critic, and editor (1961–2019)

Jian Ming (Chinese: 简明; April 1961 – 21 August 2019) was the pen name of Zhang Guoming (张国明), a Chinese poet, writer, literary critic and editor.

== Biography ==
Zhang Guoming was born in April 1961 into a military family in Xinjiang. In 1991, his military-themed work Qian Ri Yang Bing (千日养兵) was awarded the National Excellent Reportage Award (now part of the Lu Xun Literary Prize), bringing him fame at the age of 30.

Jian Ming later published 15 poetry collections, including Noble (高贵), Pusu (朴素), and Shan Shui Jing (山水经). He was awarded the Sun Li Literary Prize, the Wen Yiduo Poetry Prize, and the Chen Zi'ang Poetry Prize (2017). His poetry has been translated into English, French, German, Spanish, Russian, Japanese, and Korean.

He served as president and Chief Editor of the Selected Poetry (诗选刊), a journal of the Hebei Writers' Association, and nurtured a number of young poets.

Jian Ming suffered from severe liver disease. He died in Shijiazhuang on 21 August 2019, aged 58.
