= Leon Wofsy =

American immunologist and activist

- Born: November 21, 1921; Stamford, Connecticut
- Died: August 25, 2019 (aged 97)
- Education: City College of New York; Yale University
- Occupations: Biochemist; Activist; Educator
- Spouse(s): Rosalind Taub (m. 1942–2009)
- Scientific career
- Fields: Immunology
- Workplaces: University of California, Berkeley

Leon Wofsy (November 21, 1921 – August 25, 2019) was an American biochemist, activist, and educator. He was the department chair and professor emeritus of Immunology in the Department of Bacteriology and Immunology at University of California, Berkeley.

== Early life ==
Wofsy was born in Stamford, Connecticut, on November 21, 1921.

In 1942 he graduated from City College of New York

In September 1943, after graduation he was drafted into the US Army.

== Career ==
Wofsy led the Communist party-affiliated Labor Youth League from its founding in 1949 to 1956.

He fought against racism and war and for free speech.

He became disillusioned with Communism after Stalin's atrocities became widely publicized in the West. After leaving the Communist Party in 1956, Wofsy worked as a chemist at Armstrong Rubber Co. before being appointed as a teacher at North Branford High School.

He resumed graduate studies at Yale University in September 1958 and graduated with a PhD in chemistry in May 1961.

After several rejections, he joined the faculty at the University of California, Berkeley in 1964.

Wofsy pioneered medical research on the use of antibodies to deliver efficient treatments precisely to the site of disease.

He died on August 25, 2019.

== Personal life ==
Leon married Rosalind "Roz" Taub in 1942. They had two children, Carla Wofsy, who died of breast cancer in 2003, and David Wofsy. Leon has four grand children, Danielle, Grace, Kevin, and Susan.

At the age of 88 Roz died on April 23, 2009.

On November 4, 2010, Leon married Gail M. Weininger.
