= Robert Judd (musicologist) =

American musicologist (1956–2019)

- Born: Robert Floyd Judd; February 12, 1956; Ohio, U.S.
- Died: August 24, 2019 (aged 63); Bronxville, New York, U.S.

Academic background
- Education: Kent State University (BA); Rice University (MA); University of Oxford (PhD)
- Thesis: The Use of Notational Formats at the Keyboard (1989)

Academic work
- Discipline: Musicology
- Sub-discipline: Renaissance keyboard music
- Institutions: California State University, Fresno; American Musicological Society

Robert Floyd Judd (February 12, 1956 – August 24, 2019) was an American musicologist who served as the executive director of the American Musicological Society from September 1996 until his death on August 24, 2019.

== Early life and education ==
Judd was raised in Shaker Heights, Ohio, where he began performing music as a child. He earned an undergraduate degree in organ performance from Kent State University, master's degree in musicology from Rice University, and a doctorate in musicology from the University of Oxford. His doctoral thesis was titled, The Use of Notational Formats at the Keyboard.

== Career ==
Judd's academic research focused on Renaissance-era keyboard music. He became a tenured professor at the California State University, Fresno. In 1996, he became the executive director of the American Musicological Society at New York University. He served in the position for 23 years.

== Death ==
Judd died on August 24, 2019, in Bronxville, New York.
