= Emil Svoboda =

Czech footballer (1928–2019)

Personal information
- Date of birth: 16 August 1928
- Date of death: 11 August 2019 (aged 90)

International career
Years	Team	Apps	(Gls)
1955–1957	Czechoslovakia	5	(0)

Emil Svoboda (16 August 1928 – 11 August 2019) was a Czech footballer. He played in five matches for the Czechoslovakia national football team from 1955 to 1957.
