= 2019 in science =

A number of significant scientific events occurred in 2019.

== Events ==
=== January ===
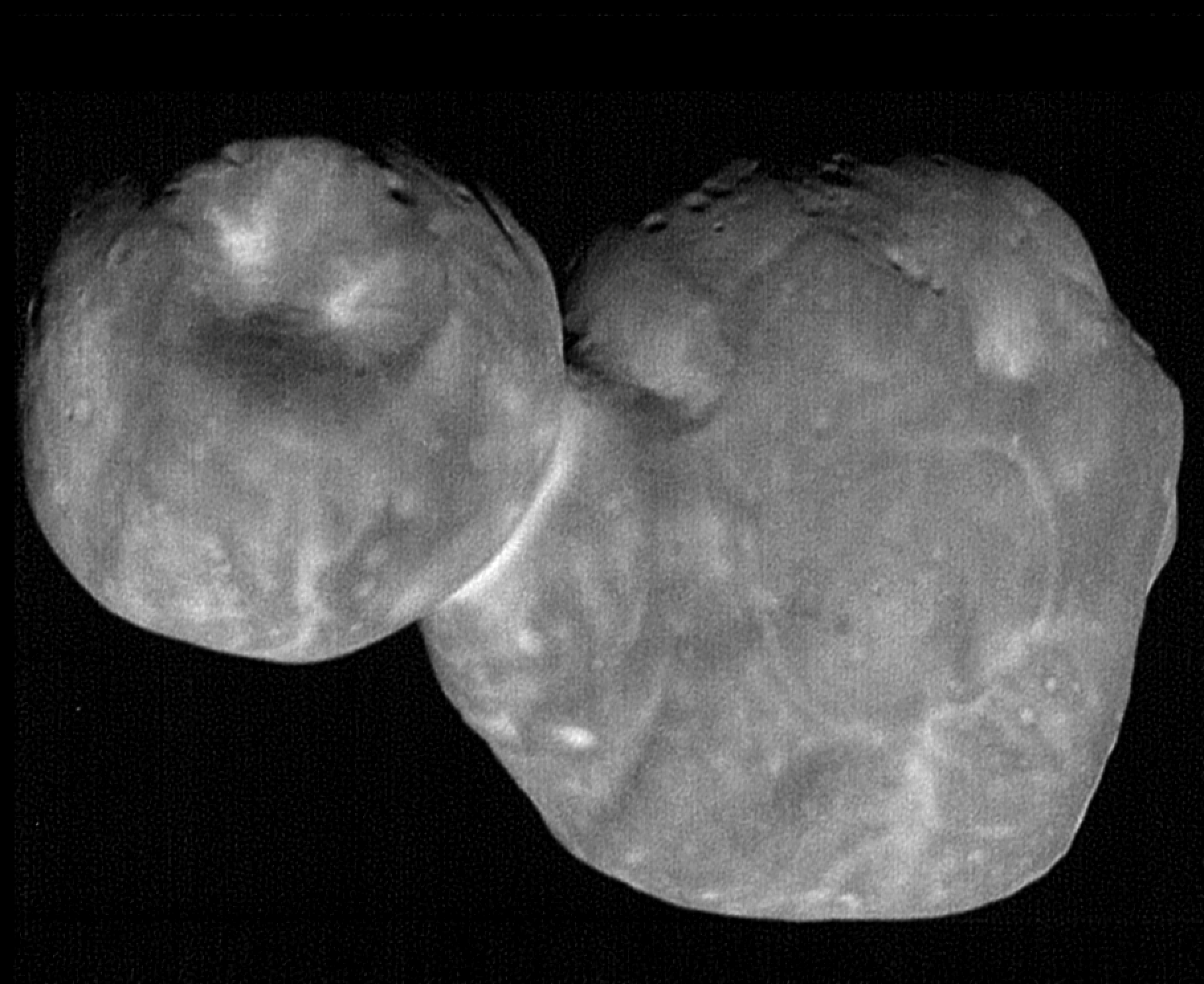
1 January: The New Horizons space probe flies by 486958 Arrokoth, a remote Kuiper belt object (3D version).

- 1 January – The New Horizons space probe flies by Kuiper belt object 486958 Arrokoth (nicknamed Ultima Thule), the outermost close encounter of any Solar System object.
- 2 January – A study finds that tons of methane, a greenhouse gas, are released into the atmosphere by melting ice sheets in Greenland.
- 3 January
  - China's National Space Administration (CNSA) achieves the first soft landing on the far side of the Moon with its Chang'e 4 mission.
  - Scientists report the engineering of crops with a photorespiratory "shortcut" to boost plant growth by 40% in real-world agronomic conditions.
- 4 January
  - Researchers at Ecole polytechnique fédérale de Lausanne (EPFL) report a way to control properties of excitons and change the polarisation of light they generate, which could lead to transistors that undergo less energy loss and heat dissipation.
  - Researchers design an inhalable form of messenger RNA aerosol that could be administered directly to the lungs to help treat diseases such as cystic fibrosis.
- 6 January
  - A partial solar eclipse occurred.
- 8 January
  - Researchers from the U.S. Department of Energy's Princeton Plasma Physics Laboratory (PPPL) report a new way to stabilise the "tearing modes" in fusion reactors, using radio waves to create small changes in the temperature of the plasma, allowing it to be controlled more easily.
  - IBM unveils IBM Q System One, its first integrated quantum computing system for commercial use.
- 9 January
  - Astronomers announce the discovery of a second repeating fast radio burst (FRB) source, named FRB 180814.
  - The first SD card with a storage capacity of 1 terabyte (TB) is announced by Lexar.
  - Astronomers at the University of Warwick present the first direct evidence of white dwarf stars solidifying into crystals.

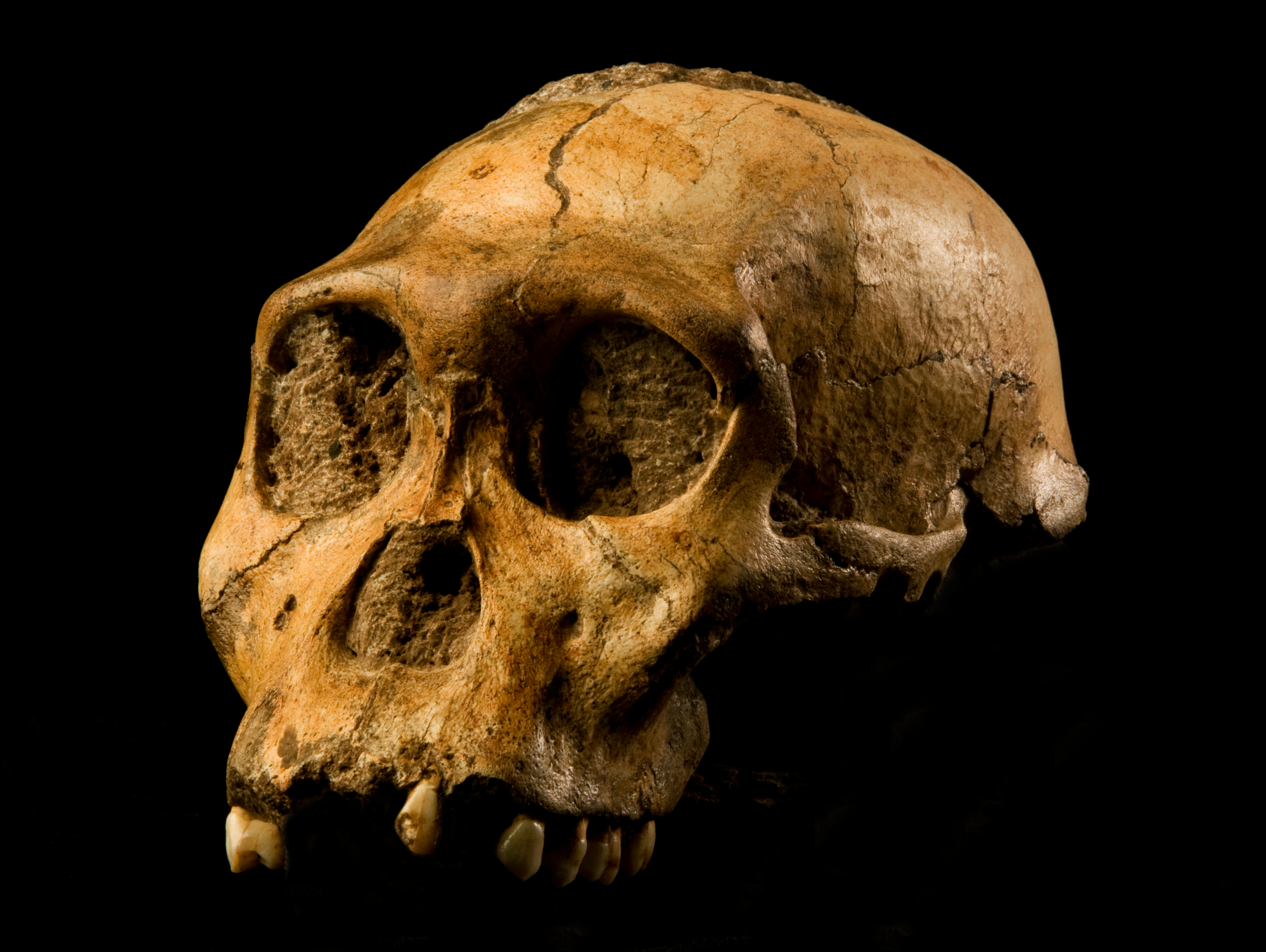
17 January: Australopithecus sediba found to be distinct from, but similar to, both the older Australopithecus africanus and the younger Homo habilis.

- 10 January – Astronomers propose that AT2018cow, a very powerful astronomical explosion, 10–100 times brighter than a normal supernova, may have been a white dwarf being pulled apart by a black hole; or, a supernova leaving behind a black hole or a neutron star, the creation of a compact body being observed for the first time.
- 11 January – Researchers at the University of Michigan demonstrate a new approach to 3D printing, based on the lifting of shapes from a vat of liquid, which is up to 100 times faster than conventional processes.
- 14 January – A study in the journal PNAS finds that Antarctica experienced a sixfold increase in yearly ice mass loss between 1979 and 2017.
- 16 January – A study in Ecological Monographs suggests there may be sustained foraging specialization, fasting and omnivory in the whale shark (Rhincodon typus), the world's largest fish.
- 17 January
  - Scientists report that Australopithecus sediba is distinct from, but shares anatomical similarities to, both the older Australopithecus africanus, and the younger Homo habilis.
  - Astronomers report that a day on the planet Saturn has been determined to be 10^{h} 33^{m} 38^{s} ^{+ 1^{m} 52^{s}}_{− 1^{m} 19^{s}}, based on studies of the planet's C Ring.
- 21 January
  - Scientists report that the Greenland ice sheet is melting four times faster than in 2003, with its largest sustained ice loss coming from the southwest region.
  - Lunar eclipse
- 22 January – Alphabet's Waymo subsidiary announces that it will later in 2019 begin construction in the US State of Michigan on the World's first factory for mass-producing autonomous vehicles.
- 23 January
  - Scientists in China report the creation of five identical cloned gene-edited monkeys, using the same cloning technique that was used with Zhong Zhong and Hua Hua – the first-ever cloned monkeys – and Dolly the sheep, and the same gene-editing CRISPR-Cas9 technique allegedly used by He Jiankui in creating the first-ever gene-modified human babies Lulu and Nana. The genetically modified monkey clones were made in order to study several medical diseases.
  - Astronomers report the first-ever detection of glycolonitrile, another possible building block of life among other such molecules, in outer space.

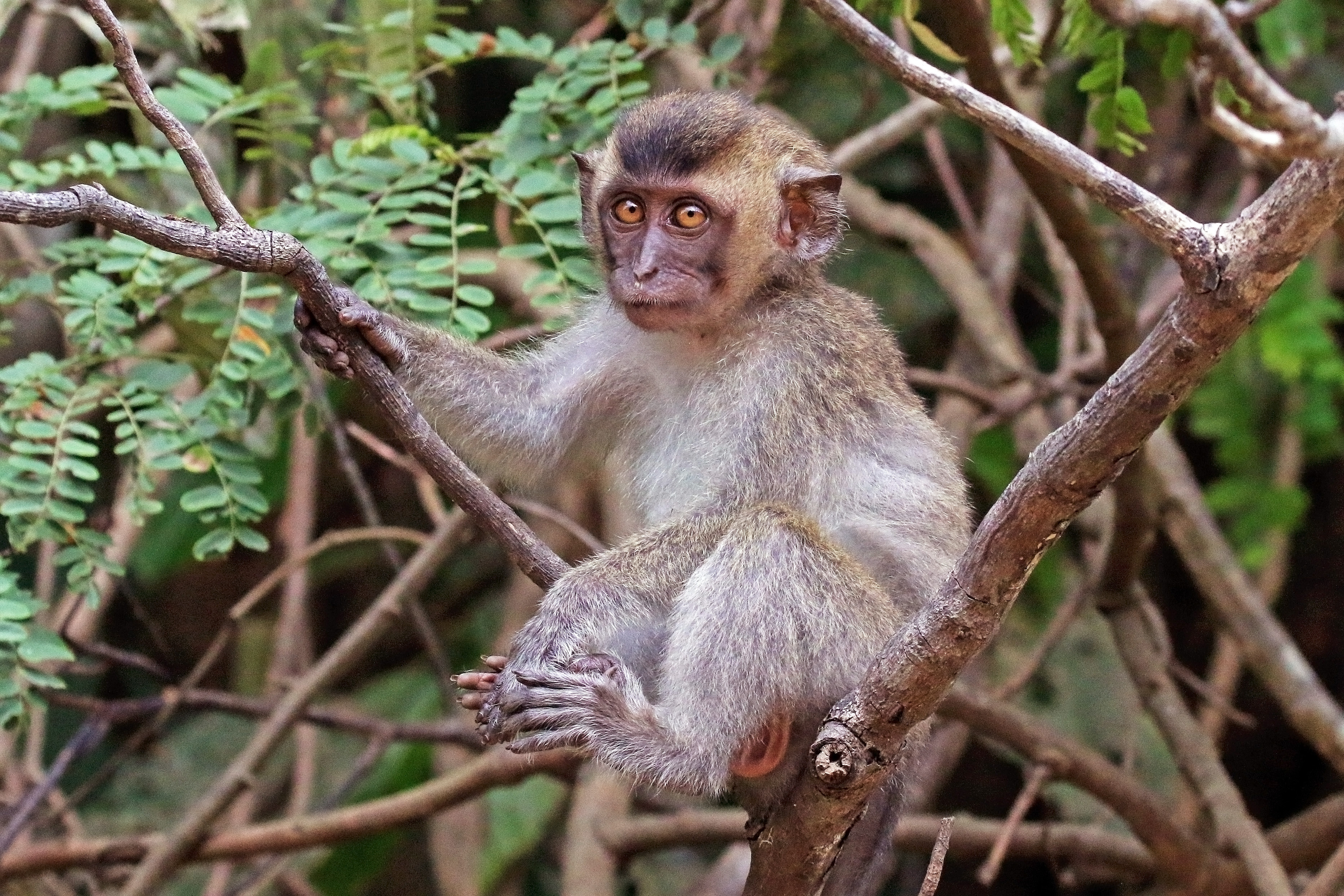
23 January: Five identical cloned gene-edited monkeys (similar to the one pictured above) created, in order to study several medical diseases.

- 24 January
  - NASA announces that the Opportunity rover has been on the planet Mars for 15 years.
  - NASA scientists report the discovery of the oldest known Earth rock – on the Moon. Apollo 14 astronauts returned several rocks from the Moon and later, scientists determined that a fragment from one of the rocks contained "a bit of Earth from about 4 billion years ago." The rock fragment contained quartz, feldspar, and zircon, all common on the Earth, but highly uncommon on the Moon.
  - The complete axolotl genome is reported to have been sequenced by the University of Kentucky.
- 25 January – AlphaStar, a new artificial intelligence algorithm by Alphabet's DeepMind subsidiary, defeats professional players of the real-time strategy game StarCraft II in ten rounds out of eleven.
- 29 January – Researchers at Purdue University's College of Engineering release a paper in the journal ACS Sustainable Chemistry & Engineering detailing a new process to turn plastic waste in hydrocarbon fuels.
- 30 January – Scientists report that several types of humans, including Denisovans, Neanderthals and related hybrids, may have inhabited the Denisova Cave in Siberia over thousands of years, but it is unclear whether they ever shared the cave.
- 31 January
  - Researchers at the University of California, Berkeley, demonstrate a new form of 3D printer, which uses light exposure to transform a viscous liquid into complex solid objects.
  - A new AI developed by RMIT at University of Melbourne and trained to play the 1980s video game Montezuma's Revenge is reported to be 10 times faster than Google DeepMind and able to finish the game.

=== February ===
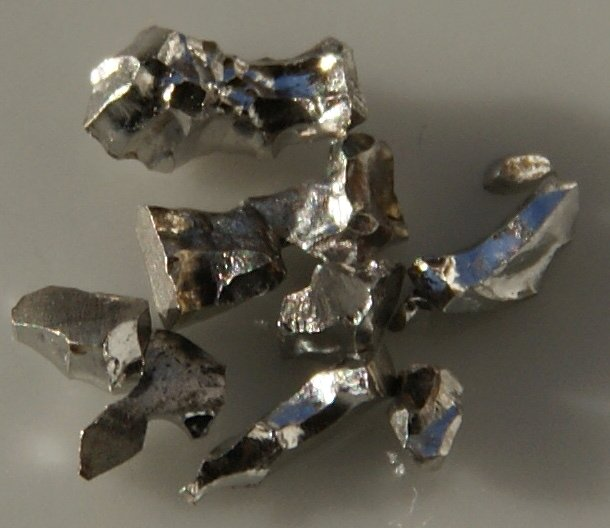
3 February: Medical scientists announce that iridium (image above) attached to albumin produces a photosensitized molecule able to penetrate and, via photodynamic therapy, destroy cancer cells.

- 1 February – NASA scientists report that the Mars Curiosity rover determined, for the first time, the density of Mount Sharp in Gale crater, thereby establishing a clearer understanding of how the mountain was formed.
- 3 February – Medical scientists announce that iridium attached to albumin, creating a photosensitized molecule, can penetrate cancer cells and, after being irradiated with light (a process called photodynamic therapy), destroy the cancer cells.
- 4 February – A study by the International Centre for Integrated Mountain Development concludes that 36% of glaciers along the Hindu Kush and Himalaya range will disappear by 2100, even if carbon emissions are cut rapidly. Without emission reductions, the loss could reach two-thirds.
- 5 February – NASA reports that the two small communication CubeSats, that accompanied the InSight lander to the planet Mars, went silent, and are unlikely to be heard from again.
- 6 February
  - NASA and NOAA confirm that 2018 was the fourth hottest year on record globally, at 0.83 degrees Celsius (1.5 degrees Fahrenheit) above the 1951 to 1980 mean.
  - Scientists from the Instituto de Astrofísica de Canarias publish the first evidence of a collision between exoplanets, which is believed to have occurred in the Kepler-107 system, approximately 1,670 light years from Earth.
- 7 February
  - Medical scientists working with Sangamo Therapeutics, headquartered in Richmond, California, announce the first-ever "in body" human gene editing therapy to permanently alter DNA in a patient with Hunter syndrome. Clinical trials by Sangamo Therapeutics involving gene editing using Zinc Finger Nuclease (ZFN) are ongoing.
  - The ExoMars rover, scheduled to launch in July 2020 and search for the existence of past life on the planet Mars, has been officially named the Rosalind Franklin rover after DNA pioneer Rosalind Franklin.
  - Scientists announce the discovery of a new type of magnet that might benefit the performance of data storage technologies.

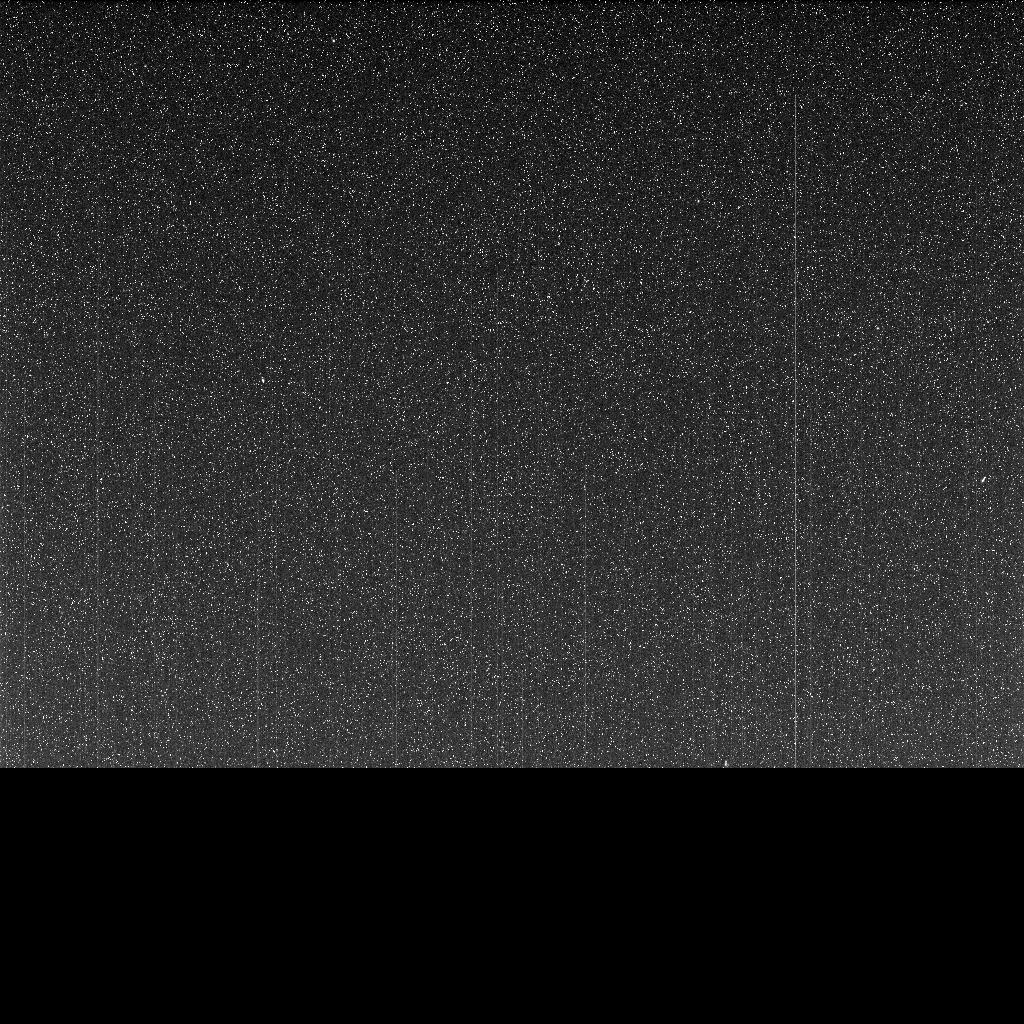
13 February: Mars Opportunity rover mission ends; last image (see above) of 228,771 total over nearly 15 years.

- 8 February – NASA scientists, studying the latest returned images and data, report that 486958 Arrokoth, the remote Kuiper Belt Object visited by the New Horizons spacecraft, was determined to be more flattened than thought earlier; and has been described to be more like a large "pancake" (larger lobe) and a "walnut" (smaller lobe), rather than two ellipsoids.
- 11 February – Scientists find evidence, based on genetics studies using artificial intelligence (AI), that suggest the existence of an unknown human ancestor species, not Neanderthal, Denisovan or human hybrid (like Denny (hybrid hominin)), in the genome of modern humans.
- 13 February – NASA officials declare that the Mars rover Opportunity has ended its mission, after failing to respond to repeated transmitted wake-up signals. Its last contact was on 10 June 2018 (Click here for the last panorama image.)
- 18 February
  - A British woman becomes the first person in the world to have gene therapy for age-related macular degeneration (AMD).
  - Scientists use gene therapy to restore hearing in an adult mouse model of DFNB9 deafness.
- 19 February
  - Researchers at Oxford Martin School publish evidence that, in the longer term, some forms of cultured meat could be worse for the environment than traditional farmed meat.
  - Scientists report evidence, based on isotope studies, that at least some Neanderthals may have eaten meat.

21 February: Report of Hachimoji DNA, an 8-base DNA, that has a similar structure (above) as the 4-base natural DNA.

- 21 February
  - Scientists announce a new form of DNA, named Hachimoji DNA, composed of four natural, and four unnatural nucleobases. Benefits of such an eight-base DNA system may include an enhanced ability to store digital data, as well as insights into what may be possible in the search for extraterrestrial life.
  - Scientists report that the purportedly first-ever germline genetically edited humans, the twin babies Lulu and Nana, by Chinese researcher He Jiankui, may have inadvertently (or perhaps, intentionally) had their brains enhanced.
  - SpaceX launches SpaceIL's Beresheet probe, the world's first privately financed mission to the Moon.
  - Astronomers led by Scott S. Sheppard announce the discovery of FarFarOut, the most distant object yet found in the Solar System, at an estimated distance of 140 AU (21 billion km) from the Sun.
- 25 February
  - Scientists report evidence that Neanderthals walked upright much like modern humans.
  - The first microSD card with a storage capacity of 1 terabyte (TB) is announced by Micron.
- 26 February – Researchers at RMIT University demonstrate a method of using a liquid metal catalyst to turn carbon dioxide gas back into coal, potentially offering a new way to store carbon in solid form.
- 28 February
  - Scientists report the first-ever evidence of a former planet-wide groundwater system on the planet Mars.
  - Scientists report the creation of mice with infrared vision, using nanoparticles injected into their eyes.

=== March ===
- 3 March – An uncrewed demonstration flight of the new crew capable version of the SpaceX Dragon spacecraft, intended to carry American astronauts into space, achieves successful autonomous docking with the International Space Station. It returned to Earth a few days later.

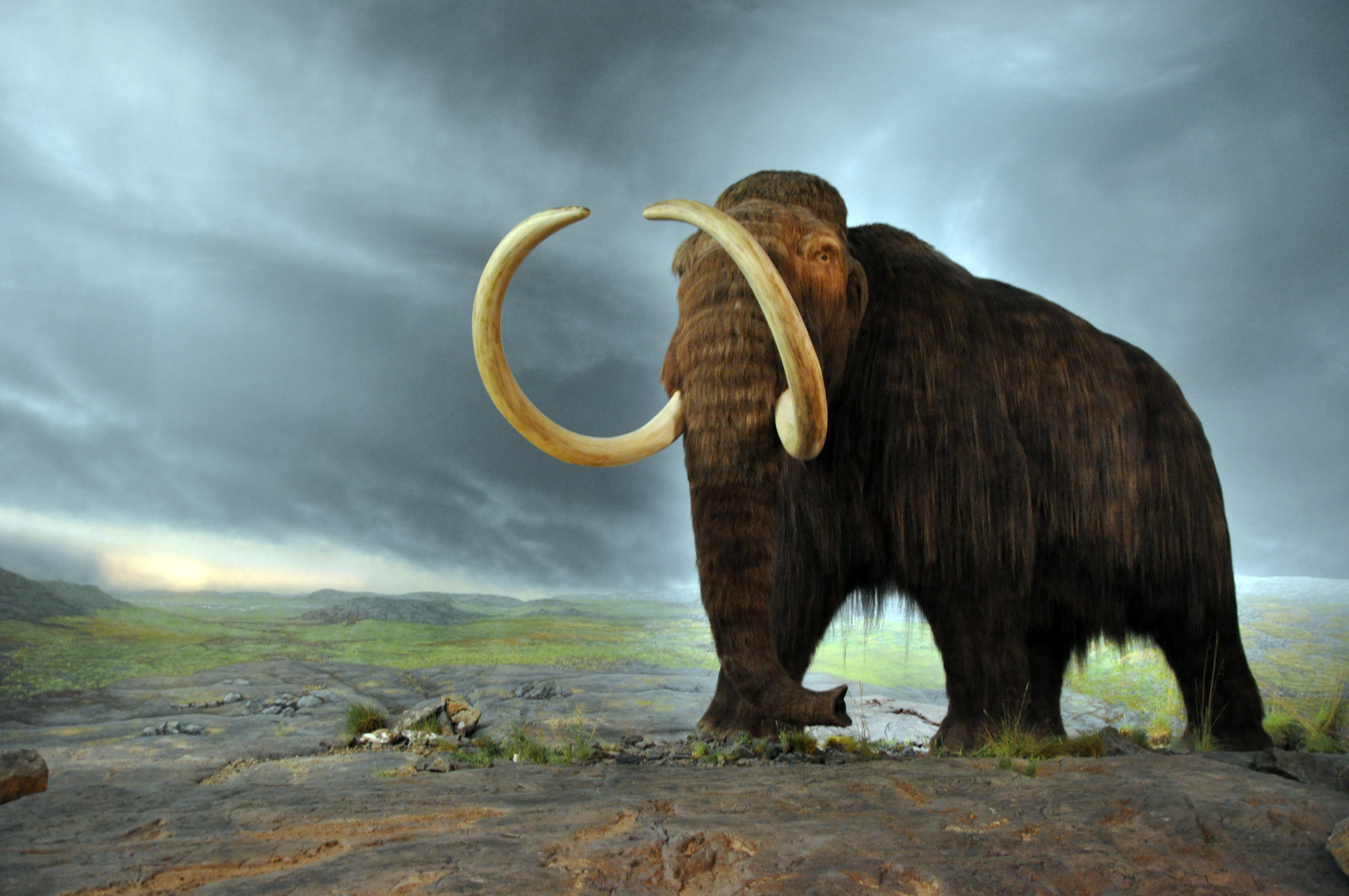
11 March: Scientists report that cell nuclei from woolly mammoth remains showed biological activity when transplanted into mouse cells.

- 4 March – Scientists report that asteroids may be much more difficult to destroy than thought earlier. In addition, an asteroid may reassemble itself due to gravity after being disrupted.
- 5 March
  - A second case of sustained remission from HIV-1 is reported, ten years after the 'Berlin Patient.'
  - Astronomers report the discovery of unusual dimming in EPIC 204376071, a star that has been observed to dim in brightness by up to 80%, much more deeply than the 22% dimming of Tabby's star.
- 7 March – Researchers at the Massachusetts Institute of Technology (MIT) demonstrate a new optical imaging system that could enable the discovery of tiny tumours, as small as 200 cells, deep within the body.
- 8 March – Astronomers report that the mass of the Milky Way galaxy is 1.5 trillion solar masses within a radius of about 129,000 light-years, over twice as much as was determined in earlier studies, and suggesting that about 90% of the mass of the galaxy is dark matter.
- 11 March – A team of Japanese and Russian scientists report that cell nuclei from woolly mammoth remains showed biological activity when transplanted into mouse cells.
- 13 March – The laser of ELI-NP in Măgurele, part of the European ELI Project, becomes the most powerful laser system ever made, reaching a peak power of 10 Petawatts.
- 15 March – NASA reports that latent viruses in humans may be activated during space missions, adding possibly more risk to astronauts in future deep-space missions.

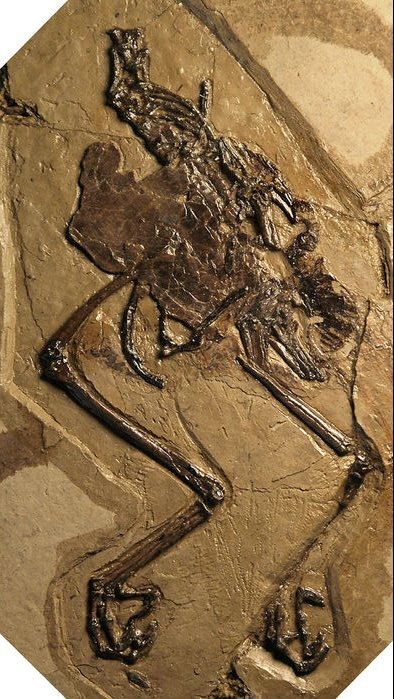
20 March: First fossil bird, named Avimaia schweitzerae, found with an unlaid egg,

- 16 March – NASA announces that a 173-kiloton fireball (the Kamchatka meteor) fell over the Bering Sea near the Kamchatka Peninsula on 18 December 2018, the second largest asteroid to hit Earth in 30 years, after the Chelyabinsk meteor. (see image)
- 18 March
  - Researchers provide supporting evidence, based on genetic studies, that modern Homo sapiens, arose first in South Africa more than 300,000 years ago, traveled to East Africa, and from there, about 60,000 years ago, traveled out of Africa to the rest of the world.
  - Physicist Adrian Bejan presents an explanation of why time seems shorter as we get older, which can be attributed to "the ever-slowing speed at which images are obtained and processed by the human brain as the body ages."
- 19 March
  - Karen Uhlenbeck is reported to be the first woman to receive the prestigious Abel Prize in Mathematics.
  - Astronomers describe scenarios where carbon monoxide may be a biosignature for a thriving community of extraterrestrial life on other worlds.
- 20 March – Paleontologists report the discovery of Avimaia schweitzerae, the first fossil bird found with an unlaid egg, that lived about 115 million years ago in Northwest China.
- 27 March
  - Scientists report that life-forms from Earth survived 18 months living in outer space outside the International Space Station (ISS), as part of the BIOMEX studies related to the EXPOSE-R2 mission, suggesting that life could survive, theoretically, on the planet Mars.
  - ESO astronomers, employing the GRAVITY instrument on their Very Large Telescope Interferometer (VLTI), announce the first direct detection of an exoplanet, HR 8799 e, using optical interferometry.
  - Chinese scientists report inserting the human brain-related MCPH1 gene into laboratory rhesus monkeys, resulting in the transgenic monkeys performing better and answering faster on "short-term memory tests involving matching colors and shapes", compared to control non-transgenic monkeys, according to the researchers.
- 28 March
  - Researchers report the possibility of ancient life on the planet Mars based on microscopic studies of the Allan Hills 77005 (ALH-77005) Martian meteorite found on Earth.
  - Scientists report evidence that suggests the planet Mars, in some near-equatorial regions, currently contains a deep groundwater system.
  - A Pew Research Center study (4464 adults; mid-January 2019) on scientific knowledge among Americans finds substantial differences based on formal education level (higher is better), race and ethnicity (whites higher) and gender (males higher). No substantial differences were found based on political affiliation.
- 29 March – Paleontologists describe a site called Tanis, in North Dakota's Hell Creek Formation, containing animal and plant fossils dated to 65.76 million years BCE. These remains are embedded with tiny rock and glass fragments that fell from the sky in the minutes and hours following the Chicxulub impact. The deposits also show evidence of having been swamped with water, caused by the subsequent megatsunamis.

=== April ===
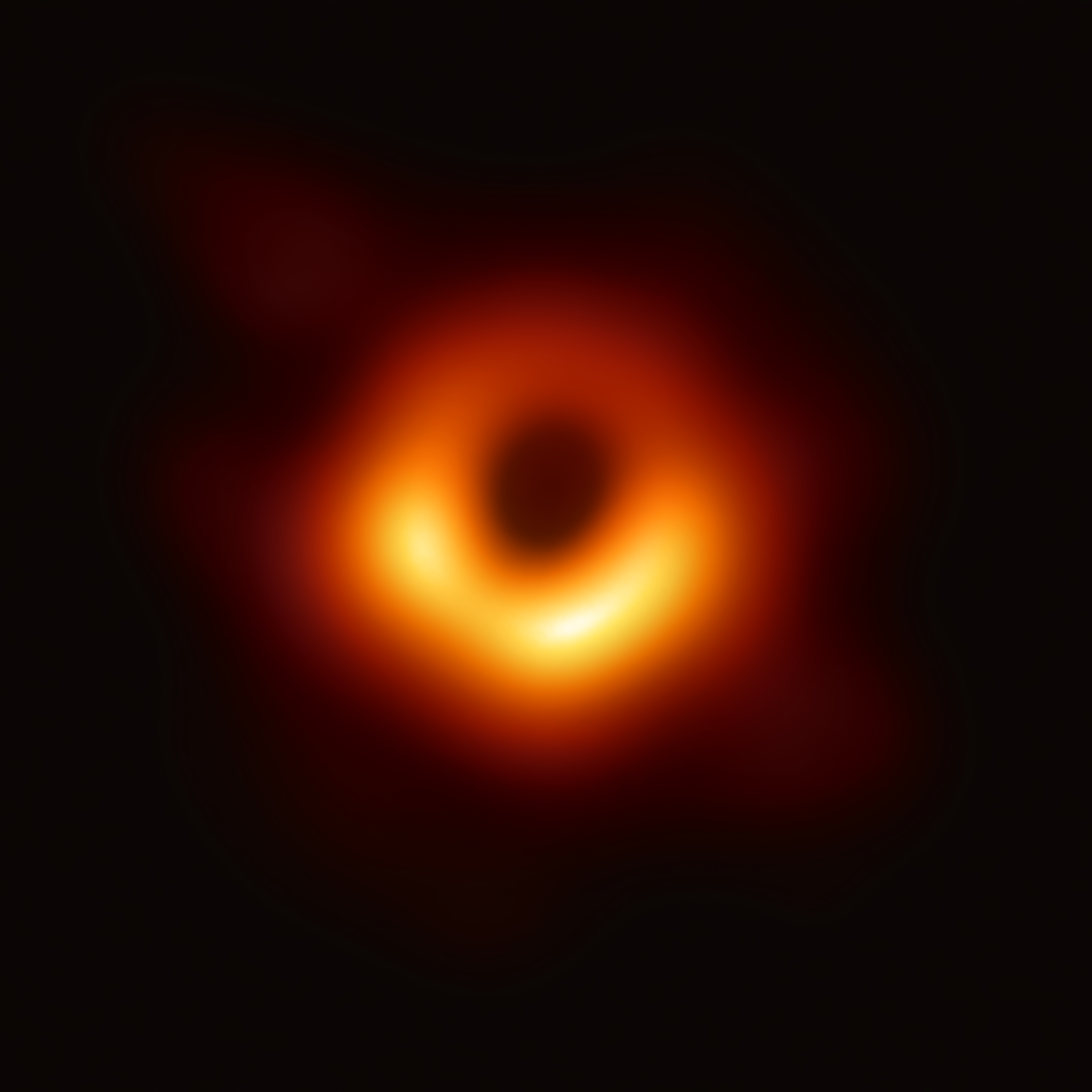
10 April: Astronomers release the first-ever image of a black hole (M87 galaxy).

- 1 April
  - Scientists report confirming the presence of methane on the planet Mars, and determining that the source of the methane likely came from an ice sheet about 300 miles east of Gale Crater. The Curiosity rover is currently exploring Gale Crater.
  - Scientists at ETH Zurich report the creation of the world's first bacterial genome, named Caulobacter ethensis-2.0, made entirely by a computer, although a related viable form of C. ethensis-2.0 does not yet exist.
- 4 April – NASA releases animated images of solar eclipses by the two moons of the planet Mars, Deimos (animation1/17 March 2019) and Phobos (animation2/27 March 2019), as viewed by the Curiosity rover on the planet Mars in March 2019.
- 7 April – NASA reports that a comprehensive study of microorganisms and fungi present on the International Space Station has been conducted. The results can be useful in improving health and safety conditions for astronauts.
- 10 April – Scientists from the Event Horizon Telescope project announce the first-ever image of a black hole, located 54 million light years away in the centre of the M87 galaxy.
- 10 April
  - Scientists find a way to view reactions in "dark states" of molecules, i.e. those states that are normally inaccessible.
- 11 April
  - NASA announces that the Curiosity rover on the planet Mars drilled into, and closely studied, a "clay-bearing unit" which, according to the rover Project Manager, is a "major milestone" in Curiosity's journey up Mount Sharp. (related image)
  - The Israeli Beresheet probe crashes on the Moon after a technical glitch causes its main engine to switch off.

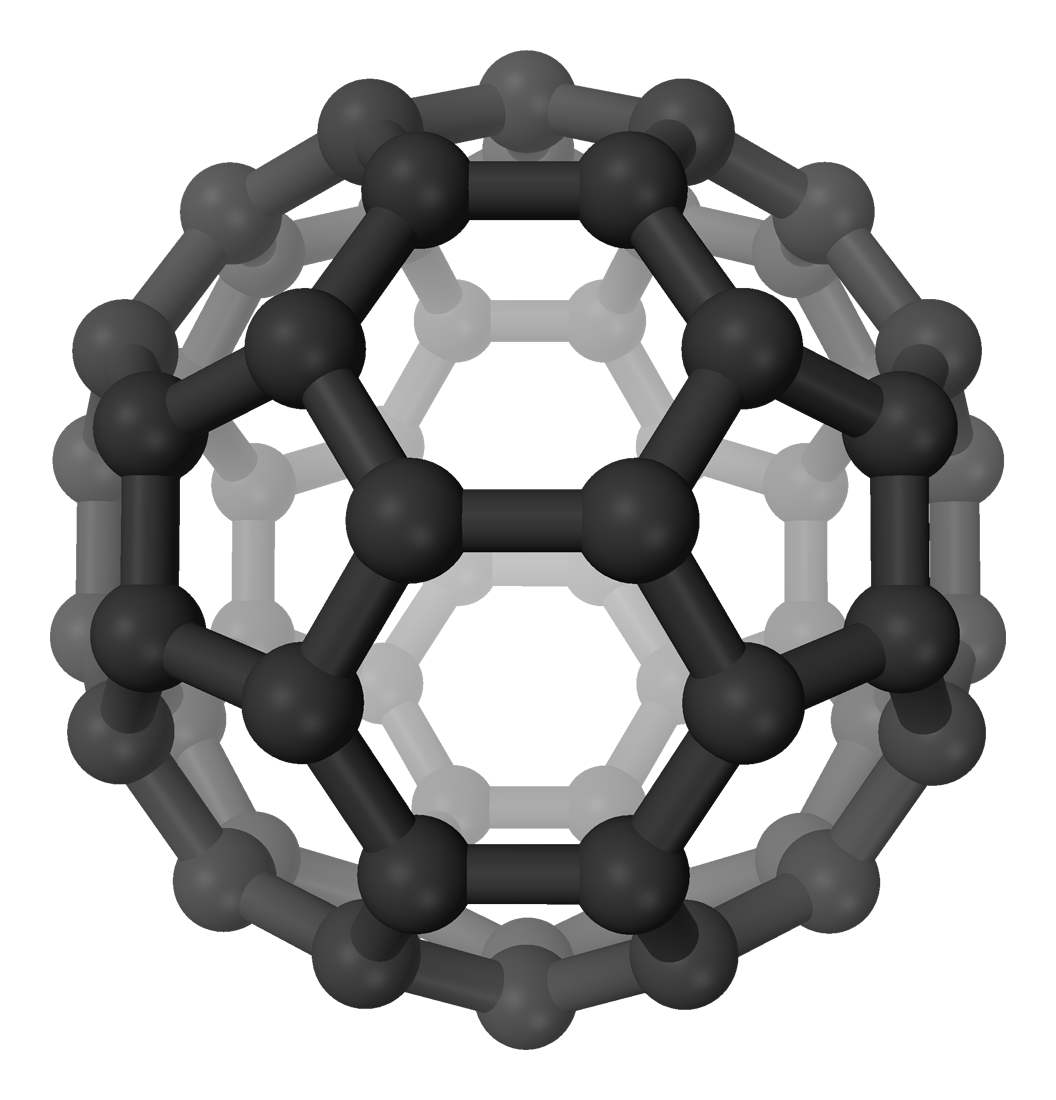
30 April: Scientists confirm the detection of buckminsterfullerene (C_{60}) (also known as "buckyballs") in the interstellar medium spaces between the stars.

- 12 April – NASA reports medical results, from an Astronaut Twin Study, where one astronaut twin spent a year in space on the International Space Station, while the other twin spent the year on Earth, which demonstrated several long-lasting changes, including those related to alterations in DNA and cognition, when one twin was compared with the other.
- 16 April – Scientists report, for the first time, the use of the CRISPR technology to edit human genes to treat cancer patients with whom standard treatments were not successful.
- 17 April – After a long search, astronomers report the detection of helium hydride, a primordial molecule thought to have been formed about 100,000 years after the Big Bang, for the first time in outer space in NGC 7027.
- 23 April – NASA reports that the Mars InSight lander detected its first Marsquake on the planet Mars. (related AudioVideo file)
- 24 April – The XENON dark matter project announces that it has observed the radioactive decay of xenon-124, which has a half-life of 1.8 sextillion years.
- 25 April – Astronomers report further substantial discrepancies, depending on the measurement method used, in determining the Hubble constant, suggesting a realm of physics currently not well understood in explaining the workings of the universe.
- 29 April – Scientists, working with the Hubble Space Telescope, confirmed the detection of the large and complex ionized molecules of buckminsterfullerene (C_{60}) (also known as "buckyballs") in the interstellar medium spaces between the stars.
- 30 April – Biologists report that the very large medusavirus, or a relative, may have been responsible, at least in part, for the evolutionary emergence of complex eukaryotic cells from simpler prokaryotic cells.

=== May ===
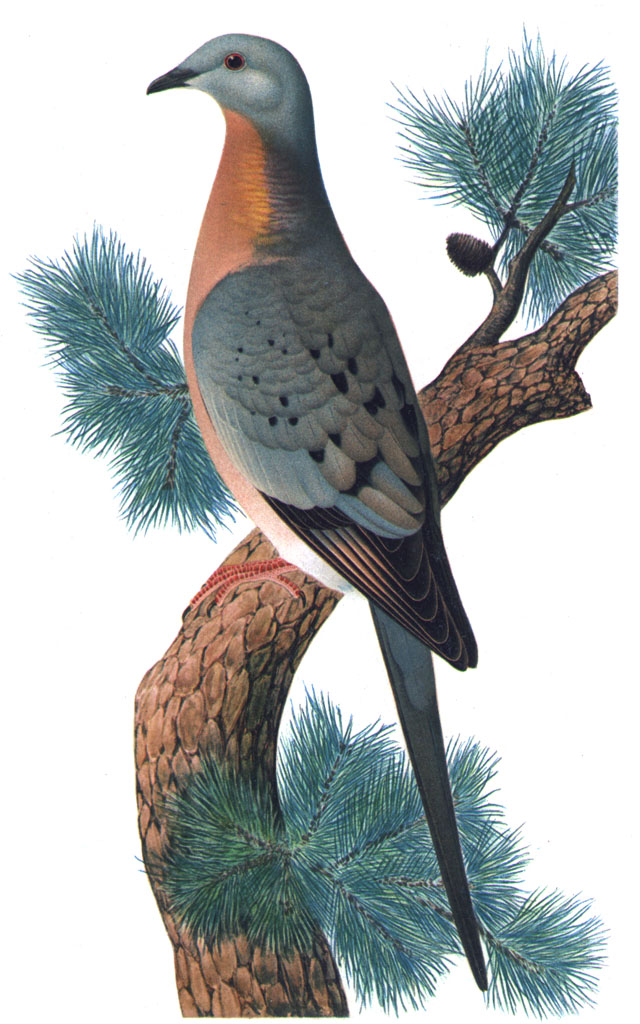
6 May: The IPBES warns that extinction of the natural living world is accelerating, largely a result of human activity – passenger pigeons are now extinct.

- 1 May – A study by U.S. researchers finds that deleting the ATDC gene can prevent the growth of pancreatic cancer in mice.
- 2 May
  - Astronomers, from the Hubble Space Telescope, release the Hubble Legacy Field Zoom Out (video; 00:50), a 16-year effort, which provides a zoom out view from the Ultra Deep Field of galaxies to the Legacy Field of galaxies.
  - A study of nearly 1,000 gay male couples who took antiretroviral therapy, published in The Lancet, finds no cases of HIV transmission over eight years.
- 3 May – The UK's National Nuclear Laboratory (NNL) and University of Leicester report the first generation of usable electricity from americium, which could lead to the development of "space batteries" that power missions for up to 400 years.
- 6 May
  - In its first report since 2005, the Intergovernmental Science-Policy Platform on Biodiversity and Ecosystem Services (IPBES) warns that biodiversity loss is "accelerating", with over a million species now threatened with extinction; the decline of the natural living world is "unprecedented" and largely a result of human actions.
  - Researchers at Columbia University report a new desalination method for hypersaline brines, known as "temperature swing solvent extraction (TSSE)", which is low-cost and efficient.
- 8 May – A British teenager, Isabelle Holdaway, 17, is reported to be the first patient to receive a genetically modified phage therapy to treat a drug-resistant infection.
- 11 May – Atmospheric CO_{2}, as measured by the Mauna Loa Observatory, Hawaii, reaches 415 parts per million (ppm), the highest level for 2.5 million years. During the late Pliocene, sea levels were up to 20 m higher, and the global climate was 3 °C hotter.
- 14 May
  - Computer security researchers at Graz University of Technology and Catholic University of Leuven, in a coordinated disclosure with Intel, announce the discovery of a group of Microarchitectural Data Sampling vulnerabilities, affecting millions of Intel microprocessors, which they named Fallout, RIDL (Rogue In-Flight Data Load) and ZombieLoad.
  - Researchers at Microsoft reported the BlueKeep security vulnerability (CVE-2019-0708) (noted as "critical" by Microsoft) that may affect nearly one million computers using older versions (Windows 8 and Windows 10 are not affected) of the Windows operating systems with a "wormable" Remote Desktop Services (RDS) Remote Code Execution (RCE) Remote Desktop Protocol (RDP) vulnerability. Microsoft recommends installing available update patches as soon as possible, and also recommends turning off Remote Desktop Services if they are not required.
  - Researchers at Macquarie University report that plastic pollution is harming the growth, photosynthesis and oxygen production of Prochlorococcus, the ocean's most abundant photosynthetic bacteria, responsible for 10% of oxygen breathed by humans.

15 May: Creation of a new synthetic form of viable life, a variant of the bacteria Escherichia coli, reported by researchers.

- 15 May
  - Researchers, in a milestone effort, report the creation of a new synthetic (possibly artificial) form of viable life, a variant of the bacteria Escherichia coli, by reducing the natural number of 64 codons in the bacterial genome to 59 codons instead, in order to encode 20 amino acids.
  - Researchers at University of Nebraska Medical Center describe the role of TGF-beta type II signaling receptor (TGFBR2) in osteoarthritis, which plays a key role in the progression of the disease by regulating joint development. They also identify a potential new drug that could treat it.
- 16 May
  - Astronomers report their first results about 486958 Arrokoth, the Kuiper Belt object in the outer Solar System that the New Horizons space probe flew by in January 2019.
  - Researchers from the University of Leeds report that nearly a quarter of the West Antarctic Ice Sheet is now unstable, with melting of the Pine Island and Thwaites glaciers now five times faster than 25 years previously.
- 19 May
  - Researchers at the University of Melbourne report an unusual slowdown in the growth of life expectancy in Australia, following 20 years of rapid increases.
  - Physicists report that decay processes of quasiparticles in certain strongly interacting medium systems may be stopped entirely, which may help make such particles basically immortal.
- 20 May
  - Lawyers in China report, in light of the purported creation by Chinese scientist He Jiankui of the first gene-edited humans (see Lulu and Nana controversy), the drafting of regulations that anyone manipulating the human genome by gene-editing techniques, like CRISPR, would be held responsible for any related adverse consequences.
  - The revision of the SI system of measurement adopted by the majority of countries in the world takes effect.

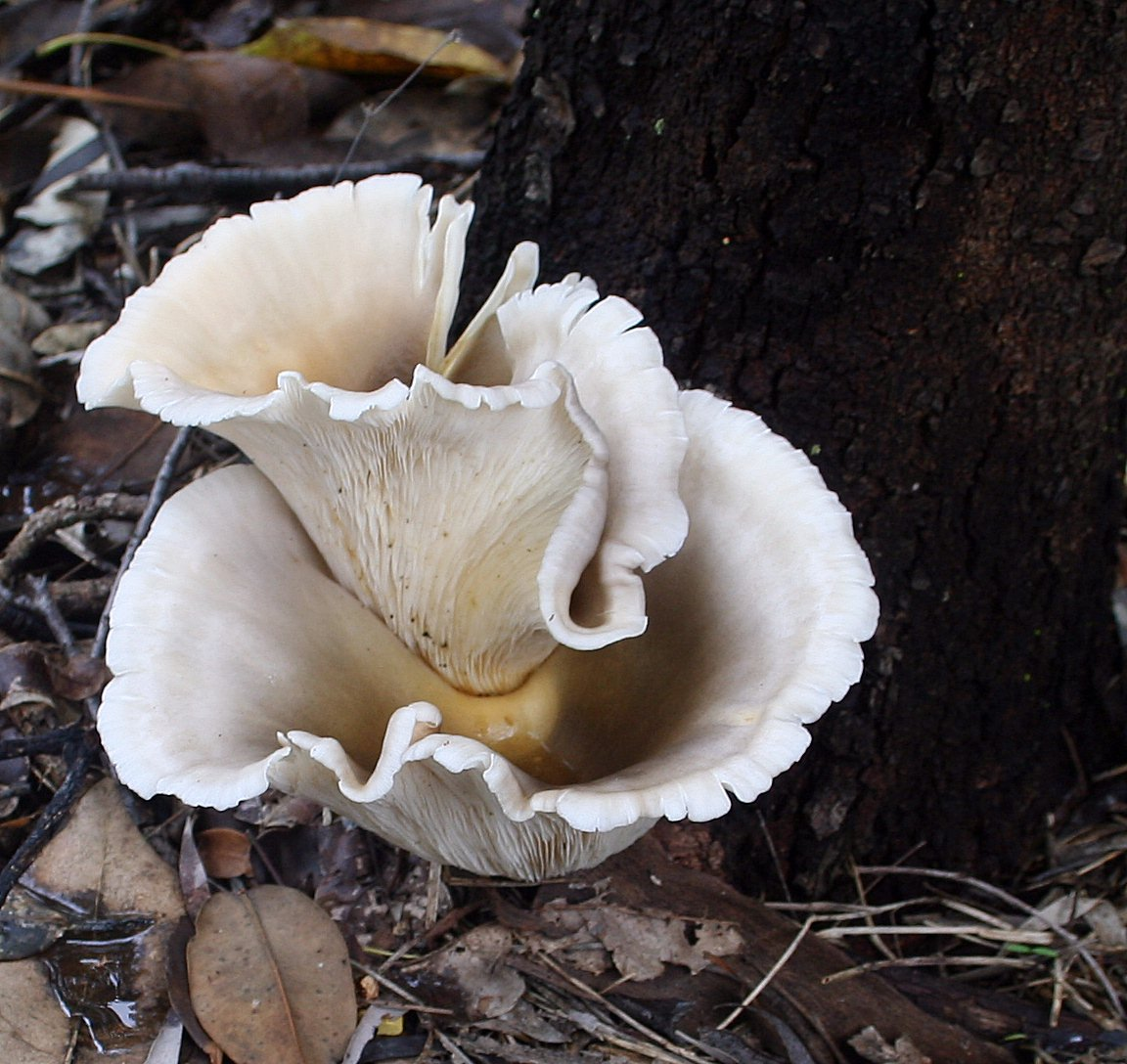
22 May: Fossilized fungus, Ourasphaira giraldae (not pictured), found that may have grown on land a billion years ago, well before plants were on land.

- 21 May – Researchers at McMaster University report the discovery of a new and more efficient method of storing vaccines in temperatures of up to 40 °C for weeks at a time.
- 22 May
  - Scientists report the discovery of a fossilized fungus, named Ourasphaira giraldae, in the Canadian Arctic, that may have grown on land a billion years ago, well before plants were living on land.
  - Superconductivity at very high pressure is observed at a temperature of −23 °C (−9 °F), a jump of about 50 degrees compared to the previous confirmed record, by researchers at the University of Chicago.
- 23 May
  - Researchers at the University of Southampton predict that the average (median) body mass of mammals will collectively reduce by 25 per cent over the next century, due to the impact of human activity.
  - Astronomers report the discovery of a very large amount of water in the northern polar region of the planet Mars.
- 27 May – The last male Sumatran rhinoceros in Malaysia is reported to have died, leaving only one female in the country.
- 28 May – A team from the University of Minnesota and University of Massachusetts exceed the Sabatier maximum, with a 10,000-fold increase in the rate of chemical reactions, using waves to create an oscillating catalyst.

=== June ===
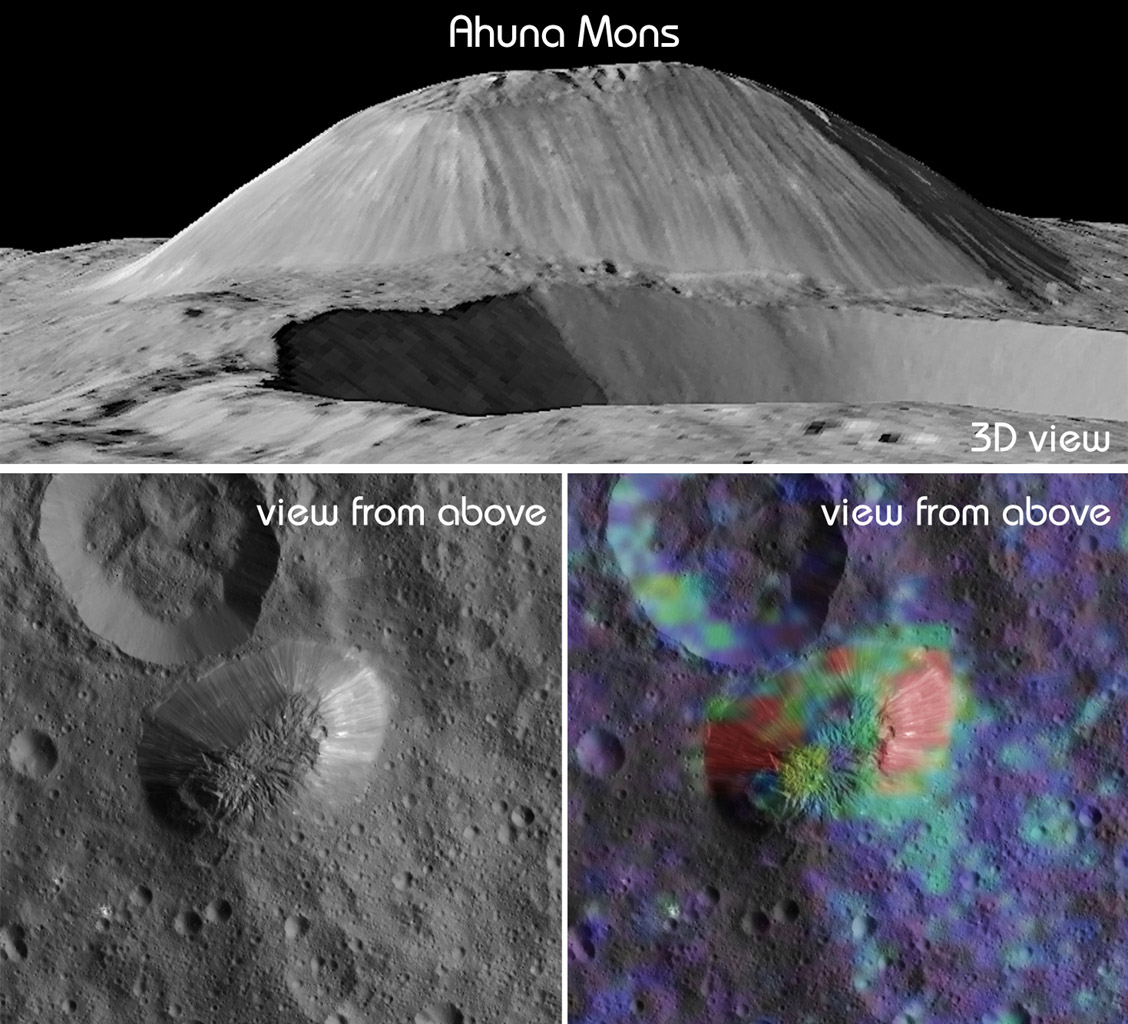
10 June: Scientists report that Ahuna Mons, a very high mountain on Ceres, may have been formed from a plume of mud ejected from deep inside the dwarf planet.

- June – Heuglin's gazelle rediscovered in Eritrea.
- 4 June – Astronomers report the discovery of a star, named ASASSN-V J213939.3-702817.4, non-variable earlier, observed to be associated with a very unusual, deep dimming event. The star, in the constellation Indus, is about 3,630 ly (1,110 pc) away.
- 5 June – Researchers using nuclear magnetic resonance show that initially correlated quantum spins can exhibit heat flow from a colder to a hotter system, demonstrating the reversal of the usual thermodynamic heat current due to quantum correlations.
- 6 June – The International Astronomical Union (I.A.U), in celebration of its hundredth anniversary, in a project called IAU100 NameExoWorlds, is reported to welcome countries of the world, to submit names for astronomical objects, particularly exoplanets and its host star, which would later be considered for official adoption by the organization.
- 10 June
  - Scientists report that Ahuna Mons, a very high dome-shaped mountain on the dwarf planet Ceres, may have been formed by a plume of mud ejected from deep within the planet.
  - A study by researchers from the Royal Botanic Gardens, Kew, identifies nearly 600 plants that have disappeared since the Industrial Revolution – more than twice the number of birds, mammals and amphibians combined – with extinctions now occurring 500 times faster than the natural background rate.
- 11 June
  - Astronomers report that the usual Hubble classification, particularly concerning spiral galaxies, may not be supported, and may need updating.
  - Researchers at the University of Colorado Boulder demonstrate "nanobio-hybrid" organisms capable of using airborne carbon dioxide and nitrogen to produce a variety of eco-friendly plastics and fuels.
- 12 June
  - The discovery of cold quasars is announced at the 234th meeting of the American Astronomical Society.
  - Astronomers report the discovery of two Earth-mass exoplanets orbiting Teegarden's Star within its habitable zone.
- 19 June – Researchers at Carnegie Mellon University demonstrate the first noninvasive mind-controlled robotic arm.
- 20 June – Researchers at Lancaster University describe a new electronic memory device that combines the properties of both DRAM and flash, while recording or deleting data using hundreds of times less energy.

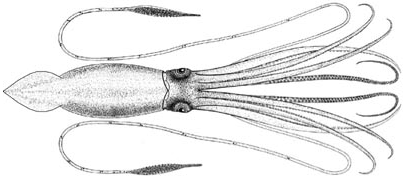
21 June: Scientists release 1st video appearance of a giant squid in United States waters.

- 21 June – Scientists release the video appearance, for the second time, and for the very first time in waters of the United States, of a giant squid in its deepwater habitat.
- 22 June – Scientists working with the Curiosity rover on the planet Mars report the detection of a significant amount of methane, the largest amount ever detected by the rover – 21 parts per billion units by volume (ppbv) (i.e., one ppbv means that if you take a volume of air on Mars, one billionth of the volume of air is methane). Methane is a possible indicator of life, but may also be produced geologically.
- 23 June – Researchers in Greece report for the first time, a single-step Laser texturing process for the fabrication of anti-reflective transparent surfaces based on biomimicry.
- 24 June – SpaceX successfully launches the Falcon Heavy for the 3rd time with the STP-2 mission. This is also the first Falcon Heavy mission contracted by the United States Government.
- 27 June – NASA's Dragonfly spacecraft is selected to become the fourth mission in the New Frontiers program. It will launch in 2026, arriving on the surface of Saturn's moon Titan in 2034.
- 28 June
  - Russian astronomers report the discovery of nine Fast Radio Burst (FRB) events (FRB 121029, FRB 131030, FRB 140212, FRB 141216, FRB 151125.1, FRB 151125.2, FRB 160206, FRB 161202, FRB 180321), which include one repeating FRB (FRB 151125, third one ever detected), from the direction of the M 31 (Andromeda Galaxy) and M 33 (Triangulum Galaxy) galaxies during the analysis of archive data (July 2012 to December 2018) from the BSA/LPI large phased array radio telescope at the Pushchino Radio Astronomy Observatory.
  - Astronomers report the detection of a star, named HD 139139 (EPIC 249706694), that dims in brightness in an apparent random, and currently unexplainable, way.
- 29 June – Scientists report that all 16 GB of Wikipedia have been encoded into synthetic DNA.

=== July ===
- 1 July
  - Astronomers report that ʻOumuamua, an interstellar object that passed through the Solar System in October 2017, was an object of a "purely natural origin", and not otherwise.

3 July: Substantial amounts of "lost tropical rainforest" can be restored, based on studies.

  - MRI scans were performed on individual atoms.
- 2 July
  - The European Centre for Medium-Range Weather Forecasts reports that the global average temperature for June 2019 was the highest on record for the month, at 0.1 °C higher than that of the previous warmest June, in 2016.
  - A total solar eclipse occurs, with totality visible in the South Pacific and South America.
  - Astronomers report that FRB 190523, a non-repeating Fast Radio Burst (FRB), has been discovered and, notably, localized to a few-arcsecond region containing a single massive galaxy at a redshift of 0.66, nearly 8 billion light-years away from Earth.
- 3 July
  - Scientists from the University of Bristol describe a new way to direct stem cells to heart tissue, using a designer adhesive protein.
  - Researchers identify more than a 1 million square kilometres (0.39 million square miles) of lost tropical rainforest across the Americas, Africa and Southeast Asia, with a high potential for restoration.
- 7 July – Researchers report receiving the first pictures from LightSail 2, a CubeSat developed by The Planetary Society, and launched into Earth orbit on 25 June 2019 by a Falcon Heavy rocket.

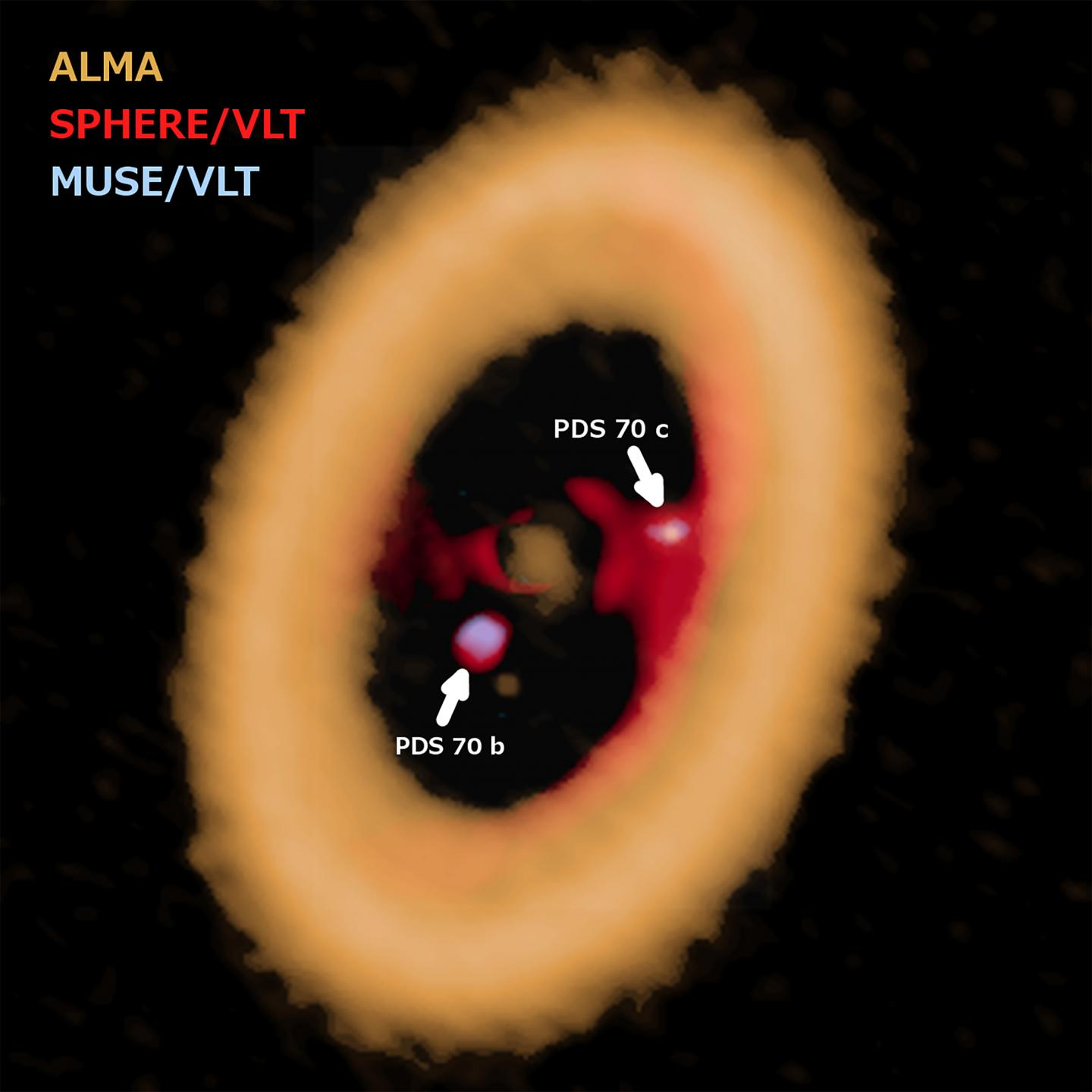
11 July: Detection, for the first time, of a moon-forming circumplanetary disk around a distant planet, PDS 70c.

- 8 July – Astronomers report that a new method to determine the Hubble constant, and resolve the discrepancy of earlier methods, has been proposed based on the mergers of pairs of neutron stars, following the detection of the neutron star merger of GW170817. Their measurement of the Hubble constant is 70.3+5.3
  −5.0 (km/s)/Mpc.
- 10 July – Anthropologists report the discovery of 210,000 year old remains of a Homo sapiens and 170,000 year old remains of a Neanderthal in Apidima Cave in southern Greece, over 150,000 years older than previous H. sapiens finds in Europe.
- 11 July
  - Astronomers report, for the first time, detection of a moon-forming circumplanetary disk around a distant planet, particularly PDS 70c.
  - Carnegie Mellon University reports an artificial intelligence program, developed in collaboration with Facebook AI, which is able to defeat leading professionals in six-player no-limit Texas hold'em poker.
- 12 July – Physicists report, for the first time, capturing an image of quantum entanglement.
- 13 July – The Russian/German Spektr-RG observatory is successfully launched into space, on a seven-year mission to study X-ray sources.
- 15 July
  - Astronomers report that non-repeating Fast Radio Bursts (FRB)s may not be one-off events, but actually FRB repeaters with repeat events that have gone undetected and, further, that FRBs may be formed by events that have not yet been seen or considered.
  - A paper is released in the journal Nature Astronomy in which researchers from Harvard University, the University of Edinburgh and NASA's Jet Propulsion Laboratory (JPL) detail how silica aerogel could be used to block radiation, obtain water and permit photosynthesis to occur to make Mars more hospitable for human survival.

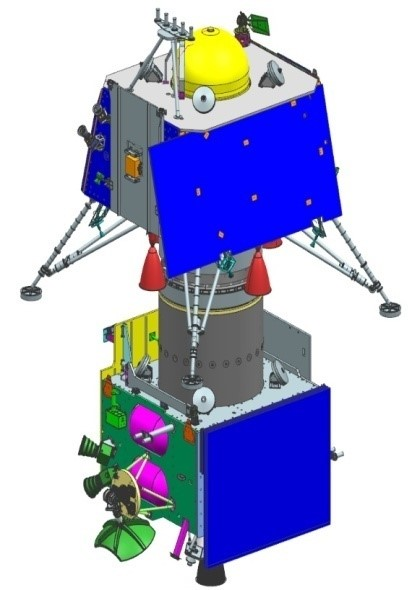
22 July: Chandrayaan-2 is launched, an ISRO lunar exploration mission that includes an orbiter, lander and rover.

- 16 July – Astronomers report the determination, based on a new method (Red Giant Stars method), of the Hubble Constant as 69.8 km s−1 Mpc−1, a value in the middle of two earlier values determined by two other methods: 67.4 (CMB Radiation method) and 74.0 (Cepheids method).
- 17 July – Astronomers rule out the chances of ~30 m (98 ft) asteroid 2006 QV89's hitting Earth in September 2019 by eliminating the possibility of its passing through an area where it would have to be if it were on an impacting orbit. Prior to this, the asteroid had been given a one-in-7,000 chance of hitting Earth.
- 22 July
  - The Indian Space Research Organisation (ISRO) launches Chandrayaan-2, its second lunar exploration mission, which includes an orbiter, lander and rover.
  - Biochemists and geochemist from Earth-Life Science Institute (ELSI), Tokyo and the National University of Malaysia, Bangi report the discovery of simple organic molecules (hydroxy acids) that can assemble themselves into possible protocells under conditions similar to those of the early Earth.
- 25 July – Astronomers report that 2019 OK, a previously undetected asteroid up to 130 metres (430 feet) across, passed within 72,000 kilometres (45,000 miles) of Earth on 25 July 2019 at 01:22 GMT.
- 30 July – Astronomers report evidence to support the hypothesis of an ancient ocean on the planet Mars that may have been formed by a possible mega-tsunami source resulting from a meteorite impact creating Lomonosov crater.
- 31 July
  - Astronomers report that GJ 357 d, a "Super-Earth" discovered by NASA's Transiting Exoplanet Survey Satellite (TESS), lies within the habitable zone of its parent star, 31 light years from Earth.
  - Astronomers report finding an A-type main-sequence star, S5-HVS1, traveling 1,755 km/s (3,930,000 mph), faster that any other star detected so far. The star is in the constellation Grus, the Crane, in the southern sky, and about 29,000 light-years from Earth, and may have been ejected from the Milky Way galaxy after interacting with Sagittarius A*, the supermassive black hole at the center of the galaxy.

=== August ===
- 1 August
  - Astronomers publish the most detailed ever measurements of the "warping" effect on the Milky Way's 3D structure, based on the distribution of more than 2,400 Cepheids, using the Optical Gravitational Lensing Experiment (OGLE).
  - Researchers at Carnegie Mellon University publish details of a new technique for 3D bioprinting of tissue scaffolds made from collagen, the major structural protein in the human body.
  - Danish polar research institution, Polar Portal, reports a spike in Greenland ice loss, with 11 billion tons melted in one day and 197 Gigatonnes during the month of July.

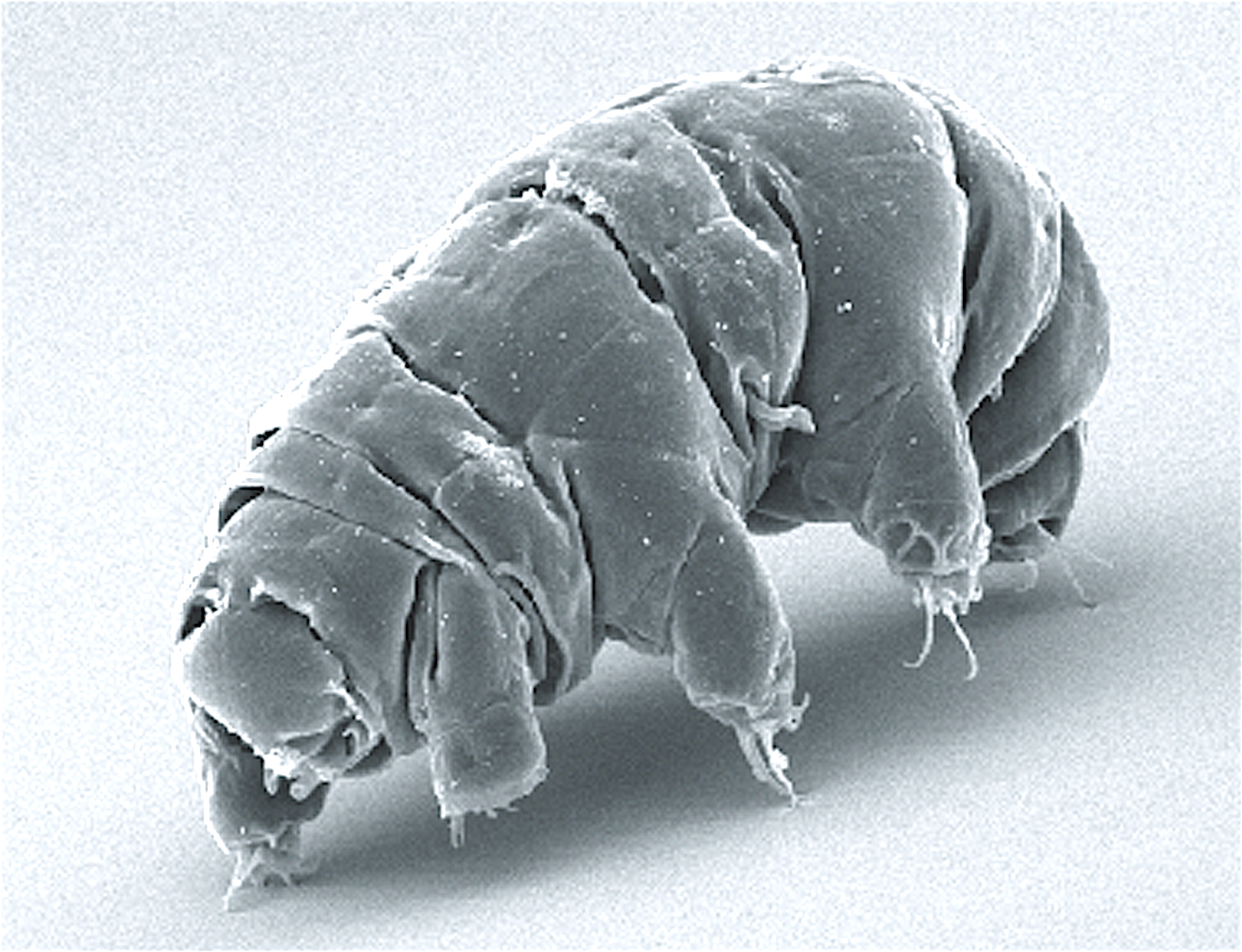
5 August: Tardigrades may have survived crash landing on the Moon.

- 5 August
  - Scientists report that a capsule containing tardigrades in cryptobiotic state (as well as a laser-etched copy of Wikipedia in glass) may have survived the April 2019 crash landing on the Moon of Beresheet, a failed Israeli lunar lander.
  - Engineers at the University of Buffalo reveal a new device able to cool parts of buildings by up to 11 °C (20 °F), without consuming electricity. The system uses an inexpensive polymer/aluminum film at the bottom of a solar "shelter", which absorbs heat from the air inside the box and transmits that energy back into outer space.
- 6 August – Scientists at the University of Leeds create a new form of gold just two atoms thick, measured at 0.47 nanometres. In addition to being the thinnest unsupported gold ever produced, it functions 10 times more efficiently as a catalytic substrate than larger gold nanoparticles.
- 7 August – Biologists report the discovery of the fossil remains of a first-of-its-kind extinct giant parrot named The Hercules parrot (or Heracles inexpectatus) in New Zealand. The parrot is thought to have stood up to 1 m (3 ft 3 in) tall and weighed approximately 7 kg (15 lb).
- 8 August
  - Astronomers report that the Magnetospheric Multiscale Mission (MMS) made the first high-resolution measurements of an interplanetary shock wave from the sun.
  - Researchers at Harvard report the creation of "cyborg organoids", which consist of 3D organoids grown from stem cells, with embedded sensors to measure activity in the developmental process.
- 9 August
  - Astronomers report the detection of eight very unusual repeating Fast Radio Burst (FRB) signals in outer space.
  - Scientists report the isolation and culture of Lokiarchaea, a microorganism that may help explain the emergence of complex eukarotic (nucleated) cells from simpler bacteria-like cells.

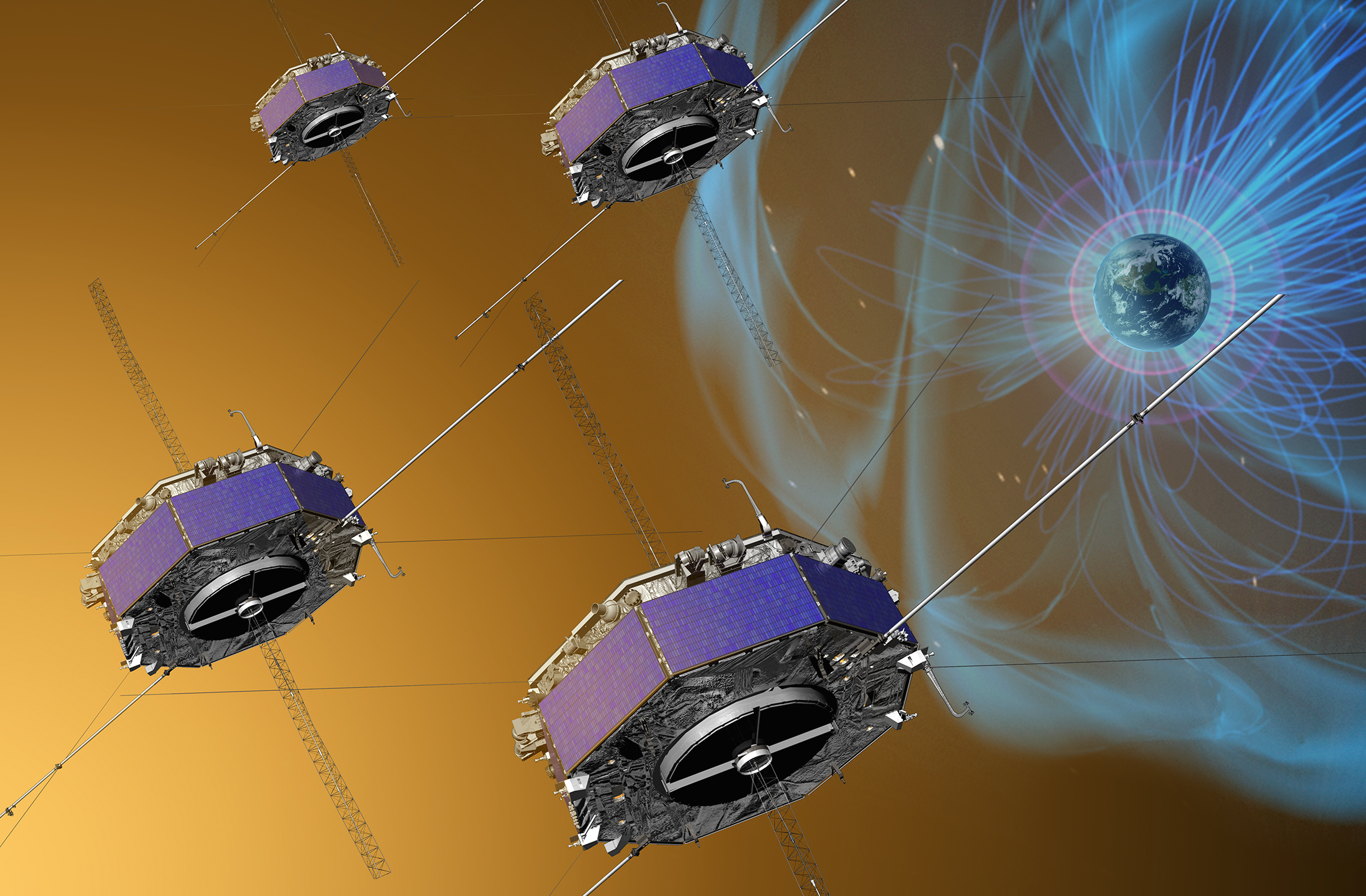
8 August: The Magnetospheric Multiscale Mission (MMS) makes the first high-resolution measurements of an interplanetary shock wave from the sun.

- 11 August
  - Researchers report that Windows 10 users may be at risk for "critical" system compromise due to design flaws of hardware device drivers from multiple providers.
  - Astronomers using the Keck Observatory report a sudden brightening of Sagittarius A*, which became 75 times brighter than usual, suggesting that the supermassive black hole may have encountered another object.
- 13 August – Computer experts report that the BlueKeep security vulnerability that potentially affects older unpatched Microsoft Windows versions via the program's Remote Desktop Protocol, allowing for the possibility of remote code execution, may now include related flaws, collectively named DejaBlue, affecting newer Windows versions (i.e., Windows 7 and all recent versions) as well.
- 14 August
  - Computer experts report a Microsoft security vulnerability, CVE-2019-1162, based on legacy code involving Microsoft CTF and ctfmon (ctfmon.exe), that affects all Windows versions from the older Windows XP version to the most recent Windows 10 versions; a patch to correct the flaw is currently available.
  - Astronomers report the best candidate yet for the collision, named S190814bv, of a black hole with a neutron star, based on the detection of gravitational wave signals.
  - The most accurate study of exoplanets to date, published by Penn State, estimates that one in six Sun-like stars contain planets of similar size and orbital period to Earth.
- 15 August
  - Chemists report the formation, for the first time, of an 18-atom cyclocarbon of pure carbon; such chemical structures may be useful as molecular-sized electronic components.
  - The National Oceanic and Atmospheric Administration (NOAA) reports that July 2019 was the hottest month on record globally, at 0.95 °C (1.71 °F) above the 20th century average.

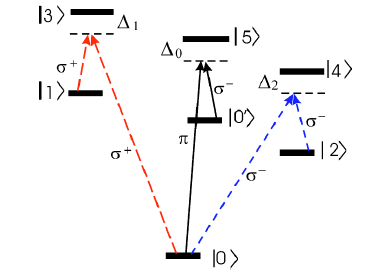
23 August: First teleportation of three-dimensional quantum states, or "qutrits"

- 19 August
  - NASA reports that the Europa Clipper mission to Europa, a moon of the planet Jupiter, has been confirmed.
  - The first computer chip to exceed one trillion transistors, known as the Wafer Scale Engine, is announced by Cerebras Systems in collaboration with Taiwan Semiconductor Manufacturing Company (TSMC).
- 22 August – Research by Norwegian scientists adds to a growing body of evidence that too much sitting is related to a higher risk of early death, and that even a small amount of regular activity can lengthen lifespan.
- 23 August
  - Austrian and Chinese scientists report the first teleportation of three-dimensional quantum states, or "qutrits", which are more complex than two-dimensional qubits.
  - NASA reports that the Deep Space Atomic Clock (DSAC), to be used for precise radio navigation in deep space, has been activated.
- 26 August – Astronomers report that newly discovered long-term pattern of absorbance and albedo changes in the atmosphere of the planet Venus are caused by "unknown absorbers", which may be microorganisms high up in the atmosphere of the planet.
- 28 August
  - Scientists report the discovery of a nearly intact skull, for the first time, and dated at 3.8 million years ago, of Australopithecus anamensis in Ethiopia.
  - Astronomers report the discovery, based on deep, irregularly shaped transits, of a second disrupted planetary object being ripped apart by its host star; in this instance, the host star is a white dwarf named ZTF J0139+5245; the first such similar host star discovered was WD 1145+017 in 2015.
  - Scientists report the discovery of a new distinctive light wave, named a Dyakonov–Voigt wave, that results from a particular manipulation of crystals, that was first suggested in equations developed by physicist James Clerk Maxwell in the middle 1800s.
- 29 August – Astronomers report that the exoplanet in the WASP-49 system might have a volcanically active exomoon.
- 30 August
  - In a study published in the journal PLOS Pathogens, researchers at Spain's Carlos III Health Institute note the discovery of the genetic mutuation TNPO3, known for causing muscular dystrophy, may also give protection against HIV.
  - Scientists in China report a way of regrowing the complex structure of tooth enamel, using calcium phosphate ion clusters as a precursor layer.

=== September ===
6 September: Exploit of wormable BlueKeep security vulnerability, affecting all unpatched Windows NT-based versions of Microsoft Windows, including Windows 2000 and Windows 7, has been released publicly.

- 2 September – Insilico Medicine reports the creation, via artificial intelligence, of six novel inhibitors of the DDR1 gene, a kinase target implicated in fibrosis and other diseases. The system, known as Generative Tensorial Reinforcement Learning (GENTRL), designed the new compounds in 21 days, with a lead candidate tested and showing positive results in mice.
- 5 September – Astronomers report that the observed dimmings of Tabby's Star may have been produced by fragments resulting from the disruption of an orphaned exomoon.
- 6 September
  - Computer experts announce that an exploit of the wormable BlueKeep security vulnerability, affecting all unpatched Windows NT-based versions of Microsoft Windows from Windows 2000 through Windows Server 2008 R2 and Windows 7, has now been released into the public realm.
  - Mathematicians report, after a 65-year search (since 1954), the solution to the last integer left below 100 (i.e., "42") expressed as the sum of three cubes.
  - A team of physicists report that the supposed discrepancy in the proton radius between electronic and muonic hydrogen does not exist, settling the proton radius puzzle.
- 7 September – The Indian Space Research Organisation (ISRO) loses contact with Chandrayaan-2, its second lunar probe, just moments before it was expected to land on the Moon's surface.
- 10 September – Scientists report the computerized determination, based on 260 CT scans, of a virtual skull shape of the last common human ancestor to modern humans, and suggests that the human ancestor arose through a merging of populations in East and South Africa, between 260,000 and 350,000 years ago.
- 11 September
  - Astronomers report the detection of water vapour in the atmosphere of the circumstellar habitable zone exoplanet K2-18b, which may be between 0 and 40 °C.
  - Researchers at the Swiss Federal Institute of Technology demonstrate the first artificial hand for amputees that merges user and robotic control, a concept in neuroprosthetics known as shared control.
  - Astronomers at the Minor Planet Center confirm the detection of comet C/2019 Q4 (Borisov), likely a second interstellar object, following the earlier discovery of ʻOumuamua.
  - Google reports the creation of a deep learning system, trained on 50,000 different diagnoses, able to detect 26 skin conditions as accurately as dermatologists.

16 September: The most massive neutron star ever discovered, with 2.17 solar masses placing it on the boundary of the theoretical maximum.

- 16 September
  - Biochemists report that "RNA-DNA chimeras" (complex mixtures of RNA molecules and DNA molecules) may be a more effective way of producing precursor life biochemicals, than the more linear approaches (with pure RNA and pure DNA molecules) used earlier.
  - Using CRISPR, researchers in the U.S. engineer a plasmid to remove an antibiotic resistance gene from the Enterococcus faecalis bacterium.
  - Astronomers using the Green Bank Telescope identify a rapidly rotating millisecond pulsar, called J0740+6620, as the most massive neutron star ever observed, with 2.17 solar masses in a sphere only 30 kilometers across.
  - Scientists at the Mayo Clinic report the first successful use of senolytics, a new class of drug with potential anti-aging benefits, to remove senescent cells from human patients with a kidney disease.
  - In a study published in PNAS, researchers at MIT detail a new emission free method of cement production, a major contributor to climate change.
- 17 September – A small clinical trial, announced by U.S. company NeuroEM Therapeutics, shows reversal of cognitive impairment in Alzheimer's disease patients after just two months of treatment using a wearable head device. Electromagnetic waves emitted by the device appear to penetrate the brain to break up amyloid-beta and tau deposits.
- 19 September – Researchers report on the facial appearance of Denisovans, an extinct group of archaic humans in the genus Homo, based on genetic information.
- 20 September – Scientists report that the InSight lander on the planet Mars uncovered unexplained magnetic pulses, and magnetic oscillations may be consistent with a planet-wide reservoir of liquid water deep underground.

25 September: Largest iceberg in 50 years breaks off from the Amery Ice Shelf in Antarctica.

- 25 September
  - The Intergovernmental Panel on Climate Change (IPCC) releases its Special Report on the Ocean and Cryosphere in a Changing Climate. This includes a revised projection for sea level rise, upwards by 10 cm to 1.1 metres by 2100.
  - Canadian company Deep Genomics announces that its AI-based drug discovery platform has identified a target and drug candidate for Wilson's disease. The candidate, DG12P1, is designed to correct the exon-skipping effect of Met645Arg, a genetic mutation affecting the ATP7B copper-binding protein.
  - Engineers at Duke University report the use of machine learning to rapidly design dielectric (non-metal) metamaterials that absorb and emit specific frequencies of terahertz radiation.
  - The Amery Ice Shelf in Antarctica produces its largest iceberg in more than 50 years, with a chunk called D28 being calved off that is 1,636 km^{2} in area and weighs an estimated 315 billion tonnes.
- 27 September – Astronomers report, for the first time, the release of cyanide gas and dust from an interstellar object, particularly from the interstellar comet 2I/Borisov.
- 30 September – By combining doses of lithium, trametinib and rapamycin into a single treatment, researchers extend the lifespan of fruit flies (Drosophila) by 48%.

=== October ===
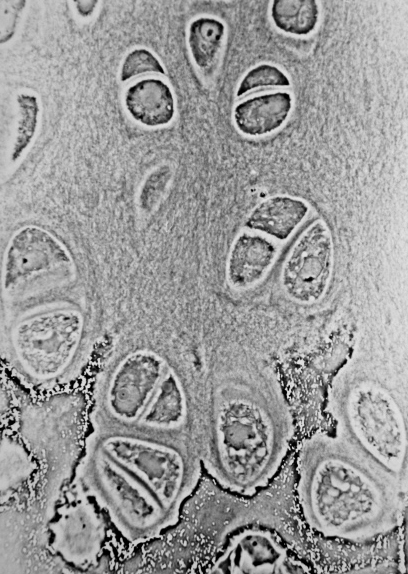
8 October: Researchers find human cartilage repair mechanism which may allow entire limbs to regenerate.

- 1 October
  - Scientists at the Deep Carbon Observatory quantify the amount of carbon held by the Earth, finding that 1.85∗10^{18} tonnes is present, the vast majority below ground.
  - Scientists at the University of California, San Diego describe how a protein named Dsup (Damage suppression protein) binds to chromatin, which protects the cells of tardigrades and may explain the animals' tremendous resilience.
  - Physicists report a way of determining the state of Schrödinger's cat before observing it.
- 2 October – Scientists reveal the photo carrier dynamics in heterojunction phototransistors and show how molecular packing can impact on photoresponse. The study could lead to new schemes to engineer efficient photo carrier transport in general.
- 4 October – Scientists use a new parallelised technique, known as femtosecond projection TPL (FP-TPL), to 3D print nanoscale structures up to 1,000 times faster than conventional two-photon lithography (TPL).
- 7 October
  - NASA reports evidence, uncovered by the Curiosity rover on Mount Sharp, of a 150 km (93 mi) wide ancient basin in Gale crater that once may have contained a salty lake.
  - 20 new moons of Saturn are discovered by Scott S. Sheppard and his team at the Carnegie Institution for Science, taking the planet's total known number to 82, surpassing Jupiter.
  - Researchers genetically engineer Escherichia coli that can manufacture large amounts of psilocybin, which is in clinical trials for treating depression and other brain diseases.
- 8 October – Researchers at Duke University Health System identify a mechanism for cartilage repair in humans, which could allow joints and possibly entire limbs to regenerate.
- 15 October – OpenAI demonstrates a pair of neural networks trained to solve a Rubik's Cube with a highly dexterous, human-like robotic hand.
- 16 October – Researchers at Harvard Medical School identify a link between neural activity and human longevity. Neural excitation is linked to shorter life, while suppression of overactivity appears to extend lifespan.
- 17 October – Northwestern University researchers unveil a new 3D printer known as HARP (high-area rapid printing), which can produce an object the size of an adult human within two hours, without sacrificing quality or resolution.

23 October: Google notes its 53-qubit 'Sycamore' processor has achieved quantum supremacy.

- 18 October
  - Researchers at the University of California, Santa Cruz, describe the use of nanoscale optical probes to monitor neural activity, with potential to greatly increase the scale and bandwidth available compared to microelectrode arrays.
  - A new stable form of plutonium, which may be a transient phase in radioactive waste repositories, is discovered by scientists using the European Synchrotron in Grenoble, France.

- 21 October
  - In a study, published in the journal Nature, researchers at the Broad Institute describe a new method of genetic engineering superior to previous methods like CRISPR they call "prime editing".
  - Researchers report that the Cretaceous Chicxulub asteroid impact that resulted in the extinction of non-avian dinosaurs 66 million years ago, also rapidly acidified the oceans producing ecological collapse and long-lasting effects on the climate, and was a key reason for end-Cretaceous mass extinction.
- 22 October – Scientists publish a paper claiming support for their controversial and disputed Younger Dryas impact hypothesis that the extinction of ice-age animals may have been caused by a disintegrating asteroid or comet impact and/or airburst about 12,800 years ago.
- 23 October – Google announces that its 53-qubit 'Sycamore' processor has achieved quantum supremacy, performing a specific task in 200 seconds that would take the world's best supercomputers 10,000 years to complete. However, the claim is disputed by some IBM researchers.
- 25 October – A new carbon capture system is described by MIT, which can work on the gas at almost any concentration, using electrodes combined with carbon nanotubes.

26 October: Botswana in south central Africa found to be the birthplace of all modern humans 200,000 years ago, based on genetic studies.

- 28 October
  - A study published in Nature identifies Botswana as the birthplace of anatomically modern humans, based on genetic studies, around 200,000 BCE.
  - Astronomers observe the large asteroid Hygiea in higher resolution than ever before, revealing it to be spherical and a likely dwarf planet candidate; possibly the smallest in the Solar System.
  - Researchers report that the interstellar comet 2I/Borisov is outgassing water, and in a manner similar to the outgassing of water in a typical comet in the Solar System.
  - Scientists report that terrestrial lifeforms, including extreme forms of archaea microorganisms, were not found to exist in very hot, acidic and salty conditions present in some areas of Earth, including in the Danakil Depression of Ethiopia.
- 29 October – A study in Nature concludes that rising sea levels will threaten 300 million people by 2050, more than triple previous estimates. The upward revision is based on the use of a multilayer perceptron, a class of artificial neural network, which analysed topographical maps in greater detail than before and provided more accurate land elevations.
- 30 October – A large-scale study by researchers in Germany finds that insect populations declined by one-third between 2008 and 2017.
- 31 October – Researchers at the KTH Royal Institute of Technology, Sweden, develop a new film that is applied to solar cells, which combines nanocrystals and microlenses to capture infrared light. This can increase the solar energy conversion efficiency by 10 percent or more.

=== November ===
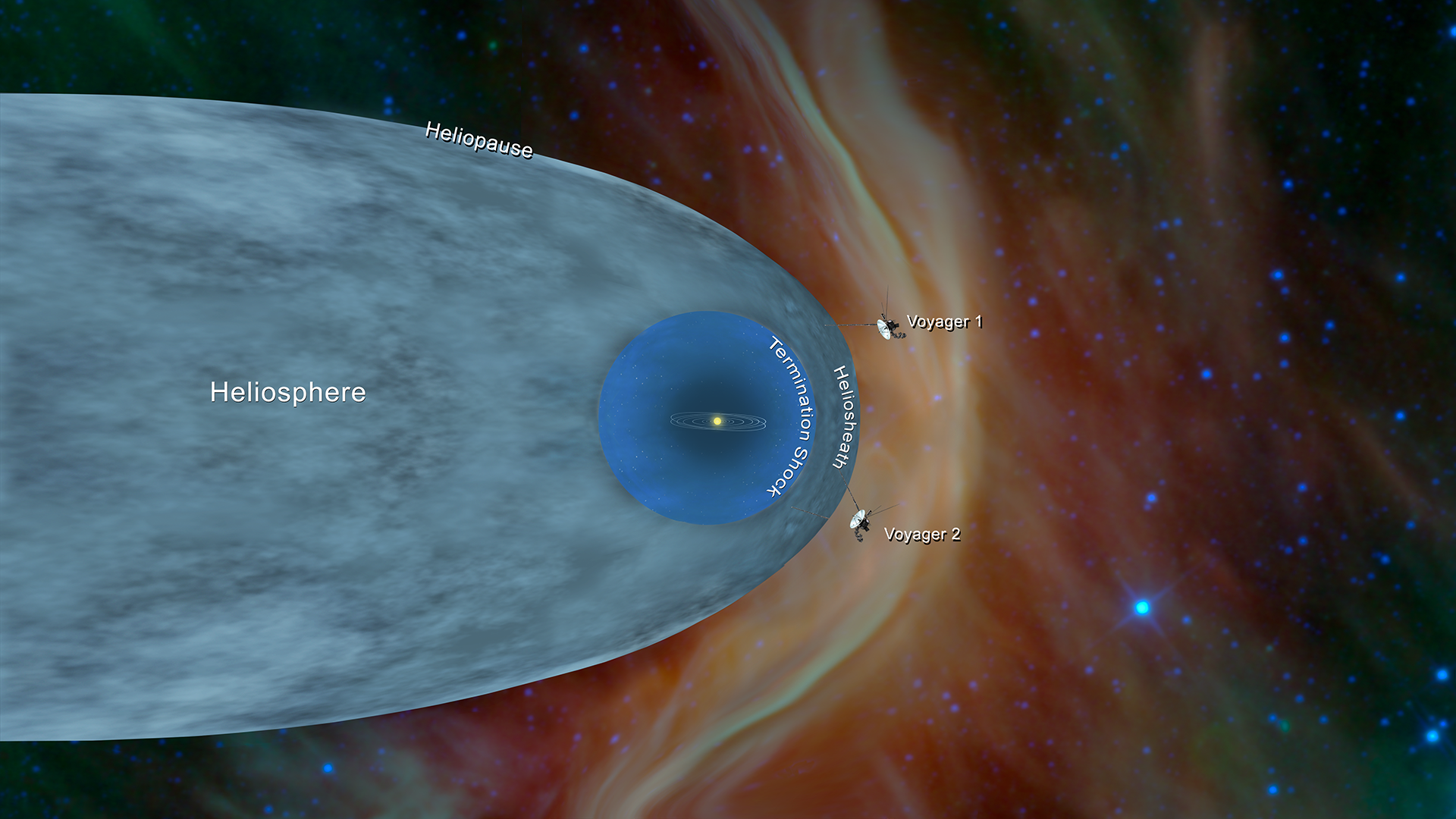
4 November: Scientists officially confirm that the Voyager 2 space probe left the Solar System and entered interstellar space on 5 November 2018.

- 1 November – Researchers at Rensselaer Polytechnic Institute demonstrate a way to 3D print living skin, complete with blood vessels, which could be used for more natural and accurate grafts.
- 4 November – Scientists confirm that, on 5 November 2018, the Voyager 2 probe had officially reached the interstellar medium (ISM), a region of outer space beyond the influence of the Solar System, and has now joined the Voyager 1 probe which had reached the ISM earlier in 2012.
- 5 November – 11,000 scientists from around the world publish a study in the journal BioScience, warning "clearly and unequivocally that planet Earth is facing a climate emergency."
- 6 November – Scientists at the University of Rochester demonstrate a new technique for creating superhydrophobic metals that float on water, using femtosecond laser bursts to "etch" the surfaces and trap air.
- 8 November
  - Microsoft confirms a potentially wormable BlueKeep security vulnerability attack, and urges users to immediately patch their Microsoft Windows computer systems.
  - Computer experts at Kaspersky Lab report the detection of a very advanced and insidious backdoor malware APT named Titanium, that was developed by PLATINUM, a cybercrime collective.
- 12 November – 486958 Arrokoth, a trans-Neptunian object previously nicknamed "Ultima Thule" and visited by the New Horizons spacecraft, receives its official name during a ceremony at the NASA Headquarters.

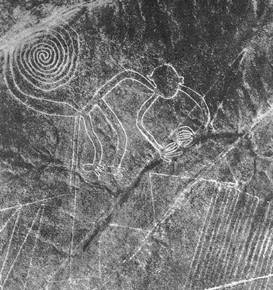
15 November: 143 new Nazca geoglyphs are reported by researchers.

- 13 November
  - Jim Peebles, awarded the 2019 Nobel Prize in Physics for his theoretical discoveries in physical cosmology. notes, in his award presentation, that he does not support the Big Bang Theory, due to the lack of concrete supporting evidence, and states, "It's very unfortunate that one thinks of the beginning whereas in fact, we have no good theory of such a thing as the beginning."
  - Researchers report that astronauts experienced serious blood flow and clot problems while on board the International Space Station, based on a six-month study of 11 healthy astronauts. The results may influence long-term spaceflight, including a mission to the planet Mars, according to the researchers.
  - Scientists in Japan use single-cell RNA analysis to find that supercentenarians have an excess of cytotoxic CD4 T-cells, a type of immune cell.
- 15 November – The discovery and interpretation of 143 new Nazca geoglyphs is announced by researchers from Yamagata University.
- 18 November
  - Internal-wave cooling of threatened coral reefs quantified across the Pacific Ocean by an international collaboration led by The Hong Kong University of Science and Technology is published in Nature Geoscience
  - Titan, the largest moon of Saturn, is fully mapped for the first time, using data from NASA's Cassini mission.
  - Scientists report detecting, for the first time, sugar molecules, including ribose, in meteorites, suggesting that chemical processes on asteroids can produce some fundamentally essential bio-ingredients important to life, and supporting the notion of an RNA world prior to a DNA-based origin of life on Earth, and possibly, as well, the notion of panspermia.
  - Researchers at the University of Notre Dame develop a new method for lifelong learning in artificial neural networks, which entails the use of a ferroelectric ternary content-addressable memory component. Their study, featured in Nature Electronics, aims to replicate the human brain's ability to learn from only a few examples, adapting to new tasks based on past experiences.
- 20 November
  - Astronomers report a notable gamma ray burst explosion, named GRB 190114C, initially detected in January 2019, that, so far, has been determined to have had the highest energy, 1 Tera electron volts (Tev), ever observed for such a cosmic event.
  - A study shows that the consensus among climate change scientists has grown to 100%, based on a review of 11,602 peer-reviewed articles published in the first seven months of 2019.

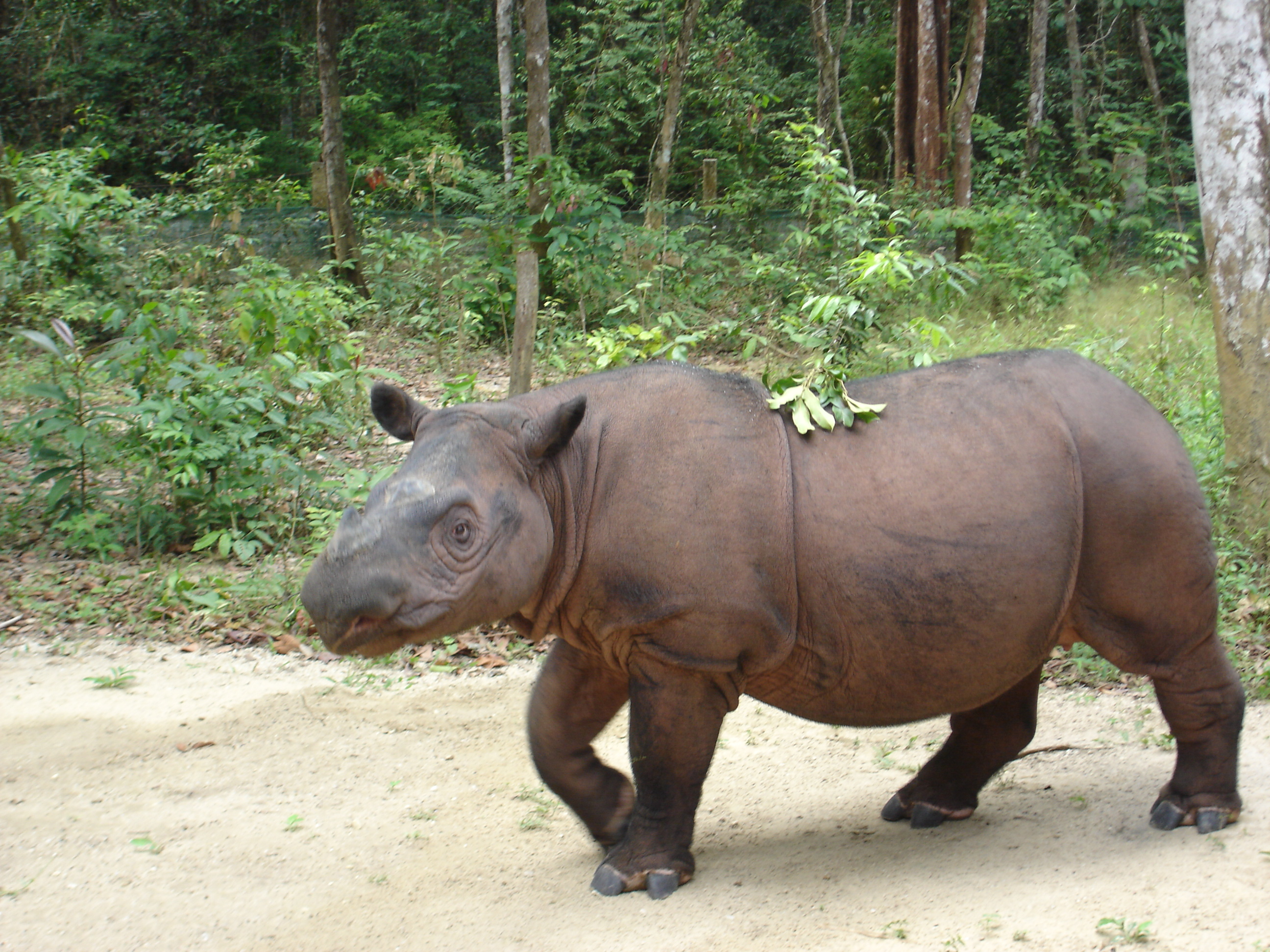
23 November: Last known Sumatran rhinoceros in Malaysia passes on.

- 23 November – The last known Sumatran rhinoceros in Malaysia passes on.
- 25 November
  - IPv4 address exhaustion: The RIPE NCC, which is the official regional Internet registry (RIR) for Europe, officially announces that it has run out of IPv4 Addresses.
  - The World Meteorological Organization reports that levels of heat-trapping greenhouse gases in the atmosphere reached another new record high of 407.8 parts per million in 2018, with "no sign of a slowdown, let alone a decline."
- 26 November
  - Astronomers from Yale University report that the recently detected interstellar comet 2I/Borisov (including coma and tail), is "14 times the size of Earth", presented an image comparing the comet size with the size of planet Earth [...] and stated, "It's humbling to realize how small Earth is next to this visitor from another solar system."
  - Researchers report, based on an international study of 27 countries, that caring for families is the main motivator for people worldwide.
- 27 November
  - Researchers report the discovery of Caveasphaera. a multicellular organism found in 609-million-year-old rocks, that is not easily defined as an animal or non-animal, which may be related to one of the earliest instances of animal evolution.
  - Scientists at the University of Exeter report that more than half of nine climate change tipping points identified a decade ago are now "active".
  - Chinese astronomers report the discovery of LB-1, the name of a galactic B-type star, as well as the name of a very closely associated over-massive stellar-mass black hole, at least 7,000 light-years (2,100 pc) from Earth. The black hole is, at nearly 70 solar masses, over twice the mass as the maximum predicted by most current theories of stellar evolution.

=== December ===
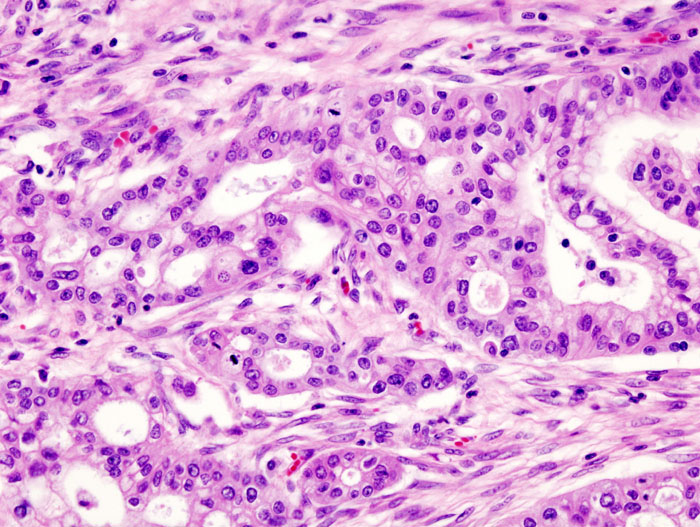
2 December: Molecule, PJ34, found that promotes the self-destruction of up to 90% of the pancreatic cancer cells in laboratory mouse studies.

- 2 December
  - Researchers at the U.S. Department of Energy demonstrate X-ray Laser-Enhanced Attosecond Pulse generation (XLEAP), a new method for observing the movements of electrons, using lasers just 280 attoseconds long.
  - Researchers from Tel Aviv University describe how a molecule known as PJ34 triggers the self-destruction of pancreatic cancer cells, which were reduced by up to 90% in mouse models.
- 3 December – Researchers from the University of Bath report the creation of artificial neurons that reproduce the electrical properties of biological neurons onto semiconductor chips.
- 4 December – Astronomers publish the first evidence of a giant planet orbiting a white dwarf, WDJ0914+1914, suggesting that planets in the Solar System may survive the death of the Sun in the distant future.
- 5 December – Researchers at the California Academy of Sciences report the discovery of 71 new plant and animal species, which includes 17 fish, 15 geckos, 8 flower plants, 6 sea slugs, 5 arachnids, 4 eels, 3 ants, 3 skinks, 2 skates, 2 wasps, 2 mosses, 2 corals and 2 lizards.
- 6 December – New calculations show that hollow spherical bubbles containing positronium gas are stable in liquid helium and could therefore serve as the source of positronium Bose-Einstein condensates for gamma-ray lasers, which could be used for medical imaging, spacecraft propulsion, and cancer treatment. Work to realize such bubbles is ongoing and near term results might have applications in quantum computing.
- 7 December – Didier Queloz, winner of the 2019 Nobel Prize in Physics, takes issue with those who are not supportive of helping to improve climate change, stating, "I think this is just irresponsible, because the stars are so far away I think we should not have any serious hope to escape the Earth [...] Also keep in mind that we are a species that has evolved and developed for this planet. We're not built to survive on any other planet than this one [...] We'd better spend our time and energy trying to fix it."
- 8 December – Astronomers report that the star Betelgeuse has significantly "fainted" in visibility and, possibly as a result, may suggest the star to be in the last stages of its evolution, and may be expected to explode as a supernova within the next 100,000 years, much sooner than thought previously.

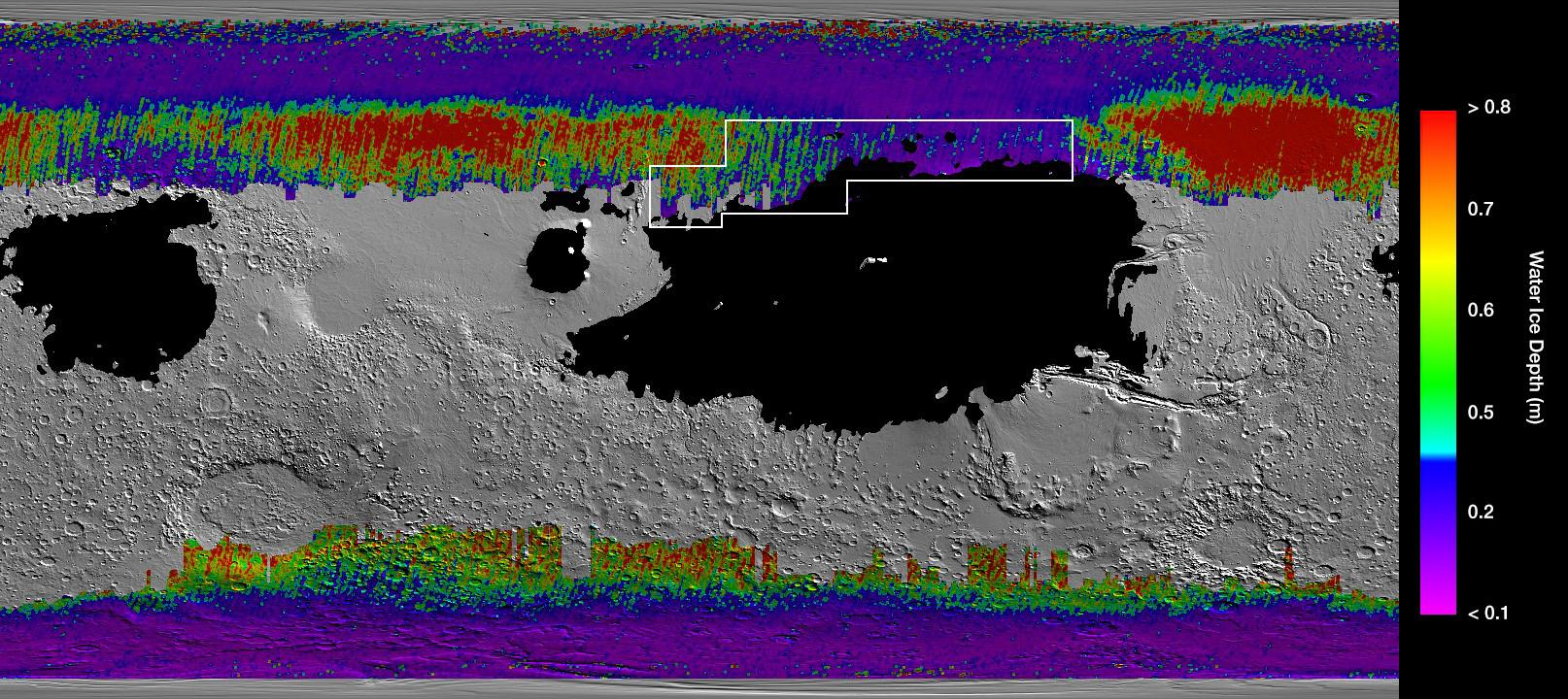
10 December: Substantial amounts of water ice detected just below the surface in certain areas on the planet Mars.

- 9 December
  - Researchers at EPFL discover that the viscosity of solutions of electrically charged polymers dissolved in water is influenced by a quantum effect. This tiny quantum effect influences the way water molecules interact with one another.
  - Researchers publish a study, "Ultrafast stimulated emission microscopy of single nanocrystals," in which they report on a technique for studying femtosecond events in non-fluorescent, nano-scale objects.
  - Researchers report quantum states being achieved in materials such as silicon carbide and components such as diodes used in ordinary electronics.
  - Scientists in China create pigs with monkey DNA; thus creating an animal hybrid with genetic material from two different species.
  - Intel reveals a first-of-its-kind cryogenic control chip – code-named "Horse Ridge" – for control of multiple quantum bits (qubits) and scaling of larger quantum computer systems.
  - Researchers develop a self-cleaning mechanism for solar panels, which can remove particles on its surface more effectively than methods used previously. Due to wet-chemically etched nanowires and a hydrophobic coating on the surface, water droplets can remove 98% of dust particles.
- 10 December
  - Astronomers report studies that question the validity of an essential assumption supporting the existence of dark energy, suggesting that dark energy may not actually exist. Lead researcher of the new studies, Young-Wook Lee of Yonsei University, said, "Quoting Carl Sagan, extraordinary claims require extraordinary evidence, but I am not sure we have such extraordinary evidence for dark energy. Our result illustrates that dark energy from SN cosmology, which led to the 2011 Nobel Prize in Physics, might be an artifact of a fragile and false assumption."
  - NASA scientists report that substantial amounts of "water ice" may be readily available just below the surface on the planet Mars, in some particularly well mapped areas (image).
  - Ford Motor Company, in a joint research project with Microsoft, reveals a "quantum-inspired" algorithm able to cut traffic by 73% and shorten commuting times by 8% in a simulation of 5,000 cars.
- 11 December
  - Scientists report the discovery of cave art in central Indonesia that is estimated to be at least 43,900 years old, and noted that the finding was "the oldest pictorial record of storytelling and the earliest figurative artwork in the world".
  - Researchers find evidence that the carbon dioxide concentration in the oceans rose before the asteroid impact that caused the extinction of non-avian dinosaurs. This was likely caused by long-term volcanic eruptions from the Deccan Traps and acidified the oceans already before the asteroid impact. Their results might inform preparations for consequences of contemporary human-caused climate change in the Earth system and were made possible by a new method for analyzing the calcium isotope composition of fossilized sea shells.
- 13 December – The Japanese government approves construction of the Hyper-Kamiokande, the largest neutrino detector in history.
- 16 December – Scientists report that a lamella-like thin-film transistor composed of metal oxide semiconductors and organic polymer can be fabricated at low temperatures from solutions and operate under severe stress conditions. The study could provide a low-cost way for a range applications for large-area flexible electronics.
- 18 December
  - The CHEOPS space telescope, whose mission is to study the formation of extrasolar planets and determine their precise radius, likely density and internal structure, is launched.
  - Scientists report that Homo erectus, a species of extinct archaic humans, may have survived to nearly 100,000 years ago, much longer than thought previously.
- 19 December – The AAAS journal Science reports that the "2019 Breakthrough of the Year" is the image of a supermassive black hole taken by the Event Horizon Telescope. The best science findings of 2019 are also reported in other listings by Boston University, Business Insider and The New York Times.
- 20 December – The US government authorises, for the first time, the use of federal funds to research geoengineering.
- 26 December – A partial solar eclipse occurs.
- 28 December – NASA reports that astronaut Christina Koch has now spent 289 days on the International Space Station, more time in space than any other female astronaut, breaking the previous record of retired astronaut Peggy Whitson.
- 30 December – Chinese authorities announce that He Jiankui, the scientist who claimed to have created the world's first genetically edited human babies, has been sentenced to three years in prison and fined 3 million yuan (US$430,000) for his genetic research efforts.

== Awards ==
- Queen Elizabeth Prize for Engineering – Bradford Parkinson, James Spilker, Hugo Fruehauf and Richard Schwartz
- Abel Prize – Karen Uhlenbeck
- The Nobel Prize in Medicine is awarded to William G. Kaelin Jr., Peter J. Ratcliffe and Gregg L. Semenza for their work on the regulation of oxygen at the cellular level.
- The Nobel Prize in Physics is awarded to James Peebles, Michel Mayor and Didier Queloz for their discoveries about the cosmos.
- The Nobel Prize in Chemistry is awarded to John B. Goodenough, M. Stanley Whittingham and Akira Yoshino for their work on lithium batteries.

== Deaths ==
- 11 January – Michael Atiyah, British-Lebanese mathematician and Fields medalist (b. 1929)
- 6 February – Manfred Eigen, German chemist and Nobel laureate (b. 1927)
- 14 February – Simon P. Norton, English mathematician, co-discoverer of 'monstrous moonshine' (b. 1952)
- 18 February – Wallace Smith Broecker, American geophysicist, coined the term "global warming" (b. 1931)
- 1 March – Zhores Alferov, Soviet-Russian physicist and Nobel laureate (b. 1930)
- 20 March
  - Georg Kreutzberg, German neurobiologist (b. 1934)
  - Noel Hush, Australian chemist (b. 1924)
- 21 March – Roger Moore, American computer scientist (b. 1939)
- 28 March – Koji Nakanishi, Japanese chemist (b. 1925)
- 30 March – John Wilson Moore, American biophysicist (b. 1920)
- 5 April – Sydney Brenner, South African molecular biologist and Nobel laureate (b. 1927)
- 6 April – David J. Thouless, British physicist and Nobel laureate (b. 1934)
- 13 April – Paul Greengard, American neuroscientist and Nobel laureate (b. 1925)
- 15 April – Winston L. Shelton, American inventor (b. 1922)
- 2 May – Li Xintian, Chinese psychologist (b. 1924)
- 3 May – Goro Shimura, Japanese mathematician (b. 1930)
- 6 May – George Zimmerman, American physicist (b. 1935)
- 8 May – Robert McEliece, American mathematician and engineer (b. 1942)
- 9 May – Zhan Wenshan, Chinese physicist (b. 1941)
- 10 May – Geneviève Raugel, French mathematician (b. 1951)
- 13 May – Lo Tung-bin, Taiwanese biochemist (b. 1927)
- 14 May – Michael Rossmann, American physicist and microbiologist (b. 1930)
- 15 May – Charles Kittel, American physicist (b. 1916)
- 18 May – Mario Baudoin, Bolivian biologist (b. 1942)
- 24 May – Murray Gell-Mann, American physicist and Nobel laureate (b. 1929)
- 25 May – Margaret-Ann Armour, Canadian chemist (b. 1939)
- 27 May
  - Laurie Hendren, Canadian computer scientist (b. 1958)
  - Aharon Razin, Israeli biochemist (b. 1935)
- 28 May
  - Li Hengde, Chinese material scientist (b. 1921)
  - Wlodzimierz Ptak, Polish immunologist and microbiologist (b. 1928)
- 1 June
  - Harry Triandis, American psychologist (b. 1926)
  - Fons van de Vijver, Dutch psychologist (b. 1952)
- 2 June – Henry Lynch, American physician (b. 1928)
- 3 June – Tang Dingyuan, Chinese physicist (b. 1920)
- 4 June – Teruko Ishizaka, Japanese immunologist (b. 1926)
- 12 June – Wilbert McKeachie, American psychologist (b. 1921)
- 13 June – Heinrich Reichert, Swiss neurobiologist (b. 1949)
- 14 June
  - George Felton, British computer scientist (b. 1921)
  - James Wyngaarden, American physician (b. 1924)
- 16 June
  - Frederick Andermann, Canadian neurologist (b. 1930)
  - Feng Chuanhan, Chinese osteologist (b. 1914)
  - Francine Shapiro, American psychologist (b. 1948)
- 17 June
  - Kung Hsiang-fu, Chinese molecular biologist (b. 1942)
  - Clemens Roothaan, Dutch physicist and chemist (b. 1918)
- 20 June – Jean-Marie Hullot, French computer scientist (b. 1954)
- 22 June – Robert Levine, American psychologist (b. 1945)
- 23 June – George Rozenkranz, Mexican chemist (b. 1916)
- 29 June – Dieter Enders, German chemist (b. 1946)
- 30 June – Mitchell Feigenbaum, American physicist (b. 1944)
- 2 July – Suzanne Eaton, American biologist (b. 1959)
- 3 July – Arseny Mironov, Russian aeronautical engineer (b. 1917)
- 6 July – Calvin Quate, American engineer (b. 1923)
- 10 July
  - Karen Hitchcock, American biologist (b. 1943)
  - Gerald Weismann, American physician (b. 1930)
- 12 July
  - Fernando J. Corbató, American computer scientist (b. 1926)
  - Claudio Naranjo, Chilean psychiatrist (b. 1932)
  - Richard M. Thorne, American physicist (b. 1942)
- 13 July – Harlan Lane, American psychologist (b. 1936)
- 14 July
  - Rahul Desikan, American neuroscientist (b. 1978)
  - Hoàng Tụy, Vietnamese mathematician (b. 1927)
  - Arvind Varma, American chemical engineer (b. 1947)
- 15 July
  - Rex Richards, British chemist (b. 1922)
  - Thorsteinn Sigfusson, Icelandic physicist (b. 1954)
- 16 July – Judit Bar-Ilan, Israeli computer scientist (b. 1958)
- 18 July – Kurt Julius Isselbacher, American physician (b. 1925)
- 19 July
  - Godfried Toussaint, Canadian computer scientist (b. 1944)
  - Patrick Winston, American computer scientist (b. 1943)
- 20 July – Liane Russell, American geneticist (b. 1923)
- 22 July – Christopher C. Kraft Jr., American aerospace engineer (b. 1924)
- 23 July – Michael Roth, German engineer (b. 1936)
- 27 July – John Robert Schrieffer, American physicist and Nobel laureate (b. 1931)
- 28 July
  - Walter Fiers, Belgian molecular biologist (b. 1931)
  - Li Jisheng, Chinese aerospace engineer (b. 1943)
- 1 August
  - Charles Fadley, American physicist (b. 1941)
  - Zha Quanxing, Chinese electrochemist (b. 1925)
  - Anders P. Ravin, Danish computer scientist (b. 1947)
- 2 August – Carl Bell, American psychiatrist (b. 1947)
- 3 August
  - Steven Gubser, American physicist (b. 1972)
  - Nikolai Kardashev, Russian astrophysicist, author of Kardashev scale (b. 1932)
- 4 August – Ann Nelson, American particle physicist (b. 1958)
- 6 August
  - Zhuo Renxi, Chinese chemist (b. 1931)
  - George F. Simmons, American mathematician (b. 1925)
- 7 August
  - Donald F. Klein, American psychiatrist (b. 1928)
  - Kary Mullis, American biochemist and Nobel laureate (b. 1944)
- 8 August – Stanislaw Konturek, Polish physiologist (b. 1931)
- 10 August – Radoslav Katičić, Croatian linguist (b. 1930)
- 11 August
  - Michael E. Krauss, American linguist (b. 1934)
  - Geoff Malcolm, New Zealand physical chemist (b. 1930)
- 12 August – Danny Cohen, Israeli computer scientist (b. 1937)
- 15 August – Qin Hanzhang, Chinese food scientist (b.1908)
- 20 August – Li Houwen, Chinese surgeon (b. 1927)
- 23 August – Walter Thiel, German chemist (b. 1949)
- 26 August – Chen Jiayong, Chinese metallurgist and chemical engineer (b. 1922)
- 27 August – Zhang Zong, Chinese crystallographer (b. 1929)
- 31 August
  - Wang Buxuan, Chinese physicist (b. 1922)
  - Immanuel Wallerstein, American sociologist (b. 1930)
- 8 September – Chris Dobson, British chemist (b. 1949)
- 11 October – Alexei Leonov, Soviet cosmonaut (Voskhod 2), first person to walk in space. (b. 1934)
- 1 November – Gilles Fontaine, Canadian astrophysicist (b. 1948)
- 2 November – Irwin Fridovich, American biochemist (b. 1929)
- 6 November – Michael Hanack, German chemist (b. 1931)
- 7 November – Margarita Salas, Spanish biochemist and geneticist (b. 1938)
- 18 November – Ching-Liang Lin, Taiwanese physicist (b. 1931)
- 20 November – Mary L. Good, American chemist and politician
- 26 November – Cyrus Chothia, English biochemist (b. 1942)
- 16 December – Hans Kornberg, British-American biochemist (b. 1928)

== See also ==
- 2019 in spaceflight
- List of emerging technologies
- List of years in science
