= Horse Ridge (chip) =

Cryogenic control chip

Intel "Horse Ridge" is a cryogenic control chip that presented at the International Solid State Circuits Conference 2020 of San Francisco.

Horse Ridge is based on Intel's 22nm FFL (FinFET Low Power) CMOS technology. Intel and QuTech published a study in Nature in which they demonstrate that they have been able to operate qubits at temperatures above 1 degree Kelvin (-272.15 degrees Celsius).

In December 2020, Intel released Horse Ridge II, adding enhanced capabilities and higher levels of integration for sophisticated control of the quantum system. New features include the ability to manipulate and read qubit states (and drive up to 16 spin qubits with a direct digital synthesis (DDS) architecture) and control the potential of multiple gates needed to correlate multiple qubits (features 22 high-speed digital-to-analog converters (DACs)).

Horse Ridge II is also implemented using Intel's low-power 22 nm FinFET technology (22FFL) and its operation has been tested at a temperature of 4 degree Kelvin.
