= Transportin-3 =

Protein-coding gene in the species Homo sapiens

TNPO3
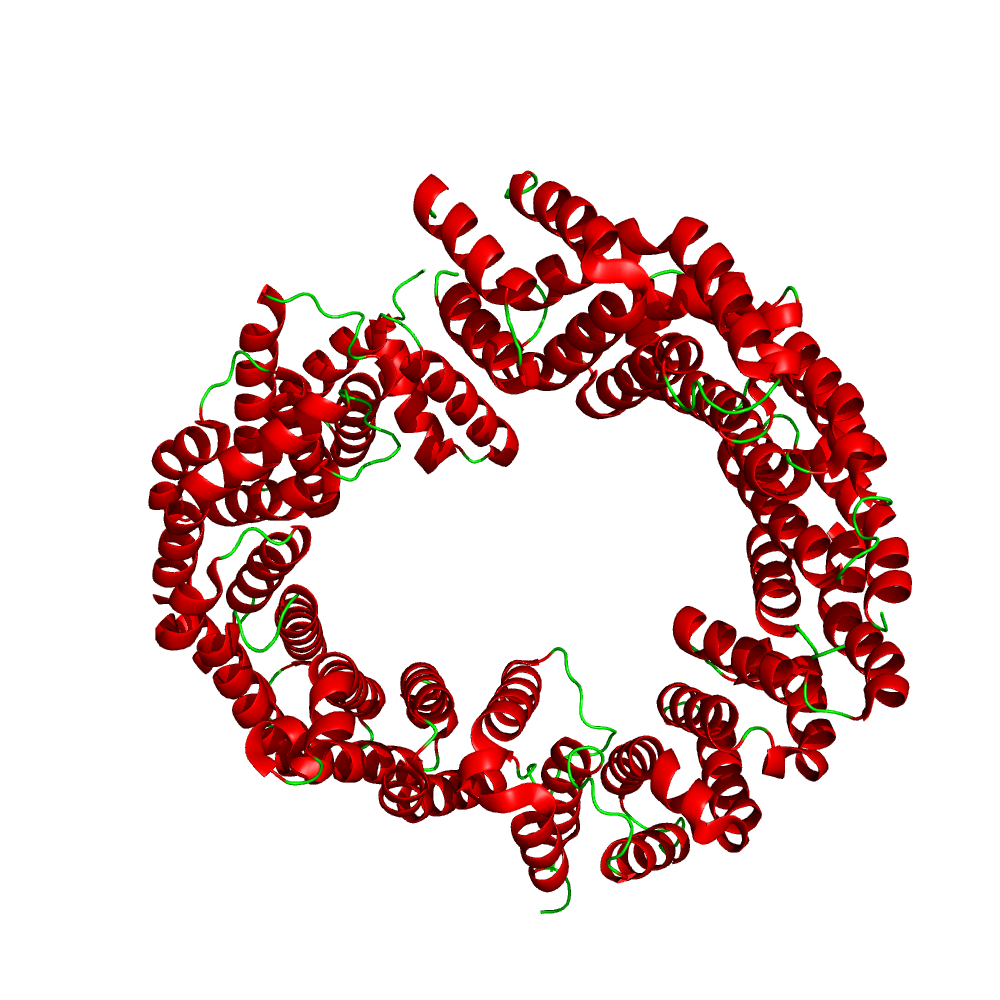

Identifiers
- Aliases: TNPO3, IPO12, LGMD1F, MTR10A, TRN-SR, TRN-SR2, TRNSR, transportin 3, LGMDD2
- External IDs: OMIM: 610032; MGI: 1196412; GeneCards: TNPO3
Available structures
PDB	Ortholog search: PDBe RCSB
PDB	List of PDB id codes 4C0O, 4C0P, 4C0Q, 4OL0

Gene location (Human)
Chr.	Chromosome 7 (human)
Band	7q32.1	Start	128,954,180 bp
Band	7q32.1	End	129,055,173 bp

Gene location (Mouse)
Chr.	Chromosome 6 (mouse)
Band	6 A3.3|6 12.36 cM	Start	29,540,826 bp
Band	6 A3.3|6 12.36 cM	End	29,609,886 bp
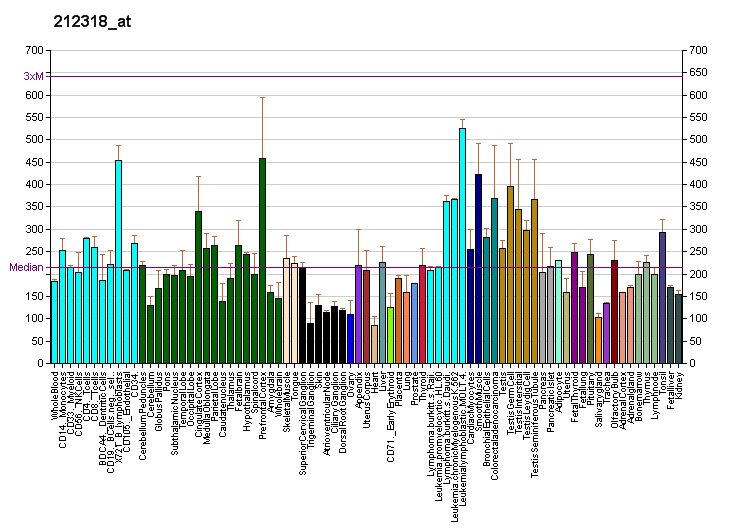

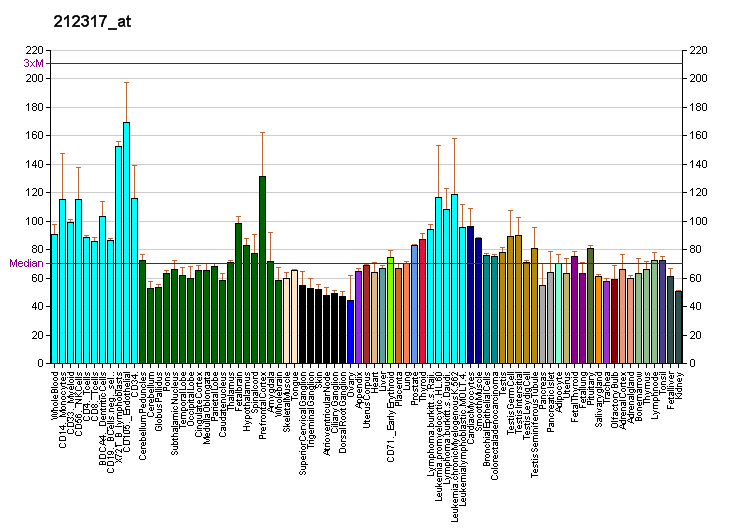

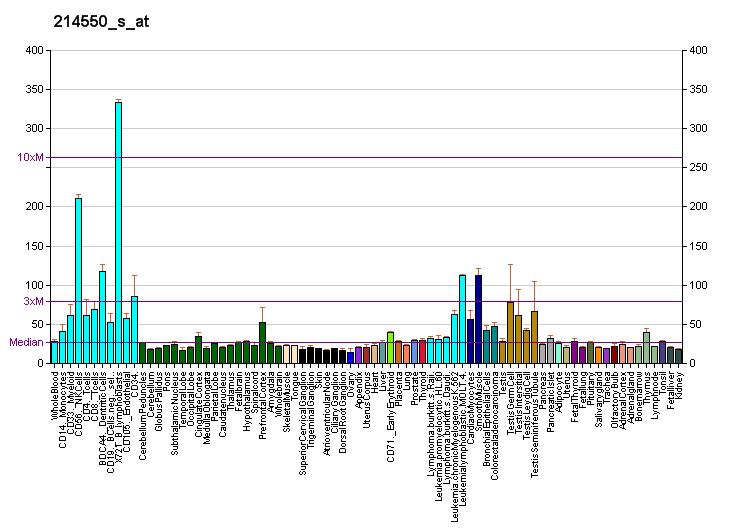
RNA expression pattern
Bgee	Human / Mouse (ortholog); Top expressed in: secondary oocyte; tendon of biceps brachii; internal globus pallidus; pars reticulata; pars compacta; lateral nuclear group of thalamus; external globus pallidus; olfactory bulb; dorsal motor nucleus of vagus nerve; beta cell / Top expressed in: epiblast; maxillary prominence; mandibular prominence; spermatocyte; Ileal epithelium; ventricular zone; Rostral migratory stream; tail of embryo; epithelium of lens; renal corpuscle; More reference expression data
BioGPS	More reference expression data
Gene ontology
Molecular function	nuclear localization sequence binding; protein binding; identical protein binding; signaling receptor activity; nuclear import signal receptor activity
Cellular component	cytoplasm; nuclear membrane; intracellular membrane-bounded organelle; nucleus
Biological process	protein transport; signal transduction; protein import into nucleus; transport
Sources:Amigo / QuickGO
Orthologs
Databases	NCBI: entry; OMA: entry
Species	Human	Mouse
Entrez	23534	320938
Ensembl	ENSG00000064419	ENSMUSG00000012535
UniProt	Q9Y5L0	Q6P2B1
RefSeq (mRNA)	NM_001191028; NM_012470	NM_177296; NM_001347079; NM_001361290
RefSeq (protein)	NP_001177957; NP_036602; NP_001369145; NP_001369146; NP_001369147 NP_001369148; NP_001369149; NP_001369150; NP_001369151; NP_001369152; NP_036602.1	NP_001334008; NP_796270; NP_001348219
Location (UCSC)	Chr 7: 128.95 – 129.06 Mb	Chr 6: 29.54 – 29.61 Mb
PubMed search
- Wikidata
View/Edit Human	View/Edit Mouse

Transportin-3 is a protein that in humans is encoded by the TNPO3 gene.

== Function ==
TNPO3 is a nuclear import receptor for serine/arginine-rich (SR) proteins, including Serine/arginine-rich splicing factor 1, which are essential precursor-mRNA splicing factors.

== Clinical significance ==
The TNPO3-IRF5 locus is implicated in primary biliary cirrhosis and systemic sclerosis.
