= Charles Fadley =

American physicist (1941–2019)

Charles Sherwood Fadley (September 4, 1941 – August 1, 2019) was an American physicist who was a professor at University of California, Davis and an elected Fellow of the American Physical Society, the American Association for the Advancement of Science, the American Vacuum Society and the Institute of Physics.

He was born in Norwalk, Ohio and gained a B.S degree in chemical engineering at MIT and in 1970 a doctorate in chemical engineering at UC Berkeley. He then spent a year as a postdoctoral researcher at the Chalmers University of Technology in Sweden, followed by a period of teaching undergraduate physics at the University of Dar es Salaam in Tanzania. After joining the department of chemistry at the University of Hawaii at Manoa as an assistant professor in 1972, he was appointed professor of chemistry at the University of Hawaii at Honolulu in 1978. He left there in 1991 to take up a position as a professor of physics at UC Davis, becoming distinguished professor of physics in 1999. He retired in 2018.

The citation for his induction as a Fellow of the American Physical Society in 1987 read that it was "For experimental and theoretical contributions to the development of photoelectron spectroscopy for core-level chemical shifts, multiplet splittings, surface-sensitivity enhancement, photoelectron diffraction, and angle-resolved valence band studies."

He died of cancer in Berkeley, California in 2019 from at the age of 77.
