= Ourasphaira giraldae =

Ourasphaira giraldae Temporal range: 1000 Ma

Scientific classification
- Domain: Eukaryota
- Kingdom: Fungi (?)
- Genus: †Ourasphaira
- Species: †O. giraldae

Binomial name
- †Ourasphaira giraldae Loron et al., 2019

Extinct species of fungus

Ourasphaira giraldae is an extinct process-bearing multicellular eukaryotic microorganism. Corentin Loron argues that it was an early fungus. It existed approximately a billion years ago during the time of the transition from the Mesoproterozoic to Neoproterozoic periods, and was unearthed in the Amundsen Basin in the Canadian Arctic, specifically from layers within the Grassy Bay Formation. This fungus may have existed on land well before plants.

== See also ==
- 2019 in paleontology
