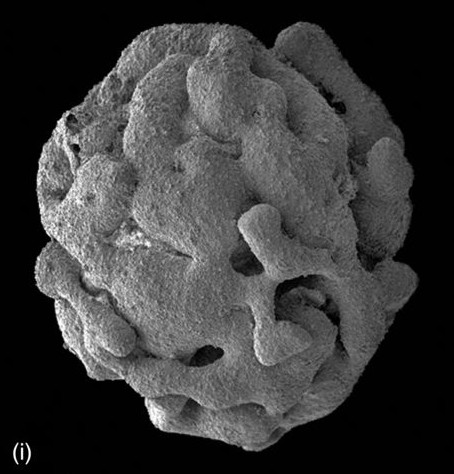

Scientific classification
- Kingdom: Animalia
- Genus: †Caveasphaera

= Caveasphaera =

Caveasphaera Temporal range: Ediacaran, 609 Ma

Possible very early animal found in ancient rocks

Caveasphaera is a multicellular organism found in 609-million-year-old rocks laid down during the Ediacaran period in the Guizhou Province of South China. The organism is not easily defined as an animal or non-animal. The organism is notable due to the study of related embryonic fossils (measuring about a half-millimeter in diameter) which display different stages of its development: from early single-cell stages to later multicellular stages. Such fossil studies present the earliest evidence of an essential step in animal evolution – the ability to develop distinct tissue layers and organs. According to researchers, fossil studies of Caveasphaera have suggested that animal-like embryonic development arose much earlier than the oldest clearly defined animal fossils and may be consistent with studies suggesting that animal evolution may have begun about 750 million years ago. Nonetheless, Caveasphaera fossils may look similar to starfish and coral embryos. Still, researchers have concluded, "Parental investment in the embryonic development of Caveasphaera and co-occurring Tianzhushania and Spiralicellula, as well as delayed onset of later development, may reflect an adaptation to the heterogeneous nature of the early Ediacaran nearshore marine environments in which early animals evolved."
