= Cold quasar =

Type of galaxy

A cold quasar is a rare population of luminous unobscured quasars associated with starburst galaxies with a high rate of star formation of about 1000 solar masses per year. These quasars have a significant amount of cold gas at the center of the galaxy. Theses rare types of quasars are not well explained by simplistic models of quasar evolution and fueling.

There are 64 galaxies that are described to host a cold quasar.

== Discovery ==
The discovery of cold quasars was formally announced in 2019 by Professor Allison Kirkpatrick at the 234th meeting of the American Astronomical Society in St. Louis.
