= High-area rapid printing =

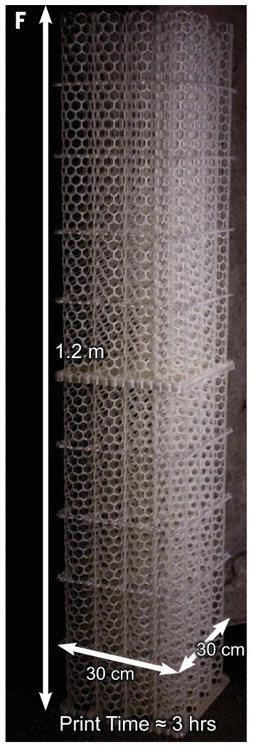
Figure 1. 30 cm x 30 cm x 1.2 m object created via HARP. Taken from Ref. [1].

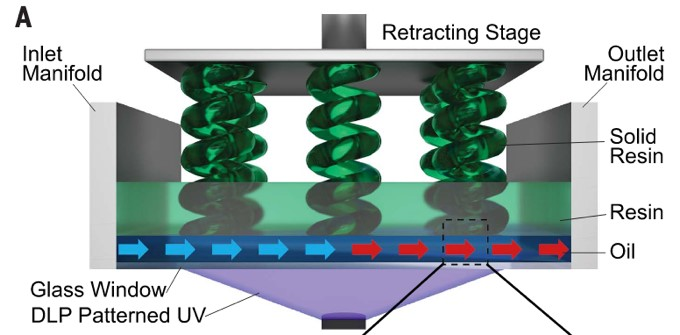
Figure 2. Schematic for 3D printing using HARP. Taken from Ref. [1].

High-area rapid printing (HARP) is a stereolithography (SLA) method that permits the continuous, high-throughput printing of large objects at rapid speeds (Figure 1). This method was introduced in 2019 by the Mirkin Research Group at Northwestern University in order to address drawbacks associated with traditional SLA manufacturing processes. Since the polymerization reactions involved in SLA are highly exothermic processes, the production of objects at high-throughputs is associated with high temperatures that can result in structural defects. HARP addresses this problem by utilizing a solid-liquid slip boundary (Figure 2) that cools the resin by withdrawing heat from the system. This allows for large structures to be fabricated quickly without the temperature-associated defects inherent to other SLA processes.

== Design and function ==
Additive manufacturing, or 3D printing, has allowed for the rapid prototyping of intricate structures that are not accessible via traditional manufacturing processes and has found specific applications in tissue engineering and high-strength materials production. SLA is one such approach, which typically utilizes ultraviolet light to cure a photoactive resin onto a vertically moving plate. Stereolithography is traditionally realized by printing successive 2D layers between the vertically moving plate and the bottom of the vat in order to build up a three-dimensional (3D) object. This process is time-consuming as each layer must be mechanically cleaved from the bottom of the resin vat before another layer can be printed. Recent advances employ an oxygen “dead zone” between the bottom of the vat and the polymerized object to achieve continuous liquid interface production (CLIP). Because the polymerizing object is no longer in contact with the bottom of the resin vat, mechanical cleavage is not necessary, making CLIP a continuous stereolithographic process. CLIP is being used by Carbon 3D to manufacture parts approximately 100 times faster than traditional SLA methodologies. At these print speeds, however, the heat generated from the exothermic polymerization reactions can result in deformation of the printed object.

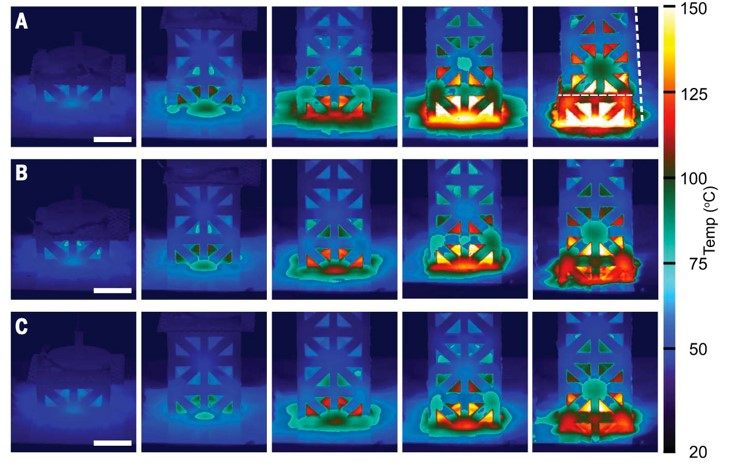
Figure 3. A comparison of temperatures arising from SLA printing with HARP with (A) no oil flow; (B) oil flow but no cooling; or (C) oil flow and cooling of the oil using a heat exchanger. Elapsed time between panels is ~500 s; Scale bars = 25 mm. Taken from Ref. [1].

HARP utilizes a circulating fluorinated oil layer below the resin to remove heat at the boundary between the oil and the resin, cooling the system (Figure 2). The fluorinated oil is circulated at a rate that supports the formation of a solid-liquid slip boundary, and therefore, low adhesion between the printed object and the transparent vat. The slip boundary ensures uniformity of both topology and temperature across the interface and allows for continuous printing but at substantially higher throughputs than CLIP. The heat dissipation is a consequence of the direct contact between the fluorinated oil and the hot, polymerizing resin, since heat is effectively transferred from the resin to the oil. The hot oil is then flowed out of the reaction bath, cooled, filtered, and subsequently reintroduced into the system. Thus, control over the temperature of the system is attained. Even the printing of small structures via a SLA process at high-throughput without cooling results in temperatures at which deformation of the desired structure occurs (Figure 3A). In contrast, when HARP is used with cooling, markedly decreased temperatures are observed without a reduction in part quality (Figure 3C). HARP is also compatible with traditional stereolithographic resins; this has been demonstrated with polyurethane acrylate, butadiene rubber, and silicon carbide ceramic. At the time of writing, HARP had printed the largest structure based on SLA 3D printing (0.30 x 0.30 x 1.2-meters) to date in approximately three hours (Figure 1).

Professor Chad Mirkin, Dr. James Hedrick, and Dr. David Walker founded Azul3D (previously CDJ Technologies) for the purpose of commercializing the HARP platform.
