= Li Houwen =

Chinese surgeon (1927–2019)

Li Houwen (Chinese: 李厚文; June 1927 – 20 August 2019) was a Chinese surgeon who specialized in the treatment of lung cancer. He served as President of China Medical University.

== Biography ==
Li was born in June 1927 in Dandong, Liaoning, Republic of China. He worked at the No. 1 Hospital of China Medical University (CMU) in Shenyang, and was appointed Director of Chest Surgery of the hospital. In 1983, he became Vice President of China Medical University, and later promoted to President. He founded CMU's stomatological hospital and reestablished its No. 3 Hospital.

Li specialized in the treatment of lung cancer, and is considered a main founder of lung cancer surgery in China. He advised over 30 doctoral and master's students, and published more than ten books, including China's first monograph on lung cancer in 1984.

He served as the inaugural chairman of the China International Lung Cancer Society. He was awarded a special pension for distinguished experts by the State Council of the People's Republic of China, and an honorary doctorate by Hamamatsu University School of Medicine of Japan.

Li died on 20 August 2019, aged 92.
