= 2019 in Taiwan =

- Decades: 1990s; 2000s; 2010s; 2020s
- See also: Other events of 2019; History of Taiwan • Timeline • Years

Events from the year 2019 in Taiwan, Republic of China. This year is numbered Minguo 108 according to the official Republic of China calendar.

== Incumbents ==
- President: Tsai Ing-wen
- Vice President: Chen Chien-jen
- Premier:
  - William Lai (until 13 January)
  - Su Tseng-chang (from 14 January)
- Vice Premier:
  - Shih Jun-ji (until 13 January)
  - Chen Chi-mai (from 14 January)

== Events ==
=== January ===
- 25 January – The merger of Minkuotang into Congress Party Alliance.
- 27 January – First two of six 2019 Taiwanese by-elections held.

=== March ===
- 16 March – Remaining four of six 2019 Taiwanese by-elections held.

=== April ===
- 13 April – The official opening of Taikang Cultural Center in Annan District, Tainan.
- 18 April – 2019 Hualien earthquake
- 24 April – The inauguration of National Academy of Marine Research in Cianjhen District, Kaohsiung.

=== May ===
- 12 May – The opening of Tainan City Zuojhen Fossil Park in Zuozhen District, Tainan.

=== June ===
- 28 June – The Legislative Yuan passes amendments to the Judges Act allowing litigants and victims of crime to petition directly for the evaluation of judges and prosecutors.

=== July ===
- 1 July – The closing of Taiyuan Asian Puppet Theatre Museum in Datong, Taipei.
- 15 July – The opening of Jiahou Line Bikeway in Taichung.

=== August ===
- 6 August – Founding of the Taiwan People's Party.
- 18 August – Founding of the Taiwan Action Party Alliance.

=== September ===
- 16–22 September – 2019 OEC Kaohsiung
- 16 September – The Republic of China terminated diplomatic relations with the Solomon Islands.
- 20 September – The Republic of China terminated diplomatic relations with Kiribati.

=== October ===
- 1 October – The collapse of Nanfang'ao Bridge in Su'ao, Yilan County.
- 14–20 October – 2019 Asian Baseball Championship

=== November ===
- 30 November – The closing of Core Pacific City in Songshan, Taipei.

=== December ===
- 31 December – The Anti-infiltration Act passes third legislative reading.

== Deaths ==
- 8 January – Huang Chin-tao, 93, Taiwanese World War II veteran (Imperial Japanese Navy) and resistance fighter (27 Brigade).
- 21 January – Gigi Wu, 36, Taiwanese mountaineer.
- 23 January – Lin Ching-hsuan, 65, Taiwanese writer, heart attack.
- 9 February – Huang Erh-hsuan, 82, Taiwanese politician, MLY (1993–2002).
- 14 February – Kao Chun-ming, 89, Taiwanese Presbyterian minister and activist.
- 6 March – Mai Chao-cheng, 77, Taiwanese economist, member of Academia Sinica.
- 15 March – Luo Jye, 95, Taiwanese billionaire businessman, founder of Cheng Shin Rubber.
- 23 March – Lee Shi-chi, 81, Taiwanese artist.
- 26 March – Chen Hsing-chin, 75, Taiwanese politician, throat cancer.
- 5 May – Shih Chi-yang, 84, Taiwanese politician, Minister of Justice (1984–1988), Vice Premier (1988–1993) and President of the Judicial Yuan (1994–1999), multiple organ failure.
- 13 May – Lo Tung-bin, 92, Taiwanese biochemist.
- 23 May – Ping Hsin-tao, 92, Taiwanese translator, producer, and publisher.
- 1 June – Han Kuang-wei, Taiwanese naval officer and engineer.
- 9 June – Ma Ju-lung, 80, Taiwanese actor, (Cape No. 7, Monga, Warriors of the Rainbow: Seediq Bale), infection.
- 12 June – Chang Liyi, 89, Taiwanese pilot (ROCAF), heart attack.
- 26 July – Hwung Hwung-hweng, 72, Taiwanese hydraulic engineer, president of National Cheng Kung University (2011–2015), chairman of the Aviation Safety Council (2015–2018), minister of the Ocean Affairs Council (2018–2019).
- 16 August – Roland Peter Brown, 93, American physician based in Taiwan.
- 4 September – Tsem Tulku Rinpoche, 53, Taiwanese-born Malaysian Tibetan tulku, liver failure.
- 8 September – Roger Hsieh, 85, Taiwanese politician, MLY (1993–1999).
- 16 September – Chiang Tu-hui, 49, Taiwanese voice actress (Crayon Shin-chan, Chibi Maruko-chan), multiple organ failure.
- 10 October – Tsai Ying-wen, 67, Taiwanese political scientist.
- 15 November – Olav Bjørgaas, 93, Norwegian physician (Norwegian Mission Alliance) in Taiwan.
- 18 November – Ching-Liang Lin, 88, Taiwanese physicist.
- 24 November – J. Bruce Jacobs, 76, American-born Australian Taiwan studies academic, cancer.
- 25 November – Chang Jen-hu, 92, Taiwanese geographer.
- 27 November – Godfrey Gao, 35, Taiwanese-Canadian model and actor (The Mortal Instruments: City of Bones, Love is a Broadway Hit, Legend of the Ancient Sword), heart attack.
- 17 December – Yu Tien-tsung, 84, Taiwanese nativist writer.
