= Yingwen =

Yingwen is the Mandarin Pinyin spelling of a Chinese unisex given name.

People with this name include:

- Tsai Ying-wen (political scientist) (1952–2019), Taiwanese political scientist and translator
- Tsai Ing-wen (born 1956), Taiwanese politician who has served as the president of the Republic of China (Taiwan) since 2016
- Jolene Chin (陈影雯; also known as Chen Yingwen, born 1980), beauty pageant queen from Kuala Lumpur, Malaysia
- Zhu Yingwen (born 1981), female Olympic medal-winning swimmer from the People's Republic of China
- Wu Ying-wen (吳應文), Taiwanese politician who served as the county magistrate of Pingtung from 2004 to 2005

== Other uses ==
- Emperor Yingwen (disambiguation)
