= What Is Philosophy? =

What is Philosophy? may refer to these books:

- What Is Philosophy? (Deleuze and Guattari book)
- What Is Philosophy? (Heidegger book)
- What Is Philosophy? (Agamben book)
