= Hostis humani generis =

Legal term for criminals beyond any legal protection

Hostis humani generis (Latin for 'an enemy of mankind') is a legal term of art that originates in admiralty law. Before the adoption of public international law, pirates and slavers were generally held to be beyond legal protection and so could be dealt with by any nation, even one that had not been directly attacked.

A comparison can be made between this concept and the common law "writ of outlawry", which declared a person outside the king's law, a literal out-law, subject to violence and execution by anyone. The ancient Roman civil law concept of proscription, and the status of homo sacer conveyed by proscription may also be similar.

== Background ==
Perhaps the oldest of the laws of the sea is the prohibition of piracy, as the peril of being set upon by pirates, who are not motivated by national allegiance, is shared by the vessels and mariners of all nations, and thus represents a crime upon all nations. Since classical antiquity, pirates have been held to be individuals waging private warfare, a private campaign of sack and pillage, against not only their victims, but against all nations, and thus, those engaging in piracy hold the particular status of being regarded as hostis humani generis, the enemy of humanity. Since piracy anywhere is a peril to every mariner and ship everywhere, it is held to be the universal right and the universal duty of all nations, regardless of whether their ships have been beset by the particular band of pirates in question, to capture, try by a regularly constituted court-martial or admiralty court (in extreme circumstances, by means of a drumhead court-martial convened by the officers of the capturing ship), and, if found guilty, to execute the pirate via means of hanging from the yard-arm of the capturing ship, an authoritative custom of the sea.

Although summary battlefield punishment was conducted by certain nations at certain times with regard to pirates, it was regarded as irregular, as individuals captured with pirates could potentially have a defense to charges of piracy, such as coercion. Nonetheless, it was regarded as lawful if the attenuation of due process was dictated by urgent military necessity. For instance, in early 1831, the 250-strong crew captured off Ascension was brought to Ascension and summarily hanged, as they were acting in a rebellious manner and threatening to overthrow the 30-man crew of HMS Falcon, a British sloop-of-war, which took them captive. As the summary punishment, in this case, was due to military necessity, there was clear evidence of the offense, and it was done proximate in time and location to the battlefield, it can be classified as merely irregular, and not a violation of the custom of the sea.

== Theorized extended usages of the term ==
The land and airborne analogues of pirates, bandits and hijackers are not subject to universal jurisdiction in the same way as piracy; this is despite arguments that they should be. Instead these crimes, along with terrorism, torture, crimes against internationally protected persons and the financing of terrorism are subject to the aut dedere aut judicare principle (meaning prosecute or extradite). In the current global climate of international terrorism some commentators have called for terrorists of all sorts to be treated hostis humani generis.

Other commentators, such as John Yoo, have called for the extension of this hypothetical connection of hostis humani generis from pirates to hijackers to terrorists all the way to that of "unlawful enemy combatants". Unlawful enemy combatants, or persons captured in war who do not fight on behalf of a recognized sovereign state, have become an increasingly common phenomenon in contemporary wars, such as the War in Afghanistan, Iraq War, Chechen Wars and Syrian Civil War.

== Actual extended usages of the term ==
The only actual extension of hostis humani generis blessed by courts of law has been its extension to torturers. This has been done by decisions of U.S. and international courts; specifically, in a case tried in the United States in 1980, Filártiga v. Peña-Irala, 630 F.2d 876, the United States 2nd Circuit Court ruled that it could exercise jurisdiction over agents of the Alfredo Stroessner military dictatorship of Paraguay (in their individual capacity) who were found to have committed the crime of torture against a Paraguayan citizen, using its jurisdiction under the Offenses Clause of the Constitution of the United States, the Alien Tort Claims Act, and customary international law. In deciding this, the court famously stated that "Indeed, for purposes of civil liability, the torturer has become like the pirate and slave trader before him: hostis humani generis, an enemy of all mankind." This usage of the term hostis humani generis has been reinforced by the ruling of the International Criminal Tribunal for the Former Yugoslavia in the conviction of a torturer in Prosecutor v. Furundžija.

In the Eichmann trial of 1961, the Jerusalem District Court did not explicitly deem Adolf Eichmann a hostis humani generis. The prosecution, however, invoked the standard, ultimately cited in the verdict by reference to piracy.

== See also ==
- Aut dedere aut judicare
- Banning
- Habeas corpus
- Homo sacer
- Outlawry
- Persona non grata
- Torture
- Universal jurisdiction
- Protect America Act Section 105B(l)
- November 13, 2001 Presidential Military Order

== Literature ==
- Alcaide Fernández, Joaquín (2012). "Hostes humani generis: Pirates, Slavers, and Other Criminals". In Fassbender, Bardo; Peters, Anne (eds.). The Oxford Handbook of the History of International Law. Oxford: Oxford University Press. pp. 120–144. ISBN 9780199599752.
- de Wilde, Marc (2018). "Enemy of All Humanity: The Dehumanizing Effects of a Dangerous Concept". Netherlands Journal of Legal Philosophy. 47 (2): 158–175. doi:10.5553/NJLP/221307132018047002005. hdl:11245.1/54a2aa28-dd93-4604-bdf5-66a16e68b035.
- Edelstein, Dan (2009). The Terror of Natural Right: Republicanism, the Cult of Nature, and the French Revolution. Chicago: The University of Chicago Press. ISBN 9780226184388.
- Heller-Roazen, Daniel (2009). The Enemy of All: Piracy and the Law of Nations. New York: Zone Books. ISBN 9781890951948.
- Luban, David (2018). "The Enemy of All Humanity". Netherlands Journal of Legal Philosophy. 47 (2): 123–124. doi:10.5553/NJLP/221307132018047002002.
- McIntyre, Juliette; Paige, Tamsin Philippa; Guilfoyle, Douglas (2025-05-30). "42. Piracy and Madness". Called to the Bar: International Law over Drinks (Podcast).
