= What Is Philosophy? (Agamben book) =

- First edition (Italian)
- Author: Giorgio Agamben
- Original title: Che cos’è la filosofia?
- Translator: Lorenzo Chiesa
- Language: Italian
- Subjects: Philosophy, linguistics
- Publisher: Quodlibet
- Publication date: 2016
- Publication place: Italy
- English publication date: 2017; Stanford University Press
- ISBN: 9781503602205

What Is Philosophy? (Italian: Che cos’è la filosofia?) is a 2016 book by Giorgio Agamben in which the author provides a "complex, rich investigation into the nature of philosophy".

== See also ==
- Metaphilosophy
