= Sicao Fortress =

Former fort in Annan, Tainan, Taiwan

- 四草砲台
- Annan, Tainan, Taiwan
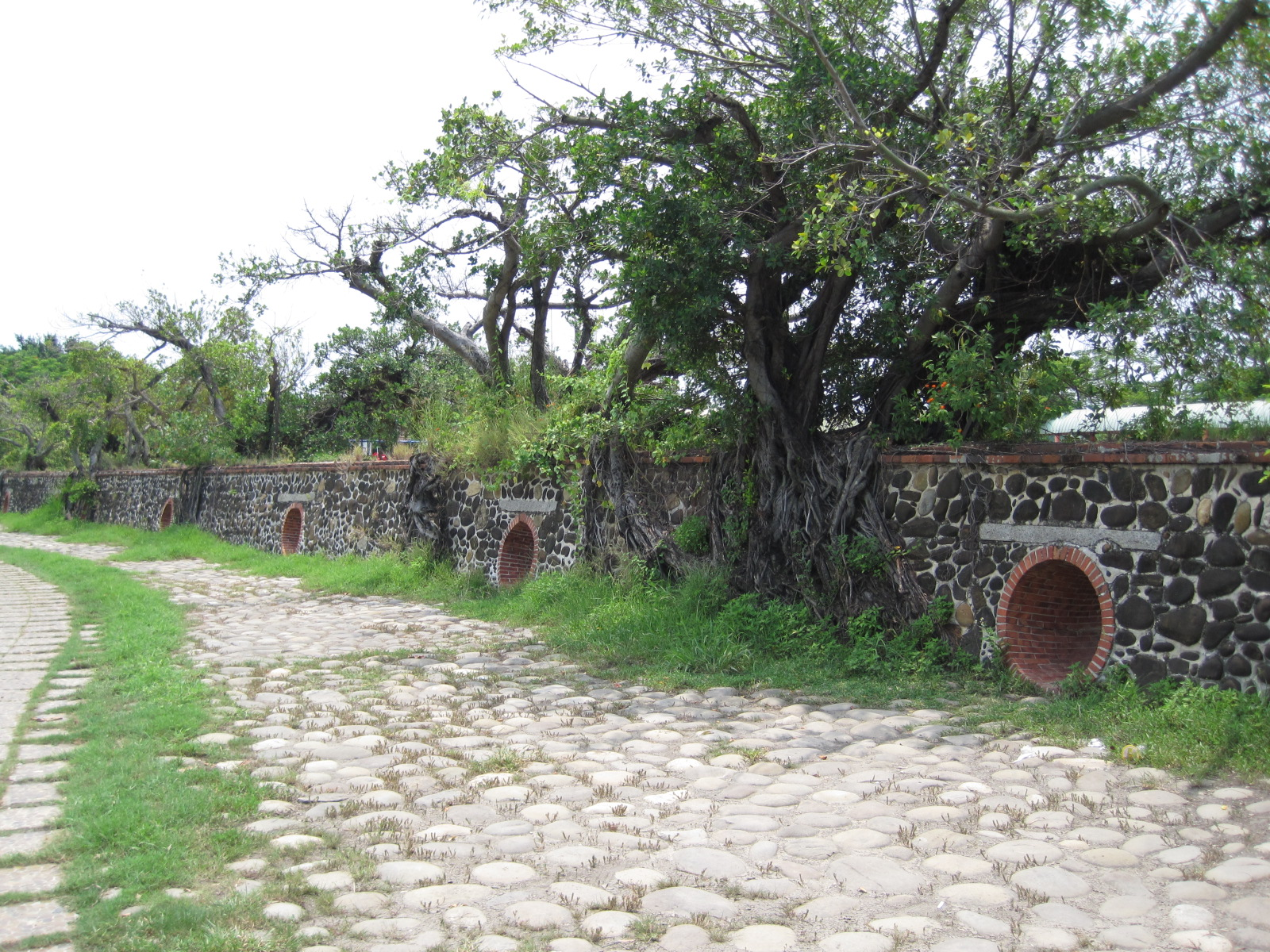

Site information
- Type: fort

Location
- Coordinates: 23°1′8.3″N 120°8′6.7″E

Site history
- Built by: Yao Ying
- Battles/wars: First Opium War

The Sicao Fortress (traditional Chinese: 四草砲台; simplified Chinese: 四草炮台; pinyin: Báimǐwèng Pàotái) is a former fort in Annan District, Tainan, Taiwan.

== History ==
The fortress was built during the First Opium War in 1840 during the Qing Dynasty rule of Taiwan by Commander Yao Ying to prevent British Empire troops from invading Taiwan. The fort was initially constructed as a temporary gun platform. However, later on an outer wall made of solid granite was constructed and an inner wall made of pebbles was also added.

== Architecture ==
The fortress has 13 round gun holes. It is now part of the wall of Zhenhai Elementary School.

== See also ==
- List of tourist attractions in Taiwan
