= Sicao Wetlands =

Wetland in Annan, Tainan, Taiwan

- 四草 (Chinese)
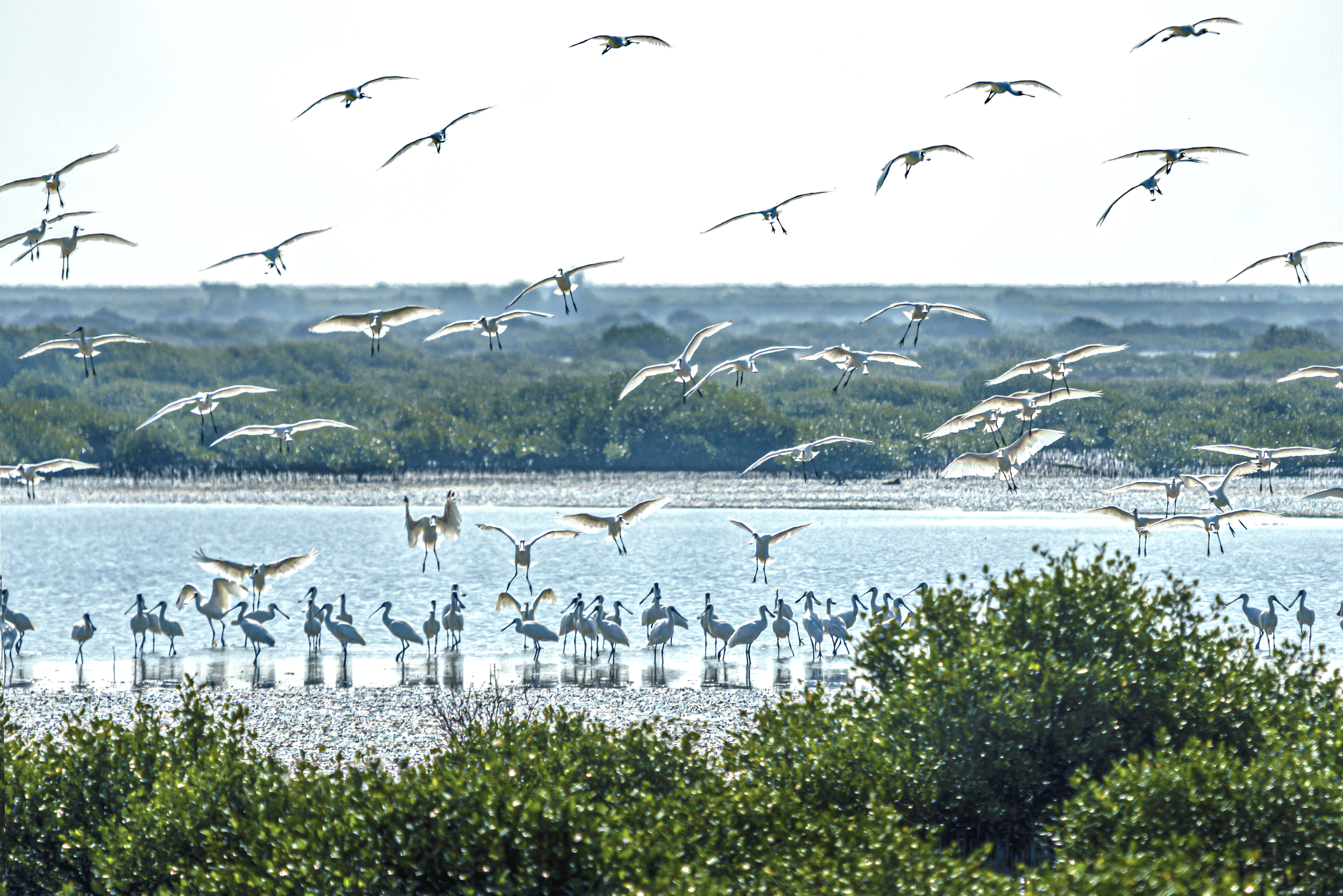

- Location within Tainan
- Location: Annan District, Tainan, Taiwan
- Coordinates: 23°01′46.8″N 120°08′15.9″E
- Type: Wetland
- Surface area: 5.15 km^{2} (1.99 sq mi)

The Sihcao Wetlands (Chinese: 四草; Hanyu Pinyin: Sìcǎo; Tongyong Pinyin: Sìhcǎo; Wade–Giles: Ssu^{4}-ts'ao^{3}) are wetlands in Annan District, Tainan, Taiwan. They were set aside in 1994 by the Tainan City Government and consist of approximately 515 hectares (1,270 acres).

The protected area in Taiwan consists of mangrove swamps, salt marshes, rivers, canals, and drainage ditches. It is located in Tainan City's Annan District, and consists of the area bounded by the southeastern side of the Luermen River, the southwestern side of Xi-Bin Road, and the northern side of the Yan-Shui River. Nearby is the Tainan Salt Pan Eco-village (台南市鹽田生態文化村).

In November 2004, the Sihcao Wildlife Refuge (四草野生動物保護區) was created to further protect the area, especially from possible encroachment from the nearby Tainan Technology Industrial Park.

In 2009, the Sihcao Wetlands became part of the Taijiang National Park.

== See also ==
- Banping Lake Wetland Park
- Gaomei Wetlands
