= Lorenzo Chiesa =

Italian political philosopher, critical theorist, and professor (born 1976)

- Chiesa giving a lecture on Anxiety at the Freud Museum, Vienna
- Born: 1976 (age 49–50)

Education
- Education: University of Warwick (PhD)

Philosophical work
- Era: Contemporary philosophy
- Region: Western philosophy
- School: Continental, Lacanianism
- Institutions: University of Kent
- Main interests: Psychoanalytic theory, Continental philosophy, Biopolitics
- Notable ideas: Paraontology, Meta-critical realism
- Website: https://www.lorenzochiesa.com/

Lorenzo Chiesa (born 25 April 1976) is a philosopher, critical theorist, translator, and professor whose academic research and works focus on the intersection between ontology, psychoanalysis, and political theory.

== Biography ==
Chiesa received his Laurea in filosofia (Bachelor of Philosophy) in 2000 from the University of Trieste in Italy, and their PhD in philosophy and literature from University of Warwick in 2006.

Chiesa is currently a Senior Lecturer in Philosophy at Newcastle University in the United Kingdom. He also teaches at the European Graduate School. Previously, he taught at the University of Kent (2006-2014), where he was a Full Professor of Modern European Thought and founded and directed the Centre for Critical Thought. He was also visiting professor in the MA programme in Socio-Political Philosophy of the European University at Saint Petersburg and at the Freud's Dream Museum in Saint Petersburg. Additionally, he served as Director of the Genoa School of Humanities in Italy.

Chiesa held visiting positions at the Freud Museum, London, the University of New Mexico, the Institute of Philosophy of Ljubljana, the Italian Institute of Human Sciences of Naples, the American University of Beirut, and Jnanapravaha Center for Cultural Studies of Mumbai. He is best known for his monographs on the French psychoanalyst Jacques Lacan published by MIT Press, and translations into English of works by the Italian political philosophers Giorgio Agamben and Paolo Virno, published by Stanford University Press and MIT Press. Chiesa serves as editor of the Insubordinations series at MIT Press. He has also written widely on contemporary French and Italian philosophy, biopolitics, Marxism, materialism and atheism.

Chiesa's philosophical treatise Subjectivity and Otherness (2007), which focuses on Lacan's theory of the subject, has been described as setting "a new benchmark of conceptual rigour within the realm of introductory texts on Lacanian thought". His treatment of the implications of psychoanalytic theory for materialism and atheism in The Not-Two (2016) has been extensively discussed by the Slovenian philosopher and Freudo-Marxist theorist Slavoj Žižek in his monograph Disparities. According to the Italian academic and political philosopher Roberto Esposito, Chiesa is "one of the rare philosophers capable of making Lacan’s psychoanalytic apparatus interact with the various languages of continental thought". He has also been referred to as "the leader of a new generation of ‘young Lacanians’, for whom Lacan is primarily a text that needs to be read". Chiesa argues that "psychoanalysis is not intrinsically political" while it is needed to "criticise classical ontology, think new ways in which to approach the question of ontology, and then, from that standpoint, think progressive politics".

== Selected bibliography ==
Authored books and edited volumes

- The Not-Two. Logic and God in Lacan (Cambridge MA: MIT Press, 2016) [Turkish translation, Istanbul: Sola Unitas (2019)]
- The Virtual Point of Freedom. Essays on Politics, Aesthetics, and Religion (Evanston IL: Northwestern University Press, 2016) [Italian translation, Salerno: Orthotes, 2019]
- Biopolitical Theory and Beyond: Genealogy, Psychoanalysis, Biology, special issue of Paragraph, Volume 39, Issue 1 (Edinburgh: Edinburgh University Press, 2016) [edited with Bostjan Nedoh and Marco Piasentier]
- Italian Thought Today: Bio-economy, Human Nature, Christianity (London and New York: Routledge, 2014) [edited]
- Lacan and Philosophy: The New Generation (Melbourne: Re.press, 2014) [edited]
- The Italian Difference: Between Nihilism and Biopolitics (Melbourne: Re.press, 2009) [edited with Alberto Toscano]
- Subjectivity and Otherness. A Philosophical Reading of Lacan (Cambridge MA: MIT Press, 2007) [Korean translation, Seoul: Nanjang Publishing (2012), with a new preface] [Russian translation, Saint Petersburg: Skifia Print (2021)] [Turkish translation, Istanbul: Axis (2022)] [German translation, Frankfurt: Neue Deutsch-Franzosische Jahrbucher (2022), with a new preface]
- Antonin Artaud. Verso un corpo senza organi (Verona: Ombre Corte, 2001)

Translated books

- P. Virno, The Idea of World (Kolkata: Seagull Books, 2022)
- P. Virno, Convention and Materialism (Cambridge MA: MIT Press, 2021)
- A. Kuliscioff, The Monopoly of Man (Cambridge MA: MIT Press, 2021)
- Elvio Fachinelli, The Still Arrow (Kolkata: Seagull Books, 2021)
- Giorgio Agamben, What Is Real? (Stanford CA: Stanford University Press, 2018)
- Giorgio Agamben, The Adventure (Cambridge MA: MIT Press, 2018)
- Giorgio Agamben, What Is Philosophy? (Stanford CA: Stanford University Press, 2017)
- Paolo Virno, An Essay on Negation. For a Linguistic Anthropology (London: Seagull Books, 2017)
- Giorgio Agamben, The Fire and the Tale (Stanford CA: Stanford University Press, 2017)
- Giorgio Agamben, The Kingdom and The Glory: For a Theological Genealogy of Economy and Government (Stanford CA: Stanford University Press, 2011) [with Matteo Mandarini]
- Slavoj Žižek, America Oggi: Abu Ghraib e altre oscenità del potere (Verona: Ombre Corte, 2005)
- Slavoj Žižek, Dello sguardo e altri oggetti. Saggi su cinema e psicoanalisi (Udine: Campanotto, 2004) [with Damiano Cantone]
- Slavoj Žižek, Il soggetto scabroso – Trattato di ontologia politica (Milan: Raffaello Cortina Editore, 2003) [with Damiano Cantone]
