= National Museum of Taiwan History =

Museum in Annan, Tainan, Taiwan

- 國立臺灣歷史博物館
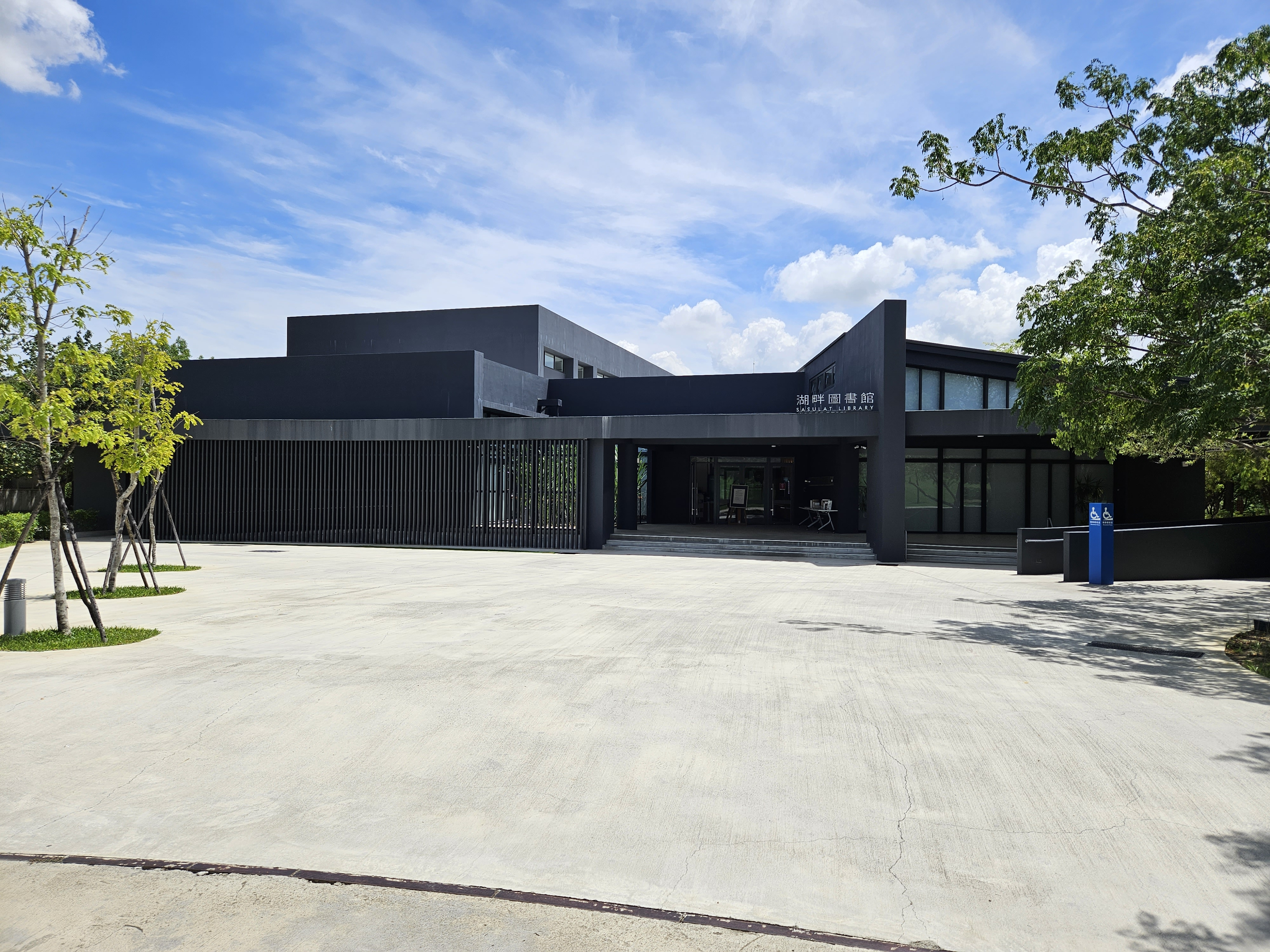
- Established: 29 October 2011
- Location: Annan, Tainan, Taiwan
- Coordinates: 23°03′30.3″N 120°14′05.5″E
- Type: museum
- Collection size: 60,000 artifacts
- Director: Lung-chi Chang (張隆志)
- Website: www.nmth.gov.tw/en/

The National Museum of Taiwan History (NMTH; traditional Chinese: 國立臺灣歷史博物館; simplified Chinese: 国立台湾历史博物馆; pinyin: Guólì Táiwān Lìshǐ Bówùguǎn) is a museum in Annan District, Tainan, Taiwan, covering the history of the island nation of Taiwan and its associated islands.

== History ==
The museum was originally planned to be opened in 2008, but it was instead opened in 2011 after 12 years of preparation.

== Exhibitions ==
The museum contains 60,000 artifacts spanning the Aboriginal, Dutch, Spanish, Chinese, British, and Japanese influences on Taiwan.

==== Sound Archive ====
The museum holds nearly 1,000 Japanese-era shellac discs. In 2015 it launched the online platform Taiwan Sound 100, which offers more than 300 historical recordings, mostly popular songs, as excerpts of about one and half minutes each. The collection also includes political recordings, such as My Hope, a speech by the activist Yang Chao-chia. It was recorded in Tokyo in April 1935 and privately pressed for use as propaganda by the Taiwan Local Autonomy Alliance. In it, Yang adresses Taiwanese youth and asks whether forty years of Japanese rule had really improved the lives of ordinary people and farmers.

== See also ==
- List of museums in Taiwan
