= Roland Peter Brown =

American physician (1926–2019)

Roland Peter Brown (5 June 1926 – 16 August 2019) was an American physician who spent the majority of his career in Taiwan.

== Life and career ==
Roland Peter Brown was born in Hebei, Republic of China, on 5 June 1926, where his father, a Mennonite religious leader and physician, was based. Brown was the youngest of five siblings; his two brothers and two sisters all died young. When his parents, Henry and Maria Brown, were taken as prisoners of war in 1941, in the midst of the Second Sino-Japanese War, Brown was sent to North Newton, Kansas, to live with relatives. Brown enrolled at Bethel College, and earned his medical qualifications in 1952, graduating from the University of Chicago School of Medicine. He settled in Hualien City, Taiwan, in 1953, and became a founding member of the first Mountain Tour Medical Team, which sought to reach patients in remote areas of Taiwan. In 1954, Brown established the Mennonite Christian Hospital in Hualien. The hospital began with 35 beds and charged indigenous and disadvantaged people NT$1 per visit during the first eight years of its operation. While Brown worked at the Mennonite Christian Hospital, he was never paid a salary. He also inaugurated several medical and social initiatives, among them milk stations for students, and funding for the care of premature infants, people with leukemia, and people who relied on dialysis. By 1968, a volunteer at the Mennonite Christian Hospital, Peter Huang, diagnosed Brown with rheumatism. Brown retired from his administrative position at Mennonite Christian Hospital in 1990, but continued the practice of medicine in Taiwan until 1994.

Brown married his wife, Sophie Schmidt, in 1948. She was one of three cofounders of the Hualien Christian School.

== Legacy ==
In 1991, the Taiwanese American Foundation honored Brown with its Social Service and Science Award. In a subsequent speech, Brown observed, "Doctors in Taiwan often feel America is closer than Hualien." This statement drew attention to the shortage of medical personnel in rural Taiwan. Peter Huang was inspired to return to Taiwan and lead the Mennonite Christian Hospital. In 1995, President of the Republic of China Lee Teng-hui bestowed upon Brown the Order of Brilliant Star with Violet Grand Cordon, and Brown received several other prizes for his work in Taiwan.

Brown spent his retirement years in North Newton, Kansas, with his wife Sophie, who died in 2010. In 2011, Brown's name was proposed for commemoration on a sculpture to honor expatriates based in Taiwan. The art piece took form as a metal tree by Liu Po-chun, which featured the name of Gian Carlo Michelini, among others. In 2017, Roland Brown published the memoir Healing Hands: Four Decades of Relief and Mission in Taiwan. He died in Newton, Kansas, on 16 August 2019, aged 93. The rapper Dwagie released a song commemorating Brown's career in Taiwan in April 2021.
