= Luerhmen History and Culture Museum =

Museum in Annan, Tainan, Taiwan

- 鹿耳門歷史文化區域地方文化館
- Established: 2004
- Location: Annan, Tainan, Taiwan
- Coordinates: 23°02′15″N 120°07′29″E
- Type: museum

The Luerhmen History and Culture Museum (traditional Chinese: 鹿耳門歷史文化區域地方文化館; simplified Chinese: 鹿耳门历史文化区域地方文化馆; pinyin: Lùěrmén Lìshǐ Wénhuà Qū Yù Dìfāng Wénhuàguǎn) is a historical and cultural complex in Annan District, Tainan, Taiwan.

== Name ==
Luerhmen literal meaning means deer ear gate.

== Architecture ==
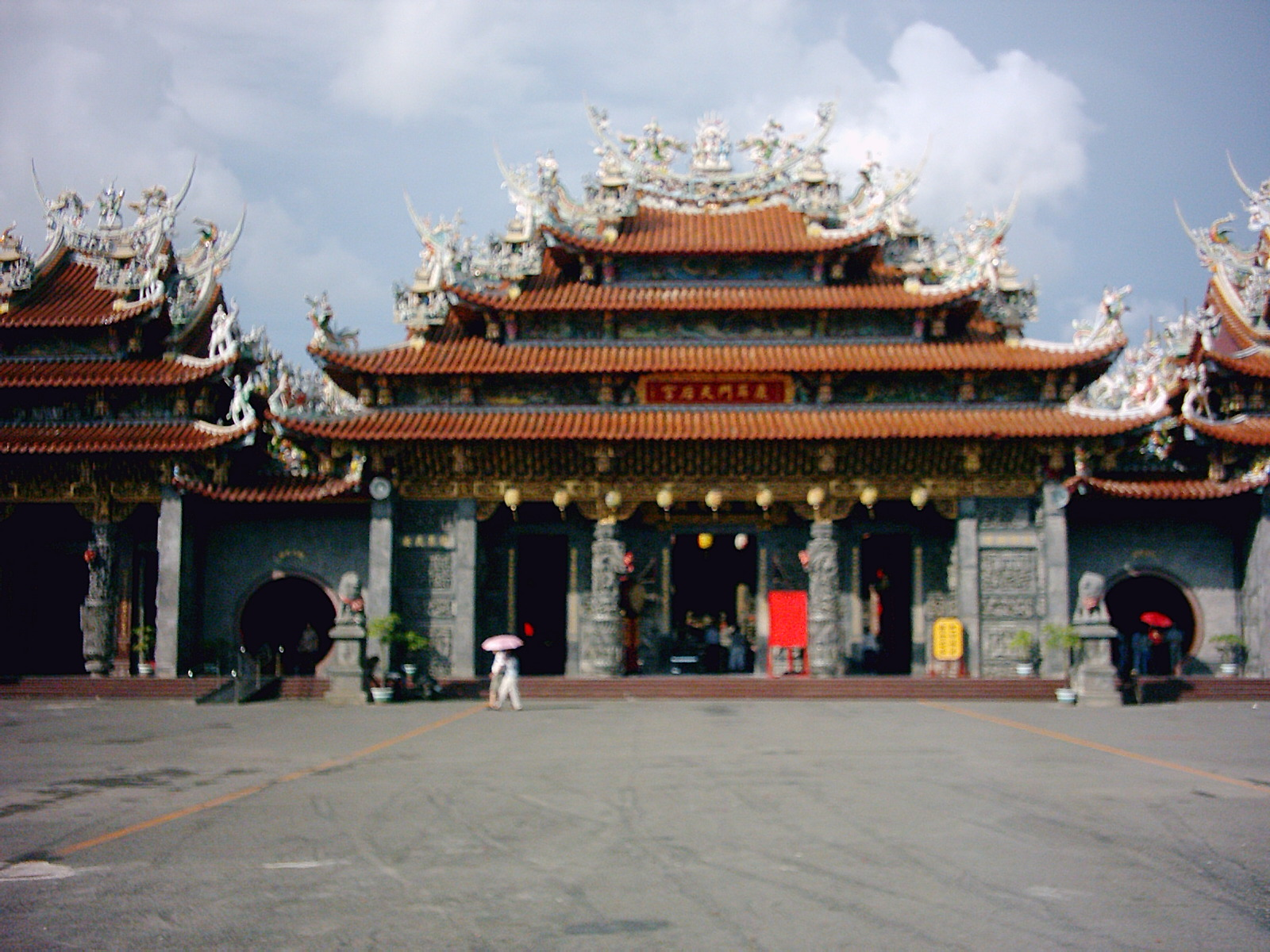
Luerhmen Tianhou Temple

The museum building consists of the Luerhmen Tianhou Temple (Chinese: 鹿耳門天后宮; pinyin: Lùěrmén Tiānhòu Gōng) which was built in 1604 dedicated to Mazu statue which were brought by Koxinga, Luerhmen Residence which was built with southern Fujian architectural style and Zheng Cheng-gong Heritage Museum with sets of collections about Koxinga.

== Events ==
The Luerhmen Tianhou Temple, dedicated to Mazu, has invited women to serve as "fairies" responsible for performing religious rituals during the first four days of Chinese New Year every year since the 1990s.

== Dispute ==
Since 1956, the Luerhmen Tianhou Temple and the Orthodox Luermen Shengmu Temple have disagreed about the precise location of Koxinga's landing in Taiwan, and adherents at each temple believe themselves to be the successor to the original temple he built or visited.

== Transportation ==
The museum is accessible by bus from Tainan Station of Taiwan Railway.

== See also ==
- List of museums in Taiwan
