= Homo sacer =

Status in Roman law

Homo sacer (Latin for "the sacred man" or "the accursed man") is a figure of Roman law: a person who is banned and might be killed by anybody, but must not be sacrificed in a religious ritual. Italian philosopher Giorgio Agamben takes the concept as the starting point of his main work Homo Sacer: Sovereign Power and Bare Life (1998).

== Roman antiquity ==
The meaning of the term sacer in Ancient Roman religion is not fully congruent with the meaning it took after Christianization, and which was adopted into English as sacred. In early Roman religion sacer denotes anything "set apart" from common society and encompasses both the sense of "hallowed" and that of "cursed". The homo sacer could thus also simply mean a person expunged from society and deprived of all rights and all functions in civil religion.

A definition of homo sacer is found in Festus, who states 'homo sacer is est quem populus iudicavit ob maleficium; neque fas est eum immolari, sed qui occidit parricidi non damnatur'. Homo sacer is defined in legal terms as someone who can be killed without the killer being regarded as a murderer; and a person who cannot be sacrificed. The sacred human may thus be understood as someone outside the law, or beyond it. The term sacred man could also have been used because the condemned could only rely on protection of gods.

A direct reference to this status is found in the Twelve Tables (8.21), the laws of the early Roman Republic written in the fifth century BC. The paragraph states that a patron who deceives his clients is to be regarded as sacer.

The status of homo sacer could fall upon one as a consequence of oath-breaking. An oath in antiquity was essentially a conditional self-cursing, i.e. invoking one or more deities and asking for their punishment in the event of breaking the oath. An oathbreaker was consequently considered the property of the gods whom he had invoked and then deceived. If the oathbreaker was killed, this was understood as the revenge of the gods into whose power he had given himself. Since the oathbreaker was already the property of the oath deity, he could no longer belong to human society, or be consecrated to another deity.

== Related cultural concepts ==
The sense of the Latin adjective sacer both overlaps and also contrasts with the Hebrew concept of ḥērem,, "cursed, prohibited." That which is cherem, such as spoil taken in war, is dedicated to God and therefore sacred; but it is also accursed, so that if it is appropriated by a secular person, that person and even their family could become cherem and stoned to death.

The idea of an outlaw, a criminal declared as unprotected by the law who can consequently be killed by anyone with impunity, existed in various European legal systems in the Middle Ages.

== See also ==
- Proscription, a related Roman legal practice instituted by Sulla c. 82 BCE
- Burakumin, a similar practice in Japan
- Civil death, the loss of most or all civil rights as a punishment
- Dalit, the lowest caste in India
- Hostis humani generis, in admiralty law, a term for pirates and slavers which may be attacked by any nation
- Kafir, a term in Islam for someone who rejects God's authority
- Outcast (person), someone rejected by or excluded from society
- Stateless person, someone not considered a national by any state
- Persona non grata, someone whose diplomatic immunity has been revoked
- Unlawful combatant, category in United States law for attackers not regarded as protected by the Geneva Conventions
- Vogelfrei, a German person declared outside the protection of the law
