= Hölderlin's Madness =

2021 book by Giorgio Agamben

- Author: Giorgio Agamben
- Original title: La follia di Hölderlin
- Translator: Alta L. Price
- Language: Italian
- Subject: Friedrich Hölderlin
- Publisher: Giulio Einaudi Editore
- Publication date: 2021
- Publication place: Italy
- English publication date: 2023
- Pages: 248
- ISBN: 9788806248161

Hölderlin's Madness: Chronicle of a Dwelling Life 1806–1843 (Italian: La follia di Hölderlin. Cronaca di una follia abitante (1806–1843)) is a 2021 book by the Italian writer Giorgio Agamben. It is about the German poet Friedrich Hölderlin, focusing on the second half of his life, which he spent isolated in a tower in Tübingen. The book is a chronicle rather than a history book, which means it recounts what sources say without trying to verify their claims. Seagull Books published the English translation by Alta L. Price in 2023.
