= Caput lupinum =

Medieval English legal concept

Caput lupinum (lit. 'wolf's head') or caput gerat lupinum (transl. 'may he wear a wolfish head') are terms used in the English legal system and its derivatives. The terms were used in medieval England to designate a person pronounced by the authorities to be a dangerous criminal, who could thus be killed without penalty.

== Meaning ==
The Latin term caput lupinum literally means 'wolf's head' or 'wolfish head', and refers to a person considered to be an outlaw, as in the phrase caput gerat lupinum ('may he wear a wolfish head' or 'may his be a wolf's head'). Black's Law Dictionary, 8th edition reads "an outlawed felon considered a pariah – a lone wolf – open to attack by anyone".

== Use ==
Caput lupinum or caput gerat lupinum are used in the English legal system and its derivatives. The terms were used in medieval England to designate a person pronounced by the authorities to be a dangerous criminal whose rights had been waived, who could thus be legally harmed or killed without penalty by any citizen.

The term caput lupinum is first recorded in the text Leges Edwardi Confessoris as a law attributed to the 11th century ruler Edward the Confessor. This law stated that a man who refused to answer a summons from the king's justice for a criminal trial would be condemned as a caput lupinum.

The thirteenth-century writer on law, Henry de Bracton, wrote in his book De Legibus et Consuetudinibus Angliae that outlaws gerunt caput lupinum ('bear the wolf's head'). Bracton added that this meant that outlaws could thus be killed without judicial inquiry.

The fourteenth-century English legal textbook The Mirror of Justices stated that anyone who was accused of a felony, who refused three times to attend county courts, would be declared caput lupinum. The book added: "'Wolfshead!' shall be cried against him, for that a wolf is a beast hated of all folk; and from that time forward it is lawful for anyone to slay him like a wolf."
