= Taiwanese American Foundation =

Immigrant organization

Logo

The Taiwanese American Foundation (Chinese: 台美文教基金會) is an organization working in the Taiwanese immigrant community of the United States. The organization was established by Kenjohn Wang and his wife, emigrants from Taiwan to Long Beach, California, in 1982. Kenjohn Wang served as founding chairman.

Its main activity is a week-long summer camp for elementary schoolers through adults in the last week of July to the first week of August at a college campus (now a university), in the Midwest called Manchester College. It has five major programs for each of the age groups: Elementary School, Middle School, High School, and College (the groups are named Junior, Junior High, Youth, and TAFLabs or a counselor respectively). Each year, there is a theme that is cycled every four years, in this order: Leadership, Identity, Ethics and Values, and Communication.

== See also ==
- Taiwanese American Foundation of San Diego
