= Lo Tung-bin =

Taiwanese biochemist (1927–2019)

Lo Tung-bin (Chinese: 羅銅壁; pinyin: Luó Tóngbì; Wade–Giles: Lo T'ung-pi; 15 February 1927 – 13 May 2019), also known as T. B. Lo, was a Taiwanese biochemist. A pioneer in the research on proteins in Taiwan, he was elected an academician of Academia Sinica in 1986. He served as Dean of the College of Sciences of National Taiwan University and Vice President of Academia Sinica (1993–1996).

== Biography ==
Lo was born on 15 February 1927 in Puli, Nantou, Japanese Taiwan. After graduating from National Taiwan University (NTU), he studied at Tohoku University in Japan, earning his Ph.D. in chemistry in 1959.

Lo worked as an associate research fellow at the University of California, Berkeley, before returning to Taiwan to join the faculty of NTU. In 1972, on the invitation of Chien Shih-Liang, then president of Academia Sinica, he co-founded the Institute of Biological Chemistry, a joint venture of NTU and Academia Sinica, and served as its first director. Lo's teaching career teaching career at NTU spanned from 1964 to 1995.

A pioneer in the research on proteins in Taiwan, Lo was elected an academician of Academia Sinica in 1986. From 1978 to 1990 he served as Dean of the College of Sciences and then Dean of Academic Affairs at NTU. From 1993 to 1996, he served as Vice President of Academia Sinica. In January 2016, his memoir was published by the Institute of Modern History of Academia Sinica.

Lo died on 13 May 2019 in Taipei, at the age of 92.
