= Annan District =

District in Tainan, Taiwan

Coordinates: 23.0473013°N 120.1846813°E

Annan 安南區
- District
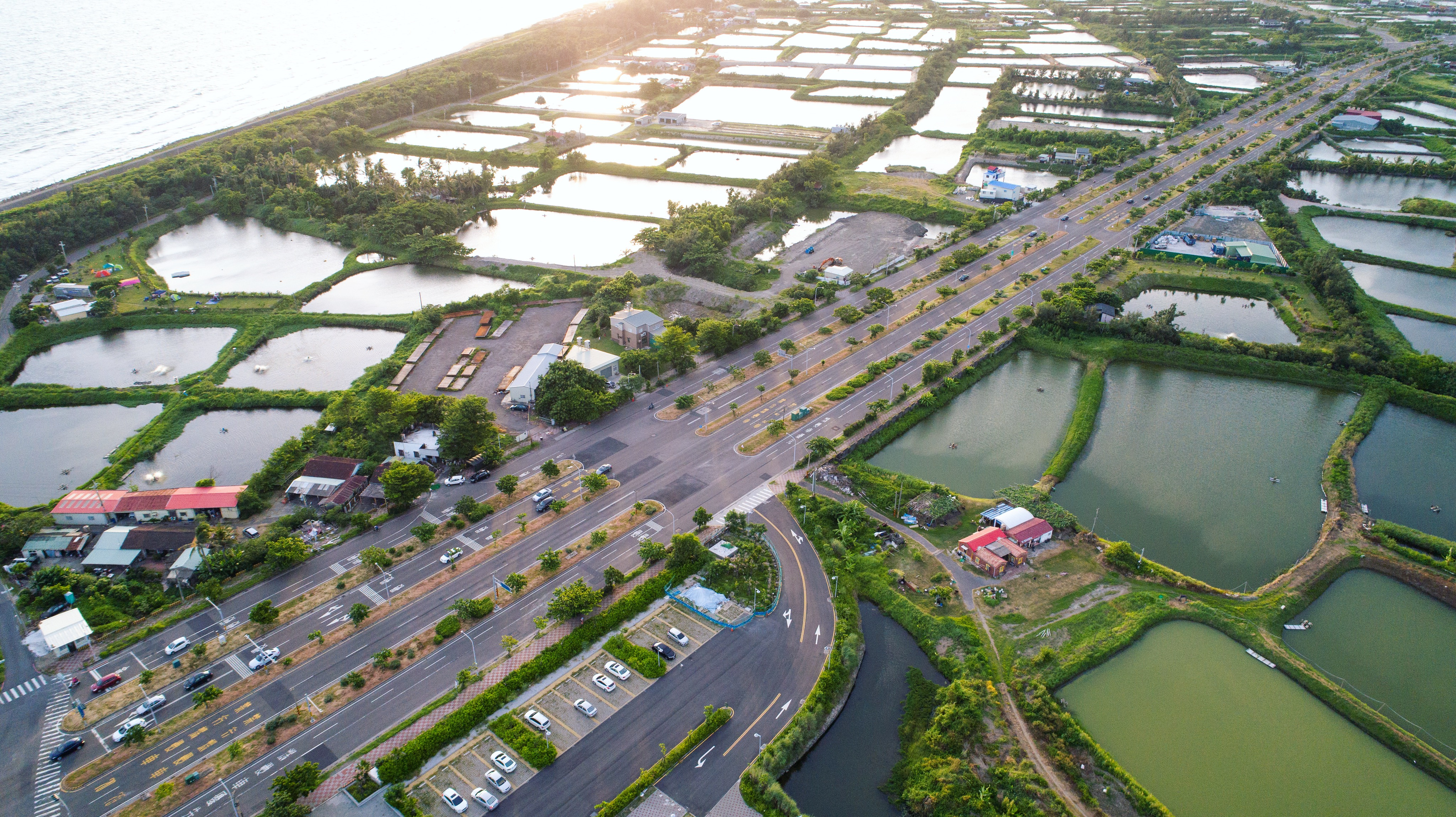
- Coastal landscape in Annan District

- Annan District in Tainan City
- Location: Tainan, Taiwan

Area
  - Total: 107 km^{2} (41 sq mi)

Population (January 2023)
  - Total: 199,502
  - Density: 1,860/km^{2} (4,830/sq mi)
- Website: www.annan.gov.tw/en/

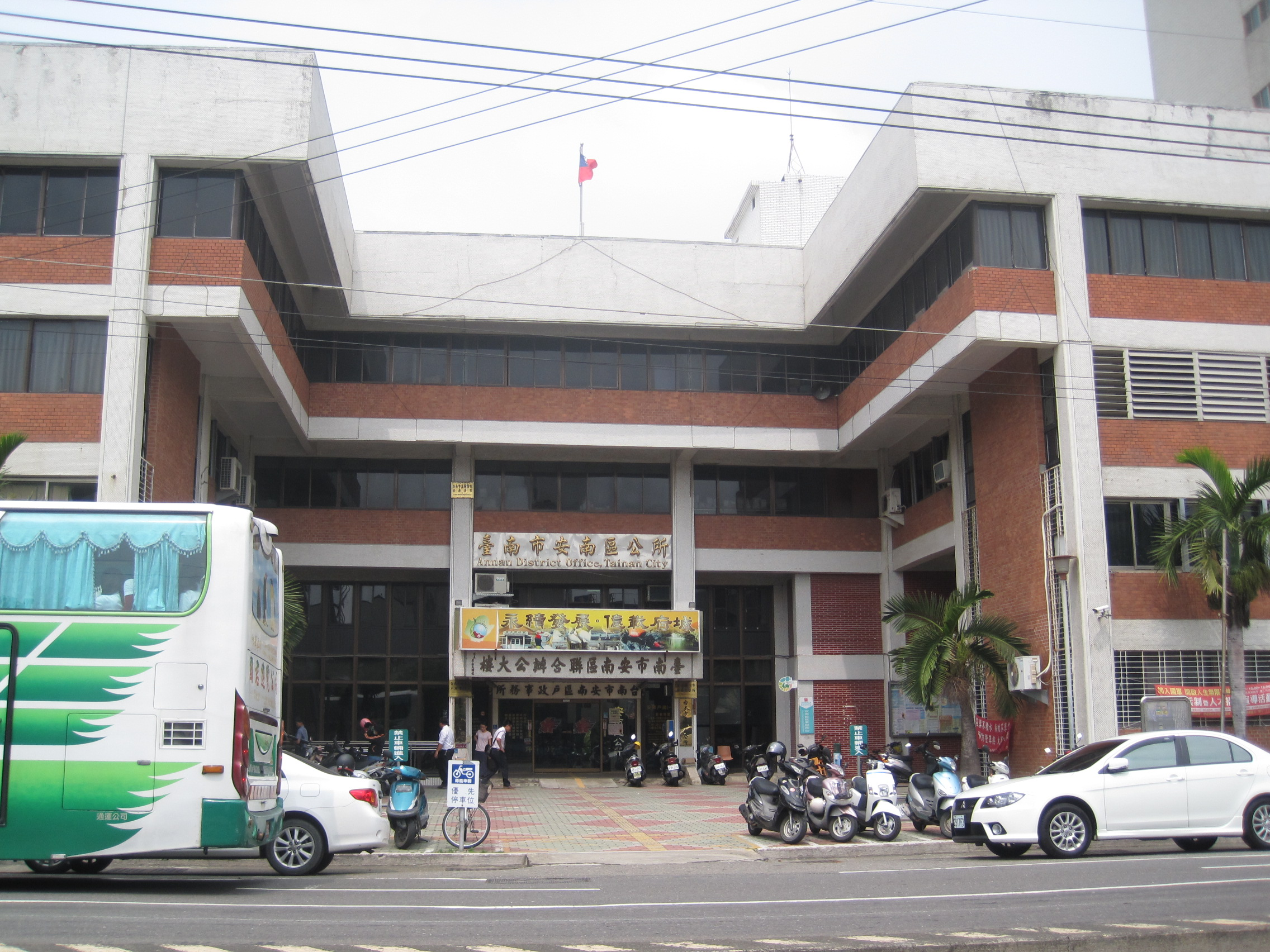
Annan District office

Annan District (Chinese: 安南區; pinyin: Ānnán Qū; Wade–Giles: An^{1}-Nan^{2} Ch'ü^{1}; Pe̍h-ōe-jī: An-Lâm-Khu) is a coastal district located in the west of Tainan, Taiwan.

== History ==
After the handover of Taiwan from Japan to the Republic of China in 1945, Anshun was organized as a rural township of Tainan County. In 1946, the township was incorporated into Tainan City and became Annan District.

== Geography ==
- Area: 107.20 km^{2}
- Population: 199,502 people (January 2023)

== Administrative divisions ==
The district consists of Tunghe, Anshun, Wennan, Zhounan, Zhoubei, Antung, Anx, Dingan, Anqing, Xinshun, Yuandian, Zongtou, Zhangan, Gongqin, Haitung, Haixi, Hainan, Xixin, Gongwen, Yuantung, Yuanxi, Diantung, Dianxi, Yantian, Nanxing, Xuetung, Chengtung, Chengbei, Chengzhong, Chengnan, Chengxi, Jingcao, Shalun, Xiangong, Luer, Sicao, Anhe, Xibei, Xiding, Xiqi, Haidian, Xingfu, Fenghuang, Meihua, Lixiang, Xitung, Yuanzhong, Budai, Guoan, Anfu and Daan Village.

== Education ==
- CTBC Business School
- University of Kang Ning

== Tourist attractions ==
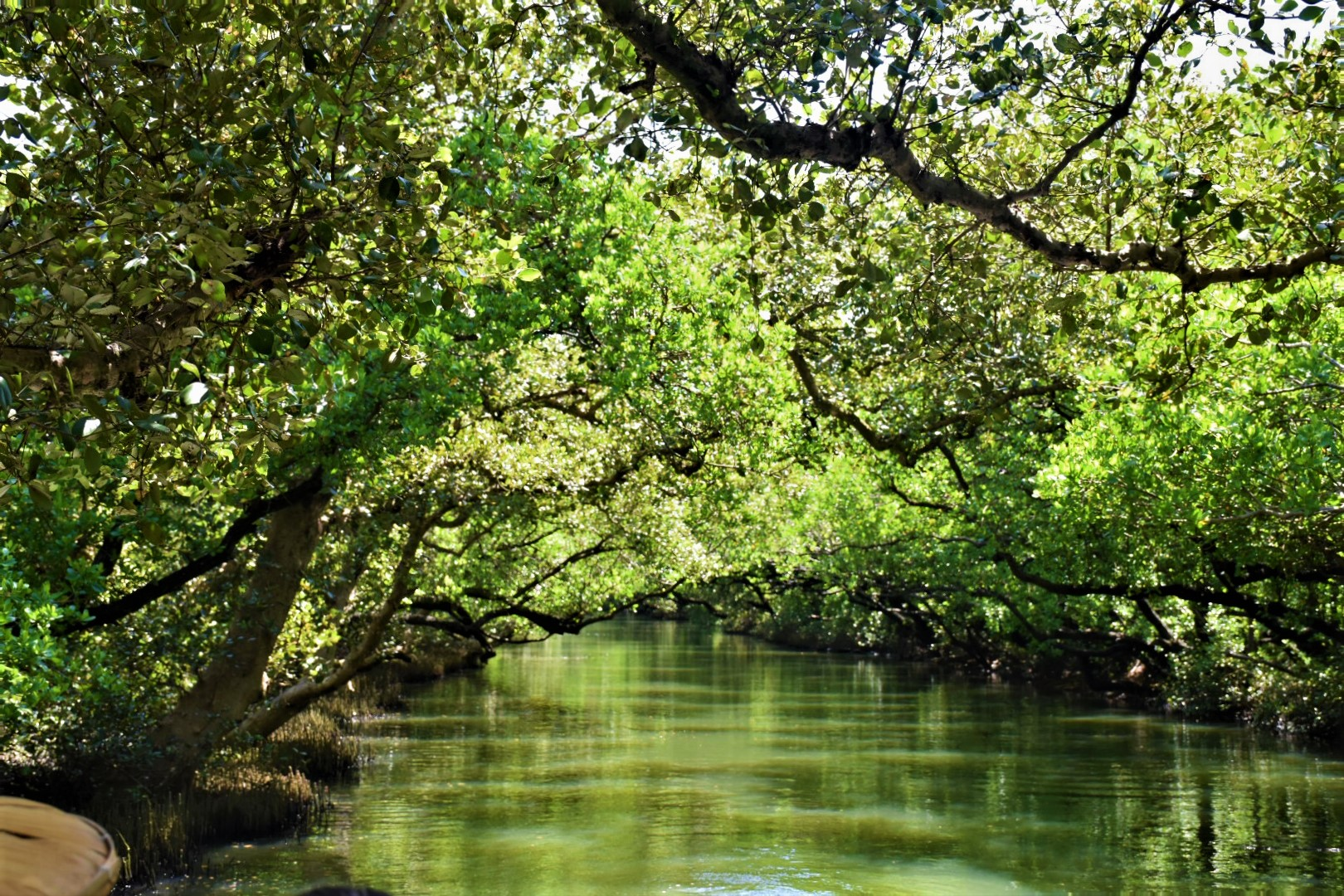
Sicao Wetlands in Taijiang National Park

- Luerhmen History and Culture Museum
- National Museum of Taiwan History
- Sicao Fortress
- Sicao Wetlands
- Southwest Coast National Scenic Area
- Taijiang National Park
- Taikang Cultural Center
- Zhongzhouliao Night Market
- Guozhai Night Market

== Transportation ==
Annan is the western terminus of National Freeway 8, and is also served by Provincial Highways 17, 17A, 17B (Taijing Boulevard), and 19. The district is also served by Sicao Boulevard, and Chengxi Street.

== Notable natives ==
- Shih Chih-ming, Mayor of Tainan (1989–1997)

== See also ==
- Tainan
