= Tsai Ying-wen (political scientist) =

Taiwanese political scientist (1952–2019)

- 蔡英文
- Born: 4 June 1952; Taipei County, Taiwan
- Died: 10 October 2019 (aged 67)
- Education: Tunghai University (BA); University of York (PhD)
- Occupations: Political scientist, translator

Tsai Ying-wen (Chinese: 蔡英文; pinyin: Cài Yīngwēn; Wade–Giles: Tsai Ÿing-wën; Pe̍h-ōe-jī: Chhòa Eng-bûn; 4 June 1952 – 10 October 2019) was a Taiwanese political scientist and translator. He was a research fellow at Academia Sinica, with his main research focus on the history of Western political thought. His book, From Monarchy and Autocracy to Democracy, won Academia Sinica's 5th Academic Book Award in Humanities and Social Sciences in 2016.

== Biography ==
Tsai was born on 4 June 1952 in Taipei County, Taiwan (Now New Taipei). He graduated from the Department of History of Tunghai University, and later obtained a Ph.D. in political science from the University of York in the United Kingdom. He was a research fellow at Academia Sinica, and was a visiting scholar at the University of Cambridge. His main research area was the history of Western political thought.

Tsai was one of the first scholars to introduce the political theories of Hannah Arendt to the Chinese-speaking world. He translated the second section (imperialism) and the third section (totalitarianism) of Arendt's influential work The Origins of Totalitarianism into Chinese. He compared Arendt's theories to those of Carl Schmitt, and was one of the first to introduce Italian scholar Giorgio Agamben's state of exception concepts to Chinese speakers.

In December 2016, Tsai's 2015 book, From Monarchy and Autocracy to Democracy: The Development of Western Democratic Thoughts and Its Problems (從王權、專制到民主：西方民主思想的開展及其問題), won Academia Sinica's 5th Academic Book Award in Humanities and Social Sciences. At the award ceremony, he mentioned that his "obscure" academic work had sold well and was reprinted within three months of publication, and jokingly said that most readers must have mistaken the book's author as President Tsai Ing-wen.

On 10 October 2019, Tsai died from infections caused by gastroesophageal reflux disease, aged 67.

== Namesake ==
As Tsai shared the same Chinese name as the Republic of China President Tsai Ing-wen, his works were often mistakenly attributed to her. On 19 January 2016, after Tsai Ing-wen won the Taiwan presidential election, Hong Kong political commentator Lin Hsing-chih wrote a column stating that she, as the translator of Quentin Skinner's book on Niccolò Machiavelli, would be well-versed in Machiavellian tactics. On 31 January, Yazhou Zhoukan published an article pointing out that the book was translated by the political scientist Tsai Ying-wen in 1983, not by the president-elect.

== Selected works ==
- From Monarchy and Autocracy to Democracy (從王權、專制到民主：西方民主思想的開展及其問題), 2015, ISBN 9789570846515.
- Contemporary Political Thought (當代政治思潮), 2009, ISBN 9789571452012.
- Sovereign State and Civil Society (主權國家與市民社會), 2006, ISBN 7301105339.
- Political Practice and Public Space (政治實踐與公共空間), 2002, ISBN 9570823038.
- Han Fei's Thought of Rule of Law and Its Historical Significance (韓非的法治思想及其歷史意義), 1987, ISBN 9789575473457.
