= Taiwanese American Foundation of San Diego =

The Taiwanese American Foundation of San Diego is an organization for people of Taiwanese descent in the San Diego, California area.

== History ==
The Taiwanese American Foundation of San Diego (TAFSD) was founded in 1996 with the dedication and commitment of the Taiwanese American Community in San Diego. TAFSD is incorporated in the State of California as a nonprofit, public, and charitable organization. Donations to TAFSD are tax deductible. The Taiwanese American Community Center (TACC) is an operational unit of TAFSD.
