= What Is Philosophy? (Heidegger book) =

Book by Martin Heidegger

- Cover of the first edition
- Author: Martin Heidegger
- Original title: Was ist das - die Philosophie
- Language: German
- Subjects: Thought, Ontology
- Publisher: 1956: Günther Neske
- Publication date: 1956
- Publication place: Germany
- English publication date: 1958; New Haven, College and University Press (Twayne Publishers)
- ISBN: 978-0808403197

What Is Philosophy? (German: Was ist das - die Philosophie) is a book by the philosopher Martin Heidegger. It is the published version of a lecture course he gave at Cerisy-la-Salle in 1955. It was translated into English by William Kluback and Jean T. Wilde.

== See also ==
- Metaphilosophy
