= Taikang Cultural Center =

Cultural center in Annan, Tainan, Taiwan

- 台江文化中心
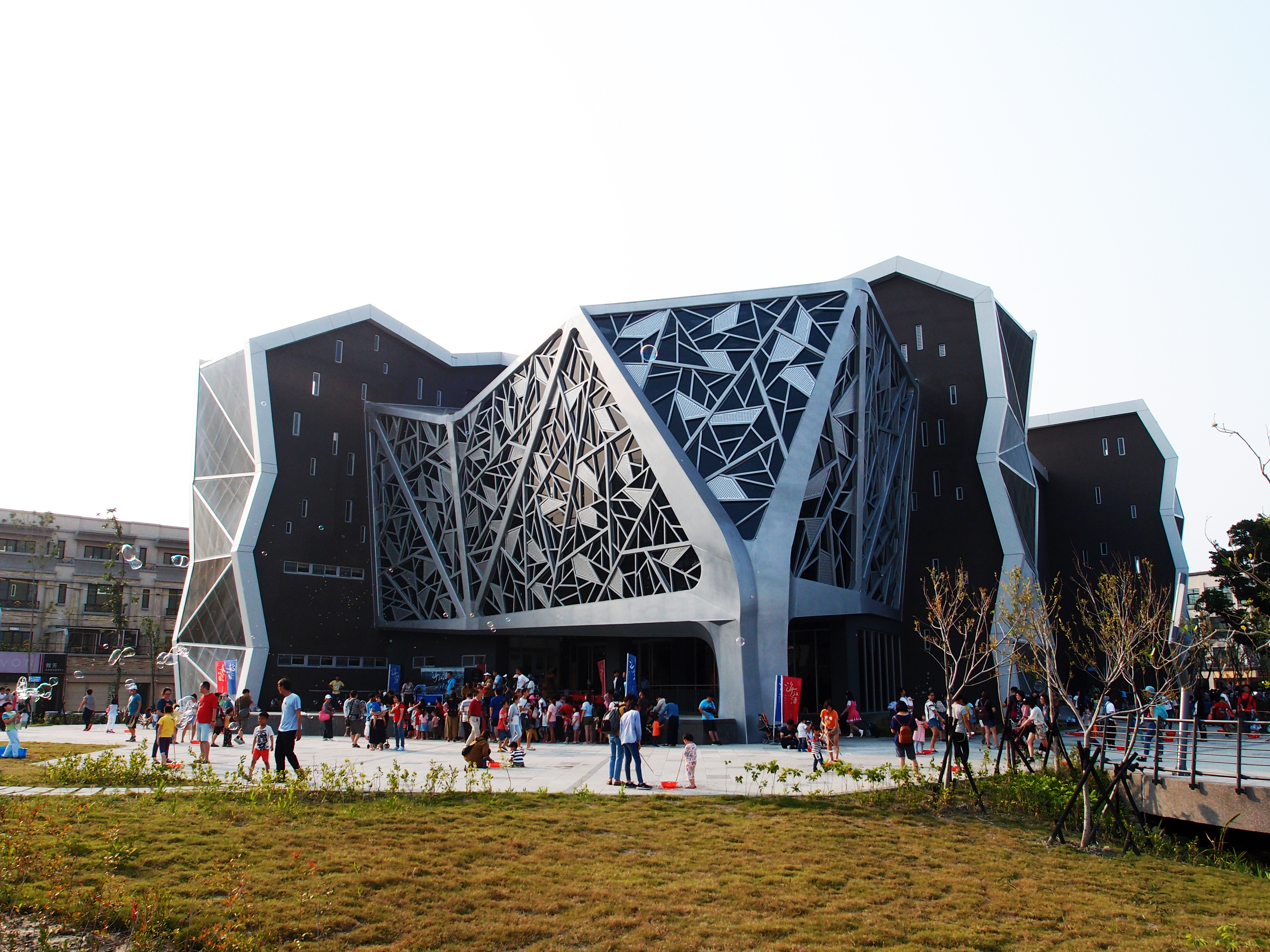
- Interactive map of the Taikang Cultural Center area
- Alternative names: Taijiang Cultural Center

General information
- Type: cultural center
- Location: Annan, Tainan, Taiwan
- Coordinates: 23°02′45.2″N 120°11′16.6″E
- Construction started: December 2015
- Opened: January 2019
- Inaugurated: April 2019

Technical details
- Floor count: 5
- Floor area: 1.6 hectares

Design and construction
- Architect: S.T. YEH Architects

Website
- Official website

The Taikang Cultural Center or Taijiang Cultural Center (traditional Chinese: 臺江文化中心; simplified Chinese: 台江文化中心; pinyin: Táijiāng Wénhuà Zhōngxīn) is a cultural center in Annan District, Tainan, Taiwan.

== History ==
In 2004, the Taikang Culture Promotion Society asked for a building of Taikang Cultural Park which was located on public land. In 2005, the Cultural Affairs Bureau of Tainan County Government started planning to establish the Taikang Cultural Center. However, it faced difficulties in acquiring the land which resulted in the plan to be halted several times over the years.

The construction of the cultural center finally began in December 2015. The soft opening for the center was held by Tainan City Government in January 2019, and it was officially opened in April 2019.

== Architecture ==
The cultural center building spans over a floor area of 1.6 hectares with four floors above ground and one underground. It has a capacity of 600 people. It consists of a performance hall, a library and a community college. There are two main buildings of the center which are the theater building and the classroom building. The theater building consists of four floors above ground and one basement floor. The classroom building consists of three floors above ground and one basement floor with two standard classrooms and four specialized classrooms. The basement floor is dedicated to the library which consists of audio visual room, printed materials section and office space.

== See also ==
- List of tourist attractions in Taiwan
