= Ching-Liang Lin =

Taiwanese physicist and professor (1931–2019)

- 林清凉
- Born: 22 January 1931; Okayama, Okayama, Takao Prefecture, Taiwan, Empire of Japan (today Gangshan District, Kaohsiung, Taiwan)
- Died: 18 November 2019 (aged 88); Zhongzheng District, Taipei, Taiwan
- Education: National Taiwan University (BS); University of Tokyo (PhD)
- Occupation: Physicist
- Employer: National Taiwan University

Ching-Liang Lin (Chinese: 林清凉; 22 January 1931 – 18 November 2019) was a Taiwanese physicist and professor at National Taiwan University. She was the first woman to be head of the university's department of physics.

== Life ==
Lin was born in 1931 in Takao Prefecture (present-day Kaoshiung). She graduated from Kaohsiung Municipal Kaohsiung Girls' Senior High School, then attended National Taiwan University (NTU), where she earned her bachelor's degree in physics. She was a witness to the February 28 incident in 1947 which killed thousands in Taiwan and resulted in decades of martial law known as the White Terror.

After graduating from National Taiwan University, Lin attended the University of Tokyo and obtained her Ph.D. in physics in 1966. She returned to Taiwan in 1970 and was asked to create a physics department at Soochow University. She married another academic, Feng Tsuan Hua, around 1972 and they left for a couple of years to work in Massachusetts in the United States at the University of Massachusetts, Amherst.

She became a professor of physics at the National Taiwan University. From 1981 to 1983 she was the head of the department of physics at the university. Whilst she was in charge, she arranged an audit of the department, and it was found that a radioactive source that was meant to be stored safely was missing. The newspapers reported the problem, and it was only when national bodies became involved that the radium - beryllium neutron source was found. She wanted to concentrate on teaching, so she stood down from her management role. She continued to teach for twenty years, and she was cited as a role model for other women to study physics.

She retired and died in 2019 at National Taiwan University Hospital.

== Selected works ==
- Theory of Two Nucleon Stripping Reactions. I—(d, α) and (α, d) Reactions—, 1964
- Prog. Theor. Phys.vol 36 (1966) p. 251287. Theory of Two-Nucleon Transfer Reaction II.
- CL Lin, S. Yamaji and H. Yosbida: Nucl. Phys. Vol.A204 (1973) p. 135152. Finite Range Calculations of the Two-Nucleon Transfer Reactions.
- FJ Kline, CL Lin and GA Peterson: Nucl. Phys. vol.A241 (1975) p. 299310. Inelastic Electron Scattering from 31p.
- CL Lin and Kuo-Ping Li: Prog. Theor. Phys. vol. 81 (1989) p. 140159. Nuclear Exchange Currents in Quantum Hadrodynamics.

In addition she has a large number of patents in her name.
