= Custom of the sea =

Informal maritime traditions and practices

A custom of the sea is a custom said to be practiced by the officers and crew of ships and boats in the open sea, as distinguished from maritime law, which is a distinct and coherent body of law governing maritime questions and offenses.

Traditional customs include:

- Cannibalism at sea – once widely considered acceptable as a last resort after shipwrecks, provided that lots were drawn to decide who would be sacrificed to feed the other survivors
- Captain goes down with the ship – the expectancy that in case of disasters the captain will stay on board until everybody else is rescued, or die in the attempt
- Flag dipping – briefly lowering a ship's flag as a salute or sign of respect
- Man overboard – exclamation given to indicate that a person has fallen off the ship and is in need of immediate rescue
- Women and children first – an unofficial code of conduct whereby the lives of women and children are saved first in a life-threatening situation
