= Emperor Yingwen =

Emperor Yingwen may refer to:

- Emperor Shenzong of Western Xia (1163–1226)
- Ögedei Khan (c. 1186–1241)
