= Giorgio Agamben =

Italian philosopher (born 1942)

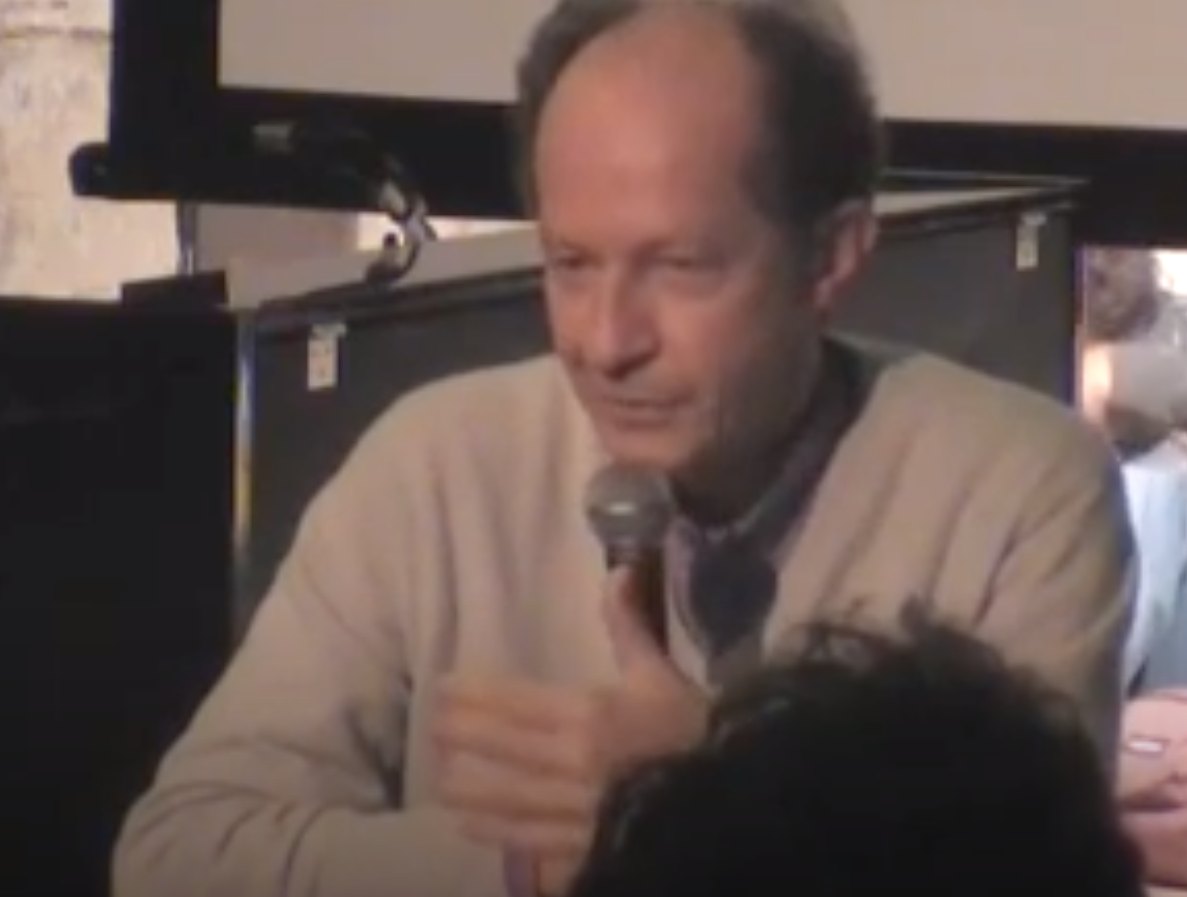
- In 2009, during the presentation of Contributions à la guerre en cours
- Born: 22 April 1942 (age 84); Rome, Kingdom of Italy

Education
- Education: Sapienza University of Rome (Laurea, 1965)
- Academic advisor: Martin Heidegger

Philosophical work
- Era: Contemporary philosophy
- Region: Western philosophy
- School: Continental philosophy Philosophy of life
- Institutions: University of Verona; University of Macerata; University of Palermo; Università Iuav di Venezia
- Main interests: Aesthetics; Political philosophy Social philosophy
- Notable ideas: Homo sacer State of exception Whatever singularity Bare life Auctoritas; Form-of-life; The zoe–bios distinction as the "fundamental categorial pair of Western politics" The paradox of sovereignty Destituent power

Giorgio Agamben (/əˈɡæmbən/ ə-GAM-bən; Italian: [ˈdʒordʒo aˈɡamben]; born 22 April 1942) is an Italian philosopher whose work spans political theory, ontology, aesthetics, and literature. He is best known for developing the concept of homo sacer and exploring the relationship between sovereignty, legal authority, and what he calls 'bare life'. His writings draw on sources including Aristotle, Roman law, Christian theology, Martin Heidegger, Walter Benjamin, Ludwig Wittgenstein, St. Augustine and Carl Schmitt among others, and engage critically with Michel Foucault’s account of biopolitics and biopower. Agamben’s multi-volume Homo Sacer project has been widely discussed within political philosophy, jurisprudence, anthropology, and the humanities, and he is considered one of the most influential writers in contemporary continental philosophy.

Agamben has held teaching and research positions at institutions including the University of Verona, the University of Macerata, the University of Palermo, and the Università Iuav di Venezia, and he has lectured widely in Europe and North America. His publications include Homo Sacer: Sovereign Power and Bare Life (1995), State of Exception (2003), The Kingdom and the Glory (2007), and The Use of Bodies (2014), alongside works on language, poetry, and the history of Western metaphysics. His ideas have generated substantial scholarly debate and have influenced fields ranging from political theory to literary studies.

Agamben’s theoretical concerns have intersected with contemporary political controversies. In 2004, he refused to travel to the United States after new visa regulations required biometric fingerprinting, which he likened to practices of bodily registration used in twentieth century totalitarian regimes. During the COVID-19 pandemic, he criticised the Italian government’s lockdowns, mask requirements, and vaccination passes as examples of an expanded state of exception that, in his view, reduced political life to biological management. These interventions attracted significant criticism from public health experts and fellow philosophers, many of whom argued that Agamben misapplied his earlier work to a public-health emergency, though others supported his analysis.

== Biography ==
Agamben was educated at the University of Rome, where in 1965 he wrote an unpublished laurea thesis on the political thought of Simone Weil. Agamben participated in Martin Heidegger's Le Thor seminars (on Heraclitus and Hegel) in 1966 and 1968. In the 1970s, he worked primarily on linguistics, philology, poetics, and topics in medieval culture. During this period, Agamben began to elaborate his primary concerns, although their political bearings were not yet made explicit. In 1974–1975, he was a fellow at the Warburg Institute, University of London, due to the courtesy of Frances Yates, whom he met through Italo Calvino. During this fellowship, Agamben began to develop his second book, Stanzas (1977).

Agamben was close to the poets Giorgio Caproni and José Bergamín, as well as the Italian novelist Elsa Morante (on whose works the essays "The Celebration of the Hidden Treasure" and "Parody" were focused). He has been a friend and collaborator to such intellectuals as Pier Paolo Pasolini (in whose The Gospel According to St. Matthew he played the part of Philip), Italo Calvino (with whom he briefly collaborated as advisor to the publishing house Einaudi and developed plans for a journal), Ingeborg Bachmann, Pierre Klossowski, Guy Debord, Jean-Luc Nancy, Jacques Derrida, Antonio Negri, and Jean-François Lyotard (among others).

His strongest influences include Martin Heidegger, Walter Benjamin and Michel Foucault. Agamben edited Benjamin's collected works in Italian translation until 1996, and called Benjamin's thought "the antidote that allowed me to survive Heidegger". In 1981, Agamben discovered several important lost manuscripts by Benjamin in the archives of the Bibliothèque nationale de France. Benjamin had left these manuscripts to Georges Bataille when he fled Paris shortly before his death. The most relevant of these to Agamben's own later work were Benjamin's manuscripts for his thesis On the Concept of History. Agamben has engaged since the nineties in a debate with the political writings of the German jurist Carl Schmitt, most extensively in the study State of Exception (2003). His recent writings also elaborate on the concepts of Michel Foucault, whom he calls "a scholar from whom I have learned a great deal in recent years".

Agamben's political thought was founded on his readings of Aristotle's Politics, Nicomachean Ethics, and treatise On the Soul, as well as the exegetical traditions concerning these texts in late antiquity and the Middle Ages. In his later work, Agamben intervenes in the theoretical debates following the publication of Nancy's essay La communauté désoeuvrée (1983), and Maurice Blanchot's response, La communauté inavouable (1983). These texts analyzed the notion of community at a time when the European Community was under debate. Agamben proposed his own model of a community which would not presuppose categories of identity in The Coming Community (1990). At this time, Agamben also analyzed the ontological condition and "political" attitude of Bartleby (from Herman Melville's short story) – a scrivener who "prefers not" to write.

Currently, Agamben teaches at the Accademia di Architettura di Mendrisio (Università della Svizzera Italiana) and has taught at the Università IUAV di Venezia, the Collège international de philosophie in Paris, and the European Graduate School in Saas-Fee, Switzerland; he previously taught at the University of Macerata and at the University of Verona, both in Italy. He also has held visiting appointments at several American universities, from the University of California, Berkeley, to Northwestern University, and at Heinrich Heine University Düsseldorf. Agamben received the Prix Européen de l'Essai Charles Veillon in 2006.

In 2013 he was awarded the Dr. Leopold Lucas Prize by the University of Tübingen for his work titled Leviathans Rätsel (Leviathan's Riddle, translated into English by Paul Silas Peterson).

== Work ==
Much of Agamben's work since the 1980s can be viewed as leading up to the so-called Homo Sacer project, which properly begins with the book Homo Sacer: Sovereign Power and Bare Life. In this series of works, Agamben responds to Hannah Arendt's and Foucault's studies of totalitarianism and biopolitics. Since 1995, he has been best known for this ongoing project, the volumes of which have been published out of order, and which include:

- Homo Sacer: Sovereign Power and Bare Life (1995)
- State of Exception. Homo Sacer II, 1 (2003)
- Stasis: Civil War as a Political Paradigm. Homo Sacer II, 2 (2015)
- The Sacrament of Language: An Archaeology of the Oath. Homo Sacer II, 3 (2008)
- The Kingdom and the Glory: For a Theological Genealogy of Economy and Government. Homo Sacer II, 4 (2007)
- Opus Dei: An Archeology of Duty. Homo Sacer II, 5 (2013)
- Remnants of Auschwitz: The Witness and the Archive. Homo Sacer III (1998).
- The Highest Poverty: Monastic Rules and Forms-of-Life. Homo Sacer IV, 1 (2013)
- The Use of Bodies. Homo Sacer IV, 2 (2016)

In 2017, these works were collected and published as The Omnibus Homo Sacer.

In the final volume of the series, Agamben intends to address "the concepts of forms-of-life and lifestyles." "What I call a form-of-life," he explains, "is a life which can never be separated from its form, a life in which it is never possible to separate something like bare life. […] [H]ere too the concept of privacy comes in to play."

If human beings were or had to be this or that substance, this or that destiny, no ethical experience would be possible… This does not mean, however, that humans are not, and do not have to be, something, that they are simply consigned to nothingness and therefore can freely decide whether to be or not to be, to adopt or not to adopt this or that destiny (nihilism and decisionism coincide at this point). There is in effect something that humans are and have to be, but this is not an essence nor properly a thing: It is the simple fact of one's own existence as possibility or potentiality…

— Giorgio Agamben, The Coming Community (1993), section 11.

The reduction of life to 'biopolitics' is one of the main threads in Agamben's work, in his critical conception of a homo sacer, reduced to 'bare life', and thus deprived of any rights. Agamben's concept of the homo sacer rests on a crucial distinction in Greek between "bare life" (la vita nuda or zoê /ˈzoʊi/; Gk. ζωή zoê) and "a particular mode of life" or "qualified life" (bios UK: /ˈbaɪɒs/, US: /-oʊs/; Gk. βίος bios). In Part III, section 7 of Homo Sacer, "The Camp as the 'Nomos' of the Modern", he evokes the concentration camps of World War II. "The camp is the space that is opened when the state of exception begins to become the rule." Agamben says that "What happened in the camps so exceeds (is outside of) the juridical concept of crime that the specific juridico-political structure in which those events took place is often simply omitted from consideration." The conditions in the camps were "conditio inhumana," and the incarcerated were somehow defined outside the boundaries of humanity, under the exception laws of Schutzhaft. Where law is based on vague, unspecific concepts such as "race" or "good morals," law and the personal subjectivity of the judicial agent are no longer distinct.

In the process of creating a state of exception, these effects can compound. In a realized state of exception, one who has been accused of committing a crime, within the legal system, loses the ability to use his/her voice and represent themselves. The individual can not only be deprived of their citizenship, but also of any form of agency over their own life. "Agamben identifies the state of exception with the power of decision over life."

Within the state of exception, the distinction between bios (the life of the citizen) and zoê (the life of homo sacer) is made by those with judicial power. For example, Agamben would argue that Guantánamo Bay exemplifies the concept of 'the state of exception' in the United States following 9/11. "The situation of the prisoners in Guantanamo is legally speaking really comparable with the Nazi camps. The Guantanamo detainees do not have the status of prisoners of war; they have no legal status at all. They are subject to mere factual domination, and have no legal existence".

Agamben mentions that basic universal human rights of Taliban individuals, while captured in Afghanistan and sent to Guantánamo Bay in 2001, were negated by US laws. In reaction to the removal of their basic human rights, detainees of Guantánamo Bay prison went on hunger strikes. Within a state of exception, when a detainee is placed outside the law, he or she is, according to Agamben, reduced to "bare life" in the eyes of the judicial powers. Here, one can see why such measures as hunger strikes can occur in such places as prisons. Within the framework of a system that has deprived the individual of power and their individual basic human freedoms, the hunger strike can be seen as a weapon or form of resistance. "The body is a model which can stand for any bounded system. Its boundaries can represent any boundaries which are threatened or precarious." Within a state of exception the boundaries of power are precarious and threaten to destabilize not only the law, but one's humanity, as well as their choice of life or death. Forms of resistance to the extended use of power within the state of exception, as suggested in Guantánamo Bay prison, also operate outside the law. In the case of the hunger strike, the prisoners were threatened and endured force feeding, not allowing them to die. During the hunger strikes at Guantánamo Bay prison, accusations and founded claims of forced feedings began to surface in the autumn of 2005. In February 2006, The New York Times reported that prisoners were being force fed in Guantánamo Bay prison and in March 2006, more than 250 medical experts, as reported by the BBC, voiced their opinions of the forced feedings stating that this was a breach of the government's power and was against the rights of the prisoners.

=== The Coming Community (1993) ===
In The Coming Community, published in 1990 and translated by longtime admirer Michael Hardt in 1993, Agamben describes the social and political manifestation of his philosophical thought. Employing diverse short essays he describes the nature of "whatever singularity" as that which has an "inessential commonality, a solidarity that in no way concerns an essence". His understanding of "whatever" not as being indifference but based on the Latin quodlibet ens translated as "being such that it always matters".

Agamben starts off by describing the "lovable":

Love is never directed toward this or that property of the loved one (being blond, being small, being tender, being lame), but neither does it neglect the properties in favor of an insipid generality (universal love): The lover wants the loved one with all of its predicates, its being such as it is.

— Giorgio Agamben, The Coming Community

Similarly, Agamben discusses "ease" as the “place” of love, or more precisely, love as the encounter with a unique moment (“love as the experience of taking-place in a whatever singularity"), which resonates with his utilization of the concept of "use" in his later writings.

In this sense, ease names perfectly that "free use of the proper" that, according to an expression of Friedrich Hölderlin's, is "the most difficult task."

— Giorgio Agamben, The Coming Community

Following the same trend, he employs, among others, the following to describe the "watershed of whatever":

- Example – particular and universal
- Limbo – blessed and damned
- Homonym – concept and idea
- Halo – potentiality and actuality
- Face – common and proper, genus and individual
- Threshold – inside and outside
- Coming community – state and non-state (humanity)

Other themes addressed in The Coming Community include the commodification of the body, evil, and the messianic.

Unlike other continental philosophers, he does not reject the dichotomies of subject/object and potentiality/actuality outright, but rather turns them inside-out, pointing out the zone where they become indistinguishable.

Matter that does not remain beneath form, but surrounds it with a halo.

— Giorgio Agamben, The Coming Community

The political task of humanity, he argues, is to expose the innate potential in this zone of indistinguishability. And although criticised as dreaming the impossible by certain authors, he nonetheless shows a concrete example of whatever singularity acting politically:

Whatever singularity, which wants to appropriate belonging itself, its own being-in-language, and thus rejects all identity and every condition of belonging, is the principal enemy of the State. Wherever these singularities peacefully demonstrate their being in common there will be Tiananmen, and, sooner or later, the tanks will appear.

— Giorgio Agamben, The Coming Community

=== Homo Sacer: Sovereign Power and Bare Life (1998) ===
In his main work "Homo Sacer: Sovereign Power and Bare Life" (1998), Agamben analyzes an obscure figure of Roman law that poses fundamental questions about the nature of law and power in general. Under the laws of the Roman Empire, a man who committed a certain kind of crime was banned from society, and all of his rights as a citizen were revoked. He thus became a "homo sacer" (sacred man). In consequence, he could be killed by anybody, while his life, on the other hand, was deemed "sacred", so he could not be sacrificed in a ritual ceremony.

Although Roman law no longer applied to someone deemed a Homo sacer, they remained "under the spell" of law. This means that "human life" is "included in the juridical order solely in the form of its exclusion (that is, of its capacity to be killed)". Homo sacer was therefore both excluded from law and included at the same time. This paradoxical figure of homo sacer is the exact mirror image of the sovereign (basileus) – a king, emperor, or president – who stands, on the one hand, within law (so he can be condemned, e.g., for treason, as a natural person) and outside the law (since as a body politic he has power to suspend law for an indefinite time).

Agamben draws on Carl Schmitt's definition of the Sovereign as the one who has the power to decide the state of exception (or justitium), where law is indefinitely "suspended" without being abrogated.

Agamben argues that laws have always assumed the authority to define "bare life" – zoe, as opposed to bios, or 'qualified life' – by making this exclusive operation, while at the same time gaining power over it by making it the subject of political control. The power of law to actively separate "political" beings (citizens) from "bare life" (bodies) has carried on from Antiquity to Modernity – literally from Aristotle to Auschwitz. Aristotle, as Agamben notes, constitutes political life via a simultaneous inclusion and exclusion of "bare life": as Aristotle says, man is an animal born to life (Gk. ζῆν, zen), but existing with regard to the good life (εὖ ζῆν, eu zen) which can be achieved through politics. Bare life, in this ancient conception of politics, is that which must be transformed, via the State, into the "good life"; that is, bare life is that which is supposedly excluded from the higher aims of the state, yet is included precisely so that it may be transformed into this "good life". Sovereignty, then, is conceived from ancient times as the power which determines what or who is to be incorporated into the political body (in accord with its bios) by means of the more originary exclusion (or exception) of what is to remain outside the political body—which is at the same time the source of that body's composition (zoe). According to Agamben, biopower, which takes the bare lives of the citizens into its political calculations, may be more marked in the modern state, but has essentially existed since the beginnings of sovereignty in the West, since this structure of ex-ception is essential to the core concept of sovereignty.

=== State of Exception (2005) ===
In this book, Agamben traces the concept of "state of exception" (Ausnahmezustand) used by Carl Schmitt to Roman justitium and auctoritas. This leads him to a response to Carl Schmitt's definition of sovereignty as the power to proclaim the exception.

Agamben's text State of Exception investigates the increase of power by governments which they employ in supposed times of crisis. Within a state of emergency, Agamben refers to the states of exception, where constitutional rights can be diminished, superseded and rejected in the process of claiming this extension of power by a government.

The state of exception invests one person or government with the power and voice of authority over others extended well beyond where the law has existed in the past. "In every case, the state of exception marks a threshold at which logic and praxis blur with each other and a pure violence without logos claims to realize an enunciation without any real reference" (Agamben, pg 40). Agamben refers to a continued state of exception to the Nazi state of Germany under Hitler's rule. "The entire Third Reich can be considered a state of exception that lasted twelve years. In this sense, modern totalitarianism can be defined as the establishment, by means of the state of exception, of a legal civil war that allows for the physical elimination not only of political adversaries but of entire categories of citizens who for some reason cannot be integrated into the political system" (Agamben, p. 2).

The political power over others acquired through the state of exception places one government—or one form or branch of government—as all-powerful, operating outside the laws. During such times of extension of power, certain forms of knowledge shall be privileged and accepted as true, and certain voices shall be heard as valued, while, of course, many others are not. This oppressive distinction holds great importance in relation to the production of knowledge. The process of both acquiring knowledge and suppressing certain knowledge is a violent act within a time of crisis.

Agamben's State of Exception investigates how the suspension of laws within a state of emergency or crisis can become a prolonged state of being. More specifically, Agamben addresses how this prolonged state of exception operates to deprive individuals of their citizenship. When speaking about the military order issued by President George W. Bush on 13 November 2001, Agamben writes, "What is new about President Bush's order is that it radically erases any legal status of the individual, thus producing a legally unnameable and unclassifiable being. Not only do the Taliban captured in Afghanistan not enjoy the status of POW's (prisoner of war) as defined by the Geneva Convention, they do not even have the status of people charged with a crime according to American laws" (Agamben, pg 3). Taliban and Al-Qaeda fighters in Afghanistan were held at Guantánamo Bay without trial. These individuals were termed "enemy combatants." Until 7 July 2006, these individuals had been treated outside the Geneva Conventions by the United States administration.

==== Auctoritas, "charisma" and Führertum doctrine ====
Agamben shows that auctoritas and potestas are clearly distinct – although they form together a binary system". He quotes Mommsen, who explains that auctoritas is "less than an order and more than an advice".

While potestas derives from social function, auctoritas "immediately derives from the patres personal condition". As such, it is akin to Max Weber's concept of charisma. This is why the tradition ordered, at the king's death, the creation of the sovereign's wax-double in the funus imaginarium, as Ernst Kantorowicz demonstrated in The King's Two Bodies (1957). Hence, it is necessary to distinguish two bodies of the sovereign in order to assure the continuity of dignitas (term used by Kantorowicz, here a synonym of auctoritas). Moreover, in the person detaining auctoritas—the sovereign—public life and private life have become inseparable. Augustus, the first Roman emperor who claimed auctoritas as the basis of princeps status in a famous passage of Res Gestae, had opened up his house to public eyes. In his theorization of thanatopolitics (the politics of death), Agamben uses the English and Roman examples to show how the sovereign justifies authority by his claimed ability to control or manage his own death. Agamben writes that the rituals of two deaths by the sovereign (as an ordinary human and then as effigy) demonstrate that death rituals show the people that the sovereign is in control of both lives.

The concept of auctoritas played a key role in fascism and Nazism, in particular concerning Carl Schmitt's theories, argues Agamben:

To understand modern phenomena such as the fascist Duce or the Nazi Führer, it is important not to forget their continuity with the principle of auctoritas principis {Agamben refers here to Augustus's Res Gestae}. ...Neither does the Duce nor the Führer represent constitutionally defined public charges – even though Mussolini and Hitler endorsed respectively the charge of head of government and Reich's chancellor, just as Augustus endorsed the imperium consulare or the potestas tribunicia. The Duce's or the Führer's qualities are immediately related to the physical person and belong to the biopolitical tradition of auctoritas and not to the juridical tradition of potestas.

Thus, Agamben opposes Foucault's concept of "biopolitics" to right (law), as he defines the state of exception, in Homo sacer, as the inclusion of life by right under the figure of "ex-ception", which is simultaneously inclusion and exclusion. Following Walter Benjamin's lead, he explains that our task would be to radically differentiate "pure violence" from right, instead of tying them together, as did Carl Schmitt.

Agamben concludes his chapter on "Auctoritas and potestas" writing:

It is significative that modern specialists were so inclined to admit that auctoritas was inherent to the living person of the pater or the princeps. What was evidently an ideology or a fictio aiming to be the groundwork of auctoritas' preeminence or, at least, specific rank compared to potestas thus became a figure of right's {"droit"} immanence to life. ... Although it is evident that there can't be an eternal human type that would incarnate itself each time in Augustus, Napoleon, Hitler, but only more or less comparable ("semblables") mechanisms {"dispositif", a term often used by Foucault} – the state of exception, justitium, the auctoritas principis, the Führertum -, put in use in more or less different circumstances, in the 1930s – overall, but not only – in Germany, the power that Weber had defined as "charismatic" is related to the concept of auctoritas and elaborated in a Führertum doctrine as the original and personal power of a leader. In 1933, in a short article intending to define the fundamental concepts of national-socialism, Schmitt defines the Führung principle (sic!) by the "root identity between the leader and his entourage".{"identité de souche entre le chef et son entourage"}

Agamben's thoughts on the state of emergency lead him to declare that the difference between dictatorship and democracy is incredibly thin, perhaps even ontologically non-existent, as rule by decree became more and more common, starting from World War I and the reorganization of constitutional balance. Agamben often reminds us that Hitler never abrogated the Weimar Constitution: he suspended it for the duration of the Third Reich with the Reichstag Fire Decree, issued on 28 February 1933. Indefinite suspension of the law is what characterizes the state of exception.

=== The Highest Poverty (2011) ===
The English edition was translated by Adam Kotsko. In this study of medieval monastic rules, Agamben offers a genealogical approach to several concepts that Ludwig Wittgenstein established in his late philosophy, primarily the Philosophical Investigations: rule-following, form of life, and the central importance of 'use' (for Wittgenstein: 'the meaning of a word is its use in language', and he uses 'language' not just to speak of word-language but any understandable behaviour). Agamben traces earlier versions of the term 'form-of-life' throughout the development of monastic life, beginning with the establishment of a genre of written rules in the fourth century. The aim of the book is to differentiate between 'law' and a particular use of a rule that is opposite to the implementation of law. In order to sketch out the potential of this concept, we would need 'a theory of use – of which Western philosophy lacks even the most elementary principles'. Agamben turns to the Franciscans to survey a unique historical incident of a group organising itself with a rule that is their life, and thinking of their own lives not as their own possession but as a communal 'use'; he examines the ways in which this idea developed and how it eventually lapsed into the law of the Catholic Church. According to reviewer Nathan Schneider, "The Highest Poverty examines two medieval Christian attempts, in the name of eternal life, to live this life beyond the reach of ordinary politics: several centuries of monasticism, and then the brief and momentous epiphany in the movement founded by Francis of Assisi. Each, according to Agamben, fails in revealing ways."

=== Personal views ===
==== Criticism of US response to 9/11 ====
Giorgio Agamben is particularly critical of the United States' response to 11 September 2001, and its instrumentalization as a permanent condition that legitimizes a "state of exception" as the dominant paradigm for governing in contemporary politics. He warns against a "generalization of the state of exception" through laws like the USA PATRIOT Act, which means a permanent installation of martial law and emergency powers. In January 2004, he refused to give a lecture in the United States because under the US-VISIT he would have been required to give up his biometric information, which he believed stripped him to a state of "bare life" (zoe) and was akin to the tattooing that the Nazis did during World War II.

However, Agamben's criticisms target a broader scope than the US "war on terror". As he argues in State of Exception (2005), rule by decree has become common since World War I in all modern states, and has been generalised and abused since then. Agamben points out a general tendency of modernity, recalling for example that when Francis Galton and Alphonse Bertillon invented "judicial photography" for "anthropometric identification", the procedure was reserved to criminals; to the contrary, today's society is tending toward a generalization of this procedure to all citizens, placing the population under permanent suspicion and surveillance: "The political body thus has become a criminal body". And Agamben notes that the Jews deportation in France and other occupied countries was made possible by the photos taken from identity cards. Furthermore, Agamben's political criticisms open up in a larger philosophical critique of the concept of sovereignty itself, which he argues is intrinsically related to the state of exception.

==== Statements on COVID-19 ====
Agamben, in an article published by Il Manifesto on 26 February 2020, quoted the NRC in saying that there was no COVID-19 pandemic: "In order to make sense of the frantic, irrational, and absolutely unwarranted emergency measures adopted for a supposed epidemic of coronavirus, we must begin from the declaration of the Italian National Research Council (NRC), according to which 'there is no SARS-CoV2 epidemic in Italy.' and 'the infection, according to the epidemiological data available as of today and based on tens of thousands of cases, causes light/moderate symptoms (a variant of flu) in 80–90% of cases. In 10–15%, there is a chance of pneumonia, but it also has a benign outcome in the large majority of cases. We estimate that only 4% of patients require intensive therapy.'" Agamben argued that “the health emergency was being exaggerated” to create a state of exception. Agamben's views were strongly criticised by Sergio Benvenuto, Roberto Esposito, Divya Dwivedi, Shaj Mohan, Jean-Luc Nancy, Benjamin H. Bratton, and others.

== Bibliography ==
Agamben's major books are listed in order of first Italian publication (with the exception of Potentialities, which first appeared in English), and English translations are listed where available. There are translations of most writings in German, French, Portuguese, and Spanish.

- L'uomo senza contenuto (1970). Translated by Georgia Albert as The Man without Content (1999). 0-8047-3554-9
- Stanze. La parola e il fantasma nella cultura occidentale (1977). Trans. Ronald L. Martinez as Stanzas: Word and Phantasm in Western Culture (1992). 0-8166-2038-5
- Infanzia e storia: Distruzione dell'esperienza e origine della storia (1978). Trans. Liz Heron as Infancy and History: The Destruction of Experience (1993). 0-86091-645-6
- Il linguaggio e la morte: Un seminario sul luogo della negatività (1982). Trans. Karen E. Pinkus with Michael Hardt as Language and Death: The Place of Negativity (1991). ISBN 0-8166-4923-5
- Idea della prosa (1985). Trans. Michael Sullivan and Sam Whitsitt as Idea of Prose (1995). ISBN 0-7914-2380-8
- La comunità che viene (1990). Trans. Michael Hardt as The Coming Community (1993). ISBN 0-8166-2235-3
- Bartleby, la formula della creazione (1993, contains Bartleby, or the Contingency, an essay included in Potentialities, (1999). ISBN 0-8047-3278-7 and a text by Gilles Deleuze from 1989, Bartleby ou la formule, also in Deleuze, Essays Clinical and Critical (1997). ISBN 0-8166-2569-7
- Homo Sacer. Il potere sovrano e la nuda vita (Homo sacer, I) (1995). Trans. Daniel Heller-Roazen as Homo Sacer: Sovereign Power and Bare Life (1998). ISBN 0-8047-3218-3
- Mezzi senza fine. Note sulla politica (1996). Trans. Vincenzo Binetti and Cesare Casarino as Means Without End: Notes of Politics (2000). ISBN 0-8166-3036-4
- Categorie italiane. Studi di poetica (1996). Trans. Daniel Heller-Roazen as The End of the Poem: Studies in Poetics (1999). ISBN 0-8047-3022-9
- Quel che resta di Auschwitz. L'archivio e il testimone (Homo sacer, III) (1998). Trans. Daniel Heller-Roazen as Remnants of Auschwitz: The Witness and the Archive. Homo Sacer III (1999). ISBN 1-890951-17-X
- Potentialities: Collected Essays in Philosophy. (1999). First published in English translation and edited by Daniel Heller-Roazen. ISBN 0-8047-3278-7. Published in the original Italian, with additional essays, as La potenza del pensiero: Saggi e conferenza (2005).
- Il tempo che resta. Un commento alla Lettera ai Romani (2000). Trans. Patricia Dailey as The Time that Remains: A Commentary on the Letter to the Romans (2005). ISBN 0-8047-4383-5
- L'aperto. L'uomo e l'animale (2002). Trans. Kevin Attell as The Open: Man and Animal (2004). ISBN 0-8047-4738-5
- Stato di eccezione (Homo sacer, II, 1) (2003). Trans. Kevin Attell as State of Exception (2005). ISBN 0-226-00925-4
- Profanazioni (2005). Trans. Jeff Fort as Profanations (2008). ISBN 1-890951-82-X
- Che cos'è un dispositivo? (2006). Trans. David Kishik and Stefan Pedatella in What is an Apparatus? and Other Essays (2009). ISBN 0-8047-6230-9
- L'amico (2007). Trans. David Kishik and Stefan Pedatella in What is an Apparatus? and Other Essays (2009). ISBN 0-8047-6230-9
- Ninfe (2007). Trans. Amanda Minervini as "Nymphs" in Releasing the Image: From Literature to New Media, ed. Jacques Khalip and Robert Mitchell (2011). ISBN 978-0-8047-6137-6
- Il regno e la gloria. Per una genealogia teologica dell'economia e del governo (Homo sacer, II, 4) (2007). Trans. Lorenzo Chiesa with Matteo Mandarini as The Kingdom and the Glory: For a Theological Genealogy of Economy and Government (2011). ISBN 978-0-8047-6016-4
- Che cos'è il contemporaneo? (2007). Trans. David Kishik and Stefan Pedatella in What is an Apparatus? and Other Essays (2009). ISBN 0-8047-6230-9
- Signatura rerum. Sul Metodo (2008). Trans. Luca di Santo and Kevin Attell as The Signature of All Things: On Method (2009). ISBN 978-1-890951-98-6
- Il sacramento del linguaggio. Archeologia del giuramento (Homo sacer, II, 3) (2008). Trans. Adam Kotsko as The Sacrament of Language: An Archaeology of the Oath (2011).
- Nudità (2009). Trans. David Kishik and Stefan Pedatella as Nudities (2010). ISBN 978-0-8047-6950-1
- Angeli. Ebraismo Cristianesimo Islam (ed. Emanuele Coccia and Giorgio Agamben). Neripozza, Vicenza 2009.
- La Chiesa e il Regno (2010). ISBN 978-88-7452-226-2. Trans. Leland de la Durantaye as The Church and the Kingdom (2012). ISBN 978-0-85742-024-4
- La ragazza indicibile. Mito e mistero di Kore (2010, with Monica Ferrando.) ISBN 978-88-370-7717-4. Trans. Leland de la Durantaye and Annie Julia Wyman as The Unspeakable Girl: The Myth and Mystery of Kore (2014). ISBN 978-0-85742-083-1
- Altissima povertà. Regole monastiche e forma di vita (Homo sacer, IV, 1) (2011). ISBN 978-88-545-0545-2. Trans. Adam Kotsko as The Highest Poverty: Monastic Rules and Form-of-Life (2013). ISBN 978-0-8047-8405-4
- Opus Dei. Archeologia dell'ufficio (Homo sacer, II, 5) (2012). ISBN 978-88-339-2247-8. Trans. Adam Kotsko as Opus Dei: An Archaeology of Duty (2012). ISBN 978-0-8047-8403-0.
- Pilato e Gesú (2013). ISBN 978-88-7452-409-9 Trans. by Adam Kotsko as Pilate and Jesus (2015) ISBN 978-0804794541
- Il mistero del male: Benedetto XVI e la fine dei tempi (2013). ISBN 978-88-581-0831-4 Trans. by Adam Kotsko as The Mystery of Evil: Benedict XVI and the End of Days (2017) ISBN 978-1503602731
- "Qu'est-ce que le commandement?" (2013) ISBN 978-2-7436-2435-4 (French translation only, no original version published.)
- "Leviathans Rätsel" ('Leviathan's Riddle') (2013) ISBN 978-3-16-153195-8. English trans. Paul Silas Peterson
- Il fuoco e il racconto (2014). ISBN 978-88-7452-500-3 Trans. by Lorenzo Chiesa as The Fire and the Tale (2017) ISBN 978-1503601642
- L'uso dei corpi (Homo sacer, IV, 2) (2014). ISBN 978-88-545-0838-5. Trans. Adam Kotsko as The Use of Bodies (2016). ISBN 978-0-8047-9234-9
- L'avventura (2015). ISBN 978-88-7452-555-3 Trans. by Lorenzo Chiesa as The Adventure (2018) ISBN 978-0262037594
- Stasis. La guerra civile come paradigma politico (2015). ISBN 978-88-339-2587-5. Trans. Nicholas Heron as Stasis: Civil War as a Political Paradigm (2015). ISBN 978-0-8047-9731-3
- Pulcinella ovvero Divertimento per li regazzi in quattro scene (2015). ISBN 978-88-7452-574-4 Trans. by Kevin Attell as Pulcinella: Or Entertainment for Children (2019) ISBN 978-0857425409
- Che cos'è la filosofia? (2016). ISBN 978-88-7462-791-2 Trans. by Lorenzo Chiesa as What Is Philosophy? (2017) ISBN 978-1503602212
- Che cos'è reale? La scomparsa di Majorana (2016). ISBN 978-88-545-1407-2 Trans. by Lorenzo Chiesa as What Is Real? (2018) ISBN 978-1503606210
- Creazione e anarchia (2017) Trans. Adam Kotsko as Creation and Anarchy (2019) ISBN 978-1503609266
- Karman. Breve trattato sull'azione, la colpa e il gesto (2017) ISBN 978-8833928821 Trans. by Adam Kotsko as Karman: A Brief Treatise on Action, Guilt, and Gesture (2017) ISBN 978-1503605824
- Studiolo (2019) ISBN 9788806243838
- A che punto siamo? L’epidemia come politica (2019) ISBN 978-8822905390 Trans. by Valeria Dani as Where Are We Now? The Epidemic as Politics (2020) ISBN 978-1912475353
- La follia di Hölderlin. Cronaca di una follia abitante (1806–1843) (2021). ISBN 9788806248161 Trans. by Alta L. Price as Hölderlin's Madness: Chronicle of a Dwelling Life 1806–1843 (2023) ISBN 9781803091150

Articles and essays

- "Nei campi dei senza nome". Il Manifesto (in Italian). Italy. 3 November 1998. Archived from the original on 27 May 2010.
- "Gênes et la peste". L'Humanité (in French). France. 27 August 2001. Archived from the original on 27 May 2010.
- The State of Emergency, extract from a lecture 10 December 2002, at the Centre Roland Barthes-University of Paris VII, Denis Diderot. Entire French text.
- Philosophical Archaeology (abstract). Law and Critique. Vol. 20, No. 3, 2009, pp. 211–231.
- Introductory Note on the Concept of Democracy. Theory & Event. Vol. 13, No. 1, 2010.
- Se la feroce religione del denaro divora il futuro. 16 February 2012. La Repubblica.
- The 451 Manifesto 23 December 2012. Le Monde. La Repubblica.
- The "Latin Empire" should strike back. 15 March 2013, La Repubblica. 24 March 2013, Libération.
- Various articles published by Multitudes, available .
- Giorgio Agamben on coronavirus: “The enemy is not outside, it is within us.”, Stanford.
- To Whom is Poetry Addressed?, New Observations 130 (2014), p. 11.

== See also ==
- State of emergency: Use and viewpoints
- Basileus
- Dispositif
- Homo sacer
- Interregnum
- Justitium
- Unlawful combatants
