= Deaths in May 2019 =

The following is a list of notable deaths in May 2019.

Entries for each day are listed alphabetically by surname. A typical entry lists information in the following sequence:

- Name, age, country of citizenship at birth, subsequent country of citizenship (if applicable), reason for notability, cause of death (if known), and reference.

== May 2019 ==
=== 1 ===
- Issa J. Boullata, 90, Palestinian scholar and writer.
- Simon Cain, 80, English-Australian actor (Carry On).
- Dinko Dermendzhiev, 77, Bulgarian footballer (Botev Plovdiv, national team), complications from a stroke.
- Mary Doakes, 82, American educator.
- Bill Fleischman, 80, American journalist (Philadelphia Daily News).
- Lou Johnson, 78, American soul singer.
- Maa Afia Konadu, 67, Ghanaian radio presenter.
- Kurt Lang, 95, German-born American sociologist, respiratory failure.
- Arnor Njøs, 88, Norwegian soil scientist.
- Gene Ovesen, 90, American curler.
- Alessandra Panaro, 79, Italian actress (Poveri ma belli, Belle ma povere, Rocco and His Brothers).
- Sir Arvi Parbo, 93, Estonian-born Australian mining executive (BHP, WMC Resources, Alcoa).
- Beatrix Philipp, 73, German politician, member of the Landtag of North Rhine-Westphalia (1985–1994) and the Bundestag (1994–2013).
- B. Subhashan Reddy, 76, Indian judge, Chief Justice of Madras High Court (2001–2004) and Kerala High Court (2004–2005).
- Donald Trunkey, 81, American trauma surgeon.
- Heinz Unbehauen, 83, German control engineer.

=== 2 ===
- Roland Aboujaoudé, 88, Lebanese Maronite Catholic hierarch, Auxiliary Bishop of Antioch (1985–2011).
- Max Arthur, 80, British military historian and actor (Doctor Who).
- Susan Beschta, 67, American punk rock musician and judge, brain cancer.
- Mike Boehm, 63, American music critic and arts reporter.
- George C. Clerk, 87, Ghanaian botanist and plant pathologist.
- Michel Crauste, 84, French rugby union player (Racing, Lourdes, national team).
- Fatimih Dávila, 31, Uruguayan model, Miss Uruguay (2006), homicide.
- Larry Dick, 64, American football player (Maryland Terrapins, Saskatchewan Roughriders).
- Rolf Eckrodt, 76, German automotive engineer and executive, CEO of Mitsubishi Motors (2001–2005).
- Monroe Eley, 70, American football player (BC Lions, Atlanta Falcons).
- Telésforo Santiago Enríquez, Mexican journalist, shot.
- David Harney, 72, English footballer (Grimsby Town, Scunthorpe United, Wimbledon). (death announced on this date)
- Rafael Hernández Colón, 82, Puerto Rican politician, Governor (1973–1977, 1985–1993), leukemia.
- Master Hirannaiah, 85, Indian actor (No 73, Shanthi Nivasa, ...Re), liver disease.
- Frank Ivancie, 94, American businessman and politician, Mayor of Portland, Oregon (1980–1985).
- Lord Toby Jug, 53, British politician.
- Red Kelly, 91, Canadian Hall of Fame ice hockey player (Detroit Red Wings, Toronto Maple Leafs) and politician, MP (1962–1965).
- Li Xintian, 95, Chinese psychologist.
- Micha Lindenstrauss, 81, German-born Israeli judge, State Comptroller (2005–2012).
- Duncan MacRae, 85, New Zealand rugby league player (national team).
- Pinoke McIntyre, 84, Canadian ice hockey player (Trail Smoke Eaters).
- Muluken Melesse, 65, Ethiopian singer.
- Reginald Mengi, 75, Tanzanian businessman.
- Ali Mroudjaé, 79, Comorian politician, Prime Minister (1982–1984).
- Md. Nazim Uddin, 84, Bangladeshi freedom fighter.
- Pauline O'Regan, 96, New Zealand educator and writer.
- Chris Reccardi, 54, American animator (The Ren & Stimpy Show, Samurai Jack, The Powerpuff Girls) and musician, heart attack.
- Gloria Schiff, 90, American fashion editor and model.
- John Starling, 79, American bluegrass musician (The Seldom Scene), Grammy winner (1992), heart failure.
- Murray Thomson, 96, Canadian peace activist.
- Guido van den Berg, 44, German politician, member of the Landtag of North Rhine-Westphalia (since 2012), cancer.
- Juan Vicente Torrealba, 102, Venezuelan harpist and composer.
- Warren W. Wiersbe, 89, American biblical scholar and pastor.
- Mike Williamson, 90, Australian sports commentator (3AK, 3AW, HSV-7).
- David Gordon Wilson, 91, British-born American engineering professor.

=== 3 ===
- Richard Brown, 86, American lawyer, Queens County District Attorney (since 1991).
- Peter Bucher, 72, German Olympic handball player (1972).
- George Economou, 84, American poet.
- Bill Gompers, 91, American football player (Buffalo Bills).
- Kjell Grandhagen, 64, Norwegian military officer, head of the Norwegian Intelligence Service (2010–2015), multiple myeloma.
- Dante Gullo, 71, Argentine sociologist and politician, member of the Chamber of Deputies (2007–2011) and Buenos Aires City Legislature (2011–2015).
- George Hanna, 90, Iraqi-American basketball player.
- Sir Peter Herbert, 90, British admiral.
- Andy Jick, 66, American sports announcer (Boston Celtics, Boston College Eagles).
- Chuck Kinder, 76, American novelist, heart failure.
- V. Viswanatha Menon, 92, Indian politician.
- Nicholas Panuzio, 83, American politician.
- Mose Se Sengo, 73, Congolese musician.
- Goro Shimura, 89, Japanese mathematician (Shimura variety, Taniyama-Shimura conjecture).
- Frits Soetekouw, 80, Dutch footballer (Ajax, DWS, national team).
- Irene Sutcliffe, 94, British actress (Coronation Street).
- Enrico Taglietti, 93, Italian-born Australian architect, recipient of the Australian Institute of Architects Gold Medal (2007).
- Linn Underhill, 82, American photographer.
- Greg Younging, 58, Canadian Opaskwayak academic.
- Bob Zeman, 82, American football player (Los Angeles/San Diego Chargers) and coach (Oakland Raiders, San Francisco 49ers).

=== 4 ===
- Alia Abdulnoor, Emirati imprisoned woman (born 1977)
- Claude Cadart, 91, French sinologist.
- Charles Clarke, 95, British military officer.
- J. R. Cobb, 75, American musician (Atlanta Rhythm Section, Classics IV), heart attack.
- Salvatore Corallo, 90, Italian politician, President of Sicily (1961), Deputy (1976–1979) and Senator (1979–1983).
- Robert G. Craddock, 88, American politician.
- Rachel Held Evans, 37, American Christian writer, encephalitis after allergic antibiotic reaction.
- Terje Moe Gustavsen, 64, Norwegian politician, Minister of Transport and Communications (2000–2001) and Director of the Public Roads Administration (since 2007), lung infection.
- Thomas Hynes, 80, American politician and lawyer, complications from Parkinson's disease.
- Jumpin Jackie Jackson, 79, American basketball player (Harlem Globetrotters).
- Ajmal Khan, Pakistani botanist.
- Émile Knecht, 95, Swiss Olympic rower.
- MacArthur Lane, 77, American football player (St. Louis Cardinals, Green Bay Packers, Kansas City Chiefs).
- Laurie Montgomery, 82, Canadian politician.
- Prospero Nograles, 71, Filipino politician, member (2001–2010) and Speaker of the House of Representatives (2008–2010).
- Ray Peters, 72, American baseball player (Milwaukee Brewers).
- Ruth Anna Putnam, 91, American philosopher.
- William N. Salin, 87, American politician.
- Adam Sky, 42, Australian DJ, severed artery from broken glass.
- Tommy Sopwith, 86, British racing driver.
- Tyrone Thompson, 51, American politician, member of the Nevada Assembly (since 2013).
- Ralph Tyre, 85, American politician.
- Yang Shengnan, 81, Chinese historian and palaeographer.

=== 5 ===
- Frank Brilando, 93, American Olympic racing cyclist.
- Paco Cabasés, 102, Argentine footballer (Talleres de Córdoba), pneumonia.
- Feng Shunhua, 85, Chinese economist.
- Lewis A. Fidler, 62, American politician, member of the New York City Council (2002–2013).
- Laura Mako, 102, American interior decorator.
- Eugene McGee, 78, Irish Gaelic football manager (Offaly, Cavan).
- Norma Miller, 99, American lindy hop dancer, heart failure.
- Kadir Mısıroğlu, 86, Turkish conspiracy theorist.
- Celil Oker, 67, Turkish author.
- Barbara Perry, 97, American actress (The Andy Griffith Show, The Dick Van Dyke Show, The Hathaways).
- Magaly Quintana, 66, Nicaraguan historian and women's rights activist, stroke.
- Shih Chi-yang, 84, Taiwanese politician, Minister of Justice (1984–1988), Vice Premier (1988–1993) and President of the Judicial Yuan (1994–1999), multiple organ failure.
- Hani Shukrallah, 69, Egyptian journalist (Al-Ahram).

=== 6 ===
- Anuar Abu Bakar, 48, Malaysian football player (Selangor, national team) and manager (PKNS), liver cancer.
- Pekka Airaksinen, 73, Finnish composer and musician.
- Max Azria, 70, Tunisian fashion designer.
- Jürgen Bräuninger, 62, South African composer, cancer.
- Jack Cohen, 85, British scientist and author.
- Dan Cordtz, 92, American business correspondent (ABC News, Financial World), cancer.
- Noor van Crevel, 100, Dutch social worker and political lesbian activist
- Gjermund Eggen, 77, Norwegian Olympic cross-country skier, world champion (1966).
- Peter Gammond, 93, British music critic and journalist.
- Andrés Junquera, 73, Spanish footballer (Real Madrid, Real Zaragoza), heart attack.
- John Lukacs, 95, Hungarian-born American historian.
- Kip Niven, 73, American actor (Magnum Force, Earthquake, Midway), heart attack.
- Seymour Nurse, 85, Barbadian cricketer (West Indies cricket team).
- Pierre Riché, 97, French historian.
- Jimmy Satterfield, 79, American football coach (Furman University).
- Ted Witherden, 97, English cricketer.
- George O. Zimmerman, 85, Polish-born American physicist.

=== 7 ===
- A. B. M. Taleb Ali, 92, Bangladeshi teacher and politician.
- Urs Amann, 67, Swiss painter.
- Ralph Benjamin, 96, British engineer and inventor.
- Charles Clarke, 95, British Royal Air Force officer.
- Dan Clawson, 70, American sociologist.
- Seamus Close, 71, Northern Irish politician, MLA (1998–2007), liver cancer.
- Rafael Coronel, 87, Mexican painter.
- Karina Constantino David, 73, Filipino political activist and public servant.
- Vicente Emano, 76, Filipino politician, Governor of Misamis Oriental (1988–1998) and Mayor of Cagayan de Oro (1998–2007, 2010–2013), pneumonia.
- Bernt Frilén, 73, Swedish orienteer, world champion (1972, 1974).
- Pedro Gamarro, 64, Venezuelan boxer, silver medalist at the 1976 Summer Olympics.
- Larry Hanley, 62, American union leader, international president of the Amalgamated Transit Union (since 2010), pulmonary disease.
- Georg Katzer, 84, German composer.
- Boris Kushner, 77, Russian-born American mathematician.
- Te Wharehuia Milroy, 81, New Zealand Māori language academic.
- Prasert na Nagara, 100, Thai scholar.
- Subir Nandi, 66, Bangladeshi musician and playback singer (Shuvoda, Megher Pore Megh), multiple organ failure.
- Robert Pear, 69, American journalist (The New York Times), stroke.
- Roberta L. Raymond, 80, American actress and open housing activist, heart failure.
- Dorothea M. Ross, 95, Canadian-American psychologist.
- Adam Svoboda, 41, Czech ice hockey player (Nürnberg Ice Tigers, national team), suicide by hanging.
- Jacques Taminiaux, 90, Belgian philosopher.
- Arnaldo Taurisano, 85, Italian basketball coach (Cantù, Partenope Napoli, Brescia).
- Jean Vanier, 90, Canadian philosopher, theologian and humanitarian, founder of L'Arche, thyroid cancer.
- Joel Virador, 52, Filipino politician, member of the House of Representatives (2003–2007), thyroid cancer.
- Michael Wessing, 66, German Olympic javelin thrower, European champion (1978), complications from surgery.

=== 8 ===
- Martin Belinga Eboutou, 79, Cameroonian political figure and diplomat.
- Jens Beutel, 72, German politician, Lord Mayor of Mainz (1997–2011).
- Sprent Dabwido, 46, Nauruan politician, President (2011–2013), throat cancer.
- Ketaki Prasad Dutta, 74, Indian politician, MLA (1983–1985).
- Jim Fowler, 89, American zoologist and television host (Wild Kingdom).
- Richard Hidalgo, 52, Peruvian mountain climber.
- Antoine Koné, 56, Ivorian Roman Catholic prelate, Bishop of Odienné (since 2009).
- Yevgeny Krylatov, 85, Russian film composer (Film, Film, Film), pneumonia.
- Edgardo Maranan, 72, Filipino writer.
- Robert McEliece, 76, American mathematician and engineering professor.
- N. R. Madhava Menon, 84, Indian legal educator, liver cancer.
- David Montgomery, 72, American baseball executive (Philadelphia Phillies), cancer.
- Wendell Nedderman, 97, American academic administrator, President of the University of Texas at Arlington (1972–1992).
- Georges Pouliot, 96, Canadian Olympic fencer (1948).
- Judith S. Stern, 76, American nutritionist.
- Peter Webb, 85, New Zealand art dealer.

=== 9 ===
- Abul Khayr Alonto, 73, Filipino politician, lawyer and businessman, chairman of the Mindanao Development Authority (since 2016), pneumonia.
- David Arias Pérez, 89, Spanish-born American Roman Catholic prelate, Auxiliary Bishop of Newark (1983–2004).
- Daniel H. Bays, 77, American historian, Parkinson's disease.
- Vasili Blagov, 64, Russian Olympic pair skater (1972), Soviet champion (1972).
- Martin Canin, 89, American pianist.
- Sergey Dorenko, 59, Russian journalist and news presenter (Vremya), aortic rupture.
- Dave Edstrom, 80, American decathlete, Pan American champion (1959).
- Preston Epps, 88, American musician.
- Clement von Franckenstein, 74, American actor (Lionheart, The American President, Death Becomes Her), hypoxia.
- Manuel Giner Miralles, 92, Spanish politician, Deputy (1982–1983).
- Walter Harris, 93, British author.
- Jim Hawkes, 84, Canadian politician, MP (1979–1993), dementia.
- Nelly Korniyenko, 80, Russian actress.
- Arif Malikov, 85, Azerbaijani composer, People's Artist of the USSR (1986).
- Mary McEldowney-Evanson, 97, American environmentalist.
- Thomas Nozkowski, 75, American painter.
- Annemarie Pawlik, 80, Austrian politician, Senator (1990).
- Allene Roberts, 90, American actress (The Red House, Knock on Any Door).
- Mark Rubinstein, 74, American financial engineer.
- Alvin Sargent, 92, American screenwriter (Julia, Ordinary People, Spider-Man 2), Oscar winner (1978, 1981).
- B. Mitchell Simpson, 87, American lawyer and naval historian.
- Freddie Starr, 76, English comedian, heart disease.
- Micky Steele-Bodger, 93, English rugby union player (Harlequins, Barbarians, national team).
- R. Ervin Taylor, 81, American anthropologist.
- Dan van der Vat, 79, Dutch-born British journalist and naval historian.
- Brian Walden, 86, British broadcaster (Weekend World) and politician, MP (1964–1977), emphysema.
- Yuan Baohua, 103, Chinese politician and academic administrator, Director of the State Economic Commission (1981–1982), President of Renmin University (1985–1991).
- Zhan Wenshan, 78, Chinese physicist, founding director of the Technical Institute of Physics and Chemistry, Chinese Academy of Sciences.

=== 10 ===
- Carey Adamson, 76, New Zealand Air Force officer, Chief of Defence Force (1999–2001).
- Atanasio Ballesteros, 56, Spanish lawyer and politician, Deputy (1993–2000) and Senator (2000–2004).
- Dude Barton, 95, American rodeo cowgirl.
- Fleming Begaye Sr., 97, American WWII Navajo code talker.
- Malcolm Black, 58, New Zealand musician (Netherworld Dancing Toys), bowel cancer.
- Frederick Brownell, 79, South African vexillographer, designer of the South African and Namibian flag.
- Bert Cooper, 53, American boxer, pancreatic cancer.
- Wiley Young Daniel, 72, American senior judge, United States District Court for the District of Colorado (since 1995).
- Jon Gittens, 55, English footballer (Swindon Town, Portsmouth, Exeter City).
- Anatol Herzfeld, 88, German sculptor and artist.
- Robert O. Hickman, 92, American pediatric nephrologist, inventor of the Hickman line.
- Richard L. Hills, 82, British historian.
- Janet Kitz, 89, Scottish-born Canadian historian and author (Shattered City: The Halifax Explosion and the Road to Recovery).
- Jorge Longarón, 86, Spanish comics artist and illustrator (Friday Foster).
- John MacInnes, 89, Scottish Gaelic scholar.
- Thoppil Mohamed Meeran, 74, Indian Tamil writer.
- Gordon Neate, 78, English footballer (Reading).
- Domenico Padovano, 78, Italian Roman Catholic prelate, Bishop of Conversano-Monopoli (1987–2016).
- Alfredo Pérez Rubalcaba, 67, Spanish politician, Deputy Prime Minister (2010–2011), Minister of the Interior (2006–2011) and Secretary General of the PSOE (2012–2014), stroke.
- Warren H. Phillips, 92, American journalist (The Wall Street Journal) and executive (Dow Jones & Company).
- M. Ramanathan, 84, Indian politician, MLA (1984–1991).
- Geneviève Raugel, 68, French mathematician.
- Dick Sadler, 90, American politician.
- Paul-Werner Scheele, 91, German Roman Catholic prelate, Bishop of Würzburg (1979–2003).
- Ellamae Simmons, 101, American immunologist.
- Dick Tomey, 80, American football coach (Hawaii Rainbow Warriors, Arizona Wildcats), lung cancer.
- James Tuck, 79, American archaeologist.

=== 11 ===
- Jean-Claude Brisseau, 74, French film director (Céline, Secret Things, Les Anges Exterminateurs).
- Hector Busby, 86, New Zealand Māori navigator and traditional waka builder.
- Sheikh Chand Mohammad, 88, Indian politician, speaker of Assam Legislative Assembly (1979–1986), deputy speaker of Assam Legislative Assembly (1968–1979), MLA (1978–1985).
- Gunther Cunningham, 72, German-born American football coach (Kansas City Chiefs, San Diego Chargers, Detroit Lions), cancer.
- Cecil Dawkins, 91, American author.
- Gianni De Michelis, 78, Italian politician, Minister of Foreign Affairs (1989–1992), Deputy Prime Minister (1988–1989) and Deputy (1976–1994).
- Yogesh Chander Deveshwar, 72, Indian businessman, Chairman and CEO of ITC Limited (1996–2017), cancer.
- Melissa Ede, 58, English transgender rights campaigner and social media personality, heart attack.
- AKM Gouach Uddin, 69, Bangladeshi politician, MP (1988–1990).
- Larry Howard, 73, American baseball player (Houston Astros, Atlanta Braves).
- Carol Johnston, 61, Canadian gymnast.
- Harold Lederman, 79, American boxing judge and analyst (HBO World Championship Boxing), cancer.
- Peggy Lipton, 72, American actress (The Mod Squad, Twin Peaks, The Postman) and model, Golden Globe winner (1970), colon cancer.
- Dan Lodboa, 72, Canadian ice hockey player (Chicago Cougars).
- Pua Magasiva, 38, Samoan-born New Zealand actor (Shortland Street, Power Rangers Ninja Storm, 30 Days of Night).
- Josef Matoušek, 90, Czech Olympic hammer thrower (1964).
- Robert D. Maxwell, 98, American combat soldier, recipient of the Medal of Honor.
- Hans Muchitsch, 86, Austrian Olympic athlete (1960).
- Marcelo Muniagurria, 72, Argentine trade unionist, engineer and agronomist, President of INTA, Vice Governor of Santa Fe Province (1999–2003) and Deputy (1991–1995).
- Bruce Peppin, 94, British Olympic speed skater.
- Rong Baisheng, 88, Chinese architect and civil engineer (Guangdong International Building).
- Benoît Serré, 68, Canadian politician, cancer.
- Silver King, 51, Mexican professional wrestler (CMLL, WCW) and actor (Nacho Libre), heart attack.
- Thomas Silverstein, 67, American convicted murderer, Aryan Nations leader, complications from heart surgery.
- Eddie Ugbomah, 78, Nigerian film director, producer and actor.
- Nan Winton, 93, British broadcaster, first female BBC newsreader, fall.
- Sol Yaged, 96, American jazz clarinetist.

=== 12 ===
- Mads H. Andenæs, 79, Norwegian legal academic.
- Leonard Lee Bailey, 76, American surgeon, throat cancer.
- Cosimo Campioto, 84, Italian Olympic rower (1956).
- Italo Casali, 78, Sammarinese Olympic sport shooter (1972, 1976).
- Eva Dahr, 60, Norwegian filmmaker (Himmelblå, Appelsinpiken, Hotel Cæsar).
- Dong Jian, 83, Chinese literary scholar, Vice President of Nanjing University (1988–1993).
- Dale Greig, 81, Scottish long-distance runner.
- Alan Grover, 74, Australian rowing coxswain, Olympic silver medalist (1968).
- Klara Guseva, 82, Russian speed skater, Olympic champion (1960), traffic collision.
- Chauncey Hare, 84, American photographer.
- Nazir Hoosein, 78, Indian racing driver and motorsport administrator.
- Anatoli Ionov, 79, Russian ice hockey player, Olympic champion (1968).
- Machiko Kyō, 95, Japanese actress (Rashomon, Ugetsu, The Teahouse of the August Moon), heart failure.
- Viktor Manakov, 58, Russian cyclist, Olympic champion (1980), complications from surgery.
- Michał Marek, 36, Polish cave diver.
- Doug McAvoy, 80, British trade union leader.
- Hubert Monteilhet, 90, French author.
- Héctor Enrique Olivares, 61, Argentine politician, engineer and agricultural producer, Deputy (since 2015), shot.
- B. Venkatarama Reddy, 75, Indian film producer (Uzhaippali, Bhairava Dweepam, Nammavar).
- Gene Romero, 71, American motorcycle racer.
- Nasrallah Boutros Sfeir, 98, Lebanese Maronite cardinal, Patriarch of Antioch (1986–2011), chest infection.
- Alan Skirton, 80, English footballer (Bath City, Arsenal), Alzheimer's disease.
- Ron Smerczak, 69, South African actor (Who Am I?, Dangerous Ground, Shadow).
- José Terrón, 79, Spanish actor (For a Few Dollars More, The Good, the Bad and the Ugly, Django).
- Bill K. Williams, 75, American politician, mayor of Saxman, Alaska (1976–1983), member of the Alaska House of Representatives (1993–2005).
- Bill Workman, 78, American politician, mayor of Greenville, South Carolina (1983–1995).
- Hiralal Yadav, 93, Indian folk singer.

=== 13 ===
- Unita Blackwell, 86, American politician and civil rights activist, mayor of Mayersville, Mississippi (1976–2001), complications of dementia.
- Jerome Callet, 89, American music teacher and instrument designer.
- Doris Day, 97, American actress (Pillow Talk, Calamity Jane), singer ("Que Sera, Sera") and animal welfare activist, Golden Globe winner (1958, 1960, 1963, 1989), pneumonia.
- Velma Demerson, 98, Canadian human rights activist.
- Samuel Eugenio, 60, Peruvian football player (Club Universitario de Deportes) and coach, complications from surgery.
- Lajos Faragó, 86, Hungarian footballer (national team), Olympic bronze medallist (1960).
- Stanton T. Friedman, 84, American-Canadian nuclear physicist and ufologist.
- Dionisio Gallarati, 96, Italian mathematician.
- Theodore Gleim, 85, Canadian politician.
- Mari Griffith, 79, Welsh radio presenter and singer, cancer.
- Hu Jinqing, 83, Chinese animator and director (The Fight Between the Snipe and the Clam, Calabash Brothers).
- Isaac Kappy, 42, American actor (Terminator Salvation, Lemonade Mouth, Thor) and musician, suicide by jumping.
- Jörg Kastendiek, 54, German politician, member of the Bürgerschaft of Bremen (1991–2005, since 2007), lymphoma.
- Lo Tung-bin, 92, Taiwanese biochemist, member of Academia Sinica (since 1986).
- Colin Powell, 81, British economist.
- Hayat Saif, 76, Bangladeshi poet and literary critic.
- Nobuo Sekine, 76, Japanese sculptor.
- Kochavi Shemesh, 75, Iraqi-born Israeli lawyer and social activist, leader of the Black Panthers protest movement.
- George Smith, 75, Scottish football referee.
- Werner Weist, 70, German footballer (Borussia Dortmund, Werder Bremen, Stuttgarter Kickers).

=== 14 ===
- Urbano José Allgayer, 95, Brazilian Roman Catholic prelate, Bishop of Passo Fundo (1982–1999).
- Lutz Bacher, 75, American artist.
- Yuriy Bohutsky, 66, Ukrainian politician, Minister of Culture (1999, 2001–2005, 2006–2007), complications from surgery.
- Leopoldo Brizuela, 55, Argentine journalist, translator and poet, winner of Alfaguara Prize (2012) and Konex Award (2014).
- Tim Conway, 85, American actor (McHale's Navy, The Carol Burnett Show, SpongeBob SquarePants) and comedian, complications from normal pressure hydrocephalus.
- Tommy Donbavand, 53, English children's author and actor (Scream Street), throat and lung cancer.
- Grumpy Cat, 7, American internet celebrity cat, complications from urinary tract infection.
- Andrei Guzienko, 55, Ukrainian footballer (Alga Frunze, Prykarpattya Ivano-Frankivsk, Bukovyna Chernivtsi), ruptured aneurysm.
- Masaki Hoshino, 52, Japanese Go player.
- Sven Lindqvist, 87, Swedish author.
- Liu Housheng, 98, Chinese theatre director, critic, scholar, and playwright, Vice President of the China Theatre Association, co-founded the Plum Blossom Award.
- Barbara York Main, 90, Australian arachnologist.
- Iris Meléndez, Puerto Rican prosecutor, cancer.
- Mike Möllensiep, 43, German footballer (Schalke 04, VfB Lübeck, Dynamo Dresden), cancer.
- Ferenc József Nagy, 96, Hungarian politician, Minister of Agriculture (1990–1991).
- Étienne Perruchon, 61, French composer.
- Robert Bruce Propst, 87, American senior judge, United States District Court for the Northern District of Alabama (since 1980).
- Ben Raemers, 28, British skateboarder, suicide.
- Leon Rausch, 91, American singer (The Texas Playboys).
- Alice Rivlin, 88, American economist, director of the Office of Management and Budget (1994–1996).
- Michael Rossmann, 88, German-American physicist and microbiologist.
- Otto P. Strausz, 95, Hungarian-born Canadian chemist.
- Remig Stumpf, 53, German Olympic cyclist (1988), suicide.
- Daniel Vidart, 98, Uruguayan anthropologist, historian and essayist.
- Mike Wilhelm, 77, American musician (The Charlatans, Flamin' Groovies), cancer.

=== 15 ===
- Rob Babcock, 66, American basketball executive (Denver Nuggets, Minnesota Timberwolves, Toronto Raptors), pancreatic cancer.
- Roger Blackley, 65, New Zealand art historian (Victoria University of Wellington).
- Huelyn Duvall, 79, American rockabilly musician.
- Georgie Anne Geyer, 84, American syndicated newspaper columnist.
- Edgar Gorgas, 91, German Olympic boxer (1952).
- Ikuo Kamei, 85, Japanese politician, member of the House of Councillors, respiratory failure.
- George L. Kelling, 83, American criminologist and professor (Harvard University, Rutgers University–Newark, Manhattan Institute for Policy Research), cancer.
- Charles Kittel, 102, American physicist.
- Frank F. Ledford Jr., 85, American military doctor, Surgeon General of the United States Army (1988–1992).
- Daisy Riley Lloyd, 95, American politician, member of the Indiana House of Representatives (1964–1966).
- Juan Antonio Menéndez Fernández, 62, Spanish Roman Catholic prelate, Bishop of Astorga (since 2015), heart attack.
- Gabriel Mmole, 80, Tanzanian Roman Catholic prelate, Bishop of Mtwara (1988–2015).
- Richard Moore, 88, British journalist and politician.
- Kenneth Newing, 95, British Anglican prelate, Bishop of Plymouth (1982–1988).
- Neerav Patel, 68, Indian poet, cancer.
- Eduardo A. Roca, 97, Argentine diplomat, Ambassador to the United States (1968–1970).
- John Ronane, 85, British actor (Strangers).
- Yōko Sugi, 90, Japanese actress (Sound of the Mountain, Repast, A Wife's Heart), colon cancer.
- Rod Tam, 65, American politician, member of the Hawaii House of Representatives (1982–1994) and Senate (1994–2002), complications from leukemia.
- Noel Taylor, 76, Australian rules footballer (Hawthorn).
- Michael Zampelas, 82, Cypriot politician, mayor of Nicosia (2002–2006).

=== 16 ===
- Nikolai Baturin, 82, Estonian novelist and playwright.
- Piet Blauw, 81, Dutch politician, member of the House of Representatives (1981–1998).
- David Cervinski, 48, Australian soccer player (Melbourne Knights, Carlton, Wollongong Wolves), melanoma.
- Steve Duemig, 64, American golfer and sports media personality (WDAE, WFNS, Tampa Bay Lightning), complications from brain cancer.
- Jean-Pierre Grafé, 87, Belgian politician.
- Bob Hawke, 89, Australian politician, Prime Minister (1983–1991), President of the ACTU (1969–1980).
- Jonas af Jochnick, 81, Swedish businessman, co-founder of Oriflame.
- G. N. Lakshmipathy, 104, Indian film producer (Devara Makkalu, Kaadu, Ondanondu Kaladalli).
- Liu Xianjue, 87, Chinese architectural historian.
- André Lurton, 94, French winemaker (Château Couhins-Lurton, Château La Louvière, Château Dauzac).
- Tohir Malik, 72, Uzbek writer.
- Emmanuel Mapunda, 83, Tanzanian Roman Catholic prelate, Bishop of Mbinga (1986–2011).
- Peer Mascini, 78, Dutch actor.
- Ashley Massaro, 39, American professional wrestler (WWE), model (Playboy) and reality show contestant (Survivor), suicide by hanging.
- Mick Micheyl, 97, French actress, singer and sculptor.
- Jamil Naqsh, 79, Pakistani painter, pneumonia.
- Tommy O'Connell, 79, English hurler (Kilkenny GAA).
- Daniel Anthony O'Donohue, 87, American diplomat.
- Walter Olmo, 80, Italian composer.
- I. M. Pei, 102, Chinese-born American architect (Bank of China Tower, East Building of the National Gallery of Art, Louvre Pyramid), Pritzker Prize winner (1983).
- Jennifer Price, 79, British archaeologist.
- Dominick P. Purpura, 92, American neuroscientist.
- Bob Schloredt, 79, American football player (Washington Huskies, BC Lions) and coach.
- Dexter St. Louis, 51, Trinidadian Olympic table tennis player (1996, 2008).
- Geoff Toseland, 87, English footballer (Sunderland).
- Steve Young, 69, American politician.

=== 17 ===
- Paulius Antanas Baltakis, 94, Lithuanian Roman Catholic prelate, Apostolic Visitor for the Lithuanians in Diaspora (1984–2003).
- Giancarlo Bassi, 93, Italian Olympic ice hockey player.
- Osvaldo Batocletti, 69, Argentine football player and manager (Tigres UANL), cancer.
- Barbara Cranmer, 59, Canadian ʼNamgis documentary filmmaker, brain cancer.
- Peter Dahl, 85, Norwegian-born Swedish painter.
- Jan Elvheim, 69, Norwegian politician, MP (1989–1993).
- S. M. Mohamed Idris, 92, Malaysian worker and consumer rights activist, heart failure.
- Leslie Ronald Kay, 99, British academic administrator.
- Howard Kilroy, 83, Irish businessman (Bank of Ireland, Smurfit Kappa).
- Neville Lederle, 80, South African racing driver.
- John Warlick McDonald, 97, American diplomat.
- Jimmy McLeod, 82, Canadian ice hockey player (St. Louis Blues).
- Anton O'Toole, 68, Irish Gaelic footballer (Dublin).
- Rallapalli, 73, Indian actor (Bombay, Minsara Kanavu, Anveshana).
- Paul William Roberts, 68–69, Canadian writer, brain haemorrhage.
- Valentyn Sapronov, 87, Ukrainian football player (Shakhtar, national team) and manager (Lokomotyv Donetsk).
- Clarence Scott, 75, American football player (New England Patriots).
- Kadavoor Sivadasan, 87, Indian politician and trade unionist, MLA (1980–1996, since 2001).
- William Ennis Thomson, 91, American music educator.
- Gerardo Traverso, 43, Uruguayan footballer (Durazno, Guaraní, Dundee).
- Jean Valentine, 94, British codebreaker.
- Herman Wouk, 103, American author (The Caine Mutiny, The Winds of War, War and Remembrance), Pulitzer Prize winner (1952).

=== 18 ===
- Mario Baudoin, 76, Bolivian biologist.
- Jean Beaudin, 80, Canadian film director (J.A. Martin Photographer, The Alley Cat, The Collector).
- Milton Born With A Tooth, 61, Canadian political activist, bowel cancer.
- Manfred Burgsmüller, 69, German footballer (Borussia Dortmund, Werder Bremen, West Germany national team).
- Austin Eubanks, 37, American motivational speaker, survivor of the Columbine High School massacre, heroin overdose.
- Analía Gadé, 87, Argentine actress (Emergency Ward, Yesterday Was Spring, Another's Wife), cancer.
- Aleksandr Irkhin, 65, Russian football manager (Tyumen, Kuban, Metallurg Krasnoyarsk), heart attack.
- Perry Jeter, 88, American football player (Chicago Bears).
- Jürgen Kissner, 76, German cyclist, Olympic silver medalist (1968).
- Sir Timothy Kitson, 88, British politician, MP for Richmond, North Yorkshire (1959–1983).
- Marylou Olivarez Mason, 82, American civil servant.
- Ney da Matta, 52, Brazilian football manager (Ipatinga, Brasiliense, CRAC), pancreatitis.
- John Payne, 86, American football coach (Saskatchewan Roughriders).
- Quentin Pongia, 48, New Zealand rugby league player (Canberra Raiders, Sydney Roosters, national team), bowel cancer.
- Justin Ponsor, 42, American comic book artist (Avengers, Spider-Man, X-Men), cancer.
- Guenther Roth, 88, American sociologist.
- Sammy Shore, 92, American comedian and actor, co-founder of The Comedy Store.
- Signe Marie Stray Ryssdal, 94, Norwegian lawyer and politician, MP (1965–1973) and County Governor of Aust-Agder (1983–1994).
- Genevieve Waite, 71, South African actress, singer and model.
- Doug Wilson, 88, New Zealand rugby union player (Canterbury, Wellington, national team).
- Mitch Wilson, 57, Canadian ice hockey player (Pittsburgh Penguins, New Jersey Devils), complications from amyotrophic lateral sclerosis.

=== 19 ===
- Carlos Altamirano, 96, Chilean lawyer and politician, MP (1961–1973) and Secretary-General of the Socialist Party (1971–1979).
- Leidy Asprilla, 22, Colombian footballer (Orsomarso), traffic collision.
- Jan Bagiński, 86, Polish Roman Catholic prelate, Auxiliary Bishop of Opole (1985–2009).
- William W. Caldwell, 93, American senior judge, U.S. District Court Judge for the Middle District of Pennsylvania (since 1982).
- George Chaump, 83, American football player and coach (IUP Indians, Marshall Thundering Herd, Navy Midshipmen).
- Vitaliy Chernobai, 89, Ukrainian Olympic pole vaulter (1956).
- Francisco de Ridder, 89, Argentine Olympic alpine skier (1952).
- Denis Earp, 88, South African military officer, Chief of the South African Air Force (1984 – 1988).
- Nilda Fernández, 61, Spanish-born French chanson singer, heart failure.
- Knut Fredriksson, 89, Swedish Olympic javelin thrower (1960).
- Maya Ghosh, 70, Bangladeshi actress.
- Amédée Grab, 89, Swiss Roman Catholic prelate, Bishop of Lausanne, Geneva and Fribourg (1995–1998) and Chur (1998–2007).
- Bert J. Harris Jr., 99, American politician, member of the Florida House of Representatives (1982–1996).
- Ingemar Hedberg, 99, Swedish sprint canoeist, world champion (1950), Olympic silver medalist (1952).
- David Hunt, 80, English botanist.
- Nickey Iyambo, 82, Namibian politician, Vice-President (2015–2018).
- Alfred Janson, 82, Norwegian composer and pianist.
- Amalie Kass, 91, American historian.
- Bogdan Konopka, 65, Polish photographer.
- Nativo Lopez, 67, Mexican-American political activist, President of the Mexican American Political Association (2004–2012), bowel cancer.
- John Millett, 98, Australian poet.
- Vijaya Mulay, 98, Indian film director (Ek Anek Aur Ekta), historian and educationist.
- Susan Papa, 64, Filipino swimmer, cervical cancer.
- Liudvikas Saulius Razma, 81, Lithuanian politician.
- Bengt Rösiö, 92, Swedish diplomat, ambassador to Saudi Arabia (1974–1977), Pakistan (1977–1979), Czechoslovakia (1979–1981), Malaysia (1981–1985), and Zaire (1990–1992).
- Roy Sandstrom, 87, British Olympic sprinter.
- Julio César Trujillo, 88, Ecuadorian lawyer and politician, member of the National Congress (1979–1984), complications from intracerebral haemorrhage.
- Grace Starry West, 72, American classics scholar, translator and academic (University of Dallas, Hillsdale College), lung cancer.
- Ronnie Young, 71, American politician, member of the South Carolina House of Representatives (since 2017).

=== 20 ===
- Nanni Balestrini, 83, Italian experimental poet (Neoavanguardia).
- Adrish Bardhan, 86, Indian science fiction writer.
- Dave Bookman, 58, Canadian radio broadcaster (CFNY-FM, CIND-FM).
- Hermann Bottenbruch, 90, German computer scientist.
- Sandy D'Alemberte, 85, American lawyer and administrator, member of the Florida House of Representatives (1966–1972), President of the ABA (1991–1992) and FSU (1994–2003).
- Rex Dunlop, 91, Scottish footballer (Rangers, Workington, Cheltenham Town).
- Yasuo Furuhata, 84, Japanese film director (Poppoya), pneumonia.
- Dimitri Gogos, 88, Greek-Australian journalist and newspaper editor.
- Andrew Hall, 65, English actor (Butterflies, Casualty, Coronation Street).
- Peter Hitchcock, 75, Australian environmentalist.
- Derek Holman, 88, British-born Canadian composer and conductor.
- Niki Lauda, 70, Austrian racing driver and airline owner, Formula One world champion (1975, 1977, 1984).
- Will Lotter, 94, American athletics coach.
- Miguel Montes, 79, Spanish football player and manager (Sporting de Gijón).
- John Moore, Baron Moore of Lower Marsh, 81, British politician, MP (1974–1992).
- Czesław Nawrot, 77, Polish Olympic rower.
- Nguyễn Quảng Tuân, 93, Vietnamese writer and poet.
- Solomon Ogbeide, Nigerian football manager (Lobi Stars).
- Edmund Outslay, 67, American taxation professor.
- Remus Opriș, 60, Romanian politician, MP (1992–2000).
- Charles C. Pattillo, 94, American Air Force lieutenant general.
- Nick Peters, 51, English cricketer (Surrey County Cricket Club), cancer.
- Ronnie Virgets, 77, American writer (The Times-Picayune, Gambit) and reporter (WWL-TV).
- Mira Zakai, 76, Israeli opera singer, complications from a stroke.

=== 21 ===
- Tirong Aboh, 41, Indian politician, MLA (since 2014), shot.
- Colin Atkinson, 67, New Zealand cricketer.
- James O. Bass, 108, American lawyer and politician, member of the Tennessee Senate (1936–1938).
- Kenelm Burridge, 96, Maltese-born American anthropologist.
- Lawrence Carroll, 64, Australian-born American painter.
- Densey Clyne, 96, Australian naturalist and author.
- Dennis Farnon, 95, Canadian composer.
- Fred Fox, 104, American French horn player and brass instrument teacher.
- Ernest Graves Jr., 94, American Army lieutenant general.
- Liam Hennessy, 87, Irish footballer (Shamrock Rovers).
- Brian Kann, 85, Australian football player (Hawthorn).
- Rik Kuypers, 94, Belgian film director (Seagulls Die in the Harbour).
- Michael Lynch, 84, Irish politician, TD (1982, 1987–1989), Senator (1983–1987).
- Ali Mohammad Mahar, 52, Pakistani politician, Minister of Narcotics Control (since 2018) and MP (since 2008), heart attack.
- Royce Mills, 77, British actor (History of the World, Part I, Up the Chastity Belt, Doctor Who).
- Yavuz Özkan, 76–77, Turkish film director (The Mine).
- Aase Texmon Rygh, 94, Norwegian sculptor.
- Glauco Sansovini, 81, Sammarinese politician, Captain Regent (2010).
- Peter Schulze, 83, Australian politician, member of the Tasmanian Legislative Council (1988–1999).
- Ginette Seguin, 85, Canadian Olympic alpine skier.
- Bohumil Staša, 75, Czech motorcycle road racer.
- Rosław Szaybo, 85, Polish painter, photographer and album cover designer, lung cancer.
- Donald West VanArtsdalen, 99, American senior judge, U.S. District Court Judge for the Eastern District of Pennsylvania (since 1970), leukemia.
- Freddie Velázquez, 81, Dominican baseball player (Seattle Pilots, Atlanta Braves).
- Binyavanga Wainaina, 48, Kenyan writer and journalist, stroke.
- Hisae Yanase, 75, Japanese artist.
- John A. Yngve, 94, American lawyer and politician, member of the Minnesota House of Representatives (1963–1968).

=== 22 ===
- Ahmad Shah of Pahang, 88, Malaysian royal, Sultan of Pahang (1974–2019) and Yang di-Pertuan Agong (1979–1984).
- Maurice Bamford, 83, English rugby league player and coach (Wigan Warriors, Leeds Rhinos, Great Britain).
- Theresa Burroughs, 89, American civil rights activist.
- John Richard Dobell, 87, British politician.
- Tony Gennari, 76, Italian-American basketball player (Varese, Milano 1958, Venezia Mestre).
- Joar Hoff, 80, Norwegian football player and manager (Lillestrøm).
- Khalid Hossain, 83, Bangladeshi Nazrul Geeti singer.
- Flaminia Jandolo, 89, Italian actress and voice actress.
- Kwame Kenyatta, 63, American politician, Detroit City Councilman (2006–2013).
- Judith Kerr, 95, German-born British writer and illustrator (The Tiger Who Came to Tea, Mog).
- Alfred Kröner, 79, German geologist.
- Beverly Lunsford, 74, American actress (Leave It to Beaver, The Intruder, The Crawling Hand).
- S I M Nurunnabi Khan, 77, Bangladeshi freedom fighter and writer.
- Surya Prakash, 79, Indian artist.
- Eduard Punset, 82, Spanish economic journalist (BBC, The Economist), science popularizer and politician, Deputy (1982–1983) and MEP (1987–1994), lung cancer.
- Ned Quinn, 96, Irish hurler.
- Louis Ricco, 89, American mobster.
- François-René Tranchefort, 86, French musicologist.

=== 23 ===
- Zakir Rashid Bhat, 24, Indian militant, founder of Ansar Ghazwat-ul-Hind, shot.
- Joseph Cottet, 96, Swiss politician, member of the Grand Council of Fribourg (1957–1971) and the National Council (1983–1987).
- Dumiso Dabengwa, 79, Zimbabwean politician, Minister of Home Affairs (1992–2000), President of the Zimbabwe African People's Union (since 2008), liver disease.
- Kalpana Dash, 52, Indian mountaineer.
- Joseph Devine, 81, Scottish Roman Catholic prelate, Bishop of Motherwell (1983–2013).
- Bill Dickie, 93, Canadian politician, member of the Legislative Assembly of Alberta (1963–1975).
- Bondan Gunawan, 71, Indonesian politician, Minister of State secretariat (2000).
- Gerald Item, 58, Indonesian swimmer.
- Shirley Brannock Jones, 93, American district court judge.
- Mike Laffin, 101, Canadian politician, MLA for Cape Breton Centre (1963–1974, 1981–1988).
- Peter Landau, 84, German jurist and legal historian.
- Bobby Joe Long, 65, American convicted serial killer and rapist, execution by lethal injection.
- Hosei Norota, 89, Japanese politician, Director-General of the Defense Agency (1998–1999) and Minister of Agriculture, Forestry and Fisheries (1995–1996), bladder cancer.
- Wilfredo Peláez, 88, Uruguayan Olympic basketball player (1952).
- Ping Hsin-tao, 92, Taiwanese publisher and producer.
- Marie-Madeleine Prongué, 79, Swiss politician, Senator (1995).
- Zlatko Škorić, 77, Croatian footballer (Dinamo Zagreb, Stuttgart, Yugoslavia national team).
- Beaton Tulk, 75, Canadian politician, Premier of Newfoundland and Labrador (2000–2001) and MHA (1979–1989, 1993–2002), prostate cancer.
- Anna Udvardy, 69, Hungarian film producer (Sing), Oscar winner (2017).
- Wim Woudsma, 61, Dutch footballer (Go Ahead Eagles).
- Zhang Shiping, 72, Chinese businessman, chairman of China Hongqiao Group.

=== 24 ===
- Horst H. Baumann, 84, German architect and light artist.
- Curtis Blake, 102, American businessman and philanthropist, co-founder of Friendly's.
- Gianfranco Bozzao, 82, Italian footballer (Arezzo, SPAL, Juventus).
- Hugolino Cerasuolo Stacey, 87, Ecuadorian Roman Catholic prelate, Bishop of Loja (1985–2007).
- Bertrand P. Collomb, 76, French business executive.
- Jaroslav Erik Frič, 69, Czech poet, musician and publisher, cancer.
- Murray Gell-Mann, 89, American physicist, Nobel Prize laureate (1969).
- Oleg Golovanov, 84, Russian rower, Olympic champion (1960).
- Judith Hockaday, 89, British neurologist, peritoneal carcinoma.
- Sharon McAuslan, 74–75, New Zealand jurist, District Court judge (1995–2015).
- Edmund Morris, 78, Kenyan-born British-American writer and biographer (The Rise of Theodore Roosevelt, Dutch: A Memoir of Ronald Reagan), Pulitzer Prize winner (1980), stroke.
- Alan Murray, 78, Australian golfer, skin cancer.
- Ronald E. Nehring, 71, American judge, Justice of the Utah Supreme Court (2003–2015), complications of radiation treatments for cancer.
- Manuel Pazos, 89, Spanish footballer (Real Madrid, Atlético Madrid, Elche).
- John Pinto, 94, American Navajo code talker and politician, member of the New Mexico Senate (since 1977).
- Otis Washington, 80, American football coach.
- Dušica Žegarac, 75, Serbian actress (The Ninth Circle).

=== 25 ===
- Margaret-Ann Armour, 79, Scottish-born Canadian chemist.
- Paolo Babbini, 83, Italian politician, Deputy (1979–1983, 1987–1994).
- Rod Bramblett, 53, American sportscaster (Auburn Tigers), traffic collision.
- Claus von Bülow, 92, Danish-British socialite.
- Jean Burns, 99, Australian aviator.
- Raúl Diniz, 68, Portuguese Olympic weightlifter.
- Gerry Fraley, 64, American sportswriter.
- Joseph Anthony Galante, 80, American Roman Catholic prelate, Bishop of Camden (2004–2013).
- Rene Goulet, 86, Canadian professional wrestler (AWA, WWF).
- Anthony Graziano, 78, American consigliere (Bonanno crime family).
- Robert Hecht-Nielsen, 71, American computer scientist.
- Dmytro Kremin, 65, Ukrainian poet, journalist and translator.
- Ibrahim Lame, 66, Nigerian educator and politician, Senator (1992–1993) and Minister of Police Affairs (2008–2010).
- LaSalle D. Leffall Jr., 89, American surgeon and oncologist.
- Karel Masopust, 76, Czech ice hockey player, Olympic silver medalist (1968).
- Thembinkosi Mbamba, 23, South African footballer (TS Galaxy), traffic collision.
- Seamus McGrane, 64, Irish dissident republican, convicted of terrorism as leader of the Real Irish Republican Army, heart attack.
- Mou Tun-fei, 78, Chinese film director (A Deadly Secret, Men Behind the Sun, Black Sun: The Nanking Massacre).
- Fredrick Oduya Oprong, 83, Kenyan politician.
- Nicolae Pescaru, 76, Romanian footballer (Brașov, national team).
- Vittorio Zucconi, 74, Italian-American journalist and writer (la Repubblica).

=== 26 ===
- Abdel Latif El Zein, 86, Lebanese politician, MP (1960–2018).
- Leann Birch, 72, American developmental psychologist and academic.
- Percy Erceg, 90, New Zealand rugby union player (North Auckland, Auckland, national team), Tom French Cup winner (1951).
- Harry Hood, 74, Scottish football player (Celtic) and manager (Queen of the South), cancer.
- Everett Kinstler, 92, American painter.
- Eşref Kolçak, 92, Turkish actor (Namus Uğruna, Berlin in Berlin, Güle Güle).
- Richard Paul Matsch, 88, American senior judge, Chief Judge of the District Court for the District of Colorado (1994–2000).
- George Park, 86, Canadian Olympic swimmer.
- Joe Russo, 74, American baseball coach (St. John's Red Storm).
- Rafael Safarov, 71, Russian football player and manager (Anzhi Makhachkala).
- Edmund Seger, 82, German Olympic wrestler.
- Norbert Schedler, 86, American professor of philosophy.
- Olaf Schneewind, 57, German-born American microbiologist, cancer.
- Bart Starr, 85, American Hall of Fame football player (Green Bay Packers) and coach, Super Bowl MVP (1967, 1968), complications from a stroke.
- Stephen Thorne, 84, British actor (Z-Cars, Crossroads, Doctor Who).
- Prem Tinsulanonda, 98, Thai military officer and politician, Prime Minister (1980–1988), Regent (2016), heart failure.
- Kath Venn, 92, Australian politician, member of the Tasmanian Legislative Council for Hobart (1976–1982).
- Allen Williams, 74, American actor (Lou Grant, Knots Landing, Days of our Lives).

=== 27 ===
- Kevin Joseph Aje, 85, Nigerian Roman Catholic prelate, Bishop of Sokoto (1984–2011).
- Kamlesh Balmiki, 51, Indian politician, MP (2009–2014).
- Robert L. Bernstein, 96, American publisher (Random House) and human rights activist (Helsinki Watch).
- Jocelyne Blouin, 68, Canadian meteorologist and weather presenter, cancer.
- Bill Buckner, 69, American baseball player (Los Angeles Dodgers, Chicago Cubs, Boston Red Sox), Lewy body dementia.
- Petru Cărare, 84, Moldovan writer.
- Veeru Devgan, 77, Indian film choreographer (Inkaar), actor (Kranti) and director (Hindustan Ki Kasam), cardiac arrest.
- Gabriel Diniz, 28, Brazilian singer and composer, plane crash.
- John Ellis, 88, British politician, MP for Bristol North West (1966–1970) and Brigg and Scunthorpe (1974–1979).
- Karin Hafstad, 82, Norwegian politician, MP (1973–1981).
- Laurie Hendren, 60, Canadian computer scientist, cancer.
- Gamini Hettiarachchi, 68, Sri Lankan actor, (Sidu), complications from a kidney transplant.
- Roger O. Hirson, 93, American dramatist and screenwriter (Pippin, Walking Happy).
- Tony Horwitz, 60, American journalist (The Wall Street Journal) and author (Confederates in the Attic, Blue Latitudes), Pulitzer Prize winner (1995).
- Guy Jansen, 84, New Zealand choral director.
- James S. Ketchum, 87, American psychiatrist and US army colonel.
- Jimilu Mason, 88–89, American sculptor.
- Les McFarlane, 66, Jamaican-born English cricketer (Lancashire).
- Judith McKenzie, 61, Australian archaeologist.
- Kelly Paris, 61, American baseball player (Cincinnati Reds, Chicago White Sox).
- Hariom Singh Rathore, 61, Indian politician, MP (2014–2019), cancer.
- Aharon Razin, 84, Israeli biochemist.
- Colin Ross, 85, English bagpipe maker.
- Sir David Sieff, 80, British businessman (Marks & Spencer).
- Alan Smith, 97, English footballer (Arsenal, Brentford).
- Moni Kumar Subba, 61, Indian politician, MP (1998–2009), heart failure.
- François Weyergans, 77, Belgian novelist and film director (Flesh Color).

=== 28 ===
- Horace Belton, 63, American football player (Montreal Alouettes, Kansas City Chiefs).
- Freddy Buache, 94, Swiss journalist, film critic and historian.
- Fabio Calzavara, 68, Italian politician, Deputy (1996–2001), heart attack.
- Carmine Caridi, 85, American actor (The Godfather Part II, Bugsy, Summer Rental), pneumonia.
- Linda Collins, 57, American politician, member of the Arkansas House of Representatives (2011–2013) and Senate (2015–2019), stabbing.
- Dan Crane, 83, American politician, member of the U.S. House of Representatives (1979–1985).
- Jean Juventin, 91, French politician, Deputy (1978–1986, 1993–1997), President of the Assembly of French Polynesia (1988–1991, 1992–1995) and Mayor of Papeete (1977–1995).
- Khoo Kay Kim, 82, Malaysian historian, respiratory failure.
- Li Hengde, 97, Chinese materials scientist, academician of the Academy of Engineering.
- Nicole Laroche, 73, French engineer, in 1964 became first female Gadzarts, at the École nationale supérieure d'arts et métiers engineering grande ecole
- John Paul Meagher, 80, Canadian politician.
- Ralph Murphy, 75, British-born Canadian country musician, pneumonia.
- Elmo Natali, 92, American football player and coach (California Vulcans).
- Apolo Nsibambi, 78, Ugandan academic and politician, Prime Minister (1999–2011), cancer.
- Levi Oakes, 94, Canadian-born American soldier, last living WWII Mohawk code talker.
- Max Oates, 77, Australian rules footballer (Footscray).
- Włodzimierz Ptak, 90, Polish immunologist and microbiologist.
- Fritz Schösser, 71, German politician, member of the Bavarian Senate (1992–1994), Landtag of Bavaria (1994–1998) and Bundestag (1998–2005).
- Edward Seaga, 89, Jamaican politician, Prime Minister (1980–1989), cancer.
- Petr Sgall, 93, Czech linguist.
- Ingemar Skogö, 70, Swedish civil servant, Governor of Västmanland County (2009–2015), Director-General of the LFV (1992–2001) and the SRA (2001–2009).
- Nick Stato, 97, American boxer.
- Tuulikki Ukkola, 75, Finnish journalist (Kaleva) and politician, MP (1991–1995, 2007–2011) and leader of the Liberal People's Party (1993–1995).
- Thomas Wainwright, 78, English cricketer.
- Walter Wolfgang, 95, German-born British socialist and peace activist.
- Nick Yakich, 79, Australian rugby league player (Manly Warringah Sea Eagles).

=== 29 ===
- Jack Burton, 99, American Olympic equestrian (1956).
- Errett Callahan, 81, American archaeologist.
- Tony DeLap, 91, American artist.
- Dennis Etchison, 76, American author and editor.
- Michel Gaudry, 90, French jazz bassist.
- Tony Glover, 79, American blues harmonicist (Koerner, Ray & Glover).
- Muhammad Tholchah Hasan, 80, Indonesian Islamic cleric, academic, and politician, Minister of Religious Affairs (1999–2001), stomach cancer.
- Roy Jeffs, 26, American sexual abuse victim, suicide.
- Loren E. Monroe, 87, American politician, Michigan state treasuer (1978–1982).
- Adam Patel, Baron Patel of Blackburn, 78, British clothier and Member of the House of Lords (since 2000).
- Bayram Şit, 89, Turkish wrestler, Olympic champion (1952).
- Michael Spicer, 76, British politician, MP (1974–2010), chairman of the 1922 Committee (2001–2010) and Member of the House of Lords (since 2010), Parkinson's disease and leukaemia.
- Peggy Stewart, 95, American actress (The Fighting Redhead, The Life and Legend of Wyatt Earp, That's My Boy).
- Jiří Stránský, 87, Czech author, translator and political prisoner.
- María Luisa Vilca, 71, Peruvian Olympic sprinter.
- Jackie Winters, 82, American politician, member of the Oregon House of Representatives (1999–2003) and Senate (since 2003), lung cancer.
- Igor Zavozin, 63, Russian ice dancer.

=== 30 ===
- Mike Balson, 71, English footballer (Exeter City and Highlands Park) and referee, complications from Lewy Body Dementia.
- Elizabeth Baranger, 91, American physicist.
- Patricia Bath, 76, American ophthalmologist, cancer.
- Paulo de Mello Bastos, 101, Brazilian pilot.
- Heinz Becher, 85, German Olympic rower.
- Jim Bell, 83, Northern Irish-New Zealand footballer.
- Milan Blažeković, 78, Croatian animator (The Elm-Chanted Forest, The Magician's Hat, Lapitch the Little Shoemaker).
- Michel Canac, 62, French Olympic alpine skier (1984), skiing accident.
- Innocenzo Chatrian, 92, Italian Olympic cross-country skier (1956).
- Thad Cochran, 81, American politician, member of the U.S. Senate (1978–2018) and the House of Representatives (1973–1978), renal failure.
- Allan Edwards, 97, Australian cricketer (Western Australia).
- André Gerolymatos, 67, Greek-Canadian historian and professor, brain cancer.
- Eva Kleinitz, 47, German opera director.
- Johnny Kleinveldt, 61, South African cricketer (Western Province, Transvaal).
- Frank Lucas, 88, American drug trafficker, depicted in American Gangster.
- Arne Lyngstad, 57, Norwegian politician, MP (1997–2005), cancer.
- Jason Marcano, 35, Trinidadian footballer (San Juan Jabloteh, Central, Trinidad and Tobago national team), traffic collision.
- Murray Polner, 91, American editor and author.
- Anthony Price, 90, British author.
- Leon Redbone, 69, Cypriot-American singer-songwriter and actor (Elf), complications from dementia.
- Diogo Reesink, 84, Dutch Roman Catholic prelate, Bishop of Almenara (1989–1998) and Teófilo Otoni (1998–2009).
- Giuseppe Sandri, 72, Italian Roman Catholic prelate, Bishop of Witbank (since 2009).
- Andrew Sinclair, 84, British novelist and film director (The Breaking of Bumbo, Under Milk Wood, Blue Blood).
- John Tidmarsh, 90, English broadcaster and journalist (Outlook).

=== 31 ===
- David M. Ainsworth, 64, American politician, member of the Vermont House of Representatives (2007–2011, 2017–2019).
- Andaiye, 76, Guyanese political activist, cancer.
- Elmer Arterburn, 89, American football player (Chicago Cardinals).
- Roky Erickson, 71, American singer-songwriter (The 13th Floor Elevators).
- Paddy Fahey, 102, Irish composer and fiddler.
- Sir Grant Hammond, 75, New Zealand jurist, judge of the Court of Appeal (2004–2011).
- Đelo Jusić, 80, Croatian composer and guitarist.
- Panayotis Katsoyannis, 95, American biochemist.
- Jean-Claude Labrecque, 80, Canadian cinematographer and filmmaker.
- Jim Lash, 67, American football player (Minnesota Vikings, San Francisco 49ers).
- James T. Londrigan, 94, American judge.
- Jimmy Martin, 80, American politician, member of the Alabama House of Representatives (1998–2010, since 2014), cancer.
- Patrick Matolengwe, 82, South African Anglican bishop.
- Jim McMullan, 82, American actor (Dallas, Downhill Racer, Shenandoah), complications from ALS.
- Aideen Nicholson, 92, Irish-born Canadian politician.
- Laila Nur, 84, Bangladeshi language activist.
- Margaret Rayner, 89, British mathematician.
- Hari Sabarno, 74, Indonesian military officer and politician, Minister of Home Affairs (2001–2004).
- Le Anne Schreiber, 73, American sports editor (The New York Times, ESPN), lung cancer.
- John Slonczewski, 89, American physicist.
- Niara Sudarkasa, 80, American anthropologist, President of Lincoln University (1987–1998).
- Chitra Wakishta, 82, Sri Lankan actress (Kopi Kade).
