= Calzavara =

Calzavara is an Italian surname. Notable people with the surname include:

- Amalia Calzavara (born 1966), Italian sprint canoer
- Fabio Calzavara (1950–2019), Italian entrepreneur and politician
- Flavio Calzavara (1900–1981), Italian filmmaker
