= Strausz =

Strausz is a surname. Notable people with the surname include:

- Alexander Strausz (1829–1905), Hungarian-American brewer, architect, educator, and cartographer
- Gyula Strausz (1880–1949), Hungarian athlete
- Ján Strausz (1942–2017), Slovak footballer
- Otto P. Strausz (1924–2019), Hungarian-born Canadian chemist
- Robert Strausz-Hupé (1903–2002), Austrian-born American diplomat

== See also ==
- Strauss
