= Nazimuddin (disambiguation) =

Khawaja Nazimuddin (1894–1964) was the second Governor-General of Pakistan and the second Prime Minister of Pakistan.

Nazimuddin (Arabic: ناظم الدین) may also refer to:

- Md Nazimuddin, Bangladeshi retired lieutenant general
- Khwaja Nizamuddin Bhuyan (1949–1971), Bangladeshi military officer
- Mohammed Nazimuddin Ahmed (born 1985), Bangladeshi cricketer
- Md. Nazim Uddin, Bangladeshi fighter awarded the Bir Protik
- Mohammad Nazim Uddin, Bangladeshi writer

== See also ==
- MV Nazimuddin, ferry boat that sank in 2008
