= Samuel Eugenio =

Peruvian footballer and coach (1958–2019)

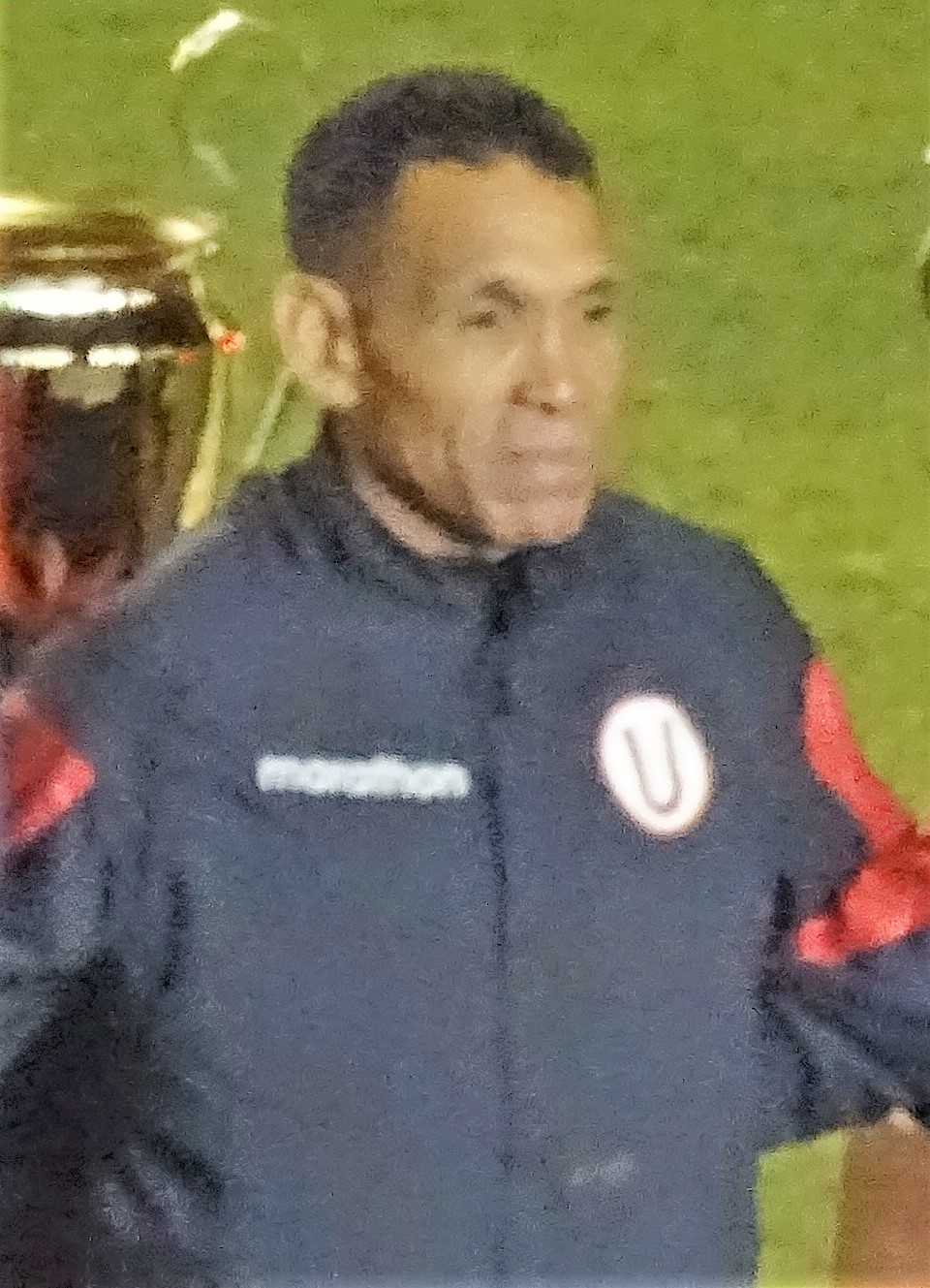

Personal information
- Full name: Samuel Ricardo Eugenio Cabrera
- Date of birth: 12 August 1958
- Place of birth: San Luis, Cañete, Peru
- Date of death: 13 May 2019 (aged 60)
- Place of death: Lima, Peru
- Height: 1.78 m (5 ft 10 in)
- Position: Defender

Team information
- Current team: Universitario

Samuel Ricardo Eugenio Cabrera (August 12, 1958 – May 13, 2019) was a Peruvian football player and coach. He played in the defense position. He was coach of minor divisions of Club Universitario de Deportes.

== Biography ==
He was born in San Luis de Cañete in 1958, the son of Samuel Eugenio Mazonce and Niela Cabrera Urriola. He was a flight engineer for the Peruvian Air Force.

He played in Universitario de Deportes for ten years, between 1980 and 1989, and won three titles in the years 1982, 1985 and 1987. The campaign of the 1985 title is remembered for a very serious injury caused by Eugenio to the player Enrique Boné of Sporting Cristal played on January 5, 1986. Then he would play in Sport Boys in 1991. His career started in the club Alayza, where he played in 1976 and 1977, and later defended the Golden Wings, in 1978.

In 2012 he served as technical director of Universitario de Deportes in the Copa Libertadores U-20.

After undergoing an emergency operation for peritonitis, he died on Monday, May 13, 2019.
