= Mary McEldowney-Evanson =

American environmentalist

Mary McEldowney-Evanson co-founded the organization Friends of Haleakalā National Park in partnership with the National Park Service, and her name became synonymous with environmental activism on Maui. December 20 was proclaimed as "Mary Evanson Day" by Maui Mayor Alan Arakawa to honor her 95th birthday in 2016. Evanson's conservation work is well recognized by the conservation community because there is scarcely an environmental health group in Maui where Evanson was not involved with their founding. Evanson died in May 2019 at the age of 97.

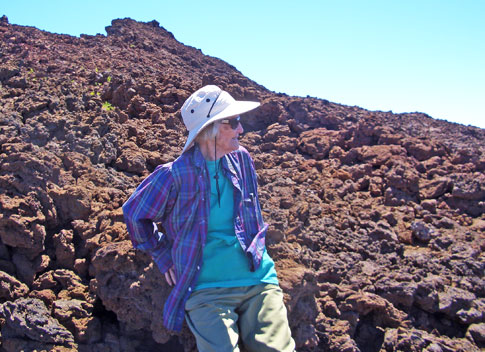
Image of Mary Evanson at Haleakalā. 2007.

== Early life ==
Evanson was born on December 20, 1921, in Honolulu on the island of Oahu, in Wahiawa, where her father, George A. McEldowney, worked for the Hawaiian Sugar Planters Association. Evanson's father was in charge of the Forest Nursery where they grew plants for reforesting. In the summers of her childhood, Evanson would occasionally spend time in Maui, as her parents owned property up in Kula and had built a house there. Evanson attended Leilehua Elementary School until eighth grade, then transferred and graduated from Punahou School. Evanson then continued her education by attending the University of Hawaii at Manoa, but for only a year. During this time, World War II had begun, and Evanson, wanting to help the war effort, found work at Schofield. When the bombing of Pearl Harbor took place, Evanson's parents shipped her off to the mainland to keep her safe.

When the war ended, Evanson returned home to Oahu and became a preschool teacher. She first worked at Waiokeola Church Preschool for around six years. She was then asked to start a preschool at Kilohana Church in Niu Valley, and worked there for around seven years. In 1976, Evanson moved to Maui after retiring from her preschool teaching position. Evanson first lived in Lahaina for a month, then in Kahului, and then finally settled and became a full-time resident in Haʻiku, Hamakua Loa.

== Conservation work ==
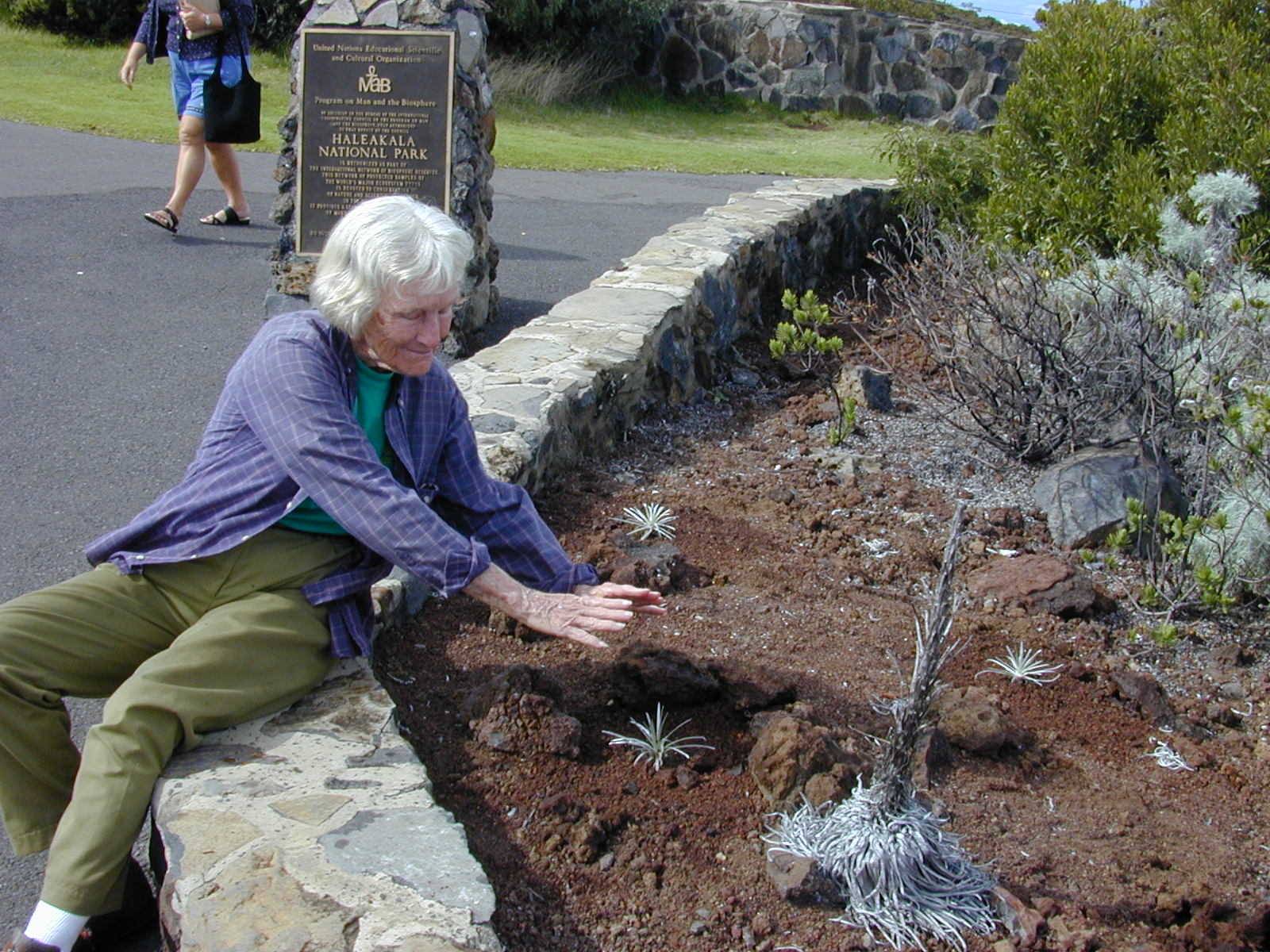
Mary Evanson outplanting Haleakalā silversword in Maui

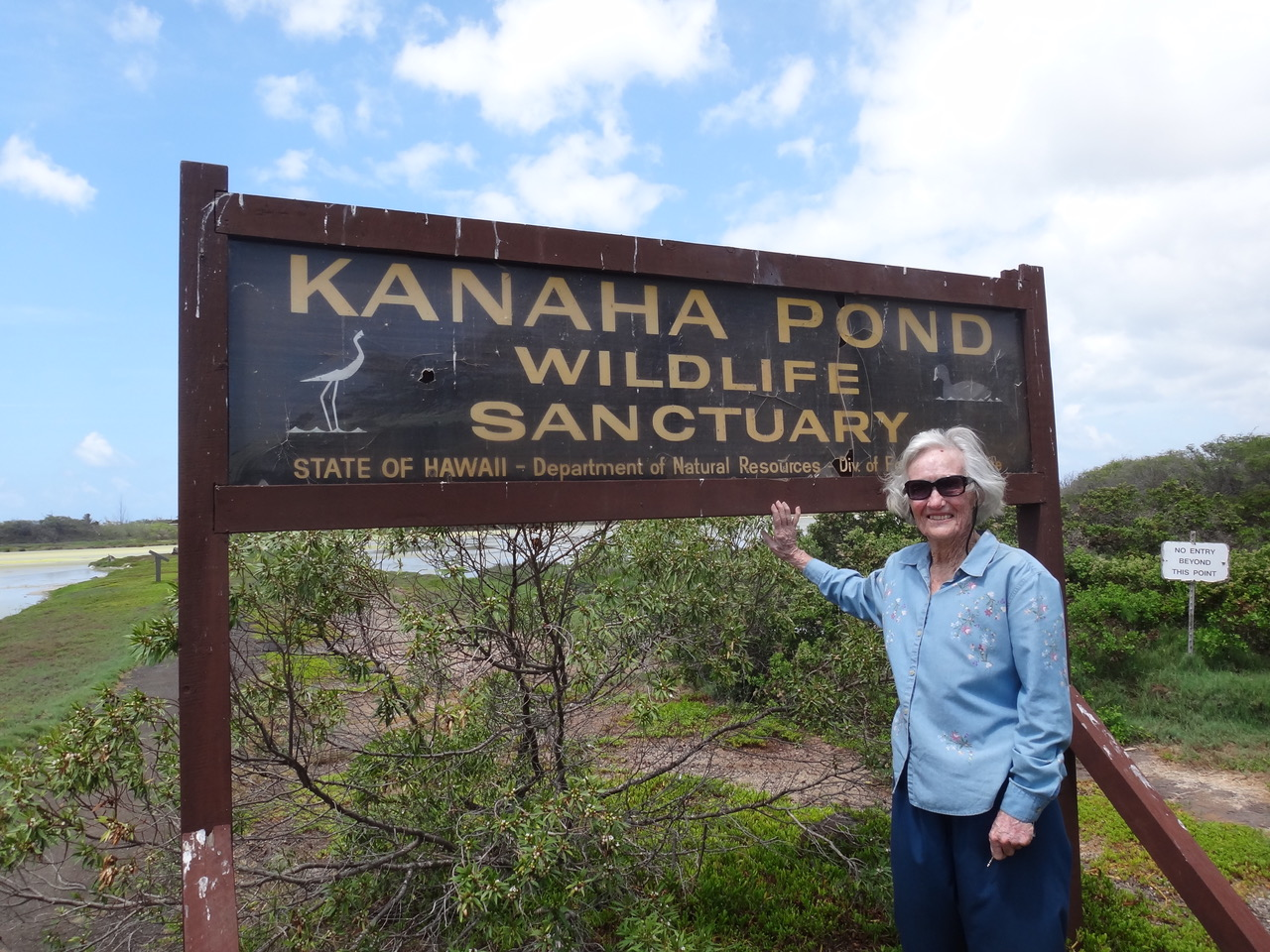
Mary Evanson at the Kanaha Pond of Wildlife Sanctuary.

In the earliest days of her conservation work after relocating to Maui, Evanson worked on the Haleakalā fencing project with the Sierra Club. Evanson continued to be active in conservation projects on Haleakalā. In 1997, she founded the Friends of Haleakalā National Park (FHNP) organization in conjunction with the National Park Service. In addition to serving on the board for a number of years, Evanson initiated the organization's "adopt-a-nene" program, which raised funds for Haleakalā National Park as well as for conservation efforts towards the endangered Nene goose. Evanson often expressed her love for Haleakalā, sharing on multiple occasions that that deep appreciation for the wildlife and witnessing the obvious dwindling health of the mountain was what drove her to create the FHNP organization.

Evanson also served on the board of Environment Hawaiʻi, a monthly newsletter covering issues relating to wildlife/environmental conservation in Hawaiʻi, as a director for 27 years.

The following is a list of organizations, initiatives, and projects for which Evanson is known to have been integral in their establishment and continuation:

- The Native Hawaiian Plant Society
- The Kanaio Natural Area Reserve
- Maui Nui Botanical Gardens
- Friends of Haleakalā National Park
- State Park at Makena
- Kealia Pond

== Legacy, awards, and honors ==
In 1999, Evanson was given the title of Honorary Superintendent of Haleakalā National Park for Outstanding Sustained Contributions, receiving an official hat and access to the superintendent's office. She was also included in the 2010 Selected Women in Maui County presented by the Maui County Committee on the Status of Women as one of many influential women whose had a lasting impact on the community. Evanson's impact was so great that she was posthumously honored by the Friends of Haleakalā National Park in their "Reeser, Evanson, Duvall Memorial Scholarship", where recipients are those continuing studies in a field related to the biology, ecology, and/or the conservation of the Haleakalā National Park ecosystem, furthermore continuing the work that Evanson began.
