= Dorothea M. Ross =

Canadian-American pediatric psychologist

Dorothea Mary Ross (December 24, 1923 – May 7, 2019) was a Canadian-American psychologist and pioneer in the field of pediatric psychology. Ross is best known for her work on social learning at Stanford University in the early 1960s where, together with Albert Bandura and her sister, Sheila Ross, she demonstrated that children learn aggressive behavior through modeling and imitation. Ross was also one of the founders of the Society of Pediatric Psychology.

== Early life and education ==
Ross was born to John and Mildred Ross in Victoria, British Columbia, Canada on December 24, 1923. She received her B.A. from the University of British Columbia in 1956 and her M.A. in Psychology from the University of British Columbia in 1958. Ross received her Ph.D. in Psychology from Stanford University in 1962.

== Research ==
The study that Ross is most well known for is the Bobo doll experiment conducted while a Ph.D. student at Stanford University with her professor and mentor, Albert Bandura, and her sister, Sheila Ross, who was then also a Ph.D. student at Stanford University. Children (mean age 52 months) enrolled in the Stanford University Nursery School were divided into aggressive model experimental groups and non-aggressive model groups. The children in the aggressive model groups saw an adult model aggressive behavior by hitting a Bobo doll (a 5 foot tall inflatable doll) with their fists and with a rubber mallet, kicking the doll, and throwing it, while verbally making aggressive comments such as “kick him.” The children in the non-aggressive model groups saw an adult model quiet play behavior and ignore the Bobo doll. Each experimental group was then taken into a room in another building, as was a control group that had not seen an adult model any behavior. Each group was allowed to play with toys, and then a mild aggression arousal event occurred when the experimenter told the group these were special toys for other children but they could play with any of the toys in the next room. The children moved to another room that had a Bobo doll and other toys in it. The results showed that children in the aggressive model experimental groups demonstrated significantly more physical and verbal aggressive behavior than the children in the non-aggressive model and control groups who displayed almost no aggressive behavior. This confirmed the hypothesis that exposure to aggressive behavior increases the likelihood of engaging in aggressive behavior. Ross continued to conduct research and write, often with her sister, for many years. She held academic and teaching positions at Stanford University School of Medicine and University of California-San Francisco School of Medicine. Her research interests included social learning theory, hyperactivity, childhood bullying, and educating mentally disabled children. Ross was instrumental in starting the Bing Nursery School at Stanford University in 1966, which not only provided an education for young children, but also provided a laboratory for research on young children by Stanford University graduate and undergraduate students. The Bing Nursery School is still operating.

== Society of Pediatric Psychology ==
In the mid-1960s, Ross together with Logan Wright and Lee Salk contacted all medical schools in the United States to gauge interest in starting a special interest group with a focus on children in the American Psychological Association. This group became the Society of Pediatric Psychology (SPP) in 1969, with Wright serving as its first president and Salk as its second president. Despite her role in founding the SPP, Ross never acted as its president, with Ross reporting that the feeling early on in the creation of the SPP was that a female president could alienate potential members who at that time were primarily male.

== Awards ==
In 1979 Ross was awarded the Society of Pediatric Psychology Distinguished Contributions Award for her efforts in founding the Society of Pediatric Psychology. This award is now named the Wright Ross Salk Award for Distinguished Service in Pediatric Psychology in recognition of the contributions of the pioneering efforts of Logan Wright, Dorothea Ross, and Lee Salk in establishing the field of pediatric psychology.

== Later life ==
Ross and her sister, Sheila Ross, moved to Bainbridge Island, Washington in 1989, and she died there at the age of 95.
