= Max Oates =

Australian rules footballer (1942–2019)

Personal information
- Full name: Maxwell Thomas Oates
- Born: 19 April 1942
- Died: 28 May 2019 (aged 77)
- Original team: Kingsville
- Height: 173 cm (5 ft 8 in)
- Weight: 80 kg (176 lb)

Playing career^{1}
Years	Club	Games (Goals)
1960	Footscray	4 (1)
- ^{1} Playing statistics correct to the end of 1960.

Maxwell Thomas Oates (19 April 1942 – 28 May 2019) was an Australian rules footballer who played with Footscray in the Victorian Football League (VFL).
