= R. Ervin Taylor =

American anthropologist

- Born: Royal Ervin Taylor Jr. January 15, 1938; Los Angeles, California, U.S.
- Died: May 9, 2019 (aged 81)
- Education: Pacific Union College; University of California, Los Angeles
- Occupation: Anthropologist

Royal Ervin Taylor Jr. (January 15, 1938 – May 9, 2019) was an American anthropologist.

== Life and career ==
Taylor was born in Los Angeles, California. He attended Pacific Union College, earning his BA degree in history in 1960. He also attended the University of California, Los Angeles (UCLA), earning his master's degrees in history and anthropology. He worked as a research assistant at Willard Libby's Radiocarbon Lab, and earned his PhD degree at UCLA in 1970.

Taylor served as a professor in the department of anthropology at the University of California, Riverside until 2003. During his years as a professor, in 1981, he was named a fellow of the American Association for the Advancement of Science.

== Death ==
Taylor died on May 9, 2019, at the age of 81.
