= Annemarie Pawlik =

Austrian politician (1938–2019)

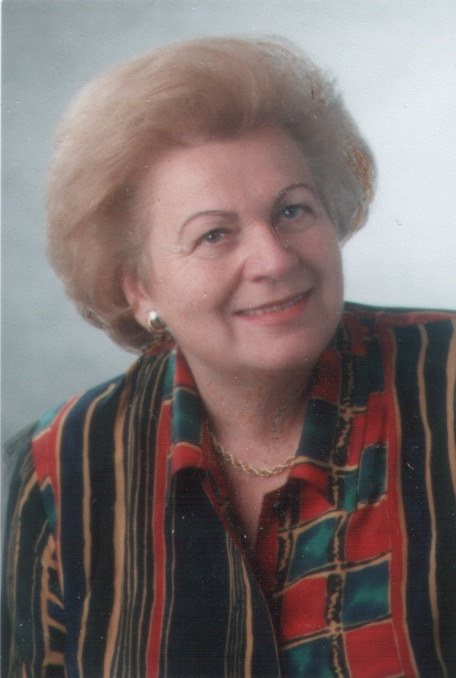
Pawlik in 2011

Annemarie Pawlik (1 June 1938 – 9 May 2019) was an Austrian politician who was a member of the National Council in 1990.

== Life ==
Pawlik was born in Wolfsberg, Carinthia in 1938. From 1979 – 1990 she was a municipal councillor in Klagenfurt. From 6 June until 4 November 1990 she was a member of the Austrian National Council, representing the Social Democratic Party of Austria (SPÖ). She returned to Klagenfurt as city councillor for housing assignment, social and family affairs.

In 2019, Pawlik died at the age of 80. Her husband was Hans Pawlik, who had died in 2012.
