= Liudvikas Saulius Razma =

Lithuanian politician (1938–2019)

Liudvikas Saulius Razma (February 7, 1938 in Plateliai, Plungė – May 19, 2019) was a Lithuanian politician. In 1990 he was among those who signed the Act of the Re-Establishment of the State of Lithuania.
