= Atanasio Ballesteros =

Spanish lawyer and politician (1962–2019)

Member of the Congress of Deputies
- In office 1993 – December 1999
- Constituency: Albacete

Senator

President of the People's Party of Albacete
- In office 2000–2004

Councilor of the Bonete City Council
- In office 1995–2007

Personal details
- Born: October 7, 1962
- Died: May 10, 2019 (aged 56)
- Party: People's Party
- Occupation: Lawyer, politician

Atanasio Ballesteros (7 October 1962 – 10 May 2019) was a Spanish lawyer and politician who served as both Deputy and Senator.

== Biography ==
Shortly after graduating in Law, he opened his first law firm in Almansa and decided to run for Mayor of his town with some friends for the People's Party. He narrowly missed winning the mayoralty by a margin of three votes.

A member of the People's Party, he held various positions within the Party: President of the PP of Albacete (2000–2004); Councilor of the Bonete City Council for eight years (1995–2007); Member of Parliament in two terms, V legislature (1993–1996) and VI legislature (1996–2000). In the latter, he was replaced in December 1999 by Enrique García Martínez.
