= Fabio Calzavara =

Italian politician and entrepreneur (1950–2019)

Fabio Calzavara (21 September 1950 – 28 May 2019) was an Italian entrepreneur and politician, He was the co-founder of Liga Veneta (1980), a federalist party settled in Padua (Veneto region).

He was a member of the board of "European Federalist Union" (UEF) founded in Zurich (Switzerland), from 1982 till 1986. He was a member of the National Council of the "Free Autonomist Entrepreneurs Association" (ALIA) from 1993 – 1994 and later on the "Free European Federalist Entrepreneurs Association (LIFE) from 1995 – 1997.

He was a member of the Italian Parliament and a Foreign Affairs Committee member of Camera dei Deputati from 1996 – 2001. He was a member of the first Inter-parliamentarian Commission between Italy and the Russian Federation from 1997 – 2001.

As an independent consultant, he was accredited at the European Parliament in Bruxelles/Brussels from 2003 – 2004.

He was also elected in the following local public Administrations:

- Member of Province Council of Treviso, Veneto Region (1985 – 1990);
- Member of Common House Council of Montebelluna, Veneto Region (1987 – 1991);
- Member of Common House Council of Mel-Belluno, Veneto Region (1994 – 1998).

In December 2000, he participated in the first public humanitarian aid to Iraq under the embargo, organized by Abbé Pierre and Jean-Marie Benjamin on a special flight from Paris to Baghdad, with 180 participants as parliamentarians, diplomats, journalists, religious workers, and ONG volunteers from France, Italy, Switzerland, the Netherlands, and Great Britain.

From 2005 he lived in Moscow, Russia. He died there on 28 May 2019 of a heart attack, at the age of 68.
