= Bogdan Konopka =

Polish photographer and art critic (1953–2019)

Bogdan Konopka (23 July 1953 — 19 May 2019) was a Polish photographer and art critic, who began taking photographs in the mid-1970s. Born in Dynów, Poland he moved to France in 1989. In 1998 he was awarded the Grand Prix de la Ville de Vevey in the European Photo Competition. Receiver of numerous scholarships e.g. Pro Helvetia (Switzerland 1993), the City of Paris (1994), the French Embassy in Beijing (2005), the French Cultural Institute in Romania and Belarus (in 2000 and 2004). Author of the famous exhibition Paris en gris (Grey Paris) (2000) at the Polish Institute in Paris and The Invisible City (2003) at the Centre Pompidou. Bogdan Konopka preferred to work primarily on large format view camera.

== Selected solo exhibitions ==
- Leçons de Ténèbres, Leica Gallery, Warsaw (2018).
- The magical Wrocław, The City Museum of Wrocław (2012);
- Grey Memory, FF gallery, Łódź (2009);
- Beijing Opera - work in progress, BWA gallery, Bielsko-Biala (2006);
- Faces, Galeria Mała CSW-ZPAF gallery, Warsaw (2004);
- Mutatis mutandis, Transphotographique Festival, Lille, France (2004);
- Autumn in Beijing, FF gallery, Lódź (2004);
- The invisible city, Paris, The Pompidou Center, Paris (2003);
- The invisible city, Paris, Ping Yao Photofestival, China (2003);
- The cryptograms (together with Mariusz Hermanowicz), Entropia gallery, Wrocław & Biennial of Photography and Visual Arts, Liège, Belgium (2002);
- Reconnaissance, Nouveau Theatre d'Angers, France; PF gallery, Poznań; Pennings Gallery, Eindhoven, the Netherlands (2001);
- The Grey Paris (Paris en gris), Month of Photography, The Polish Institute in Paris (Mois de la photo, Institut Anglais, Paris); The Invisible City (La ville invisible), French Cultural Center, Cluj (Centre culturel français, Cluj) & the French Institute (Institut Français), Bucharest; Reconnaissance, Images 2000 Vevey; Cassel Museum (Musee de Cassel) (2000);
- The end and the beginning, Mała Galeria gallery, Warsaw; The Invisible City, Acta International Gallery, Rome; The key, open-closed (Ouvert-ferme), Françoise Paviot Gallery, Paris (1998);
- The invisible city (La ville invisible), Forum de l'Image, Toulouse (1997);
- The invisible city, Paris (La ville invisible, Paris), Arena Gallery, Arles (Galerie Arena, Arles) & Galeria FF Łódź (1995);
- Modern photography in France: from the collection of FNAC, Month of Photography, Moscow (1996);
- The aura of the duration (L'aura de la durée), September of Photography, Reims (1995);
- De rerum natura, The May of Photography, Reims;
- The invisible city, Festival of Photography in Arles; Contacts, The castle in Angers (1994);
- Bogdan Konopka, Rencontres d'Arles festival (1992);
- Secret Gardens (Jardins secrets), Saint Florent-le-Vieil (1993);
- Photographs 1981-1989, Le Triangle gallery, Rennes (1990);
- Meetings with photography, drawing and words, Entropia Gallery, Wrocław (1988);
- The lifetime reality, Galeria Czarna gallery, Legnica (1985),
- "120", Okno gallery, Legnica (1983),
- Empty-Full, Foto-Medium-Art gallery, Wrocław (1982),
- Solidarity, "Na Antresoli" gallery, Wrocław (1981),

== Works in collections ==
- The National Museum of Modern Art - Centre Pompidou, Paris;
- National Library (Bibliothèque nationale de France), Paris;
- National Collection of Contemporary Art, FNAC, Paris;
- Carnavalet Museum (Musée Carnavalet), Paris;
- European House of Photography (Maison européenne de la photographie), Paris;
- Conservatoire du Littoral (Conservatoire du Littoral), Paris;
- Fnac-Photo Collection (Collection Fnac-Photo);
- Center of Photography (Centre photographique de Nice), Nice;
- Gallery Château d'Eau (Château d'eau de Toulouse), Toulouse;
- Regional Center of Photography (Centre régional photographique) Douchy-les-Mines;
- Museum of Fine Arts (Musee des Beaux-Arts d'Angers), Angers;
- Artothéques Nantes, Grenoble, Angers (Artothéques de Nantes, Grenoble, Angers);
- Cassel Museum (Musee de Cassel);
- International Photographic Meetings, Arles (RIP Arles)Museum of Contemporary Art (Musee d'Art Moderne), LodzNational Museum (Musee National), Wroclaw;
- Élysée Museum (Musée de l'Élysée), Lausanne;
- Camera Museum (Musee de l'appareil photographique), Vevey;
- French Cultural Centre (Centre culturel français), Cluj;
- Candace Periche Collection (Collection Candace Periche).
