= Marie-Madeleine Prongué =

Swiss politician (1939-2019)

Marie-Madeleine Prongué (31 July 1939, Hauterive, Fribourg – 23 May 2019) was a Swiss politician who was a member of the Council of States in 1995.

== Life ==
Prongué's political career began as a member of the city council of Porrentruy from 1981 – 1988. She sat in the Parliament of Jura from 1983 until 1994. In 1995 she was the first woman to represent Jura in the Council of States (January – December).

Prongué was a member of the Christian Democratic People's Party of Switzerland, and became the first woman to lead the party in the canton of Jura in 1982. She co-chaired a commission representing women in the Catholic Church in Switzerland, until she resigned in protest alongside most other members of the commission in 2006.

Prongué died in Porrentruy in 2019.
