= Rafael Safarov =

Russian footballer and coach (1947–2019)

- Safarov in 2010

Personal information
- Full name: Rafael Surenovich Safarov
- Date of birth: 8 November 1947
- Place of birth: Tbilisi, Georgian SSR
- Date of death: 26 May 2019 (aged 71)
- Place of death: Moscow, Russia
- Height: 1.70 m (5 ft 7 in)
- Positions: Defender; forward

Senior career*
| Years | Team | Apps | (Gls) |
| 1964 | FC Dinamo Tbilisi | 0 | (0) |
| 1965 | FC Lokomotivi Tbilisi | 3 | (3) |
| 1966–1967 | FC Ararat Yerevan | 13 | (0) |
| 1967 | FC Dinamo Batumi | 13 | (2) |
| 1970 | FC Lokomotivi Tbilisi | 13 | (0) |
| 1971 | FC Ararat Yerevan | 1 | (0) |
| 1972 | FC Shakhtar Horlivka | | |
| 1972–1973 | FC Lori | | |
| 1974–1976 | FC Dynamo Makhachkala | 45 | (4) |

Managerial career
- 1982: FC Dynamo Makhachkala (assistant)
- 1987–1994: RSDYuShOR-2 Makhachkala
- 1995: FC Anzhi Makhachkala
- 1996–2016: RSDYuShOR-2 Makhachkala
- * Club domestic league appearances and goals

Rafael Surenovich Safarov (Russian: Рафаэль Суренович Сафаров; 8 November 1947 – 26 May 2019) was a Russian football coach and a player.

Safarov died of a long-illness in Moscow on 26 May 2019 at the age of 71.
