= Paolo Babbini =

Italian politician (1935–2019)

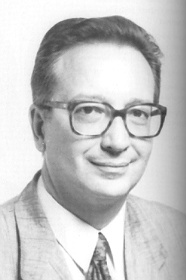
Paolo Babbini

Paolo Babbini (19 August 1935 – 25 May 2019) was an Italian politician for the Socialist Party (PSI). He was born in Bologna, where he served as a municipal councillor for over 25 years. Babbini was elected to three terms in the Chamber of Deputies during Legislature VIII (1979–1983), and consecutive Legislature X (1987–1992) and XI (1992–1994).

Babbini died on 25 May 2019 in Bologna, at the age of 83.
