= Noor van Crevel =

Dutch social worker, feminist and lesbian activist (1929–2019)

- Born: 4 April 1929; The Hauge, Netherlands
- Died: 6 May 2019 (aged 90); Amsterdam, Netherlands
- Occupations: social worker, counsellor in the field of conjugal crime and radical feminist and political lesbian activist
- Organization: Purple September

Noor van Crevel (4 April 1929 – 6 May 2019) was a Dutch social worker who specialised in the field of "conjugal crime." She was also a radical feminist and political lesbian activist. She was one of the founders of the lesbian action group Purple September and the first Blijf van m'n Lijf (Keep Your Hands Off Me) House [nl] in Amsterdam.

== Early life ==
van Crevel was born on 4 April 1929 in The Hague. Her father Marcus van Crevel was a musicologist. She has two sisters and a brother.

van Crevel moved to live in Amsterdam.

== Activism ==
In 1972, van Cravel and her friend Stéphanie de Voogd were among the founders of the radical lesbian action group Purple September. The group advocated for political lesbianism, proclaiming in their newspaper that "being a lesbian would be a political choice." The organisation existed until 1974. In 1989, van Crevel explained to the publication Homologie that the Stonewall riots in America inspired and "formed the germ of the radical-lesbian Paarse September [Purple September] some years later," as she had been in New York in 1969.

van Cravel also worked as a social worker and taught at the Social Academy. She became a specialist counsellor in the field of conjugal crimes and the children of violent marriages. In 1974, van Crevel and Martine van Rappard were among the six women founders of the first Blijf van m'n Lijf (Keep Your Hands Off Me) [nl] House in Amsterdam, which offered a safe place from domestic violence.

In August 1976, van Cravel presented a paper to the conference of the American Sociological Association titled "But What about the Kids?" In 1979 she also contributed an article to the Lesbisch Prachtboek on her experiences of lesbian motherhood.

== Death ==
She died on 6 May 2019 in Amsterdam, when she was 90 years old.
