= George O. Zimmerman =

American scientist (1935–2019)

- Born: October 20, 1935; Katowice, Poland
- Died: May 6, 2019 (aged 83)
- Education: Yale University
- Spouse: Isa Kaftal Zimmerman
- Scientific career
- Fields: Physics, solid state, cryogenics
- Workplaces: Boston University
- Doctoral advisor: Henry Fairbank
- Website: physics.bu.edu/people/show/goz

George Ogurek Zimmerman (October 20, 1935 – May 6, 2019) was a Polish-born American scientist, researcher, inventor, professor of physics and physics department chair at Boston University. Zimmerman achieved his PhD in solid state physics in 1963 at Yale University and came to Boston University in the fall of 1963.

Zimmerman's major contributions in physics include discoveries in Condensed Matter and Solid State Physics, phase transitions at ultra low temperatures, magnetically intercalated graphite compounds, Jahn-Teller materials, and applied superconductivity and modeling. Zimmerman is also well known for his popular lectures on physics, hands-on advanced laboratory lectures and, a Summer Research Internship Program for High School students.

Zimmerman's accomplishments were highlighted in the 17th edition of Who's Who in the World, the 7th through 10th editions of Who's Who in Science and Engineering, and multiple editions of Who's Who in America published between 1986 and 2016. He resided in Boston, where he enjoyed classical music and photography and pursued his research in physics and history until the end of his life. Zimmerman died at the age of 83 in 2019.

== Early life and education ==
George Ogurek Zimmerman was born on October 20, 1935, in Poland. He received his Ph.D. in Physics from Yale University in 1963. His thesis was in experimental low temperature physics.

After a few months as a post-doc with C.T. Lane at Yale, he joined the Physics Department at Boston University His research interests are in Condensed Matter and Solid State Physics. More specifically, some of the topics of interest are phase transitions, some at ultra low temperatures, magnetically intercalated graphite compounds, Jahn-Teller materials, and applied superconductivity and modeling. At Boston University, Zimmerman was department chair for 12 years, chaired the Faculty Council, and was a member and chair of several other influential university committees.

His research collaborations include the Francis Bitter National Magnet Laboratory at MIT, and sabbaticals at Brookhaven National Laboratory, UC San Diego, Leiden University, the Netherlands, Harvard University, Cambridge US, and Imperial College, London.

He was a Member At Large of the Governing Board of the Forum on the History of Physics (FHP) and its Webmaster ad hoc. He conducted many oral history interviews which have been archived at the Niels Bohr Library and Archives at the American Institute of Physics.

He established a Summer Research Internship Program for High School students starting in the early 1980s.

== Biographical Listings ==
- American Men and Women of Science
- Who's Who in America
- Holocaust Survivors
- Who's Who in the East

== Academic career ==
=== Society memberships ===
- American Physical Society
- Materials Research Society
- Society of Sigma Xi
- New York Academy of Sciences
- American Association for the Advancement of Science
- Cryogenic Society of America
- Phi Beta Kappa

=== Discovery ===
- Discovery of low temperature magnetic properties of iron intercalated graphite

== Inventions ==
Zimmerman has developed high temperature superconductor based high current leads, which became the first industrial application of the then newly discovered high temperature ceramic superconductors. Some of Zimmerman's inventions were granted a patent as listed here (patent number and title):

- 5,399,547 Method for increasing the critical current density of high transition temperature superconductors
- 5,376,755 Composite lead for conducting an electric current between 75-80K and 4.5K temperatures
- 5,296,459 Method for making an electrically conductive contact for joining high T_{c} superconductors.
- 5,131,582 Adhesive metallic alloys and methods of their use
- 5,098,656 Alloys for electrically joining superconductors to themselves, to normal conductors, and to semi-conductors
- 4,966,142 Method for electrically joining superconductors to themselves, to normal conductors, and to semi-conductors
- 4,837,377 Rubbery, Electrically Non-Conductive, and Intrinsically Magnetic Graphite Intercalation Compounds and Methods for Their Making

== Selected publications ==
Professor Zimmerman has published more than 100 scientific articles, below are a selected few:

- C.E. Chase & George O. Zimmerman (1973). "Measurements of P-V-T and Critical Indices of He^{3}". Journal of Low Temperature Physics. 11: 551. doi:10.1007/BF00654447. S2CID 123038029.
- Michael D. Kaplan & George O. Zimmerman (2008). "Paramagnetic properties of XY-ordered Jahn-Teller crystals". Physical Review B. 77 (10) 104426. Bibcode:2008PhRvB..77j4426K. doi:10.1103/physrevb.77.104426.
- George O. Zimmerman (2010). "Current induced transport properties in bulk YBCO and BSCCO". American Physical Society. March Meeting 2010: 628.
- Y.Z. Negm; M.Z. Tahar; George O. Zimmerman & Robert E. Powers (1992). "Low Resistance and Superconducting High Current Electrical Contacts to Bulk YBCO and NiTi-Cu Superconductors". Materials Research Society. 1992 MRS Fall Meeting, Boston: 89.
- Alvaro Kaplan; M.Z. Tahar & George O. Zimmerman (1990). "Contact Between Indium Alloys and High T_{c} Superconductors". Bull. Amer. Phys. Soc. 35: 295.
- Alvaro Kaplan; George O. Zimmerman & Dean S. Edmonds, Jr. (1986). "Self-balancing resistance bridges". Review of Scientific Instruments. 57 (11): 2895–2897. Bibcode:1986RScI...57.2895K. doi:10.1063/1.1139013.
- George O. Zimmerman (2003). "Superconductivity: The Promise and Reality". International Journal of Modern Physics B. 17 (18n20): 3698. doi:10.1142/S0217979203021642.
- George O. Zimmerman & Isa Kaftal Zimmerman (2015). "Where Do Our Students Encounter Materials: Everywhere and Rarely". Materials Research Society. 1762 Symp. Online Proceedings Library mrsf14-1762-aaa06-07: 62–66. doi:10.1557/opl.2015.259.

== Books ==
Some of his latest research and studies are in his publications:

- Elastic Anomalies in Jahn-Teller Crystals with Competing Structural Orderings. Journal of Physics: Conference Series 04/2013; 428(1):2033-.
- Strong Electron Correlation by Virtual Phonon Exchange in Jahn-Teller Crystals. 02/2012.
- Competition of Structural Orderings in Presence of Magnetic Interactions. 03/2010.
- Giant Dynamic Magnetostriction in Colossal Magnetoresistance Manganites with Single and Double MnO_6, Plenum, New York (1985),03/2001.
- Magnetic Non-Linearity Caused by Jahn-Teller Distortion Correlation in Manganites.
- Magnetostructural Properties of Colossal Magnetoresistance Manganites Under External Magnetic Fields and Uniaxial Pressure

== Lectures ==
- The 50th Anniversary of the Prediction of Superfluidity of He3
