= Joseph Cottet =

Swiss politician (1923–2019)

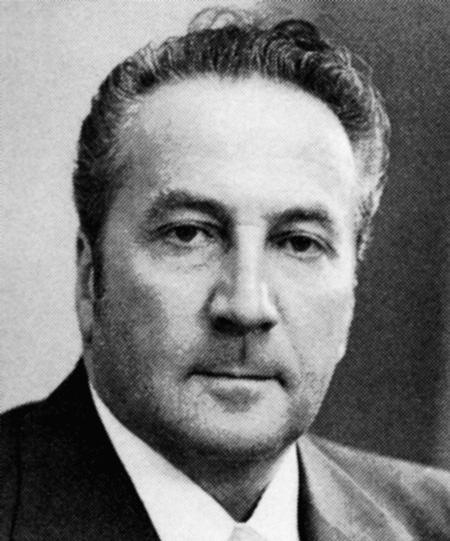
Joseph Cottet

Joseph Cottet (14 April 1923 – 23 May 2019) was a Swiss politician. Born in Bossonnens, he served as a member of the Grand Council of Fribourg, representing the Party of Farmers, Traders and Independents during the period 1957–71. In 1983, Cottet was elected to the National Council as a member of the People's Party, serving until 1987. He died in 2019, at the age of 96.
