= Kurt Lang and Gladys Engel Lang =

American sociologists

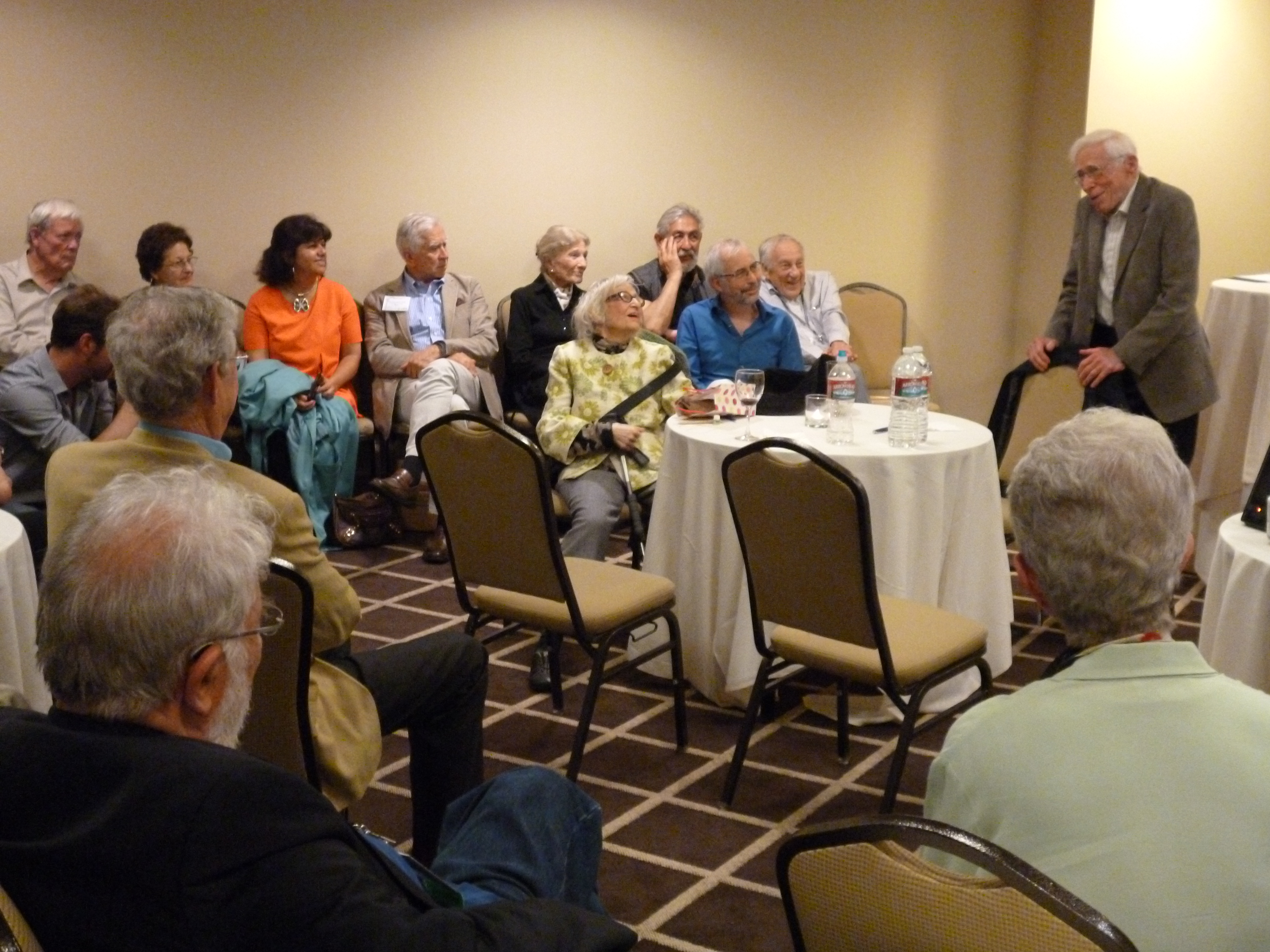
Kurt Lang and Gladys Engel Lang during the homage they received at the International Communication Association conference held in Seattle in May 2014.

Kurt Lang (January 25, 1924 – May 1, 2019) and Gladys Engel Lang (August 7, 1919 – March 23, 2016) were American sociologists and communications theorists whose early work is associated with the Chicago School. Their research engaged many contemporary problems in communications including the effect of televised politics on the formation of public opinion. They collaborated on a number of intellectual projects after publishing their award-winning seminal essay, "MacArthur Day in Chicago", in 1953.

Kurt Lang had a lifelong interest in art, and his early teachers recognized his own talent as a draftsman and artist. By the 1970s, he and his wife, Gladys, began collecting works of art, often from flea markets and out-of-the way antique sellers. They developed a particular interest in American, British, French, and German prints, and gradually amassed a collection of more than 1,400 prints, drawings, and watercolors – including many by women artists – primarily focused on the painter-etcher movement between the 1860s and World War II as well as the ravages of the Great War and more recent East German artists.

As sociologists, the Langs also sought to understand the process whereby some artists came to be considered worth remembering and others did not, a pursuit that led them to write Etched in Memory: The Building and Survival of Artistic Reputation. In 2014, the Smith College Museum of Art was delighted to acquire the Gladys Engel Lang and Kurt Lang Collection. In September 2018, the museum launched its first major exhibition of prints drawn almost entirely from the Lang collection and titled “No Man’s Land: Prints from the Front Lines of WWI.”

== Biography ==
Kurt Lang was born in Berlin, Germany, in 1924 and with his family fled the Nazis to come to New York in April 1936. He served with the US Army in Europe, where as a German speaker he served in the Counter Intelligence Corps. After World War II, he returned to Berlin and worked as a research associate on denazification in the Intelligence Branch of the US Military Government's Information Control Division. In fall 1947, he matriculated at the University of Chicago as a freshman and in 1953 received his doctorate for his research on the MacArthur Day Parade in Chicago. He later worked for the Canadian Broadcasting Corporation, taught at Queens College, Columbia University, University of California at Berkeley, Stony Brook University, and the University of Washington in Seattle.

In Atlantic City in 1919, Gladys Engel Lang was born to offspring of recent immigrants from Eastern Europe. She was the first in her family to get a college degree, let alone graduate from high school. After graduating from the University of Michigan in 1940 and getting her master's from the University of Washington in 1942, she worked at the Washington, D.C., Office of War Information where she primarily produced research on the medium of radio, before moving on to the Office of Strategic Services. In OSS she was stationed in London, Italy, and China from 1943 to 1949. After this, she turned her attention to academia and received her doctorate from the University of Chicago in 1954 for her research on the 1952 political party conventions. During her time at Chicago, she worked with the Committee on Communication.

The Langs met and married as graduate students in sociology at the University of Chicago in 1950. Gladys died on March 23, 2016, at the age of 96. Kurt died on May 1, 2019, at age 95.

== MacArthur Day in Chicago ==
Originally published as “The Unique Perspective of Television and its Effects: A Pilot Study” in the American Sociological Review, this essay helped launch the Langs’ academic careers and signaled the beginning of a longstanding interest in the role played by the news media in shaping political outcomes and public opinion.

Billed as a pilot study, the Langs’ observations culminated in the pivotal realization that MacArthur Day as it unfolded on the streets and on television screens was markedly different. Using evidence collected from 31 stationed observers and two perspectives on the televised broadcast of the event, five key ideas are explored in this essay:

1. The Nature of Television: noting a disconnect between the casual crowds and the spectacular drama presented on television, the Langs proposed that the technological apparatuses of television and narrative devices such as commentary and different shot sequences made it possible to construct MacArthur Day in a way that is different from reality.

The crowds expected a “wild spectacle” but found the event was a “great let-down”. On the other hand, television viewers “saw and heard exactly what they expected to see”. Television made it possible to rearrange the event to meet those audience expectations”.

2. Television had a “personalizing” effect: observing how the coverage focused on MacArthur’s personal affectations, they argued that this selectivity made it “possible for each viewer to see himself in a personal relationship to the general” in a way that was absent for the crowds.

3. Crowds versus the Audience: the Langs argued that there was a difference between being a spectator and viewing the event on television. Where people in the crowds were able to converse and deliberate ideas about the spectacle at hand, viewers at home were left atomized and vulnerable to the momentary messages about politics and public opinion conveyed on television.

4. Reciprocal Effects: far from acting as a simple transmitter of information, television helped co-create the event. The crowd was conscious of, and performed for, the cameras.

5. The Landslide Effect: marking “news and special events” as distinguished genres, the Langs worried that the patriotic unanimity conveyed through the televised event had presented a “false impression” of public opinion about General MacArthur and the president. These images of public sentiment are inserted into the political process, other media, and public discourse in a way that can quell dissent. They termed this cumulative process, which reproduces certain assumptions made about reality, the “landslide effect”.

Some scholars later credited this essay and their later works for laying crucial observations leading to the theorization of a new genre of “media events”.
