= Gerardo Traverso =

Uruguayan footballer (1975–2019)

Personal information
- Full name: Gerardo Adrián Traverso Píriz
- Date of birth: 7 October 1975
- Place of birth: Montevideo, Uruguay
- Date of death: 17 May 2019 (aged 43)
- Height: 1.83 m (6 ft 0 in)
- Position: Forward

Youth career
- Rubio Ñú

Senior career*
Years	Team	Apps	(Gls)
1992	Rubio Ñú		
1993–1997	Nacional (Paraguay)		
1997	Tianjin TEDA		
–	San Lorenzo		
–	Monterrey		
–2000	Durazno		
2000	→ Barcelona (loan)		
2001	Guaraní		
2002	Dundee	2	(0)
2002	Cerro Porteño		
2003	Sportivo Luqueño		
2003–2004	Tacuary		
- * Club domestic league appearances and goals

Gerardo Adrián Traverso Píriz (7 October 1975 – 17 May 2019) was an Uruguayan football player.

== Club career ==
Traverso moved to Paraguay as a youth player and began his professional career with Rubio Ñú before moving to Nacional in the Primera División de Paraguay. He played on loan for Barcelona in Serie A de Ecuador. He also had a brief spell with Dundee in the Scottish Premier League.

Traverso's career ended following a serious injury sustained in an automobile crash in Asunción in May 2004. His wife was also injured in the accident.
