= Pinoke McIntyre =

Canadian ice hockey player (1934–2019)

- Born: September 27, 1934 Trail, British Columbia, Canada
- Died: May 2, 2019 (aged 84) Trail, British Columbia, Canada
- Height: 5 ft 5 in (165 cm)
- Weight: 145 lb (66 kg; 10 st 5 lb)
- Position: Left wing
- Shot: Left
- Played for: Trail Smoke Eaters; Rossland Warriors
- National team: Canada
- Playing career: 1950–1971
Medal record
Men's ice hockey
| Gold medal – first place | 1961 Switzerland | Ice hockey |

Pinoke McIntyre (September 27, 1934 – May 2, 2019) was a Canadian ice hockey player with the Trail Smoke Eaters. He won a gold medal at the 1961 World Ice Hockey Championships in Switzerland. He also played with the Rossland Warriors.
