= Judith Hockaday =

British neurologist

Judith Hockaday FRCP
- Born: Judith Mary Fitzsimons; 19 September 1929; Cardiff, Wales, UK
- Died: 24 May 2019 (aged 89)
- Education: St Mary's Catholic School, Bishop's Stortford
- Alma mater: University of Cambridge; St Mary's Hospital, London
- Spouse: Derek Hockaday
- Scientific career
- Workplaces: Great Ormond Street Hospital; Massachusetts General Hospital; University of Oxford; Addenbrooke's Hospital; St Mary's Hospital, London; John Radcliffe Hospital
- Thesis: The results of treatment of tuberculous meningitis (1960)

Judith Mary Hockaday (née Fitzsimons) FRCP (19 September 1929 – 24 May 2019) was a British neurologist who contributed to the development of paediatric neurology. She contributed extensively to understanding of childhood migraine, and was a founding member of the British Paediatric Neurology Association.

== Early life and education ==
Hockaday was born in Cardiff. Her parents were both Irish physicians: her mother a general practitioner and her father a surgeon. She was educataed at St Mary's Catholic School, Bishop's Stortford and Lady Margaret House, Cambridge. She attended Girton College, Cambridge, where she studied the Natural Sciences Tripos funded by an exhibition scholarship. She was clinically trained at St Mary's Hospital, London. and awarded her PhD from the University of Cambridge in 1960.

== Research and career ==
Hockaday worked in general medicine at St Mary's Hospital, and as a house surgeon at Addenbrooke's Hospital. Although she had originally intended to specialise as a chest physician, Hocakaday started researching tuberculosis for her PhD. She was appointed as a registrar in the tuberculous meningitis unit in what became the John Radcliffe Hospital Department of Neurology. At the time, the unit was spread over two hospitals, the Osler Pavilion and the Military Hospital. The unit was directed by Honor Smith, and the military section was staffed by both military personnel and civilian consultants. There, Hocakaday met her husband, Derek Hockaday, who was part of the Royal Army Medical Corps. She completed her doctorate on the treatment of tuberculous meningitis in 1960, and joined the University of Oxford Department of Neurology as a registrar. This position involved being responsible for inpatients at Stoke Mandeville Hospital.

After the birth of her first child, Hocakday became interested in paediatric neurology. She joined the paediatric neurology ward service at the Massachusetts General Hospital, where her husband was completing a fellowship. She trained in electroencephalography. She eventually returned to Oxford, where she became interested in migraine. She was made an honorary registrar at Great Ormond Street Hospital, where she researched migraine in childhood. She was awarded the British Migraine Association gold medal for research in 1977.

Hockaday specialised in headache, epilepsy and language disorders. She developed a hub-and-spoke neurological service in the Thames Valley. She was a founding member of the British Paediatric Neurology Association.

=== Selected publications ===
- Migraine in childhood; and other non-epileptic paroxysmal disorders.
- Electroencephalographic Change in Acute Cerebral Anoxia from Cardiac or Respiratory Arrest
- Basilar migraine in childhood
- Childhood mitochondrial myopathy with ophthalmoplegia

=== Awards and honours ===
She was awarded Membership of the Royal Colleges of Physicians of the United Kingdom in 1955.

== Personal life ==
Hockaday had three children. She dedicated her retirement to gardening, botanical art, travelling and community work. Hocakday died of peritoneal carcinoma in 2019.
