= Thembinkosi Mbamba =

South African footballer (1995–2019)

Personal information
- Date of birth: 9 September 1995
- Date of death: 25 May 2019 (aged 23)
- Position: Striker

Senior career*
Years	Team	Apps	(Gls)
2018–2019	TS Galaxy	9	(1)
- * Club domestic league appearances and goals

Thembinkosi Mbamba (9 September 1995 – 25 May 2019) was a South African professional soccer player who played as a striker.

== Career ==
Mbamba played for TS Galaxy of the National First Division, with whom he won the 2018–19 Nedbank Cup in May 2019.

He died in a car accident in the early hours of 25 May 2019.
