= Mary Doakes =

American educator (1936–2019)

- Born: Mary Taylor; May 22, 1936; Jefferson County, West Virginia, U.S.
- Died: May 1, 2019 (aged 82); Ranson, West Virginia, U.S.
- Other names: Mary T. Doakes, Mary Taylor Doakes
- Occupations: Teacher, education administrator
- Years active: 1963–1989
- Known for: first African-American school administrator in Jefferson County, West Virginia

Mary Doakes (May 22, 1936 – May 1, 2019) was an African-American school teacher who became the first black administrator of a school in Jefferson County, West Virginia.

== Early life ==
Mary Taylor was born on May 22, 1936, in Jefferson County, West Virginia, to Harriet Elizabeth (née Dotson) and Beverly D. Taylor. She grew up as the only daughter in the family with five boys and attended the historic Page-Jackson High School, the first publicly funded black school in the county. After her graduation, Taylor enrolled in a teaching program at Storer College. The college closed its doors in 1955, and Taylor transferred her credits to Shepherd College, graduating cum laude with her bachelor's degree in 1957. She enrolled in classes at Michigan State University in East Lansing to further her education and transferred to West Virginia University completing her master's degree in Elementary Administration in 1963.

== Career ==
After completing her education, Taylor began working at the Eagle Avenue Elementary School. Soon thereafter, she married Arthur C. Doakes. The couple had three children: Stefanie and Stefan, and Arthur Jr. After several years, she transferred to her alma mater Page-Jackson High School. In 1971, Doakes was promoted to assistant principal at Charles Town Junior High School.

On 25 February 1974, Doakes became the first black administrator in Jefferson County, when she was promoted as the principal of Charles Town Junior High School. She served in the post until her retirement in 1989. She was one of the people featured in a collection of photographs published by the Jefferson County Black History Preservation Society's volume, African Americans of Jefferson County.

== Death and legacy ==
Doakes died on May 1, 2019, in Ranson, West Virginia, and a memorial service to her memory was held on May 11, 2019.
