= Raúl Diniz =

Portuguese weightlifter (1951–2019)

Personal information
- Full name: Raúll Manuel Correia Diniz
- Nationality: (Portugal) Portuguese
- Born: 9 February 1951 Carcavelos, Cascais, Portugal
- Died: 25 May 2019 (aged 68)
- Height: 154 cm (5 ft 1 in)
- Weight: 52 kg (115 lb)

Sport
- Sport: Weightlifting
- Weight class: Flyweight; Bantamweight

Raúl Diniz (9 February 1951 – 24 May 2019) was a Portuguese weightlifter. He competed at the 1972 Summer Olympics, the 1980 Summer Olympics and the 1984 Summer Olympics.
