= Tohir Malik =

Uzbek writer (1946–2019)

- Born: Tohir Malik; 27 December 1946; Tashkent, Uzbek SSR, Soviet Union
- Died: 16 May 2019 (aged 72)
- Occupation: Novelist
- Writing career
- Period: 1960–2019
- Genres: Detective, scientific fiction
- Notable work: Shaytanat series
- Website: tohirmalik.uz

Tohir Malik (27 December 1946 – 16 May 2019) was an Uzbek novelist and story writer. He was awarded Uzbek National Writer in 2000. Multiple films were made based on his novels and fictions, such as Last bullet (Uzbek language|Uzbek: So’nggi o’q) in 1994.

== Biography ==
Tohir Malik was born on 27 December 1946, in Tashkent, in a family of military workers. Malik faced difficulties in his childhood in the aftermath of World War II. These difficulties kept Malik from attending secondary school. He instead learned from his older brothers and sisters. Uzbek writer and interpreter Mirzakalon Ismoiliy was his uncle, who was killed by the government in 1949.

Tohir's first story was written and published in 1960, Gulxan magazine. In 1963 he entered Tashkent State University and studied journalism. Malik practiced writing short tales, and started writing in fantasy genre, which was new to Uzbekistan. As a student he wrote "Hikmat afandining o'limi", the first ever fantasy fiction story in the history of Uzbekistan. His novels and stories were translated into Russian and other languages. So'nggi o'q led to a 7 part film, while Shaytanata generated a 20 episode series.

After graduation Tohir taught in many schools, and became the department director of "Lenin uchquni". He then worked in Republican tele-radio union, for publisher Gulistan and for the Uzbek writers union.

He died in 2019.

== Contributions ==
Tohir's work became famous in Uzbekistan. His novel Shaytanat is read in former Soviet Union countries. He helped develop the detective genre in Uzbekistan, penning Falak, Somon yo’li elchilari, Tiriklik suvi, Zaharli g’ubor (rereleased as “Vasvasa”), Chorrahada qolgan odamlar (rereleased as Devona), Charxpalak, Qaldirg’och (rereleased as Savohil), Bir ko’cha bir kecha, So’nggi o’q, Shaytanat, Ov, Murdalar gapirmaydi, Iblis devori, Talvasa, Mehmon tuyg'ular, Jinoyatning uzun yo'li, Odamiylik mulki, Eng kichik jinoyat and Tilla kalamush

== Honors ==
Tohir was awarded "Uzbekistan's national writer" in 2000 by the edict of President Islam Karimov.

== See also ==
- G'afur G'ulom
- Abdulla Qahhor
- Abdulla Oripov
- Cho'lpon
