= Andrei Guzienko =

Ukrainian footballer (1964–2019)

Personal information
- Full name: Andrei Svyatoslavovich Guzienko
- Date of birth: 15 April 1964
- Place of birth: Magnitogorsk, Soviet Union
- Date of death: 14 May 2019 (aged 55)
- Place of death: Chernivtsi, Ukraine
- Height: 1.82 m (6 ft 0 in)
- Position: Forward

Youth career
- RSDYUSHOR Frunze

Senior career*
Years	Team	Apps	(Gls)
1981	Semetey Frunze	15	(3)
1982	Alga Frunze	28	(8)
1983	TSOR Frunze	18	(4)
1983	Burevestnik Frunze		
1984	CSKA Moscow	8	(1)
1985–1986	Chornomorets Odesa	4	(0)
1986	Prykarpattya Ivano-Frankivsk	27	(2)
1987–1990	Bukovyna Chernivtsi	181	(46)
1990–1992	Bečej		
1992–1993	Lada Chernivtsi	10	(4)
1993–1994	Dnister Zalishchyky	2	(0)
- * Club domestic league appearances and goals

Andrei Svyatoslavovich Guzienko (Russian: Андрей Святославович Гузиенко; 15 April 1964 – 14 May 2019) was a Ukrainian footballer who played as a forward.

== Club career ==
Born in Magnitogorsk, Chelyabinsk Oblast, Russian SSR, Soviet Union, he started playing in the football academy of RSDYUSHOR Frunze. He then started playing as senior in early 1980s in Frunze clubs Semetey, Alga and TSOR in the Soviet third league. In 1984, he moved to CSKA Moscow and played in the Soviet First League. In 1985 and 1986 he played in Soviet top tier with Chornomorets Odesa. Then, after a season-long spell with Prykarpattya Ivano-Frankivsk, he played four seasons with Bukovyna Chernivtsi. In 1990, he moved abroad to Yugoslavia and joined Serbian club FK Bečej playing with them two seasons in the Yugoslav Second League. In 1992, he returned to, now independent, Ukraine, and played with Lada Chernivtsi and Dnister Zalishchyky before retiring.
