= Edmund Outslay =

Edmund Outslay (January 25, 1952 – May 20, 2019) was a Deloitte / Michael Licata Endowed Professor of Taxation at Michigan State University. He acquired his undergraduate degree from Furman University and his MBA and Ph.D from the University of Michigan. During his career in academia he achieved several awards including the American Taxation Association/Deloitte Teaching Innovation Award, Distinguished Faculty Award, Presidential Award for Outstanding Community Service, Withrow Teacher-Scholar Award, plus Curricular Service-Learning and Civic Engagement Award.

In his lifetime Outslay testified before Congress, was the co-author of several tax textbooks including McGraw-Hill's Taxation of Individuals and Entities and was often cited in the media including The Wall Street Journal.

Outside of Academia, he was an ardent baseball enthusiast and community serviceman. He was a volunteer coach at East Lansing High School for 24 years and had won in 2003 the AFLAC National Assistant Coach of the Year award. In addition, he volunteered at Lansing's Meals on Wheels program and MSU's Volunteer Income Tax Assistance (VITA) program.
