= Héctor Enrique Olivares =

Argentinian politician (1958–2019)

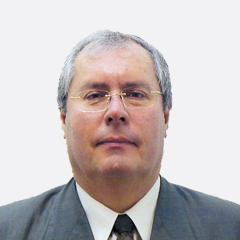
Héctor Enrique Olivares

Héctor Enrique Olivares (18 February 1958 − 12 May 2019) was an Argentine politician, engineer and agricultural producer. A representative of the Radical Civic Union (UCR), he served as a member of the Chamber of Deputies from 2015 until his death in 2019. He was born in La Rioja.

On 9 May 2019, Olivares and his adviser, Miguel Marcelo Yadón, were critically wounded after being shot in Buenos Aires. The men were transferred to nearby Hospital Ramos Mejía, where Yadón was pronounced dead on arrival. Olivares died on 12 May 2019.
