= Dionisio Gallarati =

Italian mathematician (1923–2019)

- Born: May 8, 1923; Savona, Italy.
- Died: May 13, 2019 (aged 96); Albaro, Genoa, Italy.
- Education: University of Pisa; Istituto Nazionale di Alta Matematica
- Occupation: Mathematician
- Employer: University of Genova
- Known for: Algebraic geometry research

Dionisio Gallarati (May 8, 1923 – May 13, 2019) was an Italian mathematician, who specialized in algebraic geometry. He was a major influence on the development of algebra and geometry at the University of Genova.

== Life ==
Born May 8th 1923 in Savona, Italy, Gallarati joined the University of Pisa in 1941. His studies being interrupted by the war, he received his first degree from Genova.

He started his research career at l'Istituto Nazionale di Alta Matematica in Rome, where he was taught by Giacomo Albanese, Leonard Roth, Leonida Tonelli, E. G. Togliatti, Beniamino Segre and Francesco Severi.

He took a post at Genova in 1947, where he stayed until he retired in 1987.

== Research ==
Gallarati published 64 papers between 1951 and 1996.

Important amongst his research was the study of surfaces in P^{3} with multiple isolated singularities. His lower bounds for maximal number of nodes of surfaces of degree n stood for a long time, and exact solutions for large n were still unknown in 2001.

In Grassmannian geometry he extended Segre's bound "for the number of linearly independent complexes containing the curve in the Grassmannian corresponding to the tangent lines of a nondegenerate projective curve." He extended the results to arbitrarily dimensioned varieties' tangent spaces, to higher degree complexes, and to arbitrary curves in Grassmannians corresponding to degenerate scrolls.

== Works ==
Gallarati wrote three books and 64 papers, in algebraic geometry, differential geometry, functional analysis, group theory, and biography. His co-authors include Giulio Aruffo, Mauro C. Beltrametti, Maria Teresa Bonardi, Gabriella Canonero, Ettore Carletti, Enrica Casazza, Mario G. Galli, Aldo Monti Iandelli, Giacomo Bragadin, Giorgio Luigi Olcese, Giulio Passatore, Luigi Robert, Aldo Rollero, Michele Sarà, Giulio Scarsi and Maria Ezia Serpico.

33 of his papers are collected in Dionisio Gallarati: Collected Papers of Dionisio Gallarati Kinston, Ontario, 2000, ed A. V. Geramita.
