= Robert G. Craddock =

American politician (1931–2019)

Member of the Nevada General Assembly for the 20th district
- In office November 1972 – November 1988

Personal details
- Born: April 24, 1931 Church Hill, Tennessee, U.S.
- Died: May 4, 2019 (aged 88) Nevada, U.S.
- Party: Democratic
- Spouse: B. Louise Moore
- Profession: construction supervisor

Robert Glen Craddock (April 24, 1931 – May 4, 2019) was an American politician who was a Democratic member of the Nevada General Assembly. He was a construction supervisor.

Educated: Church Hill High, Church Hill, Tennessee; Memorial High School, San Diego, California; engineering trade school, Massena, New York.

Children: Jay Gregory and Robert Michael.

Military: U.S. Navy, 4 years. Damage Control; Deep Sea Diver

Recreation: Hiking, hunting and fishing.

Legislative Service: Nevada Assembly, 1973-79-four regular sessions of the legislature.

Craddock died on May 4, 2019, at the age of 88.

== Affiliations ==
- Carpenters Local No. 1780; president,
- Sunrise Manor Protective Association.
- Personal and Professional Achievements:
- Supervised multimillion dollar construction projects;
- Vocational teaching certificates.
- Nevada First Aids Legislation
- Chairman of the Education Committee;

== Committees ==
- Taxation, Government Affairs, Health & Welfare, Assessment & Taxation of Geothermal Resources & Rectification of Nevada Education Laws
