= Thomas Wainwright (cricketer) =

English cricketer (1940–2019)

Personal information
- Full name: Thomas Dodsworth Wainwright
- Born: 12 November 1940; Bombay, Bombay Presidency, British India
- Died: 28 May 2019 (aged 78); Fort Myers, Florida, United States
- Nickname: Dod
- Batting: Right-handed

Career statistics
Competition	First-class
Matches	1
Runs scored	37
Batting average	18.50
100s/50s	0/0
Top score	28
Catches/stumpings	0/–
- Source: Cricinfo, 24 June 2019

Thomas Dodsworth "Dod" Wainwright (12 November 1940 – 28 May 2019) was an English first-class cricketer, schoolmaster and investment banker.

Wainwright was born at Bombay in British India in November 1940. He was educated at St Andrew's Prep School in Eastbourne, then at Eastbourne College and Emmanuel College, Cambridge.

He played a single first-class cricket match for L. C. Stevens' XI against Cambridge University at Eastbourne in 1961. Batting twice in the match, he was dismissed in the L. C. Stevens' XI first-innings for 28 runs by Tony Pearson, while in their second-innings he was dismissed by the same bowler for 9 runs.

Wainwright returned to St Andrew's as a teacher, teaching there for two years before joining Eastbourne College, where he taught economics and history from 1965 to 1969. He returned once more to St Andrew's in 1969, this time as headmaster, and served in this position until 1984. He then began a career as an investment banker and worked for Smith-Barney in Cleveland, Ohio.

Wainwright retired to Florida, where he died in a hospice at Fort Myers in May 2019. He was survived by his wife, Annie, and their two children.
