= Iris Meléndez =

Puerto Rican lawyer and prosecutor (died 2019)

Iris Meléndez Vega
- Born: Ponce, Puerto Rico
- Died: May 14, 2019; Bayamón, Puerto Rico
- Education: University of Puerto Rico at Río Piedras
- Occupations: Lawyer, prosecutor
- Years active: 1976–2019
- Known for: Chief Prosecutor of Puerto Rico; Independent Special Prosecutor (2010–2019)

Iris Meléndez Vega (died 14 May 2019) was a lawyer and prosecutor from Puerto Rico.

== Biography ==
Meléndez Vega was born and raised in the town of Ponce, Puerto Rico. She studied commerce at the University of Puerto Rico at Río Piedras and worked as a legal secretary until she completed her law studies.

Her first professional position was as a lawyer in the Department of Justice in 1976. She progressed to work in a range of positions including as an officer in the Criminal Division, Assistant Prosecutor, District Attorney of Bayamón and San Juan, and Chief Prosecutor. She retired in 2006. In 2010 she became an independent special prosecutor.

Meléndez Vega died of cancer in her residence in Bayamon on May 14, 2019. At the time of her death, she was actively working on the prosecution case against Justice Secretary Wanda Vazquez Garced.

== See also ==
- List of Puerto Ricans
