= Ned Quinn =

Irish hurler (1923–2019)

Personal information
- Born: May 1923 Ardrahan, County Galway, Ireland
- Died: 22 May 2019 (aged 96) Galway, County Galway, Ireland
- Height: 5 ft 10 in (178 cm)

Sport
- Sport: Hurling
- Position: Left wing-back
Club
- Years: Club
- Ardrahan
Club titles
- Galway titles: 1
Inter-county
- Years: County
- 1949–1954: Galway
Inter-county titles
- All-Irelands: 0
- NHL: 1

Edward Quinn (May 1923 – 22 May 2019) was an Irish hurler who played as a left wing-back for the Galway senior team.

Born in Ardrahan, County Galway, Quinn first arrived on the inter-county scene at the age of seventeen when he first linked up with the Galway minor team. He made his senior debut during the 1949-50 league. Quinn immediately became a regular member of the starting fifteen, and won one National Hurling League medal. He was an All-Ireland runner-up on one occasion.

Quinn was a member of the Connacht inter-provincial team on a number of occasions, however, he never won a Railway Cup medal. At club level he is a one-time championship medallist with Ardrahan.

Corless retired from inter-county hurling following the conclusion of the 1954 championship.

Quinn had two daughters; Irene and Ena. He died in Galway on 22 May 2019, at the age of 96.

== Honours ==
=== Player ===
Ardrahan

- Galway Senior Hurling Championship (1): 1949

Galway

- National Hurling League (1): 1950-51
