= Nick Peters (cricketer) =

English cricketer (1968–2019)

Personal information
- Full name: Nicholas Howard Peters
- Born: 21 February 1968; Guildford, Surrey, England
- Died: 20 May 2019 (aged 51)
- Batting: Right-handed
- Bowling: Right-arm fast-medium
- Role: Bowler

Domestic team information
- Years: Team
- 1988–1989: Surrey

Career statistics
Competition	First-class	List A
Matches	16	12
Runs scored	101	7
Batting average	10.10	3.50
100s/50s	0/0	0/0
Top score	25*	4*
Balls bowled	2,163	551
Wickets	40	13
Bowling average	31.15	27.69
5 wickets in innings	1	0
10 wickets in match	1	0
Best bowling	6/31	2/16
Catches/stumpings	7/–	1/–
- Source: Cricinfo, 26 May 2019

Nicholas Howard Peters (21 February 1968 – 20 May 2019) was an English cricketer who played first-class cricket for Surrey in 1988 and 1989.

Nick Peters was born in Guildford in Surrey and educated at Sherborne School in Dorset. A right-arm fast-medium bowler, he had one outstanding match, when he took 6 for 31 and 4 for 36 as Surrey beat Warwickshire by an innings and 43 runs in 1988.

After his short cricket career, Peters taught at Framlingham College and Trinity School, then undertook a career as a clinical psychotherapist, which included work at the Priory Hospital in Roehampton and Maudsley Hospital in London, and in private practice in London. He died of cancer.
