= Muhammad Tholchah Hasan =

Indonesian politician (1938–2019)

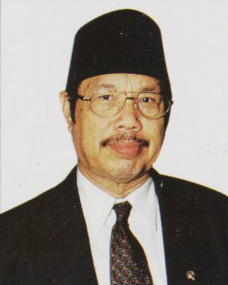
Muhammad Tholchah Hasan

Muhammad Tholchah Hasan (10 October 1938 in Tuban – 29 May 2019 in Malang) was an Indonesian Islamic cleric, academic, and politician who served as Minister of Religious Affairs.
