= Masaki Hoshino =

Japanese Go player (1967–2019)

Personal information
- Native name: 星野正樹 (Japanese)
- Full name: Masaki Hoshino
- Born: January 11, 1967 Chiba City, Japan
- Died: May 14, 2019 (aged 52)

Sport
- Turned pro: 1985
- Teacher: Nobumitsu Oka
- Rank: 9 dan
- Affiliation: Nihon Ki-in, Tokyo branch

Masaki Hoshino (星野正樹, Hoshino Masaki; January 11, 1967 – May 14, 2019) was a professional Go player.

== Biography ==
Masaki Hoshino became a professional in 1985. He reached 8 dan in 1999.

== Promotion record ==
Rank	Year	Notes
1 dan	1985	
2 dan	1985	
3 dan	1987	
4 dan	1989	
5 dan	1990	
6 dan	1993	
7 dan	1996	
8 dan	1999	
9 dan	2015	
