= Richard Hidalgo (climber) =

Peruvian mountain climber (1967–2019)

Personal information
- Born: Richard Hidalgo Jara; 14 February 1967 Lima, Peru
- Died: 8 May 2019 (aged 52) Makalu, Nepal
- Occupation: Mountaineer
- Website: www.richardhidalgo.com

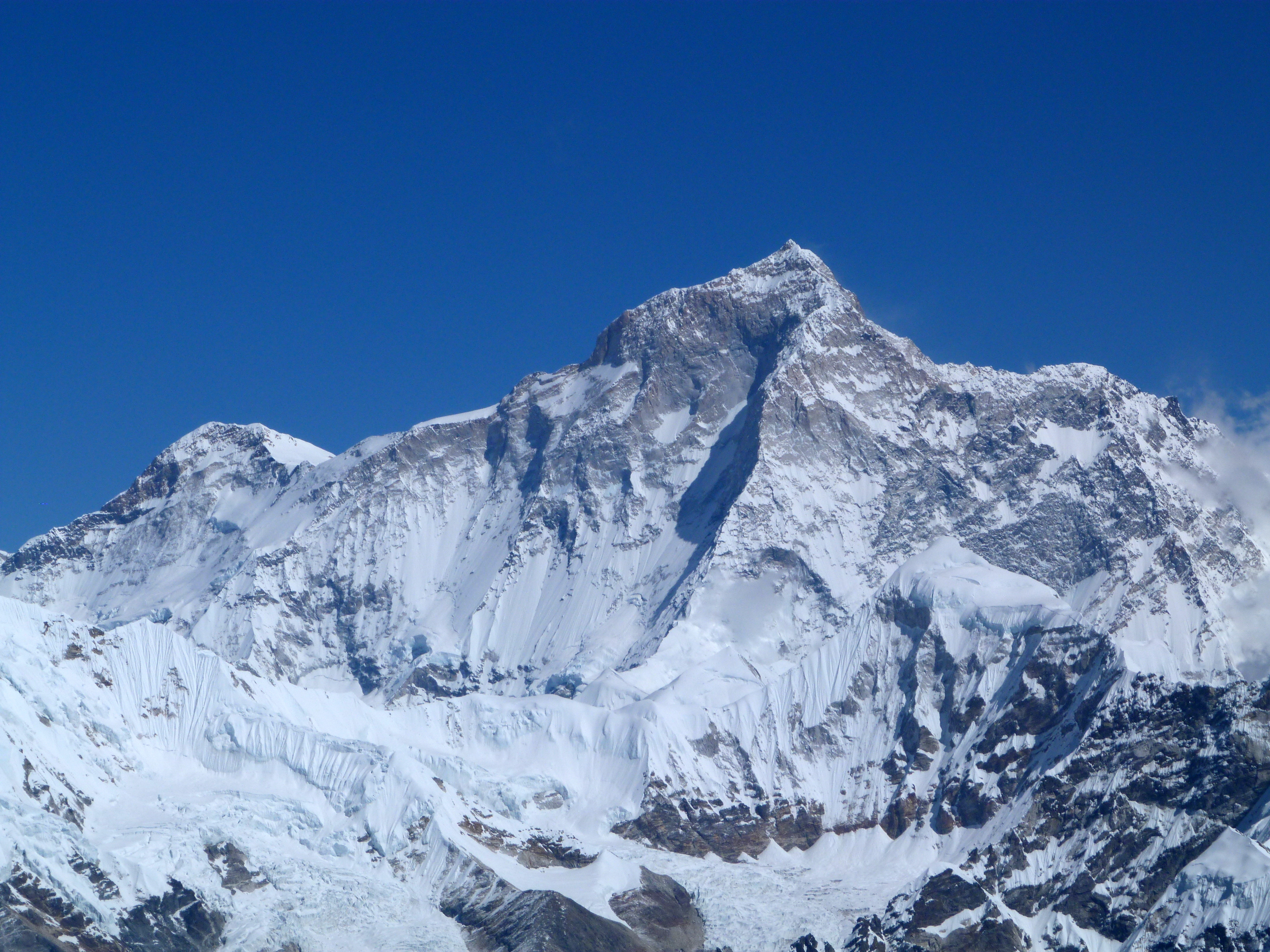
Makalu, the location of Hidalgo's last climb.

Richard Hidalgo (February 14, 1967 — May 8, 2019) was a Peruvian mountaineer and mountain guide member of the Association of Mountain Guides of Peru (AGMP) and the International Union of Mountain Guide Associations (UIAGM).

He was the first climber in Peru to access the summit of six of the fourteen mountains above 8000 m s.n.m. without using supplemental oxygen. He managed to climb the peaks of Kilimanjaro, Chachani, Aconcagua and Cho Oyu.

On the morning of May 8, 2019, he was found dead in his tent located in camp 2 of Makalu Mountain, at 6600 m, by Sherpa members of his expedition.
