= Valentyn Sapronov =

Ukrainian footballer (1932–2019)

Personal information
- Full name: Valentyn Havrylovych Sapronov
- Date of birth: 23 January 1932
- Place of birth: Avdiivka, Ukrainian SSR
- Date of death: 17 May 2019 (aged 87)
- Place of death: Ukraine
- Position: Forward

Senior career*
Years	Team	Apps	(Gls)
1952–1963	FC Shakhtar Stalino	205	(27)

Managerial career
- 1971–1972: FC Lokomotyv Donetsk
- * Club domestic league appearances and goals

Valentyn Sapronov (23 January 1932 – 17 May 2019) was a Ukrainian association footballer from the Soviet Union-era who played for FC Shakhtar Donetsk.

In 1956, Sapronov played a game for Ukraine at the Spartakiad of the Peoples of the USSR.
