= Heinz Unbehauen =

German control engineer (1935–2019)

Heinz Unbehauen (7 October 1935 in Stuttgart – 1 May 2019) was a German control engineer.

He studied mechanical engineering, graduating in 1961, and afterwards receiving a Doctorate in electrical engineering in 1964 at the University of Stuttgart, with thesis Zur Optimierung verfahrenstechnischer Regelkreise ("For the optimization of process control loops"). After finishing habilitation in 1969 in Stuttgart, in 1971 he started working as an assistant professor, and in 1974 as an associate professor. Since 1975 he worked as a professor at the University of Bochum in the Department of Automation and Process Automation. He retired in 2001.

He was the author of a widely used textbook on control engineering.

His brother Rolf Unbehauen is also an engineer.

== Works ==
- Regelungstechnik, Vieweg/Teubner, 3 Bände
  - Band 1: Klassische Verfahren zur Analyse und Synthese linearer kontinuierlicher Regelsysteme, Fuzzy-Regelsysteme, 14. Auflage 2007
  - Band 2: Zustandsregelungen, digitale und nichtlineare Regelsysteme, 9. Auflage 2007
  - Band 3: Identifikation, Adaption, Optimierung, 7. Auflage 2011
- Regelungstechnik: Aufgaben, Vieweg 1992
- with N. M. Filatov: Adaptive dual control: theory and applications, Springer Verlag 2004
- with Ganti Prasada Rao: Identification of continuous systems, North Holland 1987
- with Erich Linck: Dynamische Modelle und Simulation von Dampfüberhitzern, VDI Verlag 1971
- Stabilität und Regelgüte linearer und nichtlinearer Regler in einschleifigen Regelkreisen bei verschiedenen Streckentypen mit P- und I-Verhalten, VDI Verlag 1970

== Links ==
- Homepage
