= Jean-Marie Benjamin =

French priest

The Rev. Jean-Marie Benjamin (born April 1946 in Salon-de-Provence) is a priest who once worked as an assistant to the Vatican secretary of state and became an activist for lifting Iraq sanctions prior to the 2003 Invasion of Iraq. He is reported to have set up the meeting between former Pope John Paul II and Tariq Aziz, Iraq's foreign minister.
