= Telésforo Santiago Enríquez =

Mexican radio journalist and professor (died 2019)

- Born: Mexico
- Died: May 2, 2019; Oaxaca, Mexico
- Cause of death: Ballistic trauma
- Occupation: Journalist
- Known for: Victim of unsolved murder

Telésforo Santiago Enríquez (died May 2, 2019) was a Mexican radio journalist and professor of Indigenous education in Oaxaca who was ambushed and shot dead.

== Career ==
Telésforo Santiago Enriquez worked as a school teacher and as a professor of Indigenous education.

He founded the community Indigenous radio station ″El Cafetal″ in the southern Indigenous region of Mexico, in the Municipality of San Agustín Loxicha, Oaxaca state. He sought to preserve indigenous traditions and the Zapotec language and to protect the rights of indigenous people through the radio. According to a statement by Mexico's National Human Rights Commission after his death, he criticized local government for diverting public funds.

== Murder ==
On May 2, 2019, the eve of World Press Freedom Day, he was fatally shot in the mouth and heart. His dead body was found in a vehicle that afternoon. Authorities reported that he had been driving in the neighborhood of Ampliación Tres Cruces when he was ambushed and killed. He had been threatened in February 2019 and had recently received an anonymous threat on his live call-in talk show when he was criticizing local government.

== Investigation and reactions ==
The authorities of Costa Region started an investigation into the murder. Jesús Ramírez Cuevas, a spokesman for the President of Mexico, said the Mexican government was committed to protect journalism in Mexico and would make every effort to find the murderers.

In response to the shooting, international journalist organisations expressed outrage at the situation in Mexico, where journalists are often killed. Reporters Without Borders issued a statement on 3 May, emphasizing his work for human rights; Emmanuel Colombie, head of the organization's Latin America branch, said: ″This latest murder is a reminder of how dangerous it is to practice journalism in Mexico″.

== See also ==
- List of unsolved murders (2000–present)
