= Otto P. Strausz =

Canadian chemist (1924–2019)

Otto P. Strausz (January 29, 1924 – May 14, 2019) was a Canadian professor of chemistry.

== Life and career ==
He was born in Miskolc (Hungary), drafted for service by the Hungarian army in 1942, and deported to the Mauthausen concentration camp in October 1944. He was liberated in bad health by the American army in April 1945, and returned to Budapest in August 1945 where he finished his BSc degree from the Eötvös Loránd University in 1952. Without finishing his PhD, in 1956 he escaped to Austria and finally he arrived in Halifax (Nova Scotia, Canada) in February 1957 and established himself in Edmonton (Alberta). There he worked for his PhD at the University of Alberta under the supervision of Harry E. Gunning, He obtained the degree in 1962.

After being appointed assistant professor he obtained the rank of full professor in 1973, and eventually retired on August 31, 1989, becoming professor emeritus; he finally settled in Toronto where he died in May 2019.

His research focused initially in gas-phase chemical kinetics and photochemistry working in detection and study of intermediates as thiirenes, carbynes, cyclobutadiene, using new techniques like laser-flash photolysis, etc., publishing over 300 articles in chemistry journals and was editor of several of them, organized important symposia and was a member of many international scientific committees. Later he was involved in the research and development of Alberta's oil and sand resources, culminating with the publishing of the book The Chemistry of Alberta Oil Sands, Bitumens and Heavy Oils (2003).

Strausz was a fellow of the Chemical Institute of Canada (1973) and received their E. W. R. Steacie Award in Photochemistry in 1987. He was also a corresponding member of the European Academy of Arts and Sciences (1983).

== Most-cited publications ==
- Strausz OP, Mojelsky TW, Lown EM. The molecular structure of asphaltene: an unfolding story. Fuel. 1992 Dec 1;71(12):1355-63 (Cited 414 times, according to Google Scholar)
- Calvert JG, Bottenheim JW, Strausz OP. Mechanism of the homogeneous oxidation of sulfur dioxide in the troposphere. InSulfur in the Atmosphere 1978 Jan 1 (pp. 197–226). Pergamon.
- Murgich J, Abanero JA, Strausz OP. Molecular recognition in aggregates formed by asphaltene and resin molecules from the Athabasca oil sand. Energy & Fuels. 1999 Mar 15;13(2):278-86. (Cited 309 times, according to Google Scholar.)
