= Md. Nazim Uddin =

Bangladeshi fighter (died 2019)

Md Nazim Uddin BP
- Born: c. 1935
- Died: 2 May 2019

Md. Nazim Uddin was a Bangladeshi fighter. He was awarded Bir Protik for his contribution to the Liberation War of Bangladesh.

== Biography ==
Nazim Uddin's father's name was Arab Ali and his mother's name Misri Begum. He was in East Pakistan Rifles in 1971. After the declaration of independence of Bangladesh, he decided to take part in the Liberation War of Bangladesh. He was appointed in Sholoshahar, Chittagong at that time.

Nazim Uddin and other fighters joined with other members of East Bengal Regiment in Brahmanbaria in April. They were in Ashuganj Upazila to protect the place from Pakistanis. He also attacked Dharampasha Thana of Sunamganj in guerrilla style along with other freedom fighters in May and got successful results. Later, he crossed the border and went to India. He trained new fighters in India.

In November, Nazim Uddin and other fighters went to Golapganj, Sylhet from India. They destroyed the defence of Pakistanis in Komolpur, Golapganj. After independence, he was awarded Bir Protik from Bangladesh Government for his contribution to the Liberation War of Bangladesh.

Nazim Uddin was married to Shamima Aktar. They had two daughters.

Nazim Uddin died on 2 May 2019 at the age of 84.
