= Deaths in July 2019 =

The following is a list of notable deaths in July 2019.

Entries for each day are listed alphabetically by surname. A typical entry lists information in the following sequence:

- Name, age, country of citizenship at birth, subsequent country of citizenship (if applicable), reason for notability, cause of death (if known), and reference.

== July 2019 ==
=== 1 ===
- Joseph Amlong, 82, American Olympic rower.
- Ezzat Abou Aouf, 70, Egyptian actor, liver and heart failure.
- Joseph Bolangi Egwanga Ediba Tasame, 81, Congolese Roman Catholic prelate, Bishop of Budjala (1974–2009).
- Eric A. Bowie, 82, Scottish-born Canadian tax judge.
- Bob Collymore, 61, Guyanese-born British telecom executive, CEO of Safaricom (since 2010), acute myeloid leukaemia.
- Nikola Dagorov, 94, Bulgarian Olympic triple jumper (1952).
- Renato Dehò, 72, Italian footballer.
- Norman Geisler, 86, American theologian.
- Osvalda Giardi, 86, Italian high jumper and pentathlete.
- Dave Gilbert, 84, Canadian politician, MHA (1985–1996).
- Rolland Golden, 87, American artist.
- Ennio Guarnieri, 88, Italian cinematographer (L'assoluto naturale, The Garden of the Finzi-Continis, Brother Sun, Sister Moon).
- Pierre Lenhardt, 91, French Roman Catholic theologian.
- Arthur McGee, 86, American fashion designer.
- Jackie Mekler, 87, South African long-distance runner, British Empire and Commonwealth silver medalist (1954).
- Derrill Osborn, 76, American fashion executive (Neiman Marcus).
- Al Picard, 96, Canadian ice hockey player (Sudbury Wolves, Buffalo Bisons, Dallas Texans).
- Sándor Popovics, 80, Hungarian football player (Sparta Rotterdam) and manager (N.E.C., De Graafschap).
- Ludy Pudluk, 76, Canadian politician, MLA (1975–1995).
- Khalid bin Sultan Al Qasimi, 39, Emirati royal (Al-Qasimi) and fashion designer.
- Sid Ramin, 100, American composer (West Side Story, Too Many Thieves, Stiletto), Oscar (1961) and Grammy winner (1961).
- Jacques Rougeau Sr., 89, Canadian professional wrestler (NWF).
- Bogusław Schaeffer, 90, Polish composer, musicologist and graphic artist.
- Jerry Seltzer, 87, American roller derby promoter.
- Tyler Skaggs, 27, American baseball player (Arizona Diamondbacks, Los Angeles Angels), drug overdose.
- Ulrike Stanggassinger, 51, German Olympic alpine skier (1988).

=== 2 ===
- Don Ballard, 95, American politician, member of the Georgia House of Representatives (1957–1965, 1967–1970) and Senate (1971–1982).
- Adrian Bey, 81, Rhodesian-born American tennis player.
- Leila Leah Bronner, 89, American Jewish historian and Bible scholar.
- Élie Brousse, 97, French rugby league player (Roanne, Lyon, national team).
- Pat Crawford Brown, 90, American actress (Desperate Housewives, Coach, The Rocketeer).
- Michael Colgrass, 87, American-born Canadian composer, Pulitzer Prize winner (1978), skin cancer.
- Costa Cordalis, 75, Greek-born German schlager singer.
- Suzanne Eaton, 59, American biologist, asphyxiation.
- Hugh Edighoffer, 90, Canadian politician.
- Ion Geantă, 59, Romanian Olympic sprint canoer.
- Diana Henderson, 72, British solicitor, army officer and historian.
- Lee Iacocca, 94, American automobile executive (Ford Motor Company, Chrysler) and writer (Where Have All the Leaders Gone?), complications from Parkinson's disease.
- Duncan Lamont, 88, British jazz saxophonist and composer.
- Li Zuixiong, 78, Chinese conservation scientist, Vice President of the Dunhuang Research Academy.
- Michelle Medina, 32, Ecuadorian singer, athlete and TV presenter, skin cancer.
- José Luis Merino, 92, Spanish film director (The Hanging Woman, Scream of the Demon Lover, Réquiem para el gringo).
- W. Thomas Molloy, 78, Canadian politician, Lieutenant Governor of Saskatchewan (since 2018), pancreatic cancer.
- Rabin Mondal, 90, Indian painter.
- Mr. Two Bits, 96, American cheerleader (University of Florida).
- Francesco Pontone, 92, Italian politician, Senator (1987–2013).
- Jaime Posada Díaz, 94, Colombian writer and politician, Minister of National Education (1958–1962) and Governor of Cundinamarca Department (1987–1990).
- George Barclay Richardson, 94, British economist, Warden of Keble College, Oxford (1989–1994).
- Richmond Shepard, 90, American theater director and mime.
- Charles E. Sova, 91, American politician.
- Lis Verhoeven, 88, German actress and theatre director.
- Bruce Wallrodt, 67, Australian shot putter and javelin thrower, Paralympic champion (1988, 1992, 1996).

=== 3 ===
- Sudarshan Agarwal, 88, Indian politician, Governor of Uttarakhand (2003–2007) and Sikkim (2007–2008).
- Perro Aguayo, 73, Mexican professional wrestler (AAA, UWA, WWF), heart attack.
- Koldo Aguirre, 80, Spanish football player (Athletic Bilbao, national team) and manager (Hércules).
- June Bacon-Bercey, 90, American meteorologist (NOAA, NWS, Atomic Energy Commission), frontotemporal dementia.
- Jacek Baluch, 79, Polish literary scholar.
- Basant Kumar Birla, 98, Indian businessman, Chairman of B.K. Birla Institute of Engineering & Technology (since 2007).
- Christopher Booker, 81, British journalist (The Sunday Telegraph, Private Eye).
- Pol Cruchten, 55, Luxembourgish film director (Somewhere in Europe, Wedding Night – End of the Song, Never Die Young).
- Julia Farron, 96, English ballerina.
- Mitsuo Itoh, 82, Japanese Grand Prix motorcycle road racer.
- Arte Johnson, 90, American comedian and actor (Rowan & Martin's Laugh-In), Emmy Award winner (1969), bladder and prostate cancer.
- Gary Kolb, 79, American baseball player (St. Louis Cardinals, Milwaukee Braves, Pittsburgh Pirates).
- Peter Lahdenpera, 91, American Olympic skier (1960, 1964).
- Malva Landa, 100, Ukrainian-born Russian geologist and human rights activist.
- Li Xintian, 90, Chinese novelist.
- Jared Lorenzen, 38, American football player (Kentucky Wildcats, New York Giants, Indianapolis Colts), infection.
- Arseny Mironov, 101, Russian aeronautical engineer.
- Nisar Nasik, 76, Pakistani poet ("Dil Dil Pakistan").
- Tony Robichaux, 57, American baseball player (McNeese State) and coach (Louisiana Ragin' Cajuns), complications from a heart attack.
- Alan Rogan, 68, British guitar technician (The Who), cancer.
- Thomas Shardelow, 87, South African cyclist, Olympic silver medallist (1952).
- Edward Shotter, 86, British Anglican priest and author, Dean of Rochester (1989–2003).
- Clovis Swinney, 73, American football player (New Orleans Saints, New York Jets).
- Vasco Tagliavini, 81, Italian football player (Internazionale, Udinese) and manager (Triestina).
- Raymond Tarcy, 82, French politician, Senator (1980–1989).
- Stephen Verona, 78, American film director (The Lords of Flatbush, Boardwalk, Pipe Dreams), lung cancer.

=== 4 ===
- Robert A. Bernhard, 91, American banker (Lehman Brothers).
- H. Gopal Bhandary, 66, Indian politician, member of the Karnataka Legislative Assembly (1999–2004, 2008–2013), heart attack.
- Chris Cline, 60, American billionaire mining entrepreneur, helicopter crash.
- Eduardo Fajardo, 94, Spanish actor (The Two Faces of Fear, Nightmare City, Exterminators of the Year 3000).
- Arturo Fernández Rodríguez, 90, Spanish actor (Red Cross Girls, College Boarding House, The Locket), stomach cancer.
- Vincenzo Finocchiaro, 66, Italian Olympic swimmer (1972).
- Héctor Huerta Ríos, Mexican criminal (Beltrán-Leyva Cartel), shot.
- Munshi Mohammad Fazle Kader, 90, Indian citizen, awarded Friends of Liberation War Honour.
- Holger Kirschke, 71, German Olympic swimmer.
- Eva Mozes Kor, 85, Romanian-born American Holocaust survivor and author, founder of CANDLES Holocaust Museum and Education Center.
- Leon Kossoff, 92, British painter.
- Pierre Lhomme, 89, French cinematographer (Cyrano de Bergerac, Lovers Like Us, Deadly Circuit).
- Robert F. Marx, 85, American scuba diver.
- Wayne Mass, 73, American football player (Chicago Bears), heart attack.
- Vernon McArley, 95, New Zealand cricketer (Otago).
- Christopher Minikon, 86, Liberian public servant, statesman, ambassador, professor, historian, and businessman.
- Vivian Perlis, 91, American musicologist.
- André Pinçon, 88, French politician, Mayor of Laval (1973–1994).
- Jean Royer, 81, Canadian poet.

=== 5 ===
- Carter F. Bales, 80-81, American investor and environmentalist.
- Marie Borroff, 95, American poet and translator.
- Dorothy Buckland-Fuller, 97, Australian sociologist.
- Douglas Crimp, 74, American art historian, writer and curator, multiple myeloma.
- Tzemach Cunin, 43, American rabbi.
- Mohan Das, Indian politician, MLA (1996–2001).
- Neil Davey, 98, Australian public servant, oversaw currency decimalisation.
- Gerry Fairhead, 96, Canadian Olympic sailor (1948).
- Joel Filártiga, 86, Paraguayan human rights activist and doctor.
- Andrew Graham-Yooll, 75, Argentine journalist and writer.
- Ugo Gregoretti, 88, Italian television and film director (Ro.Go.Pa.G., Omicron, Beautiful Families).
- Eberhard Havekost, 52, German painter.
- Kevin Higgins, 68, Australian footballer (Geelong, Fitzroy).
- Bobby Hopkins, 62, American football player (Tampa Bay Bandits) and world champion arm-wrestler.
- Hu Maozhou, 91, Chinese politician, Mayor of Chengdu (1981–1988).
- Sir Wynn Hugh-Jones, 95, British diplomat and politician.
- Luther "Houserocker" Johnson, 79, American musician.
- Mokhtar Kechamli, 56, Algerian football player (ASM Oran, MC Oran, national team) and manager, heart attack.
- Lewis Lloyd, 60, American basketball player (Golden State Warriors, Houston Rockets).
- John McCririck, 79, British horse racing journalist, lung cancer.
- Lis Mellemgaard, 95, Danish insurgent spy (Holger Danske) and ophthalmologist.
- José Muñoz Sánchez, 57, Spanish politician, Senator (since 2018).
- Adila Mutallibova, 81, Azerbaijani socialite, First Lady (1991–1992).
- Marie Ponsot, 98, American poet and literary critic.
- Eunice Rosen, 88, American bridge player.
- Klaus Sahlgren, 90, Finnish diplomat.
- Kathleen Sims, 77, American politician, member of the Idaho Senate (2001–2002) and House of Representatives (2010–2016).
- Paolo Vinaccia, 65, Italian jazz percussionist, pancreatic cancer.
- Nelly Wies-Weyrich, 86, Luxembourgish Olympic archer.
- Robert M. Young, 83, American author and academic.
- Zhang Baifa, 84, Chinese politician, Vice Mayor and Executive Vice Mayor of Beijing (1983–1995).

=== 6 ===
- Paco Alonso, 67, Mexican wrestling executive and promoter (CMLL).
- Patrícia Araújo, 37, Brazilian actress and model.
- Cameron Boyce, 20, American actor (Jessie, Grown Ups, Descendants), epileptic seizure.
- Bill Casimaty, 83, Australian farmer.
- Martin Charnin, 84, American lyricist (Annie, Two by Two, Hot Spot) and theatre director (Shadowlands), heart attack.
- Seydi Dinçtürk, 97, Turkish Olympic sprinter (1948).
- João Gilberto, 88, Brazilian singer-songwriter and guitarist, pioneer of bossa nova music style.
- Elka Gilmore, 59, American chef, cardiac arrest.
- Peter Hamilton, 62, Australian footballer (Melbourne).
- Charles Hardnett, 80, American basketball player and coach.
- Ragnar Hoen, 78, Norwegian chess master.
- Parviz Jalayer, 79, Iranian weightlifter, Olympic silver medalist (1968) and Asian Games champion (1966).
- Eddie Jones, 84, American actor (Lois & Clark: The New Adventures of Superman, A League of Their Own, The Rocketeer).
- Arman Kirakossian, 62, Armenian diplomat, Minister of Foreign Affairs (1992–1993), ambassador to the United States (1999–2005) and United Kingdom (since 2018).
- Mandla Maseko, 30, South African candidate astronaut, motorcycle crash.
- Denis Pain, 83, New Zealand jurist, District Court judge (1970–1990), and Olympic eventing chef d'équipe (1988, 1992).
- Calvin Quate, 95, American electrical engineer.
- David Sansing, 86, American historian and author.
- K. L. Shivalinge Gowda, 93, Indian politician, MLA (1962–1967, 1978–1983).
- Lucio Soravito de Franceschi, 79, Italian Roman Catholic prelate, Bishop of Adria-Rovigo (2004–2015).
- Yannis Spathas, 68, Greek guitarist (Socrates Drank the Conium).
- Gus Stager, 96, American swimming coach.
- John Waddington, 81, Australian footballer (North Melbourne).

=== 7 ===
- Edna Anderson, 96, Canadian politician, MP (1988–1993).
- Salvatore Angerami, 62, Italian Roman Catholic prelate, Auxiliary Bishop of Naples (since 2014).
- Artur Brauner, 100, Polish-born German film producer (The Plot to Assassinate Hitler, Angry Harvest, Europa Europa).
- George M. Browning Jr., 90, American lieutenant general.
- Jean Buckley, 87, American baseball player (Kenosha Comets, Rockford Peaches).
- Steve Cannon, 84, American novelist, playwright, and arts impresario (A Gathering of the Tribes), sepsis.
- Bob Fouts, 97, American broadcaster (San Francisco 49ers) and sports reporter (KPIX, KGO).
- Patricia Gallerneau, 64, French politician, Deputy (2017–2019), cancer.
- Rolf Gehlhaar, 75, American composer.
- Jonathan Hodge, 78, British composer (Henry's Cat, Fiddley Foodle Bird, Babe), multiple organ failure.
- Jeff Ingber, 83, English table tennis player.
- Sergio Jacobini, Italian tennis player.
- Greg Johnson, 48, Canadian ice hockey player (Detroit Red Wings, Nashville Predators, Pittsburgh Penguins), Olympic silver medalist (1994), suicide by gunshot.
- Wolfgang Joklik, 92, Austrian-born American virologist.
- Joe Kadenge, 84, Kenyan football player (Abaluhya) and manager (national team), complications from a stroke.
- Elizabeth Killick, 94, British naval electronics engineer, heart attack.
- Ekaterina Koroleva, 20, Russian handballer, drowned.
- Stefan Kwoczała, 85, Polish speedway rider, national individual champion (1959).
- Liu Wenxi, 85, Chinese painter, Vice Chairman of the China Artists Association.
- Amelia Mustone, 90, American politician.
- Ora Namir, 88, Israeli politician and diplomat, member of the Knesset (1973–1996), Minister of Labor (1992–1996), ambassador to China and Mongolia (1996–2000).
- Alex Navab, 53, American financier.
- Sutopo Purwo Nugroho, 49, Indonesian civil servant and academic, Head of Indonesian National Board for Disaster Management Public Relations (since 2010), lung cancer.
- Ramón Héctor Ponce, 71, Argentine footballer (Boca Juniors, Quilmes, Colo-Colo).
- R. Ramakrishnan, 73, Indian businessman and politician, MP (since 1980).
- Vlassis Rassias, 60, Greek writer, publisher and pagan revivalist.
- Mohammad Shahroudi, 93, Iraqi Marja'.
- Harry Simon, 95, German sinologist.
- James D. Wallace, 82, American philosopher.
- Barbara Zatler, 38, Danish model and actress (Klown).

=== 8 ===
- Godfrey Boyle, 74, British author and academic.
- Nick Garratt, 71, Australian rowing coach.
- Dick Lyon, 79, American Olympic rower, heart attack.
- Jan Mokkenstorm, 57, Dutch psychiatrist.
- Neil Oliver, 85, Australian politician, member of the Western Australian Legislative Council (1977–1989).
- Rosie Ruiz, 66, American runner, 1980 Boston Marathon cheat, cancer.
- Arthur Ryan, 83, Irish clothier, founder and chairman of Primark.
- Paul Schramka, 91, American baseball player (Chicago Cubs).
- Michael Seidenberg, 64, American bookseller and writer, heart failure.
- John Sykes, 70, American football player (San Diego Chargers), stroke.
- Zhai Xiangjun, 80, Chinese translator and educator.

=== 9 ===
- Husaini Abdullahi, 80, Nigerian vice admiral, Military Governor of Bendel State (1976–1978).
- John Bailey, 74, Irish politician, member of the Dún Laoghaire–Rathdown County Council (since 2004), complications from motor neuron disease.
- Rushema Begum, 85, Bangladeshi teacher and politician.
- Claude Blanchard, 74, French Olympic ice hockey player (1968).
- Domenico Bova, 72, Italian politician, Deputy (1994–2006).
- Jean Brenchley, 75, American microbiologist.
- Miriam Butterworth, 101, American politician and educator.
- William E. Dannemeyer, 89, American politician, member of the U.S. House of Representatives (1979–1993) and the California State Assembly (1963–1967, 1976–1978).
- Phil Freelon, 66, American architect (National Museum of African American History and Culture, National Center for Civil and Human Rights, Museum of the African Diaspora), complications from amyotrophic lateral sclerosis.
- Neil Greatrex, 68, British trade unionist and convicted fraudster, President of the Union of Democratic Mineworkers (1993–2009), complications from brain haemorrhage.
- Christian Guilleminault, 80, French medical researcher.
- Freddie Jones, 91, English actor (Emmerdale, The Ghosts of Motley Hall, Dune).
- Johnny Kitagawa, 87, Japanese-American talent manager, founder and president of Johnny & Associates, stroke.
- Glenn Mickens, 88, American baseball player (Brooklyn Dodgers), pneumonia.
- Heather Nicholson, 88, New Zealand geologist and author.
- Ross Perot, 89, American billionaire businessman, philanthropist and presidential candidate, founder of Electronic Data Systems and the Reform Party, leukemia.
- Aaron Rosand, 92, American violinist.
- Fernando de la Rúa, 81, Argentine lawyer and academic, President (1999–2001), heart and kidney failure.
- Marian Spencer, 99, American politician, Vice Mayor of Cincinnati, Ohio (1983–1988).
- Zaheen Tahira, 79, Pakistani actress (Khuda Ki Basti, Murad, Umm-e-Kulsoom), complications from a heart attack.
- Rip Torn, 88, American actor (Cross Creek, The Larry Sanders Show, Men in Black), Emmy winner (1996), complications from Alzheimer's disease.
- Ing Wong-Ward, 46, Canadian disability rights activist and journalist, colon cancer.

=== 10 ===
- Paulo Henrique Amorim, 77, Brazilian journalist.
- Bernard Bartzen, 91, American tennis player.
- Reinhard Bortfeld, 92, German geophysicist.
- Jim Bouton, 80, American baseball player (New York Yankees), writer (Ball Four), and actor (The Long Goodbye), cerebral amyloid angiopathy.
- April Byron, 72, Australian singer.
- Valentina Cortese, 96, Italian actress (Malaya, Brother Sun, Sister Moon, Day for Night).
- Lutz Fleischer, 63, German painter and graphic artist.
- Karen R. Hitchcock, 76, American biologist and university administrator.
- Bill Huffman, 94, American politician.
- Amirali Karmali, 89, Ugandan businessman, CEO of Mukwano Group.
- Lucette Lagnado, 62, Egyptian-born American journalist (The Wall Street Journal), complications from cancer.
- Jerry Lawson, 75, American a cappella singer (The Persuasions), Guillain–Barré syndrome.
- Motto McLean, 93, Scottish-born Canadian ice hockey player (Omaha Knights).
- Walt Michaels, 89, American football player (Cleveland Browns) and coach (New York Jets).
- Denise Nickerson, 62, American actress (Willy Wonka & the Chocolate Factory, Dark Shadows, Smile), seizure.
- Amit Purohit, 32, Indian actor.
- Nino Randazzo, 86, Italian-Australian politician, Senator (2006–2013).
- Jim Shanley, 82, American football player (Green Bay Packers).
- Albert Shepherd, 82, British actor (The Anniversary, Charlie Bubbles, Before Winter Comes).
- James Small, 50, South African rugby player (Springboks), heart attack.
- Danny Gordon Taylor, 69, American visual effects artist (Real Steel, Terminator 3: Rise of the Machines, Alita: Battle Angel), heart attack.
- Dorothy Toy, 102, American tap dancer (Toy & Wing).
- Gerald Weissmann, 88, Austrian-born American physician, editor-in-chief of The FASEB Journal (2006–2016).
- Noel Whelan, 50, Irish politician and writer.

=== 11 ===
- Benjamin S. Blanchard, 89, American systems engineer.
- Jack Bond, 87, English cricketer (Lancashire).
- Robert Francis Christian, 70, American Roman Catholic prelate, Auxiliary Bishop of San Francisco (since 2018).
- Mike Christie, 69, American ice hockey player (California Golden Seals, Vancouver Canucks), kidney disease.
- Robert Entwistle, 77, English cricketer (Minor Counties, Cumberland, Lancashire).
- Neil Estern, 93, American sculptor.
- Héctor Figueroa, 57, American labor leader, president of SEIU 32BJ, heart attack.
- Dengir Mir Mehmet Fırat, 76, Turkish politician, MP (1999–2011, since 2015), lung cancer.
- John Gardner, 54, Scottish legal philosopher, oesophageal cancer.
- Brendan Grace, 68, Irish comedian and actor (Moondance, Father Ted), lung cancer.
- Rose Greene, 72, American activist and financial planner, bone cancer.
- Séamus Hetherton, 89, Irish Gaelic footballer (Cavan).
- Soumendranath Kundu, 77, Indian cricketer (Bengal, Railways).
- Vincent Lambert, 42, French quadriplegic and vegetative state right-to-die figure, court assisted starvation.
- Théodore Mel Eg, 67, Ivorian politician, Minister of Culture and Francophonie (2005–2007) and of City and Salubrity (2007–2010).
- Sufi Muhammad, 86, Pakistani cleric and Islamist militant, founder and leader of Tehreek-e-Nafaz-e-Shariat-e-Mohammadi (1992–2002).
- Arto Nilsson, 71, Finnish boxer, Olympic bronze medallist (1968).
- Pepita Pardell, 91, Spanish cinema animator pioneer, cartoonist and illustrator (Garbancito de la Mancha, Alegres vacaciones).
- Gord Simpson, 91, Canadian ice hockey player (Winnipeg Maroons).
- Siegfried Strohbach, 89, German composer and conductor.
- Rumen Surdzhiyski, 75, Bulgarian film director (Swan, Place Under the Sun).
- Mark E. Talisman, 78, American legislative aide (Charles Vanik) and Jewish activist.
- William H. Walls, 86, American senior judge of the District Court for the District of New Jersey (1994–2005).

=== 12 ===
- Jorge Aguado, 93, Argentine politician and ruralist, de facto Governor of Buenos Aires Province (1982–1983) and Minister of Agriculture and Livestock (1981).
- Georgios Anastassopoulos, 83, Greek journalist (Journalists' Union of the Athens Daily Newspapers) and politician, MEP (1984–1999) and Vice President (1989–1999).
- Fernando J. Corbató, 93, American computer scientist, developer of Multics, complications from diabetes.
- Franz Eisl, 98, Austrian Olympic sailor (1960, 1972).
- David L. Ferguson, 69, American academic.
- Joe Grzenda, 82, American baseball player (Detroit Tigers, Kansas City Athletics, New York Mets).
- Abdul Hamid, 92, Pakistani field hockey player, Olympic champion (1960) and silver medallist (1956), lung injury.
- Emily Hartridge, 35, British television presenter and internet personality, traffic collision.
- Arisu Jun, 66, Japanese actress and singer, cancer.
- Eberhard Kummer, 78, Austrian singer.
- Arno Marsh, 91, American jazz saxophonist.
- Clyde Middleton, 91, American politician.
- Hodan Nalayeh, 42, Somali-Canadian media executive and activist, shot.
- Claudio Naranjo, 86, Chilean psychiatrist, co-developer of the Enneagram of Personality.
- Gordon Proverbs, 95, New Zealand cricketer.
- M. J. Radhakrishnan, 61, Indian cinematographer (Deshadanam, Karunam, Naalu Pennungal), heart attack.
- Sadie Roberts-Joseph, 75, American civil rights advocate and museum founder (Odell S. Williams Now And Then African-American Museum), asphyxiation.
- Joseph Rouleau, 90, Canadian bass opera singer.
- Diane Ellingson Smith, 60, American gymnast and teacher.
- Russell Smith, 70, American singer-songwriter (Amazing Rhythm Aces), cancer.
- John Herd Thompson, 72, Canadian historian.
- Richard M. Thorne, 76, American physicist.
- Matthew Trundle, 53, British-born New Zealand classics and ancient history academic (University of Auckland), leukemia.
- Stéphanie Windisch-Graetz, 79, Austrian photographer.
- Jean-Pierre Worms, 84, French sociologist and politician, Deputy (1981–1993).

=== 13 ===
- Abu Bakar, 66, Indonesian politician, regent of West Bandung (2008–2018).
- Bob Bastian, 80, American politician, member of the Pennsylvania House of Representatives (1999–2008), crushed by tractor.
- Richard Carter, 65, Australian actor (Mad Max: Fury Road, The Great Gatsby, Rafferty's Rules).
- Cyril Edwards, 71, British medievalist and translator, heart attack.
- Augusto Fantozzi, 79, Italian lawyer and politician, Minister of Economy and Finance (1995–1996).
- June Felter, 99, American painter.
- Joginder Singh Gharaya, 92, Indian army lieutenant general.
- Sadashiv Vasantrao Gorakshkar, 86, Indian writer and art curator.
- Terry Hodgkinson, 70, British land developer, Chairman of Yorkshire Forward (2003–2010).
- Harlan Lane, 82, American psychologist.
- Bill Luxton, 92, Canadian actor and announcer (Tukiki and His Search for a Merry Christmas).
- Ike Maphotho, 88, South African revolutionary and politician, MPL (1994–2014).
- Paul F. Markham, 89, American attorney, U.S. Attorney for the District of Massachusetts (1966–1969), key figure in the Chappaquiddick incident.
- Marcel Paterni, 82, French Olympic weightlifter.
- Kerry Reed-Gilbert, 62, Australian author and Aboriginal rights activist.
- Rod Richards, 72, Welsh politician, MP for Clwyd North West (1992–1997), Leader of the Welsh Conservative Party (1999), cancer.
- Paolo Sardi, 84, Italian Roman Catholic cardinal, Patron of the Sovereign Military Order of Malta (2009–2014).
- Aleksandr Shumidub, 55, Belarusian Olympic ice hockey player (1998) and manager.
- Victor Sosnora, 83, Russian poet and playwright.
- Wang Jiafu, 88, Chinese legal scholar, Director of the Institute of Law, Chinese Academy of Social Sciences.
- Ida Wyman, 93, American photographer.

=== 14 ===
- Carl Bertil Agnestig, 95, Swedish music teacher and composer.
- Frieder Burda, 83, German art collector.
- Rahul Desikan, 41, Indian-born American neuroscientist, complications from amyotrophic lateral sclerosis.
- Bianca Devins, 17, American social media personality, stabbed.
- Claire Dwyer, 55, British geographer, cancer.
- Robert Elgie, 54, Irish academic.
- Hussain Muhammad Ershad, 89, Bangladeshi military officer and politician, Chief of Army Staff (1978–1986) and President (1983–1990), Leader of the Opposition (since 2019), MDS.
- Hoàng Tụy, 91, Vietnamese mathematician.
- Charlee Jacob, 67, American author.
- Merv Johnson, 96, Canadian politician.
- Nereo Laroni, 76, Italian politician, Mayor of Venice (1985–1987) and MEP (1989–1994), complications from heart surgery.
- Margaret Mascarenhas, American author.
- Mike Maser, 72, American football coach (Miami Dolphins, Carolina Panthers, Jacksonville Jaguars).
- Ernie Mims, 86, American television host (WOC).
- Lavenia Padarath, 74, Fijian politician, MP (1999–2001, 2006) and President of the Labour Party (since 2015).
- David Shanno, 81, American mathematician.
- Karl Shiels, 47, Irish actor (Fair City, Into the Badlands, Henry IV, Part 1).
- Ray Skelly, 78, Canadian politician.
- James Taylor, 89, Scottish cricketer.
- Edmund R. Thompson, 89, American major general.
- Bella Tovey, 92, Polish Holocaust survivor.
- Sterling Tucker, 95, American politician and civil rights activist, Chairman of the Council of the District of Columbia (1975–1979), heart and kidney failure.
- Arvind Varma, 71, Indian-born American chemical engineer.
- Pernell Whitaker, 55, American boxer, four-weight world champion, Olympic champion (1984), traffic collision.
- Yu Dunkang, 89, Chinese philosopher and historian of philosophy.
- Paul Albert Zipfel, 83, American Roman Catholic prelate, Bishop of Bismarck (1996–2011).

=== 15 ===
- Frank Ackerman, 72, American economist.
- Alan Alder, 82, Australian ballet dancer.
- Maurice Atherton, 92, British brigadier.
- Marc Batchelor, 49, South African footballer (Kaizer Chiefs, Orlando Pirates), shot.
- Brian Coote, 89, New Zealand legal academic (University of Auckland).
- Mortimer Caplin, 103, American lawyer and educator, IRS Commissioner (1961–1964).
- Ousmane Tanor Dieng, 72, Senegalese politician, Vice-president of the Socialist International (since 1996).
- Craig Fallon, 36, British judoka, world champion (2005), suicide.
- Feng Yuanwei, 88, Chinese politician (6th CPPCC Committee Chairman of Sichuan).
- Harald Fereberger, 90, Austrian Olympic sailor (1952, 1960, 1972).
- Doug Flett, 83, Australian songwriter.
- Alexis Galanos, 78, Cypriot politician, president of the House of Representatives (1991–1996) and Mayor-in-exile of Famagusta (since 2006).
- Dick Hyde, 83, American trombonist.
- Edith Irby Jones, 91, American physician.
- Raymond Choo Kong, 70, Trinidad and Tobago actor, stabbed.
- Bruce Laingen, 96, American diplomat, Ambassador to Malta (1977–1979), captive during the Iran hostage crisis, complications from Parkinson's disease.
- Sir Fergus Millar, 84, British ancient historian, Camden Professor of Ancient History (1984–2002).
- Werner Müller, 73, German businessman and politician, Federal Minister for Economics and Technology (1998–2002).
- Johanna Narten, 88, German linguist (Narten present).
- Sir Rex Richards, 96, British chemist and academic.
- Joe Rayment, 84, English footballer.
- Byambasuren Sharav, 66, Mongolian composer and pianist.
- Thorsteinn I. Sigfusson, 65, Icelandic physicist.
- Hugh Southern, 87, British-born American performing arts manager, pneumonia and heart failure.
- Hugo Tolentino Dipp, 88, Dominican politician, President of the Chamber of Deputies (1982–1987).
- Margaret Todd, 101, Canadian golfer and BC Sports Hall of Fame inductee (1973).
- Olga Vyalikova, 65, Russian actress (An Ordinary Miracle).

=== 16 ===
- Judit Bar-Ilan, 60, Israeli computer scientist.
- Adam Bob, 51, American football player (New York Jets), liver disease.
- Rosa María Britton, 82, Panamanian doctor and novelist.
- Ernie Broglio, 83, American baseball player (St. Louis Cardinals, Chicago Cubs), cancer.
- Daniel Callahan, 88, American philosopher.
- Don Chelf, 87, American football player (Buffalo Bills), stroke.
- Chung Doo-un, 62, South Korean politician, Vice-Mayor of Seoul (2000–2003), MP (2004–2016), suicide.
- Johnny Clegg, 66, British-born South African singer and musician (Juluka, Savuka), pancreatic cancer.
- Barry Coe, 84, American actor (Jaws 2, Peyton Place, Bonanza), myelodysplastic syndrome.
- Raja Dhale, 78, Indian writer and anti-caste discrimination activist, co-founder of Dalit Panthers.
- Matt Doherty Jr., 79, Northern Irish footballer (Derry City, Glentoran).
- Howard Engel, 88, Canadian author, pneumonia.
- Michael English, 88, British politician, MP for Nottingham West (1964–1983).
- Jonathan Gathorne-Hardy, 86, British author.
- Sonia Infante, 75, Mexican actress (El precio de la fama, Un rostro en mi pasado, Young People), cardiac arrest.
- Terry Isaac, 60, American painter, heart attack.
- Pat Kelly, 74, Jamaican rocksteady and reggae singer, complications of kidney disease.
- James Moeller, 85, American jurist, Justice of the Arizona Supreme Court (1987–1998).
- Polly Murray, 85, American medical researcher and health activist.
- Claude-Hélène Perrot, 90, French Africanist and academic.
- Himayat Ali Shair, 93, Pakistani poet and writer.
- John Paul Stevens, 99, American judge, Associate Justice of the Supreme Court (1975–2010), complications from a stroke.
- Su Shuyang, 81, Chinese playwright, novelist, and screenwriter.
- John Tanton, 85, American anti-immigration activist.
- Bill Vitt, 76, American drummer.
- Don Wishart, 85, Canadian ice hockey player.

=== 17 ===
- Andrea Camilleri, 93, Italian writer (Salvo Montalbano) and television writer (Le inchieste del commissario Maigret), complications from a heart attack.
- Ismail Changezi, 65, Pakistani actor.
- Warren Cole, 78, New Zealand rower, Olympic champion (1968).
- Swarup Dutta, 78, Indian actor (Apanjan, Uphaar, Andha Atit).
- Pumpsie Green, 85, American baseball player (Boston Red Sox, New York Mets).
- Nikola Hajdin, 96, Serbian civil engineer, president of the Serbian Academy of Sciences and Arts (2003–2015).
- Houston Markham, 75, American football coach.
- S. R. Mehrotra, 88, Indian historian.
- Giuseppe Merlo, 91, Italian tennis player.
- Ian Murphy, 40, American journalist and satirist (The Beast).
- Duane Mutch, 94, American politician, member of the North Dakota Senate (1959–1976; 1979–2006).
- Wesley Pruden, 83, American journalist and editor (The Washington Times).
- Dragomir Racić, 72, Serbian footballer (Red Star Belgrade, Castellón).
- Donald W. Thompson, 81, American film director, producer and writer (A Thief in the Night).
- Boris Vorobyov, 69, Soviet Olympic rower (1972).
- Robert Waseige, 79, Belgian footballer and coach (Standard Liège, national team).

=== 18 ===
- Yukiya Amano, 72, Japanese diplomat, Director General of the International Atomic Energy Agency (since 2009).
- Bobbie Lea Bennett, 72, American disability and transgender rights activist.
- André Bradford, 48, Portuguese politician and journalist, Azores MLA (since 2004), MEP (since 2019), cardiac arrest.
- Charles Ceccaldi-Raynaud, 94, French lawyer and politician, Senator (1995–2004), Deputy (1993–1995), Mayor of Puteaux (1969–2004).
- Luciano De Crescenzo, 90, Italian writer, actor and film director (Così parlò Bellavista), lung disease.
- Joseph A. Falcon, 96, American mechanical engineer and business executive.
- Yves Forest, 98, Canadian politician, MP (1963–1972).
- Bob Frank, 75, American singer-songwriter.
- Rosemary Ellen Guiley, 69, American paranormal investigator.
- David Hedison, 92, American actor (The Fly, Live and Let Die, Voyage to the Bottom of the Sea).
- Kurt Julius Isselbacher, 93, German-born American gastroenterologist, author and researcher, stroke.
- Ben Kinchlow, 82, American author, minister and televangelist, co-host of The 700 Club.
- Hugh McInnis, 80, American football player (St. Louis Cardinals, Detroit Lions).
- Robert Milli, 86, American actor (Guiding Light, Klute, Playing for Keeps).
- Macy Morse, 98, American peace and anti-nuclear activist.
- Roelof Nelissen, 88, Dutch politician and banker, Deputy Prime Minister (1971–1973), Minister of Finance (1971–1973), CEO of the AMRO Bank (1983–1991).
- Mitch Petrus, 32, American football player (New York Giants), heatstroke.
- P. Rajagopal, 72, Indian restaurateur and convicted murderer, founder of Saravana Bhavan, complications from a heart attack.
- Detlef Thorith, 76, German Olympic discus thrower.
- Darlene Tompkins, 78, American actress (Blue Hawaii), stroke.
- James Townsend, 91, American politician.
- Zhao Meng, 62, Chinese sculptor.
- Japanese victims of the Kyoto Animation arson attack:
  - Naomi Ishida, 49, colorist (Hyouka, Amagi Brilliant Park, A Silent Voice).
  - Yoshiji Kigami, 61, animation director (Munto, Tamako Market, Nichijou).
  - Futoshi Nishiya, 37, animator and character designer (Clannad, Free!, Inuyasha, Kanon).
  - Yasuhiro Takemoto, 47, animation director (Hyouka, Amagi Brilliant Park, Miss Kobayashi's Dragon Maid).

=== 19 ===
- Arswendo Atmowiloto, 70, Indonesian journalist and writer, prostate cancer.
- Inger Berggren, 85, Swedish schlager singer ("Sol och vår").
- Ivy Bethune, 101, Russian-born American actress (Back to the Future, General Hospital, Father Murphy).
- John Elya, 90, Lebanese-born American Melkite Greek Catholic hierarch, Bishop of Newton (1993–2004).
- Shirley Hardman, 90, New Zealand sprint athlete, British Empire Games silver medalist (1950).
- Emanuel Hatzofe, 90, Israeli sculptor.
- Rutger Hauer, 75, Dutch actor (Blade Runner, Nighthawks, The Hitcher), pancreatic cancer.
- Paul Held, 91, American football player (Pittsburgh Steelers, Green Bay Packers).
- Ágnes Heller, 90, Hungarian philosopher and political theorist (The New School), drowned.
- David Hunt, 84, Australian judge, member of the Supreme Court of New South Wales (1991–1998).
- Jeremy Kemp, 84, British actor (Top Secret!, Z-Cars, The Blue Max).
- William Morton, 58, Scottish cricketer (Warwickshire Bears, national team).
- Don Mossi, 90, American baseball player (Cleveland Indians, Detroit Tigers).
- César Pelli, 92, Argentine architect (Petronas Towers, Carnegie Hall Tower).
- Vincent J. Piro, 78, American politician.
- Bert Rechichar, 89, American football player (Baltimore Colts).
- Dixon Seeto, Fijian hotelier and politician, Senator (2006), complications from a traffic collision.
- Jerome B. Simandle, 70, American senior judge (U.S. District Court for the District of New Jersey), liver cancer.
- Marcel Alain de Souza, 65, Beninese politician and banker, Minister for Development, Economic Analysis and Forecast (2011–2015), President of the ECOWAS Commission (2016–2018).
- Godfried Toussaint, 75, Canadian computer scientist.
- Marylou Whitney, 93, American socialite, philanthropist and Thoroughbred racehorse breeder.
- Patrick Winston, 76, American computer scientist, Director of the MIT Artificial Intelligence Laboratory (1972–1997).
- Yao Lee, 96, Chinese singer ("Rose, Rose, I Love You").

=== 20 ===
- Leif Jørgen Aune, 94, Norwegian politician, Minister of Local Government (1973–1978).
- Paul Barker, 83, British journalist.
- Paddy Bassett, 101, New Zealand agricultural scientist, first female graduate of Massey University.
- Dick Blanchfield, 79, Irish hurler.
- Thomas P. Carney, 78, American lieutenant general.
- Antonino Cuffaro, 87, Italian politician, MP (1976–1987, 1994–1996).
- Sheila Dikshit, 81, Indian politician, MP (1984–1989), Chief Minister of Delhi (1998–2013) and Governor of Kerala (2014), cardiac arrest.
- Roberto Fernández Retamar, 89, Cuban poet and essayist.
- Dick de Groot, 98, Dutch-American painter.
- R. James Harvey, 97, American politician and judge, member of the U.S. House of Representatives (1961–1974) and the U.S. District Court for the Eastern District of Michigan (1973–1984).
- iNcontroL, 33, American professional StarCraft player, pulmonary embolism.
- Peter McNamara, 64, Australian tennis player and coach, prostate cancer.
- Marisa Merz, 93, Italian artist (Arte povera).
- Ilaria Occhini, 85, Italian actress (Doctor and the Healer, Loose Cannons).
- Jack O'Connell, 96, American film director and producer (Greenwich Village Story, Revolution, Swedish Fly Girls).
- Lance Pearson, 82, New Zealand cricketer.
- Liane Russell, 95, Austrian-born American geneticist and conservationist.

=== 21 ===
- Eddie Bohan, 86, Irish politician, Senator (1987–2007).
- Brian Carter, 80, English footballer (Bath City, Bristol Rovers).
- Hugo Cóccaro, 65, Argentine politician, Governor of Tierra del Fuego (2005–2007).
- José Manuel Estepa Llaurens, 93, Spanish Roman Catholic cardinal, Military Ordinary of Spain (1986–2003).
- Mange Ram Garg, 83, Indian politician, member of the Delhi Legislative Assembly.
- Trish Godman, 79, Scottish politician, MSP (1999–2011).
- Francisco Grau, 72, Spanish military officer and composer, Director of the Musical Unit of the Royal Guard (1988–2008).
- Yelena Grigoryeva, 41, Russian LGBT activist, stabbed and strangled.
- Nick Harrison, 37, American racing crew chief (Phoenix Racing), mixed drug intoxication.
- Laurie Hergenhan, 88, Australian literary scholar.
- Ben Johnston, 93, American microtonal composer.
- Mark Kleiman, 68, American criminologist, complications from a kidney transplant.
- Wayne Knox, 92, American politician.
- Paul Krassner, 87, American writer and political activist (The Realist).
- Yaakov Malkin, 92, Israeli writer and literary critic.
- Juan Carlos Márquez, 48, Spanish-Venezuelan businessman, asphyxiation.
- Robert Morgenthau, 99, American lawyer, New York County District Attorney (1975–2009) and U.S. Attorney for the Southern District of New York (1961–1962; 1962–1970).
- Ann Moyal, 93, Australian historian.
- Éric Névé, 57, French film producer (Dobermann, Sheitan, Suburra).
- Pete Nielsen, 81, American politician.
- Ram Chandra Paswan, 57, Indian politician, MP (since 2014), heart attack.
- Claro Pellosis, 84, Filipino Olympic sprinter (1960), cardiac arrest.
- Peter Ramsay, 79, New Zealand educationalist (University of Waikato) and daffodil breeder.
- A. K. Roy, 90, Indian politician, MP (1977–1984, 1989–1991).
- Wong Po-yan, 96, Hong Kong industrialist and politician, member of the Legislative Council (1979–1988) and chairman of the Airport Authority (1995–1999).
- Adel Zaky, 71, Egyptian Roman Catholic prelate, Vicar Apostolic of Alexandria (since 2009).
- Michael Zearott, 81, American conductor and composer.

=== 22 ===
- Dan Clemens, 74, American politician, member of the Missouri Senate (2002–2010).
- Daniel Rae Costello, 58, Fijian-born Samoan guitarist, cancer.
- Petra Fuhrmann, 63, German politician, member of Landtag of Hesse (1994-2014).
- Peter Hamm, 82, German poet and writer.
- Christopher C. Kraft Jr., 95, American aerospace engineer, Director of Johnson Space Center (1972–1982).
- Brigitte Kronauer, 78, German writer.
- Hans Lagerqvist, 79, Swedish Olympic pole vaulter (1972), brain cancer.
- Juan Rodolfo Laise, 93, Argentine Roman Catholic prelate, Bishop of San Luis (1971–2001).
- Li Peng, 90, Chinese politician, Premier (1987–1998), Vice Premier (1983–1987), and Chairman of the Standing Committee of the National People's Congress (1998–2003).
- Richard Macksey, 87, American academic.
- Leon Marr, 71, Canadian film director (Dancing in the Dark).
- Nikos Milas, 91, Greek Olympic basketball player (1952).
- Giuliana Morandini, 81, Italian writer and literary critic.
- Viktor Musiyaka, 73, Ukrainian politician, Deputy (1994–1998, 2002–2006), leader of the Forward, Ukraine! party.
- Art Neville, 81, American singer-songwriter and keyboardist (The Meters, The Neville Brothers).
- Michael Nauenberg, 84, German-born American theoretical physicist.
- Sea of Class, 4, Irish racehorse, euthanised for abdominal cancer.
- Bill Schulz, 80, American journalist (Reader's Digest).
- Wayne See, 95, American basketball player (Waterloo Hawks).
- Bassam Shakaa, 89, Palestinian politician, mayor of Nablus (1976–1982).
- Hilary Squires, 86, South African judge and barrister.
- Gunilla Tjernberg, 68, Swedish politician.

=== 23 ===
- Khwaja Muhammad Aslam, 97, Pakistani Olympic athlete (1952).
- Rella Braithwaite, 96, Canadian author.
- Cao Shuangming, 89, Chinese general, Commander of the PLA Air Force (1992–1994).
- Chaser, 15, American Border Collie with the largest-tested non-human memory.
- Aleksandr Chumakov, 92, Russian Olympic sailor (1952, 1956).
- Maxim Dadashev, 28, Russian NABF super lightweight champion boxer, head injuries sustained in match.
- Ruth Gotlieb, 96, British-born New Zealand politician, Wellington City Councillor (1983–2001).
- Jan Hrbatý, 77, Czech ice hockey player, Olympic silver medallist (1968).
- Peter Horn, 84, Czech-born South African writer and critic, cancer.
- Danny Keogh, 71, Ugandan-born South African actor (Invictus, Zulu, The Red Sea Diving Resort).
- Gabe Khouth, 46, Canadian actor (It, Mobile Suit Gundam SEED, Once Upon a Time), cardiac arrest.
- Pavel Kučera, 79, Czech lawyer and judge, vice president of the Supreme Court of the Czech Republic.
- Nika McGuigan, 33, Irish actress (Can't Cope, Won't Cope, Philomena, The Secret Scripture), cancer.
- Charan Narzary, 86, Indian politician, MP (1977–1980), complications from a fall.
- Dorothy Olsen, 103, American aviator.
- Bobby Park, 73, English footballer (Aston Villa, Wrexham, Hartlepool United), cancer.
- Michael Roth, 83, German engineer.
- Sir Patrick Sheehy, 88, British businessman (BAT Industries).
- Yuriy Shlyakhov, 36, Ukrainian Olympic diver (2008), heart disease.
- Barney Smith, 98, American plumber, artist and museum curator.
- Ferdinand von Bismarck, 88, German landowner and lawyer.
- Thomas Milton Weatherald, 81, Canadian politician, MLA (1964–1975).
- Lois Wille, 87, American journalist, Pulitzer Prize winner (1963, 1989), stroke.

=== 24 ===
- Claes Andersson, 82, Finnish writer, psychiatrist and politician, MP (1987–1999, 2007–2008).
- Sarah Andrews, American geologist and author, plane crash.
- David Caplan, 54, Canadian politician, MPP (1997–2011).
- Sammy Chapman, 81, Northern Irish football player (Mansfield Town, Portsmouth) and manager (Wolves).
- Chen Hu, 57, Chinese military physician and stem cell researcher, heart attack.
- Mathias J. DeVito, 88, American lawyer and businessman, CEO of The Rouse Company (1979–1994), kidney failure.
- Sergio Di Giulio, 74, Italian voice actor and actor (One Hamlet Less).
- Bernard Evans, 82, English footballer (Oxford United, Wrexham, Queens Park Rangers).
- Margaret Fulton, 94, Scottish-born Australian chef and cookbook writer (The Margaret Fulton Cookbook).
- Luis González, 93, Colombian Olympic swimmer.
- Hwang Byungsng, 49, South Korean poet. (body found on this date)
- Cathy Inglese, 60, American college basketball coach (Vermont, Boston College, Rhode Island), fall.
- Ajoy Mukhopadhyay, 90, Indian politician.
- Nam Gi-nam, 77, South Korean film director (Night Fairy), cancer.
- Alfred G. Redfield, 90, American physicist and biochemist.
- Sir Frederick Sowrey, 96, British air marshal.
- Jaime Trobo, 62, Uruguayan politician, Minister of Sports and Youth (2000–2002) and Deputy (since 1990), cancer.
- Trudy, 63, American gorilla, world's oldest gorilla in captivity.
- Manfred Uhlig, 91, German actor (Hands Up or I'll Shoot).
- José Vidal, 81, Venezuelan footballer (Deportivo Lara, national team).
- Roger Warren, 75, Canadian miner and murderer.

=== 25 ===
- Giorgio Arlorio, 90, Italian film director and screenwriter (The Shortest Day, Ogro, Once Upon a Crime).
- Simon Bendall, 82, English numismatist.
- Michael J. Buckley, 87, American Jesuit priest and philosophical theologian.
- Anner Bylsma, 85, Dutch cellist.
- Peter Edwards, 88, British-born Canadian vexillologist.
- Farouk El-Fishawy, 67, Egyptian actor (The Suspect), cancer.
- Beji Caid Essebsi, 92, Tunisian politician, President (since 2014), Prime Minister (2011), and Minister of Foreign Affairs (1981–1986).
- Curt Faudon, 70, Austrian film director.
- John Ferriter, 59, American talent agent (William Morris Agency) and producer, complications from pancreatitis.
- Georg, Duke of Hohenberg, 90, Austrian aristocrat, Head of the House of Hohenberg (since 1977).
- Asao Hirano, 92, Japanese medical researcher, discoverer of Hirano bodies.
- Jesper Juul, 71, Danish author, pneumonia.
- Jorma Kinnunen, 77, Finnish javelin thrower, Olympic silver medalist (1968).
- M. Owen Lee, 89, American Roman Catholic priest and music scholar.
- Mihai Mandache, 58, Romanian Olympic swimmer (1980).
- Danny McCarthy, 76, Welsh footballer (Cardiff City, Abergavenny Thursdays, Merthyr Tydfil). (death announced on this date)
- Jimmy Patton, 87, British comedian (Patton Brothers, ChuckleVision), cancer.
- Pierre Péan, 81, French journalist and author.
- P. J. Qualter, 76, Irish hurler (Galway).
- Scott Rubenstein, 71, American television writer and story editor (Star Trek: The Next Generation).
- Óscar Enrique Sánchez, 64, Guatemalan Olympic footballer (1976), (Comunicaciones, national team).
- Victor Swenson, 83, American educator.
- Bruce Webster, 91, Australian broadcaster and politician, member of the New South Wales Legislative Assembly for Pittwater (1975–1978).

=== 26 ===
- Richard Berg, 78, American wargame designer.
- Boris Bračulj, 79, Croatian football player and manager.
- Hugh Brogan, 83, British historian and biographer.
- Arnie Brown, 77, Canadian ice hockey player (New York Rangers, Detroit Red Wings, Toronto Maple Leafs).
- Mohamed E. El-Hawary, 76, Egyptian-born Canadian scientist.
- Lillian Faralla, 94, American baseball player (South Bend Blue Sox).
- Graham Freudenberg, 85, Australian political speechwriter.
- Monty Gordon, 87, Canadian Olympic bobsledder (1964).
- Roger Hoggett, 77, Australian rules footballer (Carlton).
- Hwung Hwung-hweng, 72, Taiwanese hydraulic engineer, founder and chairman of the Ocean Affairs Council (2018–2019).
- Christoforos Liontakis, 74, Greek poet and translator.
- Bryan Magee, 89, British philosopher and politician, MP (1974–1983).
- Joan Martin, 85, American baseball player (South Bend Blue Sox).
- T. K. Nallappan, 87, Indian politician, MLA (1980–1985).
- Ken Okoth, 41, Kenyan politician, cancer.
- Jaime Lucas Ortega y Alamino, 82, Cuban Roman Catholic cardinal, Archbishop of San Cristóbal de la Habana (1981–2016), pancreatic cancer.
- Vivian Paley, 90, American educator.
- Pascual Rabal Petriz, 89, Spanish politician, Senator (1996–2000) and Mayor of Jaca (1995–1999).
- Alberto Ponce, 84, Spanish classical guitarist and teacher.
- Attoor Ravi Varma, 88, Indian poet and translator, pneumonia.
- Mario Cerciello Rega, 35, Italian police officer, stabbed.
- Kevin Roster, 36, American poker player and assisted suicide advocate, assisted suicide.
- Gene Rychlak, 50-51, American powerlifter, heart condition.
- Dagfinn Stenseth, 82, Norwegian diplomat.
- Russi Taylor, 75, American voice actress (Disney's House of Mouse, The Simpsons, DuckTales), colon cancer.
- Bill Walker, 85, American football player (Edmonton Eskimos).
- Marty Wilson, 62, British poker player, cancer.

=== 27 ===
- Zenon Begier, 83, Polish Olympic athlete (1960, 1964).
- Chester Caddas, 83, American football coach (Pacific Tigers, Colorado State Rams).
- Tom Campbell, 81, Scottish philosopher.
- Paul Connerton, 79, British social anthropologist.
- Carlos Cruz-Diez, 95, Venezuelan artist.
- Dianne Foster, 90, Canadian actress (Bad for Each Other, Drive a Crooked Road, The Violent Men).
- Andrew Golden, 33, American convicted murderer, traffic collision.
- Fanny Hopeau, 74, American Olympic volleyball player.
- Graham Johnston, 89, South African Olympic swimmer.
- Johann Kresnik, 79, Austrian dancer, choreographer, and theater director.
- Edward Lewis, 99, American film producer (Spartacus, Grand Prix, Missing).
- Keith Lincoln, 80, American football player (San Diego Chargers).
- Humphrey Mijnals, 88, Surinamese-born Dutch footballer (Robinhood, DOS Utrecht, national team).
- Harry Orr, 74, Canadian ice hockey player.
- Mike Roarke, 88, American baseball player and coach (Detroit Tigers, St. Louis Cardinals, San Diego Padres).
- Işılay Saygın, 72, Turkish politician.
- John Robert Schrieffer, 88, American physicist, Nobel laureate (1972).
- Samprada Singh, 94, Indian generic drug manufacturer, founder of Alkem Laboratories.
- Roman Virastyuk, 51, Ukrainian Olympic shot putter (1996, 2000, 2004), complications of heart surgery.

=== 28 ===
- Valerik Apinian, 69, Armenian painter.
- Ferruh Bozbeyli, 92, Turkish politician, Chairman of the Democratic Party (1970–1978) and Speaker of the Grand National Assembly (1965–1970).
- Ian Drohan, 86, Australian football player (St Kilda Football Club).
- Walter Fiers, 88, Belgian molecular biologist.
- Eduardo Gómez, 68, Spanish actor and comedian (Aquí no hay quien viva, La que se avecina, Butterfly's Tongue), cancer.
- Patrick J. Hanratty, 88, American computer scientist.
- John W. Harbaugh, 92, American geologist.
- George Hilton, 85, Uruguayan actor (The Masked Man Against the Pirates, The Brute and the Beast, Man Called Invincible).
- Peter Bonu Johnson, 56, Gambian football player and manager (national team).
- Vladimir Kara-Murza Sr., 59, Russian journalist and TV host, co-founder of NTV.
- Li Jisheng, 76, Chinese aerospace engineer.
- Norma Matheson, 89, American politician.
- Peter McConnell, 82, English footballer (Carlisle United, Leeds United, Bradford City).
- Loek van Mil, 34, Dutch baseball player (Curaçao Neptunus, Tohoku Rakuten Golden Eagles, national team).
- Michael Moxon, 77, British Anglican cleric, Dean of Truro (1998–2004).
- Howard Nathan, 47, American basketball player (DePaul Blue Demons, Atlanta Hawks).
- George Parshall, 89, American chemist.
- Bartolo Pellegrino, 84, Italian politician, Sicilian Regional Deputy (1971–1976, 1991–2003), founder of the New Sicily party.
- Jaipal Reddy, 77, Indian politician, Minister of Earth Sciences and Science and Technology (2012–2014) and MP (1984–2014), pneumonia.
- Cesare Rizzi, 79, Italian politician, Deputy (1996–2006).
- Richard Rosenbaum, 88, American judge, member of the New York Supreme Court (1970–1972), chairman of the New York Republican State Committee (1972–1977).
- Donkupar Roy, 64, Indian politician, Chief Minister of Meghalaya (2008–2009), stomach disease.
- Bandar bin Abdulaziz Al Saud, 96, Saudi royal.
- M. K. Seetharam Kulal, 79, Indian Tulu-Kannada dramatist.
- Yuu Shimaka, 70, Japanese voice actor (Kingdom Hearts, Ergo Proxy, Code Geass).
- Ruth de Souza, 98, Brazilian actress (The Landowner's Daughter, Macumba Love, A Glass of Rage), pneumonia.
- Richard Stone, 90, American politician, U.S. Senator (1975–1980), Secretary of State of Florida (1971–1974) and Ambassador to Denmark (1991–1993), complications from pneumonia.
- Kevin Stonehouse, 59, English footballer (Blackburn Rovers, Blackpool, Carlisle United).
- Sy Tomashoff, 96, American production designer (Ryan's Hope, Dark Shadows, The Bold and the Beautiful).
- Stanley Weintraub, 90, American historian and author.
- Harrison B. Wilson, 94, American basketball coach and educator, President of Norfolk State University (1975–1997).
- Lawrence Wrightsman, 87, American psychologist.

=== 29 ===
- Egil Danielsen, 85, Norwegian javelin thrower, Olympic champion (1956).
- Max Falkenstien, 95, American radio sportscaster (University of Kansas).
- Asghar Ghandchi, 91, Iranian entrepreneur.
- Edmond Gionet, 88, American politician, member of the New Hampshire House of Representatives (2002–2016).
- Doris Goddard, 89, Australian cabaret singer and actress.
- Mukesh Goud, 60, Indian politician, cancer.
- Traian Ivănescu, 86, Romanian football player and coach.
- Shamim Kabir, 74, Bangladeshi cricketer, cancer.
- Joyce Laboso, 58, Kenyan politician, Deputy Speaker of the National Assembly (2008–2017) and Governor of Bomet County (since 2017), cancer.
- Enrique Lafourcade, 91, Chilean writer, critic and journalist.
- Tom Manning, 73, American terrorist (United Freedom Front).
- Vasil Metodiev, 84, Bulgarian footballer (Akademik Sofia, Lokomotiv Sofia, Dobrudzha Dobrich)
- Mona-Liisa Nousiainen, 36, Finnish Olympic cross-country skier (2014), cancer.
- Vitthal Radadiya, 60, Indian politician, MP (2009–2014), cancer.
- Ras G, 40, American hip hop producer (Brainfeeder) and disc jockey.
- Archie Roboostoff, 67, American Olympic footballer (1972).
- Tuvya Ruebner, 95, Israeli poet and translator.
- V. G. Siddhartha, 60, Indian businessman and founder of Café Coffee Day, suicide by jumping.
- Zdeněk Srstka, 83, Czech Olympic weightlifter (1960), stuntman and actor (Poslední propadne peklu).
- Barbara Staff, 94, American political activist.
- Sam Trimble, 84, Australian cricketer (Queensland).
- Wang Qidong, 97, Chinese materials scientist and politician, Vice President of Zhejiang University (1978–1984), Vice Chairman of Zhejiang People's Congress.
- Werner von Moltke, 83, German decathlete, European champion (1966).
- John Wybrow, 91, New Zealand politician and diplomat.

=== 30 ===
- Jean Arasanayagam, 87, Sri Lankan poet and fiction writer.
- Morton Bahr, 93, American labor union leader, pancreatic cancer.
- Albert W. Bally, 94, American geologist.
- Marcian Bleahu, 95, Romanian geologist, writer and politician, Senator (1990–1992, 1996–2000) and Minister of the Environment (1991–1992).
- Nick Buoniconti, 78, American Hall of Fame football player (Miami Dolphins, Boston Patriots) and medical research advocate (Miami Project to Cure Paralysis).
- Deep Impact, 17, Japanese champion racehorse (Japanese Triple Crown, Japan Cup) and sire, euthanised.
- Antonio Franchi, 83, Italian racing cyclist.
- Subir Gokarn, 59, Indian economist, Deputy Governor of the Reserve Bank of India (2009–2013).
- Ron Hughes, 89, Welsh football player (Chester, Holywell Town) and manager (Mold Alexandra).
- John Humble, 63, British hoaxer, claimed to be the Yorkshire Ripper.
- Mari Carmen Izquierdo, 69, Spanish sports journalist (Televisión Española, Marca), pancreatic cancer.
- W. Roy McCutcheon, 89, Canadian college administrator, President of Seneca College (1984–1992).
- Giancarlo Morresi, 74, Italian Olympic pentathlete.
- Malcolm Nash, 74, Welsh cricketer.
- John Petroske, 84, American Olympic silver medallist ice hockey player (1956).
- Rebecca Roeber, 61, American politician, member of the Missouri House of Representatives (since 2015).
- Karsten Schubert, 57, German art dealer, medullary thyroid cancer.
- Don Suggs, 74, American artist.
- Ian Van Bellen, 73, English rugby union and rugby league player.
- R. Verman, 72, Indian art director (Jewel Thief, Guide, Hum), heart attack.
- Zhao Zhihong, 46, Chinese serial killer and rapist, executed by firing squad.

=== 31 ===
- Martín Arzola Ortega, 42, Mexican convicted drug lord (Jalisco New Generation Cartel), shot.
- Marcel Berlins, 77, French legal journalist, brain haemorrhage.
- Chen Shunyao, 101, Chinese politician and academic administrator, deputy party secretary of Tsinghua University.
- John K. Davis, 92, American general.
- María Auxiliadora Delgado, 82, Uruguayan civil servant, First Lady (2005–2010, since 2015), heart attack.
- Harold Dull, 83, American underwater bodyworker and poet.
- Brendan Fennelly, 63, Irish hurling manager and player.
- Redmond Finney, 89, American football player (Princeton Tigers).
- Charles François, 96, Belgian scientist.
- Armand Jung, 68, French politician, Deputy (1997–2016).
- Hamza bin Laden, 29–30, Saudi jihadist (al-Qaeda), shot. (death announced on this date)
- Iraj Lalezari, 89, Iranian-born American academic.
- George I. Mavrodes, 92, American philosopher.
- Raffaele Pisu, 94, Italian comedian and actor (Susanna Whipped Cream, Weekend, Italian Style, The Consequences of Love), Nastro d'Argento winner (2005).
- Sherm Poppen, 89, American engineer and inventor.
- O. Leonard Press, 97, American broadcaster.
- Harold Prince, 91, American theatre director and producer (The Phantom of the Opera, Fiddler on the Roof, West Side Story).
- Steve Sawyer, 63, American environmentalist and activist, Executive Director of Greenpeace, co-founder of the Global Wind Energy Council, pneumonia and lung cancer.
- John Scarlett, 72, Australian footballer (Geelong, South Melbourne).
- Steve Talboys, 52, English footballer (Wimbledon, Watford).
- Jean-Luc Thérier, 73, French rally driver.
- Guido Vandone, 89, Italian footballer (Torino).
