= Richard Thorne =

Richard Thorne may refer to:

- Richard M. Thorne, American physicist
- Richard Thorne Thorne, British physician
