= Mohan Das =

Mohan Das may refer to:

- Lotan Baba, Indian holy man
- Mohan Das (politician), Indian politician
