= Pavel Kučera =

Pavel Kučera is the name of:

- Pavel Kučera (footballer), Czech footballer
- Pavel Kučera (lawyer), Czech lawyer
