= Philibert Tembo Nlandu =

Congolese Catholic prelate (born 1962)

The Most Reverend Philibert Tembo Nlandu
- Bishop of Budjala, Democratic Republic of the Congo
- Church: Catholic Church
- Archdiocese: Roman Catholic Archdiocese of Mbandaka-Bikoro
- See: Roman Catholic Diocese of Budjala
- Appointed: 22 October 2009
- Installed: 22 October 2009
- Predecessor: Joseph Bolangi Egwanga Ediba Tasame
- Successor: Incumbent

Orders
- Ordination: 25 August 1991
- Consecration: 3 June 2007 by Joseph Bolangi Egwanga Ediba Tasame
- Rank: Bishop

Personal details
- Born: Philibert Tembo Nlandu; 3 November 1962 (age 63) Nganda Kikamba, Diocese of Boma, Kongo Central, Democratic Republic of the Congo

Styles of Philibert Tembo Nlandu
- Reference style: Your Lordship; The Most Reverend
- Spoken style: His Lordship
- Religious style: Bishop

Philibert Tembo Nlandu C.I.C.M. (born 3 November 1962) is a Congolese Catholic prelate who is the bishop of the Roman Catholic Diocese of Budjala in the Democratic Republic of the Congo since 22 October 2009. Before that, from 26 March 2007 until 22 October 2009, he was Coadjutor Bishop of the Catholic Diocese of Budjala. Prior to that, from 21 August 1991 until he was appointed bishop, he was a priest of the Order of the Congregation of the Immaculate Heart of Mary (CICM Missionaries). He was appointed bishop on 26 March 2007 by Pope Benedict XVI. He was consecrated as bishop on 3 June 2007.

== Background and education ==
He was born on 3 November 1962, in Nganda Kikamba, in the Diocese of Boma, Kongo Central, in the Democratic Congo. He attended the Mbata-Kiela Minor Seminary. He joined the Congregation of the Immaculate Heart of Mary (CICM Missionaries) in 1980. He studied philosophy at the Saint Augustine University of Kinshasa from 1982 until 1985. He then studied theology at Saint Cyprian Institute in Ngoya, in Cameroon (Ecole Théologique Saint Cyprien De Ngoya) from 1995 until 1988. He went on a mission that lasted four years, in Japan while specializing in theology from 1988 until 1991. He also took a course at the Institute for Religious Formation in the United States.

== Priest ==
He professed as a member of the CICM Missionaries in 1982. He was ordained a priest of the same religious Order on 25 August 1991. He served as a priest until 26 March 2007.

While a priest, he served in various roles including as:

- Theological mission in Japan from 1991 until 1997.
- Professor of theology in Manila, Philippines from 1998 until 2000.
- Provincial Superior of the Congregation of the Immaculate Heart of Mary in Kinshasa from 2000 until 2006.
- Vice president of the association of Major Superiors in Congo (ASUMA).
- President of ASUMA, Kinshasa.

== Bishop ==
On 26 March 2007, Pope Benedict XVI appointed Reverend Father Philibert Tembo Nlandu, C.I.C.M., previously Provincial Superior of the CICM Missionaries in Kinshasa, as Coadjutor Bishop of the diocese of Budjala in the Democratic Republic of the Congo.

He was consecrated and installed at Budjala, Democratic Republic of the Congo on 3 June 2007 by the hands of Bishop Joseph Bolangi Egwanga Ediba Tasame, Bishop of Budjala assisted by Archbishop Joseph Kumuondala Mbimba, Archbishop of Mbandaka-Bikoro and Bishop Cyprien Mbuka Di Nkuanga, Bishop of Boma.

On 22 October 2009, following the resignation of Bishop Joseph Bolangi Egwanga Ediba Tasame from the pastoral care of the Roman Catholic Diocese of Budjala in the Democratic Congo, The Holy Father appointed Philibert Tembo Nlandu, the Coadjutor Bishop of the Diocese of Budjala to succeed at Budjala.

== See also ==
- Catholic Church in the Democratic Republic of the Congo

== Succession table ==
Catholic Church titles
Preceded by	Coadjutor Bishop of Budjala (26 March 2007 - 22 October 2009)	Succeeded by
Preceded by Joseph Bolangi Egwanga Ediba Tasame (24 January 1974 - 22 October 2009)	Bishop of Budjala (since 22 October 2009)	Succeeded by Incumbent
