= New Sicily =

New Sicily Nuova Sicilia
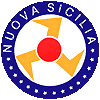
- Leader: Bartolo Pellegrino
- Founded: 20 April 2001
- Dissolved: 13 February 2008
- Ideology: Autonomism; Federalism

New Sicily (Italian: Nuova Sicilia, NS) was a regionalist social-democratic political party based in Sicily. Its founder and leader was Bartolo Pellegrino.

It was composed mainly by former members of the regional section of the Italian Socialist Party and the Sicilian Action Party.

The party was affiliated to the House of Freedoms, the centre-right coalition led by Silvio Berlusconi. It participated in the national general election, obtaining 33,437 votes, and the Sicilian regional election of 2006, in a joint ticket with the Movement for Autonomy, obtaining 308,219 (12.5% of regional votes) and ten seats in the Sicilian Regional Assembly.

== See also ==
- Southern Italy autonomist movements
