= Odell S. Williams Now And Then African-American Museum =

African-American history museum in Baton Rouge, Louisiana

Baton Rouge African-American Museum
- Odell S. Williams Now And Then African-American Museum

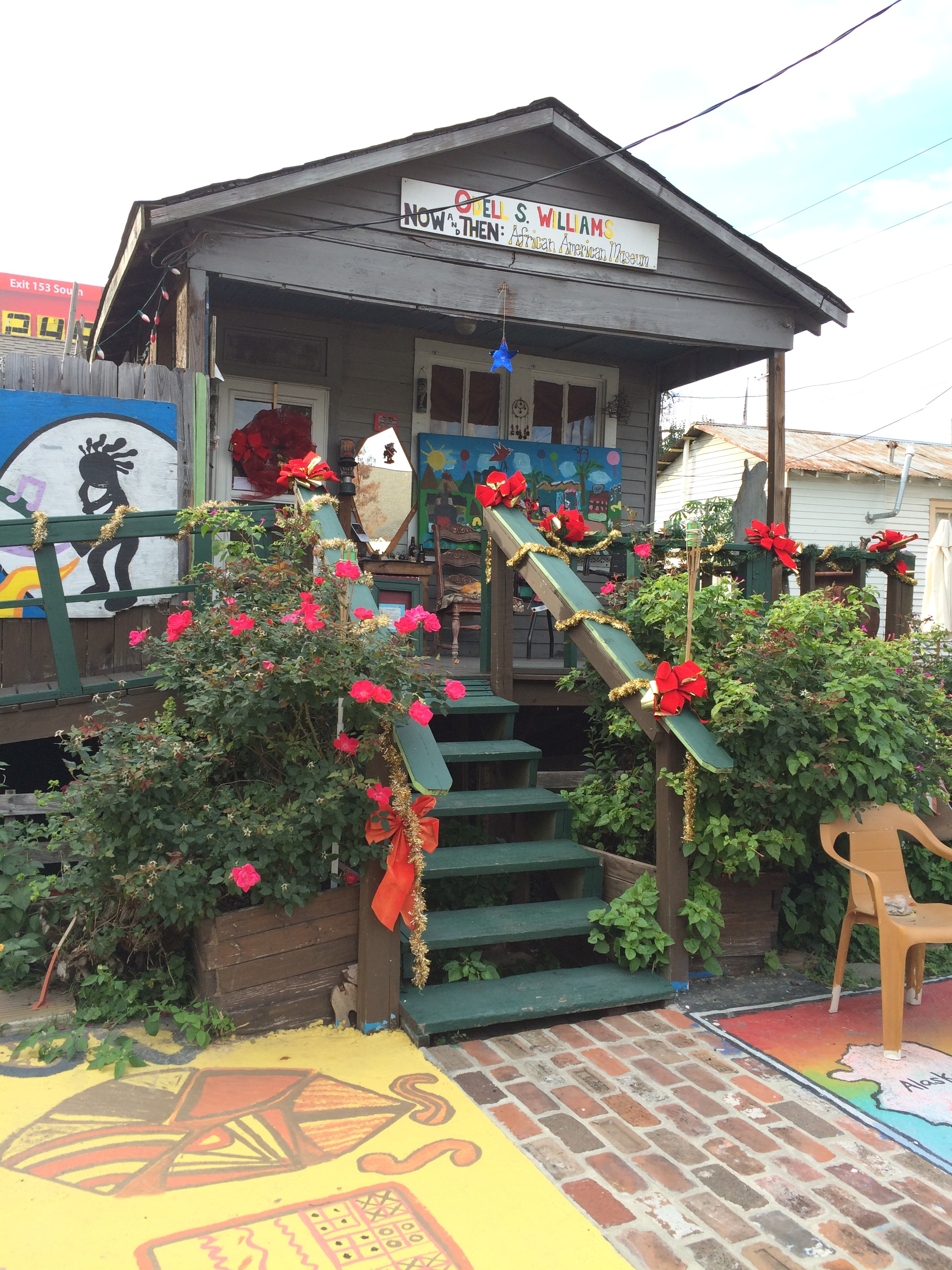
- Front entrance to museum
- Established: 2001
- Location: 805 Saint Louis Street; Baton Rouge, Louisiana 70802
- Coordinates: 30.4407328°N 91.1880465°W
- Type: History museum
- Collections: African-American history
- Founder: Sadie Roberts-Joseph
- Website: www.braamuseum.org

The Odell S. Williams Now And Then African-American History Museum or the Baton Rouge African-American Museum, is a non-profit museum of African-American history and heritage located in Baton Rouge, Louisiana, United States. The museum is named for Odell S. Williams, an educator in Baton Rouge, Louisiana. Founded by Sadie Roberts-Joseph in 2001, the museum remains the only museum dedicated to African and African American history in the city. The museum celebrates Juneteenth, Black History Month, and American history year round.

== History ==
Sadie Roberts-Joseph, curator and founder, established the African American Museum after seeing the need and importance of having it in the community. She often told visitors, "Culture is the glue that holds a people together. Take a step back in time and leap into your future."

Roberts-Joseph maintained the museum on her own from its founding until her death in 2019. After her death, her son Jason and his sister took over the management. The museum closed for a short time for COVID-19, but reopened in time for Juneteenth 2020. It receives no federal or local funding.

== See also ==
- List of museums in Louisiana
- Louisiana African American Heritage Trail
- List of museums focused on African Americans
