= Barbara Zatler =

Danish actress, TV personality, businesswoman and model

- Born: Barbara Darinka Zatler; 7 November 1980; Horsens, Denmark
- Died: 7 July 2019 (aged 38); Copenhagen, Denmark
- Occupations: Businesswoman, media personality, glamour model, actress
- Years active: 2002–2019
- Height: 5 ft 7 in (1.70 m)
- Website: www.barbara-zatler.dk

Barbara Darinka Zatler (7 November 1980 – 7 July 2019) was a Danish actress, TV personality, businesswoman, and model.

Barbara was nominated in Euroman magazine, Denmark's biggest lifestyle magazine, where she was nominated as one of ten remarkable people in Denmark 2010.

Barbara was featured in magazines like GQ South Africa, Maxim magazine Slovenia, Greece and FHM magazine in Denmark, the United States, India, Turkey, Lime, Q, ALT for Damerne magazine and worked with photographers like Anders Overgaard, Isak Hoffmeier, Nicky De Silva and Michael Vincent.

== Life and career ==
Barbara Darinka Zatler began her modelling career when discovered in 2002, subsequently building an international career and appearing in numerous magazines worldwide, including the Slovenian Playboy cover 'Playmate of the month' in September 2009. She was an international playmate in countries like the Netherlands, Romania, Poland and US.

At the age of 27 Barbara moved from Aarhus to Copenhagen. She began her acting career in 2007, starring in 2010's Clown The Movie by Mikkel Søndergaard, Teddy Bear by Mads Matthiesen in 2011, and the TV series 2900 Happiness on Danish pay television channel, TV3, and the TV2 Zulu episodes of the series Kristian.

Her fame grew with appearances in Playboy magazine and further appearances in both TV and film. She also worked in comedy at Douglas Entertainment, home of Danish comedy personalities, Casper Christensen, Frank Hvam and Lars Hjortshøj.

She appeared as a guest star on several radio shows such as P3 morning, The Voice, SLR radio, GO fm Aarhus, Twin Towers radio USA and Playboy Radio USA, where she also performed in stand-up and won the prize as funniest bunny of the year 2010.

She appeared in Danish TV shows such as Go'aften Danmark, Aften Showet, Go' Morgen Danmark, Zulu Djævleræs, and Aloha.

In April 2015 she gave birth to a girl.

She died on 7 July 2019. The cause is yet to be known.
