= Michael Seidenberg =

New York City bookstore owner and salon host

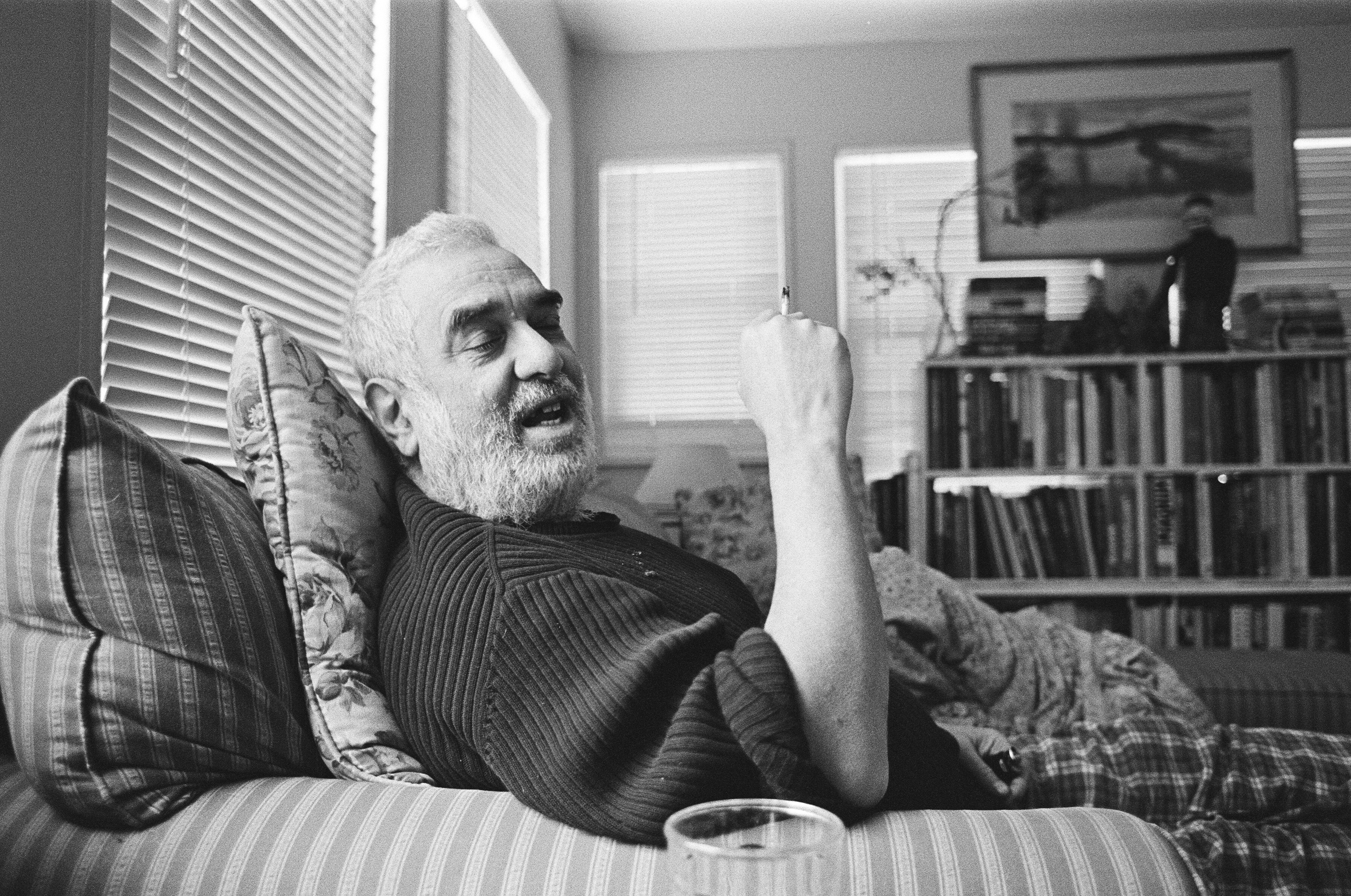
- Born: July 22, 1954
- Died: July 8, 2019 (aged 64)
- Occupation: book seller

Michael Seidenberg (July 22, 1954 – July 8, 2019) was a New York City bookstore owner and writer. His shop, BrazenHead Books, was a secret bookstore, its last incarnation a by-appointment-only space, hidden behind a door in his Manhattan apartment.

The store was described as one of the "world's most stunning bookstores" by Fodor's in 2014. Seidenberg regularly ran literary salons in the space, described as "more like a salon than a for-profit business" by The New York Times. BrazenHead became known more for its get-togethers and the literary atmosphere than as a bookstore. "Literary culture has become far too corporate — Michael and Brazenhead are reminders of how and why to love books and authors," said novelist Porochista Khakpour. Jonathan Lethem was an early bookstore employee as a teenager, and wrote Seidenberg as a character into two of his novels.

Seidenberg wrote a series of advice columns for The New Inquiry called Unsolicited Advice for Living in the End Times which were published in two collected volumes.

== Personal life ==
Seidenberg was born in Williamsburg, Brooklyn and grew up in New York City. He studied drama at Queensborough Community College. His first job was as a puppeteer, and he ran his troupe from a storefront in Brooklyn in the 1970s, a space which also became the first iteration of BrazenHead. He was married to Nicky Roe who worked as a circulation manager for Rolling Stone.
