= Pascual Rabal Petriz =

Spanish politician (1930–2019)

Pascual Rabal Petriz (9 June 1930 – 26 July 2019) was a Spanish politician who served as a Senator.

== Biography ==
Petriz began his professional career in banking, eventually becoming the director of the Caja Rural de Aragón branch in Jaca.

In 1982, he began their political career as a provincial deputy for Huesca, with the Union of Democratic Centre party. Later on, he became a councillor for the Popular Party in the Jaca City Council. In the municipal elections of 1995, the Popular Party nearly won an absolute majority with 43% of the votes, leading to Petriz's appointment as mayor of the capital of the region of La Jacetania. One of Petriz's toughest moments during his time in office was the Biescas camping flood, which caused 87 deaths and 187 injuries.

During his mayoral term, Petriz also served as a senator and a provincial deputy. Specifically, after running as a candidate for the Popular Party-Aragonese Party coalition (PP-PAR), he managed to enter the Upper House as a senator for Huesca (1996-2000).

In 2010, Petriz was part of the consortium that was created to promote Jaca's candidacy for the 2022 Winter Olympics.

He was also the president of the Casino Union Jaquesa from 1979 to 1993.

Petriz was married to Juana Sanromán Bodega. They had three children: Pilar, Ignacio, and Teresa; and one grandchild, Guillermo.

After his passing, the City Council of Jaca declared two days of mourning and placed a condolence book in the town hall's foyer.
