= Bobbie Lea Bennett =

American disability and transgender rights activist (1947 – 2019)

- Born: March 31, 1947
- Died: July 18, 2019 (aged 72); Covington, Louisiana, U.S.
- Occupation: Activist
- Known for: Disability activism, transgender activism

Bobbie Lea Bennett (March 31, 1947 – July 18, 2019) was an American disability and transgender rights activist. In 1978, she drove from San Diego, California to Baltimore, Maryland to demand that Medicare honor its agreement to reimburse payment for her sex reassignment surgery; her successful claim brought visibility to efforts to secure rights for transgender people.

== Personal life ==
Bobbie Lea Bennett was born March 31, 1947. She used a wheelchair due to osteogenesis imperfecta, a rare bone disease.

In 1981, her family was in the news as her sister acted as a surrogate to bear Bennett's child.

== Fight for Medicare coverage ==
To qualify for sex reassignment surgery, the Gender Identity Clinic in Galveston, Texas required Bennett to live as a woman for four years to determine whether she was a suitable candidate. Bennett had been told that the cost of her surgeries would be covered by Medicare under the disability benefits program of Social Security, but after the surgery, her claims were denied without explanation. Transition, a magazine dedicated to transgender rights, reported in June 1978 that Medicare offices had been flooded with phone calls opposing taxpayer funding for sex reassignment surgery.

Public interest in protection and rights for disabled people had recently been increased due to revelations of abuse at Willowbrook State School, and Bennett was able to mobilize media interest and generate public outrage on her behalf. Her status as a disabled person made her an ideal legal test case for Medicare coverage: while other patients had to build an argument that transsexualism was a disability, Bennett was already covered by Medicare. Historian Nicholas Matte writes:

Her case forced Medicare to consider only one issue: whether or not Medicare would consider sex reassignment surgery a legitimate medical treatment, separate from whether otherwise healthy transsexuals would be considered disabled simply by virtue of being transsexual. These controversial questions engaged not only transsexuals but also health insurers, government administrators, and sometimes the broader American public, as they involved public spending of taxpayers' money.

After rallying the community behind her, Bennett set off on a cross-country trip, driving from her home in San Diego to the White House in Washington, D.C. She then drove to the Baltimore office of Thomas M. Tierney, the director of Medicare, refusing to leave until he agreed to meet with her. Tierney told her during their meeting a committee was determining the validity of her claim. Bennett received a check in the mail for $4,600 three days after meeting with Tierney. Transition magazine reported that the Medicare office denied that the check was for reimbursement of the surgery, instead claiming they were correcting a bureaucratic error of payments owed. In April 1978, Tierney said a new policy would extend Medicare coverage to sex reassignment, as long as the candidate had "at least one year's experience living as a member of the opposite sex".

== Other activism work and death ==
Bennett was the founder of the St. Tammany Organization for the Handicapped. She also hosted "Barbie's Talk Show," an Austin, Texas community television program which she used to raise awareness of accessibility issues.

She died in Covington, Louisiana on July 18, 2019.

== Legacy ==
Emily Driver's Great Race Through Time and Space, a 2020 play written by A.A. Brenner and Gregg Mozgala, was inspired by Bennett's story. The play follows a 12-year-old girl who travels across the U.S. after being denied access to a wheelchair, meeting disability rights leaders throughout history.
