= Olga Vyalikova =

Russian film and theater actress (1954–2019)

- Born: Olga Vyalikova; 26 March 1954
- Died: 15 July 2019 (aged 65)
- Occupation: actress

Olga Vyalikova (26 March 1954 – 15 July 2019) was a Russian film and theater actress. She graduated from the Boris Schukin Theatre Institute in 1975.

== Filmography ==
- 1978 — Любовь моя, печаль моя
- 1978 — An Ordinary Miracle
- 1982 — Похождения графа Невзорова
- 1983 — И жизнь, и слёзы, и любовь
- 2004 — Долгое прощание
