= Wayne Knox =

American politician (1927–2019)

Personal details
- Born: June 30, 1927 Denver, Colorado, U.S.
- Died: July 21, 2019 (aged 92) Denver, Colorado, U.S.
- Party: Democratic

Wayne Knox (June 30, 1927 - July 21, 2019) was an American politician in the state of Colorado. He served in the Colorado House of Representatives from 1960 to 1962 and 1975 to 1996. A retired teacher, Knox was a native to Denver and served as a Democrat.
