= André Pinçon =

French politician (1931–2019)

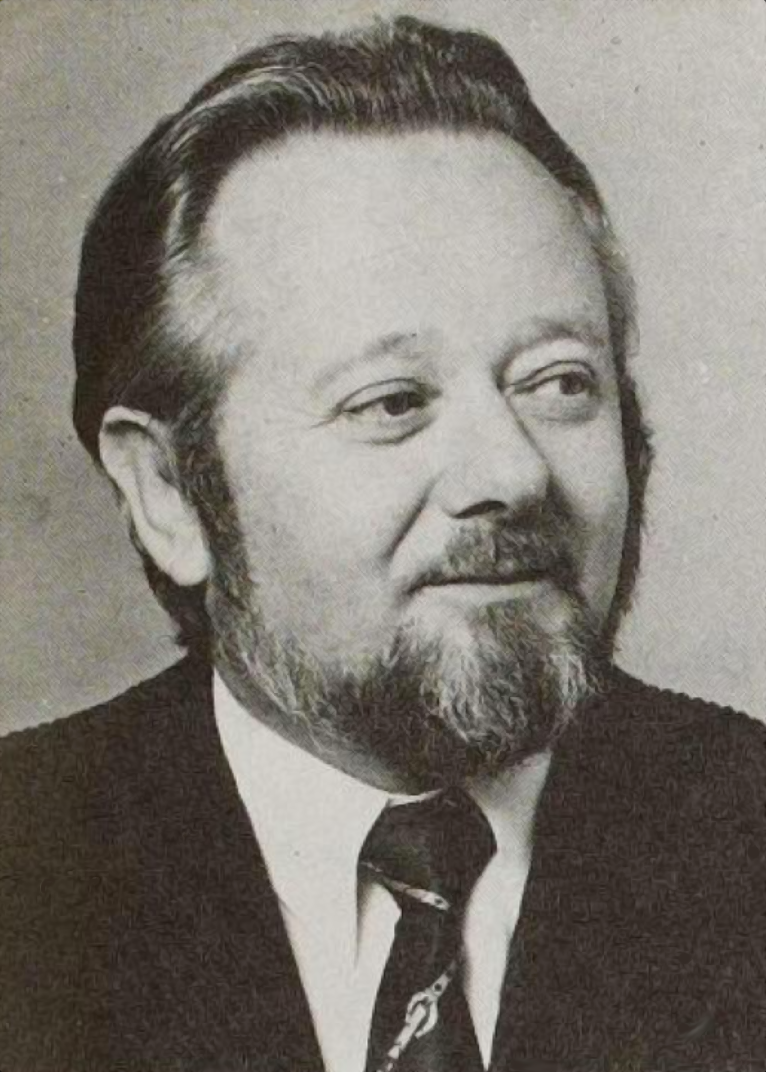

Deputy
- In office 1986–1988
- Preceded by: Robert Buron
- Succeeded by: Yves Patoux

Mayor of Laval
- In office 1973–1994

Personal details
- Born: 27 April 1931 Laval, France
- Died: 4 July 2019 (aged 88) Ernée, France
- Party: Socialist Party

André Pinçon (27 April 1931 – 4 July 2019) was a French politician who served as Mayor of Laval from 1973 to 1994.

The son of Arthur Pinçon and Constance Chevillard, he was married on 29 March 1956 to Yvonne Pussaud, with whom he had four children.

After he studied at Sacré-Cœur de Mayenne, he became an accountant.

André Pinçon died on 4 July 2019 in Ernée.

== Political career ==
He became a municipal councillor in Laval in 1971 under Robert Buron. After Buron's death, Pinçon assumed the role of Mayor. He would also join the Regional Council of Pays de la Loire.

In 1986, Pinçon ran against Jean-Paul Planchou for the role of Deputy. There was much opposition to Pinçon, as he would have been the first left-wing candidate elected in the Loire Region in the French Fifth Republic. He defeated Planchou, and received 22.14% of the overall vote. Pinçon lost re-election in 1988 when the voting system became single-member. In 1994, he resigned as Mayor of Laval, and left the job to his Deputy, Yves Patoux. However, Patoux would lose re-election to François d'Aubert in 1995.
