= Kevin Roster =

American poker player and activist (1983–2019)

- Born: March 9, 1983; College Point, Queens, New York City, U.S.
- Died: July 26, 2019 (aged 36); Rancho Cordova, California, U.S.
- Other name: Kevin Racks
- Occupations: Poker player, E-commerce business owner, collectibles expert
- Known for: Sarcoma awareness advocacy, "Right to Die" activist
- Website: MySarcomaCancerStory

Kevin "Racks" Gene Roster Jr. (March 9, 1983 – July 26, 2019) was an American with terminal sarcoma who moved to California to avail himself of the state's right-to-die legislation. He was an advocate for the legalization of medical aid in dying. He played in the 2019 World Series of Poker in the summer of 2019, and used the event as a platform to raise awareness about sarcoma and to encourage people to push for early detection and diagnosis.

== Life ==
Roster was born in College Point, Queens, New York City on March 9, 1983, to Debra Roster and Kevin Gene Roster, Sr. He built a successful family business specializing in collectible items.

Roster was diagnosed with sarcoma in 2017. After he found a lump in his leg, his physician ordered an MRI, and initially told him that his tumor was benign. Consequently, his diagnosis was delayed about four months, during which time he progressed from early stage 2 to late stage 3. He received eight rounds of chemotherapy, 44 radiation treatments, and three surgeries, including the amputation of his left leg. After his diagnosis, his wife took over the collectibles business, and Kevin dedicated the rest of his life to raising public awareness of sarcoma and early detection through his blog, YouTube videos, and playing poker. He played in the 2019 World Series of Poker.

Roster died via medical aid in dying in Rancho Cordova, California on July 26, 2019. Roster chronicled the process and appeared at several charity events before formally announcing his death.
