= George M. Browning Jr. =

U.S. Air Force general (1928–2019)

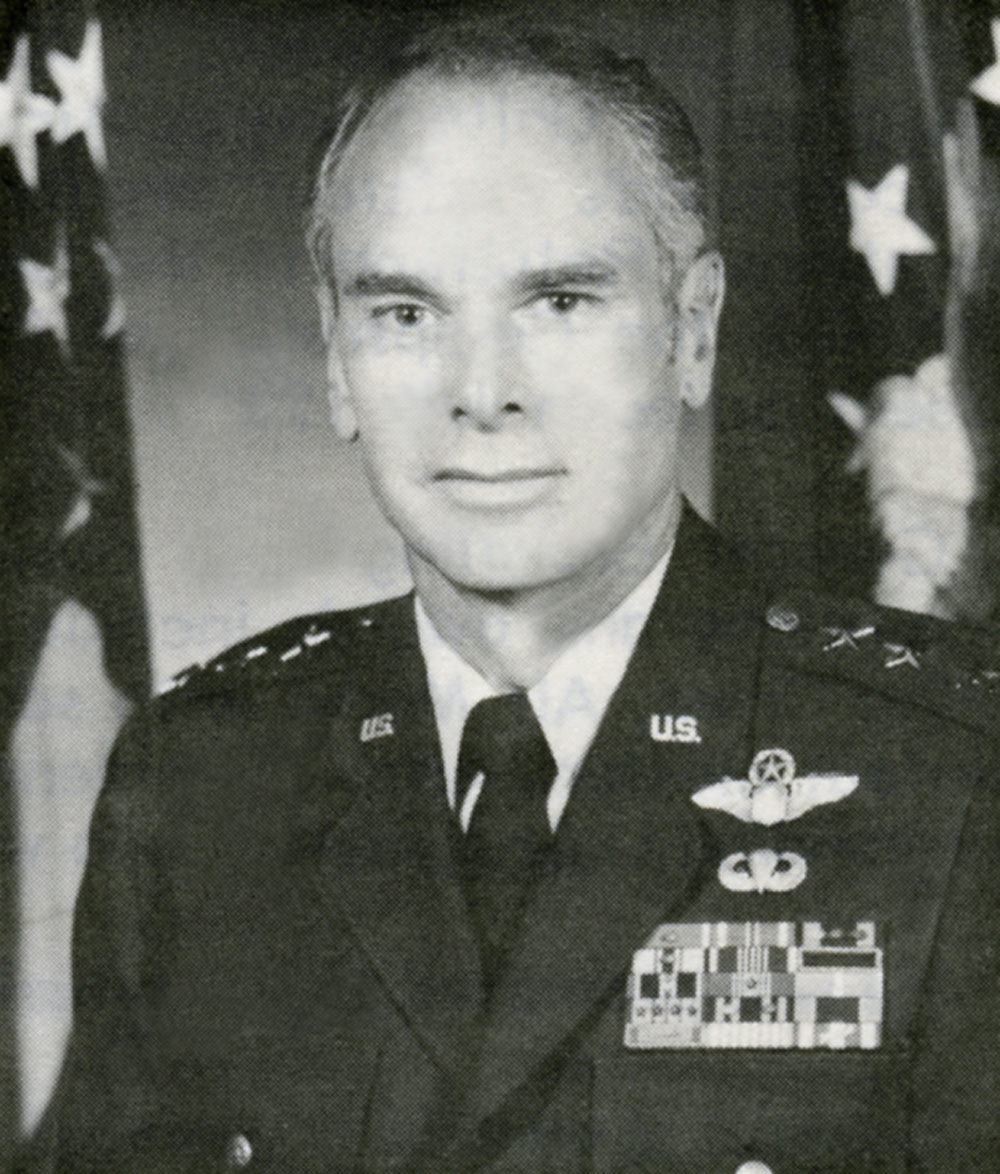
- Born: November 22, 1928; Kansas City, Missouri U.S.
- Died: July 7, 2019 (aged 90); Arlington, Virginia, U.S.
- Military career
- Allegiance: United States
- Branch: United States Air Force
- Service years: 1952–1984
- Rank: Lieutenant general
- Commands: Comptroller of the Air Force; Director of budget, Office of the Comptroller of the Air Force

George M. Browning Jr. (November 22, 1928 – July 7, 2019) was a lieutenant general in the United States Air Force who served as Comptroller of the United States Air Force from 1981 to 1984. He was commissioned through ROTC at the University of California, Los Angeles in 1952.

Browning died on July 7, 2019, in Arlington, Virginia, at the age of 90.
