= Cesare Rizzi =

Italian politician (1940–2019)

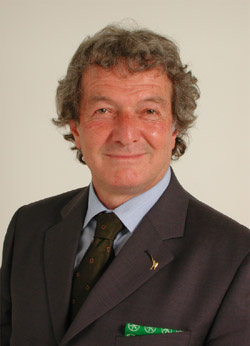
Cesare Rizzi

Cesare Rizzi (31 March 1940 – 28 July 2019) was an Italian politician who served as a Deputy.
