= Eberhard Kummer =

Austrian singer and lawyer (1940–2019)

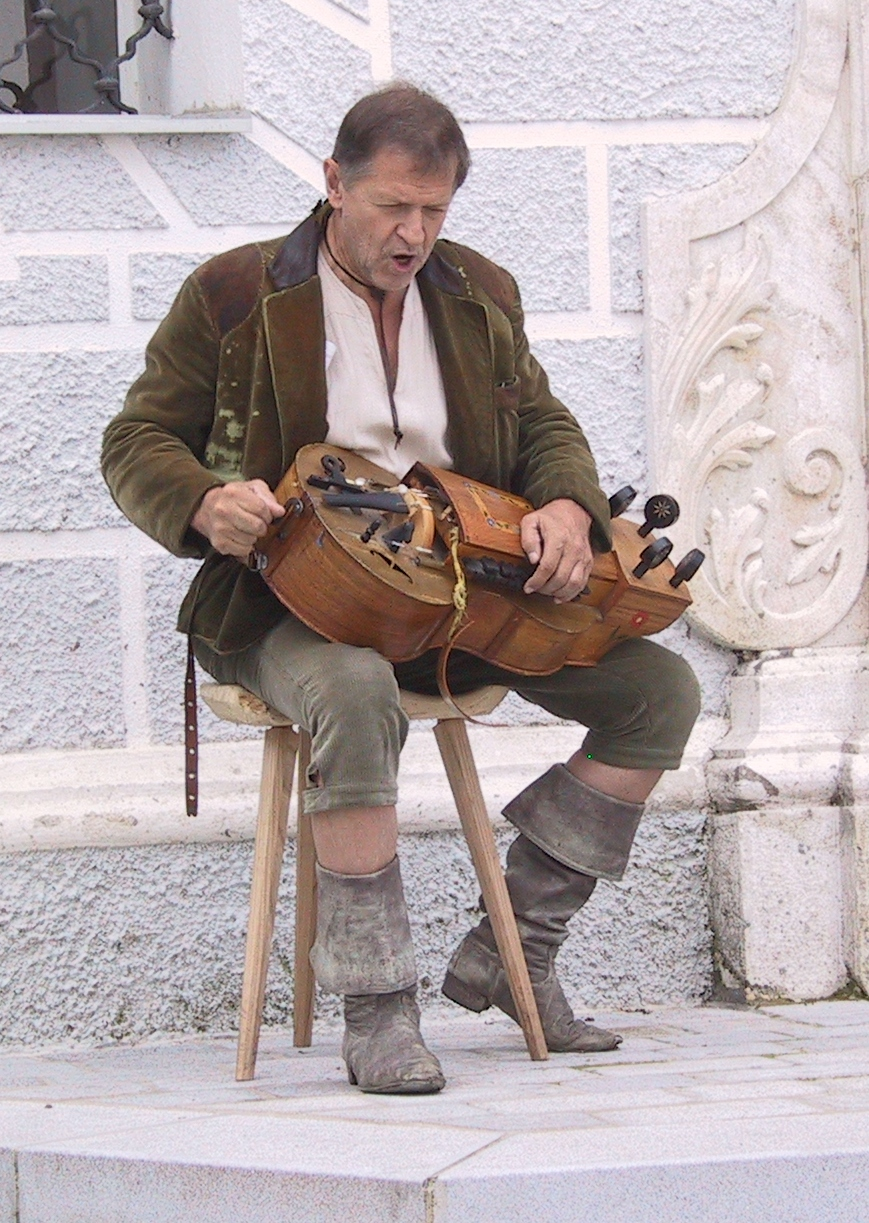
Eberhard Kummer in historical garb with a Hungarian hurdy-gurdy at the Ossiach Abbey, 2003

Eberhard Kummer (2 August 1940 – 12 July 2019) was an Austrian concert singer, lawyer and an expert of medieval music from Vienna.

Kummer was born in Krems an der Donau. He played the hurdy-gurdy, the harp and the guitar, and made important contribution to the restoration of medieval and the Austrian folksong. He received training as a classical bass-baritone. After an initial career as classical singer, he gradually specialized in restoring traditional Austrian folksongs and original medieval music from Europe, such as the German epic Nibelungenlied or medieval Minnelieder.

== Discography ==
=== Solo Recordings ===
1978, 1981: Alt-Wiener Volkslieder. Preiser Records, EMI-Electrola, Cologne (LPs und CDs)
1978: Der Mönch von Salzburg / Cesar Bresgen, Help Austria Records HAS 174.
1984: Das Nibelungenlied. Pan-Verlag, Wien (LP)
1984: Der Mord auf der Mölkerbastei. Pan-Verlag, Wien (LP)
1986: "Lieder und Reigen des Mittelalters - Neidhart von Reuental" . Pan-Verlag, Wien.(LP Nr. 117 001)
1987: Ballade von Wolf Dietrich und andere Balladen. Lyraphon, Salzburg (MC Nr. unbekannt)
1990: Max und Moritz von Wilhelm Busch. Extempore Records, Linz (MC LC 8075)
1993: Sentimentale Volkslieder vom Tod, von Räubern und Mördern gem. with Elisabeth Orth. Preiser Records, Vienna (CD)
1995: Das Buch von den Wienern – aufgeschrieben von Michel Beheim. Preiser Records, Wien (CD 90206)
1997: Alt-Wiener Volkslieder I + II. ORF und Preiser Records, Wien (CD 90038, 90131)
1998: Das Nibelungenlied, Walther von der Vogelweide, Kürenberger. Extraplatte, Wien (nicht identisch mit der LP von 1984, sondern Neuaufnahme: CD, Stereo 93415)
1998: Es fuegt sich. Lieder des Oswald von Wolkenstein. Preiser Records, Wien (CD, Stereo 91051)
2004: Laurin – Epos und Schwank im mittelalterlichen Tirol. ORF, Wien (u.a. Ausschnitte aus dem Laurin-Epos, den Dietrich-Epen von der Virginal sowie dem Riesen Ecke, dem Willehalm Wolframs von Eschenbach, dem Iwein Hartmanns von Aue sowie zwei Schwankmären: Edition Alte Musik CD 363)
2004: Lieder zur Leier & Wissenswertes von Weihnachten. Gem. mit Helga Maria Wolf. Extraplatte, Wien (CD LC 8202)
2006: Nibelungenlied, Complete Recording. The Chaucer Studio, Provo, Utah/ États-Unis (zwei MP3-CDs )
2007: Die Lieder des Hugo von Montfort. ORF, Wien (Edition Alte Musik Zwei CDs + DVD, CD 3011)

=== Productions where he participated ===
1980: Lieder und Duette der Romantik. Interpret/innen: Guy-Kummer, Elisabeth (Alt). Kummer, Eberhard (Bass). Ortner, Roman (Klavier). LP, Wien : Preiser
1983: In adventu Domini : vorweihnachtl. Musik von 1200 bis 1600. Wien : Mirror Music
1986: Scholi singt. Lieder & Balladen des ausgejagten Studenten LP Lyraphon 580441, Seekirchen/Salzburg: Tonstudio "Die Mühle".
1990: Mozart, Tänze und Menuette. Wiener Akademie Martin Haselböck auf Originalinstrumenten. Novalis, Schweiz ??? (CD 150 059-1)
1993: Es ist ein schön Ding umb ein Rosen. Live-Mitschnitt der Uraufführung im Rahmen des Carinthischen Sommers in Villach. Carinthischer Sommer (CD 1111)
1994: Hans Sachs und seine Zeit. Clemencic Consort. Stradivarius dischi, Milano (Neuauflage 2010)
1997: Meilensteine der Volksmusik. Volkskultur Niederösterreich, Atzenbrugg. CD-Serie. Advent und Weihnachten in den Bergen. Verlag ??? München
1998: Der Staat ist in Gefahr! Lieder zur Wiener Revolution 1848. Wiener Volksliedwerk und Extraplatte, Wien (CD LC 8202)
1999: Das Narrenschiff - Mitschnitt der Aufführung des gleichnamigen Theaterstückes bei den Sommerspielen im Stift Altenburg. CD, Wien: Preiser: 1999
2000: Zu ebener Erde und erster Stock. Wiener Lieder und Tänze 1760-1860. "Die Eipeldauer". Extraplatte, Wien (CD EX 443-2)
2002: Mittelalterliche Lieder und Tänze. Paul Hofhaimer Consort Salzburg.Verlag der Bibliothek der Provinz, Weitra / Weinberg Records, Kefermarkt (CD SW 010173)
2004: Die geistliche Nachtigall. Weihnachts- und Hirtenmusik aus dem Alten Österreich. Clemencic-Consort Arte Nova Classics, München. (CDLC 3480)
2005: Hadamar von Laber - Jagd nach Liebe. CD, München: Oehms Classics, München. Clemencic-Consort (CD OC 519)
2009: Wir zogen gegen Napoleon. Musik der napoleonischen Epoche. (CD LC 16167)
