= Diocese of Budjala =

Roman Catholic diocese in the Democratic Republic of the Congo

Coordinates: 2.6494°N 19.7061°E

Diocese of Budjala Dioecesis Budialaensis

Location
- Country: Democratic Republic of Congo
- Metropolitan: Mbandaka-Bikoro

Statistics
- Area: 50,000 km^{2} (19,000 sq mi)
- Population: Total; Catholics: (as of 2006); 1,135,278; 562,335 (49.5%)

Information
- Rite: Latin Rite

Current leadership
- Pope: Leo XIV
- Bishop: Philibert Tembo Nlandu

The Roman Catholic Diocese of Budjala (Latin: Budialaën(sis)) is a diocese located in the city of Budjala in the ecclesiastical province of Mbandaka-Bikoro in the Democratic Republic of the Congo.

== History ==
- 25 November 1964: Established as Diocese of Budjala from the Diocese of Lisala

== Bishops ==
- Bishops of Budjala (Latin Rite), in reverse chronological order
  - Bishop Philibert Tembo Nlandu (since 22 October 2009)
  - Bishop Joseph Bolangi Egwanga Ediba Tasame (24 January 1974 - 2009)
  - Bishop François van den Berghe, C.I.C.M. (25 November 1964 – 1974)

=== Coadjutor bishop ===
- Philibert Tembo Nlandu, C.I.C.M. (2007-2009)

== See also ==
- Roman Catholicism in the Democratic Republic of the Congo

== Sources ==
- GCatholic.org
- Catholic Hierarchy
