= Terry Hodgkinson =

British businessman (1949–2019)

Terry Hodgkinson CBE DL (30 March 1949 – 13 July 2019) was Chairman of Yorkshire Forward, the Regional Development Agency for Yorkshire and the Humber. He was appointed on 14 December 2003 and stepped down in December 2010.

He held an Honours Degree in Building from the University of Aston, in Birmingham, a Chartered Director, a Fellow of the Institute of Directors IOD and of the Chartered Institute of Building CIOB. He was awarded an honorary doctorate at the University of Huddersfield in 2010 and a CBE for services to business and regeneration in 2010 and was a visiting professor affiliated to the Faculty of Business and Law at Leeds Metropolitan University.

== Career ==
In 1973, Hodgkinson founded Aston Builders and Contractors Ltd in Wakefield which ran up to 1979. He then formed with a partner a company called Lemmeleg Ltd and ran this until 2005 with a turnover of £30 million then sold out to Rok. During this period he also ran and sold on a number of SME's from an equipment hire company, a reconstituted stone company, a professional services business and a house building company. He went on to establish a company specializing in historic building reuse which still runs today as Magna Holdings Ltd and Magna Yorkshire Investments Ltd. In 2001, he was appointed as a member of the Heritage Lottery Committee for Yorkshire making awards of up to £2 million and advising on large awards for Wentworth Castle in Barnsley, The Royal Hall in Harrogate and Leeds City Museum. In 2002 he was asked to lead the panel of international architects and urbanists for the Renaissance Initiative for Yorkshire Forward. From 2003 he led Yorkshire Forward, the regional development agency for Yorkshire and Humber. As Chair he oversaw the agency grow the economy of the region and was responsible for £360 million.

== Awards and recognition ==
Hodgkinson had an Honours Degree in Building from the University of Aston in Birmingham. He was a Chartered Director and a Fellow of the Institute of Directors IOD and an Ambassador and Fellow for the Chartered Institute of Building. He was awarded an honorary doctorate at the University of Huddersfield, a CBE for services to business and regeneration and held the position of Deputy Lieutenant for West Yorkshire and a visiting professor at Leeds Metropolitan University affiliated to the Faculty of Business and Law.

== Projects ==
In 2010, Hodgkinson set up The Alchemists Foundation which is a community interest company with beneficiaries being 16- to 19-year-olds to inspire and help them develop themselves. In March 2011 he launched his first book Beyond Expectation and his new personal brand titled Inspiration for Industry, Education and Regeneration to target non-executive Chair opportunities, industry and professional conference chair, ambassadorial roles and speaking engagements.
