= Munshi Mohammad Fazle Kader =

- Born: 1928/29
- Died: 4 July 2019
- Other names: Kader Mia

Munshi Mohammad Fazle Kader was an Indian citizen who was awarded Friends of Liberation War Honour for his contribution to the Liberation War of Bangladesh.

== Biography ==
Munshi Mohammad Fazle Kader was appointed a fourth class employee of Assistant High Commission of Pakistan in Kolkata on 24 April 1953. After starting Liberation War of Bangladesh the Flag of Bangladesh had been hoisted by Assistant High Commissioner of Bangladesh to Bangladesh Assistant High Commission of Kolkata M Hossain Ali in Assistant in Bangladesh Assistant High Commission of Kolkata on 18 April 1971. It was the first incident of hoisting Flag of Bangladesh in a foreign country. Munshi Mohammad Fazle Kader was with him at the time of hoisting.

He did not get his salary regularly at the time of Liberation War of Bangladesh but, he did not quit his job at that time. He retired from the job on 24 April 2003 but, he was appointed for three more years on agreement appointment. He received Friends of Liberation War Honour on 24 March 2012 from Bangladeshi Prime Minister Sheikh Hasina for his contribution to the Liberation War of Bangladesh.

Munshi Mohammad Fazle Kader died on 4 July 2019 at the age of 90 in his village Ketupur which is situated in Purba Bardhaman district of West Bengal.
