= Petra Fuhrmann =

German politician (1955–2019)

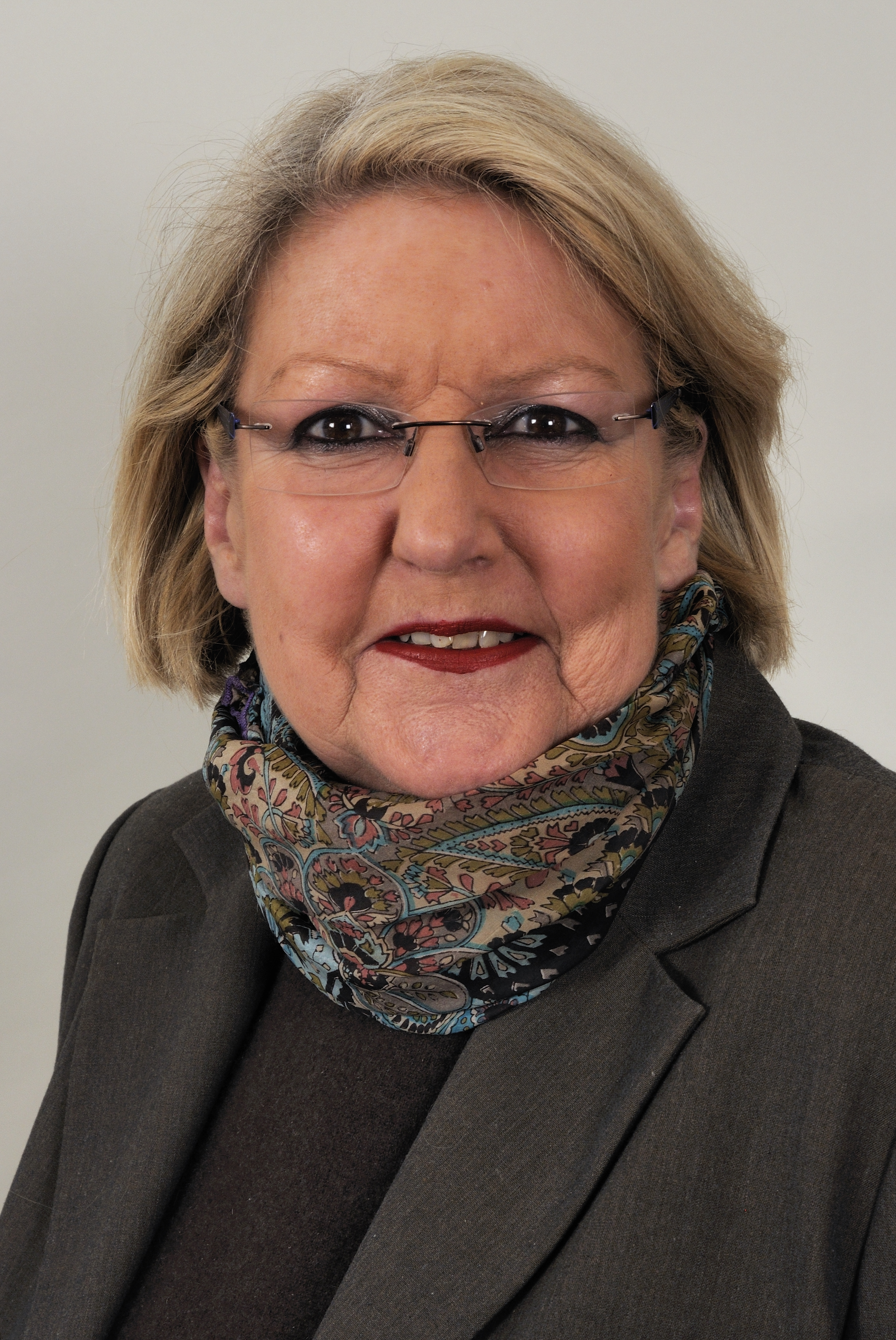
Fuhrmann in 2013

Petra Fuhrmann (19 October 1955 – 22 July 2019) was a German politician who was a member of the Landtag of Hesse for 20 years.

== Life ==
Fuhrmann was born in 1955 in Wiesbaden. She studied political science and chemistry at TU Darmstadt, graduating in 1982. A short time later she joined the Social Democratic Party of Germany (SPD).

Fuhrmann first became a member of the Hessian Landtag in 1994. From 1997 she was the spokesperson on social issues for the SPD parliamentary group, and also deputy chairperson of the parliamentary group until 2003. She remained a member of the Landtag until 2014.

She also sat on the district council of the Hochtaunuskreis from 2001 and was part of the advisory council of the Hessenpark.

After the 2008 Hessian state election Fuhrmann was slated to become the Hessian Minister for Social Affairs, but Andrea Ypsilanti failed to secure a majority to form a government. She was considered for the same position by Gerhard Bökel ahead of the 2003 election.

Fuhrmann was 63 years old when she died in July 2019. She lived in Friedrichsdorf.
