= Patrícia Araújo =

Brazilian pornographic actress

- Born: 11 March 1982; Rio de Janeiro, Brazil
- Died: 6 July 2019 (aged 37); Brazil
- Other names: Patrícia Oliveira; Patrícia Chantily
- Height: 1.80 m (5 ft 11 in)

Patrícia Araújo (also known as Pata Oliveira; 11 March 1982 – 4 July 2019) was a Brazilian actress and model. Araújo was also a former pornographic actress.

== Biography ==
Araújo was born into a middle-class family in Governador Island (Rio de Janeiro), Brazil. At 12, Araújo kissed a male classmate prior to her transition inside the public school where she studied. This event generated rumors that came to the school board's attention, and Araújo was persecuted by the supervisor. Thinking that the employee's intention was only to help her, Araújo confessed she was gay. As a result, she was expelled from school in 1997 while in seventh grade.

After the incident, Araújo confessed to her parents, Severino Araújo and stay-at-home Terezinha Araújo, both evangelicals, that she saw herself as a woman, not a man, and was attracted to males. Her older brother, whose name she never disclosed, wanted her to be expelled from the house because of it, but her parents supported her.

Araújo began to dress as a woman, and guided by a transvestite who lived near her home, began taking hormonal control pills to become more feminized. At 15 years of age, she married a man twenty years older and lived in São Paulo. The relationship lasted four years and soon after it ended, Araújo returned to Rio de Janeiro to find work and complete high school. She could not find work and subsequently went into prostitution, first in Brazil and later in Italy, using the name Patricia Chantily. In 2009, she was mentioned on newspapers for being invited by football player Adriano to a private party in his home, allegedly with other prostitutes.

In 2009 Araújo was featured in Rio Fashion Week. She has also worked as an actress in the miniseries A Lei e o Crime and the telenovela Luz do Sol, both on the Brazilian television network Rede Record. In April 2009 she posed along with the model Pamela Sanches, for the magazine A Gata da Hora.

When Patricia was performing in erotic films, she was known for not showing her breasts because her nipples were "crossed" or wall eyed. She had surgery to correct this problem.

Legally, her name was Patrícia Oliveira.

She died on 4 July 2019 after suffering from serious mental health problems (suicide by overdose).

== Awards ==
- Miss Brazil Transsex 2002
- Miss T-girl World 2004
- Miss Universo Trans 2005

== Partial filmography ==
- Rogue Adventures 5 (1999)
- Shemale Yum Takes on Brazilian Transsexuals 3 (2002)
- Gia Darling's Shemale Slumber Party (2003)
- Big-Ass She-Male All-Stars (2003)
- She-Male Slumber Party (2003)
- Trans X 2 (2003)
