= Derrill Osborn =

American fashion executive (1942–2019)

Derrill Radcliff Osborn (July 22, 1942 – July 1, 2019) was an American fashion executive.

Osborn graduated from Abilene High School and attended Abilene Christian College. He served in the U.S. Army. In 1964, then started working at Saks Fifth Avenue in New York City. He stayed for ten years, working his way up from a sales person to a buyer. Osborn briefly ran a men's clothing and antiques boutique in Beverly Hills, California before joining Neiman Marcus where he also worked as a buyer for six years before being appointed vice-president of men's tailored clothing. In 2002, Osborn retired from his position at Neiman Marcus.

Osborn helped introduce Italian menswear lines such as Zegna, Brioni, and Kiton to the American market in the 1980s. He also promoted a return to three button suits for men. On questions of fashion, Osborn was often sought out by reporters to comment for articles in The New York Times, The Wall Street Journal, and other publications.

In addition to influencing fashion through his position, Osborn was known for his eccentric personal style, identified by his mustache, wearing of wide-brimmed hats, and boutonnieres. Osborn was featured in magazines such as GQ, Vogue Hommes, and Esquire.

Osborne died at his home in Dallas on July 1, 2019, aged 76.
