= Motto McLean =

Canadian ice hockey player (1925–2019)

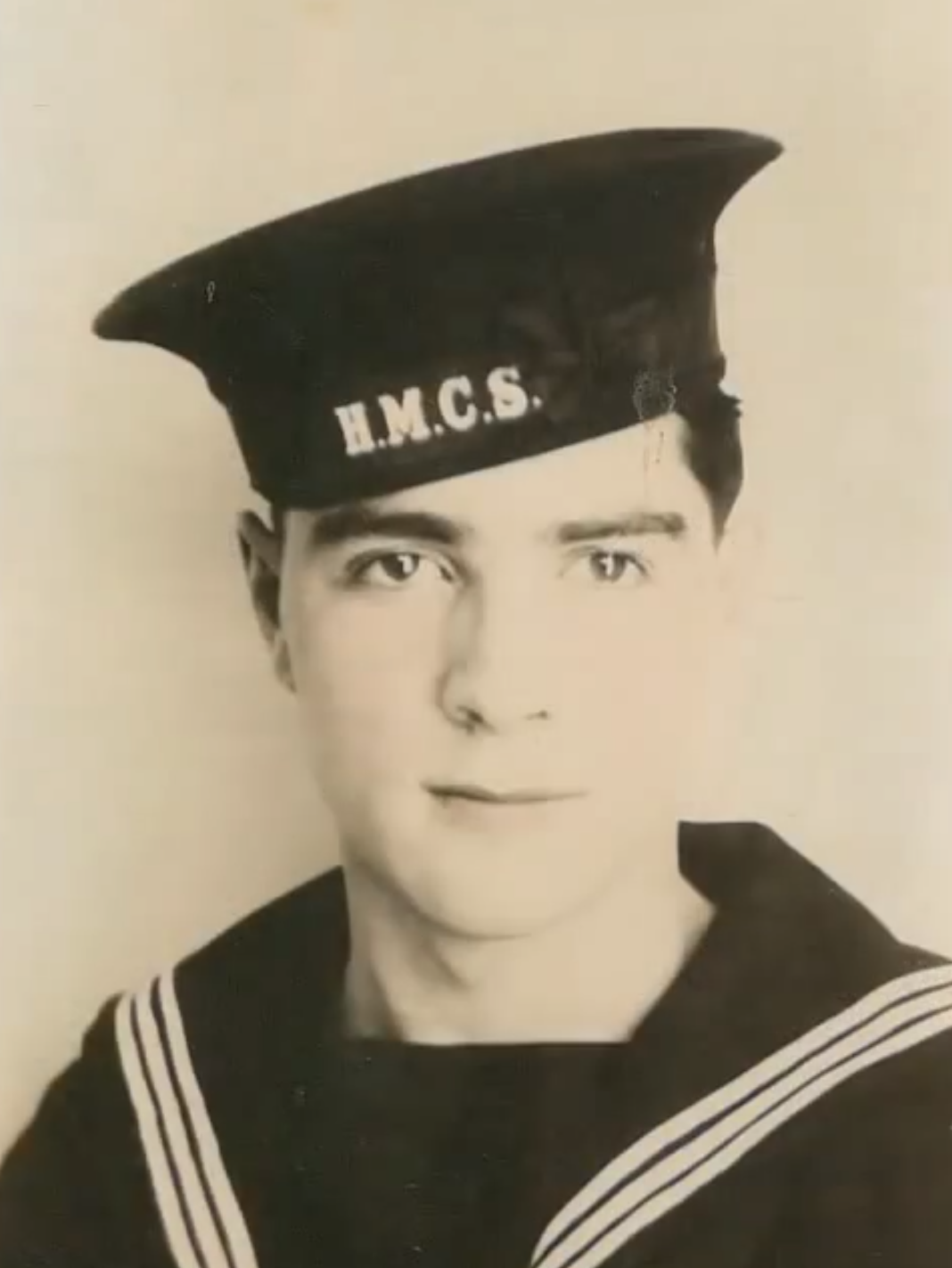
- McLean in the 1940s
- Born: December 26, 1925; Dalmeny, Scotland
- Died: July 10, 2019 (aged 93); Omaha, Nebraska, U.S.
- Height: 5 ft 8 in (173 cm)
- Weight: 154 lb (70 kg; 11 st 0 lb)
- Position: Right wing
- Shot: Right
- Played for: Omaha Knights; Fort Worth Rangers; St. Louis Flyers; New Westminster Royals; Vancouver Canucks
- Playing career: 1946–1961

Emmanuel Hall Roberts "Motto" McLean (December 26, 1925 – July 10, 2019) was a Canadian professional hockey player who played for the Omaha Knights and Fort Worth Rangers in the United States Hockey League. He also played for the St. Louis Flyers in the American Hockey League, along with the New Westminster Royals and Vancouver Canucks in the Western Hockey League. Born in Scotland, McLean was raised in Flin Flon, Manitoba. Known as "Mr. Hockey" where he resided, in Omaha, Nebraska, an arena there is named in his honour. He received the Wm. Thayer Tutt Award from USA Hockey in 2002.

His nickname "Motto" was derived from an apparent childhood resemblance to Mr. Moto, as portrayed by Peter Lorre.
