= Diana Henderson =

Solicitor, military historian and officer (1946–2019)

Major Diana Mary Henderson (1946–2019) was a solicitor, historian and officer in the Women's Royal Army Corps. She later worked as the director of development at Hopetoun House and Queens' College, Cambridge. Her interests included boxing, horse-riding and playing the bagpipes.
