= Jan Mokkenstorm =

Dutch psychiatrist (1962–2019)

Jan Mokkenstorm was a Dutch psychiatrist. In 2009 he created 113, a Dutch telephone suicide prevention service. The service is used about 200 times every day. He studied medicine in Maastricht and later got his education in psychiatry and psychotherapy at Amsterdam. He was director of 113 and acting physician-director of GGZingeest where he also dealt with suicide prevention and patient safety. He was an honorary member of the Dutch Association for Psychiatry (Dutch: Nederlandse Vereniging voor Psychiatrie). He tried to lift the taboo around talking about suicide and suicidal thoughts. Vrij Nederland declared his contribution to suicide prevention in the Netherlands “radical” reforms, he was also awarded the Ven award and in 2018 he was knighted. He died on 8 July 2019 aged 57.
