= David L. Ferguson =

American mathematician and educator

- Born: August 19, 1949; Pascola, Missouri
- Died: July 12, 2019 (aged 69); Port Jefferson, New York
- Education: University of California, Berkeley
- Scientific career
- Fields: STEM education
- Workplaces: Stony Brook University

David Ferguson (1949–2019) was a Distinguished Service Professor and Provost's Scholar at Stony Brook University.

He joined Stony Brook University in 1981, becoming the first African-American assistant professor there.

From 1998 to 2002, Ferguson served as the founding director of Stony Brook's Center for Excellence in Learning and Teaching. From 2002 to 2017, he served as the chair of Department of Technology and Society, College of Engineering and Applied Sciences.

For his contribution to STEM education, he received the U.S. Presidential Award for Excellence in Science, Mathematics, and Engineering Mentoring, jointly administered by the White House and NSF, in 1997.
