= Bill Schulz (editor) =

American journalist and editor (1939–2019)

- Born: William Martin Schulz; January 12, 1939; New York City, U.S.
- Died: July 22, 2019 (aged 80); Washington, D.C., U.S
- Education: Bronx High School of Science; Antioch College (did not graduate)
- Occupations: Journalist, editor
- Spouse: Lynne Canwell
- Children: 4

William Martin Schulz (January 12, 1939 – July 22, 2019) was an American conservative journalist and editor. He was an editor of Reader's Digest from 1967 to 2003, and he wrote many articles for Human Events.

== Early life ==
Schulz was born on January 12, 1939, in New York City. He graduated from the Bronx High School of Science and he attended Antioch College for a year but failed to graduate.

== Career ==
Schulz edited Reader's Digest from 1967 to 2003, initially as the senior editor of its Washington bureau and later as executive editor. During those years, he made sure the magazine kept its anti-communist stance.

== Personal life and death ==
Schulz married Lynne Canwell. They had four sons: William, Max, Nick, and Ken.

Schulz died on July 22, 2019, in Washington, D.C., at age 80.
