= Valerik Apinian =

Armenian and Russian artist (1950–2019)

Apinian Valerik
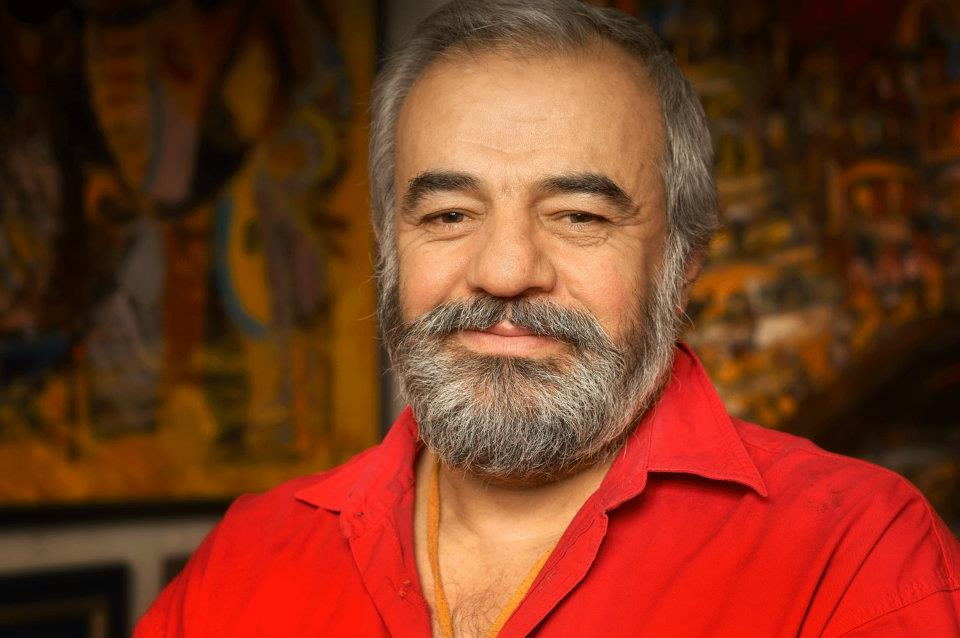
- Born: 4 April 1950; Maysan, Gumri, Armenia
- Died: 28 July 2019 (aged 69)

Valerik Apinian (4 April 1950 - 28 July 2019) was an Armenian and Russian artist.

== Biography ==
Valerik Apinyan was born on April 4, 1950, in the village of Mayisyan (Armenia). He graduated from school in 1967. He studied at Leninakan Art College, Leningrad Higher School of Industrial Art, Mukhina from 1973 to 1976. He was a free listener at the Institute of Painting, Sculpture and Architecture. IE Repin (Academy of Arts). He was a member of the Russian Artists' Union since 1976. He had more than 20 personal exhibitions, participated in over 200 exhibitions in Russia and the world. For a long time he lived and worked in Germany and Sweden. The main collection of works was painted in oil, as well as many works with tempera. He worked with graphics, painted the theater curtains for theaters, for example, at the Mariinsky theater. Workshops are located in St. Petersburg near Mariinsky theater, and in the Armenian city of Gyumri.

== Personal life ==
Valerik was born into a family of school teachers in the city of Leninakan. He was married to Tamara Krivko-Apinian*http://ru.hayazg.info/Апинян_Тамара_Антоновна, Professor of Philosophy and art history and the author of books on the philosophy and history of music. Valerik and Tamara had two sons. He lived in St. Petersburg.

== Collections ==
His works are collected by

- The State Russian Museum, St. Petersburg
- The National Museum of Armenia, Yerevan
- The Museum of modern art Armenia, Yerevan
- In private Museum collections
- Frank Reiche Munich
- Tamara Oloffson, Sweden
- Rönesans Holding Erman Ilicak, Turkey
- More than 350 works of oil are located in private collections in Russia, USA and Europe

== Personal exhibition ==
- 11.05.2015.300 s Armenian community. Gallery at the Armenian Church of St. Petersburg
- 04.04.2011. Museum of Modern Art Armeni. Erevan
- 30.10.2006. Galerie Venome Paris France
- 12.04.2001. Freiraume Berlin, Germany
- 25.10.2001.main(central) exhibition hall Manege St. Petersburg
- 18.11.1997. Stockholm Galerie Stockholm Sweden
- 06.10.1996. Galerie Annachrista Kroll Düsseldorf Germany
- 07.12.1996. Galerie Von Der-Leage Aachen Germany
- 25.11.1994. Aachen Germany Municipality
- 16.11.1994. Cologne Germany Municipality
- 17.06.1994. Galerie Am Aubach Berlin, Germany
- 05.12.1991. Exhibition Center of the St. Petersburg Union of Artists
- 17.12.1991. Tamara Oloffson galerie and kulturnamnden Pitea, Sweden
- 14.12.1990. Wolgang Tumulka Galerie Munich
- 09.12.1990. Galerie Von Der-Leage Aachen Germany
