= Yelena Grigoryeva =

Russian LGBT rights activist

- Died: July 21, 2019; Saint Petersburg, Russia
- Occupations: Human rights and LGBTQ rights activist
- Known for: Opposing the annexation of Crimea by the Russian Federation

Yelena 'Lena' Grigoryeva (1978 – July 21, 2019) was a human rights and LGBTQ rights activist. She also opposed the annexation of Crimea by the Russian Federation. She was murdered in St. Petersburg, Russia on 21 July 2019, when she was stabbed and strangled to death by unknown assailants, her body being found by a passer-by near her home. Grigoryeva's identifying information had appeared in July on a website created by a group calling themselves ‘Saw’ after the American horror film franchise. The group encouraged readers to hunt and murder a list of LGBTQ+ people. Saw's website was blocked in Russia but a new list of LGBTQ+ activists, journalists and citizens is circulating on social media apps and messaging apps in the country, still encouraging others to murder LGBTQ+ people in Russia.

Grigoryeva had protested publicly in support of the Khachaturian sisters not long before her death. She also participated in anti-war and pro-democracy demonstrations, and had protested for the release of Crimean Tatars living in occupied Crimea in Ukraine accused of terrorism, against Russia's military activities in Ukraine, and against domestic violence.

== Death threats ==
Grigoryeva had received numerous online and offline death threats in the week before her death, intensifying after her name was listed on the Saw-inspired website Пила. Authorities quickly dismissed the allegations of a hate crime, describing Grigoryeva as an alcoholic with an "antisocial lifestyle" and ascribing her death to a drunken dispute with an acquaintance, 28-year-old Aleksei Volnyanko, who confessed on August 2, two days after his arrest.

However, lawyers on the case, fellow LGBT activists, and friends of Grigoryeva expressed doubt, having never heard of Volnyanko and suspecting him to be a scapegoat. They suspected a political killing, as Grigoryeva had fiercely criticized President Vladimir Putin, and her name had been published by Saw days before her murder. Saw, which had emerged in Ufa in April 2018, had previously announced online a game called Saw: A Hunt for Gays in Ufa. A number of attacks against LGBT activists in Bashkortostan followed. They then created a website calling for a nationwide campaign against homosexuals, which published names, addresses, and contact details of alleged homosexuals across Russia and demanded payment in digital currency as ransom for those to be captured. Though the website was blocked in the spring 2019, a successor named 19 people, including Grigoryeva, who commented on Facebook about her own inclusion.

LGBT activists unsuccessfully appealed Russian law enforcement authorities to investigate Saw. Like investigators, state media dismissed Saw as a stunt by LGBT activists seeking asylum abroad while describing Grigoryeva as an alcoholic. The LGBT community is often portrayed by officials and state media as a product of western decadence and a dangerous cult. (See LGBT rights in Russia.) Notably, Russia criminalized "gay propaganda" in 2013.

In the meantime Saw, or imitators, continued to operate privately. Threats have continued via email, such as to Vitaly Bespalov, editor of an LGBT-friendly website and a friend of Grigoryeva.
