= Juan Carlos Márquez =

Executive director of the oil company PDVSA

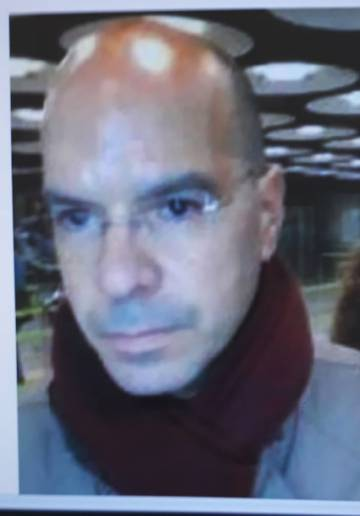
- Born: Juan Carlos Márquez Cabrera; 1971; Spain
- Died: 21 July 2019 (aged 48); Madrid, Spain

Juan Carlos Márquez Cabrera (Spanish: [ˈxwaŋ ˈkaɾlos ˈmaɾkeθ kaˈβɾeɾa], 1971 – 21 July 2019) was an executive director of the Venezuelan state-run oil company PDVSA. He was involved in investigations of the Morodo Case in Spain in 2019, before mysteriously dying.

== Career ==
Márquez was a director of PDVSA between 2004 and 2013 and head of its legal department. He then became a teacher at the Central University of Venezuela, as well as had started various businesses in Spain since 2016.

== Morodo Case ==
Márquez was a former executive director of PDVSA during the Chávez government but was also believed to be the figurehead signatory of contracts between PDVSA and other companies believed to be the cover for money laundering. These contracts were signed between 2008 and 2012. One of the high-profile individuals also believed to have signed contracts is Alejo Morodo. Alejo Morodo is the son of the former Spanish Ambassador to Venezuela, Raúl Morodo, and one party implicated in a scheme to launder Venezuelan state assets to various individuals, including Morodo and Márquez, through false international advisory contracts charged for a company he represented.

He had previously been cited by the Venezuelan National Assembly over missing assets in 2016. An arrest warrant was issued for him on 20 May 2019. Friends suggest that Márquez was not politically aligned, serving at PDVSA only as a qualified manager.

== Death ==
Márquez flew to Spain after he had been contacted by Spain's UDEF, the monetary investigative branch of the National Police Corps, and the Morodo Case had already begun in Spain, knowing he would be arrested upon arrival. He told the Spanish prosecutor that he had lots of valuable information and would cooperate, appearing in court on Friday 19 July to confirm he had signed contracts of interest. He was not arraigned before leaving for the weekend, going to work in an office building in Madrid with a friend.

On Saturday 20 July, Interpol in Washington, D.C. alerted Spain to Márquez's name on a passenger manifest for an Iberia flight from Spain due to land in Chicago, in the United States, which they would intercept and deport Márquez back on the same plane. However, though a seat was booked in Márquez's name, he was not on the flight and had never left the office. It is suggested that somebody else booked the flight with his name.

Márquez and a business partner, Carlos Prada had arranged to meet on Sunday 21 July; Márquez did not appear and, thus, Prada went to look for him. When trying to reach Márquez in his office, Prada found the locked door suspicious. He called the emergency services, who broke down the door and found Márquez hanged.

Though appearing to look like suicide, there is suspicion over his cause of death, as he was willingly giving evidence in the court case. The Spanish authorities report that his body was not only hanged but had blood stains on his chest and head. Other sources have reported that he was found in his apartment or a shed, including the BBC. Venezuelan military sources have said that Márquez did not kill himself, but was murdered. In August 2019, a Spanish journalist compared his mysterious hanging to the Death of Jeffrey Epstein.

El País reported that no suicide note was found and that Márquez showed no sign of wanting to kill himself; El Pitazo also reports that he did not fit the profile of somebody to suddenly kill themselves; Miami Diario also reiterates this view, though it does mention a note found near to his body that was handwritten but unconfirmed to be in Márquez's handwriting.

Investigations have begun to determine a means of death.
