= Terry Isaac =

American artist (1958–2019)

Terry Isaac (September 24, 1958 – July 16, 2019) was an American painter from Salem, Oregon who was known for his realism paintings of wildlife. In 2007, he moved to Canada.

His work has been exhibited at the Leigh Yawkey Woodson Art Museum and the Saint George Art Museum. In 1998, he was named "Artist of the Year" Florida Wildlife Expo and Pacific Rim Wildlife Art Show. In 1999 he was named Friend of the National Zoo "Artist of the Year" and was named Special Guest Artist at the Southeastern Wildlife Expo in 2000. He was commissioned to create 14 renderings for the Audubon Bird Handbook, and was the author of Painting the Drama of Wildlife Step by Step. His work is included in the books Painting Birds Step by Step, The Best of Wildlife Art, and More Wildlife Painting Techniques of Modern Masters.

Isaac was hired as a visual consultant to create the concept art for the main character in the Disney movie Dinosaur because the producer's wanted characters rendered in a realistic way.

== Life and career ==
Terry Isaac grew up in the Willamette Valley of Oregon, and it is there that he began working with wildlife. Drawing inspiration from his own backyard and from the captivating vistas of the Northwest, he began to create dramatic wildlife art. He later called Penticton, British Columbia, Canada home. Since moving, he continued to create paintings capturing unique characteristics of wildlife and their habitats. Terry travelled around the world to capture images, but his main painting focus continued to be on North American birds and mammals. Isaac painted predominantly in acrylics and particularly admired the art of the nineteenth century painters Thomas Moran and Albert Bierstadt, who painted the dramatic light and landscapes of the west.

Terry's formal art began with an interest in animation and drawing cartoons, with an intent on working for Disney. After art college, he was interested in children's book illustration but soon re-discovered his childhood passion for wildlife. Since the mid 1980s, he created realistic wildlife art with a focus on particularity and dramatic light. He incorporated large panoramas as well as close-up views, with subjects ranging from whales to hummingbirds.

During his professional career as an artist Terry Isaac was placed in 12 stamp and print competitions, been commissioned to create for the Audubon Society handbooks and hired to develop the main character, Aladar, in a Walt Disney production. His works are housed in prominent permanent collections such as Leigh Yawkey Woodson Art Museum, Bennington Center For The Arts, American Airlines, First National Bank of South Africa and in many private and corporate collections around the world. His paintings have appeared for sale and re-sale at Christies Auction House, London, England.

Isaac participated in several important art competitions, including the Society of Animal Artists and the Artists for Conservation annual exhibitions and Leigh Yawkey Woodson Art Museum's prestigious Birds in Art exhibition, in which his art will have been featured 14 times. Besides painting, Isaac was a casual singer-songwriter of folk rock and soft rock music. It was his dream to have a song written by him on the radio.

Isaac was also a teacher and his approach to painting was outlined in his own book Painting the Drama of Wildlife, Step by Step now in its second edition. The book's success led to the creation of a DVD, Painting Wildlife in Acrylic as well as featured in several other books. Terry taught annual workshops, with students attending from all over the world.

Demand for Terry's originals has remained high, partly due to the fact that his technique of painting and the detail which he captured meant that he painted relatively few paintings per year. Terry's work was published by Mill Pond Press for almost 20 years, and many of his limited edition prints are sold out. Terry was a self-published artist, who strove to create works of art for collectors and only printed a select number of his paintings with very small edition sizes.

Terry Isaac held his own gallery and framing shop among the vineyards and orchards on the South Okanagan's "Naramata Bench". There he gave workshops on painting techniques throughout the year. Although Isaac received a formal art education, graduating with honours, he believed his best training came from being outdoors and from studying the work of his favourite wildlife artists.

Isaac was married to Connie Toland from 1980 to 2003; they had one daughter together. Later at a workshop in Canada, he met and married Kathleen Jagger. He had two sons and a stepson with Kathleen.

Isaac died unexpectedly from a heart attack in Penticton in 2019. He was sixty years old.
