= Richard M. Thorne =

American physicist and professor (1942–2019)

- Born: Richard Mansergh Thorne; July 25, 1942
- Died: July 12, 2019 (aged 76)
- Education: Birmingham University (BS)
- Occupations: physicist, professor
- Known for: contributions to space plasma physics
- Notable work: see Selected publications
- Awards: fellow, American Geophysical Union

Richard Mansergh Thorne (July 25, 1942 – July 12, 2019) was an American physicist and a distinguished professor in the department of atmospheric and oceanic sciences at UCLA. He was known for his contributions to space plasma physics. He was a fellow of the American Geophysical Union.

Thorne graduated from Birmingham University in 1963 with a BS in mathematical physics. In 1968 he received a PhD in physics from MIT. The astronomer Alar Toomre was his advisor; his thesis was titled On the distribution of interstellar gas in the galaxy.

In 1968 Thorne joined the department of meteorology at UCLA (now the department of atmospheric and oceanic sciences). In 2000 he was appointed distinguished professor and elected a fellow of the American Geophysical Union. He retired in 2015.

== Selected publications ==
- Cornwall, John M.; Coroniti, F. V.; Thorne, R. M. (1970). "Turbulent loss of ring current protons". Journal of Geophysical Research. 75 (25): 4699–4709. Bibcode:1970JGR....75.4699C. doi:10.1029/JA075i025p04699. ISSN 0148-0227.
- Lyons, Lawrence R.; Thorne, Richard Mansergh; Kennel, Charles F. (1972). "Pitch-angle diffusion of radiation belt electrons within the plasmasphere". Journal of Geophysical Research. 77 (19): 3455–3474. Bibcode:1972JGR....77.3455L. doi:10.1029/JA077i019p03455. ISSN 0148-0227.
- Thorne, Richard M.; Smith, Edward J.; Burton, Rande K.; Holzer, Robert E. (1973). "Plasmaspheric hiss". Journal of Geophysical Research. 78 (10): 1581–1596. Bibcode:1973JGR....78.1581T. doi:10.1029/JA078i010p01581. ISSN 0148-0227.
- Lyons, Lawrence R.; Thorne, Richard Mansergh (1973). "Equilibrium structure of radiation belt electrons". Journal of Geophysical Research. 78 (13): 2142–2149. Bibcode:1973JGR....78.2142L. doi:10.1029/JA078i013p02142. ISSN 0148-0227.
- Summers, Danny; Thorne, Richard M. (1991). "The modified plasma dispersion function". Physics of Fluids B: Plasma Physics. 3 (8): 1835–1847. Bibcode:1991PhFlB...3.1835S. doi:10.1063/1.859653. ISSN 0899-8221.
- Summers, Danny; Thorne, Richard M.; Xiao, Fuliang (1998). "Relativistic theory of wave-particle resonant diffusion with application to electron acceleration in the magnetosphere". Journal of Geophysical Research: Space Physics. 103 (A9): 20487–20500. Bibcode:1998JGR...10320487S. doi:10.1029/98JA01740. ISSN 0148-0227.
- Horne, Richard B.; Thorne, Richard M. (1998). "Potential waves for relativistic electron scattering and stochastic acceleration during magnetic storms". Geophysical Research Letters. 25 (15): 3011–3014. Bibcode:1998GeoRL..25.3011H. doi:10.1029/98GL01002. ISSN 0094-8276. S2CID 120434760.
- Abel, Bob; Thorne, Richard M. (1998). "Electron scattering loss in Earth's inner magnetosphere: 1. Dominant physical processes". Journal of Geophysical Research: Space Physics. 103 (A2): 2385–2396. Bibcode:1998JGR...103.2385A. doi:10.1029/97JA02919. ISSN 0148-0227.
- Daglis, Ioannis A.; Thorne, Richard M.; Baumjohann, Wolfgang; Orsini, Stefano (1999). "The terrestrial ring current: Origin, formation, and decay". Reviews of Geophysics. 37 (4): 407–438. Bibcode:1999RvGeo..37..407D. doi:10.1029/1999RG900009. ISSN 8755-1209. S2CID 17693120.
- Summers, Danny (2003). "Relativistic electron pitch-angle scattering by electromagnetic ion cyclotron waves during geomagnetic storms" (PDF). Journal of Geophysical Research. 108 (A4): 1143. Bibcode:2003JGRA..108.1143S. doi:10.1029/2002JA009489. ISSN 0148-0227.
- Horne, Richard B. (2005). "Timescale for radiation belt electron acceleration by whistler mode chorus waves". Journal of Geophysical Research. 110 (A3): A03225. Bibcode:2005JGRA..110.3225H. doi:10.1029/2004JA010811. ISSN 0148-0227.
- Horne, Richard B.; Thorne, Richard M.; Shprits, Yuri Y.; Meredith, Nigel P.; Glauert, Sarah A.; Smith, Andy J.; Kanekal, Shrikanth G.; Baker, Daniel N.; Engebretson, Mark J.; Posch, Jennifer L.; Spasojevic, Maria; Inan, Umran S.; Pickett, Jolene S.; Decreau, Pierrette M. E. (2005). "Wave acceleration of electrons in the Van Allen radiationbelts". Nature. 437 (7056): 227–230. Bibcode:2005Natur.437..227H. doi:10.1038/nature03939. ISSN 0028-0836. PMID 16148927. S2CID 1530882.
- Thorne, Richard Mansergh (2010). "Radiation belt dynamics: The importance of wave-particle interactions". Geophysical Research Letters. 37 (22): n/a. Bibcode:2010GeoRL..3722107T. doi:10.1029/2010GL044990. ISSN 0094-8276. S2CID 117777812.
