= Bartolo Pellegrino =

Italian politician (1934–2019)

Bartolo Pellegrino (26 October 1934 – 28 July 2019) was an Italian politician who served as a Sicilian Regional Deputy. He was part of the 7th Legislature and 11th Legislature.
