= Joseph Bolangi Egwanga Ediba Tasame =

Democratic Republic of the Congo Roman Catholic bishop (1937–2019)

Joseph Bolangi Egwanga Ediba Tasame (29 December 1937 – 1 July 2019) was a Democratic Republic of the Congo Roman Catholic bishop.

Bolangi Egwanga Ediba Tasame was born in the Democratic Republic of the Congo and was ordained to the priesthood in 1966. He served as bishop of the Roman Catholic Diocese of Budjala from 1974 until 2009.
