= Pavel Kučera (lawyer) =

Czech lawyer and judge (1940–2019)

Pavel Kučera (11 February 1940 – 23 July 2019) was a Czech lawyer and judge who served as vice president of the Supreme Court of the Czech Republic.
