= Mohan Das (politician) =

Indian politician (died 2019)

Assam Legislative Assembly
- In office 1996–2001
- Preceded by: Krishna Kanta Lahkar
- Succeeded by: Pabindra Deka
- Constituency: Patacharkuchi

Personal details
- Died: 5 July 2019
- Party: Asom Gana Parishad

Mohan Das was an Indian politician belonging to Asom Gana Parishad. He was elected to the Assam Legislative Assembly from Patacharkuchi in the 1996 election. He died on 5 July 2019.
