= Deaths in February 2019 =

The following is a list of notable deaths in February 2019.

Entries for each day are listed alphabetically by surname. A typical entry lists information in the following sequence:

- Name, age, country of citizenship at birth, subsequent country of citizenship (if applicable), reason for notability, cause of death (if known), and reference.

== February 2019 ==
=== 1 ===
- Kinryū Arimoto, 78, Japanese voice actor (City Hunter, Gasaraki, One Piece), esophageal cancer.
- Conway Berners-Lee, 97, English mathematician and computer scientist.
- D. J. Conway, 79, American occult writer.
- John J. Duffy Jr., 85, American criminal defense attorney.
- Alice Dye, 91, American amateur golfer and golf course designer (TPC at Sawgrass).
- Tim Elkington, 98, British Royal Air Force fighter pilot, member of The Few, fall.
- Jeremy Hardy, 57, English comedian, radio host and panelist (The News Quiz, I'm Sorry I Haven't a Clue, Jeremy Hardy Speaks to the Nation), cancer.
- Glen Ray Hines, 75, American football player (Arkansas Razorbacks, Houston Oilers, New Orleans Saints).
- Ursula Karusseit, 79, German actress (Ways across the Country, KLK Calling PTZ – The Red Orchestra).
- Andrew McGahan, 52, Australian author (Praise, The White Earth, Wonders of a Godless World), pancreatic cancer.
- Ayub Ogada, 63, Kenyan musician.
- Edit Perényi-Weckinger, 95, Hungarian gymnast, Olympic silver medalist (1948, 1952).
- Mel Pickings, 92, Canadian politician, member of the Nova Scotia House of Assembly (1978–1988).
- Ehsan-ul-Haq Piracha, Pakistani politician, Minister of Finance (1988–1990).
- Raymond Ratzlaff, 87, Canadian politician.
- Lisa Seagram, 82, American actress (A House Is Not a Home, Caprice, The Beverly Hillbillies), dementia.
- Rex Sorensen, 73, American media executive.
- Yosef Sorinov, 72, Israeli footballer (Maccabi Netanya, Beitar Jerusalem, national team).
- Clive Swift, 82, English actor (The National Health, Keeping Up Appearances, A Passage to India) and songwriter.
- Les Thornton, 84, British professional wrestler (Stampede, NWA, WWF).
- Thuppettan, 89, Indian Malayalam playwright.
- William Vogel, 87, Canadian politician.
- Neville Watt, 88, Australian rugby league player (Balmain Tigers).
- Doug Wendt, 91, Australian footballer.
- Wade Wilson, 60, American football player (Minnesota Vikings, Oakland Raiders) and coach (Chicago Bears), heart attack.

=== 2 ===
- Catherine Burns, 73, American actress (Last Summer, Me, Natalie, Red Sky at Morning), complications from a fall and cirrhosis.
- Arunendu Das, 81, Indian musician.
- William Davis, 85, German-born British journalist (BBC).
- Walter James Edyvean, 80, American Roman Catholic prelate, Auxiliary Bishop of Boston (2001–2014).
- Carol Emshwiller, 97, American author (The Mount).
- Michael Ferguson, 60, Canadian civil servant, Auditor General (since 2011), cancer.
- Michelle King, 57, American educator, cancer.
- Libby Komaiko, 69, American dancer, pneumonia.
- Arman Loni, 35, Pakistani politician, PTM leader, blunt force trauma.
- Alaa Mashzoub, 50, Iraqi novelist and writer, expert on the History of the Jews in Iraq, shot.
- Slobodan Peladić, 57, Serbian artist.
- Carrie Richerson, 66, American science fiction fan and bookseller.
- Irene Krugman Rudnick, 89, American politician, member of the South Carolina House of Representatives (1972–1976, 1981–1984, 1987–1994).
- Clarence Servold, 91, Canadian cross-country skier.
- Bill Sims, 69, American blues pianist.
- William Slater, 78, Canadian Olympic swimmer.
- Special Tiara, 11, Irish racehorse, euthanized.
- Jacoba Wijnands, 94, Dutch Olympic gymnast.

=== 3 ===
- Shukri Abrahams, 50, South African cricketer (Eastern Province).
- Julie Adams, 92, American actress (Creature from the Black Lagoon, Bend of the River, Murder, She Wrote).
- Renato Giuseppe Bosisio, 88–89, Italian-born Canadian academic.
- Novak Bošković, 29, Serbian handball player, suicide by gunshot.
- Glenn Brady, 83, American football coach (Chadron State Eagles, Milwaukee Panthers, Sacramento State Hornets).
- Irv Brown, 83, American basketball referee and sportscaster.
- Jeetendra Singh Bundela, 60, Indian politician.
- Wallace Chafe, 91, American linguist.
- Detsl, 35, Russian hip hop artist, heart attack.
- Carmen Duncan, 76, Australian actress (Harlequin, Another World, Turkey Shoot), cancer.
- Bob Friend, 88, American baseball player (Pittsburgh Pirates, New York Mets, New York Yankees).
- Richard Lacey, 78, British microbiologist.
- Irving Lavin, 91, American art historian.
- Emily Levine, 73, American humorist, lung cancer.
- Tapan Mitra, 70, Indian-born American economist.
- Stephen Negoesco, 93, Romanian-American Hall of Fame soccer player and manager.
- Jüri Pihl, 64, Estonian politician, Minister of the Interior (2007–2009).
- Peter Posa, 77, New Zealand guitarist.
- Ruan Xueyu, 86, Chinese engineer.
- John Sinclair, 79, Australian conservationist.
- Barbra Casbar Siperstein, 76, American lawyer and LGBT activist.
- Kristoff St. John, 52, American actor (The Young and the Restless, The Champ, Generations), hypertrophic heart disease.
- Joe P. Tolson, 77, American politician, member of the North Carolina House of Representatives (1997–2014), respiratory failure.
- Danny Williams, 94, English football player (Rotherham United) and manager (Swindon Town, Sheffield Wednesday).
- Zhang Yumao, 83, Chinese literary scholar and politician, Vice Mayor of Shenyang, Vice Chairman of the China Democratic League.

=== 4 ===
- Giampiero Artegiani, 63, Italian singer-songwriter.
- Michel Balinski, 85, American-French applied mathematician and economist.
- Colin Barker, 79, British sociologist and historian.
- Ramesh Bhatkar, 70, Indian actor (Maherchi Sadi), cancer.
- Nita Bieber, 92, American actress (Rhythm and Weep, Millie's Daughter, The Prince Who Was a Thief).
- Yuri Bosco, 88, Russian artist.
- Matt Brazier, 42, English footballer (QPR, Cardiff City, Leyton Orient), non-Hodgkin follicular lymphoma.
- Bunny Brown, 60s, Jamaican reggae musician, bone cancer.
- Isacio Calleja, 82, Spanish footballer (Atlético de Madrid, national team).
- Awlad Hossain Chakladar, 68, Bangladeshi film producer and director.
- Sandrine Doucet, 59, French politician, Deputy (2012–2017), cancer.
- Kermit Eady, 79, American community activist.
- Fang Fukang, 83, Chinese physicist, President of Beijing Normal University (1989–1995).
- Guranda Gabunia, 80, Georgian actress (Day Is Longer Than Night).
- Naji Keyrouz, 58, Lebanese Olympic judoka (1980).
- Gary LaPierre, 76, American radio journalist (WBZ), leukemia.
- Bernard Lietaer, 76, Belgian engineer and economist.
- John Otho Marsh Jr., 92, American politician, member of the U.S. House of Representatives from Virginia's 7th district (1963–1971), Secretary of the Army (1981–1989), heart failure.
- Leu Mazurkevich, 79, Belarusian football player and manager (BATE Borisov).
- Harold Mendelsohn, 95, American sociologist.
- Bruno Messerli, 87, Swiss geographer.
- Matti Nykänen, 55, Finnish singer and ski jumper, Olympic champion (1984, 1988), pancreatitis and pneumonia.
- Leonie Ossowski, 93, German writer (Zwei Mütter).
- Vyacheslav Ovchinnikov, 82, Russian composer.
- Karen Randers-Pehrson, 86, Norwegian actress (Barn av solen).
- John Rone, 69, American stage actor and director.
- Véronique Schiltz, 76, French historian.
- Ove Kristian Sundberg, 86, Norwegian church musician, composer and musicologist.
- Mohamed Ofei Sylla, 44, Guinean footballer (Gaziantepspor, Denizlispor, national team).
- Zbigniew Szczepkowski, 66, Polish Olympic cyclist (1976).
- Ward Thomas, 95, British television executive and World War II fighter pilot.
- Joe Thornton, 102, American Cherokee archer.
- Izzy Young, 90, American-Swedish folklorist and author.

=== 5 ===
- André Boudrias, 75, Canadian ice hockey player (Vancouver Canucks, Montreal Canadiens, Minnesota North Stars).
- Audrey Cleary, 88, American politician, member of the North Dakota House of Representatives (1999–2002).
- John S. Driscoll, 84, American journalist and newspaper editor (The Boston Globe).
- Joe Fascione, 74, Scottish footballer (Chelsea, Dundee United).
- Kathleen Fraser, 83, American poet.
- Eddy Giles, 80, American R&B and blues singer-songwriter and musician.
- Jean Herskovits, 83, American historian.
- Fumiko Hori, 100, Japanese painter.
- Peter Hughes, 96, English actor (The Great Muppet Caper, Hope and Glory, Evita), pneumonia.
- Christine Kay, 54, American journalist and editor (The New York Times, Newsday, Pittsburgh Press), breast cancer.
- Syed Badr-ul Hasan Khan Bahadur, Indian actor (The Sword of Tipu Sultan, Mann, Jodhaa Akbar) and dancer.
- Garr King, 83, American judge, Senior Judge of the United States District Court for the District of Oregon (since 2009).
- George Klein, 83, American disc jockey (WLFP) and TV host (Talent Party), complications from dementia.
- Tapio Lehto, 88, Finnish Olympic triple jumper.
- Ian McDonald, 95, Australian cricketer (Victoria).
- Andy Nisbet, 65, Scottish climber, fall.
- Pericles Panagopoulos, 83, Greek shipping magnate.
- Joe Presko, 90, American baseball player (St. Louis Cardinals, Detroit Tigers).
- Manasa Qoro, 54, Fijian rugby union player (national team).
- Miriam Rivera, 38, Mexican reality show personality (There's Something About Miriam, Big Brother Australia 2004).
- Arik Rudich, 65, Israeli film score composer (Drifting, Bar 51), heart attack.
- Anne Firor Scott, 97, American historian.
- Edward H. Simpson, 96, British statistician and civil servant.
- Ladu Kishore Swain, 71, Indian politician, member of the Lok Sabha (since 2014), kidney disease.
- Doc Thompson, 49, American radio personality, hit by train.
- Mel Tomlinson, 65, American dancer and choreographer.
- Václav Vorlíček, 88, Czech film director (Who Wants to Kill Jessie?, The End of Agent W4C, The Girl on the Broomstick).
- Guy Webster, 79, American celebrity photographer (The Doors, The Beach Boys, The Rolling Stones), complications from diabetes and liver cancer.
- Ken Yanz, 89, Australian rugby union player.
- Vano Zodelava, 61, Georgian politician, Mayor of Tbilisi (1998–2004), injuries from a traffic collision.

=== 6 ===
- Rudi Assauer, 74, German football player (Borussia Dortmund, Werder Bremen) and manager (Schalke 04), complications from Alzheimer's disease.
- Edwin Barnes, 84, British Roman Catholic priest (since 2011) and former Anglican prelate, Bishop of Richborough (1995–2002).
- David Beaird, 66, American screenwriter and director (My Chauffeur, Scorchers).
- Dick Blok, 94, Dutch medievalist.
- Gizella Bodnár, 92, Hungarian serial burglar.
- Jorge Brown, 89, Argentine Olympic sailor.
- Edward Burn, 96, British legal scholar.
- Tom Cade, 91, American ornithologist.
- John Cocks, 52, New Zealand builder and television personality (My House My Castle), kidney cancer.
- Beatrice Colin, 55, British novelist, ovarian cancer.
- Paul Dewar, 56, Canadian politician, MP (2006–2015), glioblastoma.
- Jairo do Nascimento, 72, Brazilian footballer (Corinthians, Coritiba), kidney cancer.
- Yechiel Eckstein, 67, Israeli-American rabbi, founder of International Fellowship of Christians and Jews, heart attack.
- Manfred Eigen, 91, German biophysical chemist, Nobel Prize laureate (1967).
- Gerald English, 93, British tenor.
- Marcia Falkender, Baroness Falkender, 86, British politician.
- Fang Renqiu, 89, Chinese football player and coach (national team).
- Bill Gittings, 80, English rugby union player.
- Michael Green, 88, British theologian.
- Don Johnson, 88, American basketball player and coach.
- Alan J. Justin, 80, American politician.
- Todor Kavaldzhiev, 85, Bulgarian politician, Vice President (1997–2002).
- Franklin Nelson, 85, American politician.
- Vikki Orvice, 56, British sports journalist, breast cancer.
- Rosamunde Pilcher, 94, British author (The Shell Seekers), stroke.
- Mags Portman, 44, British physician, advocate for PrEP in fight against HIV, mesothelioma.
- Richard Schwartz, 76, American bridge player.
- A. S. M. Shahjahan, 78, Bangladeshi officer, Inspector General of Police (1992–1996), complications from Parkinson's disease.
- Lonnie Simmons, 74, American record producer, founder of Total Experience Records.
- Ye Qingyao, 91, Taiwanese-born Chinese engineer and politician, Vice Chairman of the Fujian CPPCC.
- Tilly van der Zwaard, 81, Dutch Olympic athlete (1964, 1968).

=== 7 ===
- Margaret Alston-Garnjost, 90, British physicist.
- Chavara Parukutty Amma, 75, Indian dancer and teacher.
- Miriam Argüello, 91, Nicaraguan politician, President of the National Assembly (1990–2012).
- Robert Ashby, 79, British actor (Gentlemen and Players, Legend, Doctor Who).
- John Tyler Bonner, 98, American biologist.
- John Dingell, 92, American politician, member of the U.S. House of Representatives (1955–2015), prostate cancer.
- Albert Finney, 82, English actor (Tom Jones, The Gathering Storm, Big Fish), BAFTA winner (1961), chest infection.
- Les Flintoff, 88, Australian rules footballer (Richmond).
- Satoshi Hiyamizu, 75, Japanese electrical engineer.
- James Jackson Hough, 73, American businessman and philanthropist, shot.
- Per Olov Jansson, 98, Finnish photographer.
- Al Johnson, 83, Canadian ice hockey player (Montreal Canadiens, Detroit Red Wings).
- Alfred Lecerf, 70, Belgian politician, Mayor of Lontzen (1994–2018) and member of the Parliament of the German-speaking Community (1978–1981).
- Mable Lee, 97, American tap dancer.
- Legarda, 29, Colombian singer.
- Rocky Lockridge, 60, American boxer, WBA super featherweight champion (1984–1985), complications from a stroke.
- Morag Loh, 83, Australian writer.
- Heidi Mohr, 51, German footballer (TuS Niederkirchen, TuS Ahrbach, national team), cancer.
- Arthur Murphy, 90, Irish broadcaster (Mailbag).
- Caroline Mwatha, 37, Kenyan human rights activist, bleeding from ruptured uterus after unsafe abortion.
- Randy Nauert, 74, American surf rock musician (The Bel-Airs, The Challengers), heart attack.
- Jan Olszewski, 88, Polish politician, Prime Minister (1991–1992).
- Frank Robinson, 83, American Hall of Fame baseball player (Cincinnati Reds, Baltimore Orioles) and manager (Cleveland Indians), bone cancer.
- Sylvia Ruuska, 76, American Olympic swimmer.
- Jörg Schönbohm, 81, German military officer and politician, Inspector of the Army (1991–1992) and Deputy Minister President of Brandenburg (1999–2009).
- Bill Spence, 78, American hammered dulcimer player.
- Edward Zigler, 88, American psychologist.

=== 8 ===
- Rune Åhlund, 88, Swedish Olympic long-distance runner.
- Mahesh Anand, 57, Indian actor (Karishmaa, Lahu Ke Do Rang).
- Seweryn Bialer, 92, German-born American political scientist.
- Nick Bucci, 86, American football player.
- Frankie Byrne, 94, Irish Gaelic footballer (Meath).
- Fernando Clavijo, 63, Uruguayan-born American soccer player (San Diego Sockers, national team) and manager (Colorado Rapids), multiple myeloma.
- Zbigniew Czajkowski, 98, Polish fencing coach.
- Sharif Fayez, 73, Afghan academic and politician, Minister of Higher Education (2001–2007), heart attack.
- Georg Gerster, 90, Swiss journalist and aerial photographer.
- Knut Haavik, 75, Norwegian journalist and editor (Se og Hør).
- Dick Kempthorn, 92, American football player (Michigan Wolverines) and businessman.
- Angel Koritarov, 77, Bulgarian Olympic volleyball player (1964, 1968).
- Jacques Labertonnière, 92, French racing cyclist.
- Robert Maguire, 87, British architect.
- Bert McKasy, 77, American politician, member of the Minnesota House of Representatives (1983–1988).
- Jim Miller, 76, Scottish linguist.
- Harald Motzki, 70, Dutch Islam scholar.
- Walter Munk, 101, Austrian-born American oceanographer, member of the Navy Electronics Laboratory.
- Cliff Myers, 72, English footballer (Charlton Athletic, Yeovil Town, Torquay United).
- Anilkumar Patel, 73, Indian politician, prostate cancer.
- Wolfgang Rindler, 94, Austrian-born American physicist, (Event Horizon, Rindler coordinates).
- Gary Robinson, 70, Canadian football player (BC Lions). (death announced on this date)
- Hanno Rumpf, 60, Namibian politician and diplomat, Ambassador to Germany (2003–2006).
- Robert Ryman, 88, American painter.
- Kurt Sommerlatt, 90, German football player (Karlsruher SC, Bayern Munich) and manager (Borussia Neunkirchen).
- Vishnu Wagh, 53, Indian writer.
- Sergei Yursky, 83, Russian actor (Time, Forward!, The Golden Calf, The Meeting Place Cannot Be Changed).

=== 9 ===
- Salvatore Bellomo, 67, Belgian professional wrestler (ASW, WWF, ECW), cancer.
- Bentong, 55, Filipino comedian, actor and television host, cardiac arrest.
- Satyajit Biswas, 37, Indian politician, shot.
- Cadet, 28, British rapper, traffic collision.
- Jerry Casale, 85, American baseball player (Boston Red Sox, Detroit Tigers).
- Dan Cashman, 85, American actor.
- Barney Cooney, 84, Australian politician, Senator (1984–2002).
- Siamion Domash, 69, Belarusian politician, heart attack.
- Farhad Ebrahimi, 83, Iranian poet and writer.
- Mario Gerla, 75, Italian computer scientist, pancreatic cancer.
- Niki Goulandris, 94, Greek philanthropist and painter.
- Aina Moll Marquès, 88, Spanish philologist of Catalan language and politician.
- Ana Nisi Goyco, 68, Puerto Rican beauty queen and politician, member of the Senate (1980–1992).
- Huang Erh-hsuan, 82, Taiwanese politician, MLY (1993–2002).
- Nicholas Kafoglis, 89, American politician, member of the Kentucky House of Representatives (1972–1976) and Senate (1988–1998), complications from broken hip.
- Mick Kennedy, 57, Irish footballer (Portsmouth, Stoke City, Halifax Town).
- Katharina Lindner, 39, German-born Scottish footballer (Glasgow City).
- Shelley Lubben, 50, American adult film actress and anti-pornography activist.
- Ron W. Miller, 85, American businessman and football player (Los Angeles Rams), President and CEO of The Walt Disney Company (1978–1984), heart failure.
- Robert K. Murray, 96, American historian.
- Fred Pickering, 78, English footballer (Blackburn Rovers, Everton, national team).
- Maximilian Reinelt, 30, German rower, Olympic champion (2012) and silver medalist (2016), heart attack.
- Ian Ross, 72, Scottish footballer (Liverpool, Aston Villa, Peterborough United).
- Junya Sato, 86, Japanese film director (Kimi yo Fundo no Kawa o Watare, Ningen no Shōmei, Never Give Up).
- Tomi Ungerer, 87, French book illustrator (The Three Robbers, Flat Stanley), cartoonist and film poster designer (Dr. Strangelove).
- Patricia Nell Warren, 82, American author (The Front Runner).
- Milt Welch, 94, American baseball player (Detroit Tigers).
- Phil Western, 47, Canadian electronic musician (Download, PlatEAU).
- Bruce Williams, 86, American Hall of Fame radio host (WCTC, WMCA).
- Robert Winter, 94, American architectural historian.
- Neville Young, 78, New Zealand lawyer, president of the New Zealand National Party (1986–1989).

=== 10 ===
- Bethel Nnaemeka Amadi, 54, Nigerian politician, President of the Pan-African Parliament (2012–2015).
- Carmen Argenziano, 75, American actor (Stargate SG-1, Booker, Angels & Demons), lung cancer.
- Jogesh Chandra Barman, 69, Indian politician.
- Virginia Walcott Beauchamp, 98, American educator.
- Mario Bernardo, 99, Italian cinematographer (Love and Troubles, Love Meetings, The Hawks and the Sparrows) and Resistance fighter.
- Miranda Bonansea, 92, Italian actress (Hands Off Me!) and voice actress.
- Babette Brown, 87, South African writer.
- Red Cashion, 87, American football official (NFL).
- Terry Dempsey, 77, English-born South African songwriter, struck by gyrocopter.
- Juanjo Domínguez, 67, Argentine classical guitarist.
- Eric Dunning, 82, British sociologist.
- David Ejoor, 87, Nigerian military officer, Chief of Army Staff (1971–1975).
- Heinz Fütterer, 87, German sprinter, Olympic bronze medalist (1956).
- Robert Ghanem, 76, Lebanese politician, MP (1992–2018).
- Dinualdo Gutierrez, 79, Filipino Roman Catholic prelate, Bishop of Marbel (1981–2018).
- Walter B. Jones Jr., 76, American politician, member of the U.S. House of Representatives (since 1995), amyotrophic lateral sclerosis.
- Peter Kidson, 93, British architectural historian.
- Kōji Kitao, 55, Japanese sumo and professional wrestler (AWA, NJPW).
- Éva Marion, 93, French Olympic sprint canoeist.
- Sam McCready, 82, Northern Irish actor, playwright and theatre director.
- Roderick MacFarquhar, 88, British politician, journalist and historian, MP (1970–1978).
- Nicolas M. Mondejar, 94, Filipino Roman Catholic prelate, Bishop of Romblon (1974–1987) and San Carlos (1987–2001).
- Fernando Peres, 76, Portuguese football player (Sporting CP, national team) and manager (Sanjoanense).
- Daniel Silva dos Santos, 36, Brazilian footballer, cancer.
- Joseph Sirola, 89, American actor (The City, Hang 'Em High, The Greatest Story Ever Told), respiratory failure.
- Maura Viceconte, 51, Italian Olympic long-distance runner (1996, 2000), suicide by hanging.
- Jan-Michael Vincent, 73, American actor (Airwolf, The Mechanic, Big Wednesday), heart attack.
- Michael Wilson, 81, Canadian politician and diplomat, Ambassador to the United States (2006–2009), cancer.
- Jackie Young, 84, American politician, member of the Hawaii House of Representatives (1990–1994).

=== 11 ===
- Ben Abell, 86, American meteorologist.
- Alix, Princess of Ligne, 89, Luxembourg royal.
- Vijaya Bapineedu, 82, Indian film director (Gang Leader, Big Boss, Family), complications from Alzheimer's disease.
- Nora Bennis, 78, Irish political activist.
- Ricardo Boechat, 66, Argentine-born Brazilian journalist (O Globo, O Dia, Jornal do Brasil), helicopter crash.
- Winslow Briggs, 90, American plant biologist.
- James Burns, 89, Canadian executive.
- Jack Crimian, 92, American baseball player (St. Louis Cardinals, Kansas City Athletics, Detroit Tigers).
- Louis de Niverville, 85, Canadian painter.
- Abelardo Escobar Prieto, 81, Mexican politician, Secretary of Agrarian Reform (2006-2012) and Deputy (2000-2003), kidney failure.
- Réal Giguère, 85, Canadian television host.
- He Bingsong, 87, Chinese legal scholar.
- Ivan Irwin, 91, American-born Canadian ice hockey player (New York Rangers, Montreal Canadiens).
- Jeffrey Miles, 83, Australian jurist, Chief Justice of the Australian Capital Territory (1985–2002).
- Sibghatullah Mojaddedi, 93, Afghan politician, Acting President (1992).
- Taiwo Ogunjobi, 65, Nigerian football player (Shooting Stars, national team) and administrator.
- Delroy Poyser, 57, Jamaican long jumper, CAC champion (1982), cancer.
- Eulade Rudahunga, 97, Rwandan Roman Catholic priest.
- Harvey Scales, 78, American soul singer and songwriter ("Disco Lady", "Love-Itis"), kidney failure and pneumonia.
- Joe Schlesinger, 90, Canadian journalist (CBC News).
- Armida Siguion-Reyna, 88, Filipino actress, singer and television host, cancer.
- Lou Sossamon, 97, American football player (South Carolina Gamecocks, New York Yankees).
- Herman H. Spitz, 93, American psychologist.
- Allan Wild, 91, New Zealand architect and academic (University of Auckland).

=== 12 ===
- Betty Ballantine, 99, British-born American book publisher (Ballantine Books, Bantam Books).
- Gordon Banks, 81, English footballer (Leicester City, Stoke City, national team), world champion (1966).
- Louis Belzile, 89, Canadian painter.
- Rolf Böhme, 84, German politician, Deputy (1972–1982) and Mayor of Freiburg (1982–2002).
- Christoph Broelsch, 74, German surgeon.
- Cheng Zhiqing, 84, Chinese chemist and politician, Vice Chairwoman of the Revolutionary Committee of the Chinese Kuomintang.
- Jean E. Fairfax, 98, American educator.
- Bashir-ud-din Farooqi, 85, Grand Mufti of Jammu and Kashmir.
- David Forden, 88, American intelligence officer (CIA), complications from Alzheimer's disease.
- Godzilla, 31, Tanzanian rapper.
- W. E. B. Griffin, 89, American writer (Brotherhood of War, The Corps, Badge of Honor), cancer.
- George Grindley, 93, New Zealand geologist.
- Altay Hajiyev, 87, Azerbaijani painter.
- Nevarte Hamparian, 92, American dancer.
- George Irish, 76, Montserratian academic, musician and writer.
- Georg Jann, 85, German organ builder.
- Afsir Karim, 85, Indian army general and author.
- Ferenc Keserű, 72, Hungarian Olympic cyclist (1968).
- Lyndon LaRouche, 96, American political activist, founder of the LaRouche movement.
- Olli Lindholm, 54, Finnish singer and guitarist (Appendix, Yö), seizure.
- Suresh Luthra, 74, Indian cricketer (Delhi).
- Rosemary Madigan, 92, Australian sculptor.
- Pedro Morales, 76, Puerto Rican Hall of Fame professional wrestler (WWA, WWWF) and commentator (WWF Superstars), complications from Parkinson's disease.
- Austin Rhodes, 81, English rugby league player (St Helens, Leigh) and coach (Swinton).
- Erik Schønfeldt, 76, Norwegian handball player and footballer.
- John Senders, 98, American industrial engineer.
- Bisi Silva, 56, Nigerian art curator, cancer.
- Marisa Solinas, 79, Italian singer and actress (Boccaccio '70, La commare secca, Almost Blue).
- Lucjan Trela, 76, Polish Olympic boxer (1968).
- David Walton, 73, British ecologist.
- Elizabeth Weisburger, 94, American chemist.
- Harry Hon Hai Wong, 96, Chinese entrepreneur.
- Zhan Ziqing, 81, Chinese historian, Vice President of Northeast Normal University.

=== 13 ===
- Idriz Ajeti, 101, Kosovar Albanologist.
- Julius Beinortas, 76, Lithuanian politician.
- Samuel Boan, 67, American politician.
- Lino (Carmel) Gauci Borda, 82, Maltese politician.
- Mohan Singh Bundela, 74, Indian politician.
- Paul Cain, 89, American Pentecostal minister, pneumonia.
- Greg Alyn Carlson, 47, American criminal, shot.
- Jack Coghill, 93, American politician, member of the Alaska House of Representatives (1953–1955, 1957–1959) and Senate (1959–1965, 1985–1990), Lieutenant Governor (1990–1994).
- Frances Culbertson, 98, American psychologist.
- Bibi Ferreira, 96, Brazilian actress (Leonora of the Seven Seas, The End of the River) and singer.
- Eric Harrison, 81, English football player (Halifax Town) and coach (Manchester United).
- Edith Iglauer, 101, American writer.
- Connie Jones, 84, American jazz trumpeter.
- Vitaliy Khmelnytskyi, 75, Ukrainian football player (Dynamo Kyiv, USSR national team) and manager (Granit Cherkasy).
- Christopher Knopf, 91, American screenwriter and union executive, president of WGA and IAWG, heart failure.
- Miroslav Kusý, 87, Slovak political scientist, heart failure.
- Helene Machado, 92, American baseball player (Peoria Redwings, Fort Wayne Daisies).
- Dick Manville, 93, American baseball player (Boston Braves, Chicago Cubs).
- Baqar Naqvi, 83, Pakistani Urdu poet and translator.
- Callistus Ndlovu, 83, Zimbabwean academic and politician, pancreatic cancer.
- Joyce Anne Noel, 86, American beauty queen, Miss Rhode Island (1953), Miss Rhode Island USA (1954), First Lady of Rhode Island (1973–1977).
- Ray Price, 88, American speechwriter (Richard Nixon, Gerald Ford), stroke.
- Simon P. Norton, 66, English mathematician, heart disease.
- Rick Rasnick, 59, American college football coach.
- Ann Loreille Saunders, 88, British historian.
- Arif Şirin, 69, Turkish singer and composer, throat cancer.
- Hans Stadlmair, 89, Austrian conductor.
- Jörg Streli, 78, Austrian architect.
- Dezső Tandori, 80, Hungarian poet and writer.
- Jimmy Turman, 91, American politician, member (1955–1963) and Speaker (1961–1963) of the Texas House of Representatives, stroke.
- Ted Tsukiyama, 98, American attorney and bonsai enthusiast.
- Zhang Li, 67, Chinese table tennis player, lung cancer.

=== 14 ===
- David J. Batten, 75, British palynologist, cancer.
- Michel Bernard, 87, French Olympic middle- and long-distance runner (1960, 1964).
- Michael Black, 90, British sculptor.
- Sir David Collins, 69, British educator, cancer.
- Francis D'Souza, 64, Indian politician, Deputy Chief Minister of Goa (2012–2017) and MLA (since 1999), cancer.
- Tommy Giordano, 93, American baseball player (Philadelphia Athletics) and scout (Baltimore Orioles), blood infection.
- John Hanscomb, 94, British politician, Mayor of Bolton (1982–1983).
- John Hellawell, 75, English footballer (Bradford City).
- Tokitsunada Hironori, 49, Japanese sumo wrestler, heart failure.
- David Horowitz, 81, American consumer reporter and journalist (Fight Back! with David Horowitz).
- Barrie Hutchinson, 92, New Zealand water polo player, British Empire Games silver medalist (1950), rugby union player (Wellington, Auckland).
- Kao Chun-ming, 89, Taiwanese Presbyterian minister and political prisoner.
- Rocky Krsnich, 91, American baseball player (Chicago White Sox).
- Kwong Hon-sang, 80, Hong Kong engineer and civil servant, Secretary for Works (1995–1999).
- Andrea Levy, 62, English author (Small Island, The Long Song), cancer.
- Michael Nudelman, 80, Israeli politician, member of the Knesset (1996–2009).
- Neil Papiano, 85, American lawyer.
- Alfred Radley, 94, British fashion designer.
- David Sopher, 90, Indian Olympic water polo player.
- Mary Beth Stearns, 93, American solid-state physicist.
- Clinton Wheeler, 59, American basketball player (Bayer Giants Leverkusen, Indiana Pacers).
- Sergei Zakharov, 68, Russian singer, heart failure.

=== 15 ===
- Sal Artiaga, 72, American baseball executive, President of Minor League Baseball (1988–1991).
- Ellis Avery, 46, American writer (The Teahouse Fire), leiomyosarcoma.
- Thomas Bruice, 93, American biochemist, complications from a stroke.
- Kofi Burbridge, 57, American rock multi-instrumentalist (Tedeschi Trucks Band, The Derek Trucks Band, Aquarium Rescue Unit), heart attack.
- Efrain Chacurian, 94, Argentine-born American soccer player (Racing Club, Bridgeport Vasco da Gama, national team).
- Terry Charman, 68, English military historian and museum curator (Imperial War Museum), cancer.
- Erminie Cohen, 92, Canadian politician, Senator (1993–2001).
- Thomas Joseph Costello, 89, American Roman Catholic prelate, Auxiliary Bishop of Syracuse (1978–2004).
- Pence Dacus, 87, American football player (Texas State Bobcats) and coach (Pepperdine Waves).
- Siegfried Engelmann, 87, American educationist, co-developer of Direct Instruction.
- Sir Charles Farr, 59, British civil servant, Chair of Joint Intelligence Committee (since 2015), cancer.
- Jens Feder, 80, Norwegian physicist.
- Antonio César Fernández, 72, Spanish Salesian missionary, shot.
- Sara Gizaw, 90, Ethiopian aristocrat.
- Ragnar Halvorsen, 94, Norwegian businessman and union leader, Chairman of the Export Council (1987–1992).
- Shamil Isayev, 54, Russian footballer (Uralan Elista, Tavriya Simferopol, Spartak Vladikavkaz).
- Gene Littler, 88, American Hall of Fame professional golfer, U.S. Open winner (1961).
- Tsedenjavyn Lkhamjav, 78, Mongolian Olympic speed skater.
- Al Mahmud, 82, Bangladeshi poet and novelist, pneumonia.
- Zlatica Mijatović, 96, Serbian Olympic gymnast (1948).
- Adriano Ossicini, 98, Italian politician, Senator (1968–1992, 1996–2001) and Minister for Family (1995–1996), complications from a fall.
- Mohamed Purnomo, 57, Indonesian Olympic sprinter (1984), cancer.
- Lee Radziwill, 85, American socialite.
- Erika Simon, 91, German archaeologist.
- Alice Sluckin, 99, Czech-born British social worker and psychologist.
- Dave Smith, 78, American archivist (Walt Disney).
- John Stalker, 79, British police officer, Deputy Chief Constable of Greater Manchester Police (1984–1987).
- J. Mary Taylor, 87, American mammalogist.
- Lou Wacker, 84, American football player (Calgary Stampeders).
- Mikhail Yuryev, 59, Russian politician, Member of the Duma (1996–1999).

=== 16 ===
- Sam Bass, 57, American motorsports artist, sepsis.
- Don Bragg, 83, American pole vaulter, Olympic champion (1960), complications from Parkinson's disease.
- Patrick Caddell, 68, American pollster, complications from a stroke.
- Fang Huai, 101, Chinese military officer, major general of PLA.
- Bruno Ganz, 77, Swiss actor (Downfall, Wings of Desire, Nosferatu the Vampyre), colorectal cancer.
- Richard N. Gardner, 91, American diplomat, Ambassador to Italy (1977–1981) and Spain and Andorra (1993–1997).
- Gu Linfang, 90, Chinese police official and politician, Secretary-General of the Central Political and Legal Affairs Commission and Vice Minister of Public Security.
- Jeffrey Hart, 88, American cultural critic.
- Michael Killisch-Horn, 78, Austrian politician, announcer and skier, MP (1986–1990).
- Juan Incháustegui, 80, Peruvian engineer and politician, Minister of Energy and Mines (1984–1985) and of Industry, Foreign Trade and Tourism (2001), Senator (1990–1992).
- Thomas R. Kane, 94, American engineer.
- Li Rui, 101, Chinese politician, historian and dissident, organ failure.
- Albert Ludwig, 99, Canadian politician, Alberta MLA (1959–1975)
- Bernie McCarthy, 75, Australian VFL footballer (North Melbourne)
- Serge Merlin, 86, French actor (Amélie, The City of Lost Children).
- Charles Mungoshi, 71, Zimbabwean writer, cerebral atrophy from stroke.
- Ken Nordine, 98, American voice-over and recording artist (Word Jazz, Son of Word Jazz, Love Words).
- Frank Pitura, 75, Canadian politician, member of the Manitoba Legislature (1995–2003).
- Theodore Isaac Rubin, 95, American psychiatrist.
- Shelly Saltman, 87, American sports promoter.
- Silvestre Luís Scandián, 87, Brazilian Roman Catholic prelate, Bishop of Araçuaí (1975–1981) and Archbishop of Vitória (1984–2004).
- Nani Soedarsono, 90, Indonesian politician, Minister of Social Welfare (1983–1988).
- Kees Stoop, 89, Dutch artist.
- Willie Thomas, 88, American jazz trumpeter.
- Albert Vorspan, 95, American political activist.
- Eyvind Wichmann, 90, Finnish-born American theoretical physicist.

=== 17 ===
- Joseph Akouissone, 76, Central African filmmaker and journalist.
- Monjur Ahmed Bacchu Mia, 84, Bangladeshi politician.
- Eduardo Bauzá, 79, Argentine politician, Minister of Health (1989–1990) and of the Interior (1989–1990), Chief of the Cabinet of Ministers (1995–1996).
- Ragnar Christiansen, 96, Norwegian politician, Minister of Finance (1971–1972), Minister of Transport (1976–1978) and County Governor of Buskerud (1979–1989).
- Ethel Ennis, 86, American jazz singer, stroke.
- Carlos Flores, 44, Peruvian footballer (Universitario, national team), heart attack.
- Paul Flynn, 84, British politician, MP for Newport West (since 1987).
- Alberto Gutman, 60, Cuban-born American politician, member of the Florida House of Representatives (1984–1992) and Senate (1992–1999).
- Kálmán Györgyi, 79, Hungarian jurist and academic, Chief Prosecutor (1990–2000).
- Eric P. Hamp, 98, American linguist.
- Bill Jenkins, 73, American epidemiologist, complications from sarcoidosis.
- Antons Justs, 87, Latvian Roman Catholic prelate, Bishop of Jelgava (1995–2011).
- Olivia Leyva, 70, Mexican actress (El Chavo del Ocho), television presenter and model.
- Ami Maayani, 83, Israeli composer, cancer.
- Tom Nomina, 77, American football player (Denver Broncos, Miami Dolphins).
- S. M. Qureshi, 83, Pakistani academician and civil servant.
- Paul Ramos, 28, Argentine footballer (Belgrano, Sport Loreto, Gimnasia y Esgrima), traffic collision.
- Frederico Rosa, 61, Portuguese footballer (Boavista, Estrela Amadora, national team), amyotrophic lateral sclerosis.
- Šaban Šaulić, 67, Serbian folk singer, traffic collision.
- Kelly Seymour, 82, South African cricketer (Western Province, national team).
- Johnny Valentine, 88, Scottish footballer (Queen's Park, Rangers, St Johnstone).

=== 18 ===
- Thomas T. Allsen, 78–79, American historian.
- Eve Billing, 95, British plant pathologist.
- Anna Borgeryd, 49, Swedish business executive (Polarbröd).
- Wallace Smith Broecker, 87, American geophysicist, coined the term "global warming".
- Hugues Broussard, 84, French Olympic swimmer.
- John Carlisle, 76, British politician, MP (1979–1997), heart attack.
- George Cawkwell, 99, New Zealand classical scholar.
- O'Neal Compton, 68, American actor (Deep Impact, Roadracers, Kill Me Later).
- Kevin Conner, 92, American theologian.
- T. J. Cunningham, 46, American football player (Seattle Seahawks), shot.
- Stewart Dalzell, 75, American senior judge of the District Court for the Eastern District of Pennsylvania.
- Charles Deblois, 79, Canadian politician, member of the House of Commons (1988–1993).
- Valentina Dimitrieva, 81, Russian farm worker.
- Brian Edgley, 81, English footballer (Shrewsbury Town, Cardiff City, Brentford).
- Mary Ann Feldman, 85, American music critic.
- Skip Groff, 70, American record producer and DJ, seizure.
- Jan Hermansson, 76, Swedish aikidoka.
- Pamela Huby, 96, British philosopher.
- Louise Manoogian Simone, 85, American philanthropist, president of the Armenian General Benevolent Union (1989–2002).
- Alessandro Mendini, 87, Italian architect and designer (Groninger Museum).
- Toni Myers, 75, Canadian IMAX documentarian (Space Station 3D, Hubble, A Beautiful Planet), cancer.
- Nafiu Osagie, 85, Nigerian Olympic high jumper (1952).
- Jean Périsson, 94, French conductor.
- Wim Richter, 72, South African chemist.
- Kor Sarr, 43, Senegalese football player (Beauvais, Caen) and manager (AS Pikine).
- Alfons Sidler, 84, Swiss Olympic runner.
- Laura Solomon, 44, New Zealand novelist, brain cancer.
- George Springer, 94, American mathematician and computer scientist.
- Russell Sugarmon, 89, American judge and politician, member of the Tennessee House of Representatives (1967–1969).
- John Traupman, 96, American classical scholar.
- Ram Shankar Tripathi, 89, Indian Buddhist scholar.
- Bob Van Der Veken, 90, Belgian actor (De Collega's).
- Peter Wells, 69, New Zealand writer and filmmaker (Desperate Remedies), prostate cancer.
- Alfred Zeien, 88, American businessman (Gillette).

=== 19 ===
- Marie-Claire Bancquart, 86, French poet and literary critic.
- Dick Boushka, 84, American basketball player, Olympic gold medallist (1956).
- Loretta Braxton, 85, American mathematician.
- Giulio Brogi, 83, Italian actor (Days of Fire, Morel's Invention, The Yes Man).
- Elin C. Danien, 89, American anthropologist.
- Amir Gulistan Janjua, 95, Pakistani army officer and governor of the North-West Frontier Province.
- Hu Peiquan, 98, Chinese aerospace engineer and educator.
- Paul Janeczko, 73, American poet and anthologist.
- Muhammad Khasru, 73, Bangladeshi journalist, complications from diabetes and pneumonia.
- Alan R. King, 64, British linguist.
- Karl Lagerfeld, 85, German fashion designer (Chloé, Fendi, Chanel), pancreatic cancer.
- Abdoulaye Yerodia Ndombasi, 86, Congolese politician, Minister of Foreign Affairs (1999–2000) and Vice-President (2003–2006).
- Don Newcombe, 92, American baseball player (Los Angeles Dodgers, Cincinnati Reds, Cleveland Indians).
- João Paulo dos Reis Veloso, 87, Brazilian economist, Minister of Planning (1969–1979), president of the Institute of Applied Economic Research (1969).
- Namvar Singh, 92, Indian writer.
- Charles E. Springer, 90, American judge.
- Artie Wayne, 77, American musician, songwriter and record producer.
- Ewald Weibel, 89, Swiss biologist.
- Stanley Wolpert, 91, American Indologist.

=== 20 ===
- Chelo Alonso, 85, Cuban actress (Goliath and the Barbarians, Morgan the Pirate, Run, Man, Run).
- An Zuozhang, 92, Chinese historian, heart attack.
- Amar Basu, 79, Indian politician.
- Dominick Argento, 91, American composer, Pulitzer Prize winner (1975).
- Mark Bramble, 68, American theatre director and producer (Barnum, 42nd Street), cardiovascular hypertension.
- William Broomfield, 96, American politician, member of the United States House of Representatives from Michigan's 18th and 19th districts (1957–1993).
- Alma Butia, 90, Croatian Olympic sprinter (1948).
- Fabien Clain, 41, French terrorist, airstrike.
- Teotónio de Souza, 72, Portuguese historian.
- Dimosthenis Theocharidis, 104, Greek politician.
- John P. Flaherty Jr., 87, American judge, Chief Justice of the Supreme Court of Pennsylvania (1996–2001).
- David P. B. Fitzpatrick, 69, Irish historian.
- Fred Foster, 87, American Hall of Fame record producer ("Only the Lonely", "Oh, Pretty Woman") and songwriter ("Me and Bobby McGee").
- Joe Gibbon, 83, American baseball player (Pittsburgh Pirates, San Francisco Giants, Cincinnati Reds).
- Claude Goretta, 89, Swiss film director (The Invitation, La provinciale, The Death of Mario Ricci).
- Kemal Karpat, 96, Turkish historian, multiple organ failure.
- James W. Lance, 92, Australian neurologist.
- Francisco Mañosa, 88, Filipino architect (Coconut Palace, EDSA Shrine), National Artist (2018).
- Augustus Richard Norton, 72, American professor.
- Michael Pereira, 86, Kenyan Olympic hockey player (1956).
- Nandyala Srinivasa Reddy, 101, Indian politician.
- Peter Rüchel, 81, German music journalist, founder of Rockpalast.
- Herlinda Sánchez Laurel, 77, Mexican artist.
- Bruno Schroder, 86, British banker (Schroders).
- Vinny Vella, 72, American actor (Casino, Ghost Dog: The Way of the Samurai, The Sopranos) and comedian, liver cancer.
- Boris Vieru, 61, Moldovan politician and journalist, MP (2009–2014).
- William von Raab, 77, American attorney.
- Ekkehard Wlaschiha, 80, German operatic baritone, Grammy winner (1990, 1991).
- Ken Young, 76, British political scientist.
- Zhang Wenbin, 81, Chinese archaeologist, curator and politician, Director of the National Cultural Heritage Administration (1996–2002).

=== 21 ===
- Gus Backus, 81, American singer (The Del-Vikings).
- Brahmanapalli Balaiah, Indian politician, MLA (1978–1983), heart attack.
- Rajkumar Barjatya, 75–76, Indian movie producer.
- Jean-Christophe Benoît, 93, French baritone.
- Bernard Berg, 87, Luxembourgish politician, Deputy Prime Minister (1976–1979).
- Triny Bourkel, 91, Luxembourgish Olympic athlete (1948).
- Paolo Brera, 69, Italian novelist and journalist, heart attack.
- Nick Cafardo, 62, American sports journalist (The Boston Globe), embolism.
- Sue Casey, 92, American actress (The Secret Life of Walter Mitty, Rear Window, American Beauty).
- Maurizio Clerici, 89, Italian Olympic rower (1956).
- Sequeira Costa, 89, Portuguese pianist, cancer.
- Stanley Donen, 94, American film director (Singin' in the Rain, On the Town, Seven Brides for Seven Brothers), heart failure.
- E Dongchen, 79, Chinese earth scientist and polar explorer.
- Edward Enfield, 89, British television and radio presenter, and newspaper journalist.
- Julio Fuller, 62, Costa Rican footballer (Limonense, Cartaginés, national team).
- Harri Järvi, 79, Finnish footballer (HPK, national team).
- Gordon McTavish, 94, Canadian curler.
- Giuseppe Mifsud Bonnici, 88, Maltese magistrate, Chief Justice (1990–1995) and member of the European Court of Human Rights (1992–1998).
- Mohammad Momen, 81, Iranian Faqīh and politician.
- Sir Rupert Myers, 98, Australian metallurgist and academic, Vice-Chancellor of the University of New South Wales (1969–1981).
- Lee Ocran, Ghanaian politician, MP (2005–2009) and Minister for Education (2012–2013).
- Alojzy Orszulik, 90, Polish Roman Catholic prelate, Bishop of Łowicz (1992–2004).
- Beverley Owen, 81, American actress (The Munsters), ovarian cancer.
- Antonia Rey, 92, Cuban-born American actress.
- Herlinda Sánchez Laurel, 77, Mexican artist.
- Jackie Shane, 78, American singer.
- Peter Tork, 77, American musician and actor (The Monkees), complications from adenoid cystic carcinoma.
- Lionel Upton, 94, Australian footballer (North Melbourne).
- Hilde Zadek, 101, German soprano.

=== 22 ===
- Jeff Adachi, 59, American attorney, San Francisco Public Defender (since 2003), heart attack.
- Frank Ballance, 77, American politician and convicted criminal, member of the U.S. House of Representatives (2003–2004), North Carolina House (1983–1986) and Senate (1989–2002), complications during surgery.
- Victor J. Banis, 82, American author, liver cancer.
- Werner Beierwaltes, 87, German philosophy historian.
- Aston Cooke, 61, Jamaican dramatist and playwright.
- Gordon Leslie Herries Davies, 86, British-Irish geographer.
- Clark James Gable, 30, American actor and television host (Cheaters), accidental drug overdose.
- Joe Goddard, 86, Trinidadian sprinter (1956).
- Ron Hooker, 83, English cricketer (Middlesex, Buckinghamshire).
- Werner Ipta, 76, German footballer (FC Schalke 04, Bayern Munich, Hertha BSC).
- Slobodan Kuljanin, 65, Serbian-Bosnian footballer (Borac Banja Luka).
- James U. Lemke, 89, American physicist.
- Josephine Mandamin, 77, Canadian Anishinaabe water activist (Mother Earth Water Walk), pancreatic cancer.
- Kodi Ramakrishna, 69, Indian film director (Ankusam, Ammoru, Arundhati), lung infection.
- Yadollah Samareh, 82, Iranian linguist.
- Jeff Sitar, 57, American locksmith.
- Brody Stevens, 48, American comedian and actor (The Hangover, Chelsea Lately, Brody Stevens: Enjoy It!), suicide by hanging.
- Sun Wei, 83, Chinese civil engineer, member of the Academy of Engineering (since 2005).
- Robert Tine, 64, American author.
- Wang Yening, 92, Chinese physicist, member of the Academy of Sciences (since 1991).
- Morgan Woodward, 93, American actor (Cool Hand Luke, The Life and Legend of Wyatt Earp, Dallas), cancer.

=== 23 ===
- Bob Adams, 94, Canadian Olympic decathlete.
- Marella Agnelli, 91, Italian art collector and socialite.
- Roger Ainsworth, 67, British engineer, cancer.
- Stan Applebaum, 96, American musician, composer and arranger ("Save the Last Dance for Me", "Stand By Me", "Breaking Up Is Hard to Do").
- Ron Avery, 62, American sport shooter, cancer.
- Ko Channabasappa, 96, Indian writer.
- Douglas, 51, Brazilian-born Swedish scarlet macaw actor (Pippi in the South Seas).
- Nestor Espenilla, 60, Filipino banker, Governor of the Bangko Sentral (since 2017), cancer.
- Gillian Freeman, 89, British author (The Undergrowth of Literature) and screenwriter (The Leather Boys, That Cold Day in the Park).
- Ira Gitler, 90, American jazz historian and journalist.
- Brian Halton, 77, British-born New Zealand organic chemist and academic (Victoria University of Wellington).
- Katherine Helmond, 89, American actress (Soap, Who's the Boss?, Brazil), Golden Globe winner (1980, 1988), complications from Alzheimer's disease.
- Muhammad Tajammal Hussain, 53, Pakistani politician, member of the Provincial Assembly of the Punjab (2002–2018), heart attack.
- Natacha Jaitt, 41, Argentinian model, radio and television presenter.
- Ann Kendall, 80, British archaeologist.
- Johnnie Lovesin, 69, Canadian rock musician.
- Dorothy Masuka, 83, Zimbabwean-born South African jazz singer, complications from hypertension.
- Carl Meinhold, 92, American basketball player (Providence Steamrollers, Chicago Stags, Scranton Miners).
- Jill Morgenthaler, 64, American military officer and politician.
- Franziska Pigulla, 54, German voice actress.
- S. Rajendran, 62, Indian politician, MP (since 2014), traffic collision.
- Sebring, 13, Australian racehorse and sire, heart attack.
- Andrew Shapter, 52, American film director (Before the Music Dies, Happiness Is, The Teller and the Truth), cancer.
- Ricardo J. Vicent Museros, 80, Spanish printer and publisher.
- Shmuel Wolf, 85, Israeli actor (An American Hippie in Israel, Fifty-Fifty), multiple system atrophy.
- Boris Zhuravlyov, 72, Russian football player (Dynamo Stavropol, Lokomotiv Moscow) and manager (Laos national team).

=== 24 ===
- Paul Allaire, 80, American chief executive (Xerox).
- Raymond Bellot, 89, French footballer (Toulouse, Monaco, Stade Français).
- Paul Blackwell, 64, Australian actor (The Quiet Room, Dr. Plonk, 100 Bloody Acres), cancer.
- Ernst-Wolfgang Böckenförde, 88, German legal scholar.
- Ole Johs. Brunæs, 83, Norwegian politician, MP (1989–2001).
- Jack Casey, 83, American politician.
- Philip Cummins, 79, Australian jurist, Supreme Court judge (1988–2009), chair of the Victorian Law Reform Commission (since 2012).
- Subodh Das, 71, Indian politician, member of Tripura Legislative Assembly (1977–2018), Panchayet Minister of Tripura Government (1993–2004).
- Ian Eliason, 73, New Zealand rugby union player (Taranaki, national team).
- Susan J. Ellis, 70, American non-fiction writer, cancer.
- Trevor Eyton, 85, Canadian businessman and politician, Senator (1990–2009).
- Patricia Garwood, 78, British actress (The Lavender Hill Mob, Petticoat Pirates, No Place Like Home), non-Hodgkin lymphoma.
- Antoine Gizenga, 93, Congolese politician, Prime Minister (1960–1961, 2006–2008).
- Donald Keene, 96, American-born Japanese historian and writer, heart failure.
- T. Jack Lee, 83, American engineer, director of the NASA Marshall Space Flight Center (1989–1994), pancreatic cancer.
- Li Xueqin, 85, Chinese historian and palaeographer, Director of the Institute of History, Chinese Academy of Social Sciences.
- Carrie Ann Lucas, 47, American disability rights advocate and attorney, complications from septic shock.
- Nyandika Maiyoro, 88, Kenyan Olympic long-distance runner (1956, 1960), tuberculosis.
- Patrick McCarthy, 67, American fashion magazine publisher and editor (Women's Wear Daily).
- Arthur Pardee, 97, American biochemist.
- Johnny Romano, 84, American baseball player (Cleveland Indians, Chicago White Sox, St. Louis Cardinals).
- Dame Margaret Scott, 96, South African-Australian ballet dancer.
- Herbert Stuart, 95, British Anglican priest, RAF Chaplain-in-Chief (1980–1983).
- Richard S. Wheeler, 83, American writer and newspaper editor.
- Mac Wiseman, 93, American bluegrass musician (Foggy Mountain Boys).
- Lothar Zenetti, 93, German theologian and hymnist ("Segne dieses Kind").

=== 25 ===
- Janet Asimov, 92, American science fiction writer, psychiatrist, and psychoanalyst.
- Jack Burnham, 87, American writer and art historian.
- Chantal duPont, 76, Canadian artist.
- Peter Fox, 85, English rugby league player (Batley Bulldogs) and coach (Featherstone Rovers, Bradford Northern).
- Fred Gloden, 100, American football player (Philadelphia Eagles, Miami Seahawks).
- John Herron, 86, Australian politician and diplomat, Senator (1990–2002), Ambassador to Ireland and the Holy See (2003–2006).
- Mark Hollis, 64, English singer-songwriter (Talk Talk).
- Roland Leroy, 92, French journalist and politician.
- Waldo Machado, 84, Brazilian footballer (Fluminense, Valencia, national team).
- Graham Newton, 76, English football player (Walsall, Atlanta Chiefs) and manager (Worcester City).
- Paulo Nogueira Neto, 96, Brazilian environmentalist, Secretary of the Environment (1974–1986).
- Kathleen O'Malley, 94, American actress (My Old Dutch, Wagon Master).
- Kenneth Pitt, 96, British publicist and talent manager (David Bowie).
- Nikhil Sen, 87, Bangladeshi dramatist.
- Lisa Sheridan, 44, American actress (Invasion, FreakyLinks, Strange Nature), complications from chronic alcoholism.
- Oleksandr Tikhonov, 80, Ukrainian pharmacist.
- Agnes Ullmann, 91, French biochemist.
- Nelson Zeglio, 92, Brazilian footballer (Sochaux, CA Paris, Roubaix-Tourcoing).

=== 26 ===
- Andy Anderson, 68, English rock drummer (The Cure, The Glove, Steve Hillage), cancer.
- Aytaç Arman, 69, Turkish actor (The Enemy, Night Journey, Hunting Time), cancer.
- Christian Bach, 59, Argentine-Mexican actress (Bodas de odio, De pura sangre, El secreto), respiratory failure.
- Harry F. Barnes, 86, American senior judge of the District Court for the Western District of Arkansas.
- Mickey Channell, 76, American politician, member of the Georgia House of Representatives (1992–2015).
- Jayatilleke De Silva, 80, Sri Lankan author and journalist.
- Bobby Doyle, 65, Scottish footballer (Peterborough United, Portsmouth).
- Uday Bhanu Hans, 92, Indian poet.
- Mitzi Hoag, 86, American actress (We'll Get By).
- Tony Honoré, 96, British lawyer and jurist.
- Murv Jacob, 74, American artist.
- Magnus Lindberg, 66, Swedish musician, cancer.
- Charles McCarry, 88, American novelist, complications from cerebral hemorrhage.
- Ruge Mutahaba, 49, Tanzanian media executive.
- Ivar Nilsson, 85, Swedish Olympic speed skater (1960, 1964).
- Shirley Prendergast, 89, American theatre lighting designer.
- Grace Quintanilla, 51, Mexican art curator.
- Manakkal Rangarajan, 96, Indian classical vocalist.
- Dennis Richardson, 69, American politician, member of the Oregon House of Representatives (2003–2015) and Secretary of State (since 2017), brain cancer.
- Jeraldine Saunders, 95, American writer and astrologer, creator of The Love Boat, complications from kidney stone surgery.
- Thomas L. Shaffer, 84, American legal scholar.
- George Stade, 85, American literary scholar and novelist, pneumonia.
- Andrejs Žagars, 60, Latvian actor (Ilgais ceļš kāpās, The Life of Klim Samgin, Abduction of the Wizard).

=== 27 ===
- Rabindra Prasad Adhikari, 49, Nepalese politician, Minister of Culture, Tourism and Civil Aviation (since 2018), helicopter crash.
- César Borda, 25, Argentine footballer (Talleres, UAI Urquiza), suicide by hanging.
- Sandra Faire, Canadian television producer (Comedy Now!, The Holmes Show, Video Hits).
- Pierrette Fleutiaux, 77, French writer.
- Altaf Hussain, 76–77, Bangladeshi cricketer.
- Bill Landeryou, 77, Australian politician and trade unionist, member of the Victorian Legislative Council (1976–1992).
- Barrie Martin, 83, English footballer (Blackpool, Tranmere Rovers, Oldham Athletic).
- Dan Earl May, 66, American artist.
- António Mendes, 79, Portuguese footballer (Benfica, Vitória de Guimarães, national team).
- Jerry Merryman, 86, American electrical engineer, heart and kidney failure.
- Milton Morris, 94, Australian politician, NSW MP (1956–1980) and Minister for Transport (1965–1975), complications from a stroke.
- Buzwani Mothobi, 80, Zimbabwean diplomat, Ambassador to Japan and Korea, cancer.
- Henry Mundy, 100, English painter.
- Edward Nixon, 88, American business consultant and political campaigner (Richard Nixon 1968 presidential campaign).
- Giovanni Piana, 78, Italian philosopher.
- Bill Playle, 80, New Zealand cricketer (national team).
- Mike Rebhan, 51, American baseball player (Georgia Bulldogs), cancer.
- France-Albert René, 83, Seychellois politician, President (1977–2004) and Prime Minister (1976–1977), respiratory failure.
- Michel Sainte-Marie, 80, French politician, Mayor of Mérignac (1974–2014) and MP (1973–2012).
- Doug Sandom, 89, English drummer (The Who).
- Billy J. Smith, 73, Australian game show host (It's a Knockout), injuries sustained in a fall.
- Janine Tavernier, 83, Haitian poet and novelist.
- Nathaniel Taylor, 80, American actor (Sanford and Son, What's Happening!!, Trouble Man), heart attack.
- Ang Tshering Sherpa, 54, Nepali entrepreneur, founder of Air Dynasty and Yeti Airlines, helicopter crash.
- Willie Williams, 87, American athlete, 100 metres world record holder (1956).
- Joe Young, 85, American football player (Denver Broncos).

=== 28 ===
- Shah Alamgir, 62, Bangladeshi journalist, leukemia.
- Zdzisław Antczak, 71, Polish handball player, Olympic bronze medallist (1976).
- Lewis Aron, 66, American psychoanalyst.
- Xabier Arzalluz, 86, Spanish lawyer and academic, president of PNV (1980–1984, 1987–2004) and Deputy (1977–1980).
- María Ignacia Benítez, 60, Chilean politician.
- Ed Bickert, 86, Canadian jazz guitarist.
- Peter Dolby, 78, English footballer (Shrewsbury Town).
- Stephan Ellis, 69, American bassist (Survivor).
- Jim Fritsche, 87, American basketball player (Minneapolis Lakers, Baltimore Bullets, Fort Wayne Pistons).
- Joe Girard, 90, American salesman and author, injuries sustained in a fall.
- Ray Girardin, 84, American actor (Charlie & Co., Number One with a Bullet, Hollywood Man), complications from Alzheimer's disease.
- Lou Wills Hildreth, 90, American gospel singer and talent agent.
- Sarah Lee Lippincott, 98, American astronomer.
- Noel Mulcahy, 89, Irish politician, member of the Seanad Éireann (1977–1981).
- Norma Paulus, 85, American lawyer and politician, Oregon Secretary of State (1977–1985), complications from dementia.
- André Previn, 89, German-born American composer (Gigi, Elmer Gantry) and conductor (My Fair Lady), Oscar winner (1959, 1960, 1964, 1965).
- Stanley Price, 87, British novelist and playwright.
- Mervyn Rolfe, 71, Scottish politician.
- Bruce Rosier, 90, Australian Anglican prelate, Bishop of Willochra (1970–1987).
- William G. Schilling, 79, American actor (Head of the Class, In the Line of Fire, Space Jam).
- Ram Lal Singh, 90, Indian politician, MLA (1985–1990) and (1995–2000).
- Aron Tager, 84, American actor (Donkey Kong Country, X-Men, Serendipity).
- Elliot Griffin Thomas, 92, American Roman Catholic prelate, Bishop of Saint Thomas (1993–1999).
