= Chakladar =

- Language: Bengali

Origin
- Origin: Persian
- Derivation: Chakla
- Meaning: Possessor of a chakla
- Region of origin: Bengal

Other names
- Alternative spelling: Chaklader

Chakladar (Bengali: চাকলাদার), also spelt Chaklader, is a Bengali surname denoting the chief of a chakla.

== Notable people ==
- Awlad Hossain Chakladar (1950/51–2019), Bangladeshi freedom fighter, film producer and director
- Monotosh Chakladar (born 1998), Indian footballer
- Shahin Chakladar, Bangladeshi politician
- Sharif Uddin Chaklader, Bangladesh Supreme Court justice

== See also ==
- Saudagar (surname)
