= Rone (disambiguation) =

Rone is the nom de plume of Tyrone Wright, a street artist.

Rone may also refer to:

- Rone (musician), French music producer and artist, born Erwan Castex
- Rone, Gotland, a settlement in Sweden
- 8680 Rone, a main-belt asteroid
- Rone, a Scottish word for a rain gutter or its downpipe
- Adam Ferrone (Rone) (born 1988), battle rap champion under the stage-name Rone, and Barstool Sports podcaster

== People with the surname ==
- John Rone (1949–2019), American actor and theatre director

== See also ==
- Elling Rønes, Norwegian cross-country skier
