= Balayya (disambiguation) =

Balayya or Nandamuri Balakrishna (born 1960) is an Indian actor.

Balayya, Balaya or Balaiah may also refer to:

- Balaya, Guinea, a town
- Brahmanapalli Balaiah (1930–2019), Indian politician
- Mannava Balayya (1930–2022), Indian actor, writer and director in Telugu cinema
- T. S. Balaiah (1914–1972), Indian actor in Tamil cinema
