= James Hough (disambiguation) =

James Hough (born 1945), is a Scottish physicist. Other people with this name include:

- James Jackson Hough (1945–2019), American businessman and philanthropist
- Jim Hough (born 1956), American professional football player
- Séamus Ó hEocha (1880–1959), Irish educator born as James Hough
