= Mary Stearns =

Mary Stearns may refer to:

- Mary Kay Stearns (1925–2018), American actress
- Mary Beth Stearns (1925–2019), American solid-state physicist
