= Lou Wacker =

American gridiron football player (1934–2019)

Profile
- Positions: Halfback, defensive back

Personal information
- Born: May 13, 1934; Highland Springs, Virginia, U.S.
- Died: February 15, 2019 (aged 84); Emory, Virginia, U.S.
- Listed height: 5 ft 10 in (1.78 m)
- Listed weight: 185 lb (84 kg)

Career information
- College: Richmond

Career history
- 1956: Calgary Stampeders

Louis Wacker (May 13, 1934 – February 15, 2019) was an American gridiron football player and coach. He played professionally with the Calgary Stampeders of the Western Interprovincial Football Union–a forerunner of the Canadian Football League (CFL)—in 1956. Wacker served as the head football coach at Emory and Henry College in Emory, Virginia from 1982 to 2004, compiling a record of 164–76 and leading the Emory and Henry Wasps to 11 Old Dominion Athletic Conference titles. He was also the head men's lacrosse coach at Hampden–Sydney College in Hampden Sydney, Virginia for one season, in 1975 tallying a mark of 1–8.

== Head coaching record ==
=== Football ===
Year	Team	Overall	Conference	Standing	Bowl/playoffs
Emory and Henry Wasps (Old Dominion Athletic Conference) (1982–2004)
1982	Emory and Henry	3–6	2–3	T–4th	
1983	Emory and Henry	5–5	4–2	T–2nd	
1984	Emory and Henry	6–4	3–2	T–2nd	
1985	Emory and Henry	8–3	4–1	T–1st	
1986	Emory and Henry	10–2	5–0	1st	L NCAA Division III First Round
1987	Emory and Henry	11–3	4–1	2nd	L NCAA Division III Semifinal
1988	Emory and Henry	8–2	4–0	1st	
1989	Emory and Henry	6–4	3–1	2nd	
1990	Emory and Henry	6–4	4–0	1st	
1991	Emory and Henry	8–2	4–1	2nd	
1992	Emory and Henry	11–1	5–0	1st	L NCAA Division III Quarterfinal
1993	Emory and Henry	7–3	4–1	2nd	
1994	Emory and Henry	8–2	4–1	1st	
1995	Emory and Henry	9–2	5–0	1st	L NCAA Division III First Round
1996	Emory and Henry	8–2	4–1	1st	
1997	Emory and Henry	8–2	4–1	T–1st	
1998	Emory and Henry	10–0	5–0	1st	
1999	Emory and Henry	6–4	4–2	T–2nd	
2000	Emory and Henry	8–3	5–1	1st	L NCAA Division III First Round
2001	Emory and Henry	5–5	3–3	T–2nd	
2002	Emory and Henry	4–6	2–4	T–5th	
2003	Emory and Henry	5–5	3–3	T–3rd	
2004	Emory and Henry	4–6	3–3	4th	
Emory and Henry:		164–76	88–31		
Total:		164–76			
National championship Conference title Conference division title or championship game berth
