= Chakla (administrative division) =

Former administrative division in the Indian subcontinent

Chakla (Persian: چکله) was a district-level administrative division in Indian subcontinent during the Mughal period. The chakla system was used at least in Bengal and Awadh provinces. The chakla was the major administrative division in a subah (province). It was further subdivided into parganas; each pargana consisted of several villages.

== See also ==
- Administrative divisions of India
- Sarkar (administrative division)
