= Muhammad Khasru =

Bangladeshi journalist and activist (1946–2019)

- Born: 1946; Hooghly, West Bengal
- Died: 19 February 2019 (aged 72–73)
- Occupation(s): Writer, activist

Muhammad Khasru (1946 – 19 February 2019) was a Bangladeshi journalist and activist who pioneered the film society movement in the country. He played an important role in establishing the Federation of Film Societies of Bangladesh in 1973 and Bangladesh Film Archive in 1978.

== Early life ==
Khasru was born in 1946 at Hooghly district of West Bengal, India. His father worked at the Hooghly Jute Mill. But after the communal riots broke out in India, his family migrated to Dhaka in the 1950s. They settled in their ancestral home at Mohonpur village in Keraniganj Upazila of Dhaka district.

Works and writing: Bangladesher Cholochitro Songsod Andolon, Dhrupadi (an edited works).

== Award ==
- Lifetime achievement award of Dhaka University Film Society (2017)
