= Murv Jacob =

American artist and illustrator (1945–2019)

- Born: January 27, 1945; Glendale, Ohio
- Died: February 26, 2019 (aged 74); Tahlequah, Oklahoma
- Citizenship: (United States) American
- Website: www.jacobandduvall.com

Murv Jacob (January 27, 1945 - February 26, 2019) was an American artist and illustrator. He is known for his paintings illustrating the culture of Cherokee people and the landscape of the Southeastern United States.

== Early life ==
Jacob was born in Glendale, Ohio. Raised in eastern Kansas, he attended San Bernardino Valley College in California.

== Career ==
From 1965 to 1967 Jacob lived in San Francisco, where he made posters for artists such as Allen Ginsberg and the Grateful Dead. He returned to Kansas in 1971, and in 1984 moved to Tahlequah, Oklahoma, a center for the culture of the Cherokee Nation.

Jacob created oil and acrylic paintings portraying the old and modern Cherokee dances, and the villages, animals, landscapes and perhaps best known for his illustrations of the old Cherokee animal stories especially those about Ji-sdu the rabbit and Yona the bear.

In 2011, Jacob co-wrote and illustrated the book Secret History of the Cherokees

In 2015, Jacob was in the news when a neighbors insisted that he remove a graffiti-like painting which he had commissioned on the side wall of his studio fifteen years before.

Jacob died on February 26, 2019.

== Awards ==
Jacob won more than 50 awards, and has twice been voted Wordcraft Circle of Native Writers' Illustrator of the Year. In 2012, he won the Wordcraft Circle Award for Secret History of the Cherokees.

Jacob and his partner Debbie Duvall, who have collaborated on a dozen books, received the “Oklahoma Book Award” in 2005 for their seven book series “The Grandmother Stories”.

== Selected illustration credits ==
- Rabbit and the Well
- Rabbit and the Fingerbone Necklace
- Rabbit Goes to Kansas
- Rabbit Plants the Forest
- Rabbit and the Wolves
- Rabbit Goes Duck Hunting
- Rabbit and the Bears
- The Opossum's Tale
- How Rabbit Tricked Otter and Other Cherokee Trickster Stories
- How Rabbit Lost his Tail
- How Medicine Came to the People: a Tale of the Ancient Cherokees
- The Great Ball Game of the Birds and Animals, winner of the 2003 Oklahoma book awards
- Four Ancestors: Stories, Songs, and Poems from Native North America
- Tecumseh: Leader
- How Turtle‘s Back Was Cracked
- Boy Who Lived with the Bears and Other Iroquois Stories
- Rabbit and the Bears
- Dog People: Native Dog Stories
- Turtle Meat and Other Stories
- Circle of Thanks
- Flying with the Eagle, Racing the Great Bear
- The Legend of the Windigo
- The Dark Island
- The Long Way Home
- The Dark Way
- Mountain Windsong
- Cherokee Dragon
- The Way of the Priests
- War Woman
- The Peace Chief
- The War Trail North
- The Way South
- Ezekiel's Wheels
- The Education of Little Tree
- Pushing the Bear
- Designs of the Night Sky
- Mankiller: A Chief and her people
- Tribes of the Southern Woodlands
