= Slobodan Peladić =

Serbian painter, sculptor, and multimedia artist (1962–2019)

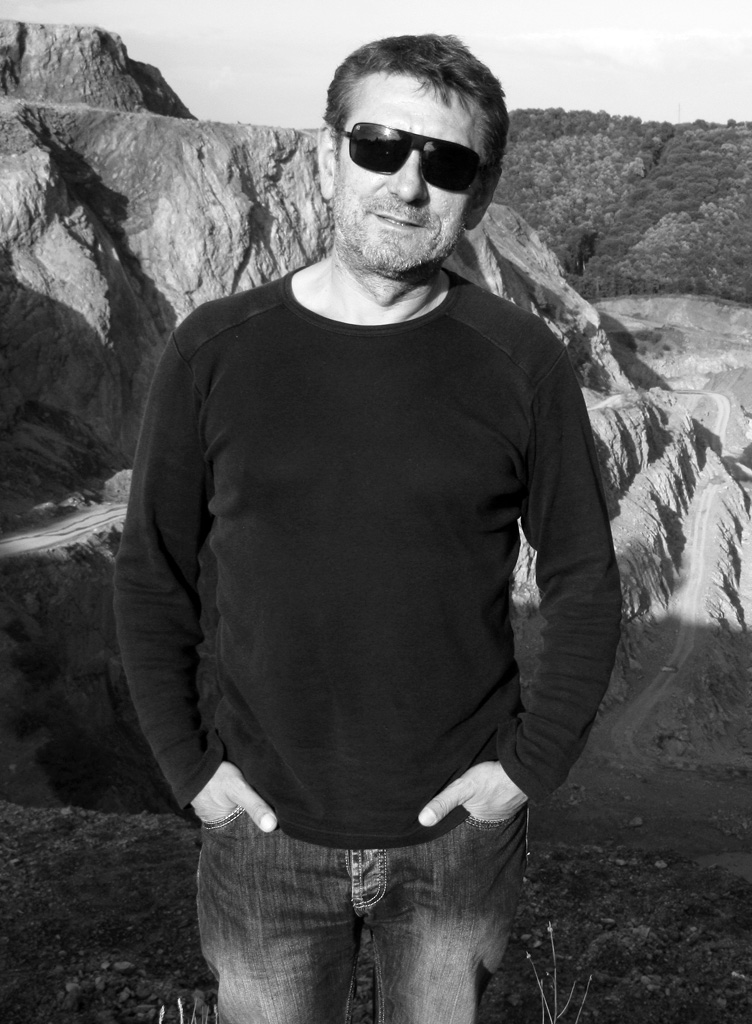
- Slobodan Peladić
- Born: 8 February 1962; Šabac, PR Serbia, FPR Yugoslavia (now Republic of Serbia)
- Died: 2 February 2019 (aged 56)
- Known for: Multimedia artist, painter, sculptor, photographer
- Spouse: TKP
- Website: Official website

Slobodan Peladić (Serbian Cyrillic: Слободан Пеладић; Serbian pronunciation: [slobodan peladitɕ]; 8 February 1962 – 2 February 2019) was a Serbian painter, sculptor and multimedia artist.

== Biography ==
He was born in Šabac (Yugoslavia, now Serbia) and studied painting (1983–1987) and received his degree in 1987 from the Academy of Arts in Novi Sad in the class of professor Jovan Rakidžić.

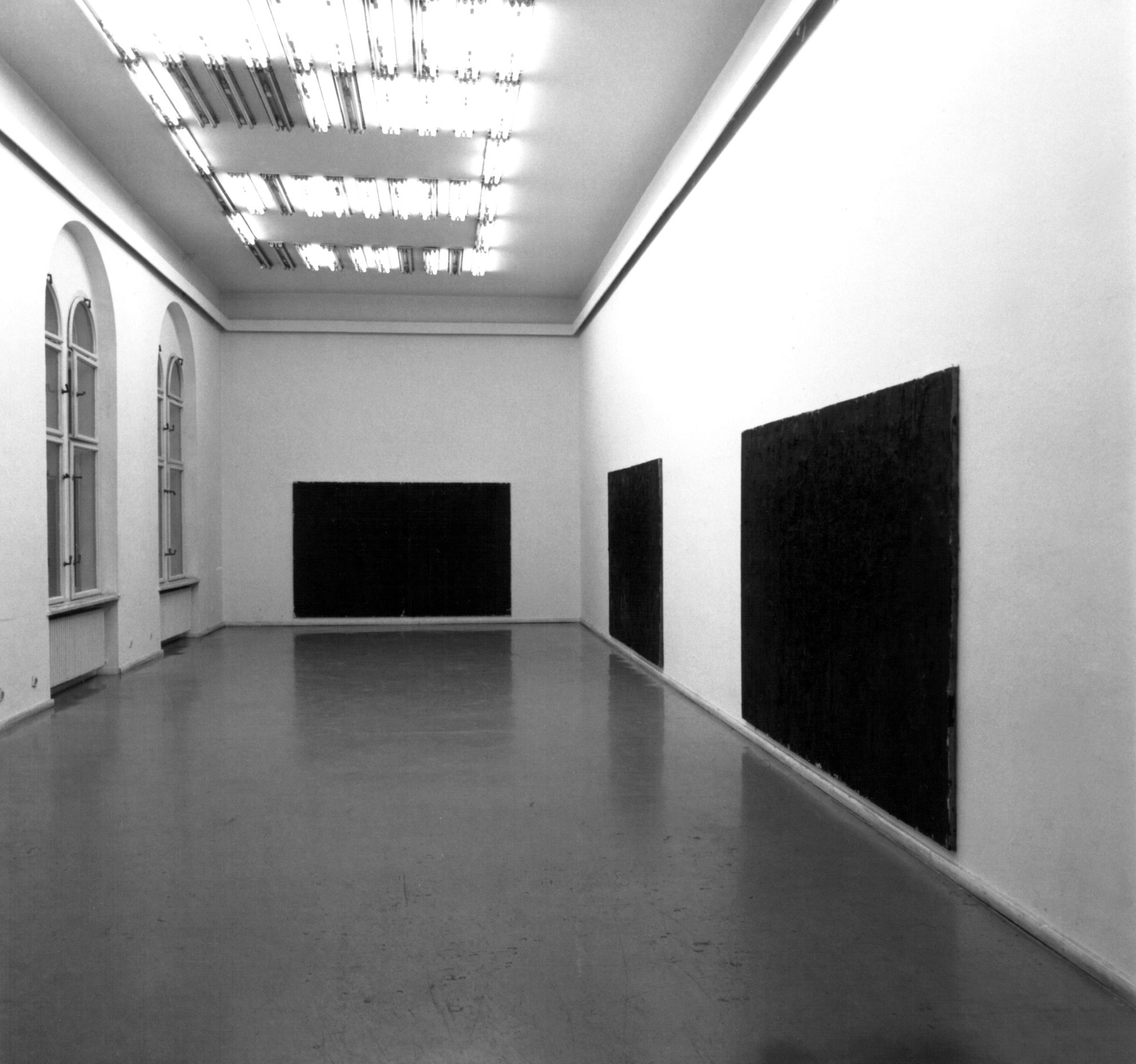
Gallery of SKC Belgrade (Serbia), Peladić Exhibition, 1989

He worked at the School of Art Crafts in Šabac from 1994 to 2000. He was founder of Independent Artistic Association Kolektiv and director of The Association of Fine Artists of Šabac since 2000. His artworks can be found in private collections and in the Museum of Contemporary Art in Belgrade and Museum of Contemporary Art Vojvodina in Novi Sad and his name in several books on Modern Art.

He died in Belgrade, Serbia, on 2 February 2019 after a short and severe illness.

== Exhibitions ==
On several occasions, he exhibited his works at personal (Belgrade, Šabac, Zagreb, Ljubljana, Rijeka, Subotica, Novi Sad) and group exhibitions in the country and abroad, among which the following ones deserve to be singled out: Controlled Gestures, displayed in Koprivnica, Ljubljana, Maribor, Subotica, Sarajevo and Rijeka, in 1988, Yugoslav Documents displayed in Sarajevo, 15th Yugoslav Youth Biennial in Rijeka and Meeting of Differences – Art at the end of the 80's, (in Zenica in 1989), Innovations in the Painting of the Eighties (Zadar, 1990), Kunst Europa (Siegen, Germany 1991), 1st Yugoslav Youth Arts Biennial, (Vršac, 1994), 1st International Biennial of Sketches and Projects (Novi Sad, 1997), Transgressor Forms (Vršac, 1998), Syntaxes of Deaths (Belgrade, 2001), and Konkordija – Ten years after (Belgrade, 2004), JLK (Belgrade, 2005), 50th October Salon (Šabac, 2006); next exhibitions The Policies of The Other (Šabac), and DoDai (Ljubljana, Slovenia, 2008), Trajković Collection and Vujičić Collection (Belgrade and Novi Sad, 2010), 20th Century Serbian History of Art (Šabac, 2011), The Personal Escort Trajković Collection (Belgrade, 2012), Praise of Fully (Šabac, 2015) and The Legacy of 1989/ Case study: the second Yugoslav Documents, (Ljubljana, Slovenia, 2017)

== Gallery ==
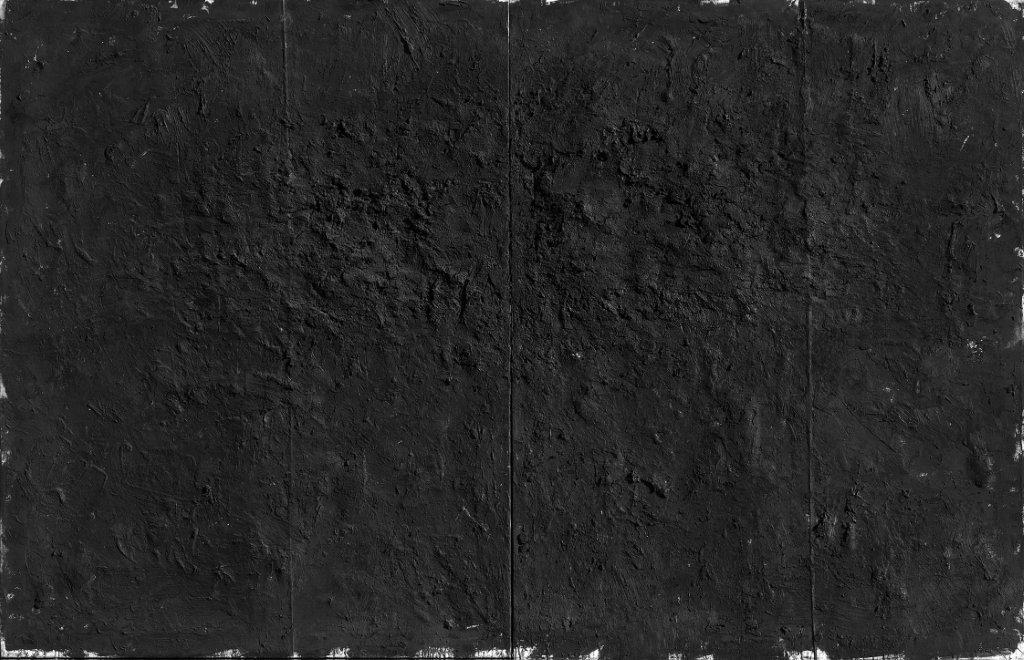
Without Without Title, 1989, oil on canvas, dimensions (H × W): 200 × 320 cm, Collection Trajković (Belgrade, Serbia)

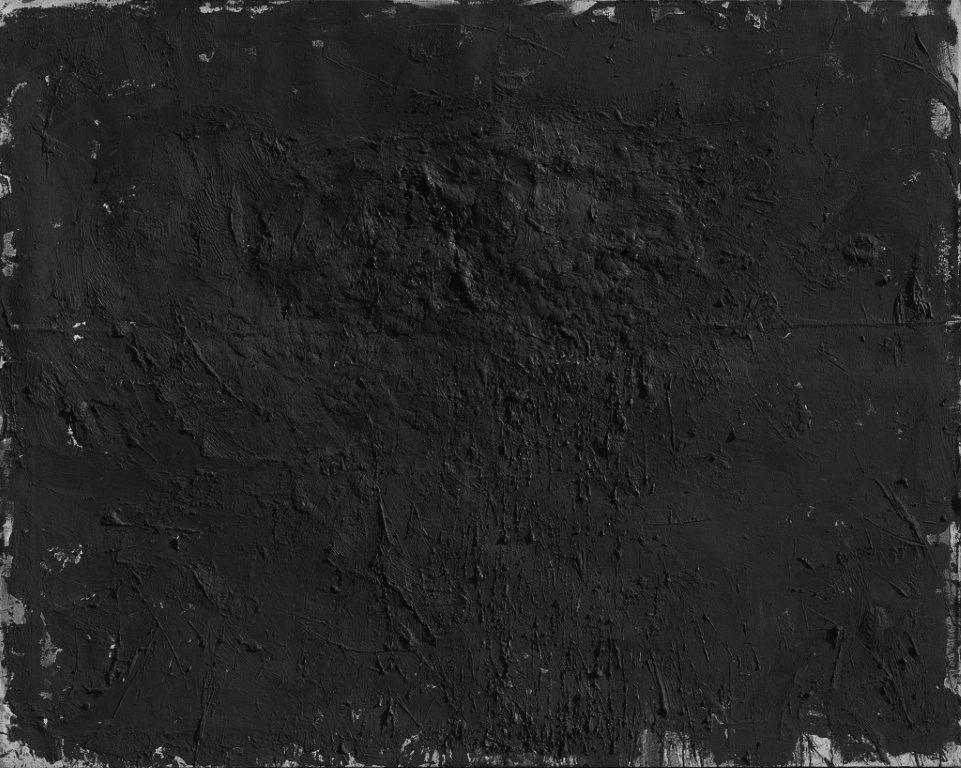
Without Without Title, 1990, oil on canvas, 200 × 160 cm, Collection Trajković (Belgrade, Serbia)

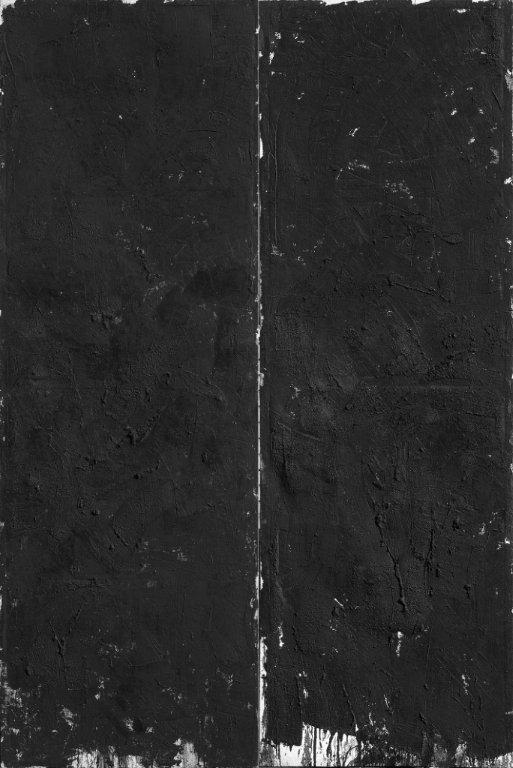
Without Without Title, 1991, oil on canvas, 200 × 300 cm, Collection Trajković (Belgrade, Serbia)

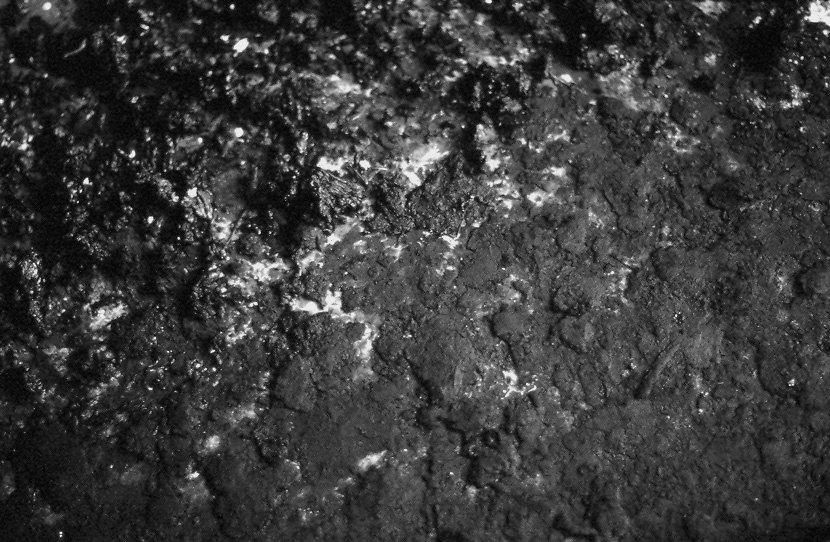
Without Without Title, detail of picture

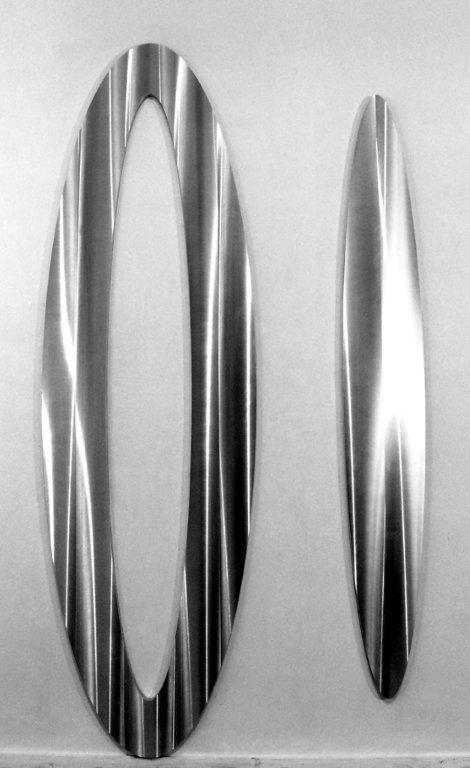
Double Ellipse of Full and Empty Form, 1997, aluminum, dimensions: 3300 × 975 × 38 mm/180 kg. 2780 × 367 × 38 mm/120 kg, collection: Museum of Contemporary Art, Belgrade, Serbia

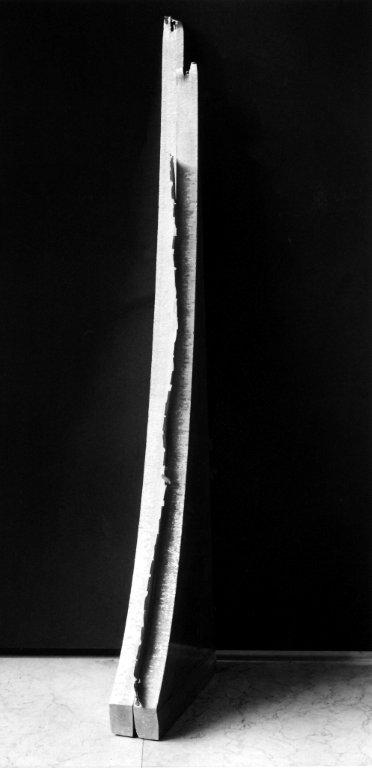
Corner Sculpture, 1997, Aluminium, 1400 × 500 × 80 mm, 50 kg

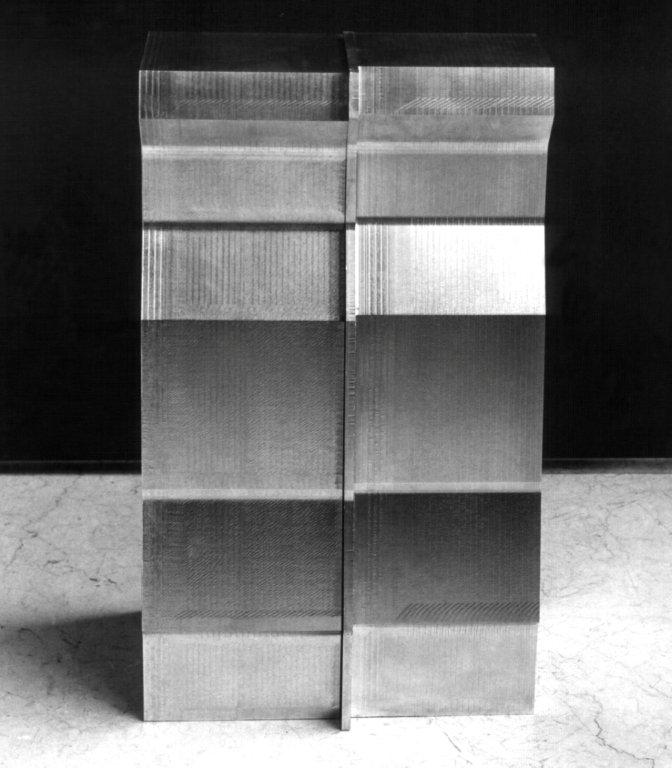
Span, 1998, Duralumin, 755 × 450 × 205 mm, 87 kg, Milan Marović Collection (Šabac, Serbia)

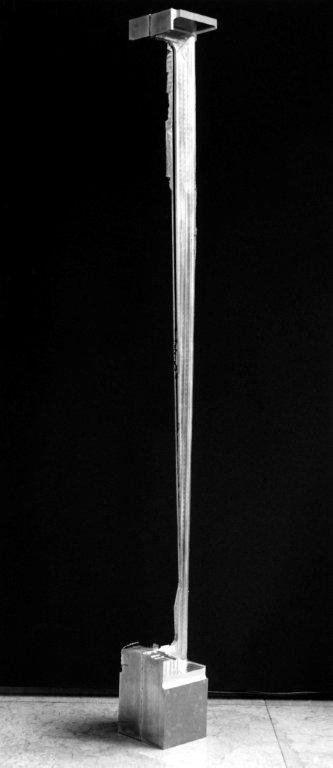
Ready – Made, 1998, duralumin, 1500 × 120 × 150 mm, Collection Publikum Printing House (Belgrade, Serbia)

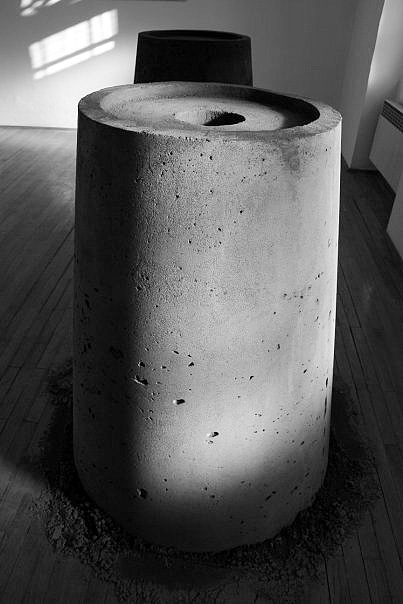
Two Summer Days, 2008, sand, dimensions: 1300 × 1000 × 1000 mm
