= David Sopher =

Indian water polo player (1929–2019)

Personal information
- Nationality: Indian
- Born: 1 February 1929 Mumbai
- Died: 14 February 2019 (aged 90)

Sport
- Sport: Water polo

David Sopher (1 February 1929 – 14 February 2019) was an Indian water polo player. He competed in the men's tournament at the 1952 Summer Olympics.
