= Kermit Eady =

American activist and social worker (1940–2019)

- Born: January 13, 1940; St. Stephen, South Carolina, US
- Died: February 4, 2019 (aged 79); Bradenton, Florida
- Education: Morgan State University
- Occupation(s): Non-profit CEO, educator
- Website: www.kermiteady.net

Kermit Eady (January 13, 1940 – February 4, 2019) was an American social worker, educator, motivational speaker, activist, and the co-founder of The Black United Fund of New York.

== Early life and education ==
Kermit was born in St. Stephen, South Carolina. He was the youngest of nine children. He attended Saint Stephen's public school system. His family moved to Jamaica, Queens, New York City, where he attended John Adams High School. His family attended Saint Mark A.M.E. Church in East Elmhurst, Queens.

Eady received a B.A. degree from Morgan State University in Baltimore, Maryland. He received a master's degree in social work from New York University. He was an assistant professor at Medgar Evers College in Brooklyn, New York. He also served as director of admissions and recruitment for Norfolk State University Graduate School of Social Work.

== Career ==
In 1979, Kermit Eady and Larry Barton founded the Black United Fund of New York (BUFNY), a non-profit organization for African-American and minority communities to development self-help, empowerment, development and financial resources, with $8,000 in capital. As president and CEO of BUFNY, Eady was able to attain workplace charitable solicitation through participation in corporate payroll deduction systems the Combined Federal Campaign (CFC). The CFC is a workplace-giving program that collects donations payroll deductions by the United States Federal government program authorized by President Ronald Reagan on March 23, 1982. Through this program, BUFNY was able to obtain contributions from the Freedom National Bank, Bell Laboratories, I.B.M. New York Telephone Company. Under Eady's leadership, the CFC helped to grow BUFNY from the initially $8,000 to $15 million by 2013 and developed more than 400 affordable housing in New York City.

In 2003, BUFNY purchased a radio station that broadcast the BUFNY-produced show The Empowerment Hour, which was hosted by Eady.

== Controversy ==
In 2002, Attorney General of New York State Eliot Spitzer started an investigation of BUFNY, citing the non-profit's shift in focus to housing and land development without notifying its donors. Spitzer named an interim board, which voted to remove Eady from his position as president in 2003, citing "a fundamental, profound, philosophical difference" in the way that Eady fundraised contributions.
