= Harry Hon Hai Wong =

- 王汉熙 (Chinese Name)
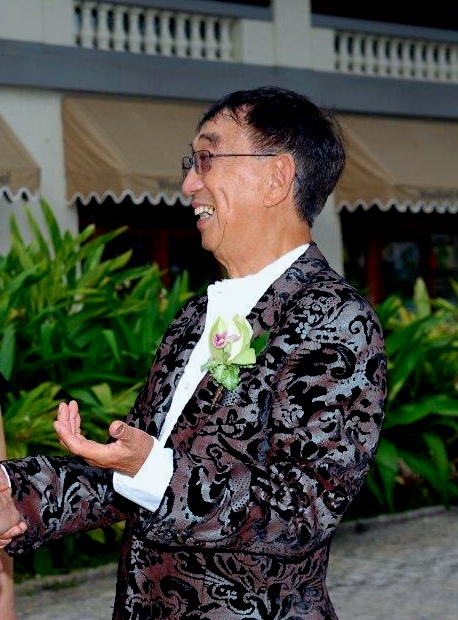
- Born: 13 January 1923; Kulangsu, Fujian Province
- Died: 12 February 2019 (aged 96); Burnaby, British Columbia, Canada
- Other name: Wang Han Xi (Chinese Name - Pinyin)
- Education: Saint John's University, Shanghai - Chemistry Major

Notes
- Interests are traveling, ballroom dancing, Tai Chi.

Harry Hong Hai Wong (王汉熙) was born January 13, 1923, in Gulangyu Island (Gulangsu) by the coast of Xiamen, Fujian Province in southern China. Wong was the founder of Winner Food Products Ltd, and called the "Noodle King" for inventing the first instant noodles. He standardised and simplified processes in Chinese food manufacture. Wong died in February 2019, aged 96.

== Early life and education ==
Born on January 13, 1923, Harry Hong Hai Wong (王汉熙) grew up in Gulangyu Island (Gulangsu) by the coast of Xiamen, Fujian Province. At the age of 14, he and his family moved to Hong Kong to avoid the Second Sino-Japanese War (1937-1945). In 1941, Wong started a degree in chemistry at St. John's University Shanghai. After his first year in Shanghai, he was forced to stop studying due to the war between China and Japan. In 1946 he resumed his education at St. John's, and finished his degree after 3 years. After graduation, Wong returned to Hong Kong to work for his father's company at Amoy Canning.

== Inventions and innovation ==
Work Experience
- Company: Position
Amoy Canning	Research and Development – 4 years
Union Carbide	Marketing Manager – 3 years
Sui Hing Department Stores	Manager
Consultant to	Lee Ka Shing (Welcome Stores); Mars; Coca-Cola

=== Manufacture of filled pastry rolls ===
A filled pastry roll is made from a continuously supplied strip of pastry by apparatus in which a conveyor conveys the pastry through a sequence of treatment stations. A receiving station includes a cutter which cuts a square of pastry from the leading end of the strip. A feeding station includes means for feeding a filling onto the square. A first folding station includes a movable deflector which folds one corner of the square over the filling. A second folding station includes a pair of opposed deflectors which fold the two adjacent corners inwards in succession, so that they overlap. A rolling station includes two parallel platforms between which the folded pastry is rolled by relative reciprocation of the platforms.

=== Intensive cultivation ===
Apparatus providing a controlled environment for intensive cultivation of vegetable matter, e.g. bean sprouts. A valve regulates the supply of water from a reservoir to a water-spray inlet in the roof of a cultivation chamber having an air vent and a water drainage outlet. A timing device, operatively connected to a valve actuating mechanism, opens the valve for a predetermined length of time at predetermined intervals. The water supplied to the spray inlet is heated by a thermostatically controlled heater. The chamber may be thermally insulated and its interior may be heated by a thermostatically controlled heater.

=== Apparatus for preparing pastry ===
A cylindrical drum and a roller are mounted for rotation with their respective axes horizontal. The periphery of the roller is adjacent to that of the drum and has one or more recesses of constant depth. The drum and the roller are rotated at the same peripheral speed. A farinaceous paste, supplied to the periphery of the roller in a zone remote from the drum, is repeatedly taken up by the recess or recesses and is transferred to the drum in the form of portions, which may be interconnected. The paste on the drum is heated, so that it is at least partially cooked to pastry, and the pastry is removed from the drum.

=== Other inventions ===
1. Spring roll manufacturing machine
2. Bean sprout growing machine
3. First frozen dim sum
4. First major Chinese instant noodles
5. First manufactured Chinese medicine pills and drinks
