= Bashir-ud-din Farooqi =

Former Grand Mufti of Jammu and Kashmir

Mufti-e-Azam Bashir-ud-din Farooqi

Grand Mufti of Jammu and Kashmir.
- In office 1960 – 8 July 2012
- Preceded by: Sheikh ul Islam Mufti Azam Qawam-ud-Din
- Succeeded by: Nasir ul Islam

Personal details
- Born: 1934
- Died: 12 February 2019 (aged 84–85)
- Education: Aligarh Muslim University

Mufti Bashir-ud-din Farooqi (also known as Mufti Bashiruddin Ahmad) (1934 – 12 February 2019) was an Indian Muslim scholar and jurist who served as Grand Mufti of Jammu and Kashmir from 1960 to 2012.

== Biography ==
Farooqi was born in 1934 and acquired his primary education in Srinagar. He received an LLB and masters degree in Arabic from Aligarh Muslim University. In 1960, he succeeded his father, Sheikh-ul-Islam Mufti Mohammad Qawam-ud-Din as the grand mufti of Jammu and Kashmir.

Mufti Bashir-ud-Din served as the Chief Justice of the Supreme Court of Islamic Shariat (Central Dar ul Fatwa), which operated as a parallel judicial system for over three decades.

In 2007, the Mufti criticized British government, when it addressed Salman Rushdie with the title of "Sir." The mufti said that Rushdie was an apostate and this title was part of a broader conspiracy against Islam. In 2013, he faced a severe backlash after he issued a fatwa against all-girl rock bands in Kashmir. The Mufti had asked girls to stay away from music, and regarded it as impermissible.

Farooqi had nominated his son Nasir ul Islam for the position on 8 July 2012 who succeeded him as the Grand Mufti of Jammu and Kashmir.

He died on 12 February 2019. His death was condoled by Satya Pal Malik, Omar Abdullah and Mehbooba Mufti.
