= Ann Kendall =

British archaeologist (1939–2019)

Elizabeth Ann Fenella Kendall OBE (6 January 1939 – 23 February 2019) was a British archaeologist who helped restore the Inca irrigation system in Peru.

== Biography ==
She grew up in Brazil and later moved to England for academic purposes. She originally studied at the Central School of Art in London, then later went on to pursue an MA in Interdisciplinary Studies at the UCLA. She received her Phd at the Institute of Archaeology at University College London. As an honorary research associate, she founded the Cusichaca Archaeological Project (CAP) in 1977. This project allowed for research on landscapes and reviving irrigation systems in place in the Peruvian Andes. Creating one of the biggest projects in the area, she became a pioneering archaeologist.

Establishing the Cusichaca Trust in 1977, Anne Kendall worked actively as both the founder of the trust and director for 40 years. The trust led to projects other than the CAP despite initially focusing on a select few areas throughout Peru. Additionally, the trust focused on rural development with particular attention paid to agricultural systems. Not only focusing on archaeology, the Cusichaca Trust helped to work on excavations and other projects including canal and terrace restoration and ethnography. The trust played a major role in reconstructing and helping to create basic services to the communities in which the sites were. The projects involved were engaged by and focused on the community all while incorporating different fields such as rural development and botany. There is an archive currently being created that will digitally incorporate unpublished works from both the Cusichaca Archaeological Project and from the Cusichaca Trust to be integrated within the Senate House Library.

She died in Spain, where she had moved, at the age of 80. Before moving, she had retired in the UK and lived there with her husband.

=== Education ===
- 1963; Central School of Art in London
- 1970; MA at UCLA
- PhD at the Institute of Archaeology at University College London

=== Awards and recognitions ===
- 1980; Order of Merit by the Peruvian Government
- 1994; OBE as result of work involving CAP

== Publications ==
- Toward a definition of music : relation and meaning in music, 1963
- Everyday Life of the Incas : drawings and photographs by the author, 1973
- Inca architecture and planning at the Inca sites in the Cusichaca area (microfilm)., 1974
- Architecture and planning at the Inca sites in the Cusichaca area, 1974
- Aspects of Inca architecture, 1974
- De Inca's, 1975
- Descripción e inventario de las formas arquitéctónicas inca : patrones de distribución e inferencias cronológicas, 1976
- Archaeological research in the lower Urubamba : the Cusichaca Project : problems and evaluation of archaeological procedure, 1976
- Current archaeological projects in the Central Andes : some approaches and results, 1984
- Aspects of Inca architecture, 1985
- The Patacancha project : a new 5-year research project in the Central Andes of Peru, 1988
- Everyday life of the Incas, 1989
- Los patrones de asentamiento y desarrollo rural prehispánico entre Ollantaytambo y Machu Picchu., 1991
- Infraestructura agrícola e hidráulica pre-hispánica : presente y futuro, 1992
- Proyecto arqueológico Cusichaca, Cusco : investigaciones arqueológicas y de rehabilitación agrícola, 1994
- Jean-Pierre Protzen, Inca arquitecture and construction at Ollantambo ..., 1994
- Restauración de sistemas agrícolas prehispánicos en la Sierra Sur, Perú, 1997
- The restoration of Pre-Hispanic agricultural systems : archaeology and indigenous technology and rural development, 1997
- Traditional technology emphasized in a model for Andean rural development., 1997
- Irrigando el futuro : manual para la restauración de sistemas de irrigación prehispánicos en la Sierra Sur, Perú, 1997
- Restauración de andenes prehispánicos en la Sierra Sur del Perú : adaptación de tecnología en zonas sísmicas semiáridas, 2001
