= Thomas R. Kane =

- Born: March 23, 1924; Vienna, Austria
- Died: February 16, 2019 (aged 94); Stanford, California, US
- Education: Columbia University (BS Mathematics and Civil Engineering; MS Civil Engineering; PhD Applied Mechanics)
- Awards: D'Alembert Award (2005)
- Scientific career
- Fields: Applied mechanics
- Workplaces: Stanford University
- Notable students: Peter Likins

Thomas Reif Kane (March 23, 1924 – February 16, 2019) was a professor emeritus of applied mechanics at Stanford University.

== Early life ==
Kane was born in Vienna, Austria. He immigrated to the United States with his parents in 1938 after Austria fell to Nazi Germany. In 1943, he enlisted in the United States Army and was stationed in the South Pacific as a combat photographer. From 1946 to 1953 he attended Columbia University during which he earned two BS degrees in mathematics and civil engineering, as well as an MS in civil engineering and a PhD in applied mechanics.

== Career ==
In 1953, Dr. Kane joined the engineering faculty at the University of Pennsylvania as an assistant professor of mechanical engineering and three years later was promoted to associate professor. While at Penn, he served as a research engineer and on the committee whose focus was investigating the question of sabbatical leave.

In the 1960s, Kane devised a method for formulating equations of motion for complex mechanical systems that requires less labor and leads to simpler equations than the classical approaches, while avoiding the vagueness of virtual quantities. The method is based on the use of partial angular velocities and partial velocities.
