= Eulade Rudahunga =

- Padre, Monsignor
- Born: 1921-22; Ngoma, Gitarama, Rwanda
- Died: February 11, 2019; Butare
- Burial: Butare
- Father: Tutuba Wa Kananga
- Mother: Nyirubuyanja

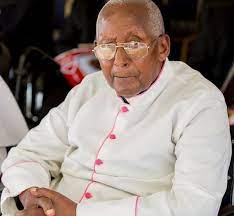

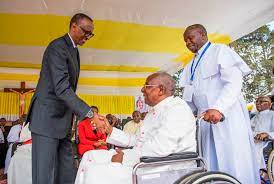

Eulade Rudahunga was a Rwandan priest for the Roman Catholic Diocese of Butare in the Republic of Rwanda from August 2, 1953, to 2019. He was a chaplain for different parishes until he received the title of Monsignor from Pope John Paul II.

Rudahunga attended Kabgayi and Nyakibanda seminaries before receiving the ecclesiastical title of Padre.

He worked as a teacher and taught Juvénal Habyarimana, a president of Rwanda.

Rudahunga was a survivor of the 1994 genocide against the Tutsi.
