= Michael Killisch-Horn =

Austrian politician (died 2019)

Michael Killisch-Horn (died 16 February 2019) was an Austrian politician who served as a Member of Parliament between 1986 and 1990.
