= Lionel Upton =

Australian rules footballer (1924–2019)

Personal information
- Full name: Lionel Charles Upton
- Born: 3 October 1924
- Died: 21 February 2019 (aged 94)
- Original team: Brunswick
- Height: 168 cm (5 ft 6 in)
- Weight: 70 kg (154 lb)

Playing career^{1}
Years	Club	Games (Goals)
1948	North Melbourne	5 (1)
- ^{1} Playing statistics correct to the end of 1948.

Lionel Charles Upton (3 October 1924 – 21 February 2019) was an Australian rules footballer who played with North Melbourne in the Victorian Football League (VFL).
