= Mohan Singh Bundela =

Indian politician (died 2019)

MLA of Dhar
- In office 1985–1990
- Preceded by: Vikram Verma
- Succeeded by: Vikram Verma

Personal details
- Born: 1944/45
- Died: 13 February 2019
- Party: Indian National Congress

Mohan Singh Bundela was an Indian politician belonging to Indian National Congress. He was elected as a member of Madhya Pradesh Legislative Assembly from Dhar in 1985. He died on 13 February 2019 at the age of 74.
