= Harold Mendelsohn =

American social psychologist (1923–2019)

Harold Mendelsohn (October 30, 1923 - February 4, 2019) was an American social psychologist who taught in the Mass Communications Department at the University of Denver from 1962 to 1988. During his tenure he also held a number of administrative positions in the University. He served as Chairman of the Mass Communications Department from 1970 to 1978, Dean of the Social Sciences Faculty beginning in 1984, and was Director of the University's Center for Mass Communications Research and Policy (formerly the Communication Arts Center) from 1962 to 1983.

== Career ==
Mendelsohn was born in Jersey City, New Jersey in 1923, the son of Louis and Bessie (née Yulinsky) Mendelsohn. He received his doctorate in 1956 from the New School for Social Research, where he majored in sociology and psychology. He completed his master's work at Columbia University in 1946 where he worked under Paul Lazarsfeld, concentrating in sociology and mass communications.

Mendelsohn did his undergraduate work at the City College of New York, where he received his B.S. in sociology with a minor in psychology in 1945. From 1958 to 1962 he was an associate director of the Psychological Corporation. He was Associate Manager of Marketing Communications Research for the advertising firm of McCann-Erickson, Inc., from 1952 to 1958, and a research associate at the Bureau of Social Science Research, the American University, Washington, D.C., from 1952 to 1956. Before going to the American University, he served as a senior survey analyst with the International Broadcasting Service of the U.S. Department of State (1950-1952); a study director with the Department of Scientific Research of the American Jewish Committee where, among other research projects, he worked on the Authoritarian Personality study and on the Research in Contemporary Cultures project with Margaret Mead (1947-1950), and as a research fellow, Department of Sociology, City College of New York (1946-1947). His research activity has focused mainly on social relations; attitudes and public opinion formation and change; communications; public health; and the sociology of politics. He was a frequent contributor to social research journals, publishing over 50 articles and authoring four books. In 1966, he published Mass Entertainment, in which he argued for the existence and study of mass media. He frequently lectured at conferences and seminars, and was elected to give the annual University Lecture at the University of Denver in 1968. He also served on numerous boards, commissions and governmental committees.

== The Mendelsohn Collection ==
The Mendelsohn Collection at the University of Denver. consists primarily of reports, speeches and publications authored by Mendelsohn. The collection reflects his long and varied academic career, in which he explored the intersection of mass communications with a number of societal issues, including public health, safety, the voting process, political campaigns, and racial integration. Also included in the collection are materials from conferences Mendelsohn attended, and notes from his research, publications and presentations. His papers also include correspondence, typescripts, journal articles, newspaper clippings, programs, and press releases.
