= Monjur Ahmed Bacchu Mia =

Bangladeshi politician (died 2019)

- মঞ্জুর আহমেদ বাচ্চু মিয়া

Member of Parliament for Mymensingh-31
- In office 7 April 1973 – 6 November 1975
- Preceded by: Position established
- Succeeded by: Position dissolved

Personal details
- Died: 17 February 2019 (aged 84) Dhaka, Bangladesh
- Party: Bangladesh Awami League
- Occupation: Politician

Monjur Ahmed Bacchu Mia (died on 17 February 2019) was a Bangladeshi politician in the 'Bangladeshi Awami League'. In 1970, he was elected as an MP. He was a freedom fighter. He served as a Jatiya Sangsad member for the now-defunct Mymensingh-31 constituency in 1972–1973.
