= Jan Hermansson =

Swedish aikidoka (1942–2019)

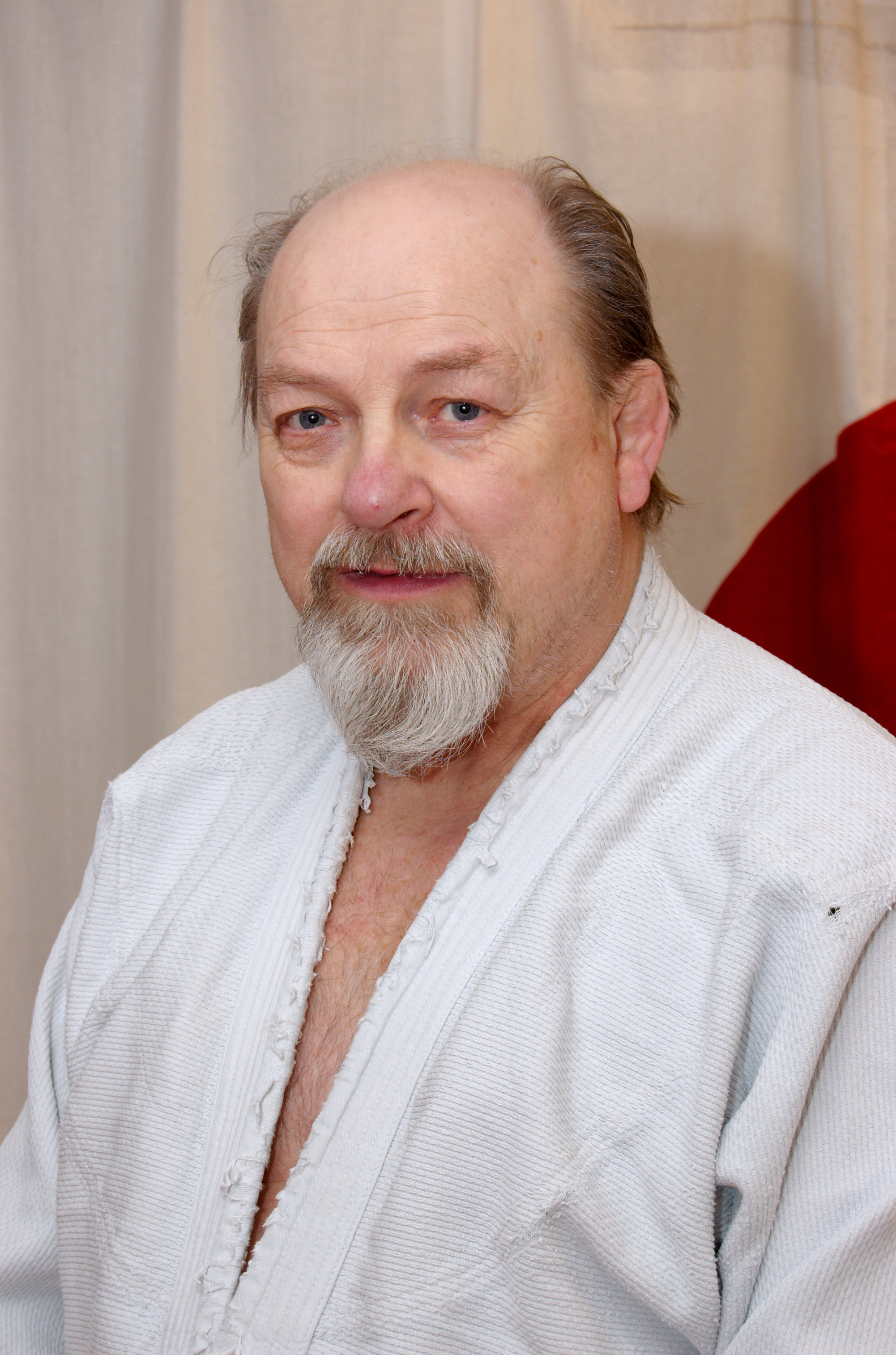

Jan Hermansson (15 March 1942 – 18 February 2019) was one of the first aikido pioneers in Sweden, and a respected aikido practitioner in the country. His rank was 7th dan shihan in the aikido organisation Aikikai.

Hermansson's first experience in budo, Japanese martial arts, was in his home town Stockholm in 1959, when he started taking judo classes for Gerhard Gosen, an immigrant from the Netherlands who at the time was important in spreading budo training in Stockholm. Gosen found a book about aikido in France. Guided by the book and by French aikido tapes where Minoru Mochizuki showed his aikido, Gosen and Hermansson started experimenting with aikido techniques in 1961 (first class February 6, 1961) which counts as the beginning of aikido in Sweden. Naturally, they got a couple of things wrong. For instance, they mistook the wide dark hakama, wide pleated trousers that often are worn in addition to the typical white budo keikogi, for a skirt. Hermansson asked his mother to make one for him, but it split during an aikido demonstration that Hermansson held. Gosen and Hermansson also went to France, to practise aikido for Tadashi Abe.

In 1965 Hermansson moved to Tokyo in Japan, to practise aikido at the Aikikai hombu dojo. To make a living, he did everything from window cleaning to show wrestling. At Hombu he eventually got awarded 4th dan, a rank not common among westerners in those days and hence the nickname "Janne Yondan" that he wore in Japan. ("Janne" is a common form of Jan, and yondan means fourth dan.) Of the teachers at Hombu dojo, Sadateru Arikawa has been pointed out as a major influence on Hermansson's aikido. Upon returning to Sweden in 1980, Hermansson started training and teaching at a dojo in the southern suburbs of Stockholm, Farsta aikidoklubb.

Since 1994, Hermansson is an honorary member in the grading committee of the Swedish Aikikai. In 1995, he was awarded 6th dan; it took many years for another Swede to receive the same rank. He was given 7th dan in 2006.

When Hombu in 1998 granted Swedish aikido the right to give dan ranks without a Japanese shihan present, it can be assumed that Hermansson's name in the grading committee was an important factor. When Hombu dojo for the first time officially gave out the title "shihan" to seven non-Japanese (around 2002), Hermansson was one of the recipients. Since Farsta aikidoklubb closed down in 2003, Hermansson no longer taught regularly. He suffered from a worn-out hip joint, partly eased by surgery. Although the result hampered his physical mobility, he still taught at seminars and could else be found training at the aikido dojo Iyasaka in Stockholm.

Among Hermansson anecdotes, apart from the "skirt" event, his holding out one of the people training at Hombu dojo, known for being cruel to beginners, from a window asking "Hard or soft?" is legendary.

== Photos ==
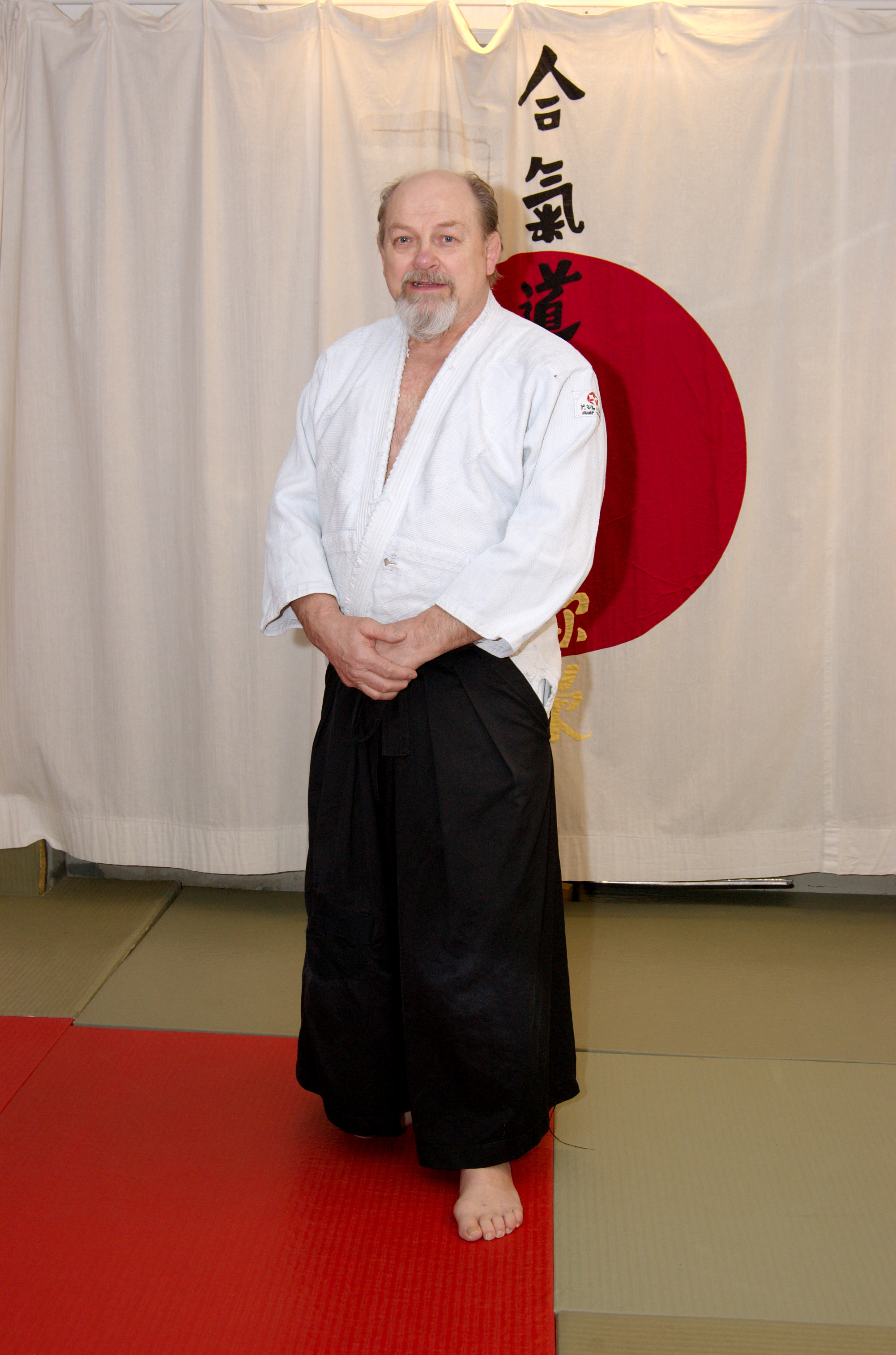
Jan Hermansson

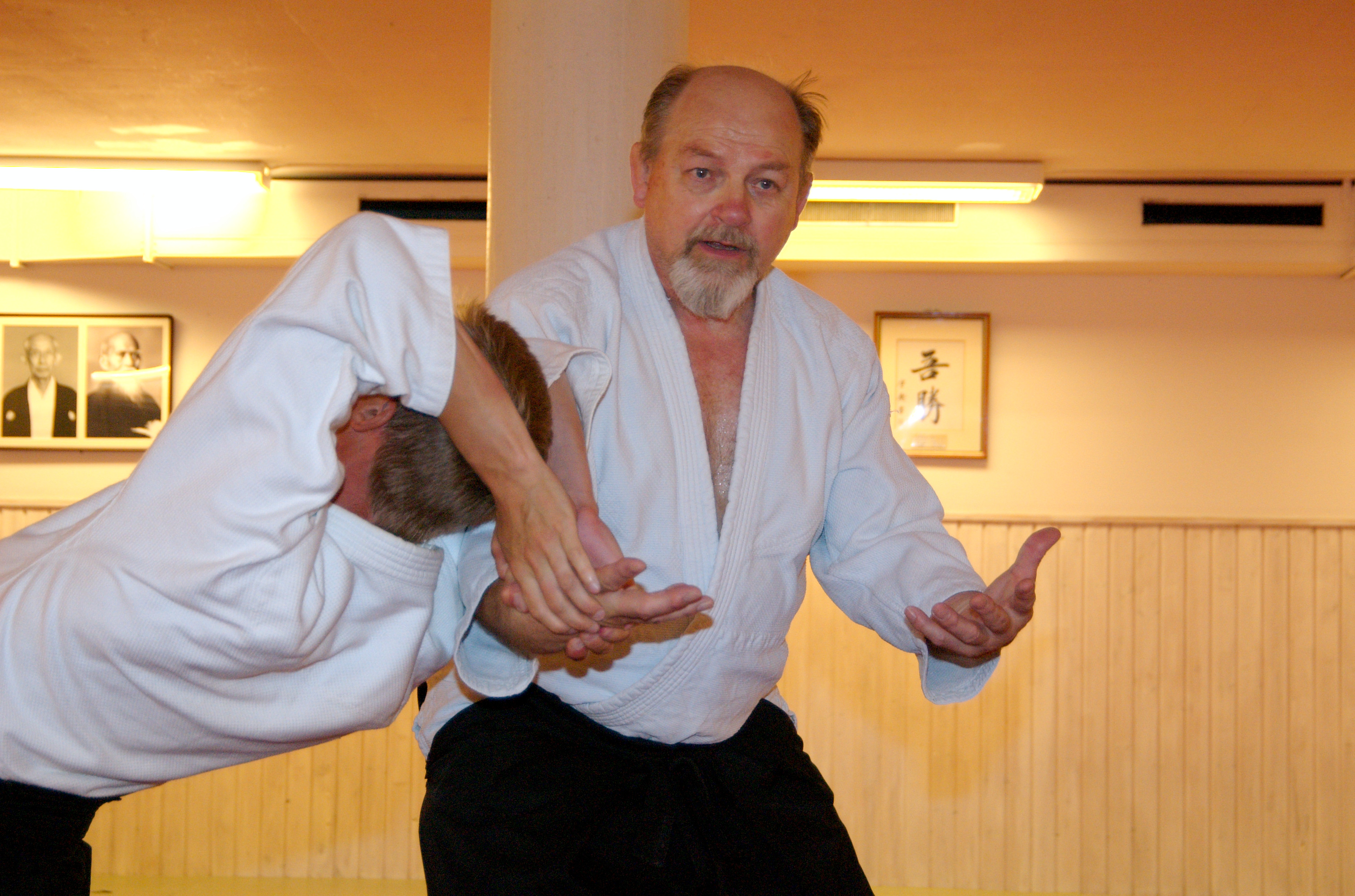
Jan Hermansson teaching in Stockholm

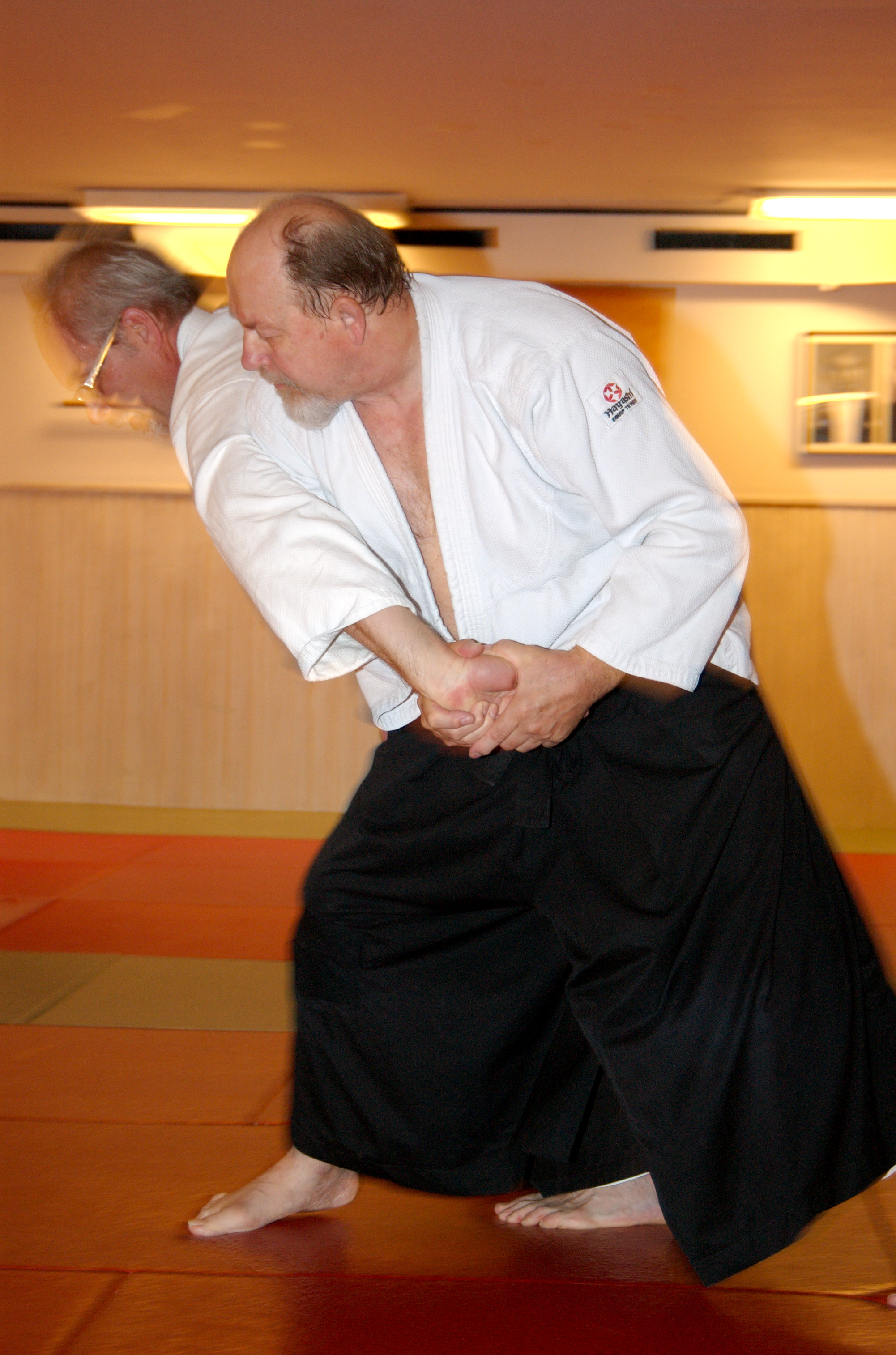
Jan Hermansson performs a throw

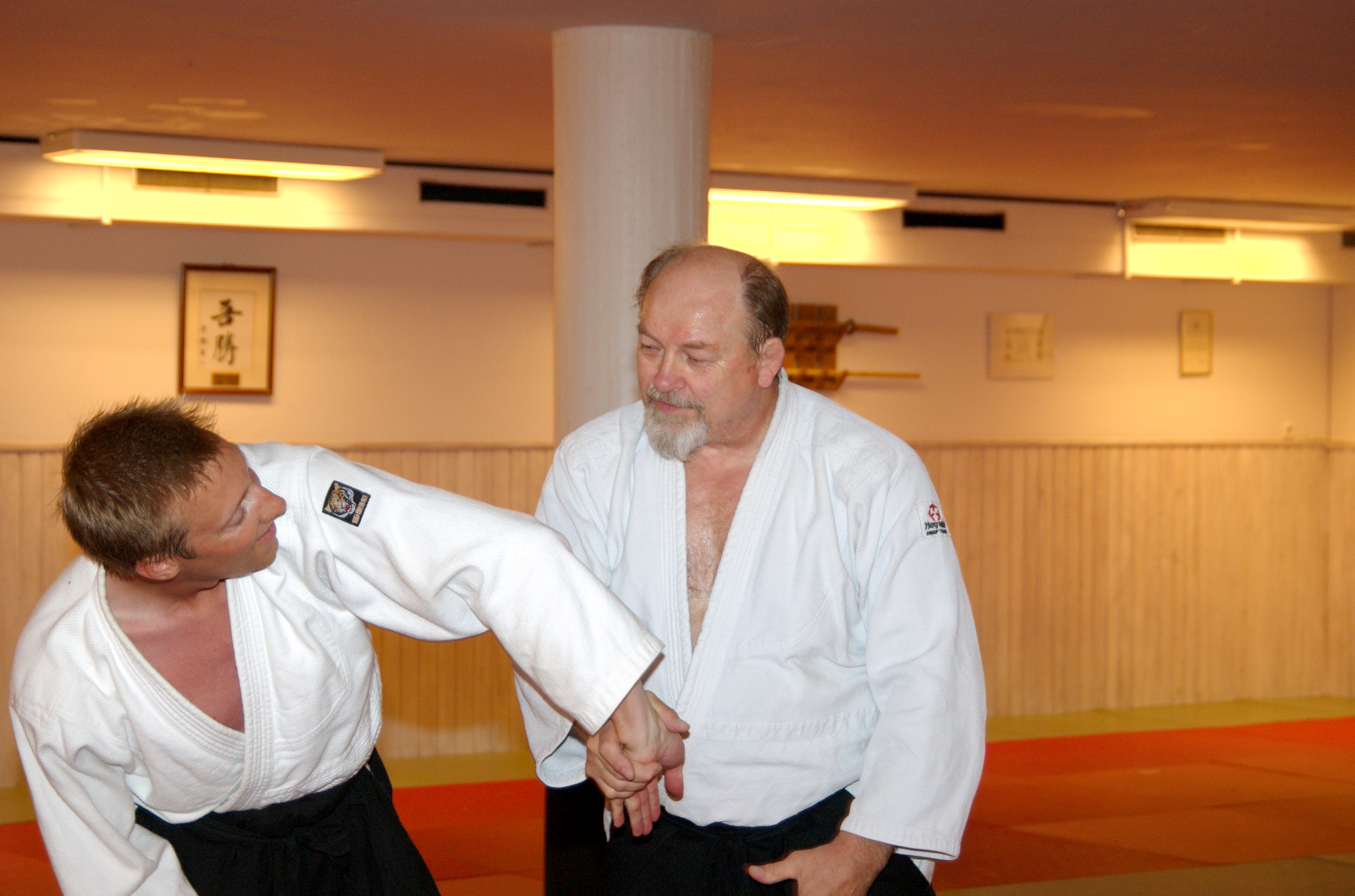
Jan Hermansson teaching in Stockholm
