= Nevarte Hamparian =

American dancer (1926–2019)

- Born: August 1, 1926; New York City
- Died: February 12, 2019 (aged 92)
- Other name: Rose Hamparian
- Occupation: Dancer

Nevarte Hamparian (August 1, 1926 – February 12, 2019) was an American dancer, called the "matron saint" of Armenian folk dance in the United States.

== Early life ==
Nevarte "Rose" Der Manuelian was born in New York City, the daughter of Armenian immigrants Nazar Der Manuelian and Zarouhi Avakian. She attended the High School of Music and Art, and studied dance at the School of American Ballet, with Muriel Stuart and Vincenzo Celli.

== Career ==
In 1942, Hamparian was a young dancer in a production of Aida at the Metropolitan Opera. She joined the USO in 1946, and toured the United States with Russian dancers, performing at military hospitals and bases.

Hamparian founded and directed the Nayiri Dance Group of New York in 1963, which specialized in Armenian folk dances, but also performed original works by Hamparian. Her children were members of the group, as was her sister-in-law, Alice Aghavni Kasbarian. The group performed at the World's Fair in New York in 1964 and 1965; later they also performed at Carnegie Hall, the Democratic National Convention, and the American Bicentennial festival at Rockefeller Center. She was a member of the Armenian Folk Dance Society of New York.

In 2010 she was honored with a festive luncheon at St. Illuminator's Armenian Cathedral in New York.

== Personal life ==
Nevarte Manuelian married artist and educator Nishan Hamparian. They had three children, Aram, Anahid and Vartan. She died in 2019, aged 92 years. Her grave is at Woodlawn Cemetery in the Bronx. Aram Suren Hamparian was her nephew.
