= Véronique Schiltz =

French archaeologist and art historian (1942–2019)

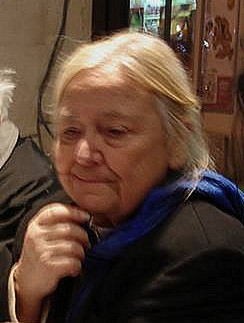
- Born: 23 December 1942; Châteauroux, France
- Died: 4 February 2019 (aged 76); Paris
- Awards: Legion of Honour; Ordre des Palmes Académiques

Academic background
- Education: École normale supérieure (Paris); École pratique des hautes études (PhD)
- Thesis: Origines et évolution des formes traditionnelles de l'art des steppes dans l'Antiquité (1995)

Academic work
- Discipline: Archaeology
- Sub-discipline: Scythian art
- Institutions: University of Franche-Comté
- Notable works: La Redécouverte de l’or des Scythes (2001); Vertumne et autres poèmes (1993)

Véronique Schiltz (23 December 1942, Châteauroux – 4 February 2019, Paris) was a French archaeologist, historian of art, and literary translator. She was a specialist in steppes art, in particular that of the Scythians, concentrating on the history and culture of steppe peoples between the first millennium BCE and the first millennium CE. She was a member of the Académie des Inscriptions et Belles-Lettres from 2011, and an Officer of the Legion of Honour.

== Life ==
Véronique Schiltz was born in 1942. Her father was a headmaster of the Lycée Louis-le-Grand. She attended the École normale supérieure (Paris), where besides ancient languages she also studied Russian.

Schiltz obtained a secondary teaching licence, the Agrégation de Lettres classiques, in 1964. In 1995, she defended her doctoral thesis (Origines et évolution des formes traditionnelles de l'art des steppes dans l'Antiquité) at the École pratique des hautes études.

Schiltz died in Paris on 4 February 2019. A memorial to her was held at the Anna Akhmatova Literary and Memorial Museum in Saint Petersburg on 14 February 2019.

== Career ==
Schiltz taught at the Lycée des Pontonniers in Strasbourg between 1964–1965, after which she moved to Moscow, where she taught French literature and culture at the Moscow State University till 1967.

She held various positions including the directorship of the archaeology and history of art departments of the University of Franche-Comté between 1967–2000. She was course director of ancient iconography and the art of the Near East at the Sorbonne from 1981 to 1987.

Schiltz curated several exhibitions on steppes art, notably Or des Scythes at the Grand Palais, Paris in 1975, and L'Or des cavaliers thraces at the Palais de la Civilisation, Montreal in 1987. In 2001, she organised an exhibition L'or des Amazones at the Musée Cernuschi, Paris, of bronzes, gold and silver crafts and ceramics of the nomadic tribes of the Don and Azov basins.

=== Archaeology ===
During her sojourn in the Soviet Union, Schiltz was able to access archaeological and archive materiel sourced between the Black Sea and the frontier with Mongolia. As a philologist and historian of art, she established a school for ancient nomadic cultures at Besançon's University of Franche-Comté.

Schiltz synthesised the varied cultural artefacts of the Scythians into a coherent paradigm. She showed that, despite their not leaving behind architectural or literary traces, their funerary customs illumined their world view. Their art comprised not only animal-like figures but also fantastic chimeras; their burial mounds contained weapons and toiletry as well as ceramics. The extent of the Scythian world, from the Crimea to the Yenisei river valley – across nearly 4000 km – showed a community of culture, both in space and in time. Schiltz was able to demonstrate that the melded animal figurines were not merely imaginative productions but an encoding of their beliefs.

=== Translations ===
Schiltz met the Russian poet Joseph Brodsky in the Soviet Union and became a close friend. She would become a promoter of his works in France, translating several of his books. She was a translator for the radio station France Culture.

Brodsky's meditative poem Adieu, Mademoiselle Véronique is addressed to her. Schiltz translated other Russian authors of his generation, including Natalya Gorbanevskaya.

Schiltz also translated several academic and art history texts from the Russian, often publishing them under various pseudonyms. For instance, the preface to her translation of Mikhail Allenov on the art of the 19th century (L'art Russe, 1991) was written under the name of Catherine Astroff, while the main text was in her own name.

Schiltz's last publication was that of the short stories of Grigori Gorin titled The Very Truthful on Baron Munchausen. She had translated these much earlier in her career but published them only a few days before her death.

=== Art history ===
In 1998, Schiltz organised an exhibition at the Abbaye aux Dames in Caen on Russian avant-garde art from the Nukus Museum of Art.

== Selected works ==
=== Academic ===
- Histoires de kourganes : La redécouverte de l'or des Scythes. Collection « Découvertes Gallimard / Archéologie » (nº 130) (in French). Paris: Éditions Gallimard. 20 November 1991. ISBN 978-2-0705-3174-5.
- Les Scythes et les nomades des steppes, VIIIe siècle av. J.-C.- Ier siècle apr. J.-C. Paris: Gallimard. 1994.
- La Redécouverte de l'or des Scythes : Histoires de kourganes. Collection « Découvertes Gallimard / Archéologie » (nº 130) (in French). Paris: Éditions Gallimard. 14 February 2001 [first published 1991]. ISBN 978-2-0707-6085-5.
- Sciti La civiltà delle steppe. Grandi civiltà. Rome: Rizzoli. 2005.

=== Translations ===
- Kazimir Malevich (1974). De Cézanne au suprématisme. Age d’Homme.
- Joseph Brodsky (1987). Poèmes. Gallimard.
- Joseph Brodsky (1993). Vertumne et autres poèmes. Gallimard.
- Anna Akhmatova (2003). Trois lettres. Le Lecteur Saint-Pétersbourg.
- Vasily Grossman (2007). Carnets de guerre. Calmann-Lévy.

== Honors and awards ==
- Knight of the Order of Legion of Honour (2010)
- Officer of the Ordre National du Mérite (2016)
- Knight of the Ordre des Palmes Académiques
