= Godzilla (singer) =

Tanzanian singer (1988–2019)

Background information
- Also known as: Salasala
- Born: Golden Jacob; 5 January 1988; Morogoro, Tanzania
- Died: 12 February 2019 (aged 31) Kinondoni, Dar es Salaam, Tanzania
- Genres: hip hop, Bongo Flava, Afro pop, contemporary R&B
- Occupations: Rapper, singer, songwriter
- Instruments: Vocals
- Years active: 2006–2019

Golden Jacob Mbunda (5 January 1988 – 12 February 2019), known by his stage name Godzilla, was a Tanzanian hip hop recording artist, singer and songwriter.

== Early life ==
Godzilla and his two siblings were raised by their mother in Morogoro, after their dad died while he was only two years.

== Career ==
In early 2007 Godzilla participated in the freestyle battle, he didn't win the first place, but that freestyle battle was a huge success for him as a platform. Because it let him to be known and got him his first big radio interview and became one among the first rappers performed in big stages without any official single on radio. In 2008 Godzilla joined Malaria No More in their Zinduka Campaign, a campaign aimed to eliminate malaria. In January 2014 Godzilla released his first official mixtape that had 18 songs like Illumi-Naught, The Same, Freestyle, Boss, Tungi, Ready or not, cake, Otis, Happy Birthday, Freestyle feat. Joti, F**k with me you know I got it, Commercial, Maturation of Godzizi, Money feat. Gosby, Hight Tonight, Closer feat. Cliff mitindo and Lakuchumpa feat. Joti.

Mbunda died from various health complications, including malaria, hypertension and diabetes on February 12, 2019.

== Discography ==
Singles

- Salasala
- Lakuchumpa
- Otis
- Kingzilla
- Milele
- Illumi-Naught
- Nataka
- Thank God
- Karibu Yako
- Nisome
- You and I
- Nobody
- Poza maumivu
- Stay
- Hard work pays
- Tungi

== Music, awards and music tours ==
In 2009 Godzilla experienced the tour life, was among the artists that performed at the Serengeti fiesta tour in 2009, Tanzania's biggest nationwide music tour, covering various regions. Godzilla performed on the same stage that international artist Busta rhymes performed. Godzilla performed at Serengeti fiesta tour again in 2010 and 2011, whereby Ludacris was the international artist on the final tour that took place in Dar es salaam. In 2012 he hit the same stage as Rick Ross did, the same as in 2013 and 2014. In 2012 Godzilla was nominated for Kilimanjaro Tanzania Music awards for Best Hip hop Song of the Year, and in 2013 Godzilla was nominated for 3 Kilimanjaro Tanzania Music Awards for Best hip hop Artist, Best Collaboration, and Best Hip hop song of the Year for his song Kingzilla. In 2012 and 2013 Godzilla was among the artists that performed at the Kili Music Tour, that was covering various regions and at the main event Kili Awards that took place at Mlimani City in Dar es Salaam.

== Awards and nominations ==
Year	Award	Category	Nominated work	Result
2012	Tanzania Music Awards	Best Best Hip hop song	Salasala	Nominated
2013	Tanzania Music Awards	Best Hip hop Song	Kingzilla	Nominated
2013	Tanzania Music Awards	Best Collaboration	Kingzilla	Nominated
2013	Tanzania Music Awards	Best Hip hop Artist of the Year		Nominated
