= James Jackson Hough =

American businessman and philanthropist (1945–2019)

James Jackson "Jack" Hough (July 19, 1945 – February 7, 2019) was an American businessman and philanthropist from Gainesville, Georgia. He founded the company MSE Branded Foods and was its President and CEO for 23 years. Hough was successful in using the company to establish food courts at airports, colleges, and malls.

Born in Decatur, Alabama, he had served in the U.S. Air Force. He received his bachelor's degree in accounting from University of Alabama.

Hough was shot to death in a pharmacy parking lot in Georgia on February 7, 2019. In 2021, the shooter, DeMarvin Bennett was found guilty of murder and sentenced to life in prison with the possibility of parole after 30 years. In July 2021, Bennett was charged with murdering fellow inmate Ali Tanner, who was serving life without parole for the 2014 murder of his girlfriend.
