= Awlad Hossain Chakladar =

Bangladeshi freedom fighter, film producer, and director (died 2019)

- Born: 1950/51
- Died: 4 February 2019 (aged 68)
- Occupations: Film producer and director

Awlad Hossain Chakladar (1950/51 – 4 February 2019) was a Bangladeshi freedom fighter, film producer and director.

== Biography ==
Chakladar was a freedom fighter. He was the director of Nag Nortoki. This film was Anjuman Ara Shilpi's debut film. He was the producer of Premik and Jogajog. In 1985 Premik won National Film Award in two categories. In 1988 Jogajog also won National Film Award in two categories.

Chakladar died on 4 February 2019 at the age of 68.

== Selected filmography ==
=== Producer ===
- Din Mojur
- Premik
- Jogajog

=== Director ===
- Nag Nortoki
