= Mary Beth Stearns =

American solid-state physicist (1925–2019)

- Born: Mary Beth Gorman (née Gorman); February 5, 1925; Minneapolis, Minnesota
- Died: February 14, 2019 (aged 94); Cupertino, California
- Education: Cornell University 1952; University of Minnesota 1946
- Known for: Fellow of the American Physical Society in the Division of Condensed Matter Physics
- Scientific career
- Fields: Professor in nuclear physics/physics

Mary Beth Stearns (née Gorman, February 5, 1925 – February 14, 2019) was an American solid-state physicist known for her work on magnetism.

== Early life and career ==
Mary Beth Gorman was born in Minneapolis, Minnesota on February 5, 1925. She graduated from the University of Minnesota in 1946. She completed a Ph.D. in nuclear physics in 1952 at Cornell University.

After completing her doctorate, she became a researcher at the Carnegie Institute of Technology. She moved to the University of Pittsburgh in 1957 and to General Dynamics in 1958 before becoming a researcher for the Ford Motor Company in 1960; she remained at Ford for over 20 years, and as a principal scientist became one of the earliest female executives at Ford.

In 1981, Stearns moved to Arizona State University as a professor of physics. She became Regent's Professor of Physics in 1988.

== Research ==
Stearns' early research work involved nuclear Compton scattering, and the spectroscopy of mesonic atoms. Her work on gamma-ray scattering led her to study the Mössbauer effect and to use it to study the energy levels of iron atoms. She then used this which led her to study nuclear magnetic resonance of magnetic ions, and theoretical work on the quantum structure of these materials.

== Death ==
Mary Beth Stearns died in Cupertino, California on February 14, 2019, at the age of 94.

== Recognition ==
Stearns became a Fellow of the American Physical Society for the Division of Condensed Matter Physics in 1973.
