= John Rone =

American stage actor and director (1949–2019)

John Howard Rone
- Rone at the Rhodes College Homecoming in 2006
- Born: February 14, 1949; Memphis, Tennessee, U.S.
- Died: February 4, 2019 (aged 69); Memphis, Tennessee, U.S.
- Education: Rhodes College; University of Memphis
- Occupations: Director, actor

John Howard Rone (February 14, 1949 – February 4, 2019) was an American stage actor and director. A lifelong Memphian, Rone was a prominent member of the Memphis theatre community.

== Early life ==
Rone was born in the Memphis suburb of Germantown, Tennessee. There he attended Byars-Hall High School. Rone then earned his BA in theatre from Rhodes College and later his MA in theatre from the University of Memphis.

== Career ==
Rone played multiple roles in the Memphis theatre community, but was best known for his directing. He made his community theatre directorial debut in 1983 with a production of Portrait in Black. Rone worked with multiple troupes and organizations over the course of his long career including Theatre Memphis, Playhouse on the Square, and Germantown Community Theater. Rone was nominated for several Ostrander Awards for his work in various community theatre performances including Sense and Sensibility, Measure for Measure, and I Am a Camera. Rone received the Eugart Yerian Award for Lifetime Service to Memphis Theatre at the 31st Ostrander Awards in 2014.

In addition to his theatre work, Rone returned to work at his alma mater Rhodes College, where he served as director of college events and of the Meeman Center for Life Long Learning.

=== Stage credits ===
- She Stoops to Conquer as Sir Charles Marlow

==== Theatre Memphis ====
- Inherit the Wind
- Measure for Measure
- Hamlet
- A Perfect Ganesh, director
- A Christmas Carol (2017), director
- 12 Angry Jurors (2017), director
- Sense and Sensibility (2017), director

==== Playhouse on the Square ====
- A Wonderful Life as Clarence, the Angel
- The Mousetrap as Mr. Paravicini

==== Germantown Community Theatre ====
- Sherlock's Last Case
- I Am a Camera
- The Foreigner
- The Woman in Black
- The Importance of Being Earnest, director

==== New Moon Theatre Company ====
- Lettice and Lovage (2016), director
