= Brahmanapalli Balaiah =

Indian politician (1930–2019)

MLA of Kamareddy
- In office 1978–1983
- Preceded by: Y. Sathyanarayana
- Succeeded by: Parsi Gangaiah

Personal details
- Born: 1930
- Died: 21 February 2019 (aged 88–89)
- Party: Indian National Congress

Brahmanapalli Balaiah was an Indian politician belonging to Indian National Congress. He was elected as a member of Andhra Pradesh Legislative Assembly from Kamareddy in 1978. He died of heart attack on 21 February 2019.
