= 2019 in China =

- Decades: 1990s; 2000s; 2010s; 2020s
- See also: Other events of 2019; History of China • Timeline • Years

The following lists events that happened during 2019 in China.

== Incumbents ==
- General Secretary of the Communist Party – Xi Jinping
- President – Xi Jinping
- Vice President – Wang Qishan
- Premier – Li Keqiang
- Congress chairman – Li Zhanshu
- Consultative Conference chairman – Wang Yang
- Supervision Commission director – Yang Xiaodu

=== Governors ===
- Governor of Anhui Province – Li Guoying
- Governor of Fujian Province – Tang Dengjie
- Governor of Gansu Province – Tang Renjian
- Governor of Guangdong Province – Ma Xingrui
- Governor of Guizhou Province – Shen Yiqin
- Governor of Hainan Province – Shen Xiaoming
- Governor of Hebei Province – Xu Qin
- Governor of Heilongjiang Province – Wang Wentao
- Governor of Henan Province – Chen Run'er (until 25 October), Yin Hong (starting 25 October)
- Governor of Hubei Province – Wang Xiaodong
- Governor of Hunan Province – Xu Dazhe
- Governor of Jiangsu Province – Wu Zhenglong
- Governor of Jiangxi Province – Yi Lianhong
- Governor of Jilin Province – Jing Junhai
- Governor of Liaoning Province – Tang Yijun
- Governor of Qinghai Province – Liu Ning
- Governor of Shaanxi Province – Liu Guozhong
- Governor of Shandong Province – Gong Zheng
- Governor of Shanxi Province – Lou Yangsheng (until December), Lin Wu (starting December)
- Governor of Sichuan Province – Yin Li
- Governor of Yunnan Province – vacant
- Governor of Zhejiang Province – Yuan Jiajun

== Events ==
=== January ===
- January 3:
  - At 15:07 – The Beijing Aerospace Command and Control Center issued a command for the separation of the lander and the patrol device from the Chang'e 4 relay satellite.
  - At 22:22 – The patrol began to separate, and it(玉兔二號月球車) stepped on the far side of moon.
- January 8 – 2019 Beijing school attack

=== February ===
- February 23 – In Ningbo, Xiangshan, a fishing boat sank with 7 people. Two were rescued while five were missing.

=== March ===
- March 21 – 2019 Yancheng chemical plant explosion
- March 22 – Zaoyang car explosion
- March 30 – Muli County Forest Fire, causing 31 deaths, mainly firefighters

=== April ===
- April 11 – Shenzhen Short-term Extreme Heavy Rainfall, causing 11 deaths
- April 15 – Chinese first test-tube baby becomes mother.

=== May ===
- May 9 (Washington time) – US President Donald Trump announced that the punitive tariff rate on Mainland China goods of US$200 billion will be raised to 25% from May 10.
- May 9 (Beijing time) – At a regular press conference, A spokesman of the Ministry of Commerce said that China is well prepared to deal with all possible preparations.
- May 20 – Google suspends business relationship with Huawei. This event comes following the arrest of Meng Wanzhou by Canadian authorities at the request of the United States due to sanctions against Iran.

=== June ===
- June 4 – The 30th Anniversary of the 1989 Tiananmen Square Protests, Chinese authorities launched an extensive "stability maintenance" campaign. Hundreds of Twitter accounts were blocked. Internationally several organizations including the National Endowment for Democracy, the German Green Party Faction, and the British China Labour Solidarity have remembered the protests with events and protests.
- June 9 – Hundreds of thousands of people march in Hong Kong against a law critics fear could let China target political opponents in the territory.
- June 16 – Between 388,000 and 2,000,000 protesters take to the streets of Hong Kong against an anti-extradition law they believe will break down the firewall between Hong Kong and the mainland.
- June 17 - An earthquake with a magnitude of 5.8 kills 13 and injures less than 200.

=== July ===
- July 1 － The "Regulations on the Management of Domestic Waste in Shanghai" came into effect, announcing that Shanghai entered the era of mandatory household waste classification.
- July 12 － the People's Bank of China held a press conference on financial statistics in the first half of 2019. Overall, the current banking system is reasonably abundant, the monetary credit and social financing scale are growing moderately, and the market interest rate is running smoothly.

=== August ===
- August 10 – 32 are killed and 1,000,000 are evacuated as Typhoon Lekima makes landfall in Zhejiang. Earlier it had caused flooding in the Philippines.
- August 12 — Hong Kong flights are canceled due to protests.
- August 13 — In the Fu Guohao incident, Hong Kong protestors detain, search, and beat Global Times journalist Fu Guohao at the Hong Kong International Airport.
- August 16 — Actress Liu Yifei posts a pro-Hong Kong police comment on Weibo, sparking a call for a boycott of the movie she stars in, Mulan.
- August 18 — As many as 1.7 million demonstrators march during a rainstorm in the 11th week of anti-government protests in Hong Kong.
- August 22
  - YouTube announces that it has disabled 210 channels linked to the Hong Kong protest campaign. This follows similar actions by Twitter and Facebook.
  - Protests in Hong Kong enter their 12th week as police reintroduced water-cannons and tear gas.
- August 27 - Costco opens their first store in China in Shanghai's Minhang district. During the day, the store closed early due to massive crowds.

=== September ===
- September 21 – Videos on Twitter and YouTube that show hundreds of shackled, blindfolded prisoners with shaved heads, presumed to be Uighur Muslims in Korla, Xinjiang, appear to be authentic.

=== October ===
- October 1 — 70th anniversary of the People's Republic of China
- October 18–27 – The 2019 Military World Games takes place in Wuhan, Hubei province

=== December ===
- December 31 – The World Health Organization was informed of a cluster of cases of pneumonia of unknown cause detected in Wuhan, Hubei. The illness would come to be identified as coronavirus disease 2019 (also known as COVID-19), and the virus that causes the disease would be named severe acute respiratory syndrome coronavirus 2 (or SARS-CoV-2).

== Popular culture ==
=== Film ===
- List of Chinese films of 2019

== Deaths ==
=== January ===
- January 1
  - Ke Hua, Chinese diplomat (b. 1915)
  - Tu Mingjing, Chinese materials scientist (b. 1928)
- January 2 – Gu Fangzhou, Chinese virologist (b. 1926)
- January 3 – Gao Chengyong, Chinese serial killer (b. 1964)
- January 4 – Zhang Lianwen, Chinese actor (b. 1945)
- January 5 – Sun Ganqing, Chinese general (b. 1919)
- January 8 – Gao Changqing, Chinese surgeon, member of the Chinese Academy of Engineering (b. 1960)
- January 10 – Deng Tietao, Chinese physician (b. 1916)
- January 15 – Bai Hua, Chinese novelist, playwright and poet (b. 1930)
- January 16 – Yu Min, Chinese physicist (b. 1926
- January 19 – Liang Jingkui, Chinese physical chemist (b. 1931)
- January 26 – Mao Dehua, Chinese geographer and politician, Vice Chairman of Xinjiang (b. 1935)
- January 29 – Jin Guozhang, Chinese pharmacologist, psychopathologist and educator (b. 1927)

=== February ===
- February 3
  - Ruan Xueyu, 86, pressure processing specialist
  - Zhang Yumao, 83, literary scholar and politician
- February 4 – Fang Fukang, 83, physicist, President of Beijing Normal University
- February 6 – Ye Qingyao, 91, Taiwanese-born engineer and politician
- February 11 – He Bingsong, 87, legal scholar
- February 12
  - Cheng Zhiqing, 84, chemist and politician, Vice Chairwoman of the Revolutionary Committee of the Chinese Kuomintang
  - Zhan Ziqing, 81, historian, Vice President of Northeast Normal University
- February 13 – Zhang Li, 67, table tennis player
- February 16
  - Fang Huai, 101, major general of the People's Liberation Army
  - Gu Linfang, 90, police official and politician, Secretary-General of the Central Political and Legal Affairs Commission and Vice Minister of Public Security
  - Li Rui, 101, politician and historian
- February 19 – Hu Peiquan, 98, aerospace engineer and educator
- February 20
  - An Zuozhang, 92, historian
  - Zhang Wenbin, 81, archaeologist, curator and politician, Director of the National Cultural Heritage Administration
- February 21 – E Dongchen, 79, earth scientist and polar explorer
- February 22
  - Sun Wei, 83, civil engineer, member of the Chinese Academy of Engineering
  - Wang Yening, 92, physicist, member of the Chinese Academy of Sciences
- February 24 – Li Xueqin, 85, historian and archaeologist

=== March ===
- March 4 – Mao Zhiyong, 89, politician, Party Secretary of Hunan and Jiangxi
- March 5
  - Chu Shijian, 91, tobacco executive and entrepreneur
  - Ding Yi, 91, engineer and business executive, founded Dongfang Electric
  - Yang Naisi, 91, linguist
- March 7 – Shen Ziyin, 91, physician, academician of the Chinese Academy of Sciences
- March 11
  - Leetsch C. Hsu, 98, mathematician and educator
  - Xing Shizhong, 80, general, President of the PLA National Defence University
- March 19 – Wei Maowen, 95, politician, Governor of Qiannan Buyei and Miao Autonomous Prefecture (1956-1966)
- March 23 – Li Fulin, 59, police official and politician, Vice Governor of Hainan

=== April ===
- April 3 – Guo Kun, 83, Antarctic explorer.
- April 6 – Lin Mingyu, 81, Chinese politician, Party Secretary of Haikou.
- April 7 – Xiong Zhaoren, 107, general.
- April 19 – Xiao Yang, 80, President of the Supreme People's Court.
- April 20 – Wu Yili, 89, one of the first pianists in China.
- April 26 – Hu Peizhao, 82, economist.

=== May ===
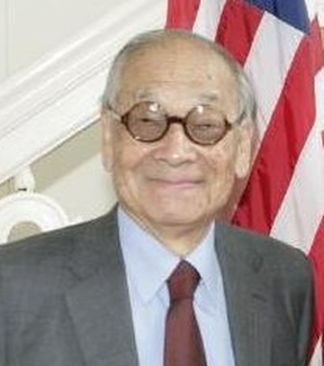
I. M. Pei

- May 2 – Li Xintian, 95, psychologist.
- May 4 – Yang Shengnan, 81, historian and palaeographer.
- May 5 – Feng Shunhua, 85, economist.
- May 9
  - Yuan Baohua, 103, politician and academic administrator
  - Zhan Wenshan, 78, physicist
- May 11 – Rong Baisheng, 88, architect and civil engineer
- May 12 – Dong Jian, 83, literary scholar
- May 13 – Hu Jinqing, 83, animator and director
- May 14 – Liu Housheng, 98, theatre director, critic, scholar, and playwright
- May 16
  - Liu Xianjue, 87, architectural historian.
  - I. M. Pei, Chinese-American architect (b. 1917)
- May 23 – Zhang Shiping, 72, businessman, chairman of China Hongqiao Group.
- May 25 – Mou Tun-fei, 78, film director

=== June ===
- June 3 – Tang Dingyuan (b.1920)
- June 9 – Wang Hanru (b.1938)
  - Xu Datong (b.1929)
- June 10
  - Hao Yun (b.1925)
  - Wang Jun (b.1941)
  - Yang Yang (b.1974/1975)
- June 14 – Ning Bin (b.1959)
- June 16 – Feng Chuanhan (b.1914)
- June 19
  - Peng Xiaolian (b.1953)
  - Su Huiyu (b.1935)
- June 24 – Wu Guoqing (b.1937)
- June 25
  - Li Lun (b.1927)
  - Xu Zhongyu (b.1915)
- June 27 – Yu Pufan (b.1923)
- June 29
  - Jiang Chongjing (b.1916)
  - Sun Zhongliang (b.1936)

=== July ===
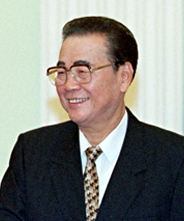
Li Peng

- July 2 – Li Zuixiong, conservation scientist.(b.1941)
- July 3 – Li Xintian, novelist.(b.1929)
- July 5
  - Hu Maozhou, politician.(b.1928)
  - Zhang Baifa, politician.(b.1935)
- July 7 – Liu Wenxi, painter.(b.1933)
- July 8 – Zhai Xiangjun, translator and educator.(b.1939)
- July 13 – Wang Jiafu, legal scholar.(b.1930)
- July 14 – Yu Dunkang, philosopher and historian of philosophy.(b.1930)
- July 15 – Feng Yuanwei, Chinese politician (b. 1930)
- July 16 – Su Shuyang, playwright, novelist, and screenwriter.(b.1938)
- July 18 – Zhao Meng, sculptor.(b.1957)
- July 19 – Yao Lee, Chinese singer (b. 1922)
- July 22 – Li Peng, 4th Premier of the People's Republic of China (b. 1928)
- July 23 – Cao Shuangming, general (b.1930)
- July 28 – Li Jisheng, aerospace engineer (b.1943)
- July 29 – Wang Qidong, materials scientist and politician (b.1921)
- July 30 – Zhao Zhihong, serial killer and rapist (b.1972)
- July 31 – Chen Shunyao, politician and academic administrator (b.1917)

=== August ===
- August 1 – Zha Quanxing (b. 1925)
- August 6 – Zhuo Renxi (b. 1931)
- August 12 – Lu Yonggen (b. 1930)
- August 15 – Qin Hanzhang, Chinese engineer, scientist and supercentenarian (b. 1908)
- August 26 – Chen Jiayong (b. 1922)
- August 27 – Zhang Zong (b. 1929)
- August 28 – Nie Yuanzi (b. 1921)
- August 31 – Wang Buxuan (b. 1922)

=== November ===
- November 27 – Godfrey Gao, Taiwanese-Canadian model and actor (b. 1984)

== Links ==
- Media related to 2019 in China at Wikimedia Commons
