= Sun Wei =

Sun Wei is the name of:

- Sun Wei (painter) (9th century), Tang dynasty Chinese painter
- Sun Wei (engineer) (1935–2019), Chinese civil engineer
- Sun Wei (baseball) (born 1976), Chinese baseball player
- Sun Wei (fencer) (born 1992), Chinese fencer
- Sun Wei (gymnast) (born 1995), Chinese gymnast
- Sun Wei (politician, born 1954), Chinese politician
- Sun Wei (politician, born 1961), Chinese politician
- Wei Sun Christianson (born 1956), Chinese-American businesswoman
- A woman involved in the Thallium poisoning case of Zhu Ling
