= Hefei University =

University in China

Coordinates: 31.7532°N 117.2583°E

- 合肥大学
- Former names: Hefei Union University
- Motto: "厚德 博学 善思 致用"
- Type: Public University
- Established: 1980
- Founders: Yang Chengzong
- President: Wang Qidong
- Academic staff: 903
- Students: 17000
- Location: Hefei, Anhui, China
- Website: www.hfuu.edu.cn

Hefei University
- Simplified Chinese: 合肥大学
- Traditional Chinese: 合肥大學
Transcriptions
Standard Mandarin
- Hanyu Pinyin: Héféi Dàxué

Hefei Union University
- Simplified Chinese: 合肥联合大学
- Traditional Chinese: 合肥聯合大學
Transcriptions
Standard Mandarin
- Hanyu Pinyin: Héféi Liánhé Dàxué

Hefei University (old Chinese name)
- Simplified Chinese: 合肥学院
- Traditional Chinese: 合肥學院
Transcriptions
Standard Mandarin
- Hanyu Pinyin: Héféi Xuéyuàn

Hefei University (HU; Chinese: 合肥大学; pinyin: Héféi Dàxué) is an institution of higher learning in Hefei, the capital of Anhui Province, China. It was founded in 1980 as Hefei Union University (合肥联合大学), by nuclear chemist Yang Chengzong (杨承宗). In 2002, it merged with Hefei Education College and Hefei Normal School to form Hefei University. The university has 16 departments, 5 research centers and a further education college, offering 40 bachelor's degree programs with a full-time student population totaling 12,527 (as of December 2007) on two campuses, the Downtown Campus (or Huangshan Road Campus) and the Nanyanhu Lake Campus. The university's strength lies in engineering, economics and management, and it also comprises literature, science and education. The current party secretary is Cai Jingming, and the current president is Wang Qidong.

== Mission ==
The vision of HU is focused on "regionalization, practicability and internationalization". Aiming to serve the regional economy, HU's philosophy is, "nurturing students with morality through practical curriculum and teaching methods". HU has always been encouraging teaching reforms so as to equip its graduates with practical competence and skills for their future career. In the recent years "N+2 Assessment System" has been introduced at HU, by which students are evaluated on the basis of their academic learning together with the final exams at each semester. The "9-Semester System" is specially designed in which sophomores are required to have a single semester for field learning before continuing their further academic studies in order to strengthen problem solving skills required for the professional career in the future.

== International programs ==
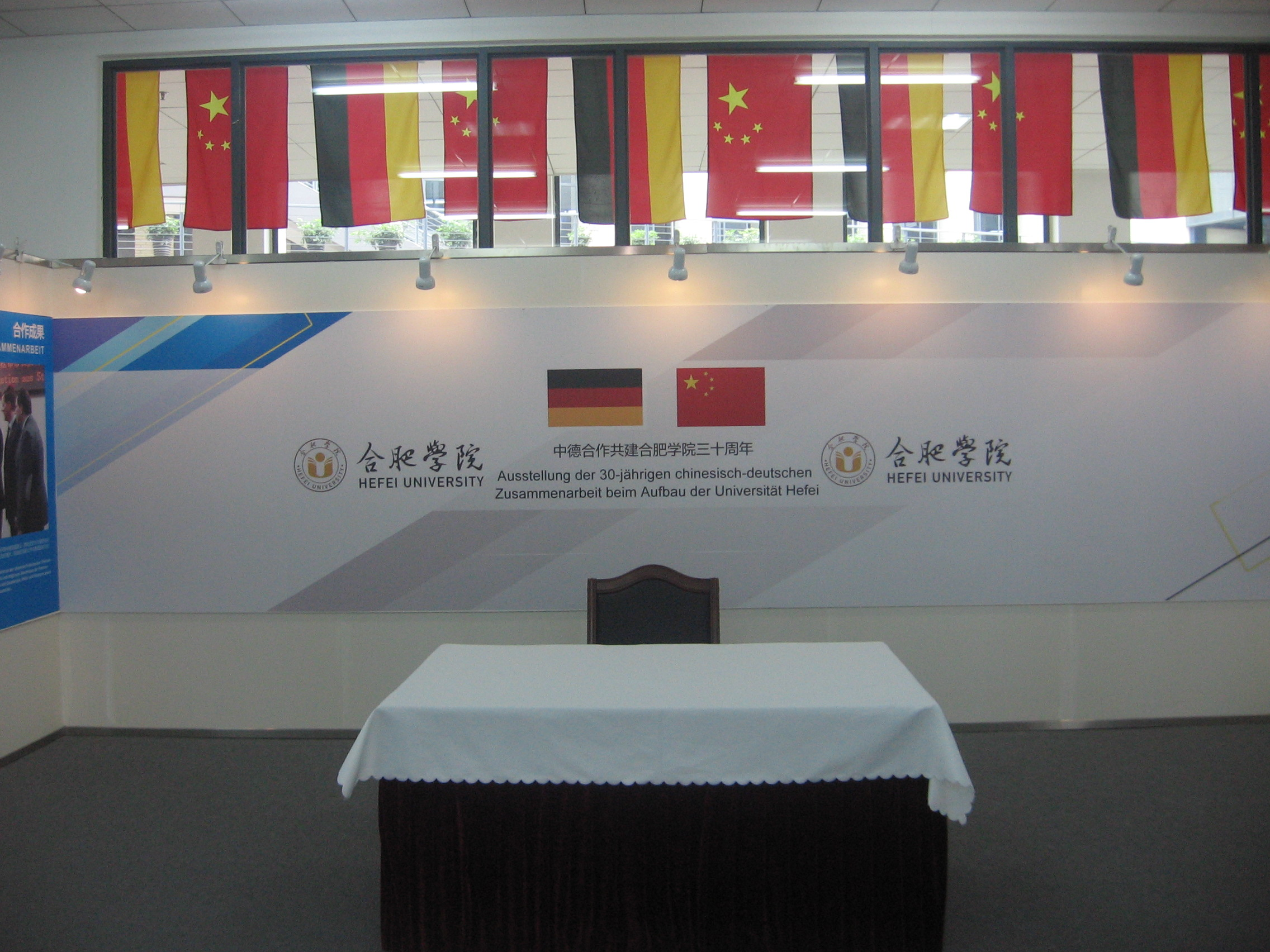
Exhibition in Hefei University to welcome the visit of German Chancellor Angela Merkel and Chinese Premier Li Keqiang on Oct 30th, 2015.

HU has exchanges programs with universities and institutions around the world. HU has engaged in various programs with Germany for faculty training, exchange of students and joint development for some of its departments since the early 1980s. HU now has 9 sister universities in Germany mainly with the applied science universities in line with HU's mission. Programs of student exchange and faculty training have been expanding with cooperation on some dual degree programs since 2000. HU started similar programs in South Korea since the late 1990s and so far it has 7 sister universities in South Korea with exchange programs for students and faculty and dual degree programs in language, Tourism Management, Computer Science and Chinese Teaching.

Each year some 50 foreign students are admitted into HU for Chinese language and culture learning, and joint workshops and internship/thesis writing are also arranged on the campus for international students from sister universities. International seminars on education, rural development, tourism management and environmental protection were also hosted with participants from Germany, Korea, Japan, Singapore and other countries. In addition to Germany and Korea, HU also has cooperation relations with universities in the United States, Austria, Thailand, Britain and Spain as well. International professors from Germany, Korea, the United States, Canada, Australia and Japan are recruited to teach and research on the campus each year.

As a great model of China-Germany cooperation, German Chancellor Angela Merkel paid a visit to Hefei University during her eighth visit to China on October 30, 2015. The visit was accompanied by Chinese Premier Li Keqiang who is a local Hefei person.
