= Ziqing =

Ziqing can refer to:

- Huang Ziqing (Chinese: 黄子卿; 1900–1982), Chinese chemist
- Zhan Ziqing (Chinese: 詹子庆; 1937–2019), Chinese historian
- Zhu Ziqing (Chinese: 朱自清), Chinese poet
