= Zhan (surname) =

Zhan (Mandarin: [ʈʂan]) is the pinyin romanization of several Chinese names, also spelled Chan in the Wade–Giles system common in Taiwan and in older publications

== List of people with the surname Zhǎn (展) ==
- Zhan Ziqian (fl. 6th century), painter and official during the Sui dynasty
- Zhan Zhao, fictional Song dynasty hero from the novel The Seven Heroes and Five Gallants
- Zhan Wang (born 1962), Chinese sculptor
- Zhan Tao (born 1963), Chinese mathematician

== List of people with the surname Zhàn (湛) ==
369 湛 0.0079% 10.50 Hunan

Also spelled 'Cham' based on the Cantonese pronunciation (Yale Romanization: Jaam; Jyutping: Zaam3)

- Zhan Ruoshui (1466–1560), Chinese philosopher
- Kim Cham (born 1946), Hong Kong businessman and politician

== List of people with the surname Zhān (詹) ==
127 詹 0.110% 147.00 Guangdong Also spelled Chim based on the Cantonese pronunciation (Yale Romanization: Jīm; Jyutping: Zim1), Chiem, and Cheam, Chiam or Chen based on the Hokkien pronunciation (Pe̍h-ōe-jī: Chiam):

- Chan Hao-ching (born 1993), Taiwanese tennis player
- Cheam June Wei (born 1997), Malaysian badminton player
- Chiam See Tong (born 1935), Singaporean politician and lawyer
- Chim Pui-chung (born 1946), Hong Kong politician
- Jim Chim (born 1965), Hong Kong actor and comedian
- Windy Zhan (born 2006), Hong Kong singer and actress, a member of the girl group After Class
- Latisha Chan (born 1989), Taiwanese tennis player
- Yuh Nung Jan (born 1945), Chinese-born American neuroscientist
- Zhan Shichai (1841–1893), Chinese giant, stage name Chang Woo Gow
- Zhan Silu (born 1961), Chinese bishop
- Zhan Tianyou (1861–1919), Chinese railroad engineer
- Zhan Wenshan (1941–2019), Chinese physicist
- Zhan Ziqing (1937–2019), Chinese historian
- Yuri Chan (born 1981) of the Taiwanese group Nan Quan Mama
- Adam Chen (born 1976), Singaporean actor
- Lesley Cheam Wei Yeng (born 1996), Malaysian beauty queen who won the Miss Universe Malaysia 2022

== List of people with the surname Zhān (占) ==
- Zhan Xugang (born on 1974), Chinese weightlifter

== List of people with the surname Zhàn (战/戰) ==
- Elisa Chan (fl. 1980s–present), Taiwan-born American politician
- Zhan Yilin (born 1989), Chinese footballer
