= Mingyu (disambiguation) =

Mingyu is a South Korean rapper.

Mingyu may also refer to:

- Mingyu (Chinese name)
- Min-kyu, a Korean name and a list of people with the name
- Mingyu, a town in Nanchuan, Chongqing, China
