= Li Lun =

Li Lun or Lilun may refer to:

- One of the names used by Emperor Ruizong of Tang
- Li Lun (general), People's Liberation Army general
- Li Lun, Lad of Courage, children's novel
- Lilun, a village in Charusa District, Kohgiluyeh County, Kohgiluyeh and Boyer-Ahmad Province, Iran
- Eric Chu (朱立倫; Zhū Lìlún), a Taiwanese politician (born 1961)
