= Kunshan Senior High School =

School in Suzhou, Jiangsu, China

Kunshan Senior High School is one of the four-star high schools in Suzhou, Jiangsu Province, China. It is located in Kunshan, which is a county-level city under Suzhou. Kunshan Senior High School is in the downtown, right beside the only hill in Kunshan – Ma'an Hill, so it's rather easy to get there from every corner of the city. After the transformation of the campus in 2001, the campus now covers an area of 130 acres and has a construction area of over 86,000 square meters.

== History ==
It was first established in 1946, with a history of 65 years. The first president is Chen Qike. At that time, it was named Dongfanghong Middle School. Later on, the school was renamed as Kunshan Senior High School. In 1980, it was listed as one of the key schools by the government of Jiangsu province.

== Notable alumni ==
- Su Huiyu, legal scholar and professor

== Library ==
The school library was first built in 1946 and was awarded as first-rate library in Jiangsu Province in 2000. The main building is divided into four layers with a total construction area of nearly 3000 square meters.
