= Shaanxi Wolves =

- League: National Basketball League
- History: Hong Kong Bulls (2009–2013); Shaanxi Wolves (2014–present)
- Location: Weinan, Shaanxi, China
- Head coach: Park Myung-soo
- Affiliation: Xinda Group

The Shaanxi Xinda Wolves are a Chinese professional men's basketball club based in Weinan, Shaanxi, playing in China’s National Basketball League (NBL). The team won the 2015, 2017 and 2018 NBL championships.

== Current roster ==
2018 Shaanxi Wolves roster
Players
Coaches

Pos.	No.	Nat.	Name	Ht.	Wt.
C	0	(Sudan) (Lebanon)	Ater Majok	2.09 m (6 ft 10 in)	110 kg (243 lb)
G	1	(China)	Dong Jian	1.93 m (6 ft 4 in)	90 kg (198 lb)
G	5	(China)	Gao Yan	1.90 m (6 ft 3 in)	75 kg (165 lb)
F	7	(China)	Wang Junxi	2.03 m (6 ft 8 in)	95 kg (209 lb)
G	11	(China)	Feng Jiawei	1.90 m (6 ft 3 in)	85 kg (187 lb)
F	13	(China)	Yu Xiaohang	1.95 m (6 ft 5 in)	90 kg (198 lb)
C	15	(China)	Li Xiaopeng	2.04 m (6 ft 8 in)	88 kg (194 lb)
F	17	(China)	Li Shengdong	2.00 m (6 ft 7 in)	95 kg (209 lb)
F	20	(United States)	Jerrelle Benimon	2.03 m (6 ft 8 in)	110 kg (243 lb)
F	21	(China)	Raxit Karim	2.02 m (6 ft 8 in)	98 kg (216 lb)
C	22	(China)	Yang Wenxue	2.02 m (6 ft 8 in)	97 kg (214 lb)
F	23	(China)	Subihat Tursun	2.00 m (6 ft 7 in)	100 kg (220 lb)
C	33	(United States)	Troy Gillenwater	2.05 m (6 ft 9 in)	104 kg (229 lb)
C	55	(United States)	David Simon	2.06 m (6 ft 9 in)	118 kg (260 lb)

Head coach

- (South Korea) Park Myung-soo

Legend

- (C) Team captain
- Injured
