= Min-kyu =

- Hangul: 민규
- RR: Mingyu
- MR: Min'gyu

Min-kyu, also spelled Min-gyu, is a Korean given name. It was the eighth-most popular name for baby boys in South Korea in 1990.

People with this name include:

== Entertainers ==
- Brian Joo (Korean name Joo Min-kyoo, born 1981), Korean American R&B singer, member of Fly to the Sky
- Yoo Min-kyu (born 1987), South Korean actor
- Kim Min-gue (born 1994), South Korean actor
- Kim Mingyu (born 1997), South Korean singer and rapper, member of Seventeen
- Kim Min-kyu (entertainer) (born 2001), South Korean actor, singer, MC and model

== Sportspeople ==
- Kim Min-gyu (table tennis) (1977–2017), South Korean para table tennis player
- Kim Min-kyu (judoka) (born 1982), South Korean judoka
- Kim Min-kyu (luger) (born 1983), South Korean luger
- Cho Min-gyu (born 1988), South Korean golfer
- Lee Min-kyu (born 1989), South Korean football defender
- Joo Min-kyu (born 1990), South Korean football striker and midfielder
- Kim Min-kyu (fencer) (born 1990), South Korean fencer
- Song Min-kyu (born 1990), South Korean tennis player
- Choi Min-kyu (born 1992), South Korean sprint canoer
- Lee Min-gyu (born 1992), South Korean volleyball player
- Cha Min-kyu (born 1993), South Korean speed skater
- Park Min-gyu (footballer) (born 1995), South Korean football defender
- Jang Min-gyu (born 1999), South Korean football defender in Japan
- Kim Min-gyu (baseball) (born 1999), South Korean baseball pitcher
- Song Min-kyu (footballer) (born 1999), South Korean football forward
- Kim Min-kyu (golfer) (born 2001), South Korean golfer

== Others ==
- Park Min-gyu (born 1968), South Korean writer

== See also ==
- List of the most popular given names in South Korea
- Mingyu (Chinese name)
