= Feng Chuanhan =

Chinese orthopedic surgeon and professor (1914–2019)

Feng Chuanhan (Chinese: 冯传汉; 26 January 1914 – 16 June 2019) was a Chinese orthopaedic surgeon and professor. He served as Vice President of Beijing Medical College and President of Peking University People's Hospital. A pioneer in the research of bone cancer in China, he was awarded the Ho Leung Ho Lee Prize and the Lifetime Achievement Award of the Chinese Medical Association.

== Biography ==
Feng was born on 26 January 1914 in Hankou, Hubei, Republic of China, with his ancestral home in Panyu, Guangdong. In 1932, he entered the pre-medical program of Yenching University, where he earned his bachelor of science degree. He earned his MD in 1940 from Peking Union Medical College. From 1949 to 1950, he received training in England in orthopaedics and hand surgery.

In 1942, Feng began working at Peking Central Hospital (now Peking University People's Hospital). He established the Department of Osteology at the hospital and served as its director, and pioneered the research of bone cancer and soft tissue tumours in China. He later served as president of the hospital. From 1980 to 1985, he served as Vice President of Beijing Medical College (now Peking University Health Science Center).

Feng was awarded the Ho Leung Ho Lee Prize for Medical Sciences and Materia Medica, and the Lifetime Achievement Award of the Chinese Medical Association.

Feng died in Beijing on 16 June 2019, at the age of 105.
