= Wang Hanru =

Chinese military officer and politician (1938–2019)

Wang Hanru (Chinese: 王汉儒; April 1938 – 9 June 2019) was a Chinese military officer and politician. A major general of the People's Liberation Army, he served as deputy commander of the Xinjiang Production and Construction Corps and vice chairman of the Xinjiang Chinese People's Political Consultative Conference (CPPCC).

== Biography ==
Wang was born in April 1938 in Qitai County, Xinjiang, Republic of China. He enlisted in the People's Liberation Army in March 1955 and joined the Chinese Communist Party in December 1958. In May 1960, he was appointed a platoon commander in the 1st Mounted Regiment of the Xinjiang Military District.

Wang's platoon was designated a "model platoon" for its performance in suppressing an ethnic rebellion in the Altyn-Tagh Mountains. He subsequently rose through the ranks of the PLA, becoming a division commander in Ürümqi in May 1983 and commander of the Altay Military Subdistrict in 1986.

In 1993, he was awarded the rank of major general and appointed deputy commander of the Xinjiang Production and Construction Corps, In January 1998, he was appointed deputy chairman of the Xinjiang Chinese People's Political Consultative Conference (CPPCC). He retired in June 2004.

Wang died on 9 June 2019 in Ürümqi, at the age of 81.
