= Su Shuyang =

Chinese writer (1938–2019)

Su Shuyang (Chinese: 苏叔阳; 1938 – 16 July 2019), who also used the pen names Shu Yang (舒扬) and Yu Pingfu (余平夫), was a Chinese playwright, novelist, and screenwriter. He also wrote the bestselling non-fiction work A Reader on China, which sold 15 million copies.

== Life and career ==
Su Shuyang was born in 1938 in Baoding, Hebei, Republic of China. After graduating in 1960 from Renmin University of China with a degree in history, he taught at several universities including Beijing College of Chinese Medicine.

After the end of the Cultural Revolution, Su wrote his first play, The Story of Loyal Hearts (丹心谱, 1978). A representative work in the "anti-Gang of Four" genre, the play depicts a doctor dedicated to researching a new medicine despite sabotage by the Gang's followers. It was highly popular and launched Su's writing career.

Following the success of his first play, Su was hired by Beijing Film Studio as a screenwriter. He wrote the screenplay for the film Sunset Street (夕照街), which documents the changes to the lives of Beijingers during the reform and opening era. The film resonated with the audience and was a major success. He subsequently wrote a number of screenplays and novels, including Homeland (故土).

Su's second play, Neighbours (左邻右舍, 1980), continued the tradition of the celebrated writer Lao She in depicting the lives of ordinary people of Beijing. It centres on a retired worker who helps the sick, the elderly, and the downtrodden, such as a former "rightist" falsely denounced for criticizing the Chinese Communist Party (CCP).

Su's tragedy, Taiping Lake, features Lao She himself. It depicts the last day of the writer's life (24 August 1966), when he drowned himself in the lake after being tortured by the Red Guards. In the play, Lao She wanders around Taiping Lake, converses with the tragic characters he has condemned to death in his works, and contemplates the tragic irony of his own life: his devotion to the CCP and the charges against him of being an anti-CCP counterrevolutionary.

In 1998, Su published A Reader on China (中国读本), a 150,000-character non-fiction book on Chinese civilization. It became his best-selling work, with 15 million copies sold. The book was well received at the 2005 Frankfurt Book Fair and Bertelsmann published its German translation. In 2008, he published A Reader on Tibet (西藏读本), which he had spent three years researching and writing.

== Death ==
Su suffered from cancer and underwent surgery to remove part of his stomach, lung, and spleen. He was prevented from writing new novels and plays in his later life due to poor health. He died on 16 July 2019, in Beijing, at the age of 81.
