= Fang Fukang =

Chinese physicist and systems scientist (1935–2019)

Fang Fukang (Chinese: 方福康; 28 February 1935 – 4 February 2019) was a Chinese physicist and systems scientist. He established the study of systems theory at Beijing Normal University and served as president of the university from 1989 to 1995.

== Biography ==
Fang was born on 28 February 1935 in Shanghai, Republic of China, with his ancestral home in Dinghai, Zhejiang. He graduated from the Department of Physics of Beijing Normal University in 1956, and researched and taught nuclear physics afterwards.

In the 1970s, he studied at the Université libre de Bruxelles in Belgium under the Nobel Prize laureate Ilya Prigogine, and earned his PhD in 1980. After returning to China, he introduced Prigogine's dissipative system theory to China, and established the study of systems theory at Beijing Normal University.

From May 1989 to May 1995, Fang served as president of Beijing Normal University. He also served as party secretary of the university.

Fang died on 4 February 2019 in Beijing, at the age of 83.
