= Gao Changqing =

Chinese cardiac surgeon (1960–2019)

Gao Changqing (Chinese: 高长青; 1 January 1960 – 8 January 2019) was a Chinese cardiac surgeon who performed the first robotic cardiac surgery in China. He served as Vice President of the People's Liberation Army General Hospital and held the military rank of major general. He was an academician or fellow of the Chinese Academy of Engineering, the Royal College of Surgeons of Edinburgh, and the Académie Nationale de Médecine.

== Biography ==
Gao was born in Baotou, Inner Mongolia on 1 January 1960. He entered Baotou Medical College in 1979 and graduated in August 1984. In 1988, he passed the English Proficiency Test with the highest score in Inner Mongolia, and earned a government scholarship to study abroad.

In March 1991, Gao began his studies abroad at the National Autonomous University of Mexico. After earning his M.D. in May 1996, he returned to China and was recruited by the People's Liberation Army (PLA) to work as a surgeon at the PLA General Hospital (301 Hospital) in Beijing. He later became Director of the Department of Cardiovascular Surgery and eventually Vice President of the hospital. In January 2007, he successfully performed the first fully robotic cardiac surgery in China. Over the course of his career, Gao performed more than 5,000 surgeries.

He served as an editor of more than ten medical journals in China and abroad, including the Chinese Journal of Surgery. He published over 300 scientific papers and the book Robotic Cardiac Surgery (Springer 2014, ISBN 978-94-007-7659-3), written in English.

He was elected a member of the Chinese Academy of Engineering (2015), and as a foreign fellow of the Royal College of Surgeons of Edinburgh in the UK and the Académie Nationale de Médecine in France. He also held the military rank of major general.

Gao was a recipient of the State Science and Technology Progress Award (First Class), the Ho Leung Ho Lee Prize, and many other government and military awards.

Gao died in Beijing on 8 January 2019, aged 59.
