= Yang Yang (tenor) =

Chinese operatic tenor (1974/75–2019)

Yang Yang (Chinese: 杨阳; 1974/75 – 10 June 2019) was a Chinese operatic tenor and music professor at the Capital Normal University in Beijing. He won top prizes at four Italian opera festivals. including the Pesaro Festival, and was named one of China's top ten tenors in 2012 by China Central Television. He died by suicide in 2019, at the age of 44.

== Biography ==
Yang was a Manchu. He studied piano and singing from a young age, and was admitted to the People's Liberation Army Academy of Art. After earning a bachelor's degree in bel canto, he continued his studies at China Conservatory of Music, where he obtained a master's degree in Chinese folk singing.

After graduation, Yang became a tenor in the entertainment troupe of the People's Liberation Army Air Force. In 2005, he won the top prize at a UNESCO opera festival in Italy. In 2007, he won the 12th Wenhua Prize (文华表演奖), China's top prize for performing arts.

In 2008, Yang moved to Italy to study and perform. The following year, he won the top prizes at three Italian opera festivals, including the Pesaro Festival.

After returning to China, Yang became a music professor at the Capital Normal University in Beijing, and performed with the National Centre for the Performing Arts, the China National Opera, and the Shanghai Grand Theatre. He pioneered the combination of bel canto with traditional Chinese singing techniques, and performed Chinese folk songs in Italian. In 2012, he was named one of China's top ten tenors by China Central Television. Throughout his career, he performed in dozens of countries and held more than 20 solo concerts.

On 10 June 2019, Yang died at his home at the age of 44. According to his colleagues at the China National Opera, he jumped to his death from the 26th floor of his building. He reportedly suffered from depression. He died soon after the birth of his second child.
