= Wang Yening =

Chinese physicist (1926–2019)

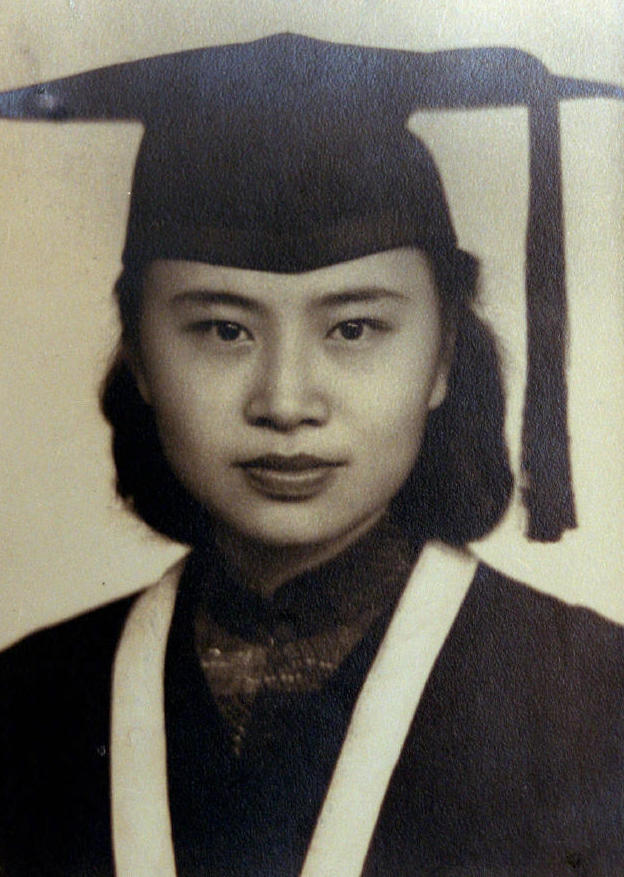
- Wang at her graduation from National Central University (1949)
- Born: 14 October 1926; Anqing, Anhui, China
- Died: 22 February 2019 (aged 92); Nanjing, Jiangsu, China
- Education: National Central University
- Spouse: Lin Xingshan
- Awards: National Science and Technology Conference Award (1978), State Natural Science Award (Second Class, 1982), Golden Ox Award (1994), Ho Leung Ho Lee Prize in Physics (2000)
- Scientific career
- Fields: Condensed matter physics, high-temperature superconductivity
- Workplaces: Nanjing University

Chinese name
- Traditional Chinese: 王業寧
- Simplified Chinese: 王业宁
Transcriptions
Standard Mandarin
- Hanyu Pinyin: Wáng Yèníng
- Wade–Giles: Wang Yeh-ning

Wang Yening (Chinese: 王业宁; 14 October 1926 – 22 February 2019), also known as Ye-Ning (Y. N.) Wang, was a Chinese physicist. She was an educator with a specialization in condensed matter physics. She spent her entire career at Nanjing University and was elected an academician of the Chinese Academy of Sciences in 1991. She was a recipient of the State Natural Science Award (Second Class) and the Ho Leung Ho Lee Prize in Physics.

== Biography ==
Wang was born on 14 October 1926 in Anqing, Anhui, Republic of China. She studied at the Department of Physics of National Central University (NCU) in Nanjing from 1945 to 1949, and became an assistant professor of Nanjing University (reorganized from the former NCU) in 1950. She spent her entire career at Nanjing University, and was later promoted to lecturer, associate professor, and eventually professor.

In 1953, Wang studied metal physics and internal friction under Ke T'ing-sui (Ge Tingsui) at the Institute of Metal Research of the Chinese Academy of Sciences. She returned to Nanjing University a year later and helped Cheng Kaijia and Shi Shiyuan establish China's first X-ray metal physics program.

Wang's research focuses included general phase transitions, behaviours of crystallographic surface defects, superconductors, and other areas of condensed matter physics. She published more than 200 scientific papers and was one of the world's top 150 authors in high-temperature superconductivity in the 1990s. She pioneered "Wang's theory" for her coupling relaxation theory pertaining to the collective relaxation process of defects in alloys.

For her achievements, Wang was conferred the National Science and Technology Conference Award (1978), the State Natural Science Award (Second Class) in 1982, the Golden Ox Award (1994), and the Ho Leung Ho Lee Prize in Physics (2000). She was elected an academician of the Chinese Academy of Sciences in 1991.

In a career spanning more than half a century, she educated nearly 100 graduate students who earned master's or Ph.D. degrees as well as postdoctoral researchers. In 1993, she was named one of the "top ten women science and technology educators" by the Jiangsu Provincial Government.

== Personal life ==
Wang was married to Lin Xingshan (林醒山; 1925–2016), who was a professor and Chair of the Civil Engineering Department of Southeast University. During the Cultural Revolution (1966–1976), Lin was denounced as a capitalist roader and imprisoned. Wang was forced to perform hard labour on a farm and on construction sites in Nanjing, while also raising their children on her own.

Wang died on 22 February 2019 in Nanjing, at the age of 92.
