= Cheng Zhiqing =

Chinese chemist and politician (1934–2019)

Cheng Zhiqing (Chinese: 程誌青; July 1934 – 12 February 2019) was a Chinese chemist and politician. She served as vice chairwoman of Guangdong People's Congress and vice chairwoman of the Revolutionary Committee of the Chinese Kuomintang (RCCK).

== Biography ==
Cheng was born in July 1934 in Qingdao, Shandong, Republic of China, with her ancestral home in Yingcheng, Hubei. She studied at Peking University from 1952 to 1953, and was then selected to study in the Soviet Union. She studied chemistry at Herzen University from 1954 to 1956, and then at the University of Leningrad from 1956 to 1959.

She returned to China in 1959 and worked at the Institute of Chemistry of the Chinese Academy of Sciences until 1973. In that year, she was transferred to the Guangdong Provincial Institute of Testing and Analysis (广东省测试分析研究所). She worked there until 1989, rising from assistant researcher to researcher, and eventually vice president. From 1982 to 1984 she was a visiting scholar at the Chemistry Department of the University of Utah in the United States.

In 1989, she was appointed vice director of the Science Committee of Guangdong Province. After 1993, she served as vice chairwoman of Guangdong People's Congress. She joined the Revolutionary Committee of the Chinese Kuomintang (RCCK) in 1986. She served as chairwoman of RCCK's Guangdong Provincial Committee and vice chairwoman of the RCCK Central Committee for three terms (8th, 9th, and 10th).

Cheng died on 12 February 2019 in Guangzhou, at the age of 84.
