= Sun Wei (painter) =

Sun Wei (Chinese: 孫位; fl. late 9th century) was a Chinese painter during the late Tang dynasty. He was originally from Kuaiji Commandery. During the upheavals of the 880s, he went from the capital Chang'an to Chengdu, probably with or following Emperor Xizong of Tang.

His painting "Gao Yi Tu" (高逸圖) depicts the Seven Sages of the Bamboo Grove. It is currently preserved in Shanghai Museum, but only four sages can be seen in the extant picture.

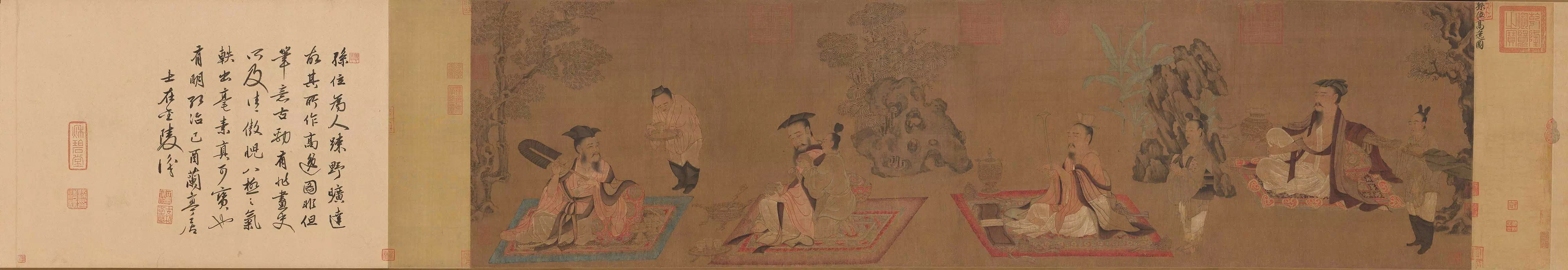
Sun Wei's "Gao Yi Tu", Shanghai Museum, Shanghai. Depicted "Sages" (L-R): Ruan Ji, Liu Ling, Wang Rong, and Shan Tao, each with his personal servant.
