= Yu Pufan =

Chinese computer pioneer (1923–2019)

- 虞浦帆
- Born: 1923; Ningbo, Zhejiang, Republic of China
- Died: 27 June 2019 (aged 95–96); Shanghai, China
- Education: University of Shanghai
- Scientific career
- Fields: Computer Science workplaces =

Yu Pufan (Chinese: 虞浦帆; 1923 – 27 June 2019) was a Chinese computer pioneer. He invented the earliest dot matrix printing method for Chinese characters in 1962 and developed then China's fastest computer in 1964, which was used in the explosion of China's first nuclear bomb. He served as Vice President of East China Institute of Computer Technology.

== Biography ==
Yu was born in 1923 in Ningbo, Zhejiang, Republic of China. He graduated from the Department of Physics of the University of Shanghai in 1945.

In December 1959, Yu developed Type-103, the first vacuum tube computer in Shanghai. In August 1962, he invented the earliest dot matrix printing method for Chinese characters, and was awarded China's first National Invention Award by Mao Zedong and Nie Rongzhen.

In 1964, Yu developed the J-501, then China's fastest vacuum tube computer capable of performing 50,000 calculations per second. It was used in astronomy, meteorology, and especially in the explosion of China's first nuclear bomb in the same year.

Yu was a committee member of the predecessor of the China Computer Federation from 1962 to 1966. He also served as Vice President of East China Institute of Computer Technology.

On 27 June 2019, Yu died at Huadong Hospital in Shanghai at the age of 96.
