= Zhang Baifa =

Chinese politician (1935–2019)

Zhang Baifa (Chinese: 张百发; 1935 – 5 July 2019) was a Chinese politician and a construction worker by trade. He became a protégé of Wan Li and rose to the position of Vice Mayor and Executive Vice Mayor of Beijing, serving from 1983 to 1995. Zhang was in charge of major construction projects in Beijing, including those in preparation for the 1990 Asian Games, and led the city's unsuccessful bid for the 2000 Summer Olympics.

== Early life and career in construction ==
Zhang was born in 1935 in Xianghe County, Hebei, Republic of China. In 1948, he moved with his father, a weaver, to Beijing. Owing to poverty, he was unable to attend school and worked as his father's assistant.

With the founding of the People's Republic of China in 1949, Beijing regained its status as the capital of China, and the new Communist government initiated a large number of construction projects. In 1951, Zhang became an apprentice rebar worker at the age of 16. He and his friend, carpenter Li Ruihuan, worked together in the construction of the Great Hall of the People and solved a number of technical issues. After work, he took adult education courses at night, and eventually earned a correspondence education degree from the Renmin University of China.

Zhang was named a "model worker" of Beijing in 1954, and joined the Chinese Communist Party in the same year. He was elected a delegate to the 4th National People's Congress, and the Beijing leader Deng Tuo called him a "people's hero".

From 1958 to 1966, when Wan Li served as Vice Mayor of Beijing in charge of construction, Li Ruihuan and Zhang Baifa were his key assistants and described in Chinese media as the "Heng and Ha Generals" of Wan. However, Wan was purged when the Cultural Revolution erupted in 1966, and Zhang was also persecuted as his protégé.

== Vice Mayor of Beijing ==
After the end of Cultural Revolution, Zhang was rehabilitated and appointed Vice Mayor of Beijing in 1983. He later served as Executive Vice Mayor until his retirement in 1998. During his tenure, he was in charge of major construction projects in Beijing, such as those in preparation for the 1990 Asian Games.

Zhang led Beijing's unsuccessful bid for the 2000 Summer Olympics. In July 1993, the United States House of Representatives passed a resolution urging the International Olympic Committee to reject Beijing's bid because of China's human rights abuses. In reaction, Zhang told Australia's Special Broadcasting Service that China might boycott the 1996 Atlanta Olympic Games as revenge. In his interview with the television station, he praised American people but called the US Congress "stupid". He Zhenliang, head of the Chinese Olympic Committee, denied that Zhang's remarks represented official Chinese policy.

Because of his humble background and approachable personality, Zhang was praised in Chinese media as a "people's mayor". However, scientist Fang Lizhi openly criticized him in 1985 for travelling to the United States as a member of an official scientific delegation for high energy physics.

== Later life and death ==
Zhang and his wife Wang Shulan (王淑兰) had a son and a daughter. By coincidence, his wife shared the same name and birthdate as the wife of his friend and colleague Li Ruihuan, who rose to the Politburo Standing Committee of the Chinese Communist Party.

Zhang died in Beijing on 5 July 2019, at the age of 84.
