= Hu Maozhou =

Chinese politician (1928–2019)

Hu Maozhou (Chinese: 胡懋洲; April 1928 – 5 July 2019) was a Chinese politician. He served as Mayor of Chengdu, the capital of Sichuan province, from 1981 to 1988. He was also a delegate to the 7th and 8th National People's Congresses.

== Biography ==
Hu was born in April 1928 in Taihe County, Jiangxi, Republic of China. He attended National Central University in Nanjing.

Hu joined the work force in June 1949 and the Chinese Communist Party in March 1950. He worked in the Chongqing Railway Bureau and later Sichuan Chemical Factory, eventually rising to head of the factory.

In December 1980, Hu was appointed party secretary (then under first party secretary) of Chengdu, the capital of Sichuan province. In September 1981, he was appointed Mayor of Chengdu, serving until October 1988. His tenure encompassed a key period during the reform and opening era, when Chengdu, along with the rest of China, was experiencing a transition from a planned economy to a market economy.

From November 1988 to November 1993, Hu served as Chairman of the Chengdu People's Congress. He was also a delegate to the 7th National People's Congress and the 8th National People's Congress. He retired in March 1994.

Hu died on 5 July 2019 in Chengdu, at the age of 91.
