= Wei Maowen =

Chinese politician

- 韦茂文

Governor of Qiannan Buyei and Miao Autonomous Prefecture
- In office 1956–1966
- Preceded by: Position established
- Succeeded by: Unknown

Representative at the Second and Third National People's Congresses
- In office 1959–1975

Personal details
- Born: 1924 Zhenfeng County, Guizhou, China
- Died: March 10, 2019 (aged 95) Duyun, Guizhou, China
- Party: Chinese Communist Party

Chinese name
- Simplified Chinese: 韦茂文
Transcriptions
Standard Mandarin
- Hanyu Pinyin: Wéi Màowén

Wei Maowen (Chinese: 韦茂文; 1924 - 10 March 2019) was a Chinese politician of Bouyei ethnicity who served as the first governor of Qiannan Buyei and Miao Autonomous Prefecture following its establishment in 1956.

== Early life ==
Wei Maowen was born in 1924 in Zhenfeng County in Guizhou Province. He began his political career in his home county, serving as the county magistrate of Zhenfeng.

== Political career ==
In May 1956, he was appointed Director of the Preparatory Committee for the Qiannan Prefecture. Later that year, in November 1956, he became the first Governor of the newly established Qiannan Buyei and Miao Autonomous Prefecture, a position he held until 1966. Wei Maowen played a pivotal role in the establishment and early governance of Qiannan Buyei and Miao Autonomous Prefecture, which was founded in 1956. Located in south-central Guizhou, the prefecture serves as a critical gateway connecting southwest China to southern regions, including South China and Lingnan. Often referred to as Guizhou's 'southern gate', Qiannan is strategically positioned as the province's closest access point to coastal regions such as Guangxi and Guangdong. He also oversaw the publication of the prefecture's newspaper Qiannan Daily.

In 1966, Wei was appointed Deputy Director of the Qiannan Prefecture Revolutionary Committee. He later served as the Director of the Qiannan Prefecture People's Congress Standing Committee from 1981, overseeing its 7th and 8th sessions. Additionally, Wei represented Guizhou as a delegate to the 2nd and 3rd National People's Congresses.

== Later life and legacy ==
In 2016, Wei was awarded a commemorative badge by then Party Secretary of Guizhou Chen Min'er on the 60th anniversary celebration of the founding of Qiannan Buyi and Miao Autonomous Prefecture.

Wei died due to illness on 10 March 2019 in Duyun, at the age of 95. A farewell ceremony was held on the morning of March 12, 2019, in Duyun. The event was attended by prominent figures including Secretary of the Qiannan Prefecture Party Committee Tang Dezhi, Chairman of the Qiannan Prefecture Political Consultative Conference Wei Minglu, leaders of the prefecture's four major administrative bodies, retired officials and representatives from provincial and county units in Guizhou. Representatives from Zhenfeng County in Qianxinan Buyei and Miao Autonomous Prefecture also attended to pay their respects.

Government offices
Preceded by Position established	Governor of Qiannan Buyei and Miao Autonomous Prefecture; 1956–1966	Succeeded by Unknown
