= Feng Shunhua =

Chinese economist and academic (1934–2019)

- 冯舜华
- Born: May 1934; Shanghai, China
- Died: 5 May 2019 (aged 84–85); Shenyang, Liaoning, China
- Occupation: Economist

Academic background
- Education: Dongbei University of Finance and Economics; Beijing Normal University

Academic work
- Discipline: Economics
- Sub-discipline: World economy
- Institutions: Liaoning University

Chinese name
- Traditional Chinese: 馮順華
- Simplified Chinese: 冯舜华
Transcriptions
Standard Mandarin
- Hanyu Pinyin: Féng Shùnhuá

Feng Shunhua (Chinese: 冯舜华; May 1934 – 5 May 2019) was a Chinese economist and expert on Russian and Eastern European affairs. She was professor and Chair of World Economic Research at Liaoning University. She was a delegate to the National Congress of the Chinese Communist Party.

== Biography ==
Feng was born in Shanghai, Republic of China in May 1934. She graduated from Beijing Normal University in July 1957, and worked in Warsaw, Poland for a year.

Feng was a professor at Liaoning University, where she served as Chair of World Economic Research and Vice President of the Institute of Economic Research. She also served as Vice President of the China World Economics Society.

Her research was focused on the world economy, comparative economics, and Russian and Eastern European affairs. She published many research works and supervised more than 60 master's and doctoral students.

Feng was a delegate to the 13th and 14th National Congress of the Chinese Communist Party. She also served as an advisor to the national and provincial governments.

Feng died on 5 May 2019 in Shenyang, at the age of 85.
