= Huang Ziqing =

Chinese chemist (1900–1982)

Huang Ziqing (Chinese: 黄子卿; January 2, 1900 – July 23, 1982) was a Chinese chemist, who was a member of the Chinese Academy of Sciences.
