= He Bingsong =

Chinese legal scholar (1932–2019)

- 何秉松
- Born: 1932; Guiping, Guangxi, China
- Died: 11 February 2019 (aged 86–87); Beijing, China
- Education: Peking University
- Occupation: Legal scholar

He Bingsong (Chinese: 何秉松; pinyin: Hé Bǐngsōng; Wade–Giles: Ho Ping-sung; 1932 – 11 February 2019) was a Chinese legal scholar.

== Life and career ==
He was born in 1932 in Guiping, Guangxi, Republic of China. He had four brothers. After graduating from Peking University in 1952, he taught at the China University of Political Science and Law. After the Cultural Revolution, he served as a lawyer in the trial of Lin Biao and the Gang of Four counter-revolutionary groups.

On 1 February 2010, he was awarded the Legion of Honour by the French government.

He died in Beijing, aged 87.
