= Peking University People's Hospital =

北京大学人民医院 Peking University People's Hospital
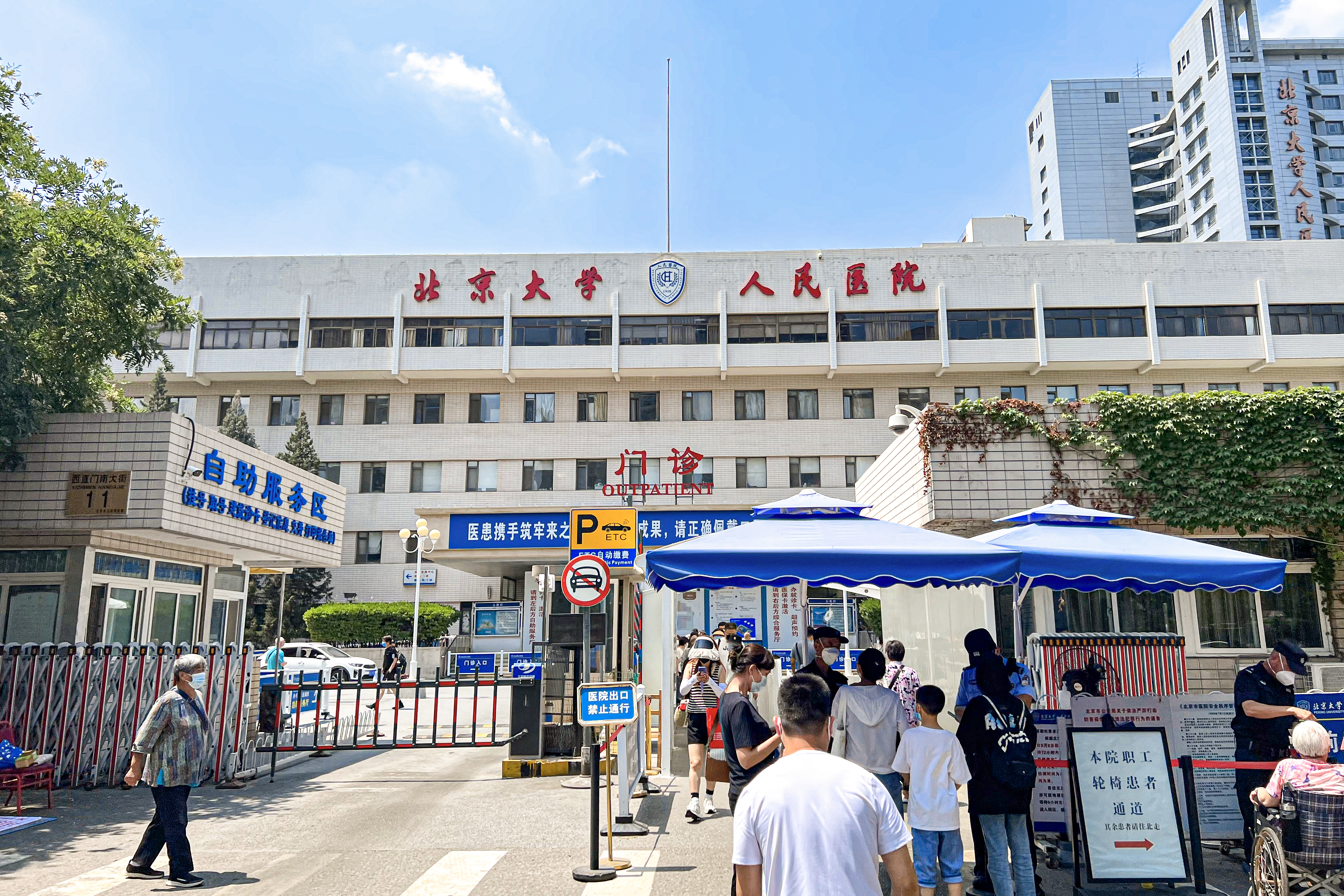
- East Gate

Geography
- Location: 11 Xizhimen South Street, Xicheng District, Beijing, China
- Coordinates: 39.936713°N 116.354714°E

Organisation
- Type: Public, Teaching Hospital
- Affiliated university: Peking University Health Science Center

History
- Founded: January 27, 1918; 108 years ago

Links
- Website: https://english.pkuph.cn/index.html
- Lists: Hospitals in China

The Peking University People's Hospital is a Grade A tertiary hospital which also serves as the Second Clinical Medical School of Peking University. Founded in 1918 as the first general hospital financed and operated by Chinese nationals, the hospital has developed into a large comprehensive hospital integrating medical treatment, teaching and scientific research.

== History ==
The predecessor of Peking University People's Hospital was the "Peking Central Hospital", which was officially opened on January 27, 1918, with Wu Lien-teh as its first president. The hospital was initiated by Cao Rulin, with funding from more than 20 people. It was the first modern hospital founded and operated by Chinese people.

In 1946, Peking Central Hospital was renamed "Central Hospital". In 1950, it was donated to the Chinese Ministry of Health. In 1956, it was renamed "Beijing People's Hospital".

In 1958, it became the Second Affiliated Hospital of Beijing Medical College.

In 1985, it was renamed "Beijing Medical University People's Hospital" (or the Second Clinical Medical school of Beijing Medical University).

In 1991, the Xizhimen Campus was founded.

On March 26, 1994, the Ministry of Health approved it as a Grade A tertiary hospital.

In 2000, with the merger of Beijing Medical University into Peking University, Beijing Medical University People's Hospital was renamed "Peking University People's Hospital" (and the "Peking University Second Clinical Medical School").

In 2013, the successful reform of Peking University People's Hospital became a main case on Harvard Business Publishing

In 2014, Peking University People's Hospital Qinghe Campus Officially Opened.

In 2019, the hospital was authorized to build the National Clinical Research Center for Hematologic Disease and the National Center for Trauma Medicine.

In 2021, the Tongzhou Campus was founded, with a daily outpatient volume of up to 4,000 people. In the same year, Qingdao City and Peking University People's Hospital jointly established Peking University People's Hospital Qingdao Hospital.

In 2023, Peking University People's Hospital set up a branch in Xiong'an, Hebei; to have a 1,000-bed capacity, and function as a national medical center.

== Current situation ==
=== Medical treatment ===
Currently, there are 1,300 physicians, 2,466 nurses, and 1,076 supporting staff working in three campuses, with over 2,600 beds in Beijing. Annually, they serve about 153,580 inpatients, 3,378,525 outpatient visits and 66,030 surgical procedures.

=== Teaching ===
As the Second Clinical Medical School of Peking University, the hospital trains an average of more than 1,000 students of various types and nearly 1,800 visiting doctors and resident physicians in Beijing each year.

=== Research ===
Peking University People's Hospital is also active in medical research and have published quite a number of academic papers, among which 164 papers are listed in Nature Index for the Time frame of 1 December 2024 - 30 November 2025.

== Campuses ==
=== Baita Temple Campus ===
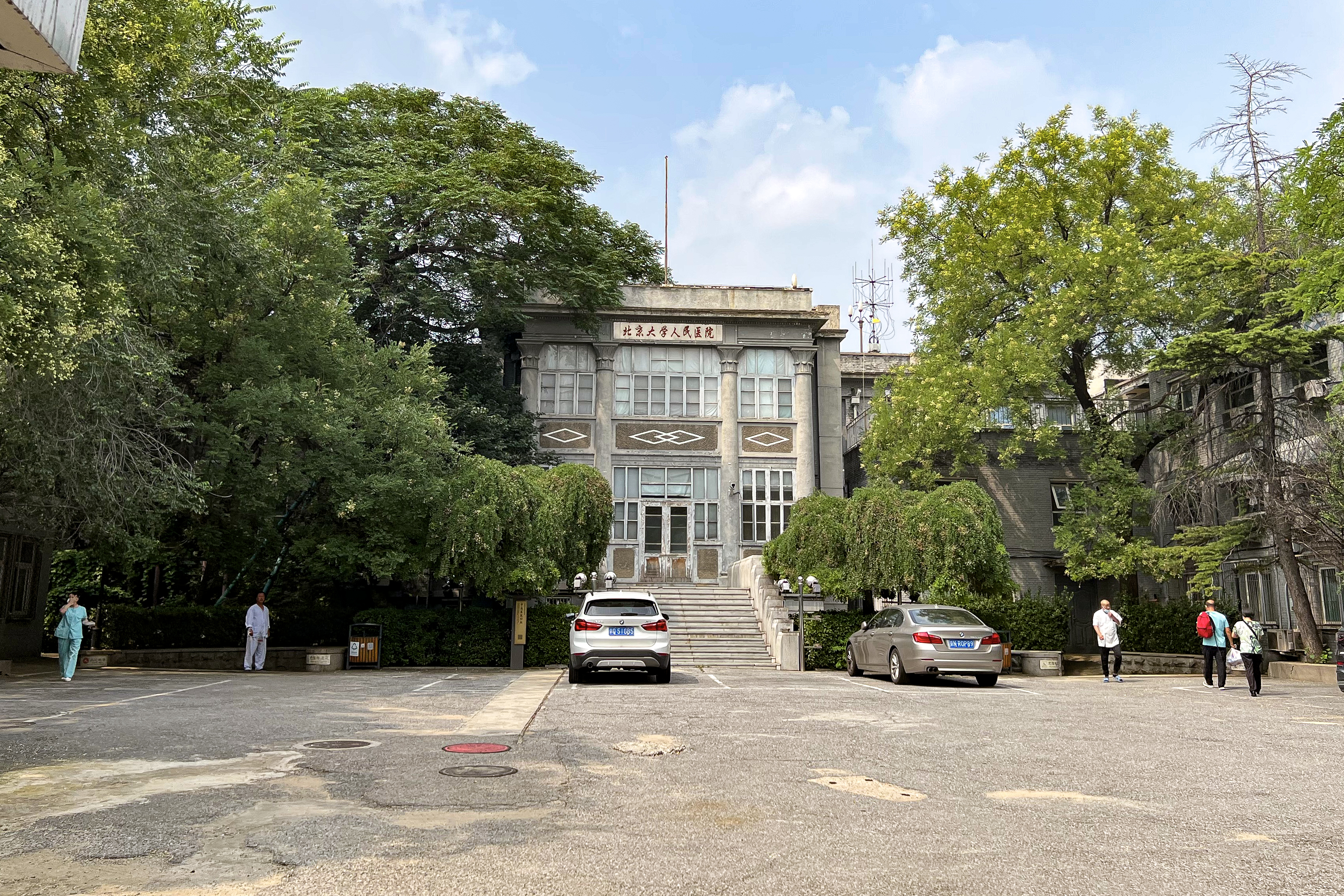
Former Site of Central Hospital, Cultural Relics Protection Unit of Xicheng District, Beijing

The former site of Peking University People's Hospital at No. 133, Fuchengmen Inner Street, Xicheng District is now a cultural relics protection unit of Xicheng District. The building faces south and is a reinforced concrete structure, a typical American-style hospital building. The building is 80 meters long from east to west and 27 meters wide at its widest point. The plan is symmetrical and butterfly-shaped, with brick column facade decorations. The windows on the front building are arched, with flat arches and round arches. The central part protrudes forward, and the east and west ends are swallowtail-shaped. There are three short wings behind the building. There was originally a stone tablet with the inscription "Record of the Founding of the Central Hospital". In 1946, a ward floor was added to each of the two wings of the main building. In 1953, the two short wings behind the main building were expanded to three stories. The original main building was four stories above ground with a basement. In the 1980s, a fire broke out in the main building during renovation, destroying one floor. Therefore, it was changed to the current three stories above ground.

=== Xizhimen Campus ===
On September 3, 2020, Peking University People's Hospital deployed "Internet-based" emergency care: shortening emergency response time and avoiding secondary referrals.

The Xizhimen Campus is located at No. 11 Xizhimen South Street, Xicheng District. It was established in 1991, with a building area of more than 60,000 square meters and 690 beds.

=== Qinghe Campus ===
Qinghe Campus (also known as "Qinghe Hospital") is located at No. 36, South Section of Changping Road, Haidian District, covering an area of 20,000 square meters and a building area of 75,000 square meters. It was officially put into use on December 29, 2013. This campus is a non-profit medical institution combining social capital sponsorship and public hospital management.

=== Tongzhou Campus ===
The Tongzhou Campus of Peking University People's Hospital is located at the intersection of Huocheng West Road and Huoma Road. It has a total construction area of 119,888 square meters and consists of two separate buildings: a main medical building and an administrative and research building. It has 800 beds. There are three major centers: a trauma emergency center, a prenatal and obstetrics and gynecology center, and a tumor radiotherapy and chemotherapy center. The Tongzhou Campus was completed at the end of October 2020.

=== Shijiazhuang Hospital ===
On the morning of June 26, 2022, the unveiling ceremony of Peking University People's Hospital Shijiazhuang Hospital was held at the Jianhua Campus of Shijiazhuang People's Hospital.

== See also ==
- Peking University Health Science Center
- Peking University
- List of hospitals in China
