= Li Zuixiong =

Chinese conservation scientist (1941–2019)

Li Zuixiong (Chinese: 李最雄; 1941 – 2 July 2019) was a Chinese conservation scientist. An expert in the conservation of ancient murals, cave temples, and architecture, he served as vice president of the Dunhuang Research Academy and as an adjunct professor at Lanzhou University.

== Biography ==
Li was born in Lanzhou, Gansu, China in 1941. He graduated from the department of chemistry of Northwest Normal University in 1964. In 1991, he earned his Ph.D. in conservation science from Tokyo University of the Arts, and became the first Chinese person to earn a doctorate in the field.

He worked for more than 50 years in the conservation of ancient murals, cave temples, and architecture, especially in Dunhuang. He participated in more than 50 major conservation projects, including three major Buddhist temples of Tibet and the Jiaohe ruins in Xinjiang. After turning 60, he made 18 trips to Tibet for the conservation work of the Potala Palace, the Sakya Monastery, and Norbulingka.

Li served as vice president of the Dunhuang Research Academy and taught as an adjunct professor at Lanzhou University, where he advised 11 PhD's. He published more than 200 research papers and 11 monographs, and was awarded over 30 patents. He won three national science and technology prizes and more than ten ministerial or provincial prizes.

Partly because of his frequently trips to the high-altitude Tibetan Plateau, his health deteriorated. He suffered from heart problems, for which he had a coronary stent surgery. He died on 2 July 2019 in Lanzhou, at the age of 78. He had a son, Li Wei (李巍).
