= Wang Buxuan =

Chinese scientist in engineering thermophysics

- Born: 5 February 1922; Wuxi, Jiangsu, China
- Died: 31 August 2019 (aged 97); Beijing, China
- Education: National Southwestern Associated University; Purdue University
- Awards: Ho Leung Ho Lee Prize (1998)
- Scientific career
- Fields: Thermodynamics, solar power, heat transfer, thermal engineering
- Workplaces: Tsinghua University

Chinese name
- Traditional Chinese: 王補宣
- Simplified Chinese: 王补宣
Transcriptions
Standard Mandarin
- Hanyu Pinyin: Wáng Bǔxuān
- Wade–Giles: Wang^{2} Pu^{3}-hsüan^{1}
- IPA: [wǎŋ pù.ɕwǎn]

Wang Buxuan (5 February 1922 – 31 August 2019), also known as Bu-Xuan Wang and Pu-Hsuan Wang, was a Chinese thermal physicist and engineer, considered a pioneer in the field of engineering thermodynamics in China. He established the engineering thermodynamics program at Tsinghua University in 1957 and the China Solar Power Society in 1979. He was elected an academician of the Chinese Academy of Sciences in 1980.

== Early life and education ==
Wang was born 5 February 1922 in Wuxi, Jiangsu, Republic of China. He earned a B.S. from the National Southwestern Associated University in 1943 and an M.S. in mechanical engineering from Purdue University in the United States in 1949.

== Career ==
When the People's Republic of China was established in 1949, Wang gave up his doctoral studies and returned to China. He taught at Peking University before moving to Tsinghua University, where he established the engineering thermodynamics program in 1957. Answering a national need, Wang spent 1963 to 1966 researching the synthesis of ammonia at a major chemical plant in Sichuan province. By redesigning a compact heat exchange system to enhance heat transfer and improve catalystic reaction, he doubled the daily production of the plant. It was listed by the Chinese government as one of the country's 100 important achievements in 1966. In 1979, Wang founded the China Solar Power Society, and was its chairman until 1987.

Wang's research interests were heat transfer, including biomedical heat transfer and heat transfer through porous media, thermal properties of matter, and solar energy. From 1981 to 1987, he conducted basic research on the "film boiling of subcooled liquid flowing with higher velocity along a solid surface" and the "evaporation of liquid drops on solid surface", which won the State Natural Science Award in 1989. He published more than 400 research papers with more than 2000 SCI citations, and ten monographs or textbooks.

Wang was elected an academician of the Chinese Academy of Sciences in 1980. He was conferred the Research Scholarship Award of the Japan Society for the Promotion of Science in 1985, the Energy for Mankind Prize of the Global Energy Society in 1986, the Ho Leung Ho Lee Prize for Technological Sciences in 1998, and the Lifetime Achievement Award by the China Solar Thermal Alliance in 2018.

== Personal life and death ==
Wang's eldest son, Wang Ruji (王如骥), is a chemist who served as vice chair of the chemistry department of Tsinghua University.

Wang died on 31 August 2019 in Beijing, aged 97.
