= Deng Tietao =

Chinese physician (1916–2019)

Deng Tietao (Chinese: 邓铁涛; 6 November 1916 – 10 January 2019) was a Chinese physician, a professor and doctoral advisor at Guangzhou University of Chinese Medicine. He was named a "Master of National Medicine" of China in 2009.

== Biography ==
Deng was born in 1916 (on the 11th day of the 10th month of Chinese calendar), in Kaiping, Guangdong, China. His former name was Deng Xicai (邓锡才). From 1932, he studied at Guangdong Traditional Chinese Medicine and Pharmacology School (now Guangzhou University of Chinese Medicine). He began practicing medicine in 1938 and later became a professor at his alma mater. In 1962 and 1979, he was twice named by the Guangdong Provincial Government as a "famous TCM doctor of Guangdong".

He was awarded an honorary doctor degree by the Hong Kong Baptist University in 2001. In 2009, he was named a "Master of National Medicine" of China, received a Lifetime Achievement Award from the China Society for Chinese Medicine and Pharmacology, and won the Guangdong Science and Technology Award (First Class).

Starting in 1978, Deng trained 27 master's degree students, 15 doctoral students, and a postdoctoral researcher.

After a career spanning more than 80 years, Deng died on 10 January 2019 in Guangzhou, at the age of 102 (104 in East Asian age reckoning). In September 2019, he was posthumously conferred the National Outstanding Contribution in Chinese Medicine Award.
