= Feng Yuanwei =

Chinese politician and scholar (1930–2019)

Feng Yuanwei (Chinese: 冯元蔚; August 1930 – 15 July 2019) was a People's Republic of China politician and scholar. He was born in Xichang, the capital of Liangshan Yi Autonomous Prefecture in Sichuan province. An ethnic Yi, his Yi name was Bahu Mumou (Chinese: 巴胡母牟). He attended Southwest University for Nationalities. He was the 6th CPPCC Committee Chairman of his home province.

Preceded by Yang Chao	CPPCC Committee Chairman of Sichuan	Succeeded by Liao Bokang
