= Sun Zhongliang =

Chinese electrical engineer (1936–2019)

Sun Zhongliang (Chinese: 孙忠良; 26 August 1936 – 29 June 2019) was a Chinese electrical engineer and professor at Southeast University who specialized in extremely high frequency research. He was an academician of the Chinese Academy of Engineering and a recipient of the State Science and Technology Progress Award (First Class).

== Biography ==
Sun was born on 26 August 1936 in Shanghai, Republic of China. He tested into the Department of Radio Engineering of Nanjing Institute of Technology (now Southeast University) in 1955, and was hired by the university as a faculty member upon graduation in 1960. He became an associate professor in 1983 and full professor in 1987.

Sun was a renowned expert in the field of extremely high frequency (EHF). He solved a series of difficult problems in EHF, with important applications in military engineering and 5G mobile communication. For his contributions, he was awarded the State Science and Technology Progress Award (First Class) as well as six provincial and ministerial science prizes. Sun was elected an academician of the Chinese Academy of Engineering in 2001. He was a member of the 8th, 9th, and 10th Chinese People's Political Consultative Conference (CPPCC).

Sun died from an illness on 29 June 2019 in Nanjing, at the age of 82.
