= Xu Zhongyu =

Chinese writer and literary scholar (1915–2019)

Xu Zhongyu (Chinese: 徐中玉; February 5, 1915 – June 25, 2019) was a Chinese writer and literary scholar who served as Professor and Chair of the Department of Chinese of East China Normal University. His book University Chinese (大学语文) has been the standard textbook in Chinese universities for almost forty years, with 30 million copies printed as of 2019.

== Biography ==
Xu Zhongyu was born on February 5, 1915 in Jiangyin, Jiangsu, Republic of China. He graduated from the Department of Chinese of National Central University in 1939, and the graduate school of Sun Yat-sen University in 1941.

In 1952, Xu became a professor in the Department of Chinese of East China Normal University in Shanghai. After the Cultural Revolution, Xu was appointed Chair of the Department of Chinese. Together with Kuang Yaming, then president of Nanjing University, he advocated the restoration of the university Chinese course requirement, which had been abolished in 1952. He oversaw the compilation of the textbook University Chinese (大学语文), published in 1981. It has become the standard textbook in Chinese universities, and by the time of his death in 2019, 30 million copies of the book had been printed.

As the Chair of Chinese at East China Normal University, Xu encouraged students to engage in creative writing and publishing. He initiated the reform that allowed students of the Chinese Department to submit their literary works as an alternative to the required graduation thesis. This made the university a hotbed of Chinese literature. A number of Xu's students became well known writers, including Zhao Lihong, Sun Yong 孙颙, Nan Fan 南帆, Wang Xiaoying 王小鹰, Chen Danyan, Mao Shi'an 毛时安, and Chen Bohai 陈伯海. Zhao submitted his poetry collection as his graduation work, while Sun published Winter, one of the first major novels in the post-Cultural Revolution era, and Nan had his university homework published in one of the literary journals that Xu edited.

Xu's major works include Exploring the Heritage of Lu Xun (魯迅遺產探索) and A Treatise on the Creation of Ancient Literature and Art (古代文藝創作論). In December 2014, Xu received the Lifetime Achievement Award of the 6th Shanghai Literature and Arts Awards. When he was 100, he donated his savings of 1 million yuan to establish a scholarship at East China Normal University, as well as his collection of 50,000 books.

Xu died on 25 June 2019 at Huadong Hospital in Shanghai, at the age of 104.
