= Zhai Xiangjun =

Chinese translator and educator (1939–2019)

- Chinese: 翟象俊
Transcriptions
Standard Mandarin
- Hanyu Pinyin: Zhái Xiàngjùn
- Wade–Giles: Chai Hsiang-chün

Zhai Xiangjun (1939 – 8 July 2019) was a Chinese translator and educator, particularly known for his translation of Gone with the Wind and his university-level English textbooks. He was a professor and vice chair of foreign languages at Fudan University and served as vice president of Shanghai Translators' Association.

== Biography ==
Zhai was born in 1939. He studied Russian in high school and was interested in Russian literature. However, when he graduated in 1957, none of the Chinese universities accepted Russian majors in that year, and he ended up enrolling in the English program of Fudan University, despite having had virtually no exposure to that language.

Upon graduation in 1962, Zhai pursued postgraduate studies at Fudan from 1962 to 1966. He later served as professor in English and vice chair of foreign languages at the university. He translated many works from English into Chinese, including Gone with the Wind, The Moneychangers, O Crime do Padre Amaro, and The Autobiography of Mao Tse-tung as Told to Edgar Snow, as well as short stories by Ernest Hemingway, Nathaniel Hawthorne, and Samuel Beckett.

In 1979, when Zhai was temporarily unable to teach following dental surgery, he was assigned to write a university English textbook. From then on, textbook writing became a major part of his career. His 5-volume College English and 16-volume 21st-Century College English have been adopted by most Chinese universities as textbooks. In 1991, College English won the Special Prize of the National University Textbooks Award. He also assisted Lu Gusun with editing Great English-Chinese Dictionary (英汉大词典).

Zhai served as Vice President of Shanghai Translators' Association and was awarded a special pension for distinguished experts by the State Council of the People's Republic of China.

Zhai Xiangjun died on 8 July 2019 at the age of 80. He was survived by a son, Zhai Biao (翟飙).
