= Wang Jiafu =

Chinese legal scholar (1931–2019)

Wang Jiafu (Chinese: 王家福; February 1931 – 13 July 2019) was a Chinese legal scholar. He served as Director of the Institute of Law, Chinese Academy of Social Sciences (CASS), and was elected an academician of the CASS. A leading authority on civil law in China, he was a member of the Legal Committee of the 8th National People's Congress and a member of the Standing Committee of the 9th National People's Congress. He played a major role in designing China's new legal system after the Cultural Revolution, and was awarded the "Pioneer of Reform" medal in 2018.

== Early life and education ==
Wang was born in February 1931 in a mountainous village in Nanchong, Sichuan, Republic of China. He moved to Chongqing at age ten, where he completed his primary and secondary education.

In August 1953, Wang graduated from China University of Political Science and Law in Beijing. He pursued graduate studies in the Soviet Union, and became a legal researcher at the Institute of Law, Chinese Academy of Social Sciences (then part of the Chinese Academy of Sciences) after returning to China in 1959.

== Career ==
When the reform and opening era began after the end of the Cultural Revolution, Wang published articles on the People's Daily and the journal Legal Research in 1978 and 1979, advocating the establishment of a civil code. In 1987, he was appointed a member of the working group for revising China's contract law. In March 1998, he was appointed a member of the working group for drafting China's civil code. His efforts helped facilitate the adoption of the General Rules of the Civil Law of the People's Republic of China by the 12th National People's Congress on 15 March 2017.

Wang played a major role in designing China's new legal system. In 1995 and 1996, he was twice invited to Zhongnanhai to give legal lectures to the Politburo of the Chinese Communist Party, including China's top leaders, Party general secretary Jiang Zemin and Premier Li Peng. He emphasized the crucial need for legislation to prevent the politically powerful from profiting from the free market, especially during China's transition from a planned economy to a market economy. The merit of his proposal was officially acknowledged by Jiang Zemin in 1996.

Wang served as Director of the Institute of Law, Chinese Academy of Social Sciences (CASS), and was elected an academician of the CASS. He was a member of the Legal Committee of the 8th National People's Congress and a member of the Standing Committee of the 9th National People's Congress. In 2018, the 40th anniversary of China's reform and opening, the Chinese government awarded Wang the "Pioneer of Reform" medal.

Wang died on 13 July 2019 at the Peking Union Medical College Hospital in Beijing, at the age of 88.
