= Zha Quanxing =

Chinese electrochemist (1925–2019)

- 査全性
- Born: April 11, 1925; Nanjing, Jiangsu, China
- Died: August 1, 2019 (aged 94); China
- Education: Wuhan University; Moscow State University
- Scientific career
- Fields: Electrochemical energy science and technology
- Workplaces: Wuhan University

Zha Quanxing (Chinese: 査全性; pinyin: Zhā Quánxìng; April 11, 1925 – August 1, 2019) was a Chinese electrochemist who served as Professor and Chair of the Department of Chemistry of Wuhan University. He was elected an academician of the Chinese Academy of Sciences in 1980.

== Biography ==
Zha was born in Nanjing, Jiangsu, on April 11, 1925, the son of Zha Qian, a physicist and the first president of Huazhong University of Science and Technology. His ancestral home was in Jing County, Anhui. He joined the Chinese Communist Party in 1949. In 1950 he graduated from Wuhan University, where he majored in chemistry. From 1957 to 1959, he went to Moscow State University to study under electrochemist Alexander Frumkin. He returned to China in 1959 and that year became teacher at his alma mater. In August 1977, he was invited to attend a scientific and educational symposium held at the Great Hall of the People in Beijing, at which he first proposed that the college entrance examination should be resumed, with Deng Xiaoping's consent. He was promoted to Professor in 1978 and Chair of the Department of Chemistry of Wuhan University the following year. He was elected an academician of the Chinese Academy of Sciences in 1980. He died on August 1, 2019, at the age of 94.

== Awards ==
- 1987 Third Prize of the National Natural Science Award
