= Jin Guozhang =

Chinese pharmacologist and psychopathologist (1927–2019)

- 金国章
- Born: June 6, 1927; Yongkang, Zhejiang, China
- Died: January 29, 2019 (aged 91); Shanghai, China
- Education: Zhejiang University
- Scientific career
- Fields: Neuropharmacology
- Institutions: Shanghai Institute of Materia Medica, Chinese Academy of Sciences (SIMM, CAS)

Chinese name
- Traditional Chinese: 金國章
- Simplified Chinese: 金国章
Transcriptions
Standard Mandarin
- Hanyu Pinyin: Jīn Guózhāng

Jin Guozhang (simplified Chinese: 金国章; traditional Chinese: 金國章; 6 June 1927 – 29 January 2019) was a Chinese pharmacologist and psychopathologist. He is considered as a pioneer of modernizing traditional Chinese medicine.

== Biography ==
Jin was born on June 6 1927 in Yongkang, Zhejiang, China. He studied at the Department of Pharmacy, School of Sciences, Zhejiang University. He later became a researcher at the Shanghai Institute of Materia Medica, Chinese Academy of Sciences (SIMM, CAS). He also served as a professor at the School of Pharmacy, Fudan University in Shanghai. Jin was elected an academician of the CAS in 2001.

Jin systematically studied the Chinese traditional medicines, their ingredients and compositions. He also identified several important effective ingredients and their pharmacological approaches for some traditional medicines. Jin also holds several patents of Chinese medicines. He won the Ho Leung Ho Lee Prize in 2002.

Jin died on 29 January 2019 in Shanghai, at the age of 91.
