= Gu Linfang =

Chinese politician and police official (1928–2019)

Gu Linfang (Chinese: 顾林昉; September 1928 – 16 February 2019) was a Chinese police official and politician. He served as Secretary-General of the Central Political and Legal Affairs Commission, a minister-level position, and as Vice Minister of the Ministry of Public Security.

== Biography ==
Gu was born in September 1928 in Nantong, Jiangsu, Republic of China. He began participating in the Chinese Communist Revolution in May 1942, and joined the Chinese Communist Party in July 1947.

After the establishment of the People's Republic of China in 1949, Gu began working in the Ministry of Public Security in October 1950. He was persecuted during the Cultural Revolution and sent to perform hard labour in the countryside. He was later politically rehabilitated in November 1971 and served in the Public Security Bureau in Beijing, and later as Deputy Police Chief in Shanghai.

In 1972, Gu served as head of the team in the Ministry of Public Security that captured the Soviet spy Li Hongshu (李洪枢).

From December 1980, Gu served in the Central Political and Legal Affairs Commission, as Head of its General Office and later Deputy Secretary-General. In October 1986, he was promoted to Secretary-General of the commission, a minister-level position. In May 1988, he was appointed a minister-level Vice Minister of the Ministry of Public Security. He also served as a Standing Committee Member of the 8th National People's Congress.

Gu retired in December 1999. He died on 16 February 2019 in Beijing, at the age of 90.
