= Fang Huai =

Chinese general (1917–2019)

- 方槐
- Born: Lai Fanghuai; 24 October 1917; Yudu County, Jiangxi, China
- Died: 16 February 2019 (aged 101); Wuhan, Hubei, China
- Spouse: Wang Yunxue
- Military career
- Allegiance: Chinese Communist Party; People's Republic of China
- Branch: People's Liberation Army Air Force
- Service years: 1932–1983
- Rank: Major general
- Units: Red Army; People's Liberation Army
- Conflicts: Second Sino-Japanese War
- Awards: Second Class Medal, Order of Bayi; Second Class Medal, Order of Independence and Freedom; Second Class Medal, Order of Liberation; First Class Medal, Order of Red Star

Fang Huai (Chinese: 方槐; pinyin: Fāng Huái; 24 October 1917 – 16 February 2019) was a major general of the Chinese People's Liberation Army.

== Biography ==
Fang was born Lai Fanghuai (Chinese: 赖方槐) into a family of farming background in Yudu County, Jiangxi in October 1917. At the age of 12, he joined the Communist Children's League and two years later he joined the Communist Youth League of China. He enlisted in the Chinese Red Army in February 1932 and joined the Chinese Communist Party in the next year.

During the Second Sino-Japanese War, with the help of the Soviet Union, he trained pilots in Xinjiang. In 1942, Chiang Kai-shek ordered his subordinates to detain Fang and other Communists. After Zhang Zhizhong's rescue, he returned to Yan'an in 1946. Then he was sent to Shenyang to establish an aviation school.

On October 1, 1949, he flew an airplane over Tiananmen to be inspected by the Party and the people. After the founding of the Communist State, Fang Huai was appointed director of Aircraft and Navigation Department of the Civil Aviation Administration of the Central Military Commission, director of Operations Department of the Air Defense Force Command, director of Navigation and Telecommunications Department of the Civil Aviation Administration of the Central Military Commission, manager of the People's Airlines of China, president of the PLA Third Air Force School, and deputy commander of the Wuhan Military Region Air Force.

On December 30, 1951, Mao Zedong commissioned him as president of the Civil Aviation University of China. He was awarded the military rank of major general (shao jiang) by Mao Zedong in 1955. He retired in 1983.

Fang Huai died on February 16, 2019, in Wuhan, Hubei, aged 101.

== Awards ==
- Second Class Medal, Order of Bayi
- Second Class Medal, Order of Independence and Freedom
- Second Class Medal, Order of Liberation
- First Class Medal, Order of Red Star

== Personal life ==
Fang married Wang Yunxue (Chinese: 王韵雪), who was the widow of Chen Tanqiu, they had two sons and two daughters and three step children.
