= Zhang Zong =

Chinese crystallographer (1929–2019)

- 章综
- Born: May 16, 1929; Yixing, Jiangsu, China
- Died: August 27, 2019 (aged 90); Beijing, China
- Education: National Central University
- Scientific career
- Fields: Crystallography
- Workplaces: Chinese Academy of Sciences (CAS)

Chinese name
- Traditional Chinese: 章綜
- Simplified Chinese: 章综
Transcriptions
Standard Mandarin
- Hanyu Pinyin: Zhāng Zōng

Zhang Zong (Chinese: 章综; 16 May 1929 – 27 August 2019) was a Chinese crystallographer and an academician of the Chinese Academy of Sciences (CAS).

== Biography ==
Zhang was born in Yixing, Jiangsu, on May 16, 1929. After graduating from Nankai High School in Chongqing in July 1948, he was admitted to National Central University. After graduation, he was assigned to the Institute of Physics, Chinese Academy of Sciences (CAS). He joined the Chinese Communist Party the same year. In 1959 he went to the Semiconductor Institute of the Soviet Academy of Sciences to further his studies. He returned to China 1962.

In 1978, Zhang was appointed deputy director of the CAS Institute of Physics. In November 1980 he was elected an academician of the Chinese Academy of Sciences (CAS). In 1982, he was appointed deputy director of the Division of Mathematics and Physics of the CAS, and was promoted to Director two years later.

Zhang died on August 27, 2019, in Beijing, aged 90.
