= Mao Dehua =

Chinese geographer and politician (1935–2019)

Mao Dehua (Chinese: 毛德华; November 1935 – 26 January 2019) was a Chinese geographer and politician. He served as Director of the Xinjiang branch of the Chinese Academy of Sciences, Vice Chairman of Xinjiang Autonomous Region, and Vice Chairman of the Xinjiang Chinese People's Political Consultative Conference (CPPCC).

== Biography ==
Mao was born in November 1935 in Taicang, Jiangsu, Republic of China. He entered Nanjing University in September 1953 and graduated in 1957 with a degree in natural geography. In May 1958 he began working for the Xinjiang branch of the Chinese Academy of Sciences (CAS), and participated in field surveys in Xinjiang for earthquake and resource investigation. In June 1979 he became Deputy Director of the Institute of Geographic Research of the CAS Xinjiang branch, and was later promoted to director. In July 1984, he was appointed Director of the CAS Xinjiang branch.

In December 1985, Mao was appointed Vice Chairman of Xinjiang Autonomous Region. In January 1993, he became Vice Chairman of the Xinjiang Chinese People's Political Consultative Conference (CPPCC). He served two terms until his retirement in June 2004.

Mao died in Ürümqi on 26 January 2019, at the age of 83.
