= Hu Peizhao =

Chinese economist and professor (1937–2019)

Hu Peizhao (Chinese: 胡培兆; 1937 – 26 April 2019) was a Chinese economist and a professor at Xiamen University. He served as Director of the Institute of Economic Research and Dean of the College of Economics at the university, and as an economic advisor to the national government of China. In 1985, he was among the first economists to win the Sun Yefang Prize, China's highest honour in economics.

== Education and career ==
Hu was born in 1937 in Yongkang, Zhejiang, Republic of China. In 1956, he entered Xiamen University, where he studied economics under Wang Yanan (王亚南), one of China's most prominent economists and president of the university.

After graduating with top grades in 1960, Hu was exempted from the entrance examination and accepted by the graduate school of Fudan University. However, Fudan soon reduced the size of its graduate school and Hu became a teaching assistant without finishing his studies. He was later assigned to teach at a high school in Jinhua near his hometown.

Frustrated with his situation, Hu wrote Wang Yanan to request a transfer back to Xiamen University. However, the Cultural Revolution (1966–1976) intervened and China fell into a decade of chaos. After the end of the turbulent period, Hu was finally transferred to Xiamen University as a faculty member in 1977. He soon published his first book, Marx and Das Kapital, which was mostly written when he was teaching high school.

In 1979, Hu advocated the theory that "a socialist economy is a planned commodity economy based on public ownership of the means of production". It was at the time a bold view that strayed from the Marxist orthodoxy and played a historic role before the Chinese government officially adopted the market economy. When China established the Sun Yefang Prize in 1985, the country's highest honour in economics, Hu was among the first to receive the prize. He was subsequently promoted to full professor.

During the reform and opening era, when the Chinese government began to encourage foreign investment and private enterprises, many complained that it was the return of capitalism and exploitation. Starting in 1988, Hu authored a series of articles, including "A Brief Discussion on Exploitation" and "Another Discussion on Exploitation", to defend the reform policies. He argued that investors receiving economic returns from their capital investment was reasonable allocation of production gains and could not be considered exploitation. His articles attracted sharp criticism from Marxists, who accused him of justifying capitalist exploitation of labour. He engaged in multiple debates with his opponents, and his view eventually prevailed and was widely accepted.

Hu served as Director of the Institute of Economic Research and Dean of the College of Economics of Xiamen University. In 1997, he was appointed an economic advisor to the State Council, together with Li Yining and others.

Hu wrote more than ten books and over 400 articles, many of which were published on influential national newspapers such as People's Daily, Guangming Daily, and Qiushi. He supervised more than 30 doctoral students, including Professor Weng Junyi (翁君奕) of Xiamen University, who would also become a Sun Yefang Prize laureate.

== Personal life ==
Hu met his wife Huang Fuxian (黄福仙), a fellow teacher, while he was a high school teacher in Jinhua. They had a daughter, Hu Xiaolei (胡晓蕾), and a son, Hu Qiwei (胡骑巍).

Hu was diagnosed with prostate cancer in 2017. He died on 26 April 2019, at the age of 82.
