= Tang Dingyuan =

Chinese physicist and writer (1920–2019)

- Born: 12 May 1920; Jintan, Jiangsu, Republic of China
- Died: 3 June 2019 (aged 99); Shanghai, China

Chinese name
- Traditional Chinese: 湯定元
- Simplified Chinese: 汤定元
Transcriptions
Standard Mandarin
- Hanyu Pinyin: Tāng Dìngyuán
- Wade–Giles: T'ang^{1} Ting^{4}-yüan^{2}
- IPA: [tʰáŋ tîŋɥɛ̌n]

Tang Dingyuan (Chinese: 汤定元; 12 May 1920 – 3 June 2019), also known as Ting-Yuan Tang, was a Chinese physicist and writer. He was considered a founder of semiconductor and infrared research in China. He served as Director of the Shanghai Institute of Technical Physics and was elected an academician of the Chinese Academy of Sciences in 1991.

== Early life ==
Tang was born on 12 May 1920 in Jintan, Jiangsu, Republic of China. After finishing middle school in Jintan, he entered Wuxi Normal College in 1935. Two years later, however, the Second Sino-Japanese War broke out and the Japanese army occupied Jiangsu. Tang and his classmates fled Wuxi and begged their way to Wuhan in central China, where they lived in a refugee camp. In 1938, the Kuomintang government arranged for the student refugees to enroll at National Sichuan High School in Chongqing, China's wartime capital. He subsequently entered National Central University, then also exiled in Chongqing, and graduated from the Department of Physics in 1942.

== Career in the United States ==
In 1946, after the end of World War II, Tang took the government scholarship examination for studying in the United States, but failed due to his poor English skills. In 1948, he managed to take a loan from National Central University and went to the US on his own expense.

After briefly attending the University of Minnesota, he transferred to the University of Chicago, where he earned his master's degree in physics in 1950 under the supervision of Andrew W. Lawson. At Chicago, he discovered a new phase transition of the metal cerium under high pressure and determined that it occurred from the sudden contraction of the atomic radius. With Lawson, he also invented the split diamond bomb, a device for taking x-rays under high pressure, which became widely used in high-pressure physics.

== Career in China ==
After the outbreak of the Korean War, Tang gave up his doctoral studies and returned to China in 1951, where he joined the Institute of Applied Physics of the Chinese Academy of Sciences. He and Wang Shouwu, also a recent returnee from the US, together built a semiconductor research group at the institute. After being briefly disrupted by the Three-anti and Five-anti Campaigns in 1952, they planned to conduct research on the semiconductors germanium and silicon. Due to the Western world's embargo against China since the Korean War, however, they were unable to acquire sufficient high-purity material, and decided to work on galena (PbS) and copper(I) oxide (Cu_{2}O) instead. Tang stumbled upon the property of PbS as an infrared detector, and realized the importance of this property from the visiting Soviet scientist Ivan Bardin. Tang's group was the first to conduct infrared research in China.

In 1958, Tang led an infrared detector group with scientists from nine research institutions. In 1964, he became Director of the Shanghai Institute of Technical Physics and turned it into one of China's top infrared research centers. He developed about ten infrared or semiconductor devices including the silicon solar cell and the mercury cadmium telluride detector, which were used in satellites, missiles, and civilian instruments. His research led to the development of infrared detectors for the PL-2 air-to-air missiles and is considered a major contribution to the Two Bombs, One Satellite project. As his work was highly classified, Tang disappeared from public view for many years.

Tang was elected an academician of the Chinese Academy of Sciences in 1991. He was awarded the Ho Leung Ho Lee Prize for Science and Technology Progress, and donated the entire prize money of HK$200,000 to his alma mater, Hua Luogeng High School in Jintan.

Tang published ten popular science books. In his old age, he frequently gave lectures to schoolchildren, and served as a scientific advisor to a children's science newspaper in Shanghai.

== Health and death ==
When he was 85, Tang underwent a gallbladder surgery. He died on 3 June 2019 at Huadong Hospital in Shanghai, at the age of 99.
