= Li Fulin =

Chinese police official and politician (1960–2019)

Li Fulin

Li Fulin (Chinese: 李富林; January 1960 – 23 March 2019) was a Chinese police official and politician. He served as Director of Public Security and Vice Governor of Hainan Province and Vice Chairman of the Chinese People's Political Consultative Conference of Hainan.

== Biography ==
Li was born in January 1960 in Lingqiu County, Shanxi, China. He entered the work force in August 1980 and joined the Chinese Communist Party in May 1984. He spent most of his career in police departments in Shanxi, serving as deputy police chief of Shuozhou, police chief and vice mayor of Jincheng, and deputy police chief of Shanxi province.

In June 2012, Li was transferred to Hainan in South China to serve as Director of Public Security (police chief) of the province. In May 2015, he was promoted to Vice Governor of Hainan, while concurrently serving as police chief. In February 2017, he was appointed Vice Chairman of the Chinese People's Political Consultative Conference (CPPCC) of Hainan, but served for less than a year, until January 2018.

Li died in Beijing of an undisclosed illness on 23 March 2019, at the age of 59. His funeral was held on 31 March at the Babaoshan Revolutionary Cemetery. It was attended by more than 200 people, including Shen Xiaoming, Mao Wanchun and other provincial leaders of Hainan.
