= Yu Dunkang =

Chinese philosopher and historian (1930–2019)

Yu Dunkang (Chinese: 余敦康; May 1930 – 14 July 2019) was a Chinese philosopher and historian of Chinese philosophy, known for his research on Xuanxue and the I Ching. Denounced as a "rightist" during the Anti-Rightist Campaign in 1957, he was banished from academia for twenty years. After the end of the Cultural Revolution, he became a research professor at the Institute of World Religions of the Chinese Academy of Social Sciences (CASS), and was elected an honorary academician of the CASS.

== Early life and education ==
Yu was born in May 1930 in Hanyang, Hubei, Republic of China. In 1951, he entered the Department of Philosophy of Wuhan University. During the People's Republic of China's nationwide reorganization of higher education in 1952, his department was merged into the philosophy department of Peking University, from which he graduated in 1955. After teaching at a high school in Tianjin for a year, Yu returned to Peking University to pursue graduate studies in philosophy.

== Banishment ==
During the Hundred Flowers Campaign of 1957, Yu wrote four letters that advocated rationalism, democracy and freedom, and socialist rule of law. As a result, he was denounced as a "rightist" during the ensuing Anti-Rightist Campaign and sent to Beijing's countryside to perform manual labour. After his rehabilitation in 1969, he was assigned to teach middle school in Zaoyang, Hubei for the next eight years.

During his two-decade-long banishment from academia, Yu focused on self-study of Xuanxue, the philosophy of China's Six Dynasties period (third to sixth centuries), an era of division and turmoil. In his autobiography, he reminisced that he found solace in the ancient philosophers' reflections on fate, and their pursuit of freedom of thought and self-awareness in the face of adversity.

== Academic career ==
After the end of the Cultural Revolution, Yu returned to academia in 1978 and became a researcher at the Institute of World Religions of the Chinese Academy of Social Sciences. In the 1980s, he carried out comprehensive studies on Xuanxue, and published a series of papers on such concepts as youwu (being and non-being) and benmo (root and branches), as well as the ideas of philosophers Wang Bi, He Yan, Ruan Ji and Ji Kang. His Xuanxue research culminated in the book History of Wei–Jin Xuanxue (魏晋玄学史), published by Peking University Press in 2004, which was followed by a second edition in 2016.

At the Institute of World Religions, Yu's research interest gradually shifted to the I Ching and the history of its studies. He wrote papers on the I Ching studies of the Zhou, Han, Wei, and Jin dynasties, before publishing Modern Interpretation of I Ching Studies of the Northern Song in 1997.

Yu held the view that Chinese civilization originated from ancient Chinese religions and is "genetically" different from Western civilization from the very beginning. A major focus of Chinese culture is family and clan relations. In the 20th century, many scholars judged Chinese culture from the Western perspective and criticized this as a negative characteristic, but Yu sought to focus on its positive aspects and considered it the source of Chinese culture's vitality.

In 1992, Yu was awarded a special pension for distinguished scholars by the State Council of China. He was elected an honorary academician of the Chinese Academy of Social Sciences. From 1993 to 2002, he was a member of the 8th and 9th Chinese People's Political Consultative Conference.

On 14 July 2019, Yu died at his home in Beijing, aged 89.

== Selected works ==
- History of the Development of Chinese Philosophy 中国哲学发展史 (co-author), People's Publishing House (1988)
- New Exploration on the Xuanxue of He Yan and Wang Bi 何晏王弼玄学新探, Qilu Shushe (1991)
- Modern Interpretation of I Ching Studies of the Northern Song 内圣外王的贯通—北宋易学的现代诠释, Xuelin Publishing House (1997)
- I Ching Studies and Management 易学与管理 (ed.), Shenyang Publishing House (1997)
- Collection of Papers on Chinese Philosophy 中国哲学论集, Liaoning University Press (1998)
- History of Wei–Jin Xuanxue 魏晋玄学史, Peking University Press (2004, Second Edition 2016)
- Religion, Philosophy, Ethics 宗教·哲学·伦理, Science Press (2005)
- The Past and Today in I Ching Studies 易学今昔, Guangxi Normal University Press (2005)
- Interpretation of I Ching Studies of the Han and Song Dynasties 汉宋易学解读, Huaxia Publishing House (2006)
- A Modern Interpretation of the Zhou Yi 周易现代解读, Huaxia Publishing House (2006)
