= Tu Mingjing =

Chinese materials scientist (1928–2019)

- 涂铭旌
- Born: 15 November 1928; Ba County, Sichuan, China
- Died: 1 January 2019 (aged 90); Chengdu, Sichuan, China
- Education: Tongji University; Harbin Institute of Technology; University of Science and Technology Beijing
- Scientific career
- Fields: Materials science
- Workplaces: Sichuan University

Chinese name
- Traditional Chinese: 塗銘旌
- Simplified Chinese: 涂铭旌
Transcriptions
Standard Mandarin
- Hanyu Pinyin: Tú Míngjīng

Tu Mingjing (Chinese: 涂铭旌; 15 November 1928 – 1 January 2019) was a Chinese materials scientist and an academician of the Chinese Academy of Engineering.

== Biography ==
Tu was born in Ba County, Sichuan (now in Chongqing), on 15 November 1928. He secondary studied at the Affiliated Secondary School of Tongji University. In 1947 he was accepted to Tongji University, where he graduated in 1951. Then he successively studied at the Harbin Institute of Technology and University of Science and Technology Beijing, earning a master's degree.

After university, he became a lecturer at Tongji University, Shanghai Jiao Tong University and Xi'an Jiao Tong University. In 1983 he was a visiting scholar at the Karlsruhe Institute of Technology in Karlsruhe, Baden-Württemberg, Germany. In August 1988 he was transferred to the University of Science and Technology of Chengdu, where he served as dean of its Research Institute of High Technology. In 1994 he became a professor at the Sichuan University. He was elected an academician of the Chinese Academy of Engineering in 1995. In November 2008 he was hired as professor of the Chongqing University of Arts and Sciences.

On 1 January 2019, he died of illness in Chengdu, Sichuan.

== Awards ==
- State Natural Science Award
- State Science and Technology Progress Award (Second Class)
