= Mingyu (Chinese name) =

Mingyu may refer to:

- Lin Mingyu (1937–2019), Chinese politician
- Ma Mingyu (born 1970), Chinese International footballer
- Megan Mingyu Williams (1959–2000), Australian actress
- Zhang Mingyu (born 2001), female Chinese modern pentathlete
- Zhao Mingyu (born 1997), Chinese footballer
