= Ruan Xueyu =

Chinese pressure processing specialist and academician (1933–2019)

- 阮雪榆
- Born: 6 January 1933; Shanghai, China
- Died: 3 February 2019 (aged 86); Shanghai, China
- Education: Shanghai Jiao Tong University; Tsinghua University
- Scientific career
- Fields: Material Processing Engineering
- Workplaces: Chinese Academy of Engineering; Shanghai Jiao Tong University; North University of China

Ruan Xueyu (Chinese: 阮雪榆; pinyin: Ruǎn Xuěyú; 6 January 1933 – 3 February 2019) was a Chinese pressure processing specialist and academician of the Chinese Academy of Engineering (CAE). He was hailed as the "Father of Cold Extrusion Technology" in China. He was a professor at Shanghai Jiao Tong University, a part-time professor at Tsinghua University, and honorary professor at Kumamoto University.

He was the head of Shanghai Mould Technology Research Institute, director of Ford Motor Company-SJTU C3P Research Center, advanced counselor of Swiss FEINTOOL company, director on the Korean journal International Journal of Automotive Technology and the German journal Research in Engineering Design, standing member of ICEM. He was a member of the 10th Central Committee of Jiusan Society, one of the eight legally recognised political parties in China.

== Biography ==
Ruan was born in Shanghai, on 6 January 1933, with his ancestral home in Zhongshan, Guangdong. His paternal grandfather was an overseas Chinese in Australia. His maternal grandfather was an overseas Chinese in Thailand. His father was a businessman in Shanghai and his mother was a famous doctor. He attended the Huanguang School. He elementary studied at the Second Middle School Affiliated to Datong University and secondary studied at the Nanyang Model High School. In 1950 he was accepted to Shanghai Jiao Tong University, where he majored in the Mechanical Department. After graduation, he pursued advanced studies in Tsinghua University.

He taught at Shanghai Jiao Tong University since 1953. His first academic work, Cold Extrusion Technology, was published by Shanghai Science and Technology Publishing House in 1963, which became textbook of Beijing Institute of Technology. In 1983, with the support of Shanghai Jiao Tong University, the leaders of Shanghai Municipal Government, he established the Shanghai Institute of Mold Technology and served as its director. That same year, he joined the Jiusan Society, one of the eight legally recognised political parties in China. In 1994 he was elected a fellow of the Chinese Academy of Engineering (CAE). In 1994, the Department of Plastic Forming Engineering was established in Shanghai Jiao Tong University, Ruan served as its dean. In 1996, with the approval of the State Planning Commission, the National Die and Mould CAD Engineering Research Center was established on the basis of the Shanghai Die and Mould Technology Research Institute, Ruan Xueyu became its director.

On 3 February 2019, he died of illness at Huadong Hospital, in Shanghai, aged 86.
