= Yang Chengzong =

- 杨承宗
- Born: 1911; Wujiang District, Suzhou, China
- Died: 2011 (aged 99–100)
- Education: Utopia University, Paris-Sud University
- Known for: Founding father of Radiochemistry in China; establishing first radiochemistry lab in China; contributions to nuclear fuel production
- Scientific career
- Fields: Radiochemistry, Nuclear Chemistry
- Workplaces: University of Science and Technology of China, China Institute of Atomic Energy

Yang Chengzong (Chinese: 杨承宗, 1911–2011) was a radiochemist, academician, and professor at the University of Science and Technology of China. He is regarded as the founding father of Radiochemistry in China.

He contributed to the establishment of the university in 1958 and founded the university's Department of Radiochemistry and Radiation Chemistry.

He established the first radiochemistry laboratory in China. In November 1978, Yang was appointed as the Vice President of the University of Science and Technology of China, and he retired from the university in March 1994.China. He is a member of the Chinese Chemical Society and the Chinese Nuclear Society. He served as the chair of the Professional Committee of Nuclear and Radiochemistry of the organizations.

== Education and career ==
Yang was born in Wujiang District, Suzhou in 1911. He obtained a degree from Utopia University. He began his career in radiochemistry in 1934, studying under Zheng Dazhang at the Radium Research Institute in Beijing. He attended the Curie Institute in Paris in 1947. He obtained a doctorate degree in 1951 from the College of Science, Paris-Sud University. His first engagement with radiochemistry research was at the China Institute of Atomic Energy.

Yang contributed to the field of nuclear fuel production, which impacted nuclear weapons tests and the development of China's nuclear energy.
