= Su Huiyu =

Chinese legal scholar (1934–2019)

- Traditional Chinese: 蘇惠漁
- Simplified Chinese: 苏惠渔
Transcriptions
Standard Mandarin
- Hanyu Pinyin: Sū Huìyú
- IPA: [sú xwêɪ.y̌]

Su Huiyu (Chinese: 苏惠渔; 17 September 1934 – 19 June 2019) was a Chinese legal scholar and a distinguished professor at the East China University of Political Science and Law. A specialist in criminal law, he was named a "National Distinguished Legal Scholar", the highest honour of the China Law Society.

== Biography ==
Su was born on 17 September 1934 in Suzhou, Jiangsu, Republic of China. After graduating from the Department of Law of Peking University in 1959, he was hired as a faculty member by the university. From 1963, he worked as a legal researcher at the Jiangsu Superior People's Court. In April 1965, he became a faculty member of the East China University of Political Science and Law (ECUPL) in Shanghai.

In April 1972, Su was transferred to Fudan University. In June 1979, he returned to ECUPL where he served as Director of Criminal Law. He was promoted to associate professor in 1982 and full professor in 1986. In 1993, he was awarded a special pension for the country's top scholars by the State Council of the People's Republic of China. He was named a distinguished professor in 2004, shortly before his retirement in December that year.

Su published dozens of books and more than 100 research papers. In 1994, he served as chief editor of Criminal Law (刑法学). It has been used as the standard textbook on the subject in Chinese universities, and won the National Excellent Textbook award. In 1996, he participated in the revision of China's criminal code.

In May 2019, Su was named a "National Distinguished Legal Scholar", the highest honour of the China Law Society. He was in poor health at the time, and the award was presented to him at Ruijin Hospital where he was hospitalized. He died less than a month later, on 19 June 2019, at the age of 84.

== Defence of Li Zuopeng ==
After the end of the Cultural Revolution, Su participated in the historic trial of the Gang of Four and the Lin Biao clique from November 1980 to January 1981. He and Zhang Sizhi served as a defence attorneys for General Li Zuopeng, a key associate of Lin Biao. During the trial, Su and Zhang did not deny the charge that Li was "one of the principal culprits of the Lin Biao counter-revolutionary clique", and Li admitted that he framed marshals Ye Jianying and He Long, and general Luo Ruiqing, who were all persecuted during the Cultural Revolution. However, Su and Zhang argued that Li was merely following Lin Biao's orders and that he later took the initiative to reveal his own crimes. In the end, Li was sentenced to 17 years in prison.

== View on capital punishment ==
Su regarded capital punishment as "irrational" and supported the eventual abolition of capital punishment in China; however, he argued that the goal should be achieved "step by step" over a long period of time, solely because the general public widely believed in "the retributive and deterrent effect of the death penalty".
