= Wang Qidong =

Chinese materials scientist (1921–2019)

- 王启东
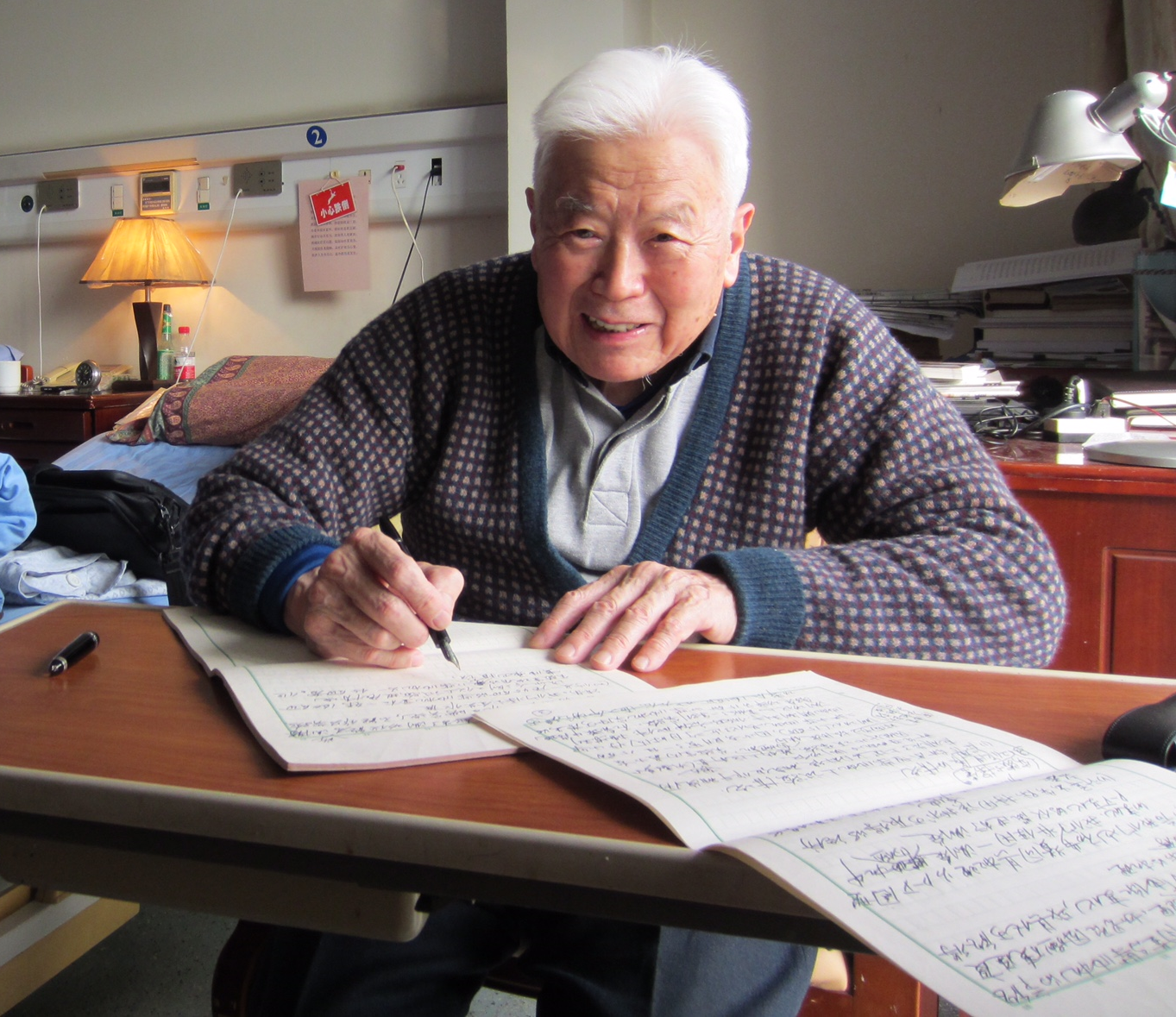
- Born: 27 September 1921; Huangyan, Zhejiang, Republic of China
- Died: 29 July 2019 (aged 97); Hangzhou, Zhejiang, People's Republic of China
- Occupations: Materials scientist, educator, politician
- Spouse: Zhang Sucheng (m. 1946; died 2013)
- Parent: Wang Jin

Wang Qidong (Chinese: 王启东; 27 September 1921 – 29 July 2019) was a Chinese materials scientist, educator, and politician. A pioneer in the field of materials science and engineering in China, his research was focused on high-speed steel and hydrogen storage materials. He served as Vice President of Zhejiang University and Vice Chairman of the Zhejiang People's Congress.

== Early life and education ==
Wang was born on 27 September 1921 in Huangyan, Zhejiang, Republic of China. His father, Wang Jin (王琎; 1888–1966), was a renowned chemist who served as chemistry chair and acting president of Zhejiang University. Wang attended Shanghai High School and experienced Japanese invasion of Shanghai in 1937, during which he suffered a life-threatening disease.

After graduating from the Department of Mechanical Engineering of Zhejiang University in 1943, he was hired by the university as a faculty member. In 1947, he was awarded a government scholarship to study in the United States. He earned his master's degree from Stanford University in 1948, and his Ph.D. from the University of Iowa in 1951, both in mechanical engineering.

== Career ==
After returning to China in 1951, Wang spent his entire career teaching at Zhejiang University. In the 1950s and 1960s, he served as Chair of the Department of Metallurgy and Vice Chair of the Department of Mechanical Engineering. In 1978, Zhejiang University established China's first Department of Materials Science and Engineering, and Wang was appointed its first chair. He concurrently served as Vice President of Zhejiang University from 1978 to 1984. He retired in 2010.

Wang was a pioneer in the field of materials science and engineering in China, with research focuses on high-speed steel and hydrogen storage materials. He published almost 400 research papers, of which 280 are included in the Science Citation Index. He held 18 patents and won multiple national and provincial prizes.

Wang joined the China Democratic League (Minmeng) in 1953. He was a member of the Fifth, Sixth, and Seventh Central Committee of Minmeng, and served as Chairman of Minmeng's Zhejiang Provincial Committee. He also served as Vice Chairman of the Fifth to Eighth Zhejiang Provincial People's Congress. He was a member of the Standing Committee of the 8th National People's Congress, and a delegate to the 9th National People's Congress.

== Personal life ==
In 1946, Wang married Zhang Sucheng (Chinese: 张苏澄).

Wang died in Hangzhou on 29 July 2019, at the age of 97.
