= Li Lun (general) =

Chinese lieutenant general (1927–2019)

- 李伦

President of the People's Liberation Army Logistics College
- In office 1986 – June 1989
- Preceded by: Xu Fangchun
- Succeeded by: Yang Faxun

Personal details
- Born: 30 October 1927 Chao County, Anhui, China
- Died: 25 June 2019 (aged 91) Beijing, China
- Party: Chinese Communist Party
- Education: Beijing Institute of Technology; Counter-Japanese Military and Political University

Military service
- Allegiance: People's Republic of China
- Branch/service: People's Liberation Army Ground Force
- Years of service: 1939–1988
- Rank: Lieutenant general

Chinese name
- Simplified Chinese: 李伦
- Traditional Chinese: 李倫
Transcriptions
Standard Mandarin
- Hanyu Pinyin: Lǐ Lún

Li Runxiu
- Simplified Chinese: 李润修
- Traditional Chinese: 李潤修
Transcriptions
Standard Mandarin
- Hanyu Pinyin: Lǐ Rùnxiū

Li Lun (Chinese: 李伦; 30 October 1927 – 25 June 2019) was a lieutenant general of the Chinese People's Liberation Army (PLA) who served as President of the PLA Logistics Academy and deputy director of the PLA General Logistics Department. He was the son of General Li Kenong.

== Biography ==
Li Lun was born as Li Runxiu (李润修) on 30 October 1927 in Wuhu, Anhui, Republic of China. He was the youngest son of Li Kenong, a Communist Party intelligence officer and general, and his wife Zhao Ying (赵瑛).

In 1939, Li Lun enlisted in the Eighth Route Army at the age of 12 and served as a messenger. In March 1941, his parents brought him to Yan'an, the Communist headquarters during the Second Sino-Japanese War, where he studied at the Yan'an Artillery School.

During the Chinese Civil War, Li began to engage in combat and fought in many battles including the Battle of Jinan, the Huaihai Campaign and the Yangtze River Crossing Campaign. He was promoted to Commander of the First Battalion of the Artillery Regiment of the East China Field Army. In 1949, he was awarded the First Class Merit for his performance in the Battle of the Zhoushan Archipelago.

After the founding of the People's Republic of China, Li worked in multiple positions in logistics. He was appointed President of the PLA Logistics Academy in 1986 and later promoted to deputy director of the PLA General Logistics Department. He attained the rank of lieutenant general in 1988.

Li died on 25 June 2019 in Beijing, at the age of 91.

Military offices
| Preceded by Xu Fangchun | President of the People's Liberation Army Logistics College; 1986–1989 | Succeeded by Yang Faxun |
