= Zhan Wenshan =

Chinese electrical engineer and physicist (1941–2019)

Zhan Wenshan (Chinese: 詹文山; February 1941 – 9 May 2019) was a Chinese electrical engineer and physicist who specialized in the research of magnetism. He was the founding director of the Technical Institute of Physics and Chemistry (TIPC) of the Chinese Academy of Sciences. He also served as professor and vice director of the Institute of Physics, Chinese Academy of Sciences.

== Biography ==
Zhan was born in February 1941. After graduating from the Department of Physics of the University of Science and Technology of China in 1963, he began working for the Institute of Physics, Chinese Academy of Sciences. He later served as Director of the National Key Laboratory for Magnetism and Vice Director of the Institute of Physics.

When the Technical Institute of Physics and Chemistry (TIPC) of the Chinese Academy of Sciences was established in June 1999, Zhan was appointed its first director.

Zhan published more than 100 research papers and supervised dozens of master's and doctoral students, as well as postdoctoral researchers. He also held 16 patents in China and the United States. His research won the 1978 National Science Congress Award and the 1980 Chinese Academy of Sciences First Prize.

Zhan died of an illness on 9 May 2019 in Beijing, at the age of 78.
