= Sun Wei (engineer) =

Chinese civil engineer (1935–2019)

- 孙伟
- Born: 20 November 1935; Jiaozhou, Shandong, China
- Died: 22 February 2019 (aged 83); Nanjing, Jiangsu, China
- Education: Southeast University
- Scientific career
- Fields: Civil engineering and materials science
- Workplaces: Southeast University

Chinese name
- Traditional Chinese: 孫偉
- Simplified Chinese: 孙伟
Transcriptions
Standard Mandarin
- Hanyu Pinyin: Sūn Wěi

Sun Wei (Chinese: 孙伟; 20 November 1935 – 22 February 2019) was a Chinese civil engineer and an academician of the Chinese Academy of Engineering (CAE).

== Biography ==
Sun was born in Jiaozhou, Shandong, on 20 November 1935. She graduated from the Nanjing Institute of Technology (now Southeast University) in July 1958 and became a faculty member. She joined the Chinese Communist Party in 1956. She was promoted to associate professor in 1986 and to full professor in 1991.

She published over 400 scientific papers and five monographs. In 2005, she was elected an academician of the Chinese Academy of Engineering (CAE).

She died of an illness in Nanjing, Jiangsu, on 22 February 2019.
