= Dong Jian =

Chinese literary scholar (1936–2019)

Dong Jian (Chinese: 董健. January 1936 – 12 May 2019) was a Chinese literary scholar who specialized in the history of the theatre of China. He was a distinguished professor and Chair of the Department of Chinese at Nanjing University, and served as Vice President of the university from 1988 to 1993.

== Biography ==
Dong was born in January 1936 in Shouguang, Shandong, Republic of China. He entered Beijing Russian College (now part of Beijing Foreign Studies University) in 1956, before transferring to Nanjing University the following year to study Chinese literature. Upon graduation in 1962, he pursued his master's degree at Nanjing University under the supervision of Chen Zhongfan (陈中凡), and expert in classical Chinese theatre.

After completing his studies, Dong became a faculty member of Nanjing University. He served as Chair of the Chinese Department from 1986 to 1988, Vice President of Nanjing University from 1988 to 1993, President of the Institute of Theatre, Film, and Television Research from 1993 to 2012, and Director of the China New Literature Research Centre from 2005 to 2011.

Dong published numerous works on theatre history and theory, as well as contemporary literature of China. One of his most important works is A Draft History of Modern Chinese Theatre (中国现代戏剧史稿), co-authored with the renowned playwright Chen Baichen. It won multiple national and provincial prizes. He also published a comprehensive study of Chen Baichen's works, Biography of Tian Han, and A New Draft History of Contemporary Chinese Literature (中国当代文学史新稿). People's Literature Publishing House published his collective works in 2016.

Dong died on 12 May 2019 in Nanjing, at the age of 83.
