= Lin Mingyu =

Chinese politician (1937–2019)

Lin Mingyu (Chinese: 林明玉; October 1937 – 6 April 2019) was a Chinese politician. He served as Communist Party Secretary of Haikou, the capital of Hainan province, and vice chairman of the Hainan Chinese People's Political Consultative Conference and the Hainan Provincial People's Congress.

== Biography ==
Lin was born in October 1937 in Danzhou, Hainan, China. He participated in the Chinese Communist Revolution as a 10-year-old child, and joined the Communist Party in 1960. After graduating from Hainan Overseas Chinese High School, he studied in the Department of Chinese of Minzu University of China from 1958 to 1962.

Lin worked for the government of Hainan (then a prefecture of Guangdong province) after university. He became Party Secretary of Lingshui Li Autonomous County in January 1977, and was promoted to Party Secretary of Haikou City in December 1983. In 1988, when Hainan was elevated to the status of province, Haikou was designated as its capital and Lin became the first Party Secretary of the provincial capital.

In 1990, Lin was appointed acting secretary-general of Hainan Province. He served as Vice Chairman of the Hainan Chinese People's Political Consultative Conference from 1993 to 1998, and as Vice Chairman of the Hainan Provincial People's Congress from 1998 to 2003. He retired in December 2003.

Lin died on 6 April 2019 in Haikou, at the age of 81.
