= Zhan Ziqing =

Chinese historian (1937–2019)

Zhan Ziqing (Chinese: 詹子庆; 1 November 1937 – 12 February 2019) was a Chinese historian with a specialization in ancient Chinese history (pre-Qin dynasty). He was a distinguished professor and Vice President of Northeast Normal University in Changchun.

== Biography ==
Zhan was born on 1 November 1937 in Yangzhou, Jiangsu, Republic of China. After attending Yangzhou High School, Taizhou Normal School, and Shanghai Industrial Management School, he worked in a factory in Harbin from 1954 to 1957.

In September 1957, Zhan entered Northeast Normal University to study history, and was hired as a faculty member after graduating in July 1961. In 1979, he studied ancient Chinese history with the eminent scholar Xu Zhongshu at Sichuan University.

Zhan became an associate professor of Northeast Normal University in 1983 and a full professor in 1988. He also served as vice chair of the Department of History, Vice President of the university (1986–1994), and Chief Editor of the university's publishing house (1996–1998).

Zhan's research was focused on early Chinese civilization, pre-Qin history and documents, and ancient rites. He wrote several influential books, including Pre-Qin History (先秦史), Approaching the Xia Civilization (走近夏代文明), The History and Civilization of the Xia Dynasty (夏史与夏代文明), and A History of Ancient China (中国古代史), which has been widely used as a textbook in Chinese universities. He also published more than 50 academic papers.

Zhan was a co-founder of the China Pre-Qin History Society and served as President of Jilin Province History Society.

On 12 February 2019, Zhan died in Changchun, at the age of 81.
