= 2019 in the United Kingdom =

Events from the year 2019 in the United Kingdom. Lack of agreement on how to proceed with withdrawing from the EU led to substantial political turmoil during this year culminating in the 2019 General election in which the pro-Brexit Conservative party gained a significant majority of seats.

== Incumbents ==
- Monarch – Elizabeth II
- Prime Minister
  - Theresa May (Conservative) (until 24 July)
  - Boris Johnson (Conservative) (starting 24 July)

== Events ==
=== January ===
- 1 January – Regulator Ofgem introduces a new energy price cap for households in England, Scotland and Wales.
- 2 January – Rail fares in England and Wales rise by an average of 3.1%. Meanwhile, ScotRail announces average rail fare increases of 2.8%.
- 3 January – The bakery chain Greggs launches a meat free version of its sausage rolls.
- 4 January – The engineering arm of collapsed Monarch Airlines falls into administration, with the loss of 450 jobs.
- 7 January – A 10-year plan for NHS England is unveiled. As a result of Barnett consequentials, a proportionate share of extra funding will be transferred to the Scottish Parliament, Welsh Assembly and Northern Ireland Executive.
- 8 January – MPs back an amendment to the Finance Bill, by 303 to 296 votes, to limit the Treasury's powers in a no-deal Brexit scenario.
- 9 January – MPs back Dominic Grieve's amendment to the EU withdrawal agreement, by 308 to 297 votes, compelling the government to return to Parliament within three days if the deal is voted down the following week.
- 14 January – Conservative Party whip Gareth Johnson resigns, saying he cannot support the government in the forthcoming vote on Theresa May's Brexit withdrawal agreement.
- 15 January – The House of Commons rejects Theresa May's deal on the UK's withdrawal from the European Union by 432 votes to 202. The 230 vote margin is the largest defeat for a government motion in 100 years.
- 16 January – Theresa May's government survives a no confidence vote by 325 to 306.
- 17 January
  - The 97-year-old Duke of Edinburgh, Prince Philip is involved in a car crash while driving near the Queen's Sandringham estate. He is unhurt, "but very, very shocked and shaken."
  - Japan's Hitachi announces the suspension of work on the £20bn Wylfa Newydd nuclear plant in Wales amid concerns over rising costs, putting thousands of jobs at risk.
- 21 January
  - Theresa May outlines her Brexit "plan B" to the House of Commons, scrapping the £65 fee EU citizens were going to have to pay to secure a right to live in the UK after Brexit.
  - Three separate security alerts are raised after reports of car hijackings in Derry, two days after a bomb exploded in a car outside its courthouse.
  - 2019 Piper PA-46 Malibu crash: An aircraft carrying newly-signed Cardiff City F.C. footballer Emiliano Sala and pilot David Ibbotson en route from Nantes, France, to Cardiff, Wales, goes missing over the English Channel. Sala's body is recovered on 7 February.
- 22 January
  - The EU confirms it will enforce a hard border between Northern Ireland and the Irish Republic in the event of a no-deal Brexit, despite the risk it would pose to peace.
  - The UK café chain Patisserie Valerie collapses into administration after rescue talks with banks fail.
- 24 January – Former Scottish First Minister Alex Salmond is arrested by police and charged with multiple counts of sexual assault and two of attempted rape.
- 25 January – The European Medicines Agency (EMA) closes its office at Canary Wharf, London, in preparation for its move to Amsterdam.
- 28 January – A letter from the British Retail Consortium, signed by major food retailers including Asda, McDonald's and Sainsbury's, warns of empty shelves and higher prices in the event of a no-deal Brexit.
- 29 January
  - MPs vote on a series of seven Brexit amendments. This includes a proposal to renegotiate the Irish backstop, which is passed with a majority of 16.
  - Labour MP for Peterborough Fiona Onasanya is sentenced to three months imprisonment having earlier been found guilty of perverting the course of justice for lying about who was driving her car when caught speeding. Her imprisonment makes her the first sitting MP to be jailed in 28 years.
- 30 January
  - The EU's chief negotiator, Michel Barnier, rejects calls to reopen the Brexit deal and says the Irish backstop will not be renegotiated, despite the UK's request.
  - A High Court judge approves a £166bn (€190bn) transfer of assets by Barclays bank to its Irish division as a result of Brexit disruption.
- 31 January – A report by the Society of Motor Manufacturers (SMMT) states that investment in the British car industry fell by 46.5% in 2018 as a result of Brexit uncertainty.

=== February ===
- 1 February
  - Hundreds of schools across Wales and southern parts of England are closed due to snow and icy conditions.
  - Leave.EU and Eldon Insurance owned by its founder Arron Banks are fined £120,000 over data law breaches.
  - A 37-year-old mother who mutilated her three-year-old daughter becomes the first person in the UK to be found guilty of female genital mutilation (FGM).
- 3 February
  - Apetito and Bidfood, two major suppliers to care homes and hospitals, report that they are stockpiling food in case of disruption caused by Brexit.
  - Car manufacturer Nissan confirms that it will not be moving production of its X-Trail SUV from Japan to Sunderland, citing the falling sales of diesel cars in Europe as the reason, adding that: "While we have taken this decision for business reasons, the continued uncertainty around the UK's future relationship with the EU is not helping companies like ours to plan for the future".
- 4 February – The wreckage of the PA-46 Malibu that was carrying footballer Emiliano Sala and pilot David Ibbotson is found underwater and a body is seen within it.
- 5 February – HMV is acquired out of administration by Canadian retailer Sunrise Records, safeguarding the future of nearly 1,500 staff.
- 7 February
  - The Office for National Statistics reports that knife crime in England and Wales is at its highest level since records began in 1946, with the number of fatal stabbings the previous year being the most ever reported.
  - The Bank of England keeps interest rates on hold at 0.75%, but warns of a slowdown in economic growth during 2019, which it says could be the worst year since 2009.
  - The British Horseracing Authority (BHA) cancels all horse racing in Great Britain until at least 13 February after an outbreak of equine influenza.
  - A body is recovered from the wreckage of the PA-46 Malibu which vanished over the English Channel on 21 January. Dorset Police later identify it as that of Emiliano Sala.
- 14 February – Theresa May suffers a fresh defeat in the Commons on her Brexit strategy, losing the vote by 303 to 258.
- 15 February – Thousands of school pupils around the UK go on strike as part of a global campaign for action on climate change.
- 16 February – Regional airline Flybmi ceases operations and files for administration, blaming Brexit as the main cause of its collapse.
- 18 February
  - Seven MPs – Chuka Umunna, Luciana Berger, Chris Leslie, Angela Smith, Mike Gapes, Gavin Shuker and Ann Coffey – announce that they have resigned from the Labour Party to form The Independent Group.
  - Plans by Japanese carmaker Honda to close its Swindon factory by 2022 are leaked to the press, a day before the official announcement.
- 19 February – MP Joan Ryan resigns from the Labour Party to join The Independent Group.
- 20 February
  - Three Conservative Party MPs – Heidi Allen, Sarah Wollaston and Anna Soubry – resign from their party to join The Independent Group.
  - Home Secretary Sajid Javid confirms the intention to strip Shamima Begum, who left the UK as a teenager to join Islamic State in Syria in 2015, of her UK citizenship.
- 21 February – A youth is found guilty through a unanimous verdict for the abduction, rape and murder of six-year-old Alesha MacPhail on 2 July 2018. Lord Matthews describes him as "committing some of the most wicked and evil crimes this court has ever heard of in decades of dealing with depravity" and agrees to reverse the naming restriction due to the ‘unique’ nature of the case - the first in Scottish history - and the defendant is named as 16-year-old Aaron Campbell.
- 22 February – Dudley North MP Ian Austin resigns from the Labour Party saying the party has failed to tackle antisemitism, but says he has no plans to join the Independent Group.
- 23 February – Roy Hodgson becomes the oldest man to manage in the Premier League (with Crystal Palace F.C.), at the age of 71 years and 198 days.
- 25 February – A temperature of 20.3 °C (68.5 °F) is reported in Trawsgoed, Ceredigion, the UK's highest on record for the month of February.
- 26 February
  - The Shadow Brexit Secretary, Keir Starmer, states that Labour will back a second EU referendum with remain on the ballot if Theresa May's deal gets through parliament.
  - Theresa May states that MPs will be given the choice between no-deal Brexit or a Brexit delay, if they reject her plan the following month.
  - The government publishes its assessment of the impact of a no-deal Brexit.
  - The UK winter temperature record is broken for a second consecutive day, as the Met Office records 21.2 °C (70.2 °F) in Kew Gardens, London. Various huge wildfires are reported, the largest being at Saddleworth Moor in West Yorkshire.

=== March ===
- 1 March – The UK Government announces it has paid out £33,000,000 to settle a dispute with Eurotunnel over the awarding of ferry contracts, which was led by Transport Secretary Chris Grayling, to cope with a no-deal Brexit.
- 7 March
  - Luxury fashion retailer LK Bennett goes into administration.
  - The Institute and Faculty of Actuaries reports evidence of slowing life expectancy in the UK, which first emerged in 2010–2011 and is now "a trend as opposed to a blip".
- 12 March
  - The House of Commons rejects Theresa May's deal on the UK's withdrawal from the European Union for a second time, by 391 votes to 242.
  - Three climbers are killed and another injured in an avalanche on Ben Nevis.
- 13 March
  - MPs vote by 321 votes to 278 to accept an amended government motion to reject the UK leaving the European Union without a deal.
  - Chancellor Philip Hammond says that gas heating for new houses will be prohibited by a date which he gives as 2025, although gas hobs will still be allowed.
- 14 March – MPs vote by 412 to 202 in favour of requesting that the UK's withdrawal from the European Union be delayed beyond 29 March.
- 15 March – Thousands of school pupils around the UK go on strike as part of a global campaign for action on climate change.
- 18 March – The Speaker of the House of Commons, John Bercow, quoting a parliamentary rule dating back to 1604, declares that a third "meaningful vote" on the Brexit deal cannot proceed unless it contains substantial changes. Ministers warn of a "constitutional crisis", with just eleven days until the UK is due to leave the EU.
- 20 March – Prime Minister Theresa May writes a letter to EU Council President Donald Tusk, requesting a three-month extension to Article 50.
- 21 March
  - The TUC and CBI write a letter to the Prime Minister saying the UK faces a "national emergency" due to Brexit and urging May to embrace an alternative plan.
  - The EU agrees to delay Brexit until 22 May 2019, if MPs approve a withdrawal deal; or to 12 April if they do not.
  - Aaron Campbell is sentenced to life imprisonment with a minimum term of 27 years for the murder of six-year-old Alesha MacPhail. Lord Matthews says Campbell's crime had caused "revulsion and disbelief" and describes Campbell as a "cold, callous, calculating, remorseless and dangerous individual".
- 23 March – Hundreds of thousands of protesters flock to London for the second People's Vote march, asking the UK Government for a second referendum on leaving the EU and to permanently revoke Article 50.
- 24 March – An online e-petition calling on the government to revoke Article 50 reaches 5,000,000 signatures.
- 25 March – MPs defeat the government by 329 to 302 as they vote in favour of an amendment by Oliver Letwin, giving Parliament the option to hold a series of "indicative votes" on Brexit.
- 26 March – The European Parliament votes by 348 to 278 in favour of the controversial Article 13 of the European Union Directive on Copyright in the Digital Single Market, which expands legal liability for websites.
- 27 March
  - The Department for Transport says that the United Kingdom will adopt speed limiting technology that will become mandatory for all new vehicles sold in Europe from 2022, after new rules were provisionally agreed by the European Union.
  - MPs back the statutory instrument changing the Brexit date in the EU Withdrawal Act by 441 votes to 105, a majority of 336.
  - None of MPs' eight proposed options (indicative votes) for Brexit gains a majority following a House of Commons vote.
- 29 March
  - The recently formed Independent Group applies to become a political party with the name "Change UK – The Independent Group" and names Heidi Allen as interim leader.
  - MPs reject Theresa May's EU withdrawal agreement for a third time, by 344 votes to 286.
  - A motion of no confidence against pro-EU Conservative MP Dominic Grieve is carried by his local party, 182 votes to 131.
- 31 March – The e-petition calling on the UK Government to revoke Article 50 reaches 6,000,000 signatures, doing so a day before it is due to be debated by parliament.

=== April ===
- 1 April
  - For the second time, none of four proposed options (indicative votes) for Brexit gain a majority following a House of Commons vote. A customs union with the EU, a "Common Market 2.0", a second referendum and a vote on whether to revoke Article 50 all fail to win clear backing from MPs.
  - Immediately following the indicative votes on Brexit, MP Nick Boles quits the Conservative party, with a speech criticising his former colleagues for refusing to compromise on the options.
  - The UK's National Living Wage rises from £7.83 to £8.21, an increase of 4.9%.
  - London Liverpool Street, London King's Cross and Edinburgh Waverley become the last of Network Rail's stations to abolish charges to their public toilets.
- 2 April – In a statement following a Cabinet meeting, Prime Minister Theresa May announces her intention to extend Article 50 again and work with Opposition Leader Jeremy Corbyn on a plan, but keep the withdrawal agreement as part of her deal.
- 3 April
  - Prosecutors seek a retrial in the case of the police match commander at the Hillsborough disaster David Duckenfield, after a jury fails to reach a verdict.
  - A bill by Labour MP Yvette Cooper to force the Prime Minister to ask the EU for an extension to Article 50, in order to avoid a no-deal Brexit, passes the House of Commons by 313 votes to 312.
- 5 April – Theresa May writes to the EU requesting a Brexit extension until 30 June 2019. EU ministers respond by saying the letter is too vague to justify an extension being offered.
- 6 April – Tiger Roll wins the 2019 Grand National, the second consecutive year it has won the race.
- 8 April
  - Jaguar Land Rover shuts down production for a week because of uncertainties around Brexit.
  - London's Ultra Low Emission Zone comes into effect.
- 9 April – Department store Debenhams goes into administration, after a last-ditch rescue offer from Mike Ashley's Sports Direct was rejected.
- 10 April – The UK and the EU agree an Article 50 extension to 31 October 2019. No reopening of the withdrawal agreement negotiations is allowed and the UK "must hold the elections to the European Parliament" on 23 May, or it will be forced to leave on 1 June 2019.
- 11 April – WikiLeaks co-founder Julian Assange is arrested after seven years of living in the Ecuadorian embassy in London.
- 12 April – Former UKIP leader Nigel Farage launches the Brexit Party.
- 15–22 April – Demonstrations by the climate change activist group Extinction Rebellion cause disruption in central London, blocking roads and resulting in over 1,000 arrests, with 53 people charged for various offences. A "pause" in the protest is announced on 21 April, although the group continues to base itself in Marble Arch.
- 17 April – The UK Government announces it will introduce an age verification system designed to stop internet users under the age of eighteen from viewing pornographic websites, which will come into force on 15 July but in practice is never brought into effect.
- 18 April – 29-year-old journalist and author Lyra McKee is shot dead amid rioting in Derry, Northern Ireland, with police treating it as a "terrorist incident" and suspecting the New IRA.
- 22 April
  - Leaders from 70 local Conservative Associations sign a petition calling for a vote of no confidence in Theresa May. The non-binding vote, to be determined by 800 of the party's senior officials, would be the first time such an instance has occurred.
  - The hottest Easter Monday on record in all four nations of the UK is confirmed by the Met Office, with 25 °C (77 °F) reported at Heathrow, Northolt and Wisley.
- 24 April – The Conservative Party's 1922 Committee votes against changing the party's rules regarding leadership challenges, but asks for clarity on when Prime Minister Theresa May will step down from office.
- 25 April
  - The government announces it will launch a formal inquiry into the leaking of discussions about Chinese telecommunications firm Huawei at the National Security Council after The Daily Telegraph published details of a meeting concerning plans to use the firm to help build the 5G network.
  - The Foreign Office warns against all but essential travel to Sri Lanka following the Easter Sunday bombings in which eight Britons were among the dead.
- 26 April
  - Prime Minister Theresa May and Irish Taoiseach Leo Varadkar issue a joint statement setting out a new process of talks designed to restore devolution to Northern Ireland, to begin on 7 May.
  - Department store Debenhams announces plans to close 22 branches in 2019.

=== May ===
- 1 May
  - Peterborough Member of Parliament Fiona Onasanya becomes the first MP to be removed by a recall petition after 19,261 of her constituents voted for her to be removed from office. Onasanya's recall petition had been automatically triggered as a result of her conviction for perverting the course of justice, an offence for which she was imprisoned in January.
  - WikiLeaks co-founder Julian Assange is sentenced to 50 weeks in jail for breaching bail conditions.
  - Defence Secretary Gavin Williamson is dismissed after a leak from a National Security Council meeting in which plans by Chinese firm Huawei to contribute to the UK's 5G network were discussed. He is replaced by Penny Mordaunt.
- 2 May – 2019 United Kingdom local elections: The Lib Dems, Greens and independents make gains in the local elections at the expense of the Conservatives, while Labour and UKIP also suffer losses.
- 4 May – The Metropolitan Police says that the National Security Council leak about Huawei "did not amount to a criminal offence".
- 6 May
  - The Duchess of Sussex gives birth to a son, Archie Mountbatten-Windsor.
  - The World Snooker Championship concludes with Judd Trump defeating John Higgins 18–9 in the final to win his first world title.
- 8 May – A British teenager, Isabelle Holdaway, 17, is reported to be the first patient to receive a genetically modified phage therapy to treat a drug-resistant infection.
- 9 May – Broadcaster Danny Baker is dismissed from BBC Radio 5 Live after tweeting a "royal baby" image of a chimpanzee.
- 13 May – The Jeremy Kyle Show is suspended indefinitely following the death of a participant shortly after appearing on an unbroadcast programme. The show is axed by ITV two days later.
- 16 May – Boris Johnson confirms that he will run for the Conservative Party leadership after Theresa May stands down.
- 17 May
  - Brexit talks between Labour and the Conservatives end without agreement, following six weeks of cross-party debate, with Jeremy Corbyn saying negotiations have "gone as far as they can."
  - The Ministry of Justice announces plans to introduce "Helen's Law", which would require a person convicted of murder without the presence of a body to reveal the location of their victim's remains before being considered for parole.

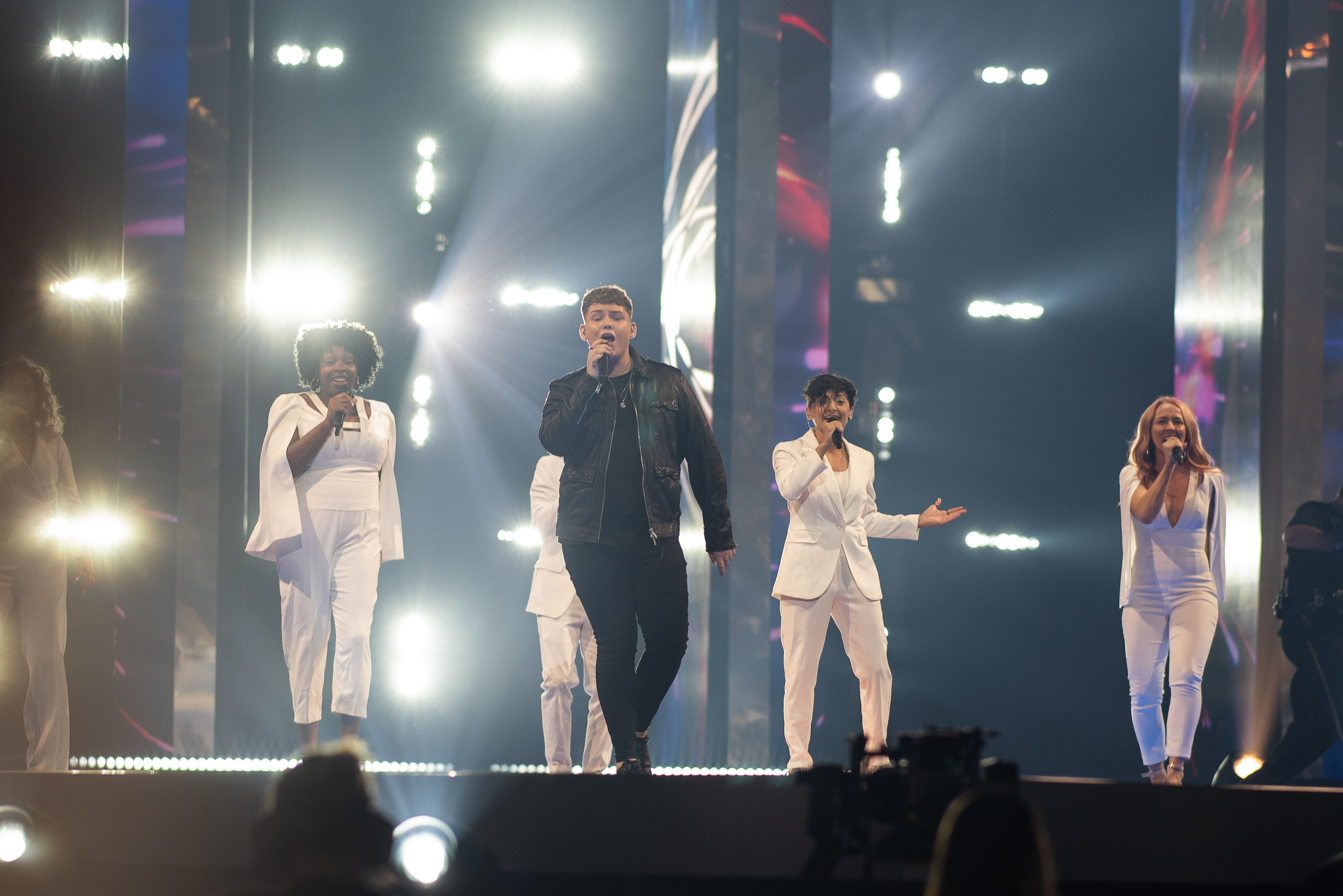
British act at the Eurovision dress rehearsal

- 18 May – Eurovision Song Contest 2019 (Tel Aviv): The United Kingdom, represented by Michael Rice, finishes in last place, with a score of 11.
- 21 May – Jamie Oliver's restaurant group collapses into administration, putting 1,300 jobs at risk.
- 22 May
  - British Steel Limited enters insolvency, putting 5,000 UK jobs directly at risk and a further 20,000 in the supply chain, following a breakdown in rescue talks between the government and the company's owner, Greybull.
  - Andrea Leadsom resigns as Leader of the House of Commons, saying she no longer believes the government's approach will deliver Brexit. She is replaced the following day by Mel Stride.
- 23 May – Elections to the European Parliament are held.

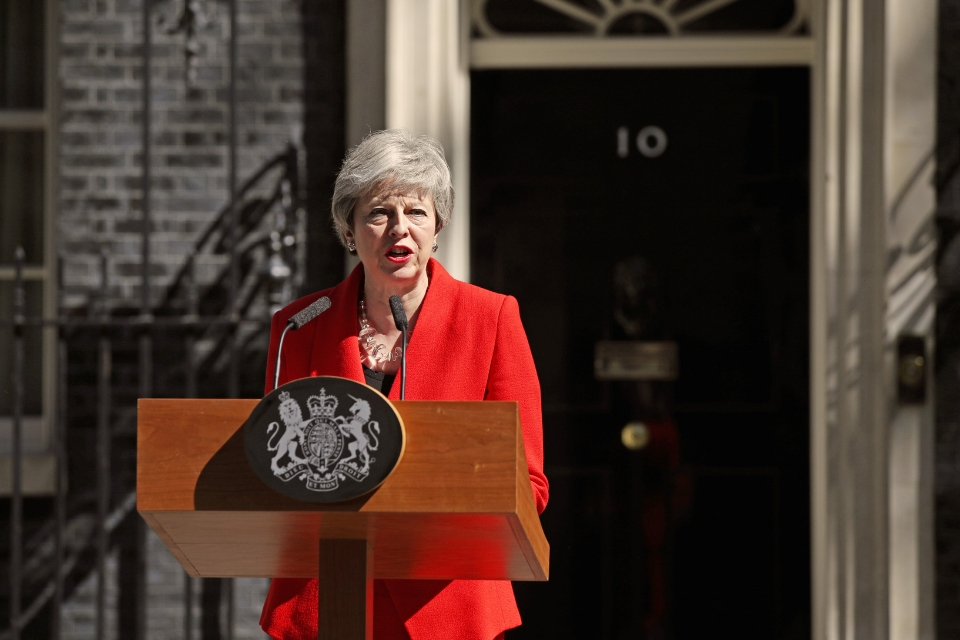
Theresa May announces her resignation

- 24 May – Prime Minister Theresa May announces her resignation as Conservative Party leader, effective 7 June.
- 26 May – The first black female Oxbridge master, Sonia Alleyne, is appointed to lead Jesus College, Cambridge, from October.
- 28 May
  - Alastair Campbell, the former communications chief to Tony Blair, is expelled from the Labour Party, after publicly stating that he voted for the Liberal Democrats during the European Parliamentary elections.
  - The Speaker of the House of Commons, John Bercow announces that he plans to stay on as Speaker possibly until 2022, saying it is not "sensible to vacate the chair" while there are major issues before parliament.
- 29 May – In the first all-English UEFA Cup/Europa League final since 1972 and the tournament's first final between teams from the same city, Chelsea defeat Arsenal 4–1 at the Olympic Stadium in Baku, Azerbaijan. This is Chelsea's second Europa League title.
- 30 May – The UK's first 5G mobile network becomes operational, initially covering parts of six cities: Belfast, Birmingham, Cardiff, Edinburgh, London and Manchester.

=== June ===
- 1 June – In the first all-English UEFA Champions League final since 2008, Liverpool defeat Tottenham Hotspur 2–0 at the Metropolitano Stadium in Madrid, Spain. This is Liverpool's sixth European Cup title.
- 3 June – U.S. President Donald Trump begins a three-day state visit to the UK.
- 4 June – Six Change UK MPs – Luciana Berger, Gavin Shuker, Angela Smith, Chuka Umunna, Sarah Wollaston and interim party leader Heidi Allen – announce their resignation from the party. The remaining five MPs, remain in the party, with Brexit and Justice spokeswoman Anna Soubry becoming leader.
- 6 June
  - American carmaker Ford announces the closure of its Ford Bridgend Engine Plant in September 2020, with the loss of 1,700 jobs.
  - Peterborough by election: Labour retains the seat, with the Brexit Party finishing in second place and the Conservatives in third. The by-election was held because of the previous Labour MP having been removed as the result of a recall petition.
- 7 June – Prime Minister Theresa May resigns as Leader of the Conservative Party, paving the way for a leadership contest.
- 10 June – The BBC announces that, from June 2020, it will stop providing free television licences for over-75s who do not receive pension credit.
- 12 June
  - Theresa May announces a new legally binding target to reach net zero greenhouse gas emissions by 2050, making the United Kingdom the first major industrialised nation to propose this goal.
  - In a vote of 309–298, MPs reject a plan by Labour to take control of Parliament's timetable, which would have enabled the tabling of legislation to prevent a no-deal Brexit on 31 October.
- 13 June – Former Labour MP, then-Change UK MP, then Independent MP, Chuka Umunna, defects to the Liberal Democrats.
- 18 June – Heathrow Airport publishes a masterplan for construction of a third runway by 2026 and completion of the airport's expansion by 2050.
- 19 June
  - Tendai Muswere becomes the first person in the UK to be convicted of illegally manufacturing a firearm using a 3D printer.
  - The Isle of Wight is awarded "Biosphere Reserve" status by UNESCO, becoming the seventh UK location to receive this designation.
- 20 June – In a case brought by Campaign Against Arms Trade, the Court of Appeal rules that UK arms sales to Saudi Arabia are unlawful.
- 21 June
  - Conservative Party MP Chris Davies loses his seat after a recall petition in response to his conviction for submitting false expenses claims. This forces a by-election in Brecon and Radnorshire.
  - Conservative Party MP Mark Field is suspended as a Minister, after video footage shows him grabbing and pushing a female activist who interrupted Chancellor of the Exchequer Philip Hammond's Mansion House Speech.
- 29 June – The Met Office records some of the hottest UK temperatures for June in 40 years, with Heathrow and Northolt in west London reaching 34C (93.2F).

=== July ===
- 2 July – FIFA Women's World Cup: The most-watched British television broadcast of the year, 11.7 million viewers watch the England football team's 1–2 defeat to USA in the semi-final in Parc Olympique Lyonnais (Stade de Lyon) in Lyon, France.
- 5 July
  - Eight gang members who ran the biggest modern-day slavery network ever exposed in the UK, involving more than 400 victims in the West Midlands, are jailed with sentences ranging from three to 11 years.
  - Ex-English Defence League leader Tommy Robinson is found guilty of contempt of court over a Facebook broadcast.
  - Secretary of State for Justice David Gauke confirms that "Helen's Law" will be adopted in England and Wales. This will provide that convicted murderers who have hidden their victims' bodies cannot be considered for parole until they reveal the locations.
- 7 July – The Trump administration is labelled "inept", "insecure" and "incompetent" in leaked emails from the British Ambassador to the United States, Sir Kim Darroch.
- 9 July – MPs vote by 294 to 293 in favour of a bid to require ministers to give fortnightly updates on the situation in Northern Ireland. The plan, drawn up by Dominic Grieve, is designed to make it harder for the next prime minister to suspend Parliament and cause a no-deal Brexit.
- 10 July
  - Sir Kim Darroch resigns as UK ambassador to the US, amid the ongoing row over leaked emails critical of the Trump administration.
  - Formula One and Silverstone agree a new five-year deal to keep the British Grand Prix on the calendar following two years of renegotiations between Liberty Media and the BRDC.
- 11 July – Tommy Robinson, having been found guilty of contempt of court on 5 July, is sentenced at the Old Bailey to nine months in prison.
- 12 July
  - The first fatal collision involving an e-scooter in Britain occurs, killing TV presenter and YouTube star Emily Hartridge in Battersea, London.
  - Former Blue Peter presenter John Leslie is charged with sexually assaulting a 30-year-old woman in Westminster in December 2008.
- 14 July – "Super Sunday" in sport: England win the Cricket World Cup final (played at Lord's) for the first time, beating New Zealand on boundary count after a tied match; British driver Lewis Hamilton wins a record sixth Formula 1 British Grand Prix at Silverstone; and in the 2019 Wimbledon Championships – Men's Singles tennis, Novak Djokovic (Serbia) beats Roger Federer (Switzerland) in the longest ever final at four hours 57 minutes. Djokovic becomes the first player since Bob Falkenberg at the 1948 Wimbledon Championships to save multiple match points and win a Wimbledon final.
- 18 July – MPs vote again in favour of amendments to stop the next prime minister proroguing Parliament in the autumn to facilitate a no-deal Brexit.
- 19 July – The Iranian Navy of the Islamic Revolutionary Guard Corps captures British tanker Stena Impero and temporarily seizes British-operated and Liberian-flagged tanker Mesdar in the Persian Gulf. The Foreign Secretary, Jeremy Hunt, warns there will be "serious consequences" if Iran does not release the tanker.
- 22 July
  - Conservative MP for Dover, Charlie Elphicke, is charged with three counts of sexual assault against two women.
  - Carl Beech is found guilty of making false allegations of murder and child sexual abuse against UK public figures. He is sentenced to 18 years in prison on 26 July.
  - Jo Swinson is elected by party members as the new leader of the Liberal Democrats, succeeding Sir Vince Cable. She becomes both the first woman to lead the party and its youngest ever leader at age 39.
- 23 July – Boris Johnson is chosen as the new Conservative Party leader in a ballot of party members, beating Jeremy Hunt by 92,153 votes to 46,656.

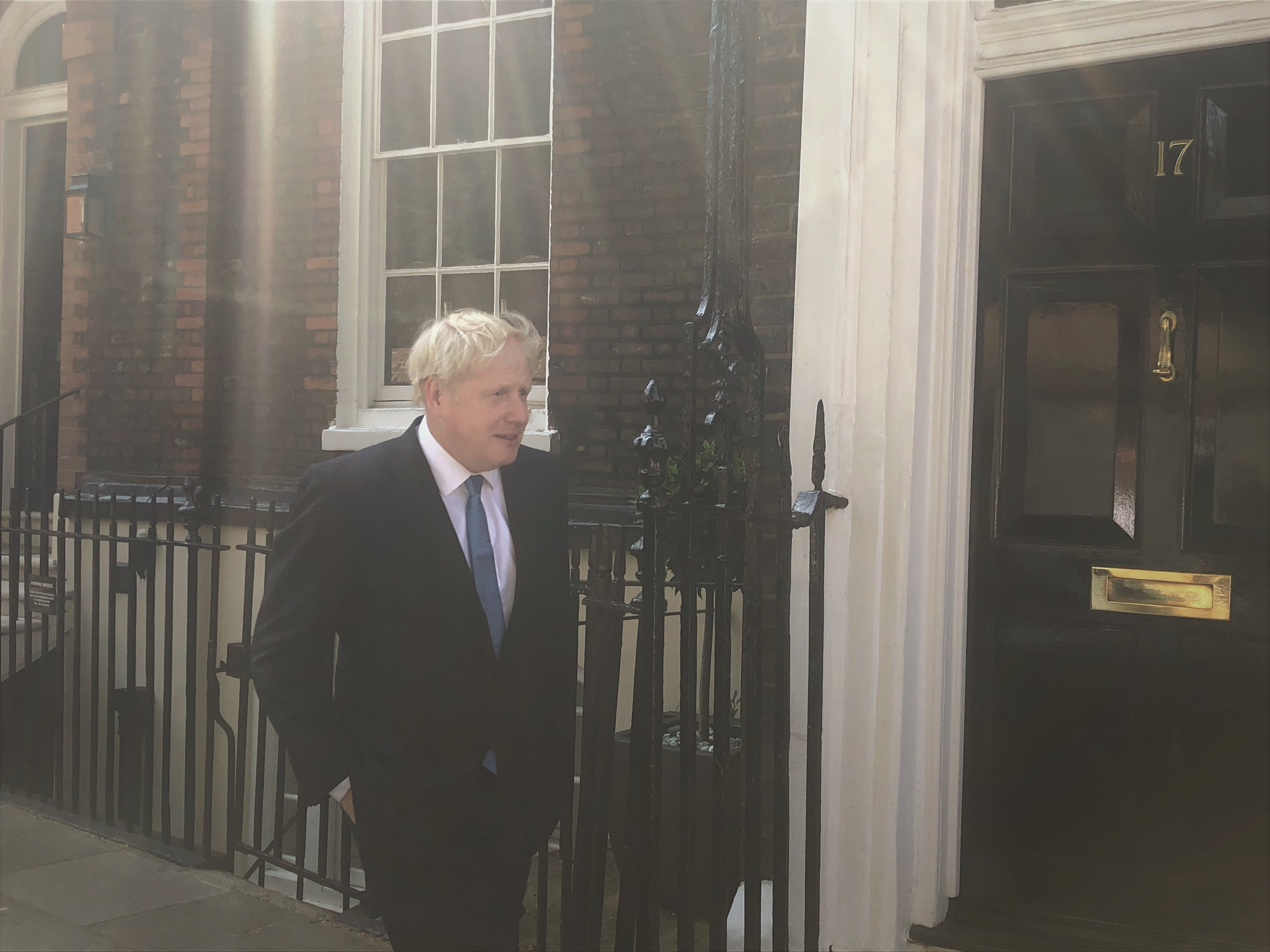
Boris Johnson on the day of his victory in the Conservative leadership contest

- 24 July – Theresa May formally tenders her resignation as Prime Minister to the Queen and is succeeded by Boris Johnson.
- 28 July
  - One of the eight cooling towers at Ferrybridge C Power Station is demolished with explosives in a test explosion.
  - Boris Johnson subsequently begins to form his cabinet, with Sajid Javid appointed as Chancellor of the Exchequer, Priti Patel as Home Secretary, and Dominic Raab as Foreign Secretary and First Secretary of State.
- 25 July – The UK experiences its hottest day on record until July 2022, with a temperature of 38.7 °C (101.7 °F) at Cambridge, beating the previous high of 38.5 °C (101.3 °F) in Faversham, Kent, on 10 August 2003.

=== August ===
- 1 August
  - Parts of the Derbyshire towns of Whaley Bridge, Furness Vale and New Mills are evacuated, with 1,500 residents being moved as a precaution, after concrete slabs on the dam spillway of the Toddbrook Reservoir partially collapse.
  - The government announces an extra £2.1bn of funding to prepare for a no-deal Brexit, doubling the amount of money it has set aside for 2019, taking the total since June 2016 to £6.3bn.
  - Liberal Democrat MP Jane Dodds wins the 2019 Brecon and Radnorshire by-election, beating the incumbent Conservative Chris Davies and leaving the Tories with a Commons working majority of just one.
- 5 August – The historic Belfast shipyard Harland and Wolff, which built the RMS Titanic and other well-known ships, ceases trading.
- 9 August
  - Data from the Office for National Statistics shows that the UK economy shrank by 0.2% in the second quarter of 2019, its first contraction since 2012.
  - A major power blackout hits parts of England and Wales, affecting nearly a million people and causing widespread travel disruption.
- 10 August – Richard Braine is elected as leader of the UK Independence Party, succeeding Gerard Batten.
- 15 August – Former Conservative and Change UK MP Sarah Wollaston joins the Liberal Democrats, saying it is the best way for her to fight to keep Britain in the European Union.
- 16 August – The Turkish Armed Forces Assistance Fund (known as Oyak) announces that it plans to take over British Steel by the end of the year.
- 18 August
  - Reports emerge that the British–Canadian Muslim convert Jack Letts, alleged to be a member of ISIL and nicknamed "Jihadi Jack" by the media, has had his British citizenship revoked by the Home Office.
  - More than 100 MPs write to Prime Minister Boris Johnson calling for a recall of Parliament to debate concerns that the UK faces "a national emergency" over Brexit.
  - The three remaining cooling towers at Didcot power station, a focal point of the Oxfordshire skyline for 50 years, are demolished. An electricity pole is damaged in the collapse, leaving at least 40,000 homes without power.
- 22 August – Boris Johnson meets French president Emmanuel Macron in Paris, insisting that the Brexit impasse can be broken "with energy and creativity". Macron reiterates that the Republic of Ireland–Northern Ireland backstop plan is "indispensable" to preserving political stability and the single market.
- 23 August – Boris Johnson and Jeremy Corbyn express concern over major fires in the Amazon rainforest, ahead of the latest G7 summit. A spokesperson for the Department for International Trade states: "The UK remains committed to protecting the world's rainforests and will continue to do so in Brazil through our international climate finance programmes."
- 24 August – After video footage emerges of himself at Jeffrey Epstein's mansion in 2010, Prince Andrew defends his former friendship with the convicted sex offender, saying "at no stage" did he "see or suspect" any criminal behaviour.
- 25 August – The UK experiences its hottest late August bank holiday weekend on record, with temperatures reaching 33.3 °C (91.9 °F) in west London. The record for August bank holiday Monday is also broken the following day.
- 26 August – The UK's biggest ever fracking-related tremor is recorded, with a magnitude of 2.9 reported at a Cuadrilla site near Blackpool.
- 27 August
  - Opposition MPs gather in Church House, Westminster, where they agree to form "an alternative parliament" if Boris Johnson attempts to force a no-deal Brexit by prorogation. They sign a declaration, calling this threat "an undemocratic outrage at such a crucial moment for our country, and a historic constitutional crisis". Downing Street accuses the MPs of trying to sabotage negotiations with the EU.
  - Bury F.C. are expelled from the English Football League after a takeover bid collapses.
- 28 August – Boris Johnson asks the Queen to suspend Parliament from early September until 14 October. Following precedent, she approves the request. While many Brexit supporters welcome the move, the action receives widespread condemnation from those in favour of the UK remaining in the EU, triggering protests both in London and around the country.

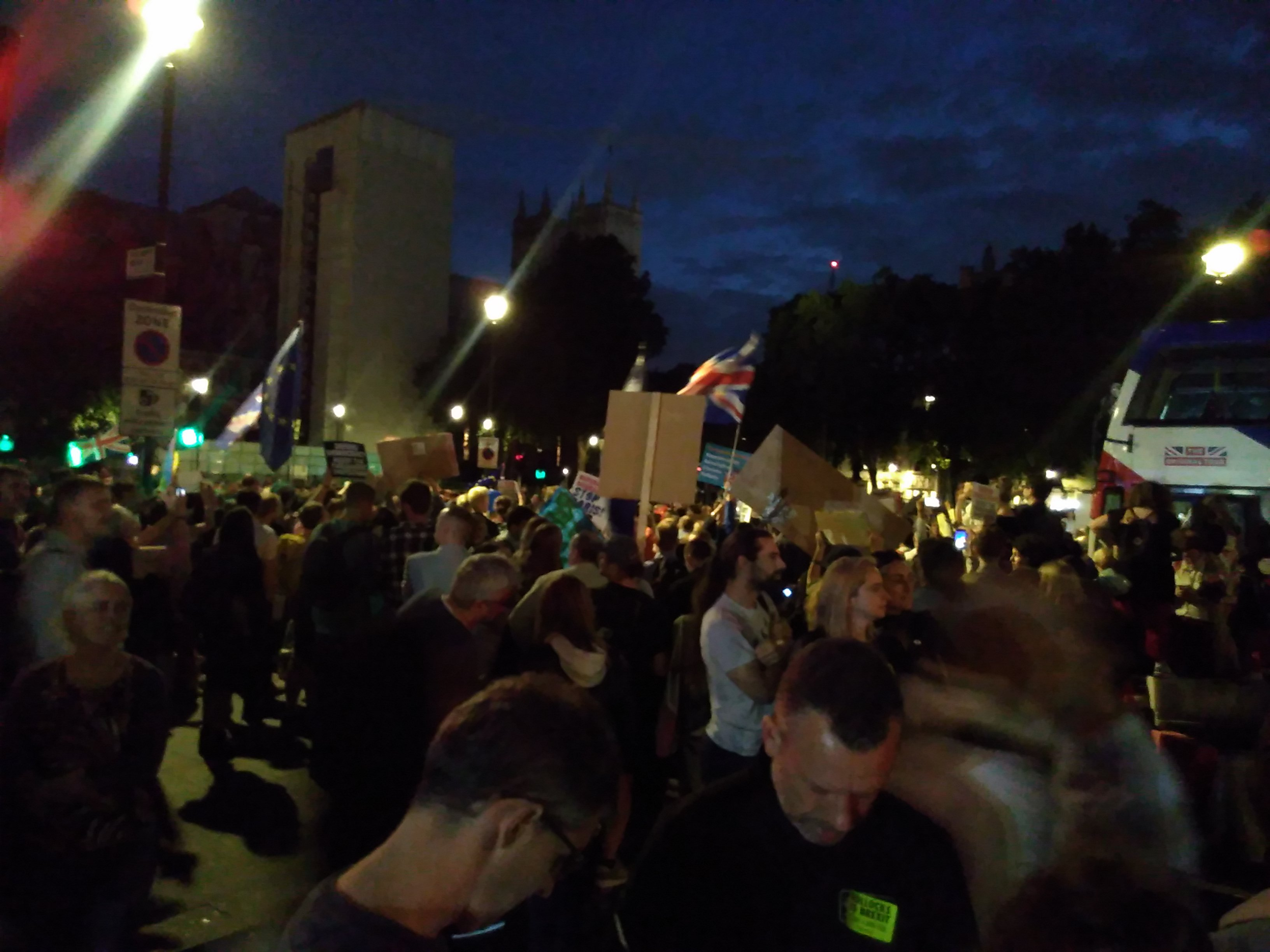
Anti-prorogation protest in Parliament square

- 29 August – Ruth Davidson resigns as leader of the Scottish Conservatives.
- 31 August – Demonstrations are held across the UK in protest at Boris Johnson's decision to suspend parliament.

=== September ===
- 2 September – In a speech outside 10 Downing Street, Boris Johnson states his opposition to calling a general election and urges MPs not to vote for "another pointless delay" to Brexit.
- 3 September
  - Pound sterling falls below $1.20, its lowest level since October 2016, before recovering the day's losses.
  - The government loses its majority in the House of Commons after Conservative MP Phillip Lee crosses the floor to join the Liberal Democrats.
  - MPs opposed to a No-deal Brexit take control of House of Commons business by 328 votes to 301. Johnson responds by telling MPs he will now push for an October general election.
  - Boris Johnson withdraws the whip from 21 Conservative MPs who voted against the government, including several former Cabinet Ministers. Notable among them are Father of The House, Ken Clarke, who had served as an MP since the 1970 general election, and Sir Nicholas Soames, grandson of former UK Prime Minister Winston Churchill.
- 4 September
  - A bill intended to block the possibility of the UK leaving the EU without a deal passes its first Commons vote by 329 to 300.
  - A Scottish judge rejects a call by 75 parliamentarians to have the government's postponement of parliament declared illegal. The judge rules that it is for politicians and voters to judge, and not the courts.
  - MPs reject Boris Johnson's motion to call a snap general election for October, failing to achieve the two-thirds Commons majority needed under the Fixed-term Parliaments Act, in a vote of 298 to 56. Labour MPs abstain from the vote.
- 5 September
  - Former Labour and Change UK MP Luciana Berger joins the Liberal Democrats.
  - Jo Johnson, brother of Boris Johnson, resigns as an MP and minister, stating he is "torn between family and national interest".
- 6 September
  - The bill designed to prevent a no deal Brexit is passed by the House of Lords.
  - Opposition parties agree not to back any further government calls for a general election in mid-October.
  - The High Court rejects a case brought by anti-Brexit campaigner Gina Miller over the suspension of parliament, ruling that it is lawful.
- 7 September
  - Work and Pensions Secretary Amber Rudd resigns from the Cabinet and surrenders the Conservative Party whip, saying she cannot "stand by" while "loyal moderate Conservatives are expelled".
  - Former Labour and Change UK MP Angela Smith joins the Liberal Democrats.
- 9 September
  - John Bercow announces that he will stand down as Speaker of the House of Commons on 31 October, or at the next general election, depending on which comes first.
  - The Benn bill, intended to stop Britain leaving the EU without a deal, is granted royal assent.
  - By a vote of 311 to 302, MPs back a motion calling for the publication of all government communications relating to no-deal Brexit planning and the suspension of Parliament.
  - A second government motion calling for an early general election fails to achieve the required super-majority, with 293 MPs voting in favour of it.
- 10 September – Parliament is prorogued amid unprecedented protests in the House of Commons from opposition MPs, with some holding up signs saying "silenced".
- 11 September
  - Three judges at Scotland's highest civil court rule that the government's prorogation of the UK Parliament is unlawful "and is thus null and of no effect." The UK's Supreme Court in London is to hear the government's appeal against the ruling next week.
  - Around 40 MPs return to work in Parliament, in protest at its suspension and to show their support for the Scottish ruling that the government's decision to prorogue is illegal.
  - In response to a motion passed by MPs on 9 September to force its release, the government publish a five-page document covering the no-deal contingency plan, Operation Yellowhammer. Ministers block the publication of personal communications about Parliament's prorogation, which were also covered by the motion.
  - Downing Street rules out the possibility of an electoral pact between the Conservatives and the Brexit Party.
- 12 September – The High Court in Belfast rejects a legal challenge against a no-deal Brexit that was brought on the argument it breaches the Good Friday Agreement.
- 13 September – Former English Defence League leader Tommy Robinson is released from prison after nine weeks.
- 14 September
  - Ex-Conservative MP Sam Gyimah, one of the 21 rebels who had the whip removed on 3 September, joins the Liberal Democrats.
  - Facebook removes a Conservative Party advertisement saying it "misused" their advertising platform in the way it presented figures from a BBC News story about the amount of money being invested in schools.
- 15 September – At their annual party conference in Bournemouth, members of the Liberal Democrats vote to scrap Brexit without a second referendum if they win the next general election.
- 17 September – The hearing of the prorogation of Parliament appeal begins at the Supreme Court in London, to decide whether the act of suspending Parliament is justiciable and lawful.
- 19 September – The Supreme Court hearing of the prorogation appeal concludes after three days and a decision is expected to be given early in the next week.
- 20 September
  - Some of the largest climate change protests ever seen are held in towns and cities across the UK as part of a worldwide day of strikes and protests, led by young people and adults, to demand action on carbon emissions.
  - An American woman says she had sex with Prince Andrew as a 17-year-old and was "trafficked" to the prince. The Duke of York denies having "any form of sexual contact or relationship" with her.
- 22 September – An article in The Sunday Times accuses Prime Minister Boris Johnson of misconduct in office while Mayor of London, alleging that US businesswoman Jennifer Arcuri received favourable treatment with the awarding of grants to her company because of her friendship with Johnson.
- 23 September – Travel company Thomas Cook collapses after 178 years in business, triggering the largest ever peacetime repatriation as 150,000 holidaymakers are left stranded.

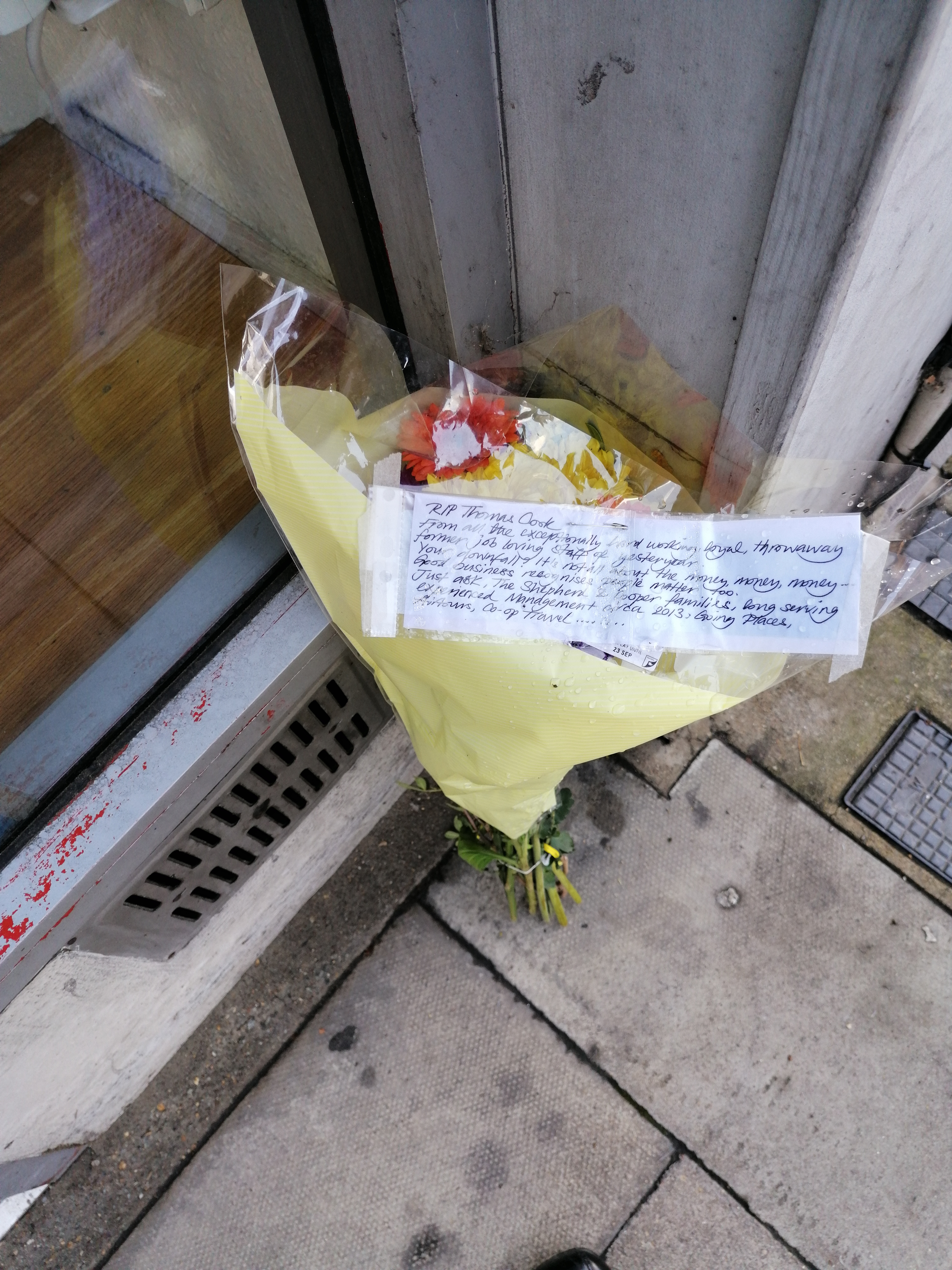
Floral bouquet left with a note expressing sadness at the closure of Thomas Cook

- 24 September – The 11 justices of the Supreme Court rule unanimously that the prorogation brought forward by Boris Johnson is both justiciable and unlawful, and therefore null and of no effect.
- 25 September – MPs return to Parliament after the ending of prorogation. Amid furious scenes in the Commons, opposition politicians accuse the Prime Minister Boris Johnson of using inflammatory language. Johnson, who described the law seeking to block a no-deal Brexit as "the surrender bill", defends his actions, later saying that "tempers need to come down" in Parliament.
- 26 September
  - A government motion for a mini-recess the following week for the Conservative Party Conference is lost by 306 votes to 289.
  - A 36-year-old man is arrested outside the office of Labour MP Jess Phillips after she tabled an urgent question in the Commons on inflammatory language. The man is said to have tried to smash windows and kick a door open while shouting "fascist".
  - Buckingham Palace announces the engagement of Princess Beatrice to British property developer Edoardo Mapelli Mozzi.
- 27 September – Prime Minister Boris Johnson is referred to the Independent Office for Police Conduct (IOPC) accused of misconduct in office while Mayor of London, an office with responsibility for overseeing policing in London.
- 28 September – Downing Street dismisses Johnson's IOPC referral as 'politically motivated'.
- 29 September – The Sunday Times carries fresh allegations about the relationship between Boris Johnson and Jennifer Arcuri, alleging the two were engaged in an affair; Johnson denies any conflict of interest. Downing Street also denies an allegation from a female journalist that Johnson squeezed her thigh, and that of another woman, at a lunch in 1999.
- 30 September – Following a meeting of opposition party leaders chaired by Jeremy Corbyn, the Labour leader says he will back a motion of no confidence in Boris Johnson "at a point we can win it and take no-deal off the table".

=== October ===
- 1 October
  - The Office for National Statistics reports that 726 homeless people died in England and Wales in 2018, a 22% rise from 2017 and the highest increase since records began.
  - Torrential rain brings flooding to many parts of Great Britain with dozens of warnings issued by the Environment Agency. Some areas in the Midlands, Wales and southern England are hit by a week's rain in just one hour.
- 2 October
  - Johnson publishes his Brexit plan, which includes proposals to replace the Irish backstop. It would create an "all-island regulatory zone", meaning that Northern Ireland essentially stays in the European Single Market for agricultural and industrial goods.
  - The government announces fresh plans to prorogue parliament, from 8–14 October to allow them to bring the current parliamentary session to an end and introduce a new Queen's Speech.
- 4 October
  - The government assures the highest civil court in Scotland that Boris Johnson will send a letter to the EU seeking an extension to Article 50 as required by the Benn Act.
  - Prince Harry begins legal action against the owners of The Sun and the Daily Mirror, in relation to alleged phone-hacking.
- 5 October
  - 2019 Totnes bus crash: More than fifty people are injured after a double-decker bus crashes and overturns on the A385 between Totnes and Paignton in Devon.
  - Foreign Secretary Dominic Raab says he has called the US ambassador to the United Kingdom to express his "disappointment" that a US diplomat's wife who is the subject of a police investigation following a fatal road crash has left the UK.
  - Lucia Lucas becomes the first transgender singer to perform with the English National Opera in London.
- 6 October
  - Essex Police confirm that a 32-year-old man has been arrested on suspicion of murder after three men were found dead at an address in Colchester the previous evening.
  - Flights repatriating the final 4,800 Thomas Cook holidaymakers stranded abroad following the company's collapse take off, bringing to an end Operation Matterhorn, the largest peacetime repatriation operation that has seen more than 150,000 people brought back to the UK.
- 8 October
  - A Downing Street source says that a Brexit deal is now "essentially impossible" after a phone call between the Prime Minister and German chancellor Angela Merkel. The Brexit spokesman for Angela Merkel's CDU parliamentary group says the unattributable remark "does not ring true".
  - Parliament is prorogued until 14 October.
- 9 October
  - The Government announces plans for a special Saturday sitting of Parliament for 19 October to discuss Brexit options.
  - Welsh Assembly AMs vote 43–13 to rename the legislature with a bilingual name, calling it both Senedd Cymru and the Welsh Parliament.
- 10 October – Boris Johnson and his Irish counterpart, Taoiseach Leo Varadkar hold talks at Thornton Manor in north west England aimed at reaching an agreement over Northern Ireland's status after Brexit.
- 11 October
  - The Arndale Centre in Manchester is evacuated after a number of stabbings, in which four people are injured. A man in his 40s is arrested on suspicion of planning an act of terrorism.
  - The pound has its biggest rally against the dollar since the Brexit vote, amid hopes that a deal could be reached before the deadline on 31 October.
- 13 October
  - Canonisation of John Henry Newman: Cardinal John Henry Newman (d. 1890) is canonised by Pope Francis in St. Peter's Square, Vatican City, in the presence of Prince Charles and representatives of the Anglican church, making Newman the first English person who has lived since the 17th century to be recognised officially as a saint by the Roman Catholic Church.
  - Convicted serial sex offender Richard Huckle is stabbed to death in his cell at HMP Full Sutton.
  - Following the test explosion in July, four of the remaining seven cooling towers are demolished at Ferrybridge C Power Station in West Yorkshire.
- 14 October
  - The Queen's Speech during Parliament's State Opening sets out 26 bills, including the plans for Brexit.
  - Extinction Rebellion protests are banned across London by the Metropolitan Police.
- 17 October – The UK and EU agree a new Brexit withdrawal agreement, but the DUP confirm they will not support its passage through Parliament.
- 18 October
  - Sainsbury's becomes the first major supermarket to stop selling fireworks at its 2,300 stores across the UK.
  - Churchwarden Ben Field is convicted at Oxford Crown Court of murdering author Peter Farquhar so as to inherit his estate. The court heard that Peter Farquhar was the victim of a sustained gaslighting plot before being killed in a manner staged by Field to look like an accident at his home in Maids Moreton, Buckinghamshire. Field is jailed for a minimum term of 36 years.
- 19 October
  - A special Saturday sitting of Parliament is held to debate the revised European Union withdrawal agreement. MPs pass an amendment 322 to 306 that withholds Parliament's approval until legislation implementing the deal has been passed, and forces the Government to request a delay to Brexit until 31 January 2020.
  - 10 Downing Street confirms that Boris Johnson will send a letter to the EU requesting an extension to Article 50, but will not sign it. EU Council President Donald Tusk subsequently confirms receipt of the letter; in addition, Johnson sends a second letter describing any further delay to Brexit as a mistake.
  - Another People's Vote march is held through London, matching the size of the previous one on 23 March 2019, in which hundreds of thousands attended.
- 21 October
  - Speaker of the House of Commons John Bercow refuses to allow a 'meaningful vote' on the latest Brexit deal, stating that "the motion will not be debated today as it would be repetitive and disorderly to do so."
  - Waitrose and John Lewis announce they are to stop selling Christmas crackers containing plastic toys from 2020, as part of plans to cut down on single-use plastic.
- 22 October
  - Abortion is decriminalised in Northern Ireland.
  - MPs allow the government's new withdrawal agreement bill to pass to the next stage of the parliamentary process, by 329 votes to 299; a majority of 30. However, the proposed timetable of three days is rejected by 322 votes to 308; a majority of 14.
- 23 October – Essex lorry deaths: The bodies of 38 Vietnamese adults and a teenager are found in a lorry container at Grays, Essex. A 25-year-old man from Northern Ireland is arrested on suspicion of murder.
- 28 October
  - Operation Brock, a plan to manage traffic congestion on the M20 in Kent, comes into force in preparation for a no-deal Brexit.
  - EU leaders agree in principle to move the deadline for a Brexit with an agreement from 31 October 2019 to 31 January 2020.
  - MPs reject a motion for a 12 December general election, with only 299 votes in favour, which is 135 votes short of the two-thirds majority needed. 70 MPs vote against the motion. Johnson says he will table a new bill after losing this motion.
- 29 October
  - Labour leader Jeremy Corbyn announces that he and his party will now support a general election.
  - MPs vote by 438 to 20 in favour of a general election, scheduled for Thursday 12 December 2019, by passing the Early Parliamentary General Election Bill.
- 30 October
  - An inquiry into the 2013 Glasgow helicopter crash finds that the pilot "took a chance" and ignored low fuel warnings.
  - Survivors and bereaved relatives of the Grenfell Tower fire call for London Fire Brigade chief Dany Cotton to resign, after a highly critical report from the inquiry into the blaze.
  - The last Prime Minister's Question Time before the general election is held.

=== November ===
- 1 November – Following a report from the Oil and Gas Authority, the government calls a halt to all fracking in the UK "with immediate effect" and warns shale gas companies that it will not support future projects.
- 3 November – Conservative MP Ross Thomson announces he will not stand at the next election following an accusation that he sexually assaulted Labour MP Paul Sweeney.
- 4 November
  - The UK terrorism threat level is reduced from "severe" to "substantial" for the first time since 2014.
  - Sir Lindsay Hoyle, Member of Parliament for Chorley, is elected Speaker of the House of Commons, replacing John Bercow who stepped down after 10 years in the role.
  - 18 female members of Parliament of the United Kingdom say they will not seek reelection due to threats and abuse.
- 5 November – Retailer Mothercare collapses into administration, putting 2,500 UK jobs at risk.
- 6 November
  - At 00:01, the 57th parliament is dissolved in preparation for the general election on 12 December 2019.
  - Extinction Rebellion wins a High Court challenge against the Metropolitan Police over a London-wide ban on protests that came into force on 14 October.
  - Alun Cairns resigns as Secretary of State for Wales over allegations that he was aware of the role of a former aide in the "sabotage" of a rape trial.
  - Labour's Tom Watson announces he will step down as an MP at the forthcoming election, and vacate his post as deputy leader of Labour for personal reasons.
- 7 November – The Times reports that Downing Street is suspected by unnamed sources of suppressing a parliamentary report into Russian interference because it contains "embarrassing" disclosures about the Kremlin links of wealthy Russian donors to the Conservative Party.
- 8 November – More than 100 flood warnings are issued across the Midlands and northern England, with some areas receiving a month's worth of rainfall in 24 hours. The torrential downpours, described as "almost biblical", led to the death of a former Derbyshire High Sheriff, Annie Hall.
- 16 November – Prince Andrew, Duke of York, in a TV interview with Emily Maitlis, denies having sex with Virginia Giuffre (now Virginia Giuffre) when she was a teenager, and expresses regret at having met convicted child sex offender Jeffrey Epstein in 2010. He is widely criticised for the interview.
- 19 November – Boris Johnson and Jeremy Corbyn appear on ITV in a head-to-head election debate. The Conservatives attract controversy in the Conservative Campaign Headquarters "factcheckUK" incident as CCHQ's press office alters the brand and imagery of their Twitter profile (@CCHQPress) during the live broadcast so it appears as "factcheckUK", and posts pro-Conservative responses attacking Corbyn. Conservative Party chairman James Cleverly defends it as "calling out when the Labour Party put what they know to be complete fabrications in the public domain". The Electional Commission calls on all campaigners to act "responsibly", fact-checking body Full Fact criticises this behaviour as "inappropriate and misleading" and a spokesperson from Twitter says that they would take "decisive corrective action" if there were "further attempts to mislead people".
- 20 November – Prince Andrew says he is stepping down from public duties for the foreseeable future after being engulfed in the Jeffrey Epstein scandal, which has become a "major disruption" to the Royal Family.
- 23 November – Five teenagers, including a 13-year-old girl, are arrested following a brawl at Vue Cinema in the Star City complex in Birmingham, before the screening of the rap crime drama film Blue Story. It is reported that the arrested were armed with machetes and the police had to draw tasers. Vue subsequently ban screenings of the film – amid much controversy – at all their 91 chains across UK and Ireland. Showcase Cinemas (UK) initially ban the film as well but later reverse this decision.
- 28 November – Former South Yorkshire police chief, David Duckenfield, is found not guilty of manslaughter in the Hillsborough disaster trial.
- 29 November
  - 2019 London Bridge stabbing: A mass stabbing at a London Bridge venue results in two victims killed and at least five people injured. The suspect, wearing a hoax explosive device, is shot by police and dies at the scene. The attack is considered terror-related.
  - The Daily Mail and General Trust buys the "i" newspaper and website from JPIMedia for £49.6 million.

=== December ===
- 7 December – Virgin Trains cease operations on the West Coast Main Line after running trains on the line since 9 March 1997. They are replaced the following day by Avanti West Coast.
- 12 December
  - In the general election, the Conservative Party, led by Prime Minister Boris Johnson, achieves a majority of 80 seats in the House of Commons, while the Labour Party, led by Jeremy Corbyn, suffers major losses resulting in their lowest proportion of seats since 1935. The Scottish National Party wins a landslide in Scotland, winning 48 of the 59 seats.
  - Former U.S. Vice President, 2020 Democratic presidential candidate (and future president) Joe Biden calls Boris Johnson a physical and emotional clone of current President Donald Trump, following the latter's general election victory.

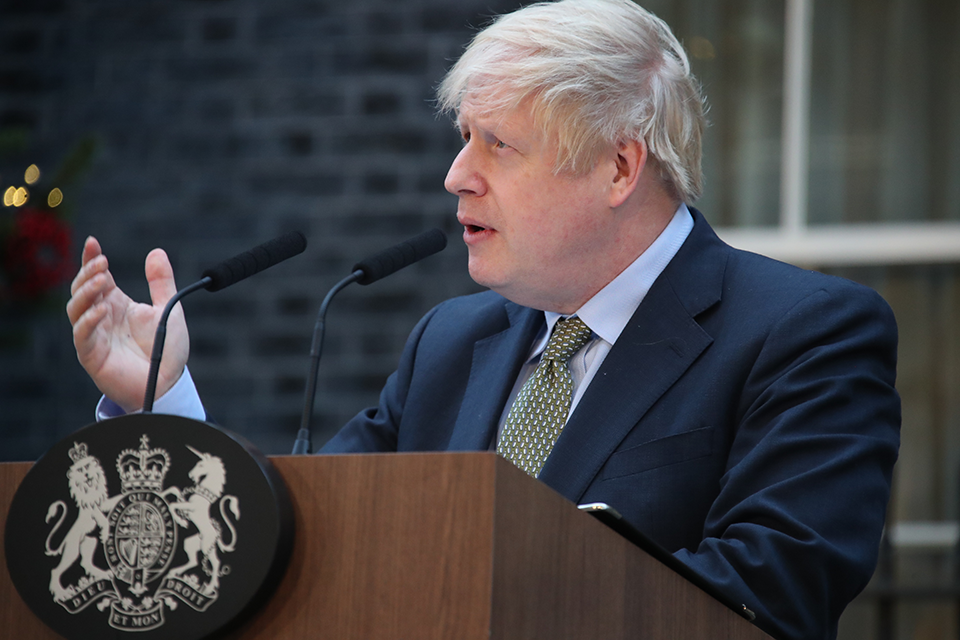
Boris Johnson following his victory at the general election

- 13 December
  - Jeremy Corbyn says he will not lead Labour into a future general election.
  - Jo Swinson resigns as Leader of the Liberal Democrats after losing her constituency seat to the Scottish National Party.
- 17 December – Boris Johnson announces that he plans to rule out (legally) any extension to the transition period after the UK leaves the EU.
- 19 December
  - The High Court rules that the Home Office's £1,012 child citizenship fee is unlawful.
  - Independent Group for Change is dissolved.
- 20 December
  - MPs vote in favour of the Brexit withdrawal agreement by 358 to 234, paving the way for the UK's exit from the EU on 31 January 2020.
  - Andrew Bailey is appointed as Governor of the Bank of England, effective from February 2020.
- 22 December – Tesco halts production of Christmas cards made in China after a girl in south London finds a card with a hand-written note asking for help. The writer claims to be a foreign prisoner being forced to work.
- 26 December – The RSPCA begins an investigation after a prominent lawyer, Jolyon Maugham, says that he killed an urban fox with a baseball bat.
- 28 December – The Cabinet Office apologises after the addresses of more than 1,000 2020 New Year Honours recipients, including senior police and political figures, are accidentally published online.
- 31 December – The first opposite-sex couples are granted civil partnerships in England and Wales by amended legislation under the Civil Partnerships, Marriages and Deaths (Registration etc.) Act of 26 March.

== Publications ==
- Simon Beckett's detective novel The Scent of Death.
- Lindsey Davis's historical detective novel A Capitol Death.
- Bernardine Evaristo's Booker Prize-winning novel Girl, Woman, Other.
- Luke Jennings's thriller Killing Eve: No Tomorrow.
- John le Carré's espionage novel Agent Running in the Field.
- Ian McDonald's science fiction novel Luna: Moon Rising.

== Births ==
- 6 May – Prince Archie of Sussex.

== Deaths ==
=== January ===
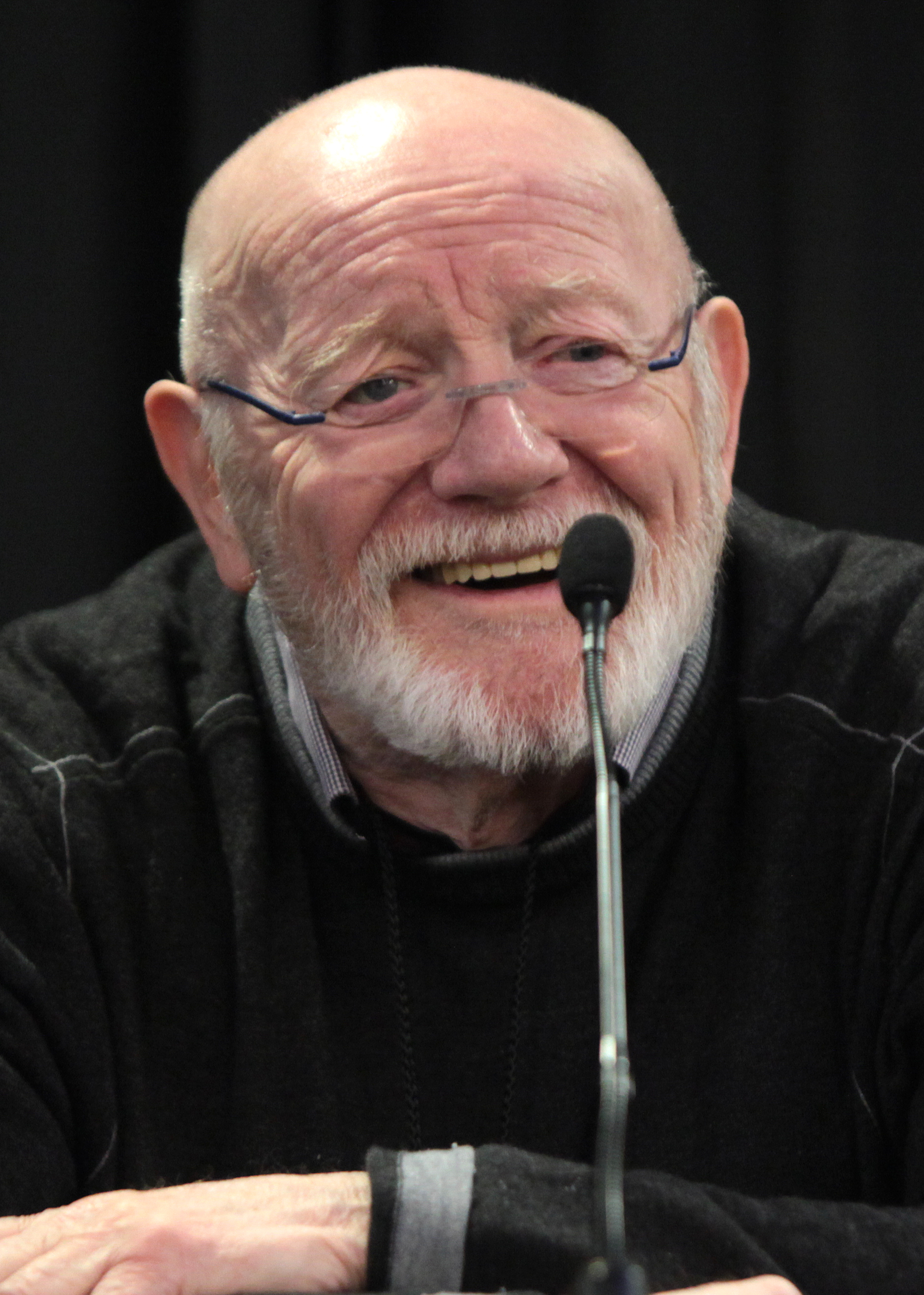
William Morgan Sheppard in 2015

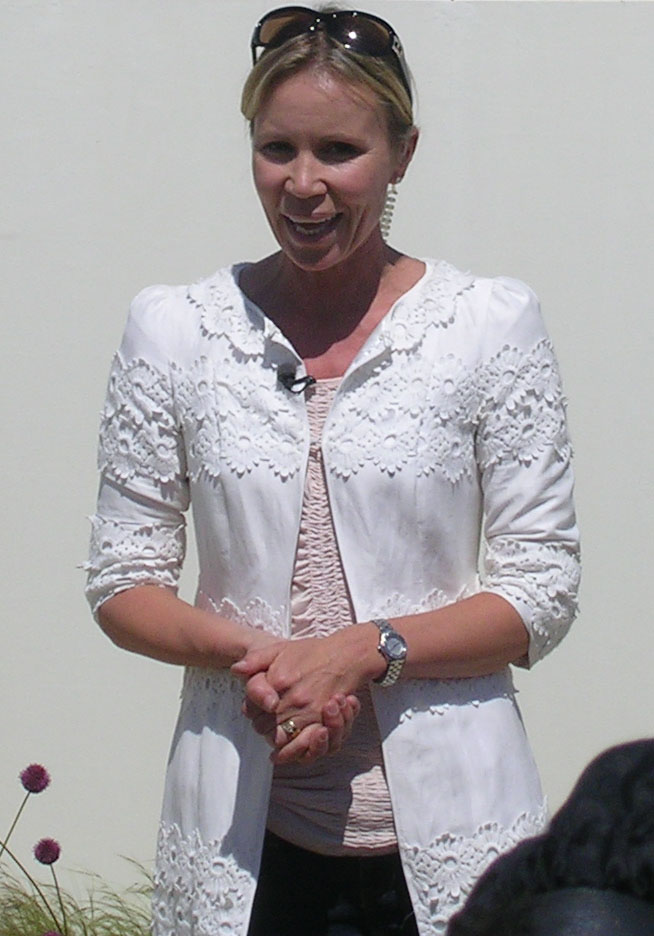
Dianne Oxberry in 2010

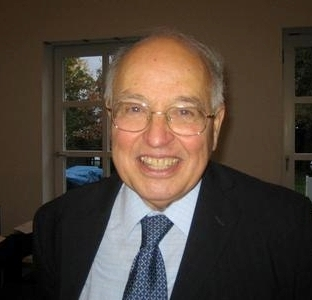
Sir Michael Atiyah in 2007

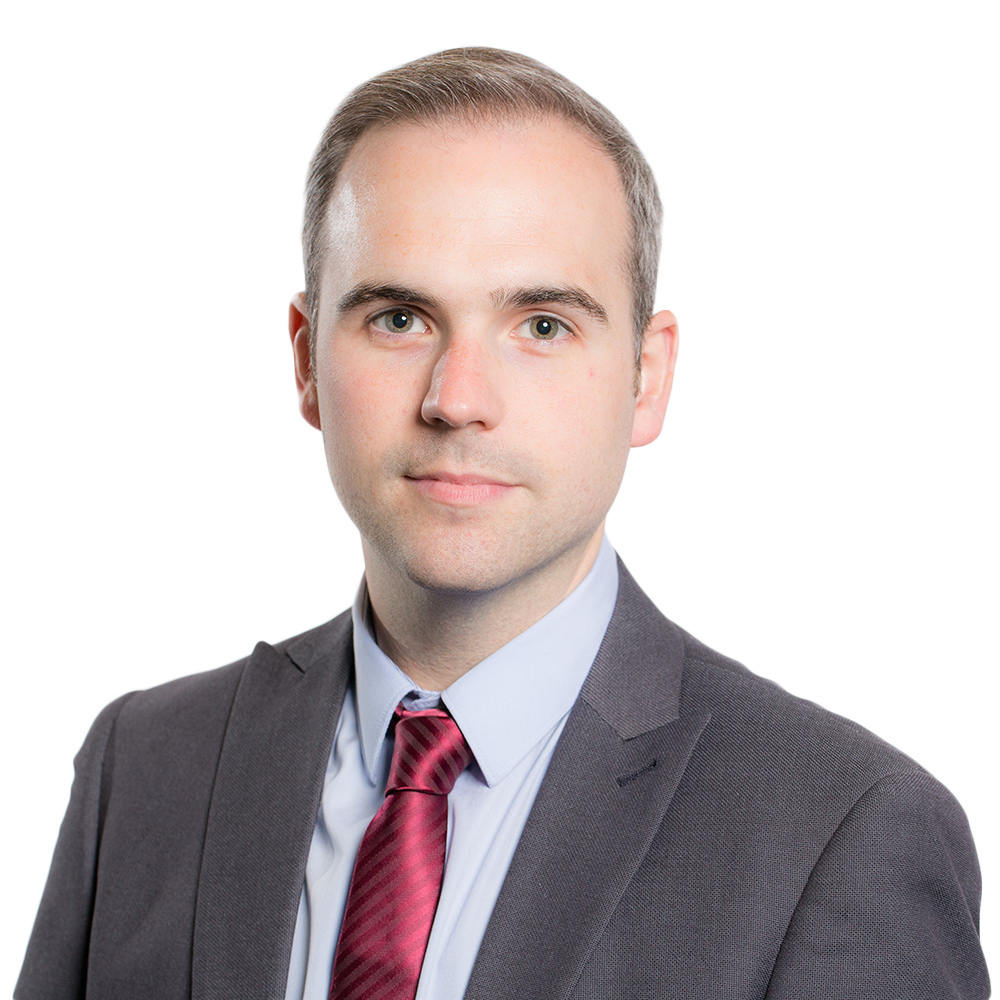
Steffan Lewis in 2016

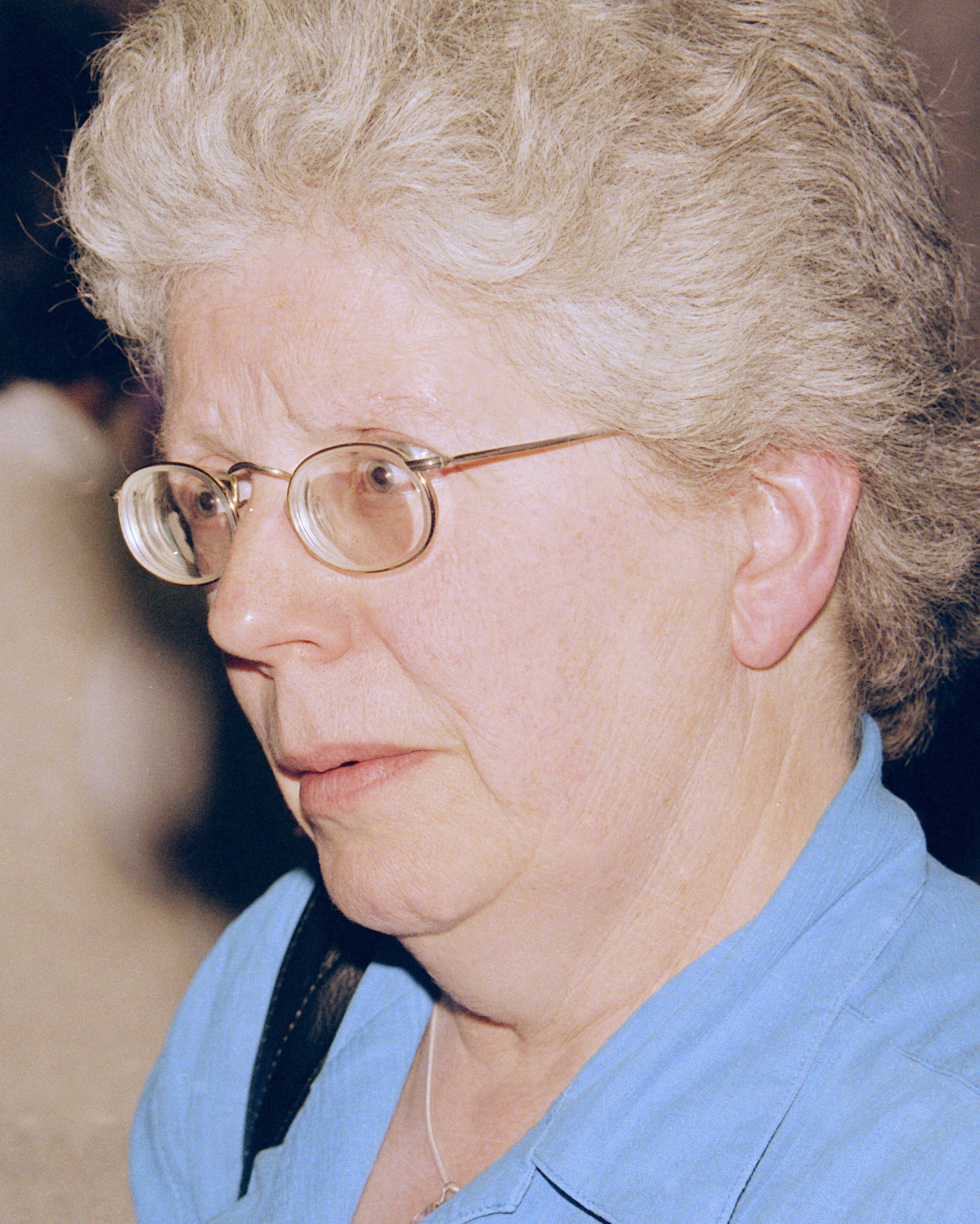
Sue Povey in 2001

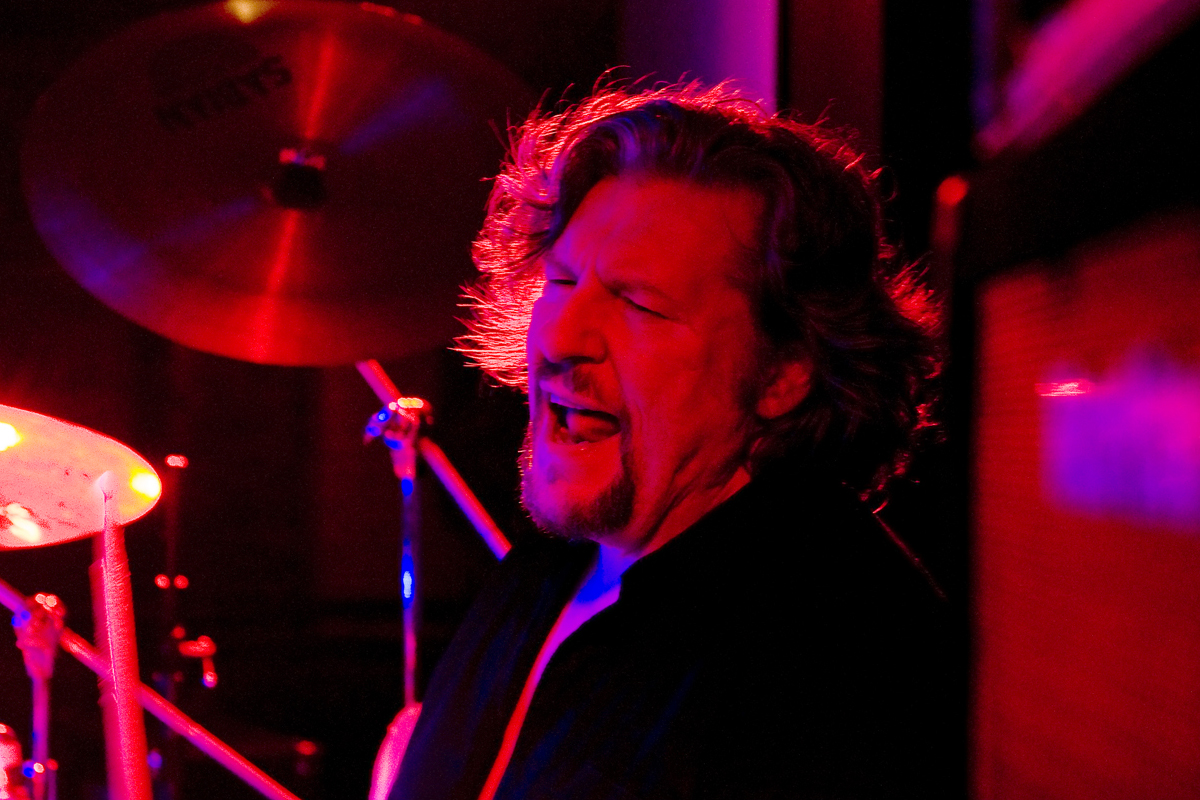
Ted McKenna in 2009

- 1 January
  - Katie Flynn, 82, British novelist.
  - Dean Ford, 72, Scottish singer and songwriter Marmalade
  - Freddie Glidden, 91, Scottish footballer (Hearts, Dumbarton).
- 2 January
  - Bill Elsey, 97, British racehorse trainer (Epsom Oaks, St Leger Stakes).
  - Julia Grant, 64, British trans woman pioneer (A Change of Sex).
  - Geoffrey Langlands, 101, army officer and educator.
- 3 January
  - Joe Casely-Hayford, 62, British fashion designer.
  - Jack Fennell, 85, English rugby league footballer (Featherstone Rovers).
  - Reg Holland, 78, English footballer (Wrexham, Chester City, Altrincham).
- 4 January
  - John Burningham, 82, English author and illustrator, pneumonia.
  - David Garman, 92, inventor and businessman.
  - Frank Mugglestone, 94, English rugby league footballer (Bradford Northern, Castleford).
- 5 January
  - Derek Foster, Baron Foster of Bishop Auckland, 81, politician, MP for Bishop Auckland (1979–2005) and member of the House of Lords (since 2005), cancer.
  - Don Grierson, 77, music industry executive.
  - Eric Haydock, 75, British bassist (The Hollies).
  - Aisha Lemu, 79, British-born Nigerian Islamic scholar.
- 6 January
  - Derek Piggott, 96, British glider pilot and flight instructor.
  - Ken Preston, 93, English cricketer (Essex).
  - William Morgan Sheppard, 86, actor.
  - Paul Streeten, 101, Austrian-born British economics professor
- 7 January
  - Laurie Gilfedder, 83, English rugby league footballer (Great Britain, Lancashire, Warrington, Wigan, Leigh).
  - John Joubert, 91, South African-born British composer.
  - Dave Laing, 71, English writer, editor and broadcaster, cancer.
  - Ronald C. Read, 94, British-born Canadian mathematician.
- 8 January – John Nye, 95, glaciologist, heart failure.
- 9 January – Ian Adamson, 74, Northern Irish politician, Lord Mayor of Belfast (1996–1997), MLA (1998–2003).
- 10 January
  - Martin Gore, 67, oncologist, complications following yellow fever vaccination.
  - Barbara Low, 98, British-American biochemist.
  - Dianne Oxberry, 51, English broadcaster and weather presenter for the BBC regional news programme BBC North West Tonight.
  - Lionel Price, 91, Olympic basketball player (1948).
  - Ron Smith, 94, British comic artist (Judge Dredd).
  - Sir Conrad Swan, 94, Canadian-born British officer of arms.
- 11 January
  - Sir Michael Atiyah, 89, British mathematician, President of the Royal Society (1990–1995).
  - David Hinkley, 74–75, British-born American statistician.
  - Steffan Lewis, 34, Welsh politician, AM (since 2016).
  - Andrew MacLachlan, 77, Scottish actor (Monty Python's Life of Brian, A Fish Called Wanda, By the Sword Divided).
  - Sue Povey, 76, geneticist.
- 12 January
  - Linda Kelly, 82, English historian.
  - John Slim, 2nd Viscount Slim, 91, peer and Member of the House of Lords (since 1971).
- 13 January – Serena Rothschild, 83, Thoroughbred horse owner.
- 14 January
  - Martha Ross, 79, English actress (EastEnders, Grange Hill) and radio presenter.
  - Duncan Welbourne, 78, English footballer (Watford).
- 17 January
  - Windsor Davies, 88, Welsh actor.
  - Garfield Owen, 86, Welsh rugby player (Halifax, Keighley, Newport). (death announced on this date)
- 18 January
  - Sylvia Kay, 82, English actress (Rapture, Wake in Fright, Just Good Friends)
  - Brian Stowell, 82, Manx reporter (Max Radio), linguist, physicist and author, Reih Bleeaney Vanannan winner (2008).
- 19 January
  - Ted McKenna, 68, Scottish drummer (The Sensational Alex Harvey Band).
  - Muriel Pavlow, 97, English actress, (Malta Story, Doctor in the House, Reach for the Sky)
- 22 January – Andrew Fairlie, 55, Scottish chef.
- 23 January – Diana Athill, 101, British literary editor and novelist.
- 24 January – Hugh McIlvanney, 84, Scottish sports writer (The Sunday Times).
- 25 January – Nigel Saddington, 53, English footballer (Doncaster Rovers, Carlisle United, Gateshead).
- 27 January
  - Sir Reginald Eyre, 94, British politician, MP for Birmingham Hall Green (1965–1987).
  - Mike Harrison, 78, English footballer (Chelsea, Blackburn Rovers, Luton Town).
- 28 January – Noel Rawsthorne, 89, British organist and composer.
- 29 January – Martha Ross, 80, British actress (EastEnders, Grange Hill) and radio presenter.
- 30 January
  - Stewart Adams, 95, British chemist, developed ibuprofen.
  - Dame Felicity Hill, 103, British Royal Air Force officer.
  - Bernard Nevill, 88, English textile designer.
  - Duncan Weldon, 77, English theatre producer.
- 31 January – Dennis Hunt, 81, English football player (Gillingham, Brentford) and manager (Ashford Town).

=== February ===
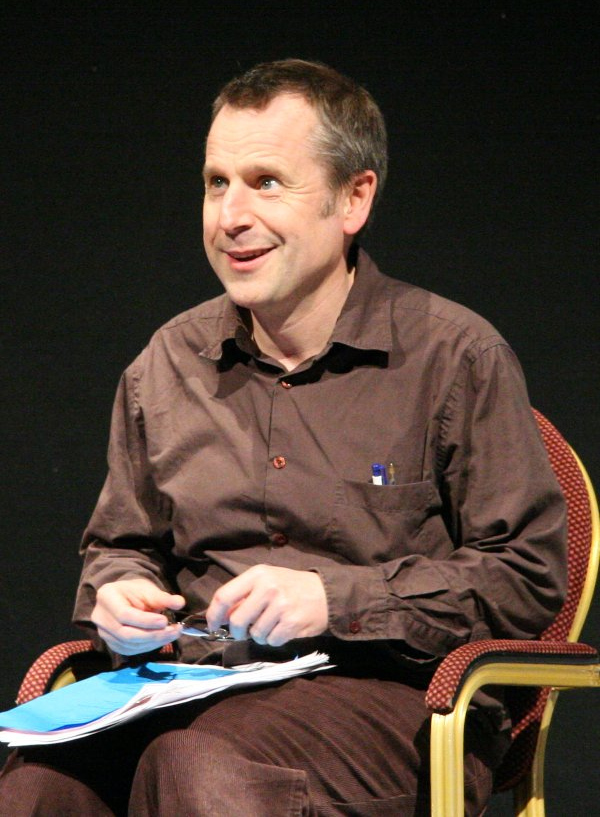
Jeremy Hardy in 2006

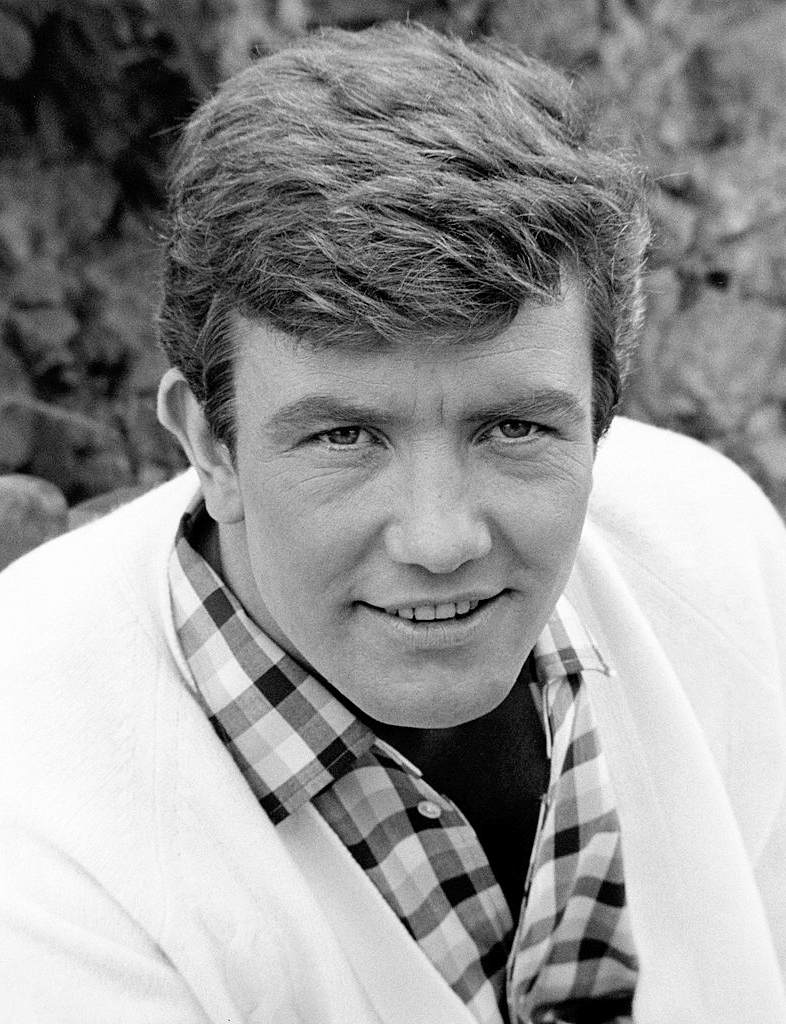
Albert Finney in 1966

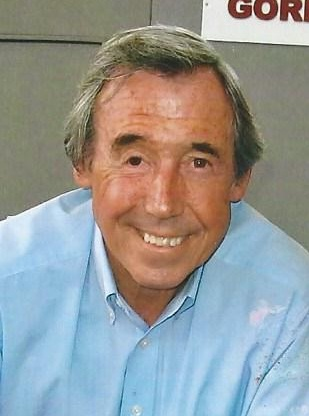
Gordon Banks in 2007

- 1 February
  - Conway Berners-Lee, 97, English mathematician and computer scientist.
  - Tim Elkington, 98, British Royal Air Force fighter pilot, member of The Few.
  - Jeremy Hardy, 57, English comedian (The News Quiz, I'm Sorry I Haven't a Clue, Jeremy Hardy Speaks to the Nation), cancer.
  - Clive Swift, 82, English actor (The National Health, Keeping Up Appearances, The Old Guys) and songwriter.
  - Les Thornton, 84, British professional wrestler (Stampede, NWA, WWF).
- 2 February – William Davis, 85, German-born British journalist (BBC).
- 3 February
  - Richard Lacey, 78, microbiologist.
  - Danny Williams, 94, English football player (Rotherham United) and manager (Swindon Town, Sheffield Wednesday).
- 4 February
  - Colin Barker, 79, British sociologist and historian.
  - Matt Brazier, 42, English footballer (QPR, Cardiff City, Leyton Orient).
  - Ward Thomas, 95, British television executive and World War II fighter pilot.
- 5 February
  - Joe Fascione, 74, Scottish footballer (Chelsea, Dundee United).
  - Peter Hughes, 96, English actor (The Great Muppet Caper, Hope and Glory, Evita), pneumonia.
  - Andy Nisbet, 65, Scottish climber, fall.
  - Edward H. Simpson, 96, code breaker, statistician and civil servant.
- 6 February
  - Edwin Barnes, 84, British Roman Catholic priest.
  - Gerald English, 93, British tenor.
  - Marcia Falkender, Baroness Falkender, 86, British politician.
  - Michael Green, 88, British theologian.
  - Vikki Orvice, 56, British sports journalist.
  - Rosamunde Pilcher, 94, British author (The Shell Seekers).
  - Mags Portman, 44, doctor, advocate for PrEP in fight against HIV, mesothelioma.
- 7 February – Albert Finney, 82, English actor (Tom Jones, Erin Brockovich, Murder on the Orient Express, Big Fish, Skyfall).
- 8 February
  - John Haynes, 80, British publisher (Haynes Publishing Group).
  - Jim Miller, 76, Scottish linguist.
  - Cliff Myers, 72, English footballer (Charlton Athletic, Yeovil Town, Torquay United).
- 9 February
  - Cadet, 28, British rap artist.
  - Katharina Lindner, 39, German-born Scottish footballer (Glasgow City).
  - Fred Pickering, 78, English footballer (Blackburn Rovers, Everton, national team).
  - Ian Ross, 72, English footballer (Liverpool, Aston Villa, Peterborough United).
- 10 February
  - Terry Dempsey, 77, English-born South African songwriter, struck by gyrocopter.
  - Eric Dunning, 82, sociologist.
  - Sam McCready, 82, Northern Irish actor, playwright and theatre director.
  - Roderick MacFarquhar, 88, British politician, journalist and historian.
- 12 February
  - Gordon Banks, 81, English footballer (Leicester City, Stoke City, national team), world champion (1966).
  - Austin Rhodes, 81, English rugby league football player (St Helens, Leigh) and coach (Swinton).
  - David Walton, 73, British ecologist.
- 13 February
  - Dick Churchill, 99, British RAF squadron leader, last survivor of the Great Escape.
  - Eric Harrison, 81, English football player (Halifax Town) and coach (Manchester United).
- 14 February
  - Andrea Levy, 62, English novelist (Small Island, The Long Song).
  - Simon P. Norton, 66, English mathematician.
  - Alfred Radley, 94, fashion designer.
- 15 February
  - Charles Farr, 59, British civil servant, Chair of Joint Intelligence Committee (since 2015).
  - John Stalker, 79, police officer, Deputy Chief Constable of Greater Manchester Police (1984–1987).
- 17 February
  - Paul Flynn, 84, British politician, MP for Newport West (since 1987).
  - Johnny Valentine, 88, Scottish footballer (Queen's Park, Rangers, St Johnstone).
- 20 February
  - Alan R. King, 64, British linguist.
  - Bruno Schroder, 86, British banker (Schroders).
- 21 February – Edward Enfield, 89, British television and radio presenter, and newspaper journalist.
- 23 February
  - Roger Ainsworth, 67, British engineer.
  - Gillian Freeman, 89, British author (The Undergrowth of Literature) and screenwriter (The Leather Boys, That Cold Day in the Park).
- 24 February – Patricia Garwood, 78, British actress (The Lavender Hill Mob, Petticoat Pirates, No Place Like Home).
- 25 February
  - Mark Hollis, 64, English singer-songwriter (Talk Talk).
  - Kenneth Pitt, 96, British publicist and talent manager (David Bowie).
- 26 February
  - Andy Anderson, 68, English drummer (The Cure, The Glove, Steve Hillage).
  - Bobby Doyle, 65, Scottish footballer (Peterborough United, Portsmouth).
  - Peter Fox, 85, English rugby league player (Batley Bulldogs) and coach (Featherstone Rovers, Bradford Northern).
  - Tony Honoré, 96, British lawyer and jurist.
- 27 February – Doug Sandom, 89, English drummer (The Who).
- 28 February – Peter Dolby, 78, English footballer (Shrewsbury Town).

=== March ===
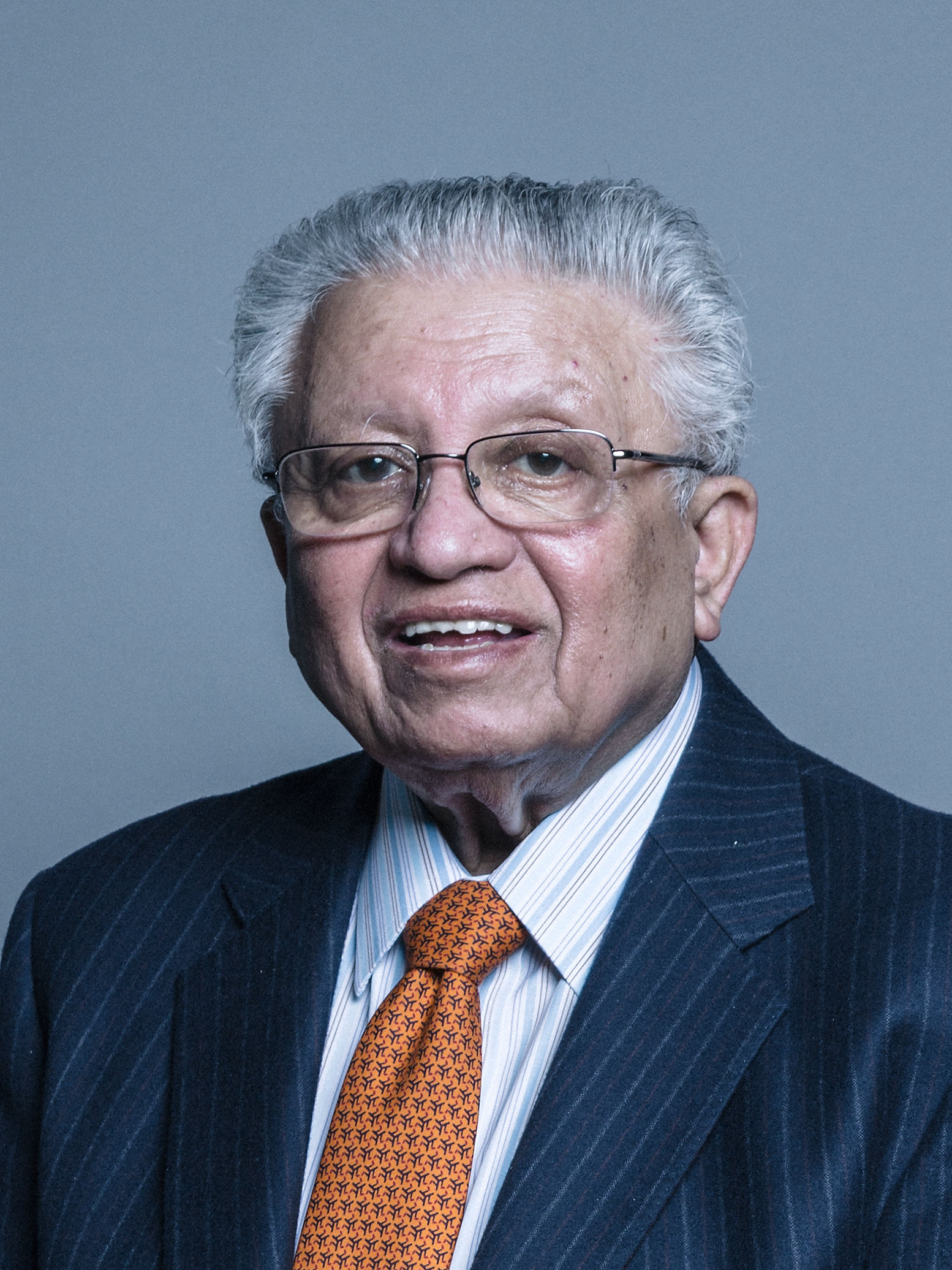
Kumar Bhattacharyya

Keith Flint in 2009

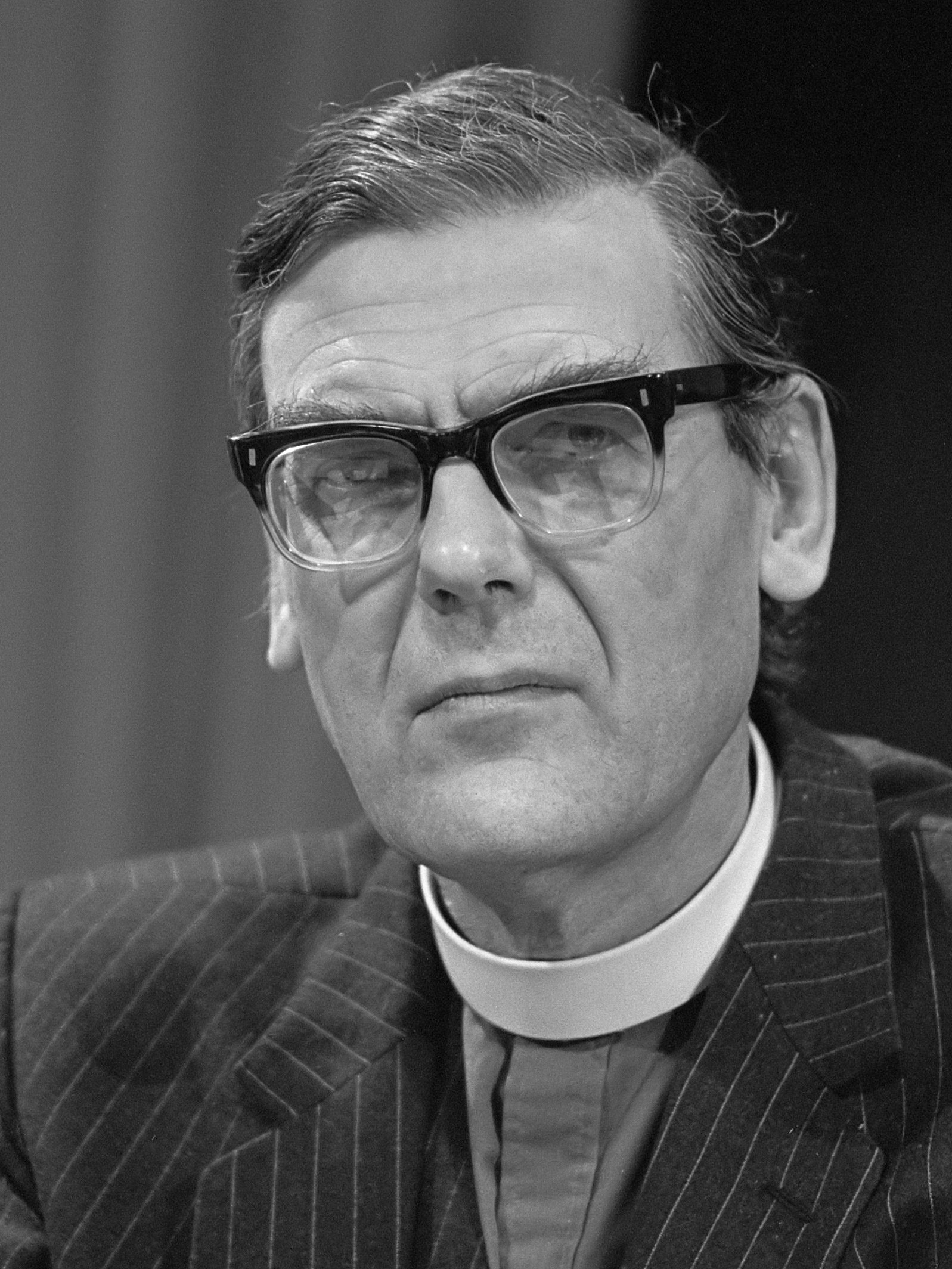
John Habgood in 1981

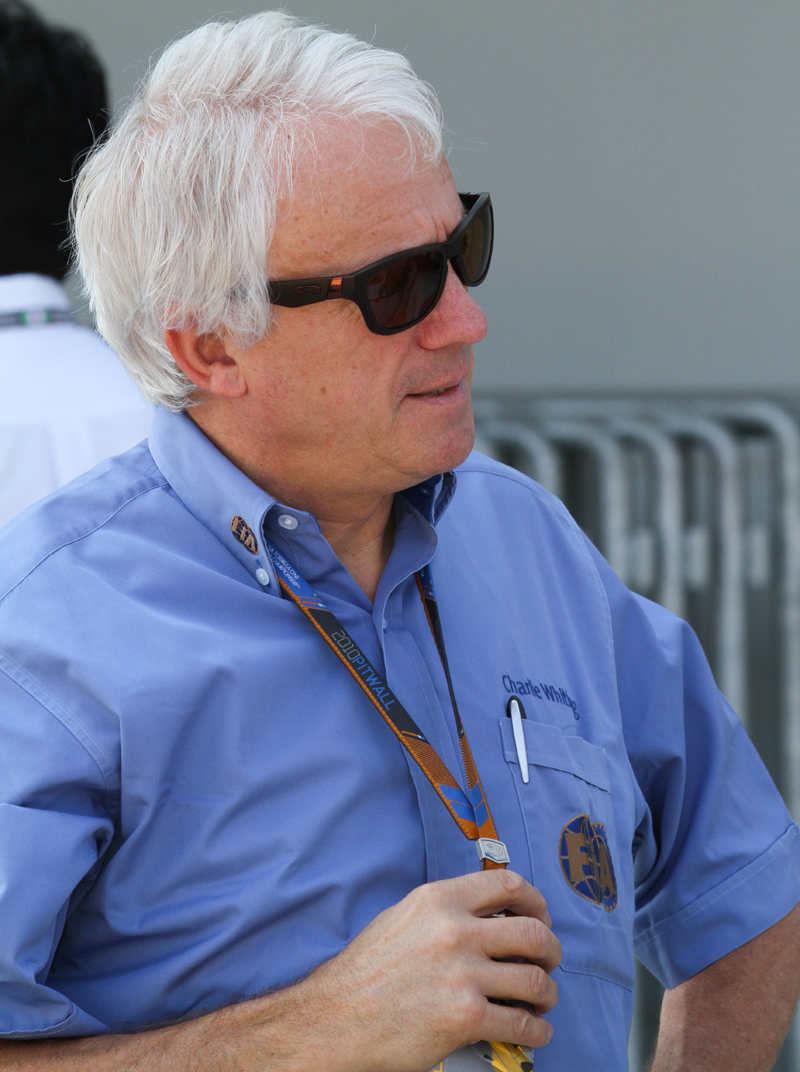
Charlie Whiting in 2010

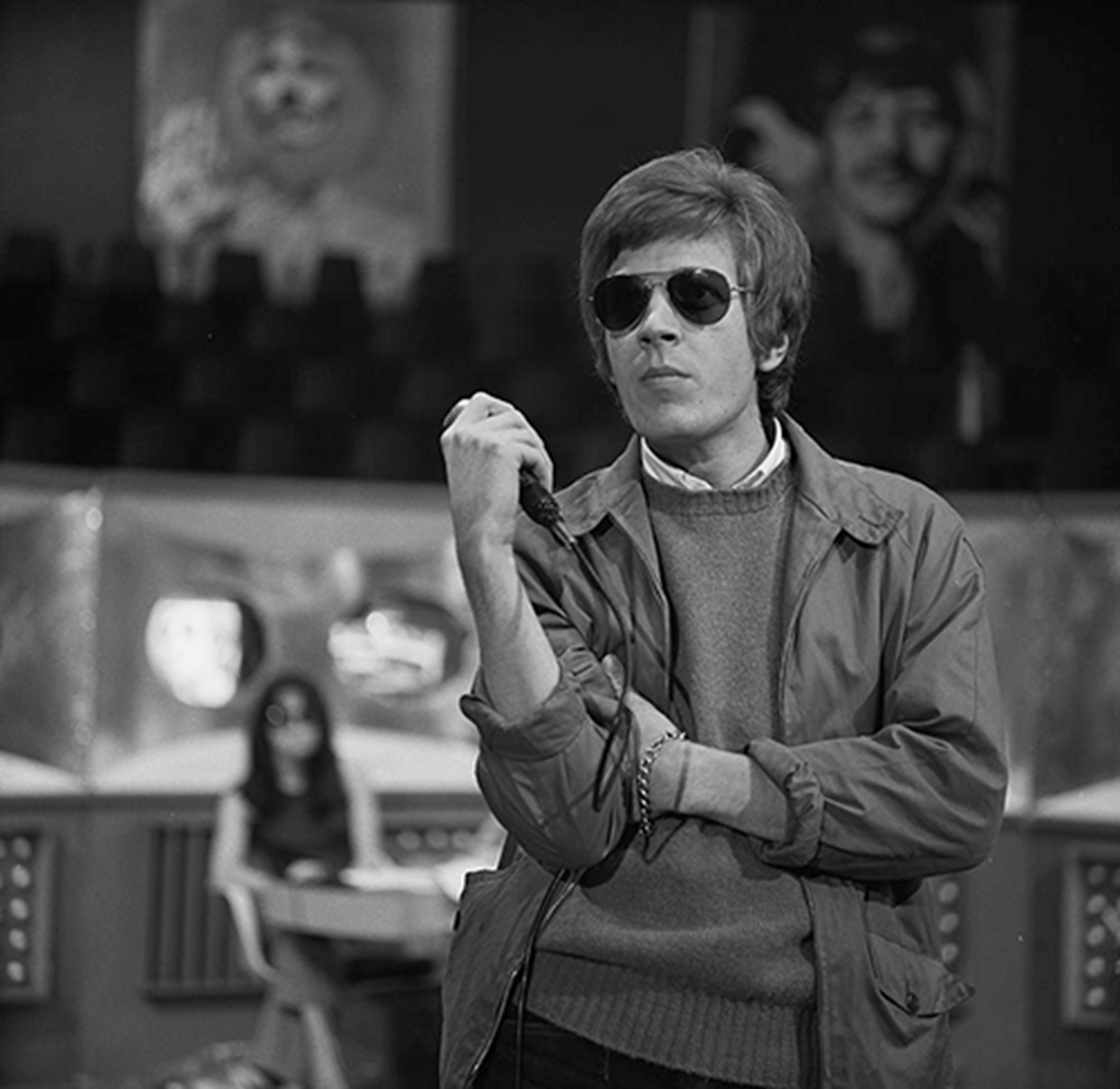
Scott Walker in 1968

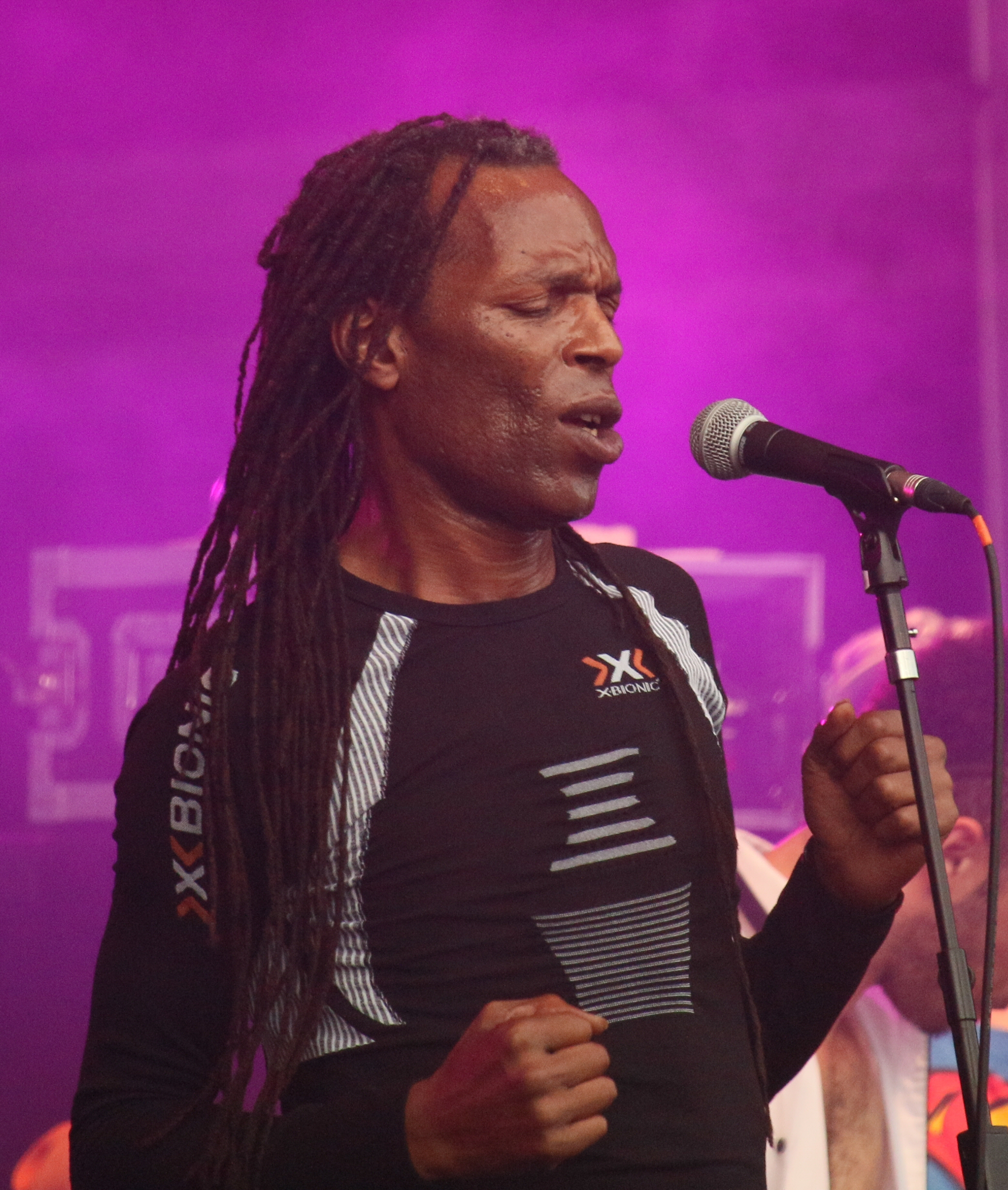
Ranking Roger in 2015

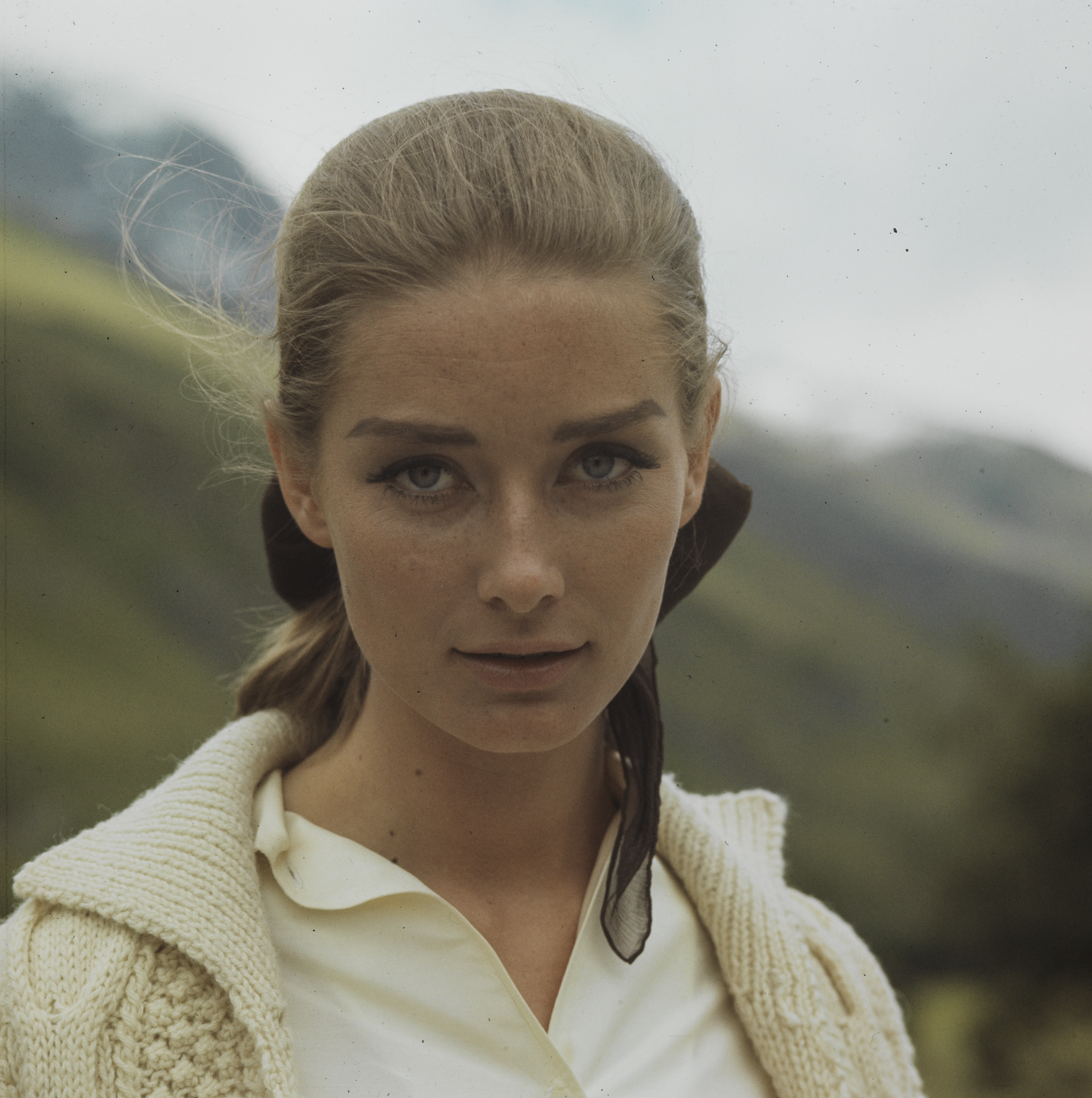
Tania Mallet in 1964

- 1 March
  - Kumar Bhattacharyya, Baron Bhattacharyya, 78, British-Indian engineer, educator and government advisor, member of the House of Lords (since 2004).
  - Paul Williams, 78, English singer (Zoot Money's Big Roll Band, Juicy Lucy, Allan Holdsworth).
- 2 March
  - David Held, 68, British political scientist.
  - Mike Oliver, 74, British disability rights activist.
- 3 March
  - John Bloom, 87, English entrepreneur (Rolls Razor).
  - Ben Hamilton-Baillie, 63, architect, cancer.
  - Peter Hurford, 88, British organist and composer.
- 4 March
  - Eric Caldow, 84, Scottish footballer (Rangers, national team).
  - Garfield Davies, Baron Davies of Coity, 83, British trade unionist (USDAW) and life peer.
  - Keith Flint, 49, English singer, musician and dancer (The Prodigy).
  - Michael Thomas, 66, actor (Life Without George, The Boat That Rocked, Head over Heels, myeloma.
- 5 March – David Kear, 95, British-born New Zealand geologist and science administrator, director-general of the Department of Scientific and Industrial Research (1980–1983).
- 6 March
  - Grayston Burgess, 86, English countertenor and conductor
  - Sir Simon Cassels, 91, British admiral, Second Sea Lord (1982–1986).
  - Magenta Devine, 61, British television presenter (Rough Guide, Network 7).
  - Mike Grose, British bassist (Queen).
  - John Habgood, 91, British Anglican bishop, academic, and life peer, Bishop of Durham (1973–1983), Archbishop of York (1983–1995).
- 7 March
  - Robert Braithwaite, 75, British marine engineer and entrepreneur, founder of Sunseeker.
  - Johnny Brittain, 86–87, British motorcycle racer.
- 8 March
  - David Martin, 89, sociologist and Anglican priest.
  - Jason Reese, 51, engineer.
  - Mike Watterson, 76, English snooker player, promoter and commentator.
- 9 March – Tom Ballard, 30, British rock climber. (body discovered on this date)
- 10 March
  - Gordon McIntosh, 93, Scottish-born Australian politician, Senator (1974–1987).
  - Angus Sinclair, 73, Scottish serial killer.
- 11 March – Danny Kustow, 69, English rock guitarist (Tom Robinson Band).
- 12 March
  - Alan Moss, 88, English cricketer (Middlesex, MCC, national team).
  - John Richardson, 95, British art historian, biographer of Picasso.
- 13 March
  - Keith Butler, 80, British racing cyclist.
  - Edmund Capon, 78, British-Australian art historian.
- 14 March
  - John Hellawell, 75, English footballer (Bradford City).
  - Paul Hutchins, 73, British tennis player.
  - Sir Stanley Peart, 96, doctor and medical researcher.
  - Charlie Whiting, 66, British motorsports director, FIA Formula 1 race director (since 1997).
- 15 March
  - Derek Burke, 89, academic.
  - Alec Coppen, 96, psychiatrist.
  - Derek Lewin, 88, English footballer (Bishop Auckland, Great Britain Olympic football team).
  - Ron Peplow, 83, English footballer (Brentford).
  - Mike Thalassitis, 26, British footballer (Stevenage) and reality television star (Love Island, Celebs Go Dating), suicide.
- 17 March – Mick Murphy, 77, English rugby player (St. Helens, Leigh).
- 18 March – Roy McDowell, 71, Scottish footballer (Berwick Rangers). (death announced on this date)
- 19 March
  - Derek Anthony, 71, military officer, Flag Officer Scotland, Northern England and Northern Ireland (2000–2003).
  - Graham Arnold, 86, English artist.
  - Tony Greenfield, 87, statistician.
  - Clinton Greyn, 85, Welsh-born actor (Compact, Goodbye, Mr. Chips, Doctor Who)
  - Rose Hilton, 87, British painter.
  - Fraser Robertson, 47, Scottish sports journalist (Sky Sports, STV).
  - Mary Warnock, Baroness Warnock, 94, British philosopher.
- 21 March – Gordon Hill, 90, English football referee.
- 22 March – Scott Walker, 76, American-born British singer-songwriter (The Walker Brothers), composer and record producer.
- 23 March – Victor Hochhauser, 95, Slovak-born British music promoter.
- 24 March
  - James Barclay, 86, Scottish playwright and novelist, lung cancer.
  - Julia Lockwood, 77, British actress (My Teenage Daughter, Please Turn Over, No Kidding)
  - Brian MacArthur, 79, newspaper editor and writer, leukaemia.
- 25 March
  - Edna Barker, 82, English cricketer.
  - Barrie Hole, 76, Welsh footballer (Cardiff City, Aston Villa, national team).
- 26 March
  - Ted Burgin, 91, British football player (Sheffield United, Leeds United, Rochdale) and manager.
  - Ranking Roger, 56, British singer (The Beat, General Public), cancer.
- 28 March – Kevin Randall, 73, English footballer and manager (Chesterfield, York City).
- 29 March – Shane Rimmer, 89, Canadian-born British actor (Thunderbirds, Dr. Strangelove, The Spy Who Loved Me), cancer.
- 30 March
  - Tania Mallet, 77, English model and actress (Goldfinger).
  - Jim Russell, 98, English racing driver.

=== April ===
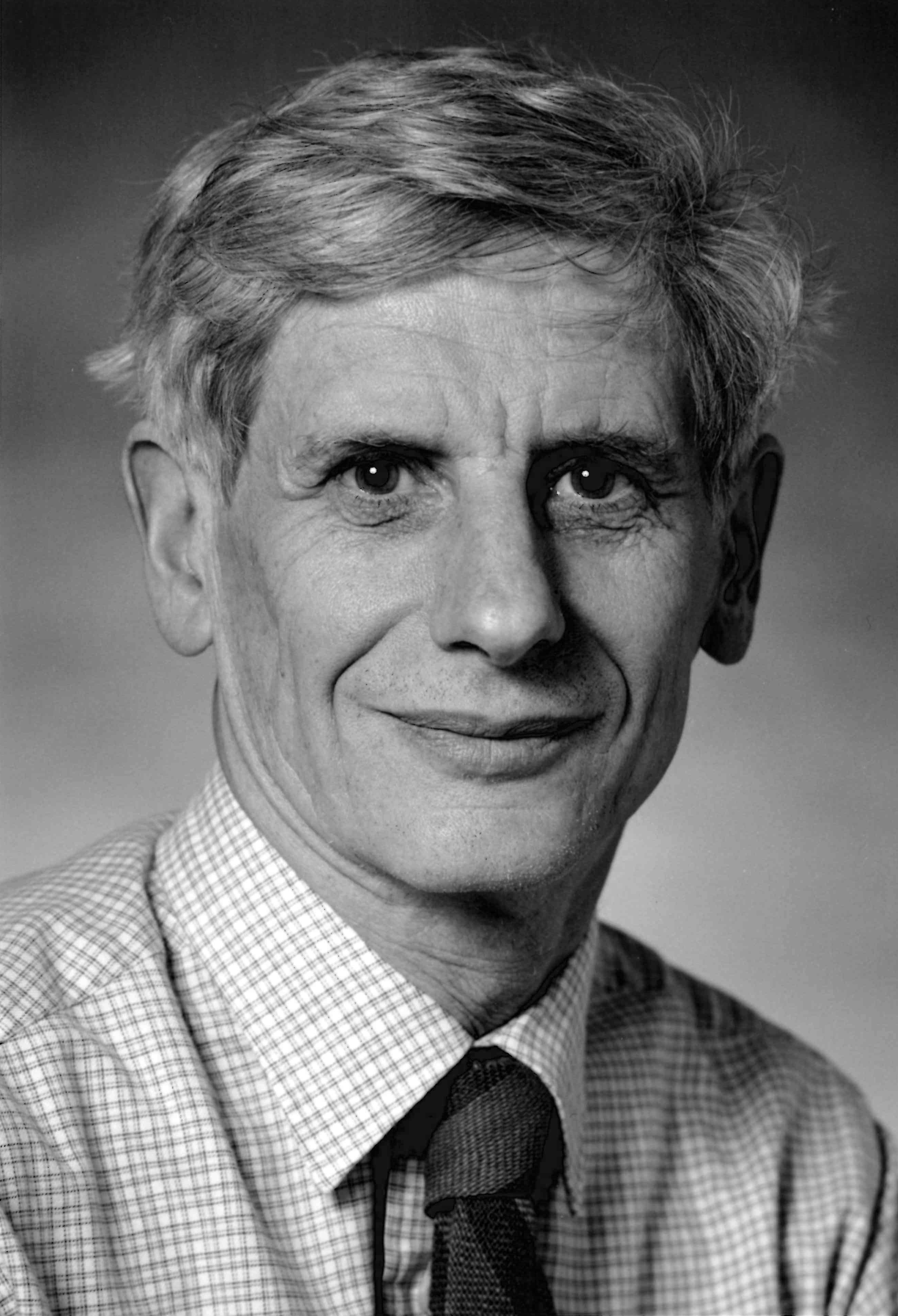
David J. Thouless in 1995

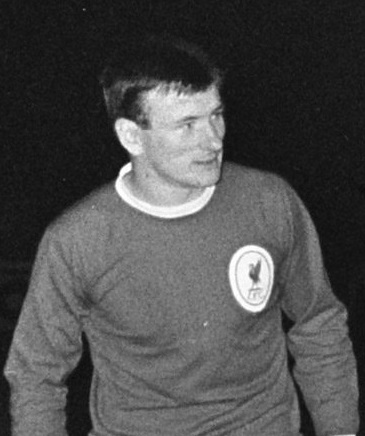
Tommy Smith in 1966

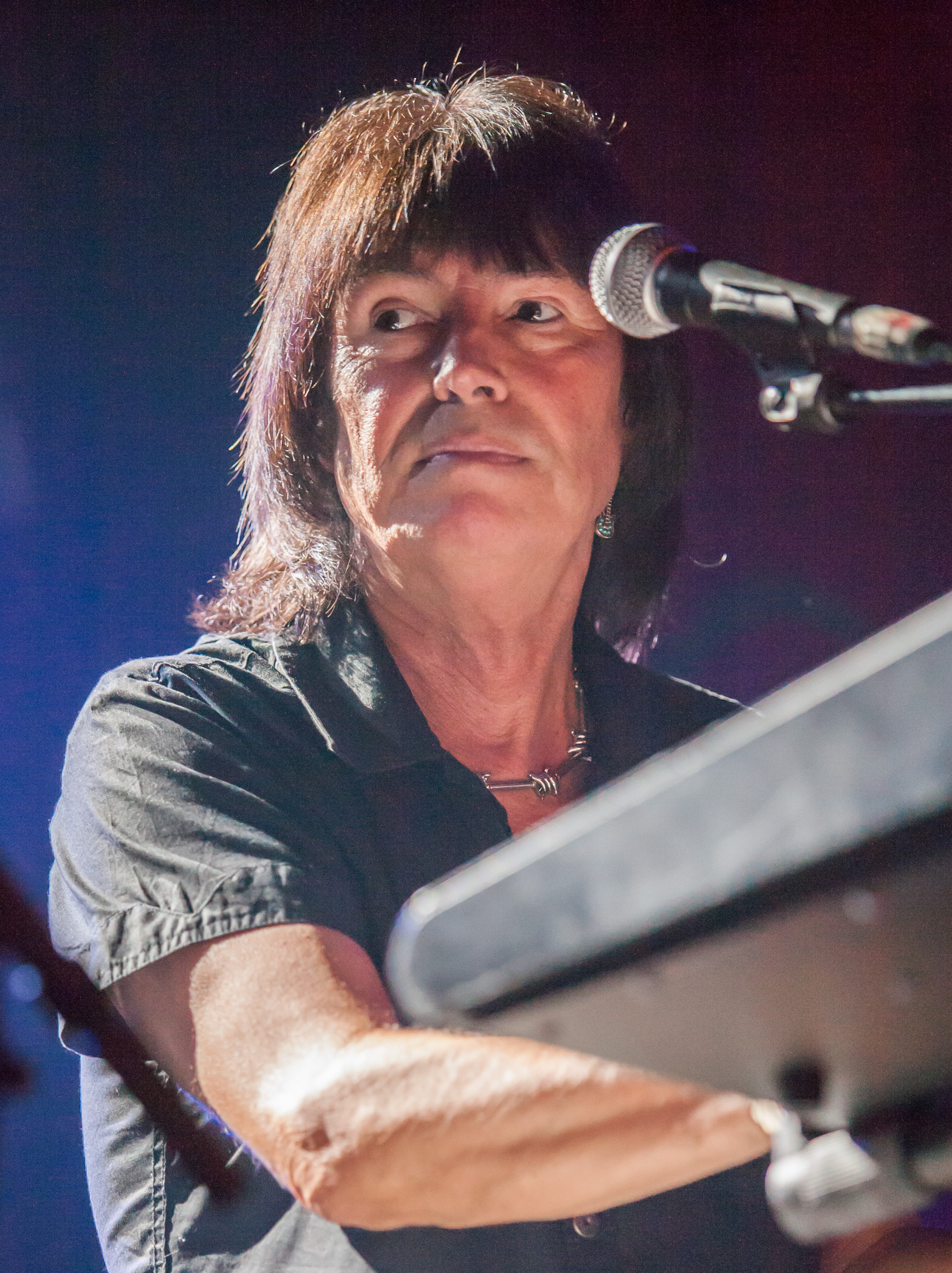
Paul Raymond in 2007

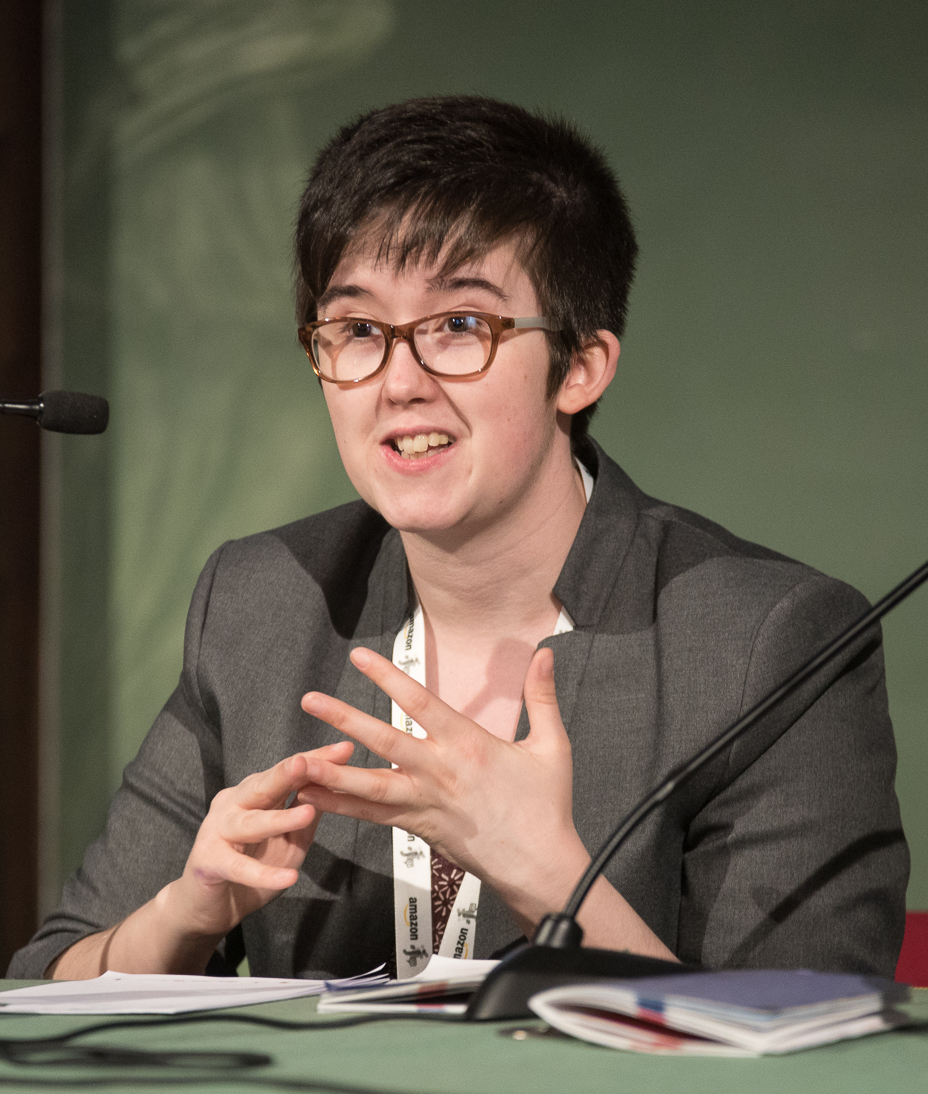
Lyra McKee in 2017

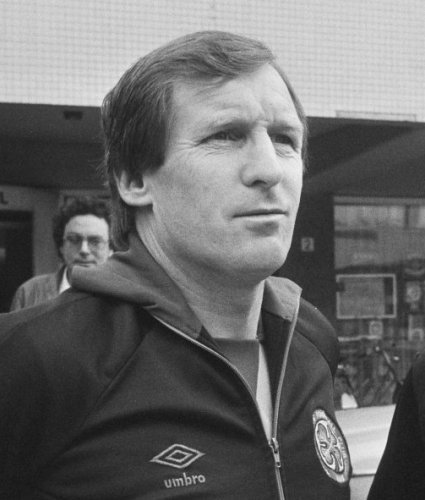
Billy McNeill in 1982

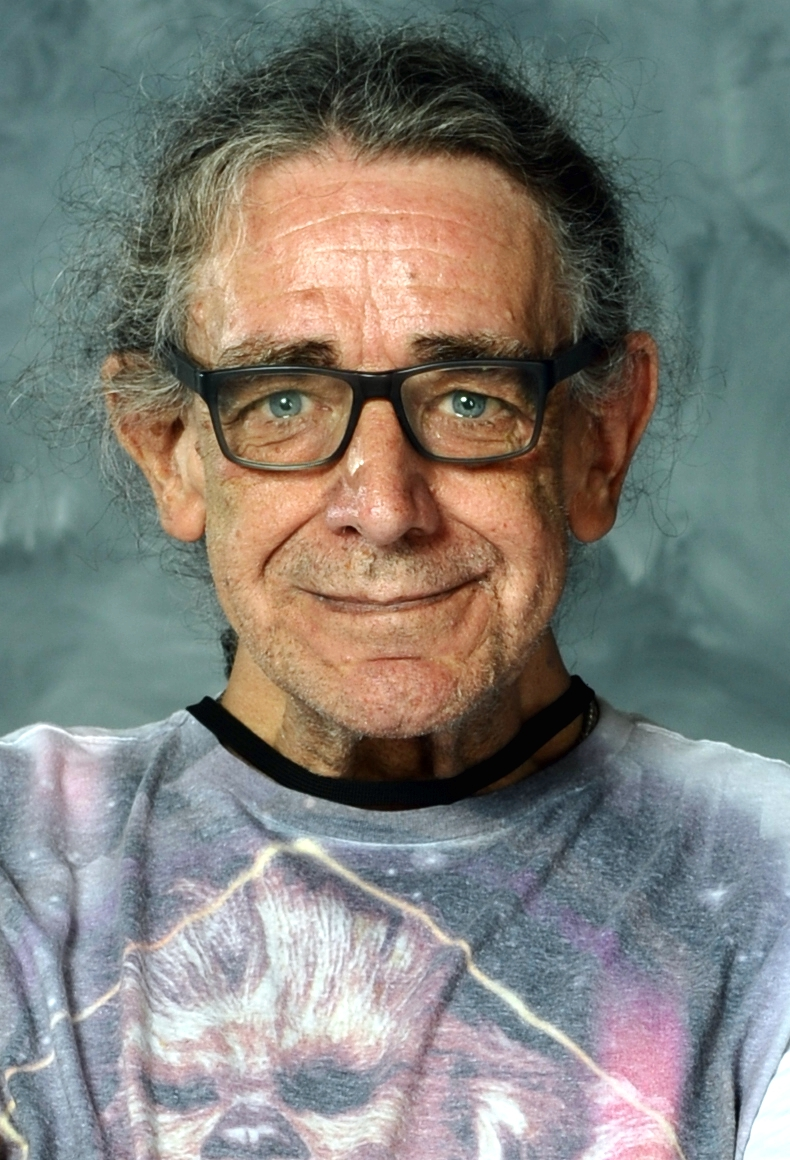
Peter Mayhew in 2015

- 1 April – Michael William Feast, 92, British-born South African astronomer.
- 2 April
  - Martin Fido, 79, crime writer, fall.
  - Bill Heine, 74, American-born British radio broadcaster (BBC Radio Oxford), leukaemia.
  - Harry Judge, 90, English educational theorist.
- 3 April – Billy Mainwaring, 78, Welsh rugby union player (Aberavon, Bridgend, national team).
- 5 April – John Quarmby, 89, (Fawlty Towers, K-9 and Company, A Christmas Carol
- 6 April – David J. Thouless, 84, physicist, Nobel Prize laureate (2016).
- 7 April
  - Mya-Lecia Naylor, 16, English actress (Millie Inbetween), hanged by misadventure.
  - Willie McPheat, 76, Scottish footballer (Sunderland, Hartlepool United, Airdrieonians).
  - Sandy Ratcliff, 70, English actress (EastEnders).
- 8 April
  - Clive Cohen, 73, English Anglican priest.
  - Rex Garrod, 75, inventor, roboteer (Brum, Robot Wars) and television presenter (The Secret Life of Machines), complications from Alzheimer's disease.
  - Sir Alexander Reid, 3rd Baronet, 86, English aristocrat and public servant.
- 11 April
  - Ian Cognito, 60, English stand-up comedian, heart attack.
  - Una-Mary Parker, 89, English journalist and novelist.
- 12 April
  - Ivor Broadis, 96, English footballer (Carlisle United, Newcastle United).
  - John McEnery, 75, English actor (Romeo and Juliet, Nicholas and Alexandra, The Land That Time Forgot) and writer.
  - Norrie Muir, 70, Scottish climber.
  - Paul Rawlinson, 56, lawyer, head of Baker McKenzie (since 2016).
  - Tommy Smith, 74, English professional footballer, dementia.
- 13 April
  - Tony Buzan, 76, English author and educational consultant.
  - Winifred Jordan, 99, English sprinter.
  - Paul Raymond, 73, English musician (Plastic Penny, UFO, Savoy Brown), heart attack.
- 14 April – Colin Collindridge, 98, English footballer (Sheffield United, Nottingham Forest).
- 15 April
  - Martin King, 86, British actor (Captain Scarlet and the Mysterons Joe 90)
  - Sir Roger Moate, 80, politician, MP (1970–1997), cancer.
  - Malky McCormick, 76, Scottish cartoonist, vascular dementia.
  - Les Reed, 83, English songwriter ("It's Not Unusual", "Delilah", "The Last Waltz") and musician.
- 17 April – Sir Clive Rose, 97, diplomat.
- 18 April
  - John Bowen, 94, writer.
  - Con de Lange, 38, South African-born Scottish cricketer (Northamptonshire), brain tumour.
  - Andrew Mallard, 56, British-born Australian wrongfully convicted prisoner, traffic collision.
  - Lyra McKee, 29, Northern Irish journalist.
- 19 April
  - Philip Liner, 93, British-born New Zealand radio broadcaster (National Radio).
  - Michael Yorke, 80, Anglican priest, Dean of Lichfield (1999–2005).
- 20 April
  - Joe Armstrong, 68, computer scientist, designer of Erlang.
  - Charlie Kelsall, 98, Welsh footballer (Wrexham).
- 21 April
  - Polly Higgins, 50, Scottish environmentalist, cancer.
  - Doreen Spooner, 91, photographer.
- 22 April
  - Heather Harper, 88, Northern Irish soprano, Grammy winner (1980, 1985).
  - Billy McNeill, 79, Scottish footballer (Celtic) and manager (Aberdeen), dementia.
- 23 April
  - George Haigh, 103, English footballer.
  - Edward Kelsey, 88, English actor (The Archers, Danger Mouse).
  - Terry Rawlings, 85–86, film editor (Alien, Blade Runner, Chariots of Fire).
  - Peter Skipper, 61, English footballer (Hull City), complications from a stroke.
  - David Winters, 80, English-American actor and choreographer (West Side Story).
- 25 April – Sir Nigel Seely, 95, English aristocrat.
- 26 April – Sir David McNee, 94, Scottish police officer, Commissioner of the Metropolitan Police (1977–1982).
- 27 April – Joseph Ward, 76, English tenor.
- 29 April
  - Stevie Chalmers, 83, Scottish footballer (Celtic).
  - Betty Lockwood, Baroness Lockwood, 95, political activist and life peer, Member of the House of Lords (1978–2007).
  - John Llewellyn Moxey, 94, Argentinian-born British director (The City of the Dead, Foxhole in Cairo, Circus of Fear).
- 30 April
  - Boon Gould, 64, English musician (Level 42).
  - Peter Mayhew, 74, English-American actor (Star Wars), heart attack.

=== May ===
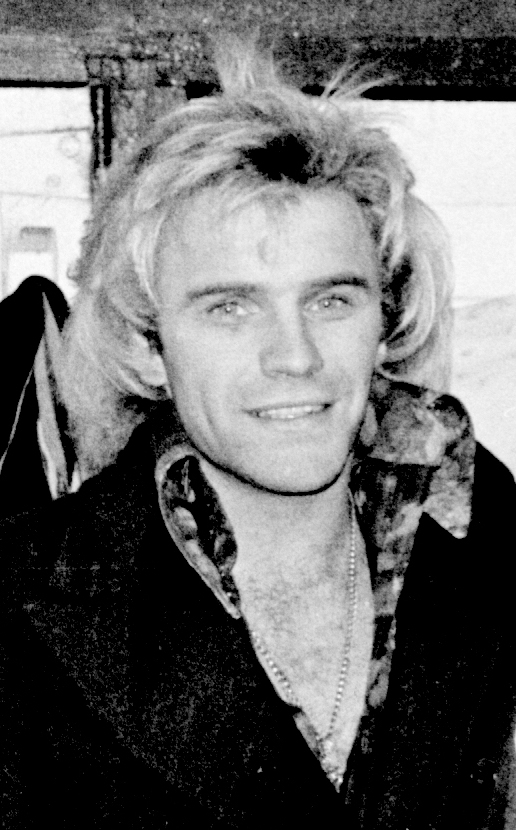
Freddie Starr in 1976

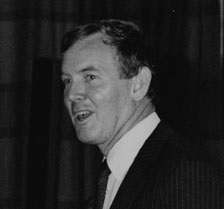
John Moore, Baron Moore of Lower Marsh in 1985

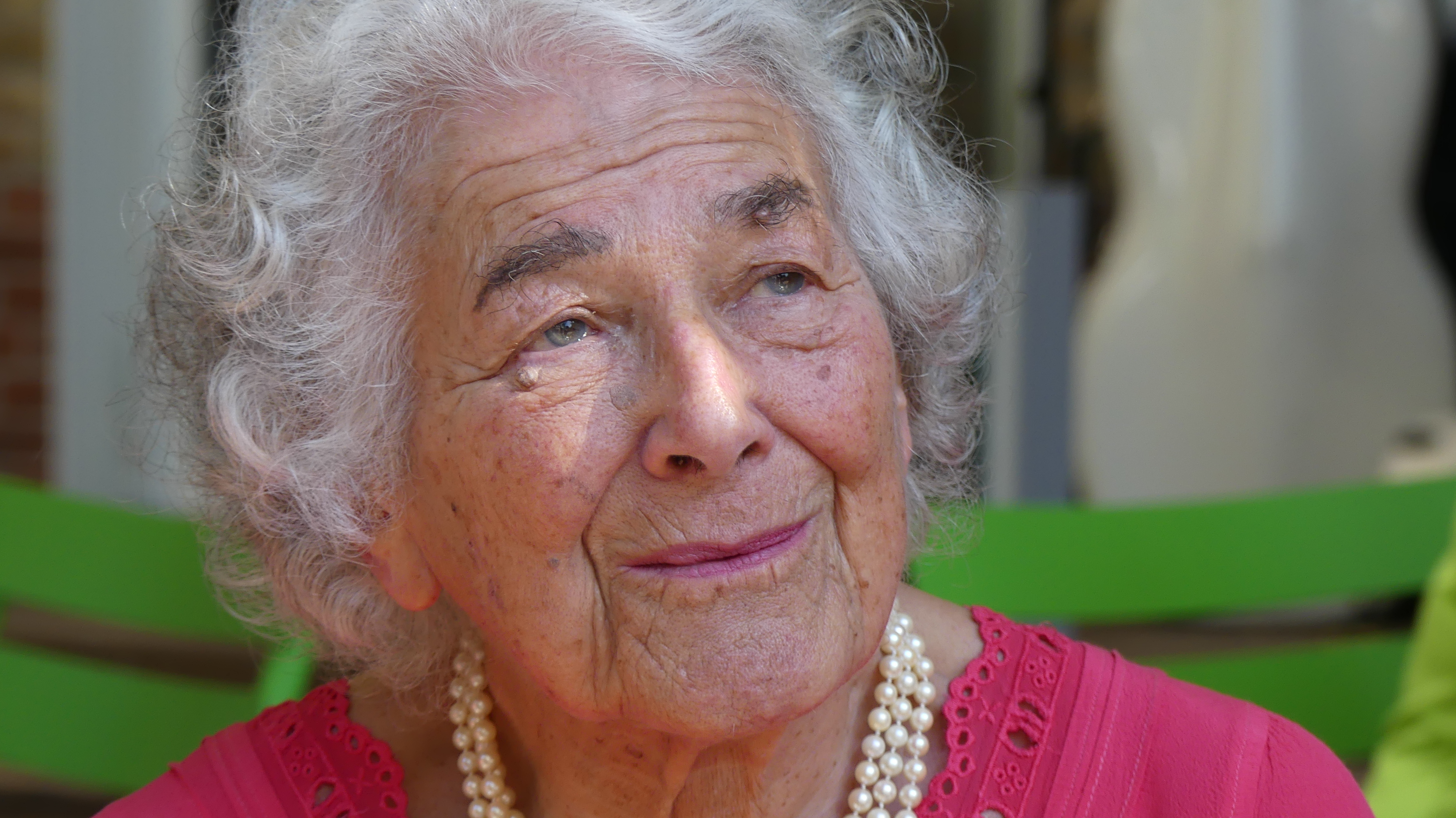
Judith Kerr in 2016

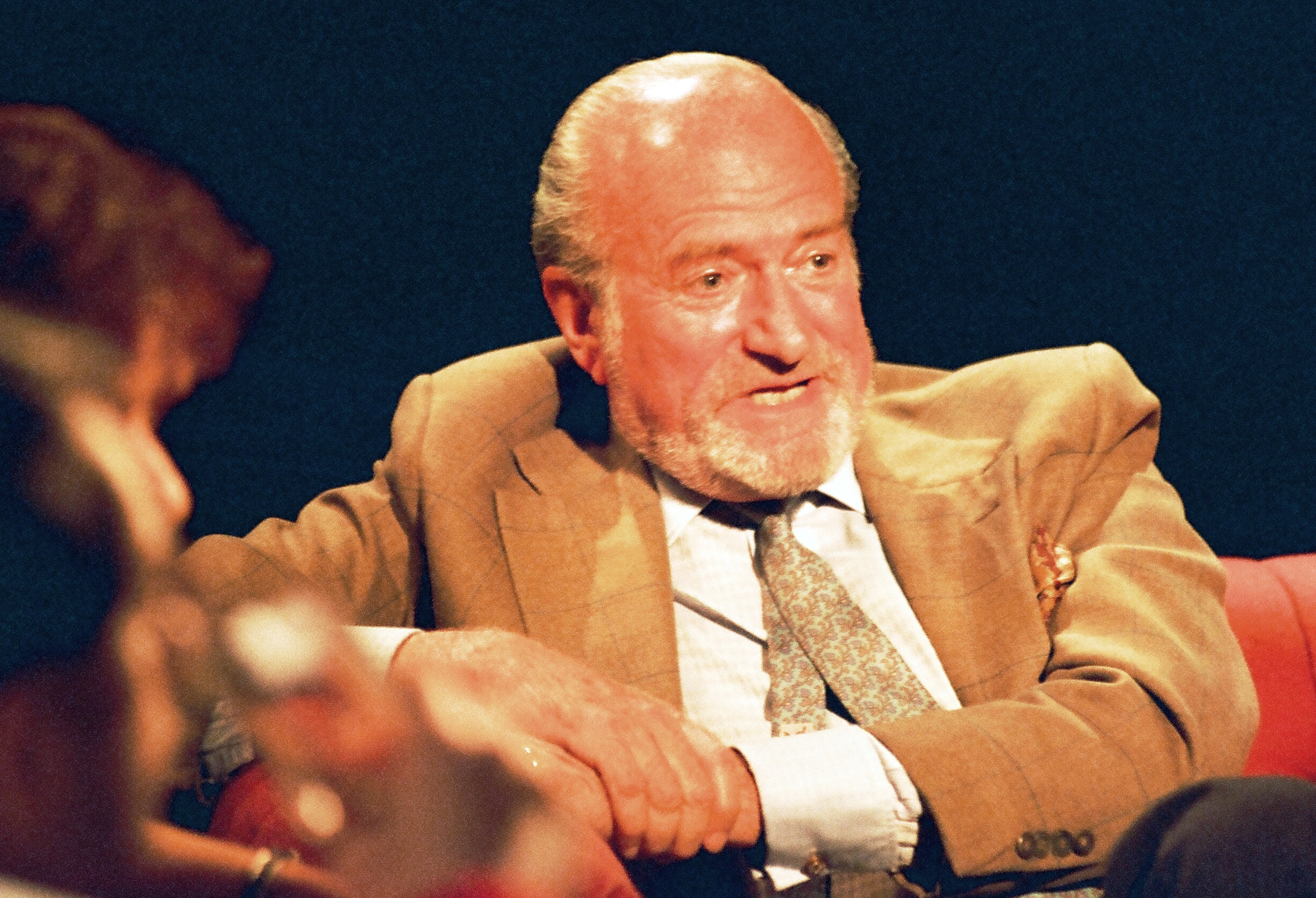
Claus von Bülow in 1997

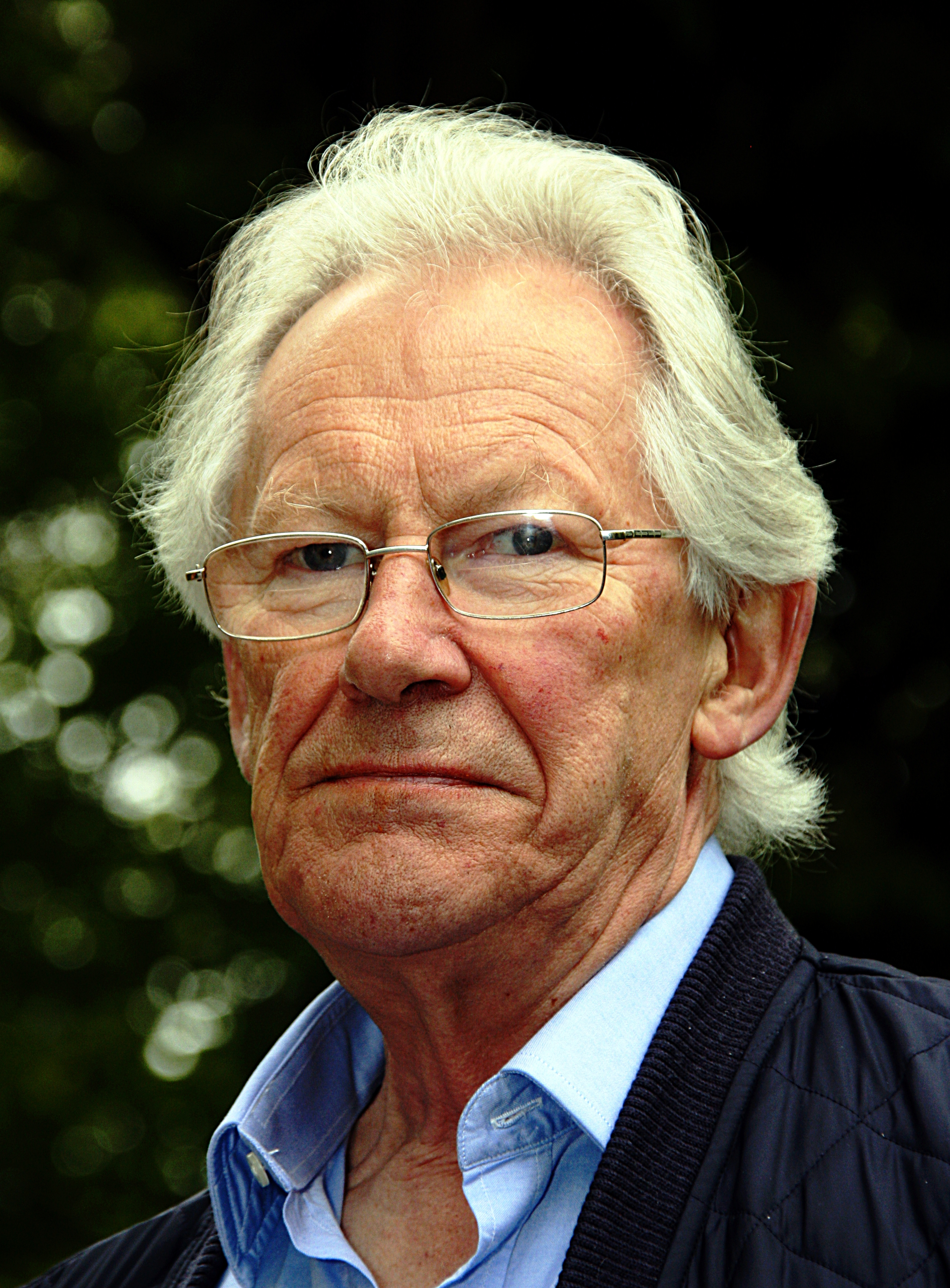
Stephen Thorne in 2011

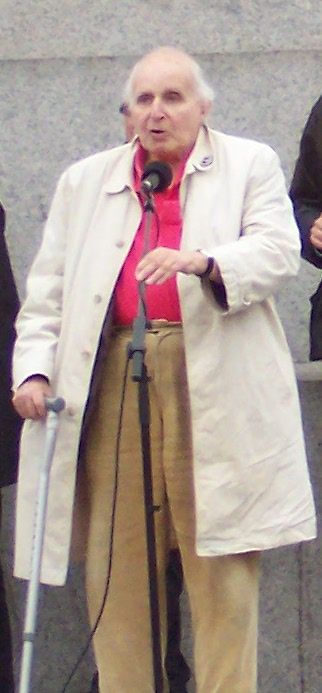
Walter Wolfgang in 2007

- 2 May
  - Lord Toby Jug, 53, politician.
  - David Gordon Wilson, 91, British-born American professor of engineering.
- 3 May
  - Sir Peter Herbert, 90, admiral.
  - Irene Sutcliffe, 94, English actress (Coronation Street)
- 4 May – Tommy Sopwith, 86, racing driver and businessman.
- 6 May
  - Jack Cohen, 85, scientist and author.
  - Ted Witherden, 97, English cricketer.
- 7 May – Seamus Close, 71, Northern Irish politician, liver cancer.
- 9 May
  - Walter Harris, 93, author and broadcaster.
  - Freddie Starr, 76, English comedian, heart disease.
  - Micky Steele-Bodger, 93, English rugby union player (Harlequin, Barbarian).
  - Dan van der Vat, Dutch-born British journalist and naval historian.
  - Brian Walden, 86, journalist and broadcaster (Weekend World) and politician, MP (1964–1977), emphysema.
- 10 May
  - Jon Gittens, 55, English footballer (Swindon Town, Portsmouth, Exeter City).
  - Richard L. Hills, 82, English historian and clergyman.
  - Janet Kitz, 89, Scottish-born Canadian historian and author (Shattered City: The Halifax Explosion and the Road to Recovery).
  - John MacInnes, 89, Scottish Gaelic scholar.
  - Gordon Neate, 78, English footballer (Reading).
- 11 May
  - Melissa Ede, 58, English transgender campaigner and social media personality, heart attack.
  - Nan Winton, 93, broadcaster, first woman to read BBC News on television, fall.
- 12 May
  - Dale Greig, 81, Scottish long-distance runner.
  - Doug McAvoy, 80, trade union leader, General Secretary of the National Union of Teachers (1989–2004).
  - Alan Skirton, 80, English footballer (Bath City, Arsenal), Alzheimer's disease.
- 13 May – George Smith, 75, Scottish football referee.
- 14 May – Tommy Donbavand, 53, English children's author (Scream Street) and actor, throat and lung cancer.
- 15 May
  - Kenneth Newing, 95, Anglican prelate, Bishop of Plymouth (1982–1988).
  - John Ronane, 85, actor (Strangers).
- 16 May – Geoff Toseland, 88, English footballer (Sunderland).
- 18 May – Sir Timothy Kitson, 88, politician, MP for Richmond, North Yorkshire (1959–1983).
- 20 May
  - Andrew Hall, 65, English actor (Butterflies, Casualty, Coronation Street).
  - John Moore, Baron Moore of Lower Marsh, 81, politician, MP (1974–1992).
- 21 May – Royce Mills, 77, English actor (History of the World, Part I, Up the Chastity Belt, Doctor Who).
- 22 May
  - Maurice Bamford, 83, English rugby league player and coach (Wigan Warriors, Leeds Rhinos, Great Britain).
  - Judith Kerr, 95, German-born writer and illustrator (The Tiger Who Came to Tea, Mog).
- 23 May – Joseph Devine, 81, Scottish Roman Catholic prelate, Bishop of Motherwell (1983–2013).
- 24 May – Edmund Morris, 78, Kenyan-born British-American writer (The Rise of Theodore Roosevelt, Dutch: A Memoir of Ronald Reagan), Pulitzer Prize winner (1980), stroke.
- 25 May
  - Margaret-Ann Armour, 79, Scottish-born Canadian chemist.
  - Claus von Bülow, 92, Danish-British socialite.
- 26 May
  - Harry Hood, 74, Scottish footballer (Celtic) and manager (Queen of the South), cancer.
  - Stephen Thorne, 84, English actor (Z-Cars, Crossroads, Doctor Who).
- 27 May
  - Sir David Sieff, 80 businessman (Marks & Spencer).
  - Alan Smith, 97, English footballer (Arsenal, Brentford).
- 28 May
  - Ralph Murphy, 75, British-born Canadian country musician, cancer.
  - Walter Wolfgang, 95, German-born socialist and peace activist.
- 29 May
  - Adam Patel, Baron Patel of Blackburn, 78, clothier and Member of the House of Lords (since 2000).
  - Michael Spicer, 76, politician, MP (1974–2010), chairman of the 1922 Committee (2001–2010) and Member of the House of Lords (since 2010), Parkinson's disease and leukaemia.
- 30 May
  - Anthony Price, 90, author.
  - Andrew Sinclair, 84, polymathic novelist, speechwriter and film director
  - John Tidmarsh, 90, English broadcaster and journalist (Outlook).

=== June ===
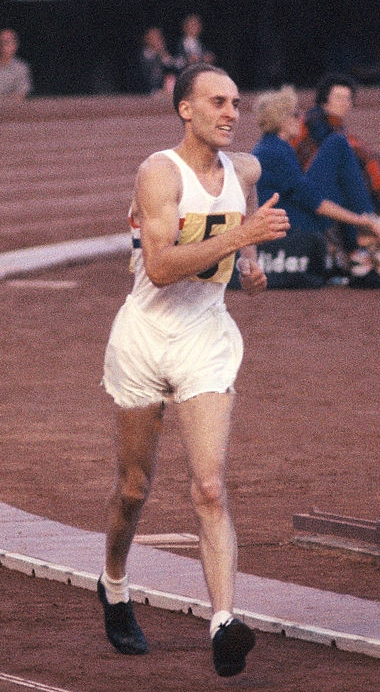
Ken Matthews in 1964

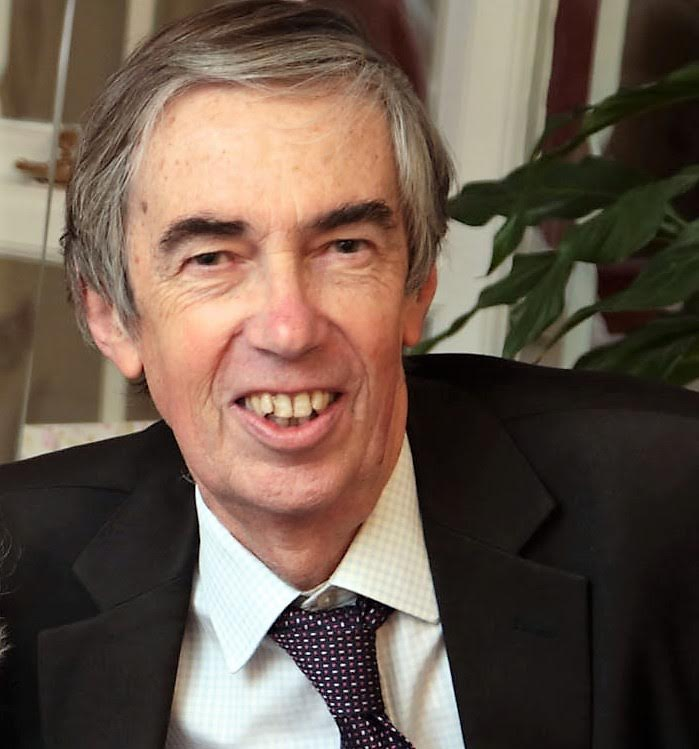
Noel Lloyd in 2017

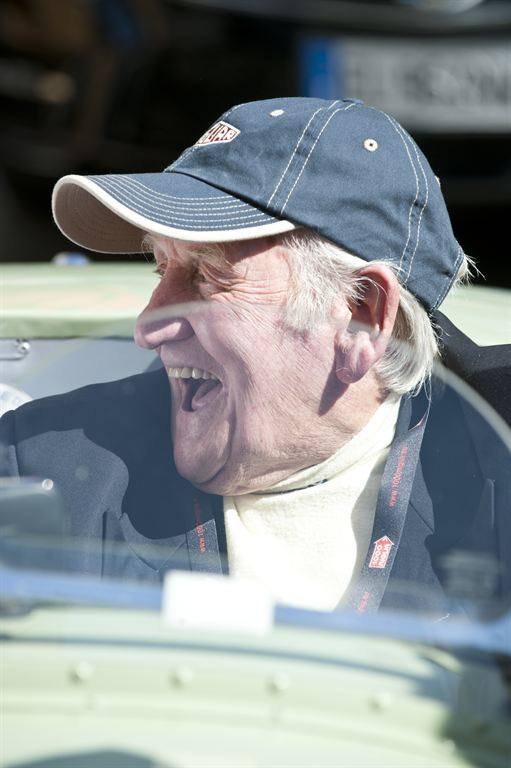
Norman Dewis in 2012

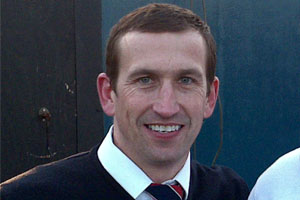
Justin Edinburgh in 2010

- 1 June
  - John Myers, 60, radio executive (GMG Radio, Radio Academy) and presenter, cancer.
  - Alasdair Walker, 62, physician and military officer, brain cancer.
- 2 June
  - Barry Hughes, 81, Welsh footballer and manager (Go Ahead Eagles, Sparta Rotterdam, HFC Haarlem).
  - Ken Matthews, 84, English race walker, Olympic champion (1964).
  - Stuart Mustow, 90, civil engineer
  - Alan Rollinson, 76, English racing driver, cancer.
- 3 June
  - Ian Craft, 81, physician.
  - Roy Cruttenden, 94, Olympic long jumper.
  - Paul Darrow, 78, English actor (Blake's 7, Doctor Who).
  - Max Kay, 82, Scottish-born Australian entertainer and manager (Andy Stewart), pneumonia as a complication of cancer.
- 4 June
  - George Darwin, 87, English footballer (Huddersfield Town, Mansfield Town, Derby County, Rotherham United, Barrow).
  - Robin Herd, 80, English engineer, designer and businessman, co-founder of March Engineering.
  - Lawrie Leslie, 84, Scottish footballer (Hibernian, West Ham United, Stoke City, Millwall, Southend United).
- 5 June
  - Claire Donovan, 71, historian.
  - Geoff Lees, 85, English footballer (Bradford City, Barnsley).
  - Sir David Plastow, 87, businessman.
- 6 June – Johnny Robinson, 83, English footballer (Bury, Oldham Athletic).
- 7 June – Noel Lloyd, 72, Welsh academic, vice-chancellor of Aberystwyth University (2004–2011).
- 8 June
  - Norman Dewis, 98, racing driver and engineer.
  - Justin Edinburgh, 49, English footballer (Southend United, Tottenham Hotspur, Portsmouth) and manager (Newport County, Gillingham, Northampton Town, Leyton Orient), cardiac arrest.
- 9 June – Bill Bryant, 78, English rugby league player (Castleford).
- 10 June
  - Tom Derek Bowden, 97, military officer.
  - Peter Whitehead, 82, English writer and filmmaker (Wholly Communion, Charlie Is My Darling, Tonite Let's All Make Love in London).
  - Cecil Woolf, 92, English author and publisher.
- 17 June – Ian MacFarlane, 86, Scottish footballer (Aberdeen, Chelsea, Leicester City) and manager (Carlisle United, Sunderland, Leicester City).
- 19 June
  - Bobby Brown, 87, Scottish footballer (Workington)
  - Lionheart, 36, professional wrestler (ICW).
  - Dennis White, 70, English footballer (Hartlepool United).
- 21 June – William Simons, 78, Welsh-born actor, (Heartbeat, Crown Court, Where No Vultures Fly).
- 24 June – Graham Barnett, 83, English footballer (Port Vale, Tranmere Rovers, Halifax Town)
- 25 June
  - Bryan Marshall, 81, actor, (The Spy Who Loved Me, Quatermass and the Pit, The Long Good Friday)
  - Eurig Wyn, 74, Welsh politician
- 26 June
  - Simon Bendall, 82, English numismatist.
  - Douglas Fielding, 73, actor, (Z-Cars, EastEnders)
- 30 June – Glyn Houston, 93, Welsh actor, (Doctor Who, Keep It in the Family)

=== July ===
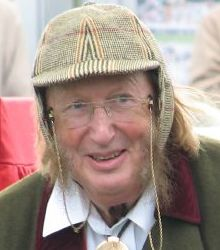
John McCririck in 2006

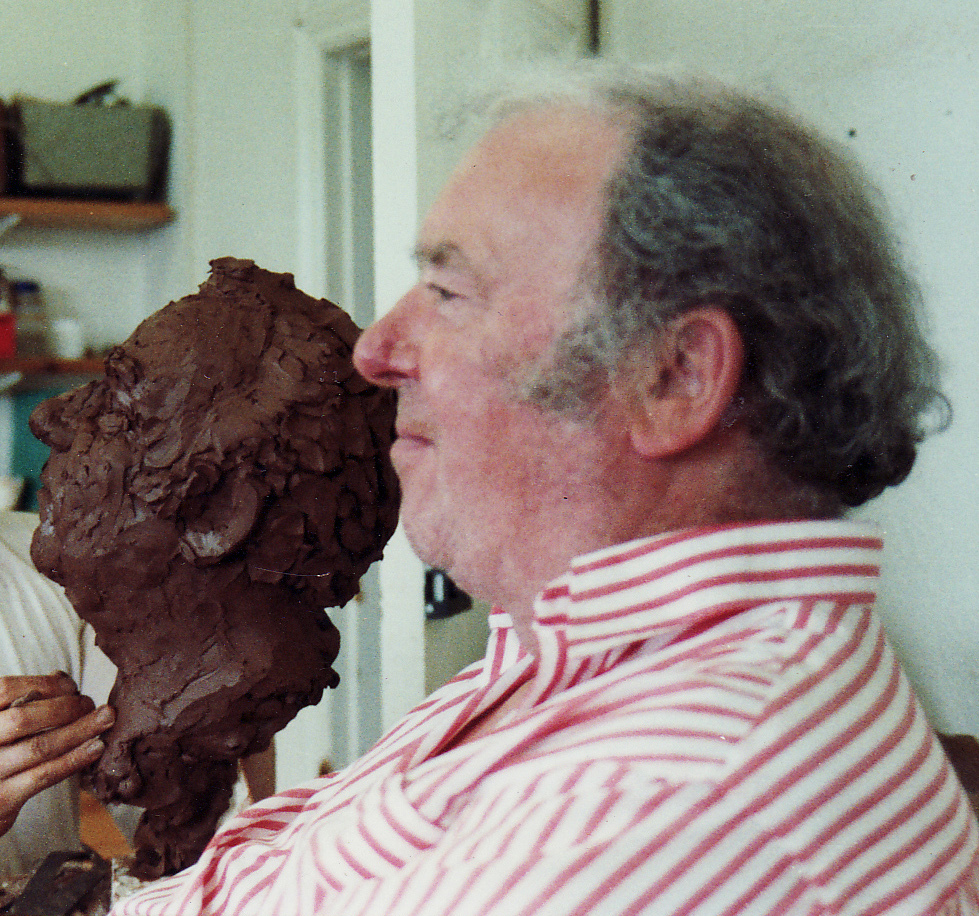
Freddie Jones (right) in 2009

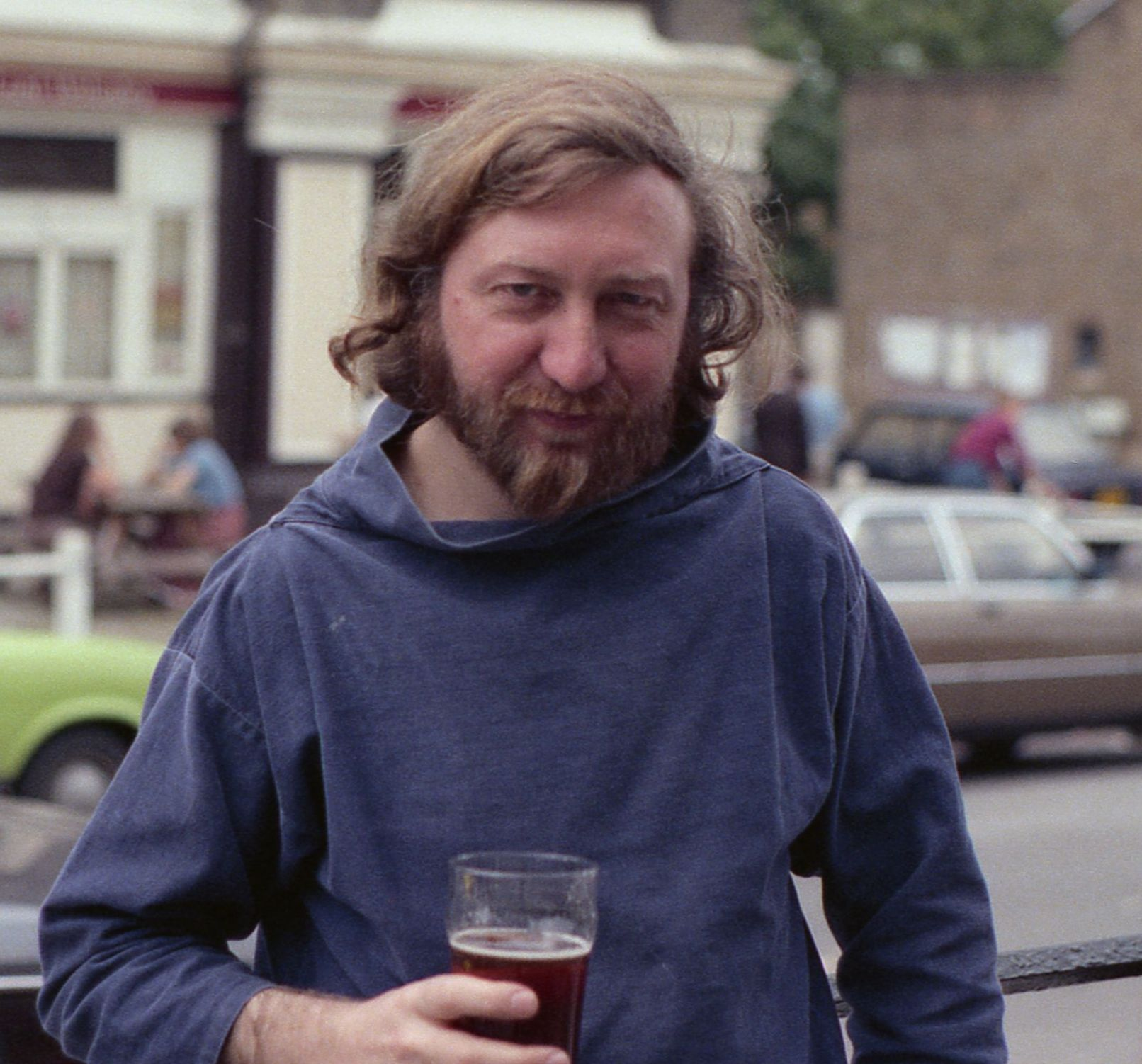
Cyril Edwards in 1983

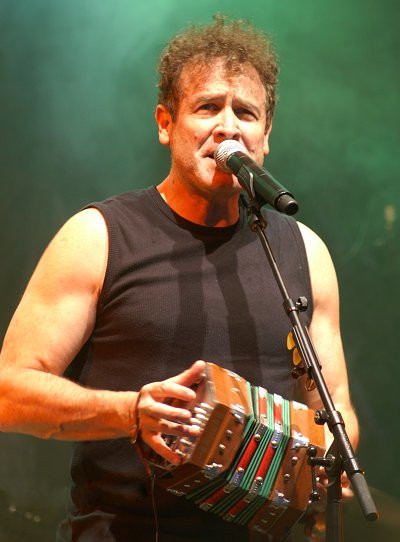
Johnny Clegg in 2009

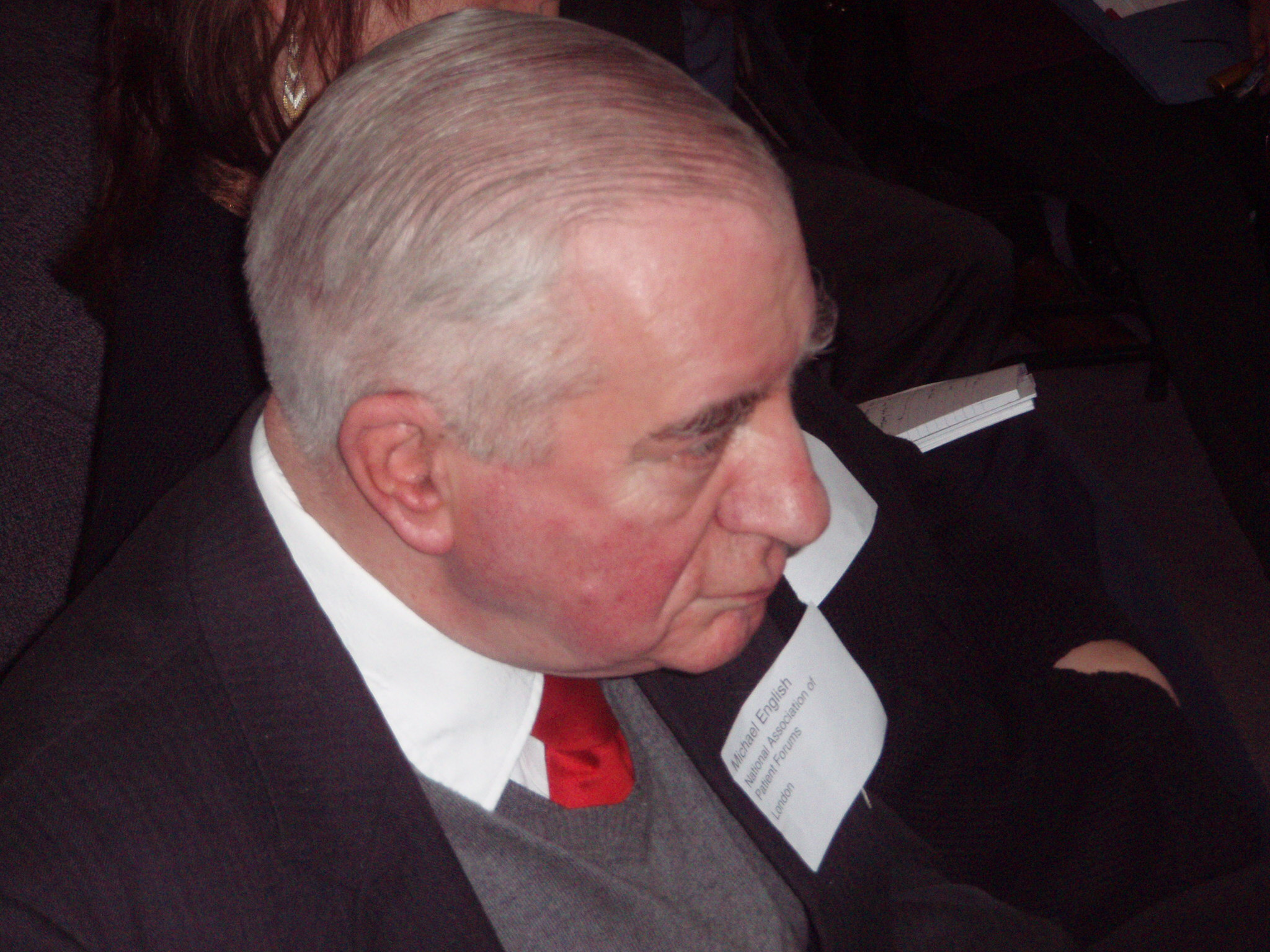
Michael English in 2008

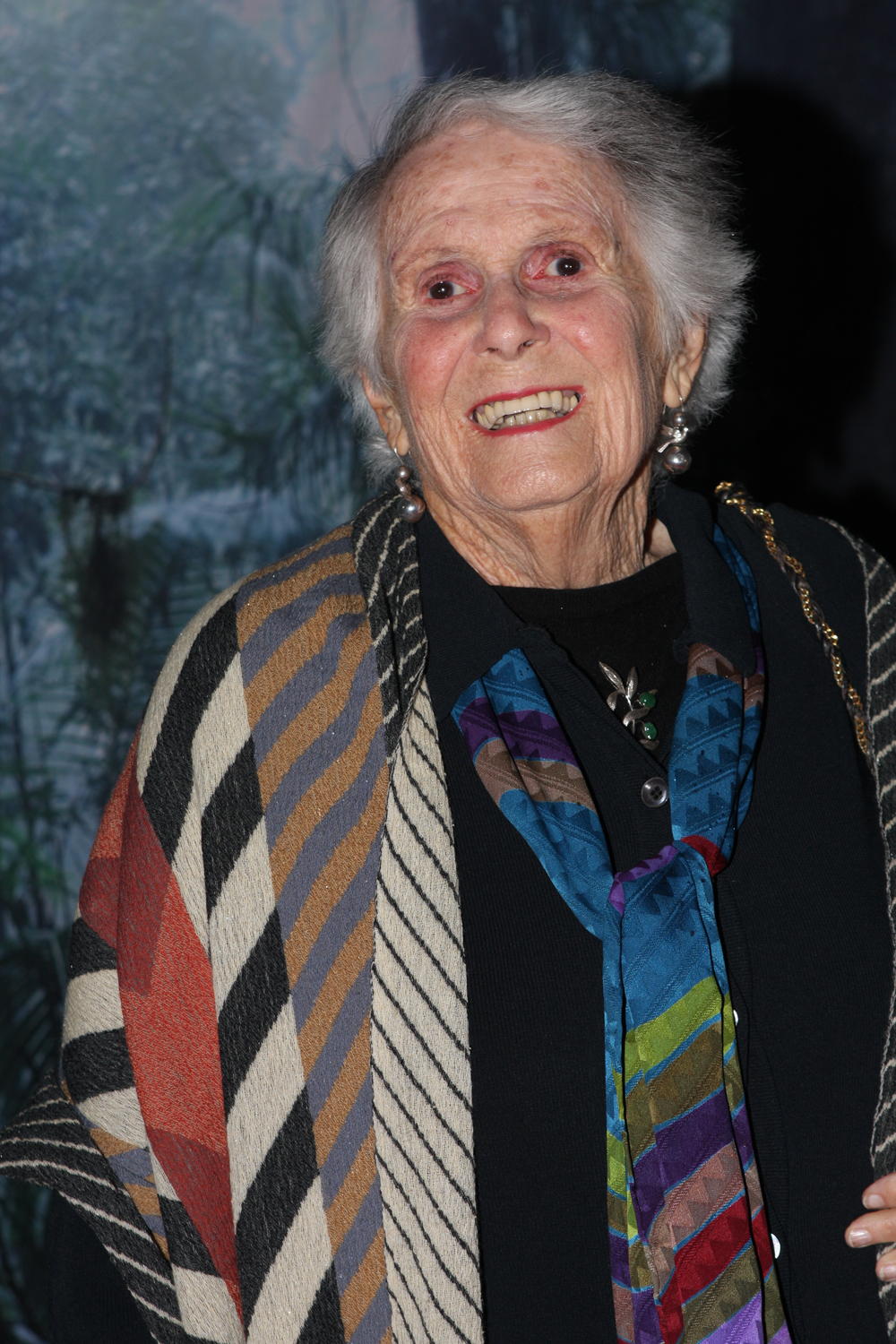
Margaret Fulton in 2012

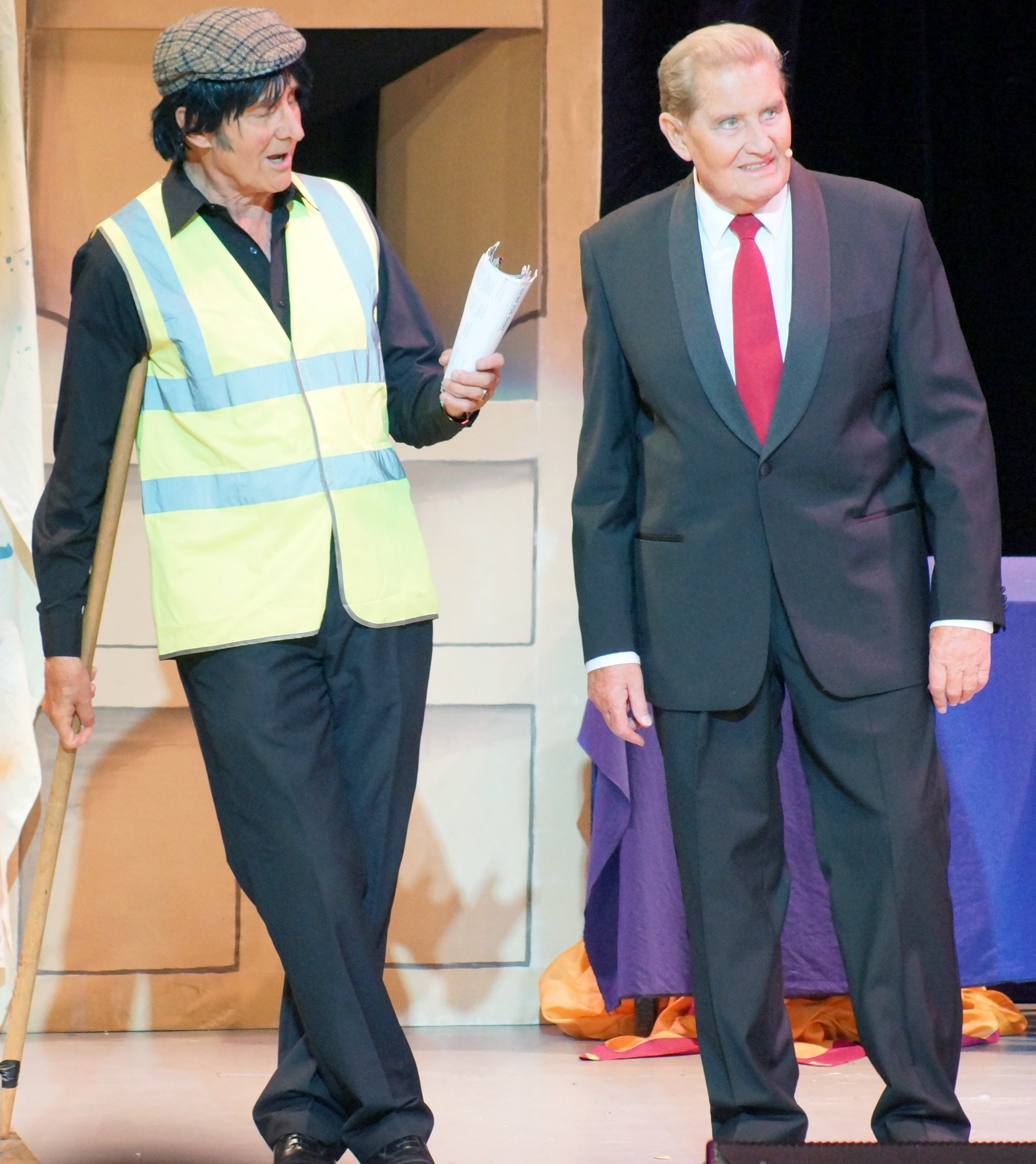
Jimmy Patton (right) in 2013

- 1 July – Bob Collymore, 61, Guyanese-born telecom executive, CEO of Safaricom (since 2010), acute myeloid leukaemia.
- 2 July – Diana Henderson, 72, solicitor, army officer and historian.
- 3 July
  - Christopher Booker, 81, English journalist (The Sunday Telegraph, Private Eye) and author.
  - Julia Farron, 96, English ballerina.
  - Alan Rogan, 68, English guitar technician (The Who), cancer.
  - Edward Shotter, 86, Anglican priest and author, Dean of Rochester (1989–2003).
- 4 July – Leon Kossoff, 92, English painter, stroke.
- 5 July
  - Sir Wynn Hugh-Jones, 95, diplomat and politician.
  - John McCririck, 79, English television horse racing pundit, (ITV Racing, Channel 4 Racing).
- 7 July
  - Jonathan Hodge, 78, composer (Henry's Cat, Fiddley Foodle Bird, Babe), multiple organ failure.
  - Jeff Ingber, 83, English table tennis player.
  - Elizabeth Killick, 94, naval electronics engineer, heart attack.
- 9 July
  - Neil Greatrex, 68, English trade unionist and convicted fraudster, President of the Union of Democratic Mineworkers (1993–2009), complications from brain haemorrhage.
  - Freddie Jones, 91, English actor, (Emmerdale, The Elephant Man, The Ghosts of Motley Hall).
- 10 July
  - Motto McLean, 93, Scottish-born Canadian ice hockey player (Omaha Knights).
  - Albert Shepherd, 82, English actor, (The Anniversary, Crossroads, Rosie).
- 11 July
  - Jack Bond, 87, English cricketer (Lancashire).
  - Robert Entwistle, 77, English cricketer (Minor Counties, Cumberland, Lancashire).
  - John Gardner, 54, Scottish legal philosopher, oesophageal cancer.
- 12 July
  - Emily Hartridge, 35, English YouTube and television presenter
  - Matthew Trundle, 53, British-born New Zealand classics and ancient history academic (University of Auckland), leukemia.
- 13 July
  - Cyril Edwards, 71, medievalist and translator.
  - Terry Hodgkinson, 70, land developer, Chairman of Yorkshire Forward (2003–2010).
  - Rod Richards, 72, Welsh politician, MP for Clwyd North West (1992–1997), Leader of the Welsh Conservative Party (1999), cancer.
- 14 July – Claire Dwyer, 55, geographer, cancer.
- 15 July
  - Craig Fallon, 36, English judoka, world champion (2005).
  - Sir Fergus Millar, 84, ancient historian, Camden Professor of Ancient History (1984–2002).
  - Sir Rex Richards, 96, chemist and academic.
  - Joe Rayment, 84, English footballer (Middlesbrough, Hartlepool United, Darlington).
- 16 July
  - Johnny Clegg, 66, British-born South African singer and musician (Juluka, Savuka), pancreatic cancer.
  - Michael English, 88, politician, MP for Nottingham West (1964–1983).
  - Jonathan Gathorne-Hardy, 86, author.
- 19 July
  - Jeremy Kemp, 84, English actor (The Winds of War, Z-Cars, The Blue Max).
  - William Morton, 58, Scottish cricketer (Warwickshire Bears, national team).
- 20 July – Paul Barker, 83, journalist.
- 21 July – Trish Godman, 79, Scottish MSP (1999–2011).
- 23 July
  - Ruth Gotlieb, 96, British-born New Zealand politician, Wellington City Councillor (1983–2001).
  - Bobby Park, 73, Scottish footballer (Aston Villa, Wrexham, Peterborough United, Northampton Town, Hartlepool United), cancer.
  - Sir Patrick Sheehy, businessman (BAT Industries).
- 24 July
  - Sammy Chapman, 81, Northern Irish footballer (Mansfield Town, Portsmouth) and manager (Wolverhampton Wanderers).
  - Bernard Evans, 82, English footballer (Wrexham, Queens Park Rangers, Oxford United, Tranmere Rovers).
  - Margaret Fulton, 94, Scottish-born Australian chef and cookbook writer (The Margaret Fulton Cookbook).
  - Sir Freddie Sowrey, 96, air marshal.
- 25 July
  - Jimmy Patton, 87, British comedian (ChuckleVision) and half of the Patton Brothers, cancer.
- 26 July
  - Hugh Brogan, 83, historian and biographer.
  - Bryan Magee, 89, philosopher and politician, MP (1974–1983).
  - Marty Wilson, 62, English poker player, cancer.
- 28 July
  - Peter McConnell, 82, English footballer (Leeds United, Carlisle United, Bradford City).
  - Kevin Stonehouse, 59, English footballer (Blackburn Rovers, Huddersfield Town, Blackpool, Darlington, Rochdale).
- 30 July
  - Ron Hughes, 89, Welsh footballer, (Chester) and manager (Mold Alexandra).
  - John Humble, English hoaxer who claimed to be the Yorkshire Ripper.
  - Malcolm Nash, 74, Welsh cricketer.
  - Ian Van Bellen, 73, English rugby union and rugby league player.
- 31 July – Steve Talboys, 52, English footballer (Wimbledon, Watford).

=== August ===
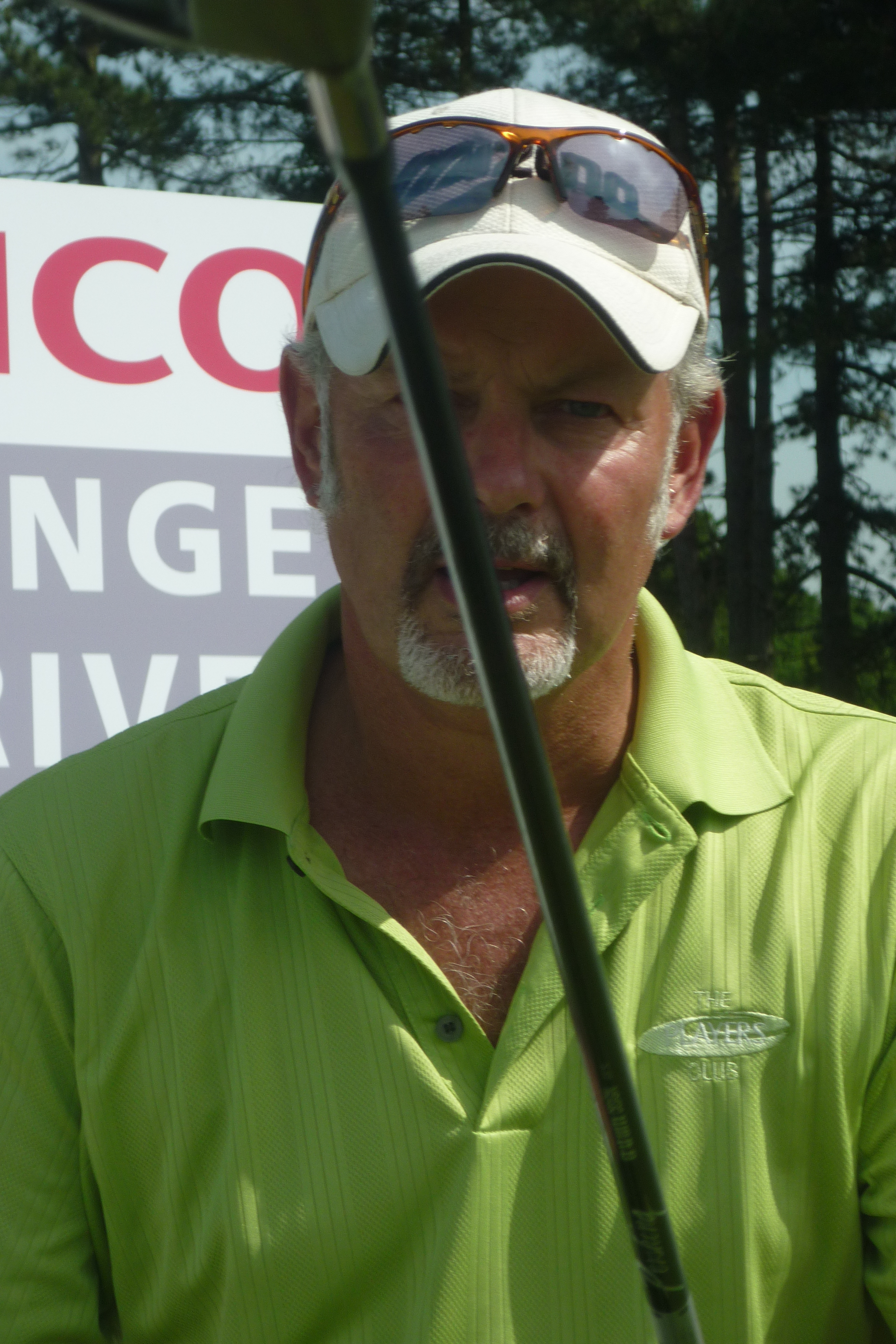
Gordon Brand Jnr

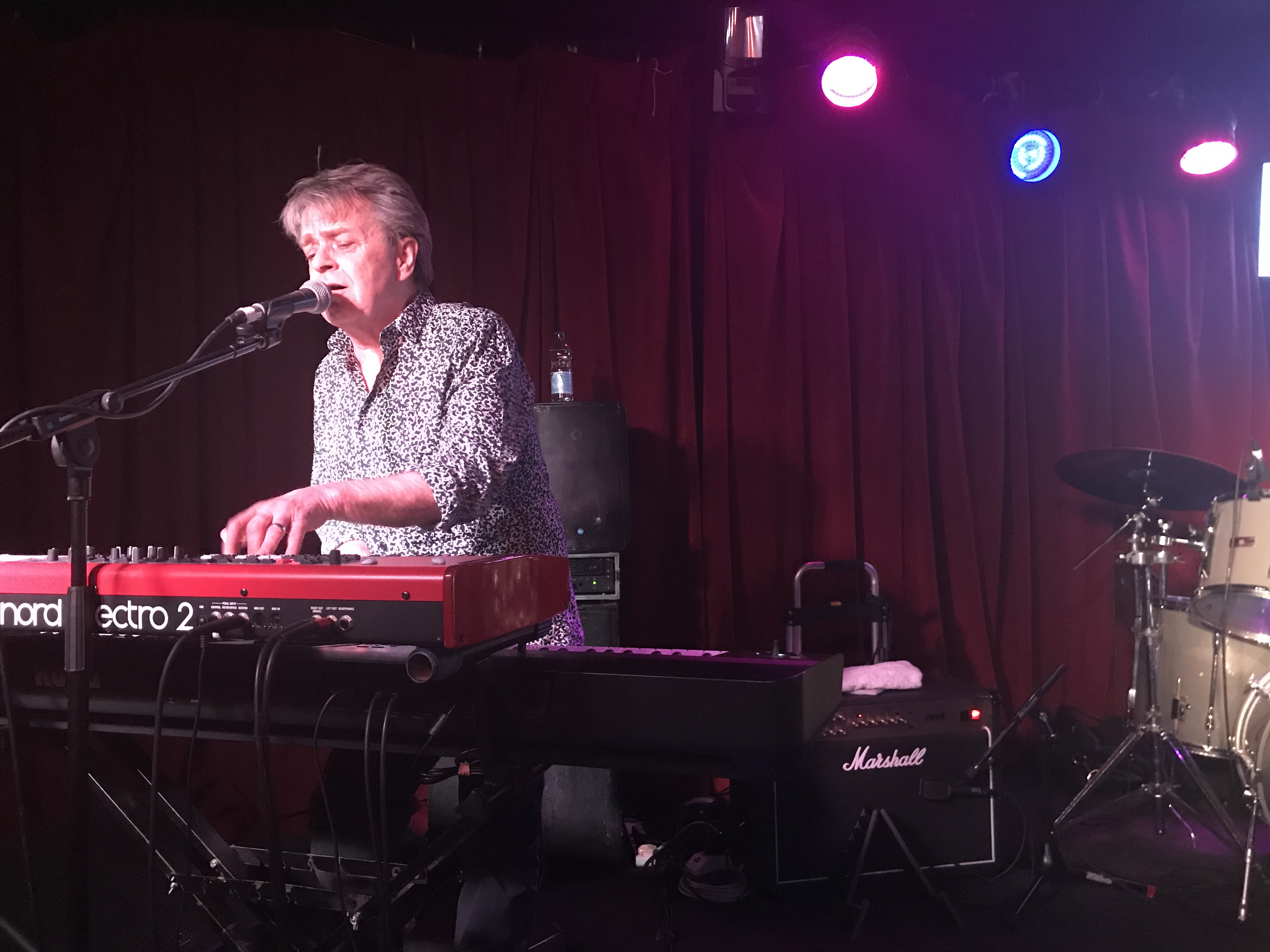
Ian Gibbons in 2018

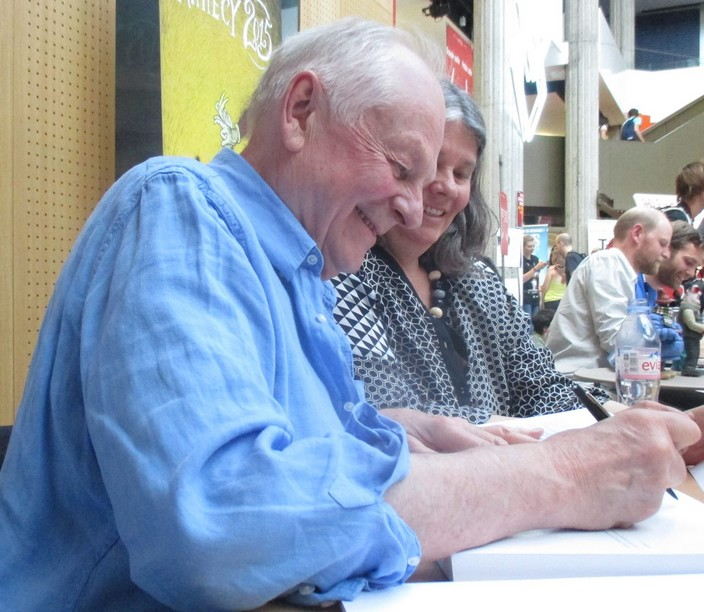
Richard Williams in 2015

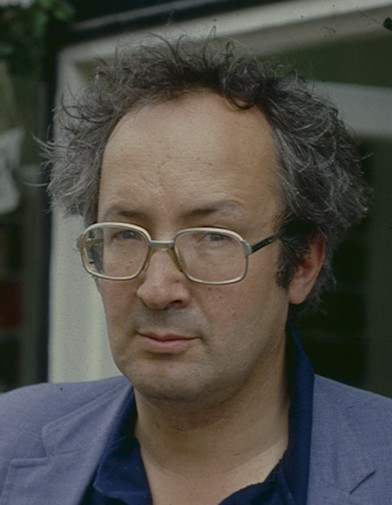
Richard Booth in 1984

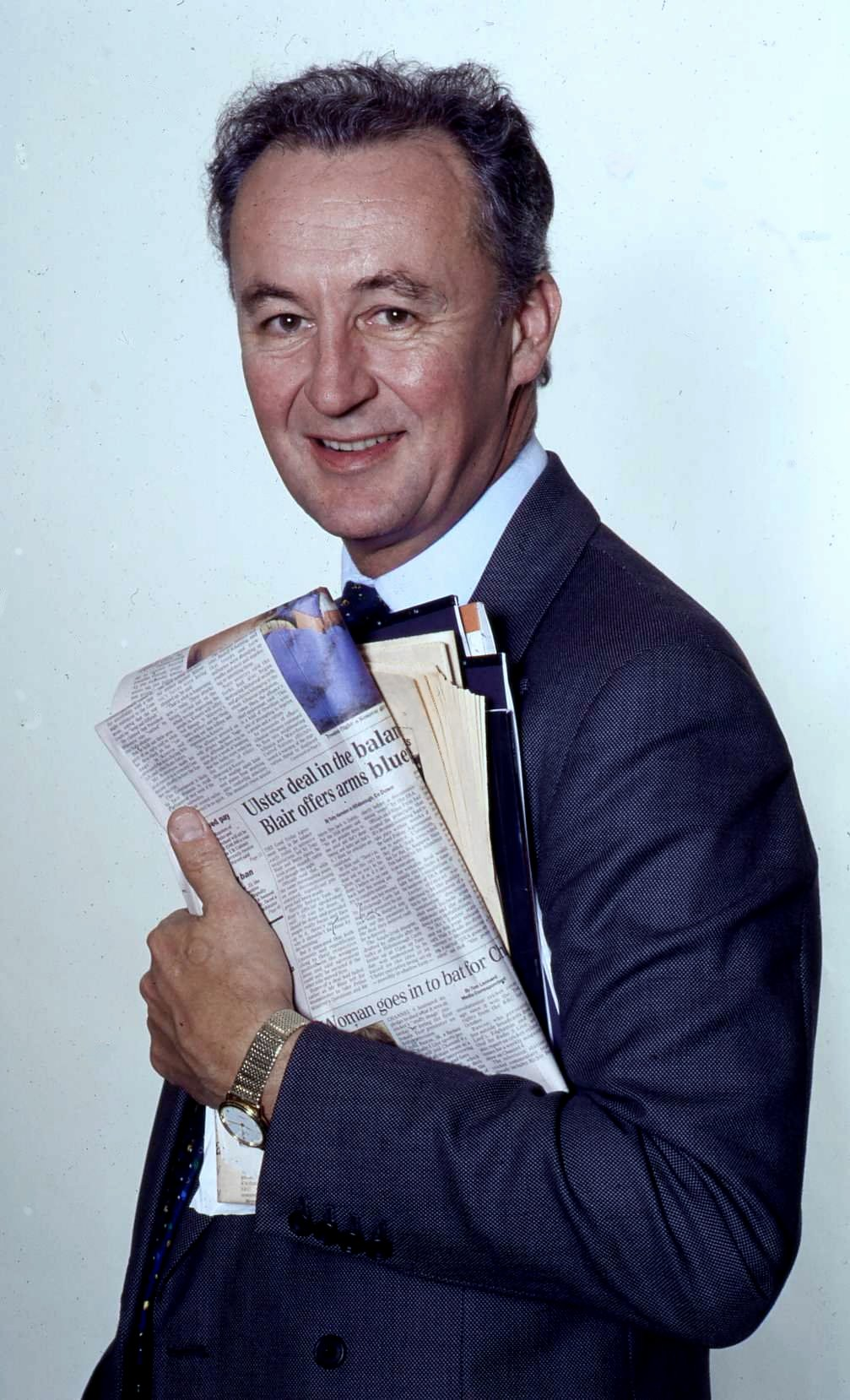
Guy Innes-Ker, 10th Duke of Roxburghe

- 1 August
  - Gordon Brand Jnr, 60, Scottish golfer.
  - William Brown, 74, academic, Master of Darwin College (2000–2012).
  - Ian Gibbons, 67, English keyboardist (The Kinks), bladder cancer.
  - Maurice Pope, 93, classical linguist.
- 3 August
  - Basil Heatley, 85, athlete, marathon world-record holder (1964) and Olympic silver medallist (1964).
  - Joe Longthorne, 64, English singer and entertainer, throat cancer.
- 4 August – Alfred Smith, 111, Scottish supercentenarian, oldest man in Scotland.
- 5 August – John Lowey, 61, English footballer (Sheffield Wednesday, Blackburn Rovers, Chester City).
- 6 August – Steve Parr, 92, English footballer (Liverpool).
- 9 August
  - Huw O. Pritchard, 91, Welsh-born Canadian chemist.
  - Sir Michael Uren, 95, businessman and philanthropist.
- 10 August
  - Freda Dowie, 91, English actress (Distant Voices, Still Lives, The Old Curiosity Shop, The Omen).
  - Jo Lancaster, 100, RAF pilot.
- 11 August
  - Freddy Bannister, 84, English rock concert promoter, cancer.
  - Doug Clarke, 85, English footballer (Hull City, Torquay United, Bury).
  - John Dillon, 76, Scottish footballer (Albion Rovers, Sunderland).
  - Kerry Downes, 88, English architectural historian.
- 12 August
  - Terence Knapp, 87, English actor (Urge to Kill, The Valiant, Othello), director, educator and author.
  - Robyn Léwis, 89, Welsh author, politician and archdruid, Vice President of Plaid Cymru (1970–1976).
- 13 August – Carole Satyamurti, 80, poet, sociologist and translator.
- 16 August
  - Anna Quayle, 86, English actress (Grange Hill)
  - Bobby Smith, 78, English footballer (Barnsley, Chelmsford City).
  - Richard Williams, 86, Canadian-British animator and director (The Thief and the Cobbler, Who Framed Roger Rabbit, A Christmas Carol), three-time Oscar winner, cancer.
- 18 August – Gary Cooper, 80, English rugby league footballer, and coach.
- 20 August – Richard Booth, 80, Welsh bookseller.
- 21 August
  - Richard Gregson, 89, agent, film producer and screenwriter, Parkinson's disease.
  - John W. Neill, 85, Olympic field hockey player (1960, 1964, 1968).
- 23 August – Sheila Steafel, 84, South African-born actress (Daleks' Invasion Earth 2150 A.D., Quatermass and the Pit, The Ghosts of Motley Hall), leukemia.
- 24 August
  - Michael Eagar, 85, English cricketer (Gloucestershire).
  - Ia McIlwaine, 84, librarian.
- 25 August
  - Timothy Bell, Baron Bell, 77, advertising and public relations executive (Bell Pottinger).
  - Alf Burnell, 95, English rugby league footballer, heart attack.
  - Jonathan Goldstein, 50, English composer, plane crash.
  - Sam McGredy, 87, Northern Irish-born New Zealand rose hybridiser (Rosa 'Violet Carson', Rosa 'New Zealand').
- 26 August
  - Ray Henwood, 82, Welsh-born New Zealand actor (Gliding On).
  - Geoffrey Wraith, 72, English rugby league footballer, and coach.
- 28 August – Steve Hiett, 79, English photographer.
- 29 August
  - Terrance Dicks, 84, English screenwriter (Doctor Who, Crossroads, Space: 1999).
  - Guy Innes-Ker, 10th Duke of Roxburghe, 64, aristocrat.
- 30 August
  - James Cellan Jones, 88, Welsh director (The Roads to Freedom, The Forsyte Saga, Fortunes of War), chairman of BAFTA (1983–1985), stroke.
  - Stephen Cretney, 83, legal scholar.

=== September ===
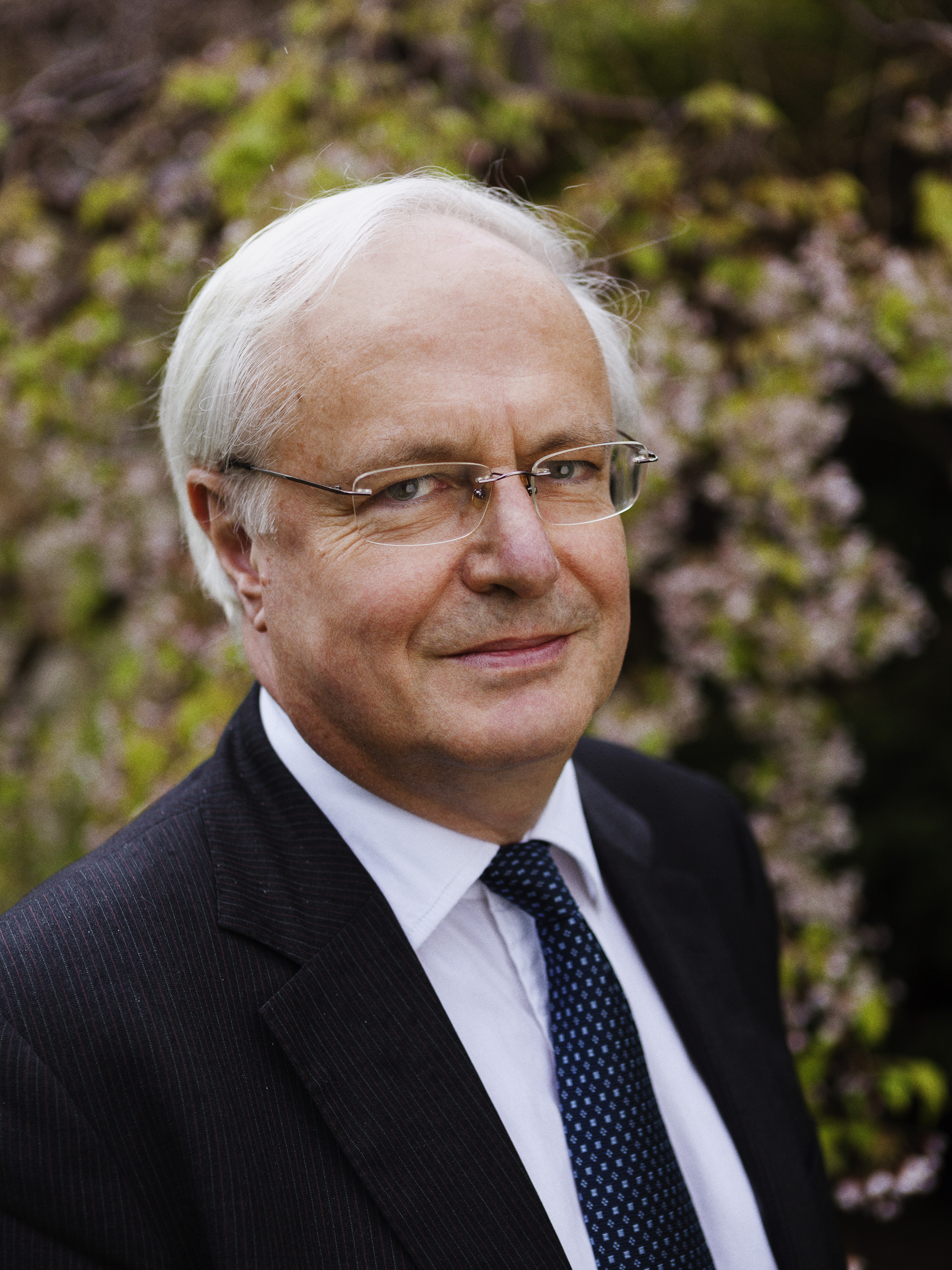
Chris Dobson in 2014

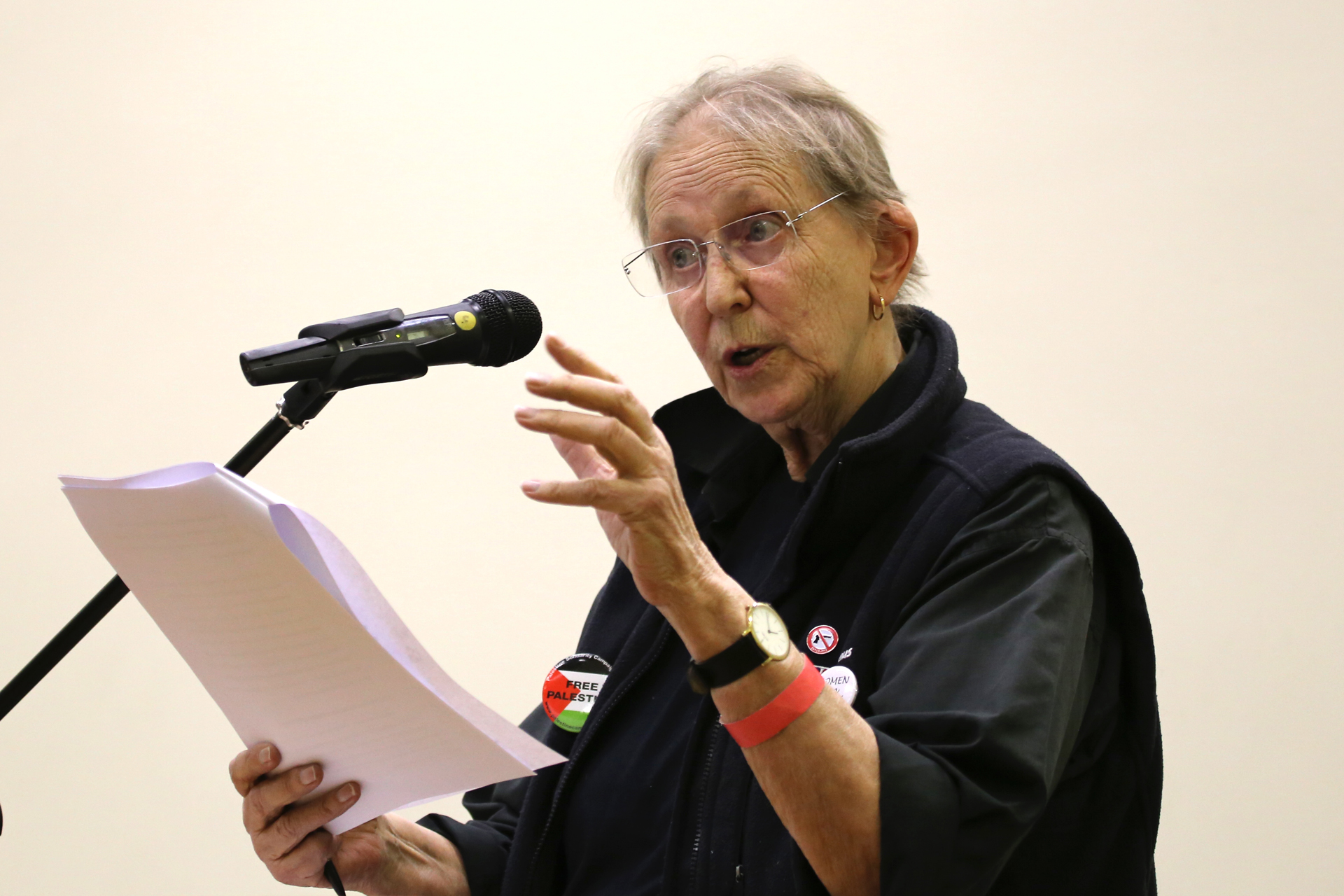
Cynthia Cockburn in 2015

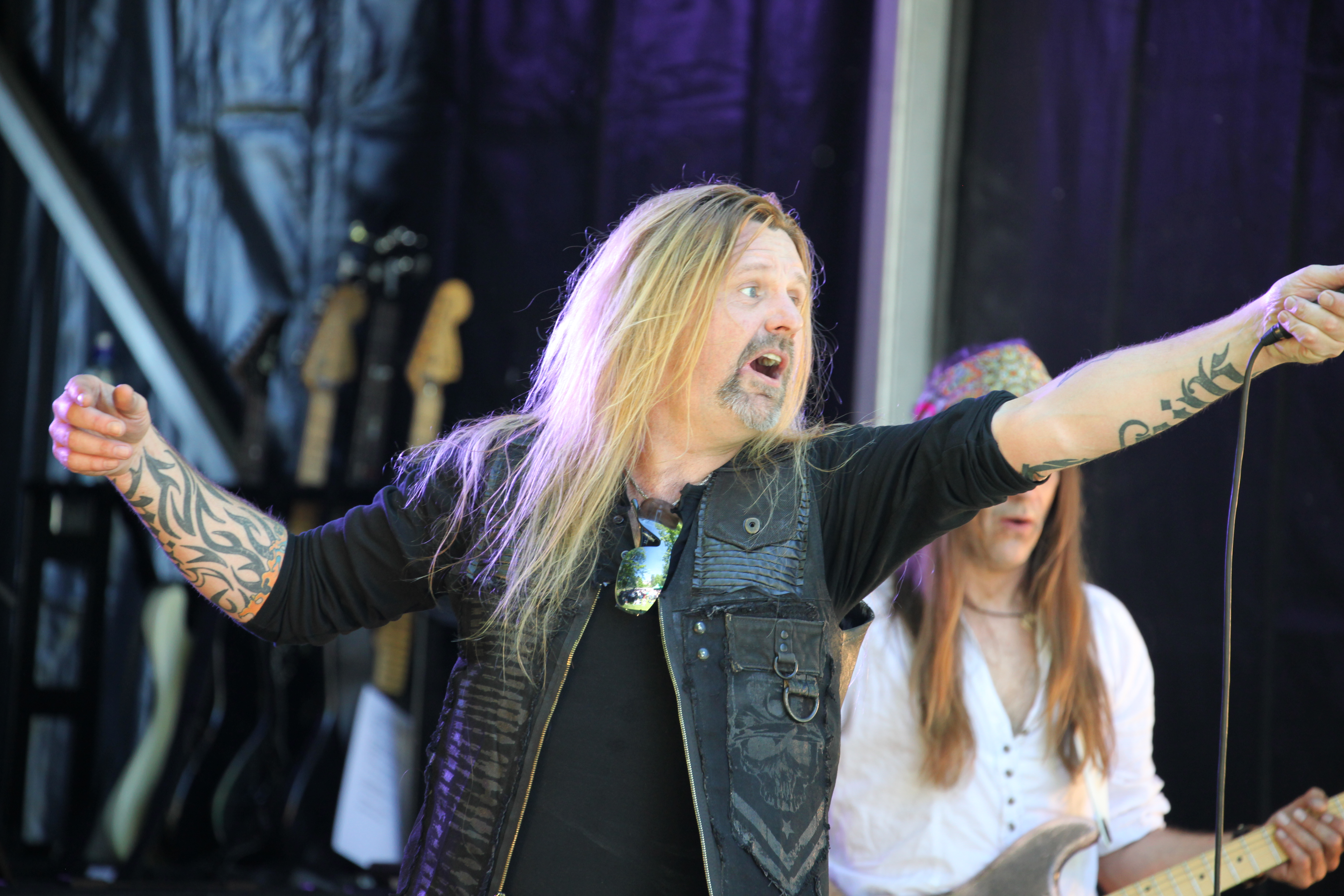
Tony Mills in 2012

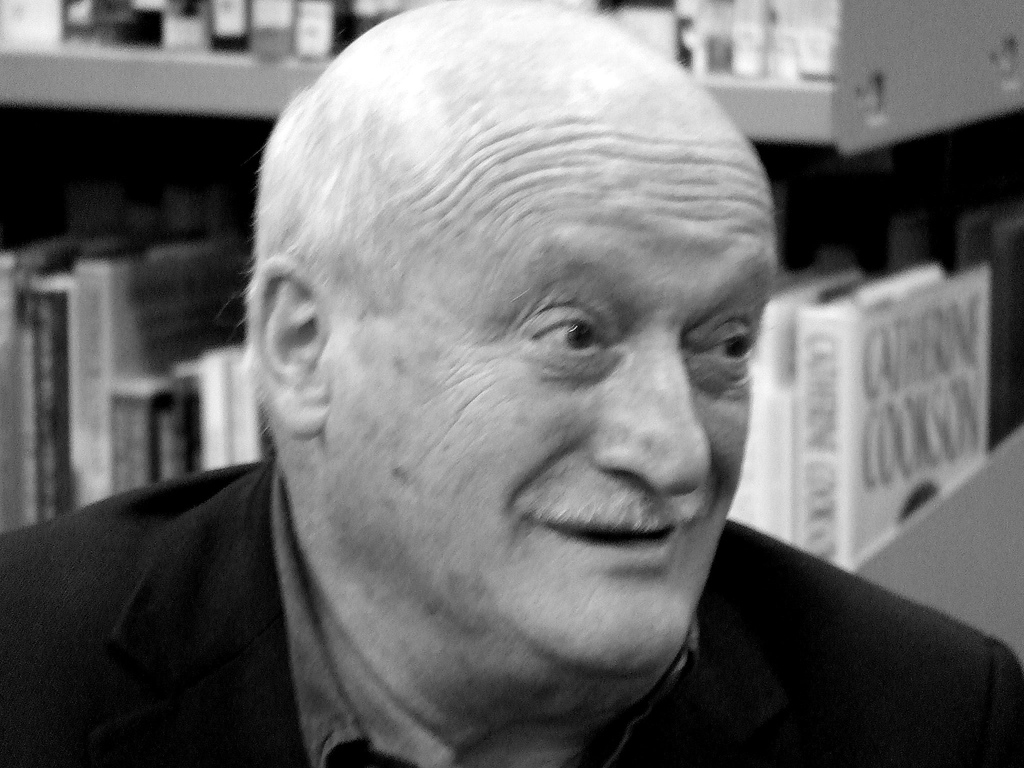
Al Alvarez in 2006

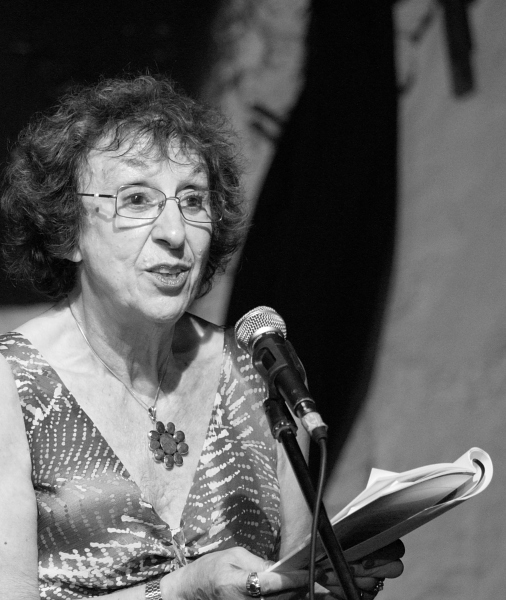
Elaine Feinstein in 2010

- 1 September – Ciaran McKeown, 76, Northern Irish peace activist.
- 2 September – Michael Beddow, 72, academic.
- 4 September
  - Sir Hugh Beach, 96, British Army general.
  - Jamie Janson, 43, aid worker and militant, suicide.
  - Kenny Mitchell, 62, English footballer (Newcastle United).
- 7 September – Peter Nichols, 92, English playwright (A Day in the Death of Joe Egg, Passion Play, Poppy).
- 8 September
  - Marjorie Blamey, 101, English painter and illustrator.
  - Sir Chris Dobson, 69, chemist, Master of St John's College, Cambridge (since 2007), cancer.
- 9 September – Brian Barnes, 74, Scottish golfer, cancer.
- 10 September – Valerie Van Ost, 75, English actress (Carry On, The Beauty Jungle, Mister Ten Per Cent).
- 12 September
  - Sir Norman Browse, 87, surgeon, President of the States of Alderney (2002–2011).
  - Sir Hugh Cunningham, 97, military officer, Deputy Chief of the Defence Staff (1976–1978).
  - Keith Robbins, 79, historian and vice-chancellor of University of Wales, Lampeter (1992–2003).
- 13 September
  - Magdalen Berns, 36, Scottish YouTuber, glioblastoma.
  - Cynthia Cockburn, 85, feminist and peace activist.
  - Dennis Edwards, 82, English footballer (Slough Town, Wycombe Wanderers, Charlton Athletic, Portsmouth).
  - Frank Key, 60, writer.
- 14 September
  - Jean Heywood, 98, British actress (When the Boat Comes In, Our Day Out, Billy Elliot)
  - Julian Piper, 72, English blues guitarist.
- 15 September – Sir Michael Edwardes, 88, British-South African businessman, Chairman of British Leyland (1977–1982) and International Computers Limited (1984).
- 16 September
  - Leah Bracknell, 55, English actress (Emmerdale, Doctors, The Royal Today)
  - Sir Toby Clarke, 80, businessman.
  - Sir Donald Gosling, 90, vice admiral and businessman, Chairman of National Car Parks (1959–1998).
  - Bobby Prentice, 65, Scottish footballer (Heart of Midlothian, Toronto Blizzard).
- 17 September – Roy Williamson, 86, Anglican cleric, Bishop of Southwark (1991–1998).
- 18 September
  - Lady Anne Berry, 99, English-New Zealand horticulturist, founder of Rosemoor Garden.
  - Tony Mills, 57, English rock singer (Shy, TNT), pancreatic cancer.
- 19 September
  - Larry Wallis, 70, English musician (Pink Fairies, Motörhead).
  - Henry Woods, 95, army officer.
- 20 September
  - Myles Burnyeat, 80, English philosopher and scholar.
  - Diarmuid Lawrence, 71, English television director (The Hanging Gale, Little Dorrit, Peter and Wendy)
- 23 September
  - Al Alvarez, 90, English poet (The New Poetry) and writer (The Biggest Game in Town), pneumonia.
  - Elaine Feinstein, 88, English poet and writer.
- 25 September
  - Donald Nicholls, Baron Nicholls of Birkenhead, 86, jurist, Lord of Appeal in Ordinary (1994–2007).
  - Sir John Wilsey, 80, military officer, Commander-in-Chief, Land Forces (1993–1996).
- 26 September – Peter Downsborough, 76, English footballer (Halifax Town, Swindon Town, Bradford City).
- 27 September – Russell Robins, 87, Welsh rugby union and rugby league player (Pontypridd, national team).
- 28 September – John Haylett, 74, journalist, editor of the Morning Star (1995–2009).
- 30 September – Sir David Akers-Jones, 92, politician, Chief Secretary for Administration (1985–1987) and acting Governor of Hong Kong (1986–1987), colon cancer.

=== October ===
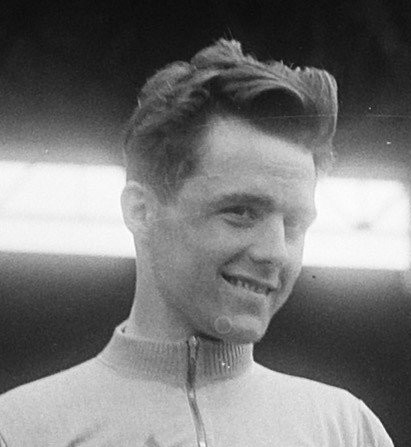
Tony Hoar in 1955

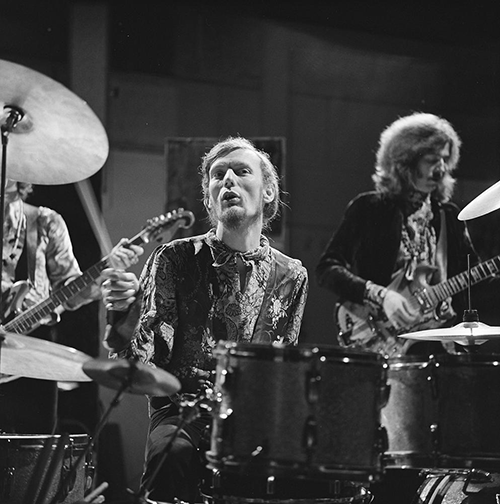
Ginger Baker in 1968

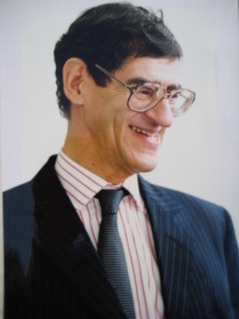
Sir John Boyd

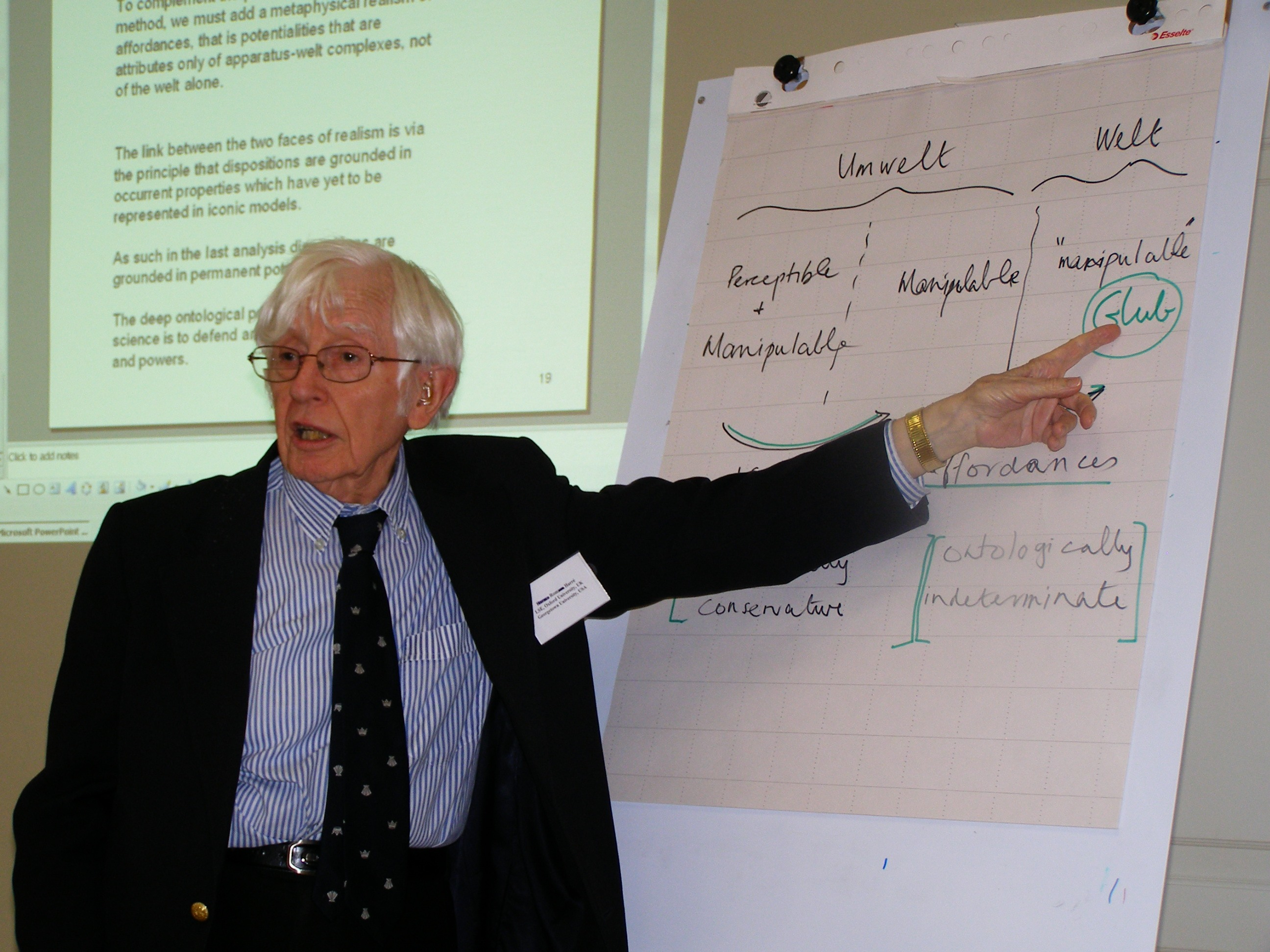
Horace Romano Harré in 2011

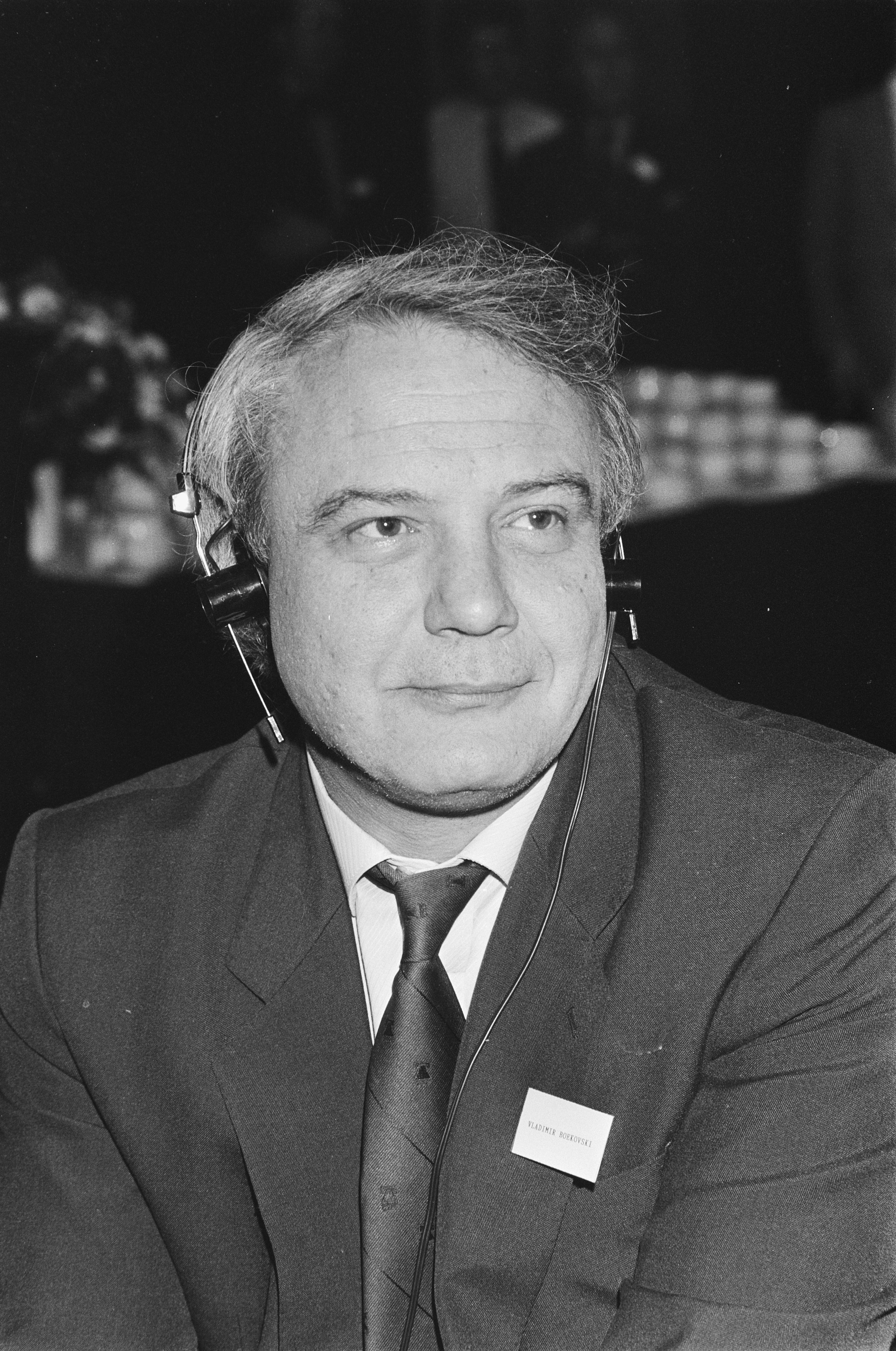
Vladimir Bukovsky in 1987

- 1 October
  - Fred Molyneux, 75, English footballer (Southport, Plymouth Argyle, Tranmere Rovers).
  - Peter Sissons, 77, English journalist and broadcaster (BBC News, ITN, Question Time).
- 4 October – Stephen Moore, 81, English actor (A Bridge Too Far, The Last Place on Earth, The Hitchhiker's Guide to the Galaxy).
- 5 October
  - Tony Hoar, 87, racing cyclist, cancer.
  - Sally Soames, 82, English photographer.
- 6 October
  - Ginger Baker, 80, English drummer (Cream, Blind Faith, Ginger Baker's Air Force).
  - Ciaran Carson, 70, Northern Irish poet.
- 7 October
  - Barry Jackson, 82, English rugby union player (Broughton Park, Lancashire, national team).
  - Tony Mulhearn, 80, political campaigner, lung disease.
- 8 October
  - Molly Duncan, 74, Scottish saxophonist (Average White Band), cancer.
  - Helen Shingler, 100, actress (Quiet Weekend, The Lady with a Lamp, Room in the House).
  - Split Waterman, 96, English speedway rider.
- 9 October – Éamonn Burns, 56, Northern Irish Gaelic footballer (Down).
- 10 October
  - Sir Desmond Cassidi, 94, admiral, Commander-in-Chief, Naval Home Command (1983–1984).
  - Juliette Kaplan, 80, English actress (Last of the Summer Wine, Coronation Street), cancer.
  - Stuart Taylor, 72, English footballer (Bristol Rovers)
- 12 October
  - James Hughes-Hallett, 70, businessman and investor.
  - Alison Prince, 88, children's writer.
  - Norman Schofield, 75, Scottish-American political scientist.
- 13 October – Richard Huckle, 33, convicted sex offender, stabbed.
- 14 October – Rosemary Harris, 96, English author (The Moon in the Cloud).
- 15 October – Andrew Cowan, 82, Scottish rally driver and team owner (Ralliart).
- 17 October – Michael Bowen, 89, Roman Catholic prelate, Archbishop of Southwark (1977–2003).
- 18 October
  - Sir John Boyd, 83, diplomat, Ambassador to Japan (1992–1996).
  - Horace Romano Harré, 91, New Zealand-born philosopher and psychologist.
- 19 October – Deborah Orr, 57, Scottish journalist (The Guardian, The Independent), breast cancer.
- 20 October
  - Sir Peter Graham, 85, lawyer and parliamentary draftsman, First Parliamentary Counsel (1991–1994).
  - Norman Myers, 85, environmentalist, dementia.
- 22 October – Raymond Leppard, 92, conductor, director of the Indianapolis Symphony Orchestra (1987–2001).
- 23 October
  - Duncan Forbes, 78, Scottish footballer (Colchester United, Norwich City), complications from Alzheimer's disease.
  - Brian Noble, 83, English Roman Catholic prelate, Bishop of Shrewsbury (1995–2010).
  - Francis Tresham, 83, game designer.
- 26 October – Jack Dunnett, 97, politician and football administrator, MP for Nottingham Central (1964–1974) and Nottingham East (1974–1983).
- 27 October
  - Vladimir Bukovsky, 76, Russian-born human rights activist and political dissident, heart attack.
  - Sir Malcolm Ross, 76, royal courtier, Master of the Household of the Prince of Wales (2006–2008).
- 28 October – Bert Mozley, 96, English footballer (Derby County, national team).
- 30 October
  - Russell Brookes, 74, rally driver, British Rally champion (1977, 1985).
  - Frank Giles, 100, English journalist and historian, editor of The Sunday Times (1981–1983).

=== November ===
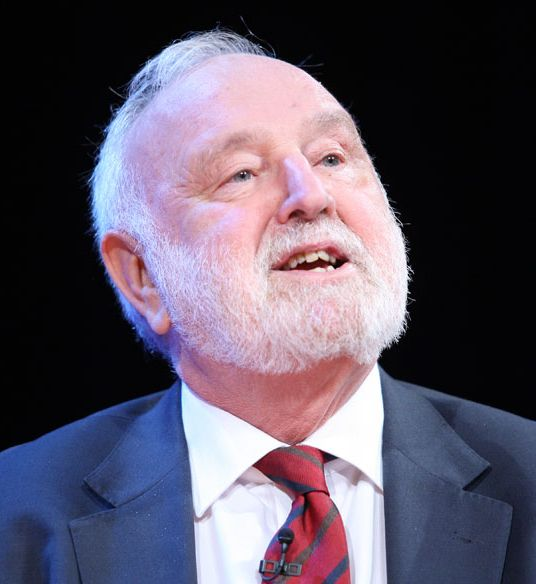
Frank Dobson in 2014

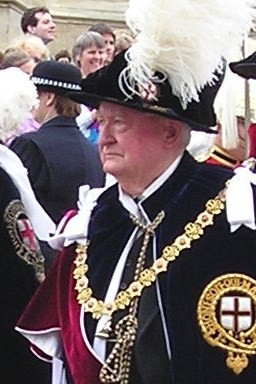
Edwin Bramall, Lord Bramall in 2006

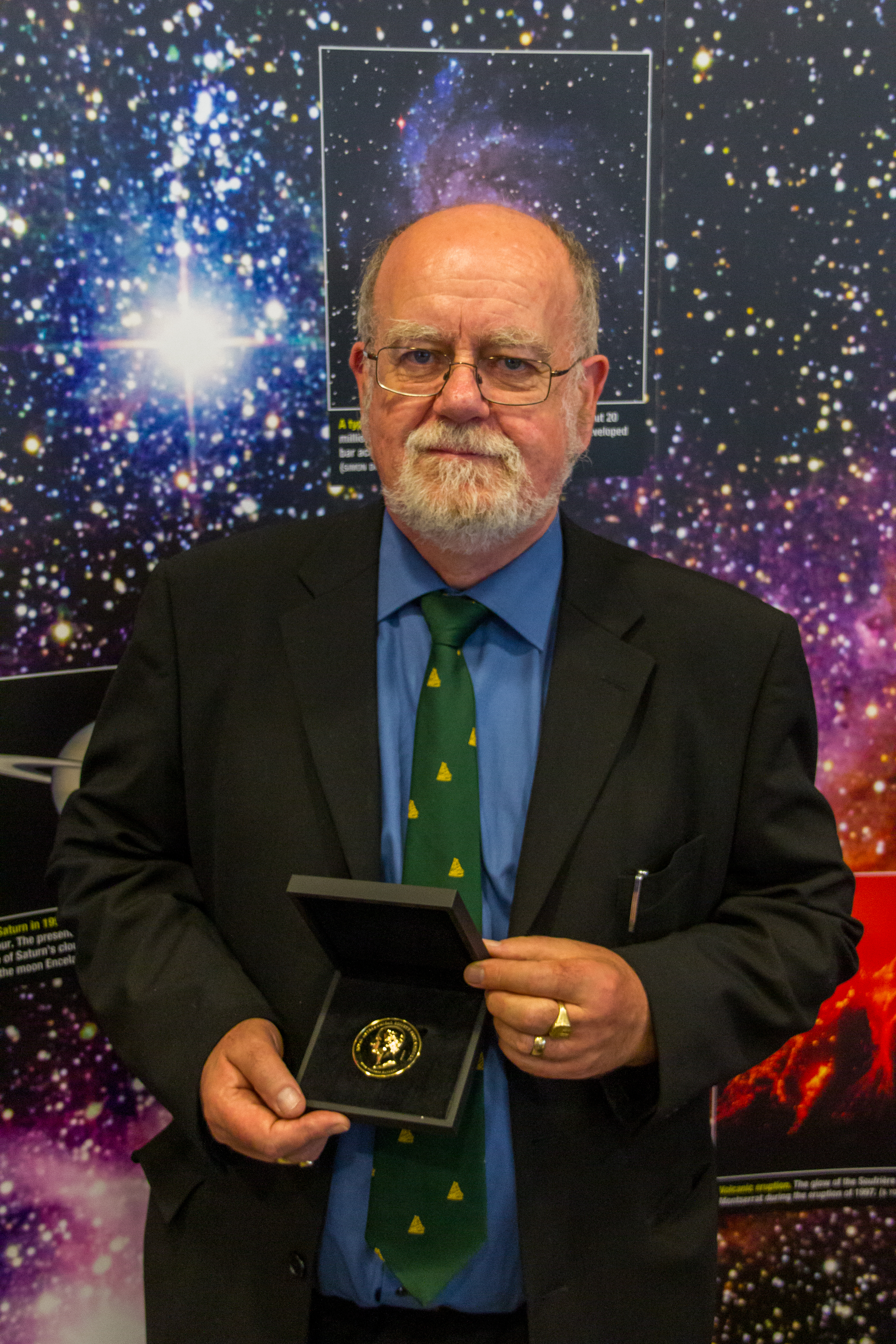
John Campbell Brown in 2012

Terry O'Neill in 2007

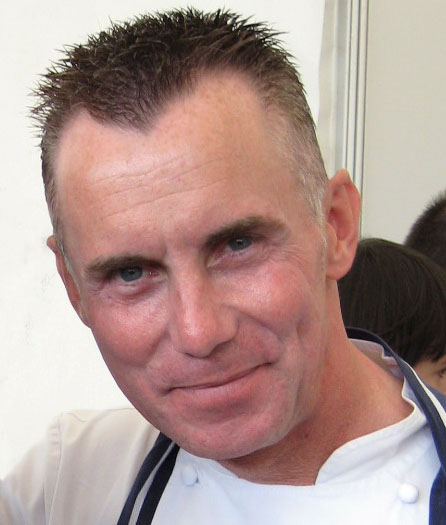
Gary Rhodes in 2008

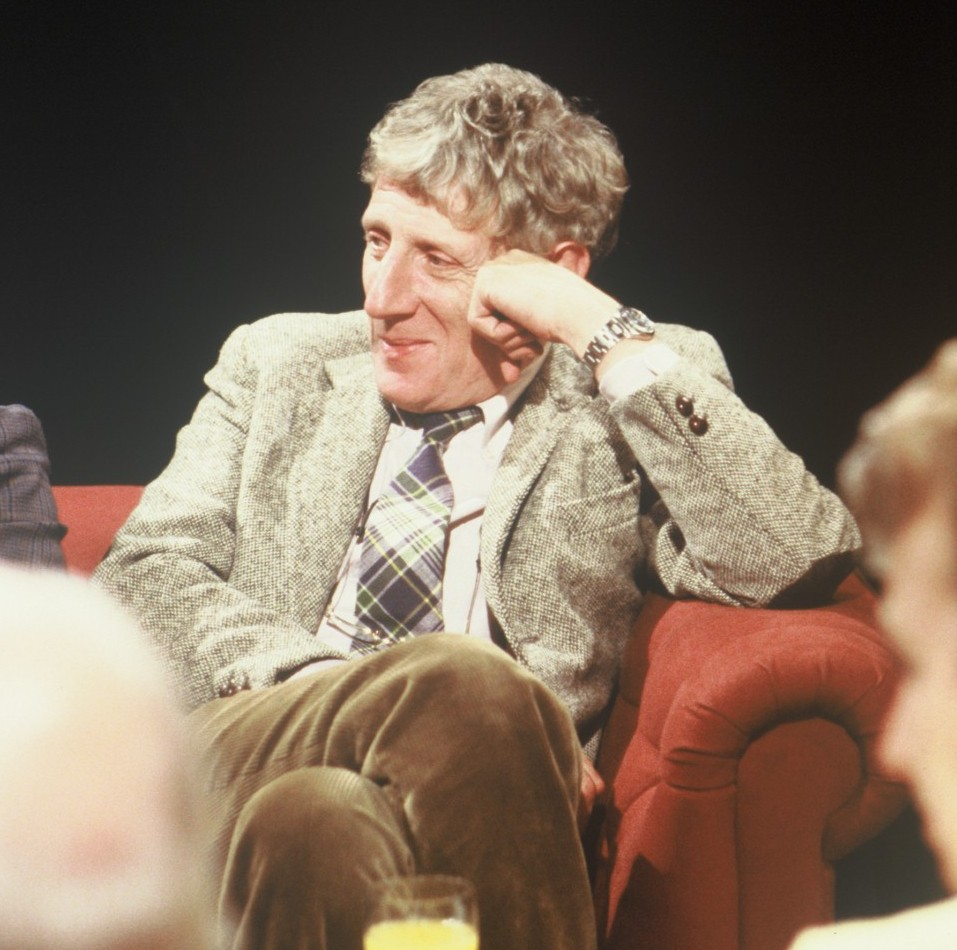
Jonathan Miller in 1988

- 1 November
  - Daniel Mullins, 90, Irish-born Welsh Roman Catholic prelate, Bishop of Menevia (1987–2001).
  - Archie Scott, 101, Scottish cricketer (national team).
  - Paul Turner, 73, Welsh film director (Hedd Wyn).
  - Hugh Waddell, 60, Scottish football league player.
- 4 November – Robert Smithies, 71, English-born Australian rugby league player (Hull Kingston Rovers, Balmain).
- 6 November
  - Tazeen Ahmad, 48, journalist and broadcaster, cancer.
  - Richard Lindley, 83, journalist and broadcaster.
- 7 November
  - Robert Freeman, 82, photographer (With the Beatles, A Hard Day's Night) and graphic designer.
  - Nik Powell, 69, film producer and record executive, co-founder of Virgin Records, Director of the National Film and Television School (2003–2017).
- 8 November – Annie Hall, 69, businesswoman and High Sheriff of Derbyshire (2017–2018) (drowned in the 2019 Yorkshire floods).
- 9 November
  - Brian Mawhinney, 79, Northern Irish politician, MP (1979–2005), Secretary of State for Health (1992–1994).
  - Cyril Robinson, 90, English footballer (Blackpool, Bradford Park Avenue, Southport).
- 10 November
  - Les Campbell, 84, English footballer (Preston North End, Blackpool, Tranmere Rovers).
  - Dennis Sorrell, 79, English footballer (Leyton Orient, Chelsea).
- 11 November
  - Edward Cullinan, 88, architect (Charles Cryer Theatre, Fountains Abbey, Weald and Downland Gridshell).
  - Frank Dobson, 79, British politician, MP (1979–2015), Secretary of State for Health (1997–1999).
  - James Le Mesurier, 48, Army officer and aid worker (White Helmets).
- 12 November
  - Edwin Bramall, Lord Bramall, 95, field marshal, Chief of the General Staff (1979–1982), Chief of the Defence Staff (1982–1985).
  - Ian Cullen, 80, actor (Z-Cars).
- 14 November – Jean Fergusson, 74, British actress (Last of the Summer Wine, Coronation Street).
- 16 November
  - John Campbell Brown, 72, Scottish astronomer, Astronomer Royal for Scotland (since 1995).
  - Terry O'Neill, 81, British photographer, prostate cancer.
  - Johnny Wheeler, 91, English footballer (England, Tranmere Rovers, Bolton Wanderers, Liverpool).
- 19 November
  - Basil Feldman, Baron Feldman, 96, businessman and life peer.
  - Lloyd Watson, 70, rock guitarist.
- 21 November – Colin Skipp, 80, actor (The Archers).
- 22 November
  - Sir Stephen Cleobury, 70, organist, Director of the Choir of King's College, Cambridge (since 1982).
  - Jasper Griffin, 82, classical scholar.
  - Chris Moncrieff, 88, journalist, political editor of the Press Association (1980–1994).
- 23 November
  - Leo Chamberlain, 79, priest and headmaster of Ampleforth College (1993–2003).
  - Olly Croft, 90, darts player and founder of the British Darts Organisation.
  - Sean Haslegrave, 68, English footballer (Stoke City, Nottingham Forest, Preston North End, Crewe Alexandra, York City, Torquay United).
- 24 November
  - Clive James, 80, Australian-born broadcaster and writer.
  - Colin Mawby, 83, English organist, choral conductor and composer.
- 25 November
  - Martin Harvey, 78, Northern Irish footballer (Northern Ireland, Sunderland).
  - Iain Sutherland, 71, Scottish musician (The Sutherland Brothers) and songwriter ("(I Don't Want to Love You But) You Got Me Anyway", "Arms of Mary").
- 26 November
  - Cyrus Chothia, 77, biochemist.
  - Gary Rhodes, 59, restaurateur and television chef.
- 27 November
  - Terry de Havilland, 81, shoe designer.
  - Sir Jonathan Miller, 85, humorist (Beyond the Fringe), actor and theatre director.
- 29 November
  - Tony Karalius, 76, English rugby league player (St Helens, Wigan, Great Britain).
  - Usman Khan, Islamic terrorist and perpetrator of the 2019 London Bridge stabbing
- 30 November
  - Sir Michael Howard, 97, historian, co-founder of the International Institute for Strategic Studies.
  - Brian Tierney, 97, historian and medievalist.

=== December ===
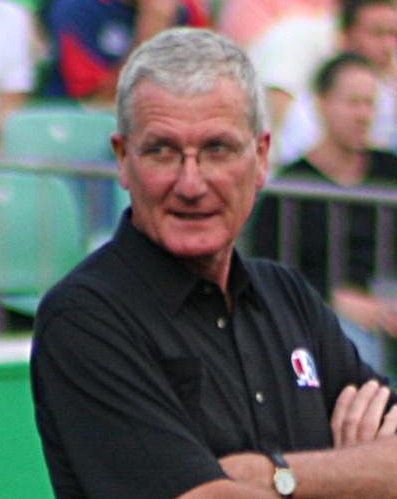
Bob Willis in 2007

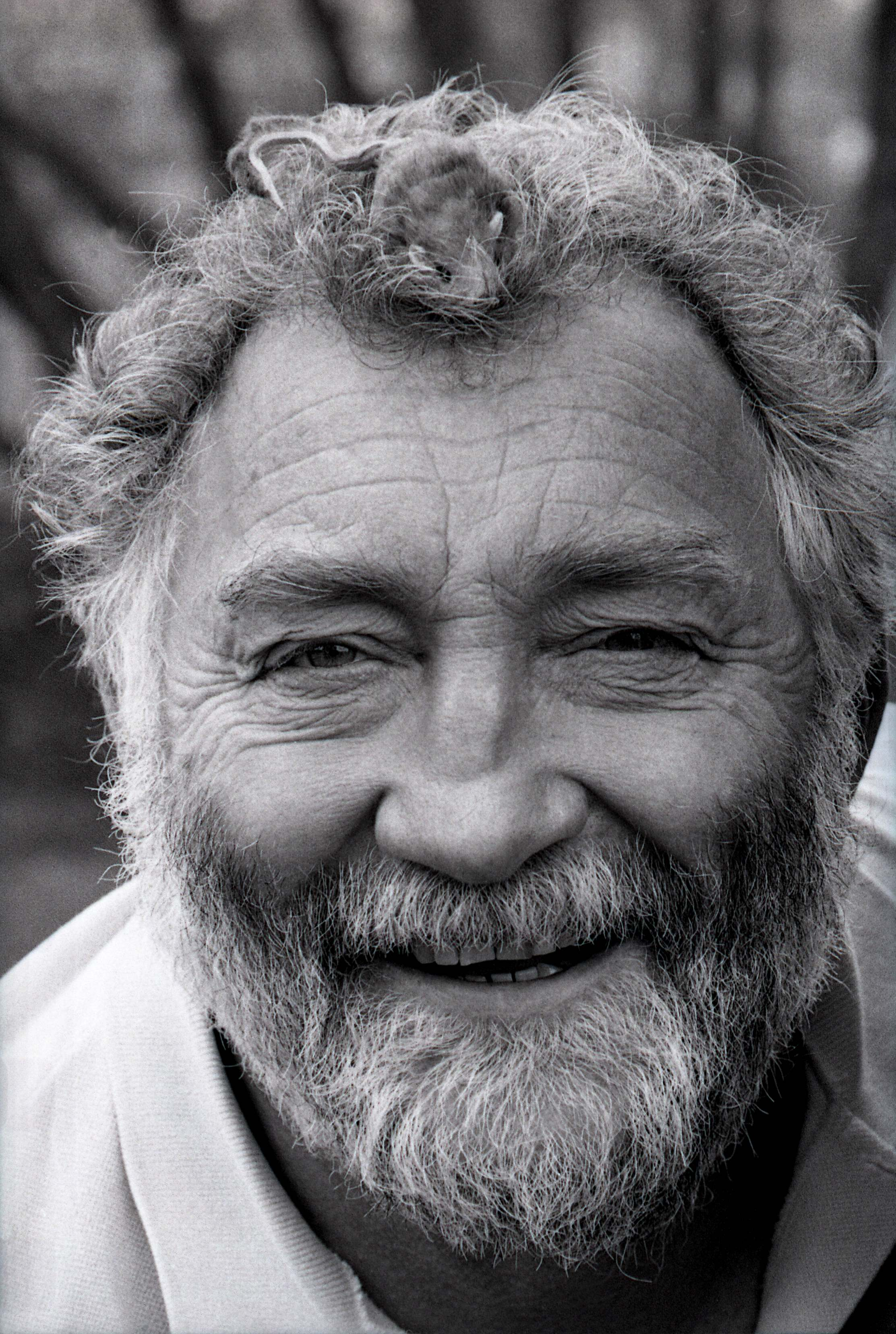
David Bellamy in 1981

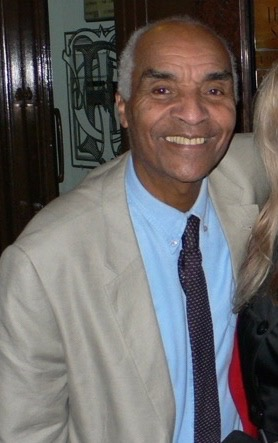
Kenny Lynch in 2010

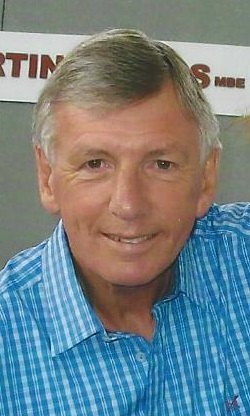
Martin Peters in 2007

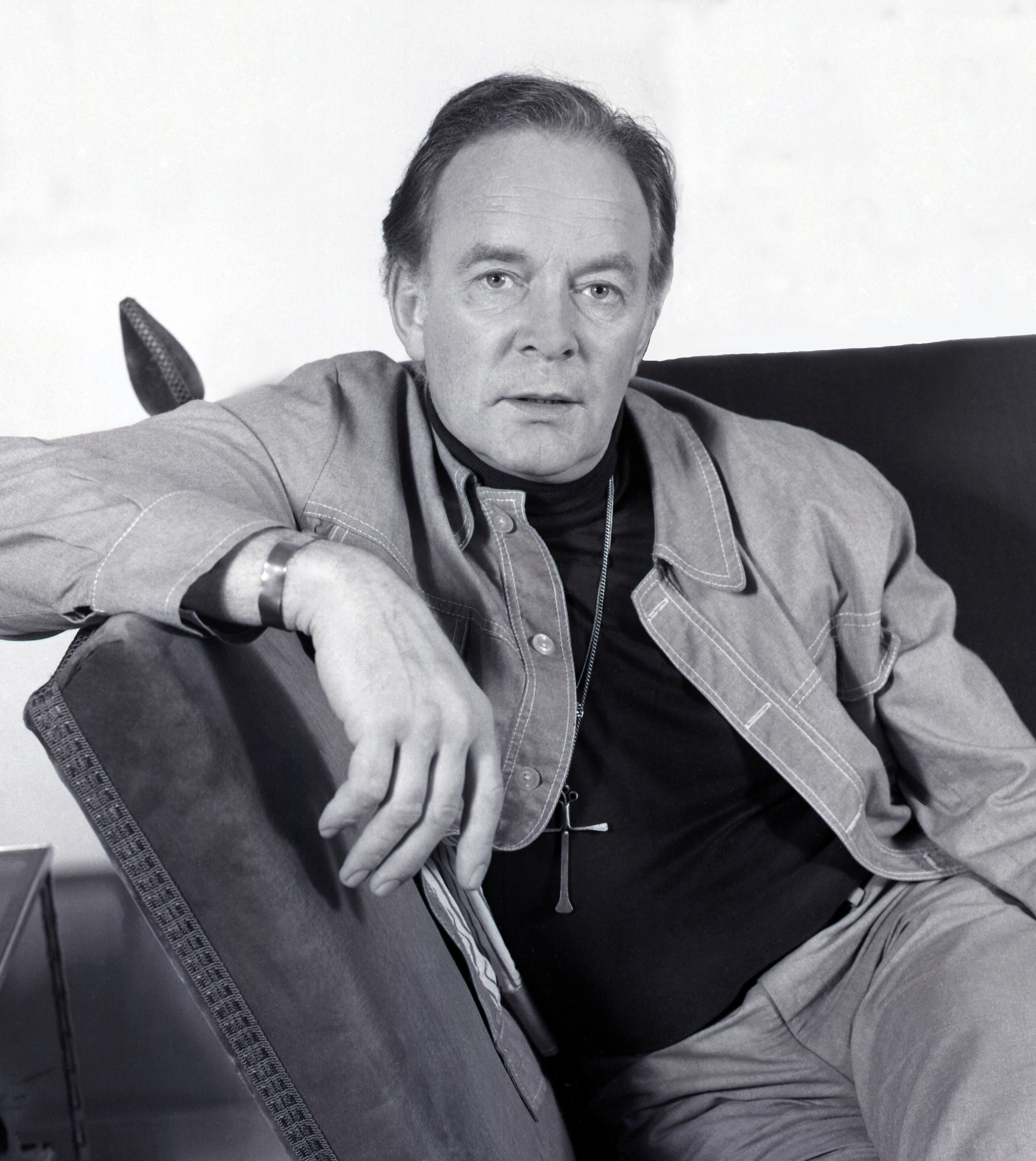
Tony Britton in 1972

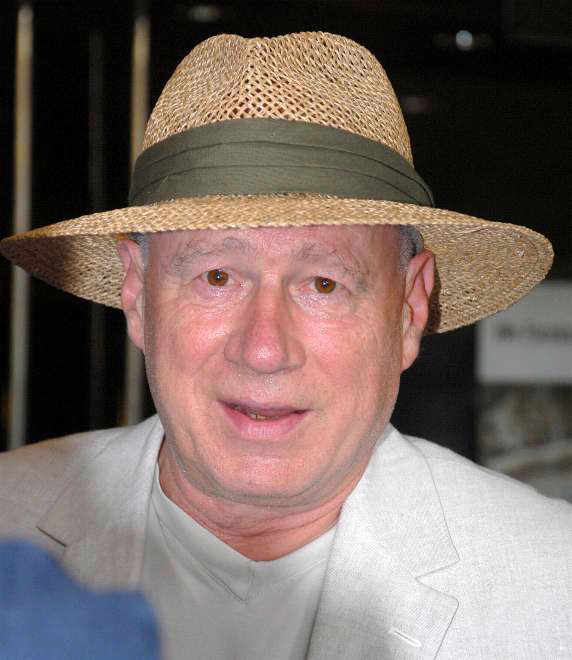
Neil Innes in 2009

- 2 December – Sir John Kerr, 82, Royal Navy admiral, Chief of Defence Intelligence (1988–1991), Commander-in-Chief, Naval Home Command (1992–1993).
- 3 December – Donald Tosh, 84, screenwriter (Doctor Who).
- 4 December
  - Sheila Mercier, 100, actress (Emmerdale).
  - Bob Willis, 70, English cricketer (Surrey, Warwickshire, national team).
- 6 December
  - Maurice Mounsdon, 101, Battle of Britain RAF pilot.
  - Michael Peacock, 90, television executive.
- 7 December
  - Kate Figes, 62, author.
  - Ron Saunders, 87, English footballer (Portsmouth) and football manager (Aston Villa, Birmingham City).
  - Simon Streatfeild, 90, violist and orchestral conductor.
- 8 December – Roy Cheetham, 79, English footballer (Manchester City).
- 9 December – Elizabeth Sutherland, 24th Countess of Sutherland, 98, Scottish noblewoman, chief of Clan Sutherland.
- 10 December
  - Natalie Harrowell, 29, English rugby league player (Featherstone Rovers, national team).
  - Barrie Keeffe, 74, screenwriter (The Long Good Friday).
  - Jim Smith, 79, English footballer (Boston United) and football manager (Portsmouth, Derby County, Queens Park Rangers).
- 11 December
  - David Bellamy, 86, naturalist, television presenter (Bellamy's Backyard Safari) and author.
  - Paul Crossley, 74, art historian.
  - Ann Elizabeth Wee, 93, social worker in Singapore.
  - Ian Young, 76, Scottish footballer (Celtic, St Mirren).
- 14 December – Lord Tim Hudson, 79, English DJ, voice actor (The Jungle Book), and agent (Ian Botham).
- 15 December
  - Nicky Henson, 74, actor (Fawlty Towers, EastEnders, Downton Abbey).
  - David Lambie, 94, politician and MP (1970–1992).
  - Sir Thomas Pearson, 105, Army general.
- 17 December
  - Tom Adams, 93, American-born Scottish illustrator.
  - Ron Hogg, 68, police officer, Durham Police and Crime Commissioner (since 2012), amyotrophic lateral sclerosis.
  - Cuchlaine King, 97, geomorphologist.
  - Tom White, 80, Scottish footballer (Hearts, Bury, Crystal Palace).
  - Peter Wollen, 81, film theorist and filmmaker.
- 18 December
  - Mary Cosh, 100, freelance journalist and local historian.
  - Kenny Lynch, 81, singer ("You Can Never Stop Me Loving You"), actor (Carry On Loving, The Playbirds) and entertainer.
- 20 December
  - Frank Foster, 79, English rugby league player.
  - Billy Hughes, 70, Scottish footballer (Sunderland, Leicester City, national team).
  - Bashir Maan, 93, Pakistani-British politician.
- 21 December
  - Ronald Bowlby, 93, Anglican prelate, Bishop of Southwark (1980–1991).
  - Leslie Brent, 94, German-born immunologist and zoologist.
  - Martin Peters, 76, English footballer (West Ham United, Norwich City, national team) and football manager, World Cup winner (1966).
- 22 December
  - Tony Britton, 95, actor (Operation Amsterdam, Sunday Bloody Sunday, The Day of the Jackal).
  - Sidney Holt, 93, marine biologist.
  - Billy Slade, 78, Welsh cricketer (Glamorgan).
  - Gary Talbot, 82, British footballer (Chester, Crewe Alexandra, Drumcondra).
- 23 December – Alan Harrington, 86, Welsh footballer (Cardiff City, national team).
- 24 December – Andrew Miller, 70, politician, MP (1992–2015).
- 25 December
  - Martyn King, 82, English footballer (Colchester United, Wrexham).
  - Duncan MacKay, 82, Scottish footballer (Celtic, Perth, national team).
  - Johnny Matthews, 73, English footballer (Waterford, Limerick) and football manager (Newcastlewest).
- 28 December – Robert Baden-Powell, 3rd Baron Baden-Powell, 83, Scouting leader.
- 29 December
  - Alasdair Gray, 85, Scottish writer (Lanark) and artist.
  - Neil Innes, 75, writer, comedian (Monty Python) and musician (The Rutles, Bonzo Dog Doo-Dah Band, Grimms).
  - Vaughan Oliver, 62, graphic designer (4AD).
  - John Shuker, 77, British footballer (Oxford United).
- 30 December
  - Micky Block, 79, English footballer (Chelsea).
  - Marion Chesney, 83, Scottish novelist (Death of a Gossip, Death of an Outsider, Agatha Raisin and the Deadly Dance).
  - Elizabeth Sellars, 98, Scottish actress (The Barefoot Contessa, 55 Days at Peking, The Webster Boy).
  - Charles Williams, Baron Williams of Elvel, 86, cricketer (Essex, Oxford University) and business executive, member of the House of Lords (1985–2019).
  - Johnny Ward, 78, English rugby league footballer who played in the 1950s, 1960s and 1970s.
- 31 December
  - Andrew Hughes Hallett, 72, British economist.
  - Basil Watts, 93, English rugby league player (York Wasps, England national team, Great Britain national team), world champion (1954).

== See also ==
- 2019
- 2019 in British music
- 2019 in British radio
- 2019 in British television
- List of British films of 2019
