= 1988 in British television =

This is a list of British television related events from 1988.

== Events ==
=== January ===
- 1 January
  - New Year's Day highlights on BBC1 include the network television premiere of Roger Donaldson's 1984 historical drama The Bounty, starring Mel Gibson and Anthony Hopkins.
  - BBC2 airs a five-hour Whistle Test special to welcome in 1988 which aired from 9:35pm on New Year's Eve to 2:55am on New Year's Day. The special takes a look back through the archives in what is the programme's final outing. It will be three decades later in 2018 before a new edition of the programme is broadcast.
  - Michael Grade takes on the role of Chief Executive of Channel 4.
  - From today, each programme on ITV is no longer preceded by the identifier of the regional company that had produced the show.
- 4 January – BBC1 moves the repeat episode of Neighbours to a 5:35pm evening slot, the decision to do this having been made by controller Michael Grade on the advice of his daughter.
- 5 January – Actor Rowan Atkinson launches the new Comic Relief charity appeal.
- 6 January – All ITV regions begin to broadcast Emmerdale Farm in the Wednesday and Thursday 6:30pm slot.
- 8 January
  - BBC1 the network television premiere of the hit 1984 musical drama film Footloose, starring Kevin Bacon.
  - Launch of LWT News, a news service from London Weekend Television providing at least eight bulletins each weekend for the ITV London region and created as a response to IBA concerns about the lack of a proper news service in London at weekends.
- 9 January
  - ITV's weekend morning children's programme No. 73 is rebranded as 7T3.
- 11 January
  - The US animated series The Real Ghostbusters, based on the hit 1984 Ghostbusters movie makes its UK debut on Children's ITV.
  - Debut of the game show Fifteen to One on Channel 4, presented by William G. Stewart. The show's first winner is Gareth McMullan, a teacher from Northern Ireland.
- 14 January – Talks between TV-am's management and the ACTT union begin, aiming to resolve the ongoing strike.
- 25 January – TVS launches Late Night Late and gradually extends its broadcast hours over the next few months.
- 25–29 January – TV-am airs a week of live broadcasts from Sydney to celebrate Australia's bicentenary and featuring Anne Diamond and Mike Morris.
- 30 January – The network television premiere of the 1983 James Bond film Octopussy on ITV, starring Roger Moore.

=== February ===
- 1 February
  - TV-am celebrates its fifth birthday, with Anne Diamond being joined by Richard Keys, Gyles Brandreth, Su Pollard and Jimmy Greaves. It is the first time it has been able to get its daily output down to an hour of pre-recorded material since the beginning of the strike. However, the station continues to air imports of old US shows for several months.
  - The deadline on which the ACTT must accept TV-am's "Ten Point Plan" aimed at resolving the strike. However, the plan is rejected by a ballot and the union refuses to resume negotiations.
- 5 February – The inaugural Red Nose Day sees Comic Relief air its first live fundraiser on BBC1. Hosted by Lenny Henry and Griff Rhys Jones, "A Night of Comic Relief" would go on to raise £15 million for the charity.
- 9 February – MPs vote in favour of allowing television cameras into the House of Commons.
- 10 February – Debut of Moondial, a six-part series adapted from the novel by Helen Cresswell on BBC1. The series is repeated by BBC1 in 1990.
- 13 February
  - Scottish and Granada begin 24-hour broadcasting.
  - Central, which has been keeping its transmitters on the air since last April by filling its closedown period with its Jobfinder service, launches a full overnight schedule. Jobfinder also launches on both Granada and Scottish and all three companies broadcast Jobfinder for one hour beginning at 4am.
- 13–28 February – The 1988 Winter Olympics are held in Calgary, Alberta, Canada. The BBC provides British coverage of the event.
- 15 February
  - Channel 4 starts broadcasting into the early hours, closing down between 2am and 3am. Previously, Channel 4 has closed down at just after midnight.
  - An early morning 60-minute news programme, ITN Early Morning News, is launched but is available in areas which have 24-hour broadcasting only. The first 30 minutes of the programme includes a full broadcast of ITN's international news bulletin ITN World News. The new bulletin is supplemented by the launch of additional, brief news summaries which are broadcast at various points through the night.
  - The cult science-fiction comedy series Red Dwarf makes its debut on BBC2, starring Chris Barrie, Craig Charles and Danny John-Jules.
- 16 February – TV-am Managing Director Bruce Gyngell sacks the station's locked out staff and calls a meeting of its remaining employees the following morning to announce that the ACTT will never again organise itself at TV-am's studios. His decision fails to resolve the crisis, however, as picketing continues and the quality of its output remains unchanged.
- 17 February – Debut of five-part crime drama The Fear on ITV, starring Iain Glen, Susannah Harker, Anthony Valentine, Jesse Birdsall, Jerome Flynn and Adrian Dunbar. It focuses on the story of Carl Galton, the enterprising leader of a criminal gang running a protection racket in North London who represents a new breed seeking to expand his underworld empire and take on the old East End firms. The series continues on 16 March.
- 19 February – The popular comedy and music show Friday Night Live returns to Channel 4 (with a change of title from Saturday Live), and again featuring comedians Ben Elton and Harry Enfield.
- 20 February
  - Debut of the stunt-based game show You Bet! on ITV, presented by Bruce Forsyth.
  - London's Burning makes its debut as a regular series on ITV, having been developed from Jack Rosenthal's original 1986 film.
- February – British Medical Television is officially launched, ahead of it commencing broadcasting later in the year as a subscription service airing during BBC1's overnight closedown period.

=== March ===
- 3 March – BBC1 airs Around the World with Willy Fog with former CBBC and Broom Cupboard presenter Andy Crane singing the theme tune. A special event called "National Willy Fog Day" which Crane invented will also appear on 28 April to air the final episode and celebrate the final broadcast.
- 7 March – ITV's lunchtime news programme returns to the 1pm timeslot.
- 11 March – The final episode of the long-running children's series Play School is broadcast on BBC1, although repeats will continue until October.
- 18 March – The final US edition of Top of the Pops is broadcast.
- 19 March – Corporals killings: Two British soldiers in civilian dress are killed after stumbling into an IRA funeral procession in Belfast. Footage of the incident is captured by journalists and widely broadcast.
- 21 March – Anglia's silver statue of a knight on horseback ident is consigned to history, having been used as Anglia's identity since the station went on the air 29 years earlier. It is replaced by a new identity, a quasi-heraldic stylised 'A' made of triangles, designed by Robinson Lambie-Nairn at a cost of £500,000. About Anglia is also given a new look to coincide with the ident change.
- 22 March – Prime Minister Margaret Thatcher tells the House of Commons that journalists have a "bounden duty" to assist the police investigation into the Corporals killings by handing over their footage. Many have refused to do so fearing it could place them in danger.
- 23 March – Film of the Corporals killings is seized from the BBC and ITN under the Prevention of Terrorism and Emergency Provisions Acts.
- 25 March
  - BBC2 shows Two of Us, a gay-themed television film. It has been produced as part of the BBC Schools Scene programme and is intended for young adults. It confronts the Thatcherite government's attempt to prohibit gay sex education in schools via the controversial and subsequently repealed section 28 legislation. Given this backdrop, the BBC opts not to show it during the day and it is screened late at night on this day, even though originally created for a school audience. In 1990, the play is finally shown during the day, when it is broadcast in a lunchtime slot.
  - Former MP John Stonehouse collapses on set during an edition of Central Weekend in Birmingham during the filming of a programme about missing people. He is given emergency medical treatment at the studio and taken to hospital, where he is diagnosed as having suffered from a minor heart attack, but will die at home three weeks later.
- 27 March – The final edition of children's programme 7T3 is broadcast on ITV.
- 31 March – Daphne Hudson wins the first series of the BBC's quiz show Going for Gold, and is awarded the prize of tickets to the 1988 Summer Olympics in Seoul.

=== April ===
- 1 April – The network television premiere of the Rankin/Bass animated film The Flight of Dragons on BBC1.
- 3 April – BBC1 airs the first terrestrial television showing of A Passage to India, David Lean's 1984 epic drama based on E. M. Forster's 1924 novel and Santha Rama Rau's 1960 play of the same name which stars Judy Davis, Peggy Ashcroft, Victor Banerjee, James Fox, Alec Guinness, Nigel Havers and Art Malik.
- 4 April
  - The original series of Crossroads airs for the last time on ITV. It returns in 2001 before being axed again in 2003.
  - The network television premiere of Terry Gilliam's 1985 dystopian dark comedy Brazil on BBC2, starring Jonathan Pryce, Robert De Niro, Kim Greist, Michael Palin, Katherine Helmond, Bob Hoskins and Ian Holm.
- 6 April – ITV's chart show The Roxy airs for the last time; that same day, Children's ITV begins re-airing Thomas & Friends Season 2.
- 7 April – Ireland has purchased the Welsh children's stop-motion animated series Fireman Sam for television broadcasting there. The show will debut on RTÉ1 with the first series only, and will return to air a number of times on RTÉ2, known at this time as Network 2, although viewers in Ireland with access to British television are able to see earlier transmissions including all four series and the Christmas special with their original airdates.
- 10 April – Debut of East of the Moon on Channel 4, a new series for children based on fairy tales written by former Monty Python member Terry Jones brought to life with live-action and animation and songs written and performed by Neil Innes.
- 15 April – The Pogues perform their controversial hit "Streets of Sorrow/Birmingham Six", a song expressing support for those convicted over the Guildford and Birmingham pub bombings on the Ben Elton-presented Channel 4 show Friday Night Live. The song is cut short, however, by a commercial break.
- 19 April – Liz Forgan becomes Channel 4's first official Director of Programmes.
- 23 April-10 September – Two new Saturday morning magazine series are shown this Summer: On the Waterfront is aired for the first part of the season with UP2U taking over in mid-July. The same two shows are also shown the following Summer.
- 28 April
  - BBC1 airs the concluding episode of Around the World with Willy Fog.
  - ITV broadcasts "Death on the Rock", a hugely controversial episode of Thames's This Week current affairs strand, investigating Operation Flavius which resulted in the SAS killing three members of the IRA in Gibraltar on 6 March. The programme is later considered as a contributing factor towards the introduction of the Broadcasting Act 1990 by Margaret Thatcher and Thames subsequently losing its ITV franchise in 1991.
- 30 April – Canadian singer Celine Dion wins the 1988 Eurovision Song Contest (staged in Dublin) for Switzerland with the French language song "Ne partez pas sans moi" (Don't Leave Without Me). The United Kingdom entry, "Go", performed by Scott Fitzgerald and written by Julie Forsyth, daughter of entertainer Bruce Forsyth, finishes just one point behind as runner-up.

=== May ===
- 8 May – Debut of the cult movie series Moviedrome on BBC2, hosted by film director Alex Cox. The first edition shows Robin Hardy's 1973 folk horror classic The Wicker Man, starring Edward Woodward and Christopher Lee.
- 9 May – The youth strand DEF II is launched on BBC2.
- 18 May – Channel 4 shows the network television premiere of Rob Reiner's 1984 cult music comedy film This Is Spinal Tap, starring Christopher Guest, Michael McKean and Harry Shearer.
- 19 May – Anita Dobson makes her last appearance in EastEnders when her character, Angie Watts, departs for a new life in Spain.
- 23 May – Three gay rights activists invade the BBC studios during this day's Six O'Clock News bulletin on BBC1 to protest about the introduction of Section 28, a law preventing schools from teaching their students about homosexuality. Protesters are heard chanting as Sue Lawley continues to read the news, prompting her to comment "we have been rather invaded by some people who we hope to be removing very shortly".
- 27 May – Almost all of the production areas at the BBC Television Centre are shut down after the discovery of asbestos fibres in the soundproof ceiling of TC5 during routine maintenance. It is also found in the coating of trusses supporting the studio grids. As a consequence, production teams are required to move from Television Centre to other BBC studios, such as Bristol and Birmingham. Work to remove the asbestos takes several months.
- 29–30 May – ITV stages its first Telethon, a 27-hour nationwide fundraising effort involving participation and input from all of the regional broadcasters around the country. Its aim is to raise money for disability charities across the UK.
- 30 May
  - Yorkshire Television resumes 24-hour broadcasting.
  - TV-am does not go on the air, with its airtime instead taken up by coverage of ITV's Telethon '88. The ACTT had asked its members to boycott the programme on this day and fearful of sparking a nationwide dispute, TV-am's acting Managing Director, Adrian Moore, allows ITV to use the early morning airtime.
- 31 May
  - Debut of People, a thirteen-part series on BBC1 featuring human interest stories, which is presented by Derek Jameson. He is joined by Jeni Barnett, Lucy Pilkington and Chris Serle.
  - Debut of Charles Wood's screenplay Tumbledown on BBC1, about the experiences of Scots Guard Robert Lawrence who was left paralysed after being shot in the head by a sniper at the Battle of Mount Tumbledown during the Falklands War. The film is shown again on 9 October.

=== June ===
- 1 June – Live horse racing is shown for the final time on ITV when it simulcasts Channel 4's coverage of the 1988 Epsom Derby. The sport will to return to ITV in 2017.
- 5 June – Channel 4 airs the Thames documentary Waldheim: A Commission of Inquiry, a programme investigating the history of the alleged Nazi conspirator Kurt Waldheim.
- 6 June – Yorkshire Television begins transmitting the Australian soap opera The Young Doctors. However, in order to catch up with its neighbouring region Tyne Tees Television, Yorkshire will have to skip at least 215 episodes.
- 8 June
  - Presenter Russell Harty dies at the age of 53.
  - Media mogul Rupert Murdoch announces to the British Academy of Film and Television Arts his intention to launch a four-channel service on the soon to be launched Astra satellite.
- 11 June – The Nelson Mandela 70th Birthday Tribute concert is staged at Wembley Stadium, London and is broadcast on BBC2.
- 13 June – Presenter Frank Bough leaves the BBC after a News of the World exposé of his private life.
- 20 June – TVS and Channel Television commence 24-hour broadcasting.
- 21 June – BBC1 airs Crystal Clear, a film based on the award-winning play of the same name that deals with the subject of sight loss.

=== July ===
- 1 July – The Australian series The Flying Doctors makes its UK debut on BBC1. Initially airing on Fridays at 8:10pm, from 20 August, it is moved to a Saturday early evening slot.
- 4 July – Miami Vice returns to BBC1 after 10 months; however, owing to controversies over violence and drug use, several of the episodes are not shown on the BBC, including one featuring a sympathetic IRA member played by Liam Neeson, and another which sees the death of a key character, "Larry" Zito, played by John Diehl.
- 7 July – The Times reports that TVS have bought US production company MTM Enterprises for £190m.
- 15 July – London Weekend Television airs the final edition of its Friday evening programme The Six O'Clock Show. It is replaced by Friday Now!, a smaller scale current affairs programme from October.
- 17 July – After 1,576 episodes, Farming is broadcast on BBC1 for the final time. It is replaced the following week by Countryfile whose brief is to look at issues reflecting all aspects of the countryside rather than just focussing on farming.
- 19 July
  - The Bill broadcasts the first episode of its fourth series and switches to a year-round serial format.
  - Debut of the UK version of the game show Wheel of Fortune on ITV, presented by Nicky Campbell with Angela Ekaette.
- 26 July – Anna Wing makes her final appearance as EastEnders matriarch Lou Beale, dispensing words of wisdom and advice to her family before retiring to her bedroom to slip away. Her final words in the soap are: "That's you lot sorted. I can go now." The character has died by the following episode and at her funeral, her on-screen son Pete (Peter Dean) proposes a toast to that "bloody old bag". Wing herself will die, at the age of 98, in 2013.
- July – Stephen Barden is appointed as TV-am's new Managing Editor. With the station facing criticism from the IBA over the quality of its output, he acts quickly to improve matters. Repeats of imported US programmes finally come to an end, while new programming is launches and programmes such as Frost on Sunday, off air since the strike began, are restored.

=== August ===
- 3 August – Brookside is moved from Tuesdays to Wednesdays which means the soap can now be seen on Mondays and Wednesdays.
- 4 August – The band All About Eve perform their single "Martha's Harbour" on Top of the Pops. The group, ready to do a mimed (as is BBC policy at this time) performance of their hit, are not played the backing track through their monitors and they sit motionless while the television and studio audience hear the song. Due to this error on the part of the BBC, the band are invited back the following week and insist on playing the song live.
- 5 August
  - The eight-part New Zealand thriller Steel Riders makes its debut on BBC1.
  - Channel 4 debuts the Jonathan Ross presented documentary series on B-Movies, The Incredibly Strange Film Show.
- 10 August – Debut of Crimewatch File, a BBC1 documentary series in which detectives tell the inside stories of some of the UK's major criminal investigations during which they appeal to viewers for help.
- 19 August – Following concerns about the quality of TV-am's programming, an emergency meeting of the IBA considers whether to review the station's franchise in early 1989. However, it is ultimately decided not to proceed with the review since the next franchise round is approaching and the IBA feels the success of both organisations is mutually exclusive.
- 22 August – HTV begins 24-hour broadcasting.
- August – Weekly highlights of First Division matches in the 1988–89 season are shown on satellite and cable via Super Channel, doing so by relaying the Chrysalis Television produced English Soccer programme
- 31 August – ITV airs a version of The Hound of the Baskervilles, starring Jeremy Brett as Sherlock Holmes and Edward Hardwicke as Dr. Watson.

=== September ===
- 1 September – To celebrate BBC Radio 1's FM "switch on day", BBC1's Top of the Pops is simulcast with that station for the first time, allowing listeners to hear the programme in stereo. This edition is presented by Steve Wright and Mark Goodier. Top of the Pops is then simulcast weekly with Radio 1 until August 1991.
- 2 September – TSW, Grampian and Border begin 24-hour broadcasting as they take up Night Time, a new late night service launched that night, produced by Granada. Tyne Tees also takes up the service.
- 3 September
  - Motormouth launches as ITV's new Saturday morning children's programme.
  - First edition of The Noel Edmonds Saturday Roadshow in which Noel Edmonds did his first major TV project since the demise of The Late, Late Breakfast Show two years earlier. The series ran for three years and some segments on the show would later be featured and developed in Edmonds' later series Noel's House Party.
- 5 September
  - BBC's main evening news programme Wales Today moves to the 6:30pm timeslot.
  - BBC1 airs Bros Special, a 30-minute programme showing exclusive footage of pop band Bros in concert and on their UK tour. The programme is repeated on 29 December.
  - The Welsh language sports programme Sgorio debuts on S4C. It is set up to provide highlights of European football although other sports are included within it.
  - Also on S4C, the soap opera Pobol Y Cwm starts airing episodes 5 days a week rather than once which they had done since the series started in 1974, becoming the first British soap opera since Crossroads in the late 1960s to have been done this way. There is also a repeat screening on a lunchtime slot the following day.
- 6 September – The children's animated series Count Duckula makes its debut on Children's ITV. Devised as a sequel to Danger Mouse it again features the voice of David Jason.
- 7 September
  - Repeat showing of Paul Hamann's death row documentary Fourteen Days in May, telling the story of the final days of Edward Earl Johnson as he awaits execution on Mississippi's death row on BBC1. The film is followed on 14 September by The Journey, in which lawyer Clive Stafford Smith returns to Mississippi in an attempt to posthumously clear Johnson of the crimes to which he always professed his innocence.
  - BBC2 screens the Timewatch episode Shadow of the Ripper. Written and hosted by Christopher Frayling, it looks at the 100 year old Jack the Ripper murders.
- 8 September – Channel 4 drops plans to invite Sinn Féin leader Gerry Adams to appear on an edition of its late-night discussion programme After Dark, following objections from other contributors.
- 9 September – Casualty returns to BBC1 for a third series, moving from its previous Saturday evening slot to Friday evenings.
- 10 September
  - Presenters Mike Smith and Sarah Greene are seriously injured in a helicopter crash in Gloucestershire.
  - BBC2 screens Francis Ford Coppola's 1983 cult film adaptations of S. E. Hinton's The Outsiders and Rumble Fish, both starring Matt Dillon and Diane Lane.
- 12 September
  - Debut of Stoppit and Tidyup on BBC1, a 13-part animated series narrated by Terry Wogan and partly funded by the Tidy Britain Group charity.
  - Debut of 12-part documentary series Reaching for the Skies on BBC2, narrated by Anthony Quayle. The programme includes many aerial sequences specifically filmed for the series together with archive material combined with interviews. The aerial footage is usually accompanied by music sequences. The series ends on 28 November.
- 13 September – The children's animated series PC Pinkerton makes its debut on BBC1. The show is produced by Trevor Bond who has also worked on the original Mr. Men series and Bananaman with veteran animation producer Terry Ward and features the voice of Ian Lavender, best known for playing the role of Private Pike in the hit sitcom Dad's Army.
- 14 September – Debut of the eight-part Australian series The True Story of Spit MacPhee on BBC1. It concludes on 2 November.
- 17 September–2 October – The 1988 Summer Olympics are held in Seoul, South Korea. The BBC provides live coverage, as does ITV, in conjunction with Channel 4. This is to be the final time that ITV will broadcast the Olympic Games and Channel 4's only broadcast of the Olympics. ITV also shows daytime coverage while Channel 4 airs the overnight and breakfast coverage.
- 18 September – Debut of the BBC political discussion programme On the Record, presented by Jonathan Dimbleby.
- 23 September – Channel 4 launches the improvisational comedy game show Whose Line Is It Anyway?, presented by Clive Anderson and featuring numerous comedians and celebrities.

=== October ===
- 2 October – Debut of the long-running comedy sketch show Hale and Pace on ITV.
- 3 October
  - The magazine programme This Morning makes its debut on ITV. It is presented by married couple Richard Madeley and Judy Finnigan until 2001 and is broadcast from the Albert Dock in Liverpool until 1996.
  - Ulster is the last in the ITV network to begin 24-hour transmissions when it also begins showing Granada's Night Time service.
  - The Oprah Winfrey Show makes its UK debut on Channel 4.
- 5 October – ITV begins airing the Australian soap Richmond Hill in a 2pm slot on Wednesdays and Thursdays, the first time the channel has networked an Australian soap. However, some regions, including Central and Granada opt out of networking the series when it is cancelled by Network Ten the following year.
- 6 October – Thames, Border, Tyne Tees and Ulster air the final episode of The Sullivans, becoming the first ITV regions to complete the series.
- 7 October – Launch of LWT's current affairs programme Friday Now!.
- 11 October – ITV airs the first episode of the two-part miniseries, Jack the Ripper, starring Michael Caine, Lewis Collins and Jane Seymour.
- 14 October – Play School is broadcast for the final time on BBC1. The last new edition was shown in March.
- 17 October
  - Playbus, a television programme for preschoolers and the replacement programme for Play School, makes its debut on BBC1.
  - The sitcom Wyatt's Watchdogs makes its debut on BBC1.
- 18 October – Debut of the comedy series Colin's Sandwich on BBC2, starring Mel Smith.
- 19 October – 1988–1994 British broadcasting voice restrictions: Home Secretary Douglas Hurd issues a notice under clause 13(4) of the BBC Licence and Agreement to the BBC and under section 29(3) of the Broadcasting Act 1981 to the IBA prohibiting the broadcast of direct statements by representatives or supporters of 11 Irish political and paramilitary organisations. The ban lasts until 1994 and denies the UK news media the right to broadcast the voices, though not the words, of all Irish republican and Loyalist paramilitaries. In view of the restrictions, targeted primarily at Sinn Féin, broadcasters use actors to speak the words of any representative interviewed.
- 20 October – Debut of the 13-part children's stop-motion animated series Charlie Chalk, produced by Woodland Animations Ltd (the company behind Postman Pat) on BBC1, featuring the voices of Barbara Leigh-Hunt, Michael Williams and John Wells. The last three episodes will air the following year.
- 23 October – The final episode of Channel 4's groundbreaking youth music and current affairs programme Network 7 is broadcast.
- 25 October – As the 25th anniversary of the assassination of John F. Kennedy approaches, ITV airs the two-part documentary The Men Who Killed Kennedy, a film which explores discrepancies and inconsistencies in the US Government's official version of events.
- 29 October – The network television premiere of the 1985 fantasy adventure Red Sonja on BBC1, starring Brigitte Nielsen and Arnold Schwarzenegger.
- 30 October
  - Following the signing of a new four-year deal to show exclusive live coverage of top flight English football, ITV begins showing a live game every Sunday afternoon.
  - First Born, a three-part adaptation of Maureen Duffy's novel Gor Saga, makes its debut on BBC1.
- 31 October – For the first time, BBC2's Newsnight is given a fixed starting time of 10:30pm. It is established in the face of fierce objections from the managing director of BBC Television at this time, Bill Cotton, otherwise in charge of all scheduling decisions. The decision sparks a widely reported row within the corporation.

=== November ===
- 1 November – Having decided to step down from her presenting role on TV-am, Anne Diamond makes her final regular appearance on the station.
- 2 November
  - In the House of Commons, an amendment introduced by the opposition Labour Party condemning the government's decision over the broadcasting ban on featuring Irish Republican figures as "incompatible with a free society" is rejected, despite some Conservative MPs voting with Labour.
  - Evacuation, an episode of ITV's The Bill features one of the series' early prominent events, an explosion at Sun Hill police station.
- 7 November – A government white paper on broadcasting, Broadcasting in the '90s: Competition, Choice and Quality, includes provisions for a fifth UK television channel after management consultants Booz Allen recommend it as an option, claiming the extra channel would reduce the current ITV monopoly and also reduce advertising costs.
- 8 November – BBC1 airs Episode 523 of Neighbours, featuring the wedding of Scott Robinson and Charlene Mitchell, played by Jason Donovan and Kylie Minogue, which is watched by 20 million viewers.
- 12 November – BBC2 airs the first terrestrial television showing of Thérèse, Alain Cavalier's 1986 award-winning biographical drama about the life of the French Carmelite nun Thérèse of Lisieux which stars Catherine Mouchet. It is also shown as a double bill with the 1947 classic Black Narcissus and is introduced by English novelist Marina Warner.
- 13 November
  - The Lion, the Witch and the Wardrobe, one of C. S. Lewis's Chronicles of Narnia, is aired as a six-part TV serial on BBC1, starring Ronald Pickup, Barbara Kellerman and Michael Aldridge. The serial continues on 18 December.
  - The network television premiere of John Hughes' 1985 Brat Pack comedy drama The Breakfast Club on BBC2, starring Emilio Estevez, Molly Ringwald, Paul Gleason, Anthony Michael Hall and Ally Sheedy.
- 15 November – Debut of educational documentary series The Secret Life of Machines on Channel 4. It is hosted by inventor and roboteer Rex Garrod and engineer, cartoonist, artist and writer Tim Hunkin who is also the creator of the series.
- 16 November – Debut of Dennis Potter's four-part drama series Christabel on BBC2, starring Elizabeth Hurley, Stephen Dillane and Geoffrey Palmer. It is based on the memoirs of Christabel Bielenberg, an English woman married to a German lawyer who is shattered into the full horror of the Nazi regime during World War II. The serial continues on 7 December.
- 21 November – The Welsh children's stop-motion series Fireman Sam is broadcast in Singapore for the first time, being shown on MediaCorp Channel 5.
- 23 November – The long-running BBC science fiction series Doctor Who celebrates its 25th anniversary and begins the three-part serial Silver Nemesis.
- 24 November – Frank Ruse, a left-wing Labour councillor for Liverpool City Council, accompanies Liverpool's Pagoda Chinese Youth Orchestra to London for an appearance on Blue Peter. He is given a Blue Peter badge, but later receives a BBC-headed letter requesting its return. The letter, later discovered to be a forgery, claims the programme has been approached by the office of Labour leader Neil Kinnock expressing concern that a councillor with hard-left views had been given a Blue Peter badge. Upon receiving the returned badge, the BBC writes back to Ruse stating that it had not sent the letter. The incident prompts Ruse to start an enquiry to find out who sent the hoax letter.

=== December ===
- 1 December – ITV's ORACLE Teletext service launches Park Avenue, a teletext-based soap opera. It is written by Robert Burns and runs until they lose its franchise at the end of 1992.
- 3 December – Comedian Steve Tandy wins New Faces of '88.
- 10 December
  - ITV airs An Audience with Victoria Wood.
  - Channel 4 airs the marathon charity rock concert Human Rights Now!.
- 11 December – Launch date of the Astra Satellite. It will provide television coverage to Western Europe and is revolutionary as one of the first medium-powered satellites, allowing reception with smaller dishes than has previously been possible.
- 13 December – Central airs the final episode of Sons and Daughters, making it the first ITV region to complete the series.
- 18 December – The Flashing Blade airs for the last time on BBC1.
- 21 December – Both BBC channels and ITV airs newsflashes of a crash in the Scottish town of Lockerbie. BBC1's first news report is shown after Points of View, delaying the BBC 9'O Clock News. When it is announced that the crash was important, the channel interrupts the movie Poison Candy for another news bulletin. Another news report airs after the late night movie The Cruel Sea, shown as a part of one of the Movie Classics. BBC2 also airs a newsflash before Sweet Dreams, while ITV airs theirs during commercial breaks of Des O'Connor Tonight, Rumpole of the Bailey and Magnum Force, as well as airing a twenty-minute special report at 12.45am, delaying nightime programming.
- 22 December – Singer Neneh Cherry performs her single "Buffalo Stance" on Top of the Pops while seven months pregnant, something that goes on to cause a furore in the media.
- 23 December – BBC1 airs Blackadder's Christmas Carol, a special one-off episode which parodied Charles Dickens' 1843 novella A Christmas Carol and stars Rowan Atkinson as Ebenezer Blackadder.
- 24 December – Christmas Eve highlights on BBC1 include the network television premiere of Alexander Salkind's 1985 Christmas family film Santa Claus: The Movie, starring Dudley Moore and John Lithgow. The film would go on to become the most repeated Christmas film shown on British television on both BBC and ITV. The 1985 Richard Marquand directed thriller Jagged Edge, starring Jeff Bridges and Glenn Close, is shown later in the evening.
- 25 December
  - The final edition of It's a Knockout to air on BBC1 is another celebrity special, It's a Charity Knockout from Walt Disney World, featuring teams of celebrities from the UK, the US and Australia. The series returns to S4C in 1991.
  - "Ding Dong Merrily", the London's Burning Christmas special and the only episode of the series to have a title, airs on ITV as part of its Christmas Day lineup.
  - Christmas Day highlights on BBC1 include the network television premiere of Steven Spielberg and Robert Zemeckis' 1985 blockbuster sci-fi comedy Back to the Future, starring Michael J Fox and Christopher Lloyd, as well as Lawrence Kasdan's 1985 western adventure Silverado, starring Kevin Kline and Kevin Costner.
  - ITV's Christmas Day movie highlight is the network television premiere of the epic 1980 Star Wars sequel The Empire Strikes Back, starring Mark Hamill, Harrison Ford and Carrie Fisher.
- 26 December
  - ITV Boxing Day highlights include An Officer and a Car Salesman, the second feature length episode of Minder.
  - BBC1 the Boxing Day premiere of the blockbuster 1984 action comedy film Beverley Hills Cop, starring Eddie Murphy. This is the edited for television version, with the profanity censored.
  - BBC1 airs CivvyStreet, a spin-off episode of EastEnders, set during World War II. Later this evening, the channel airs Bruce and Ronnie, a Christmas special presented by Bruce Forsyth and Ronnie Corbett who first appeared together at the 1988 Royal Variety Performance.
  - As part of a Christmas special, the Channel 4 soap opera Brookside airs five episodes which last until 30 December.
- 28 December – BBC1 airs the first part of the Australian film Bushfire Moon. The second part is shown on 30 December.
- 29 December
  - Debut of You Rang, M'Lord? on BBC1. The last sitcom to be written by Jimmy Perry and David Croft, it is notable for its 50-minute-long episodes.
  - BBC2 airs the first terrestrial television showing of One Flew Over the Cuckoo's Nest, Miloš Forman's 1975 award-winning psychological drama based on Ken Kesey's 1962 novel of the same name which stars Jack Nicholson, Louise Fletcher, Will Sampson, Brad Dourif, Sydney Lassick and Danny DeVito.
  - The network television premiere of Joe Dante's 1984 smash hit comedy horror Gremlins on ITV, starring Zach Galligan, Phoebe Cates, Hoyt Axton and Corey Feldman.
- 30 December – Channel 4 airs "The Cotton Collection", an evening of classic BBC programmes, including episodes of Frost Over England and Dad's Army.
- 31 December – New Year's Eve highlights on BBC1 include a special edition of Top of the Pops celebrating the programme's 25th anniversary and the network television premiere of Perry Mason in the Case of the Sinister Spirit.

=== Undated ===
- Autumn – The BBC takes its first tentative steps into later closedowns. Previously, weekday programmes ended no later than 12:15am and weekend broadcasting at 1:30am.
- Swindon cable's TV channel is relaunched as Swindon's Local Channel. This sees the return to the service of local news, sport and one-off documentaries.

== Debuts ==
=== BBC1 ===
- 1 January – Way Upstream (1987)
- 3 January – First of the Summer Wine (1988–1989)
- 11 January – Star Wars: Droids (1985–1986)
- 16 January – Kissyfur (1986–1990)
- 19 January – The Play on One (1988–1991)
- 10 February – Moondial (1988)
- 24 February – Gruey (1988–1989)
- 5 April – Degrassi Junior High (1987–1989)
- 19 April – Talking Heads (1988, 1998, 2020)
- 3 May – 4 Square (1988–1991)
- 17 May – The Lowdown (1988–1998)
- 31 May – Tumbledown (1988)
- 8 June – The Movie Game (1988–1995)
- 1 July – The Flying Doctors (1986–1993)
- 24 July – Countryfile (1988–present)
- 3 September
  - The Noel Edmonds Saturday Roadshow (1988–1990)
  - Eggs 'n' Baker (1988–1993)
- 5 September – No Frills (1988)
- 12 September
  - Stoppit and Tidyup (1988)
  - Defenders of the Earth (1986)
- 14 September – The True Story of Spit MacPhee (1988)
- 15 September – The Snorks (1984–1989)
- 18 September – On the Record (1988–2002)
- 25 September – The Franchise Affair (1988)
- 17 October
  - Wyatt's Watchdogs (1988)
  - Playdays (1988–1997)
- 20 October
  - Charlie Chalk (1988–1989)
  - The River (1988)
- 24 October – Streets Apart (1988–1989)
- 25 October – South of the Border (1988–1990)
- 29 October – Hearts of Gold (1988–1996)
- 30 October – First Born (1988)
- 10 November – Thompson (1988)
- 13 November – The Lion, the Witch and the Wardrobe (1988)
- 4 December – The Rainbow (1988)
- 5 December – Supersense (1988)
- 21 December – Barney (1988–1989)
- 23 December
  - Billy's Christmas Angels (1988)
  - Blackadder's Christmas Carol (1988)
- 29 December – You Rang, M'Lord? (1988–1993)

=== BBC2 ===
- 4 January – Clarence (1988)
- 12 January – Geordie Racer (1988)
- 15 February – Red Dwarf (1988–1999, 2012–2020)
- 25 March – Two of Us (1987)
- 13 April – Sophia and Constance (1988)
- 8 May – Moviedrome (1988–2000)
- 9 May – DEF II (1988–1994)
- 12 September – Reaching for the Skies (1988)
- 23 September – A Gentleman's Club (1988)
- 3 October – Rapido (1988–1992)
- 13 October – Alexei Sayle's Stuff (1988–1991)
- 18 October – Colin's Sandwich (1988–1990)
- 15 November – The Train Now Departing (1988)
- 16 November – Christabel (1988)

=== ITV ===
- 4 January – After Henry (1988–1992)
- 6 January – Hannay (1988–1989)
- 10 January – Closing Ranks (1988)
- 11 January – The Real Ghostbusters (1986–1991)
- 17 January – Wish Me Luck (1988–1990)
- 18 January – Hard Cases (1988–1989)
- 19 January – That's Love (1988–1992)
- 24 January – Small World (1988)
- 27 January – Singles (1988–1991)
- 15 February – ITV News at 5:30 (1988–2012)
- 17 February – The Fear (1988)
- 19 February – A Kind of Living (1988–1990)
- 20 February
  - You Bet! (1988–1997, 2024–2025)
  - London's Burning (1988–2002)
- 22 February
  - Andy Capp (1988)
  - News at Twelve (1988)
- 13 March – Mr Majeika (1988–1990)
- 21 March – Lucky Ladders (1988–1993)
- 29 March – Codename: Kyril (1988)
- 10 April – Gentlemen and Players (1988–1989)
- 17 April – All Clued Up (1988–1991)
- 4 June – The One Game (1988)
- 6 June – Masha's Adventures (1988–2008)
- 19 July – Wheel of Fortune (1988–2001, 2024–present)
- 26 July – I Can Do That (1988–1991)
- 3 September
  - The Hitman and Her (1988–1992)
  - Motormouth (1988–1992)
  - Square Deal (1988–1989)
- 5 September
  - Jim Henson's Mother Goose Stories (1988–1990)
  - Tube Mice (1988)
- 6 September – Count Duckula (1988–1993)
- 7 September
  - The Joe Longthorne Show (1988–1991)
  - Toksvig (1988)
- 23 September – Beauty and the Beast (1987–1990)
- 2 October
  - Piece of Cake (1988)
  - Hale and Pace (1988–1998)
- 3 October
  - Game, Set and Match (1988)
  - This Morning (1988—present)
- 5 October – Richmond Hill (1988–1989)
- 11 October
  - Jack the Ripper (1988)
  - The Return of Shelley (1988–1992)
- 14 October – A Taste for Death (1988)
- 9 November
  - The Ratties (1988)
  - Palace Hill (1988–1991)
- 26 November – The Snow Spider (1988)
- 27 November – The Beiderbecke Connection (1988)
- 1 December – Park Avenue on ORACLE (1988–1992)
- 3 December – How to Be Cool (1988)
- 16 December – Edens Lost (1988)

=== Channel 4 ===
- 6 January – Little Prince Cedie (1988)
- 11 January – Fifteen to One (1988–2003, 2013–2019)
- 28 February – Helping Henry (1988)
- 9 March – Chelmsford 123 (1988–1990)
- 14 March – South (1988)
- 8 April – Winners (1985)
- 24 May – Echoes (1988)
- 12 June – The StoryTeller (1987)
- 19 June – A Very British Coup (1988)
- 5 August – The Incredibly Strange Film Show (1988–1989)
- 23 September – Whose Line Is It Anyway? (1988–1999)
- 3 October – The Oprah Winfrey Show (1986–2011)
- 31 October – This is David Lander (1988–1990)
- 6 November – Eurocops (1988–1992)
- 15 November – The Secret Life of Machines (1988–1993)
- 30 December – Twelfth Night (1988)

=== S4C ===
- 1 April – Jabas (1988–1990)
- 5 September – Sgorio (1988–present)
- 18 November – C'mon Midffîld! (1988–1994)

== Television shows ==
=== Returning after a break of a year or longer ===
- Shelley (1979–1984; 1988–1992) (as The Return of Shelley)

== Continuing television shows ==
=== 1920s ===
- BBC Wimbledon (1927–1939, 1946–2019, 2021–present)

=== 1930s ===
- Trooping the Colour (1937–1939, 1946–2019, 2023–present)
- The Boat Race (1938–1939, 1946–2019, 2021–present)
- BBC Cricket (1939, 1946–1999, 2020–2024)

=== 1940s ===
- Come Dancing (1949–1998)

=== 1950s ===
- What's My Line? (1951–1964, 1984–1996)
- Panorama (1953–present)
- What the Papers Say (1956–2008)
- The Sky at Night (1957–present)
- Blue Peter (1958–present)
- Grandstand (1958–2007)

=== 1960s ===
- Coronation Street (1960–present)
- Songs of Praise (1961–present)
- Doctor Who (1963–1989, 1996, 2005–present)
- World in Action (1963–1998)
- Top of the Pops (1964–2006)
- Match of the Day (1964–present)
- Crossroads (1964–1988, 2001–2003)
- Play School (1964–1988)
- Mr. and Mrs. (1965–1999)
- World of Sport (1965–1985)
- Jackanory (1965–1996, 2006)
- Sportsnight (1965–1997)
- Call My Bluff (1965–2005)
- The Money Programme (1966–2010)
- Reksio (1967–1990)
- The Big Match (1968–2002)

=== 1970s ===
- The Old Grey Whistle Test (1971–1987)
- The Two Ronnies (1971–1987, 1991, 1996, 2005)
- Pebble Mill at One (1972–1986)
- Rainbow (1972–1992, 1994–1997)
- Emmerdale (1972–present)
- Newsround (1972–present)
- Weekend World (1972–1988)
- We Are the Champions (1973–1987)
- Last of the Summer Wine (1973–2010)
- That's Life! (1973–1994)
- Wish You Were Here...? (1974–2003)
- Arena (1975–present)
- Jim'll Fix It (1975–1994)
- One Man and His Dog (1976–present)
- 3-2-1 (1978–1988)
- Grange Hill (1978–2008)
- Ski Sunday (1978–present)
- Terry and June (1979–1987)
- The Book Tower (1979–1989)
- Blankety Blank (1979–1990, 1997–2002)
- The Paul Daniels Magic Show (1979–1994)
- Antiques Roadshow (1979–present)
- Question Time (1979–present)

=== 1980s ===
- Play Your Cards Right (1980–1987, 1994–1999, 2002–2003)
- Family Fortunes (1980–2002, 2006–2015, 2020–present)
- Juliet Bravo (1980–1985)
- Cockleshell Bay (1980–1986)
- Children in Need (1980–present)
- Finders Keepers (1981–1985)
- Freetime (1981–1985)
- Game for a Laugh (1981–1985)
- Tenko (1981–1985)
- That's My Boy (1981–1986)
- Razzamatazz (1981–1987)
- Bergerac (1981–1991)
- Odd One Out (1982–1985)
- On Safari (1982–1985)
- 'Allo 'Allo! (1982–1992)
- Wogan (1982–1992)
- Saturday Superstore (1982–1987)
- The Tube (1982–1987)
- Brookside (1982–2003)
- Countdown (1982–present)
- Let's Pretend (TV series) (1982–1988)
- No. 73 (1982–1988)
- Timewatch (1982–present)
- Right to Reply (1982–2001)
- Up the Elephant and Round the Castle (1983–1985)
- Inspector Gadget (1983–1986)
- Bananaman (1983–1986)
- Just Good Friends (1983–1986)
- Philip Marlowe, Private Eye (1983–1986)
- Breadwinners (1983–1986)
- Breakfast Time (1983–1989)
- Dramarama (1983–1989)
- Don't Wait Up (1983–1990)
- Good Morning Britain (1983–1992)
- First Tuesday (1983–1993)
- Highway (1983–1993)
- Blockbusters (1983–93, 1994–95, 1997, 2000–01, 2012, 2019)
- The New Statesman (1987–1994)
- The Cook Report (1987–1999)

== Ending this year ==
- 2 January
  - No. 73 (1982–1988)
  - Weekend World (1972–1988)
  - Let's Pretend (1982–1988)
  - Bad Boyes (1987–1988)
- 13 January – Your Mother Wouldn't Like It (1985–1988)
- 28 January – Yes Minister (1980–1988)
- 30 January – Hi-de-Hi! (1980–1988)
- 9 February – Running Loose (1986–1988)
- 11 March – Play School (1964–1988)
- 16 March – Moondial (1988)
- 18 March
  - He-Man and the Masters of the Universe (1983–1988)
  - Rockliffe's Babies (1987–1988)
- 4 April – Crossroads (1964–1988, 2001–2003)
- 6 April – The Roxy (1987–1988)
- 17 April – Hot Metal (1986–1988)
- 28 April – Around the World with Willy Fog (1983)
- 30 April – The Loud House (1979–1988)
- 13 May – Tales of the Unexpected (1979–1988)
- 22 May – East of the Moon (1988)
- 30 May – All in Good Faith (1985–1988)
- 12 June – Weekend World (1972–1988)
- 23 August – Inspector Gadget (1984–1988)
- 26 August
  - Child's Play (1984–1988)
  - Valentine Park (1987–1988)
- 28 August
  - Get Fresh (1986–1988)
  - The Bretts (1987–1988)
- 10 October – Sorry! (1981–1982, 1985–1988)
- 23 October – Network 7 (1987–1988)
- 27 October – Beat the Teacher (1984–1988)
- 12 November – Bust (1987–1988)
- 29 November – Tickle on the Tum (1984–1988)
- 1 December – Button Moon (1980–1988)
- 3 December – New Faces (1973–1978, 1986–1988)
- 5 December – Stoppit and Tidyup (1988)
- 6 December – PC Pinkerton (1988)
- 17 December – How to Be Cool (1988)
- 22 December – The Ratties (1988)
- 24 December – 3-2-1 (1978–1988)
- 27 December – Executive Stress (1986–1988)
- 31 December – Little Prince Cedie (1988)

== Births ==
- 14 January – Jack P. Shepherd, actor
- 22 March – Gaz Beadle, TV personality
- 28 March – Lacey Turner, actress
- 5 July – Joe Lycett, comedian
- 12 August – Tyson Fury, boxer
- 25 October – Rylan Clark-Neal, born Ross Clark, TV personality
- 2 December – Alfred Enoch, actor

== Deaths ==
Date	Name	Age	Cinematic Credibility
1 January	Margot Bryant	90	actress (Minnie Caldwell in Coronation Street)
7 January	Trevor Howard	74	actor
7 January	Michael Mills	68	television producer
16 January	Ballard Berkeley	83	actor (Fawlty Towers)
27 February	Basil Boothroyd	77	television scriptwriter
18 March	Percy Thrower	75	gardener and broadcaster
6 April	John Clements	77	actor
15 April	Kenneth Williams	62	comic actor
27 April	David Scarboro	20	actor (Mark Fowler in EastEnders)
18 May	Anthony Forwood	72	actor
5 June	Michael Barrington	63	actor (Porridge)
8 June	Russell Harty	53	television presenter
7 July	Jimmy Edwards	68	actor (Whack-O!)
9 July	Barbara Woodhouse	78	dog trainer (Training Dogs the Woodhouse Way)
12 July	Josephine Douglas	61	actress and television producer
22 July	Patrick Newell	56	actor (The Avengers)
20 September	Roy Kinnear	53	narrator, actor, voice actor (Towser, Bertha, Willy Wonka & the Chocolate Factory)
21 September	Christine Norden	63	actress
4 October	Margaret Lacey	76	actress
11 October	Roy Herrick	52	actor
27 October	Charles Hawtrey	73	actor
15 November	Mona Washbourne	84	actress
1 December	Alun Oldfield-Davies	83	television executive

== See also ==
- 1988 in British music
- 1988 in British radio
- 1988 in the United Kingdom
- List of British films of 1988
