= Cabaret Mechanical Theatre =

English organization

Coordinates: 51.5118°N 0.1223°W

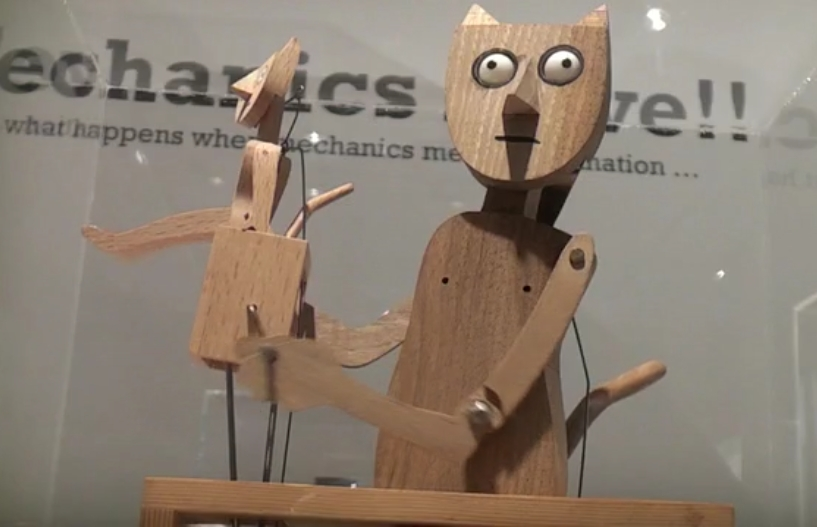
"Barecats" automaton by Paul Spooner, part of a Cabaret Mechanical Theatre exhibition at Glasgow's Scotland Street Museum in 2009

Cabaret Mechanical Theatre is an English organisation that mounts exhibitions around the world of contemporary automata by a collective of artists. Founded by Sue Jackson, the group played a central role in the revival of automata from the 1970s onwards, and Jackson championed the idea of automata as a form of contemporary art.

Cabaret Mechanical Theatre was started in 1979 in Falmouth, Cornwall, where Jackson encouraged local artists Peter Markey, Paul Spooner and Ron Fuller to manufacture automata for her craft shop, "Cabaret". The shop became an exhibition space and the collection moved to Covent Garden, central London, in 1984, remaining there until 2000 when rising rates forced it to close.

Part of the Cabaret Mechanical Theatre collection can be seen at the American Visionary Arts Museum in Baltimore, Maryland. Three machines made by Tim Hunkin, which were formerly part of the Covent Garden display, have been moved to Hunkin's own exhibition Novelty Automation in Holborn, London.
