= Novelty Automation =

Satirical amusement arcade in Holborn, London

Coordinates: 51.5197°N 0.1169°W

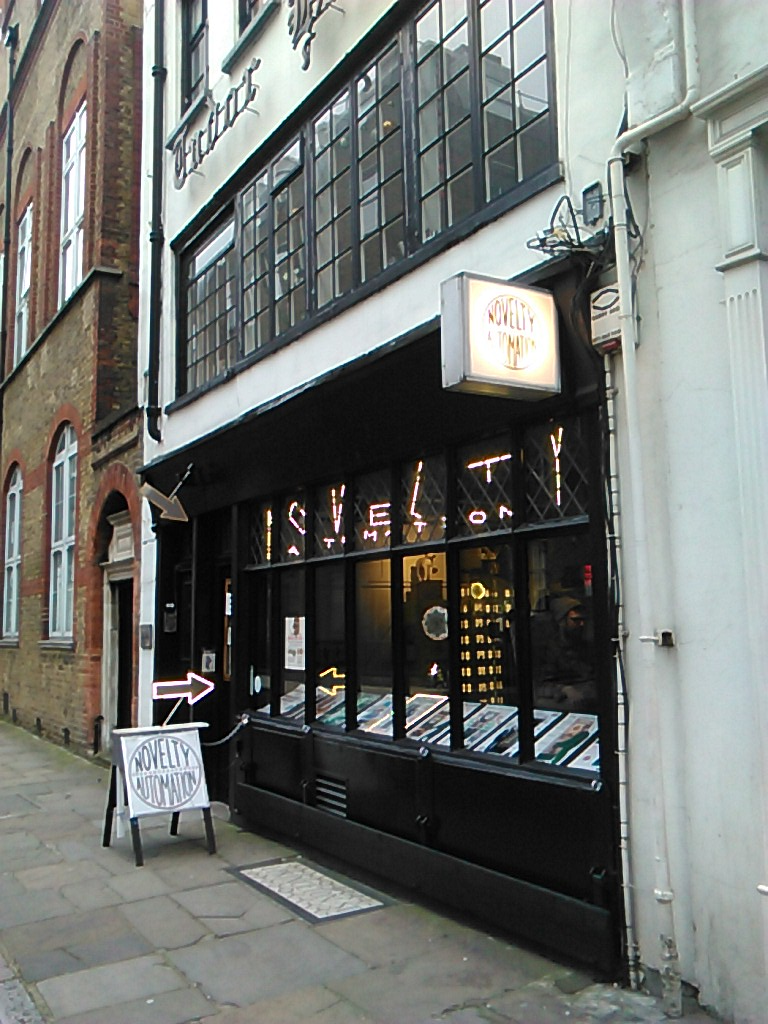
Novelty Automation

Novelty Automation is an amusement arcade of satirical game machines in Holborn, London. The machines are constructed by cartoonist and engineer Tim Hunkin, often by hand, and the arcade includes an expressive photo booth, an interactive divorce and a "small hadron collider". The arcade also includes three of Hunkin's machines which were once on display at Cabaret Mechanical Theatre's Covent Garden exhibition: The Frisker, Test Your Nerve and The Chiropodist.

== Background ==
Opened in February 2015, Novelty Automation is Tim Hunkin's second arcade, the first being The Under The Pier Show in Southwold where he created a number of "reinvented" amusement arcades. Hunkin said of his creations in 2017 that "It's just a hobby that took over my life really, it beats working."

Novelty Automation is Hunkin's tribute local history of popular entertainment in London, a place he has said he has an almost "missionary zeal" for. Hunkin has professed his sadness for the commercialisation of the city and he believes people appreciate Novelty Automation's political incorrectness and it being an antidote to the corporatisation of fun.

Discussing the venue's Housing Ladder slot machine, in which a player walks the treadmill steps of a physical ladder in order to move an automated figure towards a model house, Hunkin has said "I don’t think political art has an enormous effect, but in the short term it is satisfying to reinforce people’s disrespect of the villains." Hunkin spoke more on the subject at a talk he gave at Novelty Automation in November 2016 arguing that reinforcing people's disrespect for its targets is the primary purpose of satirical art, "but in the long term it can also contribute to change: there comes a point where the villains can no longer laugh it off".

== Machines ==
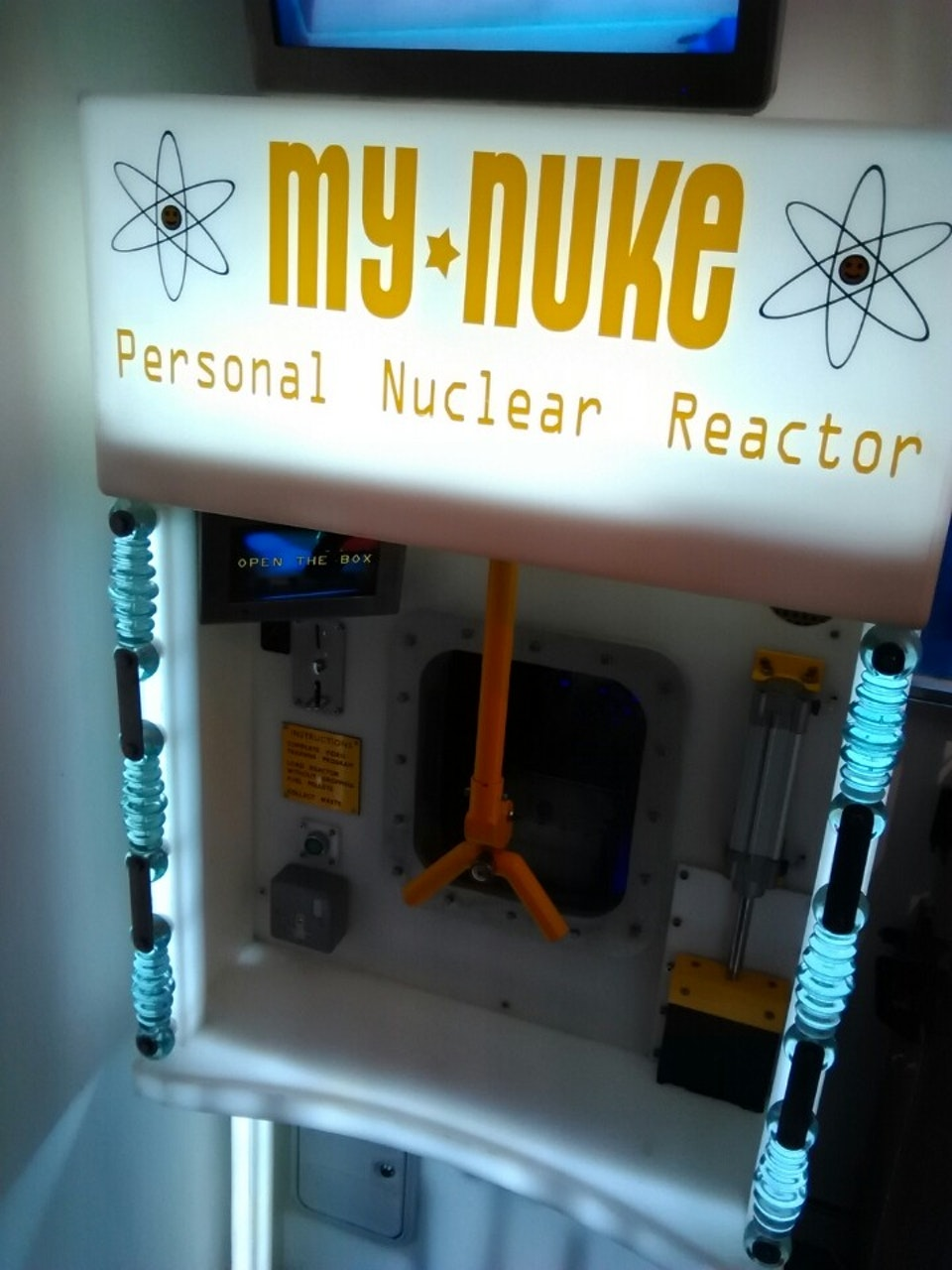
The "My Nuke Personal Nuclear Reactor" machine

Hunkin's machines at Novelty Automation have a technological style that blends old school electromagnetic approaches to movement - motors, pulleys and gears – with some aspects of more modern technology, used for video, sound and programming. Hunkin believes he is exploring a "limitless territory" and that modern world is too focused on “amazing software and simple physical interfaces… very few machines are the other way round".
