= Peter Markey =

English toy maker (1930–2016)

- Born: 1930; Swansea
- Died: 2016 (aged 85–86); Frome
- Education: Swansea School of Art
- Known for: automata

Peter Markey (1930–2016) was an artist, craftsman and teacher who was especially known for his automata.

== See also ==
- Ron Fuller (artist)
- Sam Smith (toy-maker)
- Tim Hunkin
