= Ron Fuller =

Ron Fuller may refer to:

- Ron Fuller (artist) (1937–2017), British artist and toy designer
- Ron Fuller (wrestler) (born 1948), American wrestler
