= Rex Garrod =

British inventor and roboteer (1943–2019)

- Born: 9 October 1943; Mickfield, Suffolk, England
- Died: 8 April 2019 (aged 75)
- Nationality: British (English)

Career history

Great Britain
- 1971: Ipswich
- 1972-74: Scunthorpe

Rex Garrod (10 September 1943 – 8 April 2019) was a British inventor and roboteer, and speedway rider. Garrod was notable for building the radio controlled car that starred in Brum, and co-presenting The Secret Life of Machines. Garrod entered several successful robots into the early series of British TV series Robot Wars. He was a rider for the Ipswich Witches (1971) and Scunthorpe Saints (1972–74) speedway teams.

== Early and personal life ==
Garrod grew up in Mickfield, Suffolk. He was a speedway rider for the Ipswich Witches (1971) and Scunthorpe Saints (1972–74). He and former motocross racer Dave Bickers then moved into special effects.

Garrod married Sally in 1992, and they had two daughters. He had Alzheimer's disease for the last eight years of his life, and died on 8 April 2019, aged 75.

== Television work ==
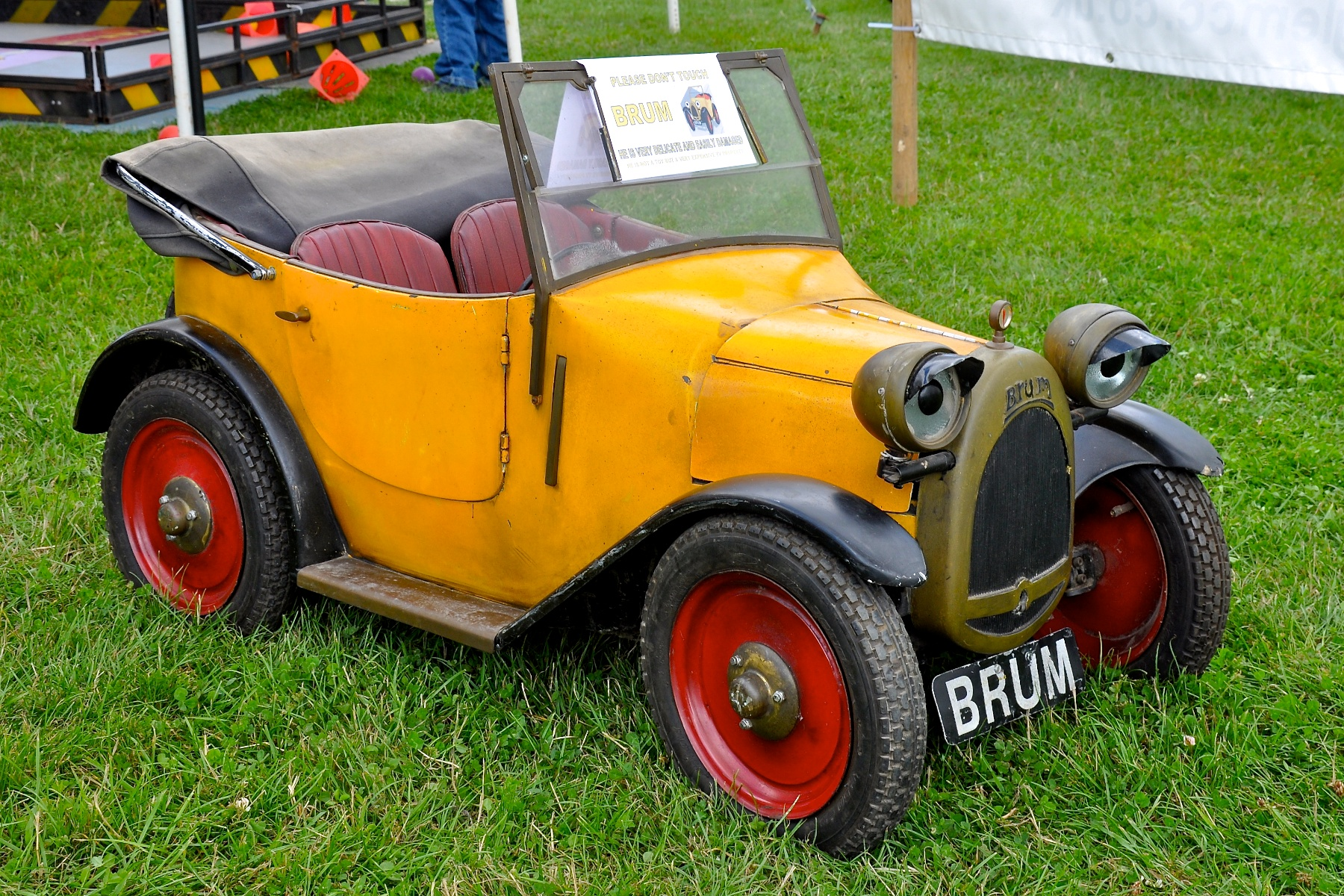
Garrod designed and built the eponymous car from Brum

Brum was a British television series which ran intermittently between 1991 and 2002. It told the story of a small car called Brum, which in reality was a giant remote control car. Garrod is credited with both designing and building Brum. He also made devices on the children's programme Teletubbies.

Garrod co-presented Channel 4's The Secret Life of Machines with Tim Hunkin, another inventor from the same county.

== Robot Wars ==
Garrod was Team Leader of Team Cassius, a team of roboteers which entered several robots into Series 1, 2 and 3 of Robot Wars. In addition to the performances of his robots, he was known for his generosity in helping other teams fix their robots.

In Series 1, Team Cassius entered "Recyclopse", which reached the Grand Final but lost to Roadblock.

In Series 2, Team Cassius entered 5th seeded "Cassius", a wedge-shaped robot armed with a front-pivoted flipper. Cassius was the first competitor in the show's history to "self right" (i.e. to turn itself over when it was upside down), and as such Garrod is often credited with inventing the so-called "srimech". Cassius also reached the Grand Final, but lost to Panic Attack.

In Series 3, Team Cassius entered second seeded "Cassius 2", a similar robot to its predecessor "Cassius", which lost to Series 4 runner-up Pussycat in the second round of the heats. His team then quit and never returned to the show, as their complaints about insufficient health and safety precautions were not listened to by the producers.
