= Reaching for the Skies =

- VHS video cover of Vol 1
- Genre: Documentary
- Narrated by: Anthony Quayle; Robert Vaughn
- Composer: Misc
- Country of origin: United Kingdom
- Original language: English
- No. of episodes: 12

Production
- Running time: ~55 minutes
- Production companies: BBC Birmingham, CBS

Original release
- Network: BBC
- Release: 12 September 1988

Reaching for the Skies is an aviation documentary TV series made by BBC Pebble Mill (with John Gau Productions) in association with CBS Fox. The first episode was transmitted in the United Kingdom on 12 September 1988 and in the US in 1989.

Narrated by British actor Anthony Quayle, and by Robert Vaughn for its American and International releases, it was divided into 12 programs (each of around 55 minutes' duration). The series producer was Ivan Rendall. Music used was mainly sourced from KPM Musichouse.

== Production content ==
The series included many aerial sequences specifically filmed for the series, together with archive footage. This was combined with interviews of those involved, the aerial footage was usually accompanied by music sequences.

The series interviewed many famous aviators, usually against a black backdrop, including Chuck Yeager, Scott Crossfield, Jimmy Doolittle, Bob Hoover, Sir Frank Whittle, Hanna Reitsch, and Captain Eric "Winkle" Brown.

== Music ==
A large amount of the music featured in the series was sourced from KPM Musichouse composers such as Rod Argent, Bob Howes, and Graham de Wilde. In selected scenes, this production music was blended with aerial footage shot from mostly unusual angles. As the music is production music, the songs are not available for the general public, however, media personnel may license the music in their productions for a nominal fee.

The title music song, entitled "The Moment of Triumph", was created by Roger Limb of the BBC Radiophonic workshop and performed by Rod Argent and Bob Howes.

== Episodes ==
12 episodes were filmed, first transmitted in the UK on BBC2 on the 12/9/1988. The episodes are listed below, along with accompanying background text from the VHS Videos:

1. "The Pioneers": A profile of the pioneers of aviation, including the Wright Brothers, Louis Bleriot, Dick Rutan, and Jeana Yeager.
2. "The Adventures of Flight": An account of the master aviators and experimental pilots who pushed the limits of aviation, featuring former test-pilot Bob Hoover and the first female Boeing 747 flight commander, Lynn Rippelmeyer.
3. "The Aeroplane goes to War": A historical survey of the role of aeroplanes in World War I, their first major military arena. The episode features interviews with World War I aviators from both sides, including George Vaughn, Ray Brooks, Carl-August von Schoenebeck, Wolfram Eisenlohr, and others, many recorded in their later years.
4. "Victory over the Sea": The story of the role of aviation in naval operations from the Second World War onwards, including the advent of the aircraft carrier and the expanded capability to deploy military aeroplanes across the ocean. Interviews include Captain Eric Brown, and the episode ends with a review of the modern carrier, and the effectiveness of the Sea Harrier over the Falklands.
5. "Bombers": An overview of the role of aviation in military attacks from above. The film covers: the Boeing B-52, and its effect on the people of Vietnam; the Heinkel He 111, and the bombing of Guernica; the Junkers Ju 87 Stuka, with interviews with pilots; the Avro Lancaster and its night campaign against Nazi Germany; the Boeing B-17 and its daylight bombing of the same; the Boeing B-29 Superfortress, used to devastate Japan; and finally the destruction of Hiroshima and Nagasaki with nuclear weapons.
6. "Fighters": An analysis of fighter planes, from World War II to the present, including stories from Korea, the Middle East, and Vietnam. The episode features planes including the EAP, the General Dynamics F-16, and the North American P-51 Mustang, as well as interviews with fighter pilots Robin Olds, Chuck Yeager, Randy Cunningham, and Heinz Lerche, and discussion of World War II, the Korean War, and the Vietnam War. The episode concludes by exploring the Top Gun and Aggressor Squadron programs for ACMI dogfighting training, as well as advances in electronic instruments being developed at the time, which have matured into modern helmet-mounted sensor display systems used in contemporary fighters.
7. "Giants of the Air": An episode about the role of very large aircraft, such as the Lockheed C-5 Galaxy. Topics examined include: the role of the Lockheed C-130 Hercules in humanitarian efforts in Ethiopia in the 1980s; the use of the Junkers Ju 52 in military operations in the Second World War; the role of the Douglas DC-3 in supporting the Flying Tigers in China and the Yugoslav Partisans; the rivalry of Howard Hughes and Owen Brewster in building large-capacity air transport services; the importance of the DC-3, Douglas DC-4, Avro York and Short Sunderland during the Berlin Blockade; and the Lockheed C-141 Starlifter's contribution to the Vietnam War and transporting U.S. casualties home. Gail Halvorsen is interviewed in the episode discussing Operation Little Vittles. The film ends with the early detailed footage of the Antonov An-124 Ruslan transport, very similar but slightly larger than the Galaxy.
8. "Rivals over the Atlantic": This episode charts the history of the race for transatlantic commercial aviation, particularly the development of the jet engine and role of the jet airliner, especially the Boeing 707, in long-distance air travel, and Europe's response in the form of the Concorde.
9. "Trail Blazers": The film starts with a brief account of Charles Lindbergh's solo transatlantic flight, before examining other revolutionary achievements in aviation such as the first flight of the Concorde, the first Transatlantic flight of Alcock and Brown, the flight from Australia to England by Ross Macpherson Smith and Keith Macpherson Smith, the early Barnstormers and flying circuses that contributed to pilots developing their skills. An interview with Harald Penrose about flying with British barnstormer Alan Cobham is featured. The episode further discusses the circumnavigation of the Earth by air, such as the 1924 flight around the world by the United States Army Air Service using 4 Douglas World Cruisers. Early accounts from U.S. Air Mail pilots are included. Other pioneering flights mentioned in this episode include Cobham's flight to Cape Town, South Africa, Richard E. Byrd's attempt to fly over the South Pole using a Ford Trimotor, Douglas Douglas-Hamilton's attempt to fly over Mount Everest, and the race to carry out the first non-stop flight from New York to Paris, for the Orteig Prize. René Fonck, Clarence Chamberlin, Richard E. Byrd, Charles Nungesser, and the team of Stanton Wooster and Noel Davis are noted, but Lindbergh was the first to successfully cross the Atlantic non-stop in 1927. His account of his historic flight is narrated. The subsequent rapid development of air travel in Europe and America is described, including Gore Vidal's account of his first transcontinental flight, the growth of Lufthansa, and Juan Trippe's attempts to dominate international air travel. The film ends with a narration from Charles Lindbergh's writings about the possible impact of aviation on the public.
10. "The Quest for Speed": This film focuses on attempts to fly ever faster, featuring aircraft such as the SR-71 Blackbird, the 1909 Curtiss biplane, and the Napier Lion-powered Supermarine S.5. Mary Haizlip talks about her experiences flying in the so-called 'Powder Puff' air races for women in the 1930s, Jimmy Doolittle discusses his experiences flying the Gee Bee R-1 when he won the Thompson Trophy in 1935, and Hanna Reitsch describes the power and acceleration of the Messerschmitt Me 163 Komet rocket-fighter. Yeager's flight of the Bell XS-1 through the sound barrier in 1947 is reviewed, along with other X-planes, culminating in the North American X-15 hypersonic research aircraft. The film concludes with the flight performance and pilots of the Lockheed SR-71, and high speed conceptions of future air-travel, particularly the National Aerospace Plane and HOTOL.
11. "Lighter than Air": This episode focuses on the history of ballooning, starting with the experiments of the Montgolfier brothers and the 1783 flight of Jean-François Pilâtre de Rozier and François Laurent d'Arlandes over Paris, and moving on to cover the flight of Jacques Charles and Marie-Noel Robert in the first hydrogen filled balloon, the 1785 crossing of the English Channel by Jean-Pierre Blanchard and John Jeffries, and James Glaisher and Henry Coxwell's record-breaking 1862 flight to over 30,000 feet. The episode subsequently charts the development of the airship, its use in World War I, and the golden age of large passenger airships with its high-profile disasters such as the Hindenburg disaster in 1937. Other topics include the rediscovery of balloons as an instrument of scientific research in the 1930s, and interview with Joseph Kittinger about the contribution of balloons to the U.S. space program in the 1950s, and more recent attempts by individuals such as Richard Branson to set new ballooning records.
12. "Vertical Flight": This episode examines the history of vertical flight, beginning with the early helicopters, through the pivotal breakthrough of the Cierva Rotor-head, the helicopters of Igor Sikorsky (with a contemporary interview), and the two great periods of helicopter military lifesaving in the Korean and Vietnam Wars, featuring the recollections of several decorated veterans of the conflicts. The episode continues with further developments in helicopter aviation, as well as a range of vertical aircraft such as the early Kestrel and Harrier programs, discussed in detail by test pilot Bill Bedford and designer John Fozard.

== VHS and book ==
The series was available as a six-volume VHS set.

The book, Reaching for the Skies: The Adventure of Flight by series producer Ivan Rendall was published in 1990 and made to accompany the series. ISBN 0-563-20913-5, ISBN 978-0-563-20913-3.
