= How to Be Cool =

1987 novel written by Philip Pullman

How to be Cool
- First edition
- Author: Philip Pullman
- Language: English
- Publisher: Heinemann
- Publication date: 1 September 1987
- Publication place: United Kingdom
- Pages: 160
- ISBN: 0-434-95781-X

How to be Cool is a 1987 novel written by Philip Pullman and intended for older teen readers. The plot revolves around a young man named Jacob who finds out the truth about the sinister plans of the National Cool Board and hits upon an idea to beat them at their own game.

== Release details ==
- 1987, UK Heinemann Young Books (ISBN 0-434-95781-X), Pub date 1 September 1987, hardback (First edition)
- 1987, UK Heinemann Young Books (ISBN 0-434-95782-8), Pub date 1 September 1987, paperback

Cover illustration & lettering: Martina Farrow

== Television adaptation ==
It was adapted for television in the United Kingdom by Granada Television for ITV, and starred Roger Daltrey and Freddie Jones. Three 50-minute episodes aired between 3–17 December 1988.
