= The Secret Life of Machines =

British television programme explaining the history and workings of various inventions

- Garrod (left) and Hunkin (right) demonstrating how to make "audio tape" from sticky tape and powdered rust
- Genre: Educational
- Created by: Tim Hunkin
- Developed by: Tim Hunkin
- Written by: Tim Hunkin
- Directed by: Andrew Snell (1988); Nigel Maslin (1990); Frank Prendergast (1993)
- Presented by: Tim Hunkin
- Starring: Tim Hunkin; Rex Garrod
- Narrated by: Tim Hunkin
- Theme music composer: Val Bennett
- Opening theme: The Russians are Coming (a cover of Take Five)
- Ending theme: The Russians are Coming
- Country of origin: United Kingdom
- Original language: English
- No. of series: 3
- No. of episodes: 18

Production
- Producer: Elizabeth Queenan
- Production locations: Lowestoft, Suffolk, England, United Kingdom
- Cinematography: Mike Coles
- Editor: Peter Cox
- Camera setup: Multi-camera
- Running time: 25 minutes
- Production company: Artifax

Original release
- Network: Channel 4
- Release: 15 November 1988 – 25 March 1993

Related
- The Secret Life of Components

The Secret Life of Machines is an educational television series presented by Tim Hunkin and Rex Garrod, in which the two explain the inner workings and history of common household and office machinery. According to Hunkin, the show's creator, the programme was developed from his comic strip The Rudiments of Wisdom, which he researched and drew for the Observer newspaper over a period of 14 years. Three separate groupings of the broadcast were produced and originally shown between 1988 and 1993 on Channel 4 in the United Kingdom, with the production subsequently broadcast on The Learning Channel and the Discovery Channel in the U.S.

In 2021, Hunkin made "remastered" versions of all episodes available online, on his YouTube channel. Each episode has a short reminiscence appended to it.

== Contents ==
Each of the Secret Life's individual series covers a particular set of machines. The first addresses household appliances, while the second includes devices used outside the home, such as the car. The third series examines the contraptions and gadgets used in a modern office.

A typical example of the animation style used throughout the series

Each episode was given an individual title, such as The Secret Life of the Vacuum Cleaner. Although ostensibly about a specific appliance or piece of technology, the scope of each episode was often widened to cover related technologies as well. For example, the video recorder episode looked at magnetic recording from its origins, and featured Hunkin and Garrod recording their voices on a crude home-made "audio tape" consisting of rust-coated sticky tape.

Another aspect of the programmes was their use of humorous animations based on Hunkin's own drawings. These cartoons were often based around the historical figures involved in the development of a particular technology. Furthermore, the illustrations were an artistic commentary on modern society, including segments on lift fantasies (as shown in the episode "The Lift") and corporate disregard for individuals' rights (featured in many episodes, including "The Radio" and "The Car").

Each programme concluded with an epilogue consisting of an elaborate installation, which resembled an aspect of the machine or technology under discussion. One example was a giant statue resembling a robot, which had been built from scrap computer monitors, printers and other parts, which was blown up using pyrotechnics. Hunkin described the destruction as an allegorical point that computers are just a collection of transistors and lack "superhuman intelligence".

== Production ==
All the series used a combination of mechanical models and animation to help explain various aspect of how the subject devices function. The animation for the series was done by Hunkin himself.

== Episode list ==
=== Series 1 (1988) ===
The first series covers household appliances.

No. overall	No. in series	Title	Original release date
1	1	"The Secret Life of the Vacuum Cleaner"	15 November 1988
Explores how a vacuum cleaner functions. Epilogue: Various vacuums fitted with pyrotechnics fly from a pile, guided by wires, with sparks streaming from the rear like a rocket. Historical Figures Mentioned: Hubert Cecil Booth, James M. Spangler, William H. Hoover
2	2	"The Secret Life of the Sewing Machine"	22 November 1988
Explores how a sewing machine functions. Epilogue: A modern sewing machine is shown embroidering "THIS IS THE END ** GOODBYE" on a piece of fabric. Historical Figures Mentioned: Thomas Saint, Barthélemy Thimonnier, Walter Hunt, Elias Howe, Isaac Merritt Singer, Edward Cabot Clark
3	3	"The Secret Life of the Central Heating System"	29 November 1988
Explores how a central heating system functions. Epilogue: A life-size model of a central heating system, used during the show, begins to spray water everywhere. Historical Figures Mentioned: Ancient Romans, Normans, Lord Burlington, Robert Bunsen
4	4	"The Secret Life of the Washing Machine"	6 December 1988
Explores how a washing machine functions. Epilogue: A pyramid of washing machines is switched onto spin cycle whilst Hunkin talks about recent developments
5	5	"The Secret Life of the Refrigerator"	13 December 1988
Explores how a refrigerator functions. Epilogue: Multiple refrigerators are made to dance around using stop motion animation
6	6	"The Secret Life of the Television Set"	20 December 1988
Explores how a television functions. (Note: Due to being produced in the late 1980s, the episode only covers Cathode Ray Tube displays and analogue transmissions.); Epilogue: A mountain of television sets are burned in a massive bonfire whilst still switched on

=== Series 2 (1991) ===
In the second group of programmes, devices used outside the home are investigated. The first two episodes are closely related, both dealing with the car and similar vehicles.

No. overall	No. in series	Title	Original release date
7	1	"The Secret Life of the Car"	8 January 1991
Explores how a car functions. This episode covers the body/chassis component only. Epilogue: The bodyshell of a Ford Cortina is cubed in a car crusher
8	2	"The Secret Life of the Internal Combustion Engine"	15 January 1991
Explores how an internal combustion engine functions. Epilogue: A running Ford Kent engine is carried to the centre of a "carhenge"—a replica of Stonehenge made entirely of car bodies—by several men in white coveralls
9	3	"The Secret Life of the Quartz Watch"	22 January 1991
Explores how a quartz watch functions. Historically also covers the history of time keeping, including early clocks, pocket watches and mechanical wristwatches. Epilogue: Tim Hunkin's closing narration is interrupted when an oven in the background bursts open, followed by a sped up and reversed recording of a watch in said oven baked to destruction
10	4	"The Secret Life of the Telephone"	29 January 1991
Explores how a telephone functions. Historically also covers the telegraph. Epilogue: Stop motion animation of various novelty phones dancing across a stage
11	5	"The Secret Life of the Radio Set"	5 February 1991
Explores how a radio functions and explains how radio waves can transmit signals and sound. Epilogue: Multiple radios (which have been converted into remote-control cars) are driven around, sometimes colliding into one another
12	6	"The Secret Life of the Video Recorder"	12 February 1991
Explores how a video recorder functions. Historically also covers the functions and development of magnetic recording, including audio recorders. Epilogue: Scrap video recorders are arranged to spell out "THE END." The camera then zooms out, revealing Tim watching a recorded version of the epilogue.

=== Series 3 - The Secret Life of the Office (1993) ===
The third and final series concentrated on office-related technology. It also introduced an animated set of fictional characters who worked in the offices of the fictional Utopia Services company.

No. overall	No. in series	Title	Original release date
13	1	"The Secret Life of the Lift/Elevator"	18 February 1993
Explores how a lift functions and its history, beginning with the initial efforts by Elisha Otis. Epilogue: Hunkin is "blasted" into the sky in a lift car powered by rocket motors.
14	2	"The Secret Life of the Word Processor"	25 February 1993
Explores how a word processor functions. This programme used its core subject as the basis for a look at many significant technologies surrounding modern computer systems, including how they evolved from the typewriter. Epilogue: A giant robot-shaped frame covered in computers bursts into flames sending the computers tumbling to the ground
15	3	"The Secret Life of the Electric Light"	4 March 1993
Explores how an electric light functions and the history of its development. Detail is also given on the various versions of light bulbs. Epilogue: As the camera is lifted into the sky on a crane, what seems at first to be randomly placed house lighting is gradually revealed to actually spell out "THE END".
16	4	"The Secret Life of the Photocopier"	11 March 1993
Explores how a photocopier functions, and explores early attempts in document duplication. Epilogue: Tim Hunkin is revealed to be sitting on top of a mountain of shredded paper at a recycling centre, followed by video of him using a bulldozer to drive through the pile.
17	5	"The Secret Life of the FAX Machine"	18 March 1993
Explores how a fax machine functions, and covers the history of early pantelegraphs and telecopiers. Epilogue: While testing out his home built model of a Pantelegraph, it begins to smoke and finally explodes.
18	6	"The Secret Life of the Office"	25 March 1993
Explores how an office functions. The final "Secret Life" programme broadcast, this episode covered not just physical technologies, but also the evolution of social engineering involved in the running of an office. Epilogue: An office goes haywire just after a holiday party, blowing paper everywhere, shaking binders and everything generally moving with a will of its own. After the chaos winds down, Tim Hunkin cautiously emerges from under a desk.

== The Secret Life of Components ==
Coinciding with the release of the remastered original episodes of The Secret Life Of Machines (see below), Tim Hunkin began a self-produced spiritual successor called The Secret Life of Components. It explored some of the individual parts that so often make up the appliances and machines that were the focus of the original series. The 8 weekly episodes included what Hunkin has learned through his experience with the component, along with many models for demonstration and examples from his amusement machines and other works. It premiered March 3, 2021 on Hunkin's YouTube channel with an episode on chain and belts. In the last episode of series 1, Hunkin commented that he may make another series the following winter. A 5 episode second series then debuted in spring 2022. On March 27, 2023, a third series of four episodes was announced on Hunkin's YouTube channel.

=== Series 1 (2021) ===
No. overall	No. in series	Title	Original release date
1	1	"Chain and Belts"	3 March 2021
Explores chains and belts, including demonstrations of different types of roller chain, round and toothed belts
2	2	"LEDs"	10 March 2021
LED history, brightness and color, use in diorama, addressable LED strips, and power LEDs for home lighting
3	3	"Hinges"	17 March 2021
An overview of different types of hinges and their usage around the home and in machinery.
4	4	"Switches"	25 March 2021
An overview on how electrical switches work, and how to use microswitches for sensing and power switching in projects.
5	5	"Springs"	1 April 2021
Explores springs, their manufacture, properties, and several different types of springs with their use cases.
6	6	"Connectors"	8 April 2021
A wide variety of connectors are shown and their operation explained, including their benefits, drawbacks and how they may be used in equipment
7	7	"Glue"	15 April 2021
Explores different types of glue, their properties and uses.
8	8	"Bearings"	22 April 2021
A wide variety of bearings, bushes, and races are explained with their uses and properties including materials and lubrication

=== Series 2 (2022) ===
No. overall	No. in series	Title	Original release date
9	1	"Sensors"	31 March 2022
Explores use of various sensor and feedback devices
10	2	"Linkages and Mechanisms"	6 April 2022
Explanations and demonstrations of levers, linkages, cranks, crankshafts, cams and capstans
11	3	"Motors"	14 April 2022
Exploration of principles, properties and control of electric motors, particularly focussing on DC varieties
12	4	"Screw Threads"	21 April 2022
Creation, usage, and troubleshooting of varieties of screw threads
13	5	"Prototypes"	28 April 2022
Principles and processes of using prototypes of various forms in the creation of a final work

=== Series 3 (2023) ===
No. overall	No. in series	Title	Original release date
14	1	"Pneumatics"	30 March 2023
Explanations and demonstrations of uses of pneumatic components and devices
15	2	"Solenoids and Relays"	6 April 2023
Explanations and demonstrations of uses of solenoids and relays
16	3	"Hole Cutting"	14 April 2023
Demonstrations and examples of various drilling and other hole cutting methods
17	4	"Programmable logic controllers"	21 April 2023
Demonstrations and uses of programmable logic controllers (PLCs)
18	5	"GEARS"	19 July 2025
Explanations and demonstrations of uses of gears and different types

== Creative uses ==
Hunkin and Garrod used the series to show some of their devices they built from parts of machines featured on their programme. The creations, some of which were decorative, others functional, show the potential uses of broken machinery. An extreme example is the giant clock powered by steam. In the epilogue for the remastered version of the episode, Hunkin mentions that the clock has been non functional for a long time.

== Availability ==
In March 2021, Hunkin began posting remastered versions of the episodes to YouTube. These were upscaled from an analogue video source to improve the image quality and include a short, recently filmed reminiscence by Hunkin at the end of each episode. The first 6 remastered episodes, comprising the complete first series, were posted to YouTube on Saturday, March 13, 2021. Starting on Thursday, May 6, 2021, Tim started posting episodes from Series 2 at a rate of one a week (give or take a day). As of June 12, 2021, all 6 remastered episodes from this series have been posted on his channel. Series 3 followed a similar weekly schedule, with the Fax Machine episode being posted on June 18, 2021. All of the six episodes have been posted, with the final episode released on July 22, 2021.
