= The Lowdown (British TV series) =

- Genre: Documentary
- Developed by: Landseer Productions
- Country of origin: United Kingdom
- Original language: English
- No. of episodes: 66

Original release
- Network: CBBC, BBC One
- Release: 17 May 1988 – 12 May 1998

The Lowdown is a documentary series for young people first broadcast on Children's BBC on 17 May 1988. Reminiscent of World in Action and Panorama it was produced by Landseer Productions, and broadcast after Newsround (and similar to Newsround Extra) until 12 May 1998.

One episode of the documentary (filmed in Page Moss, Liverpool in 1992) looked at an educational programme called "Child to Child" and how it was being used to combat problems with solvent abuse that were prevalent in the area at the time.
