= Southwold Pier =

Pier in Southwold, Suffolk, England

Coordinates: 52.329°N 1.685°E

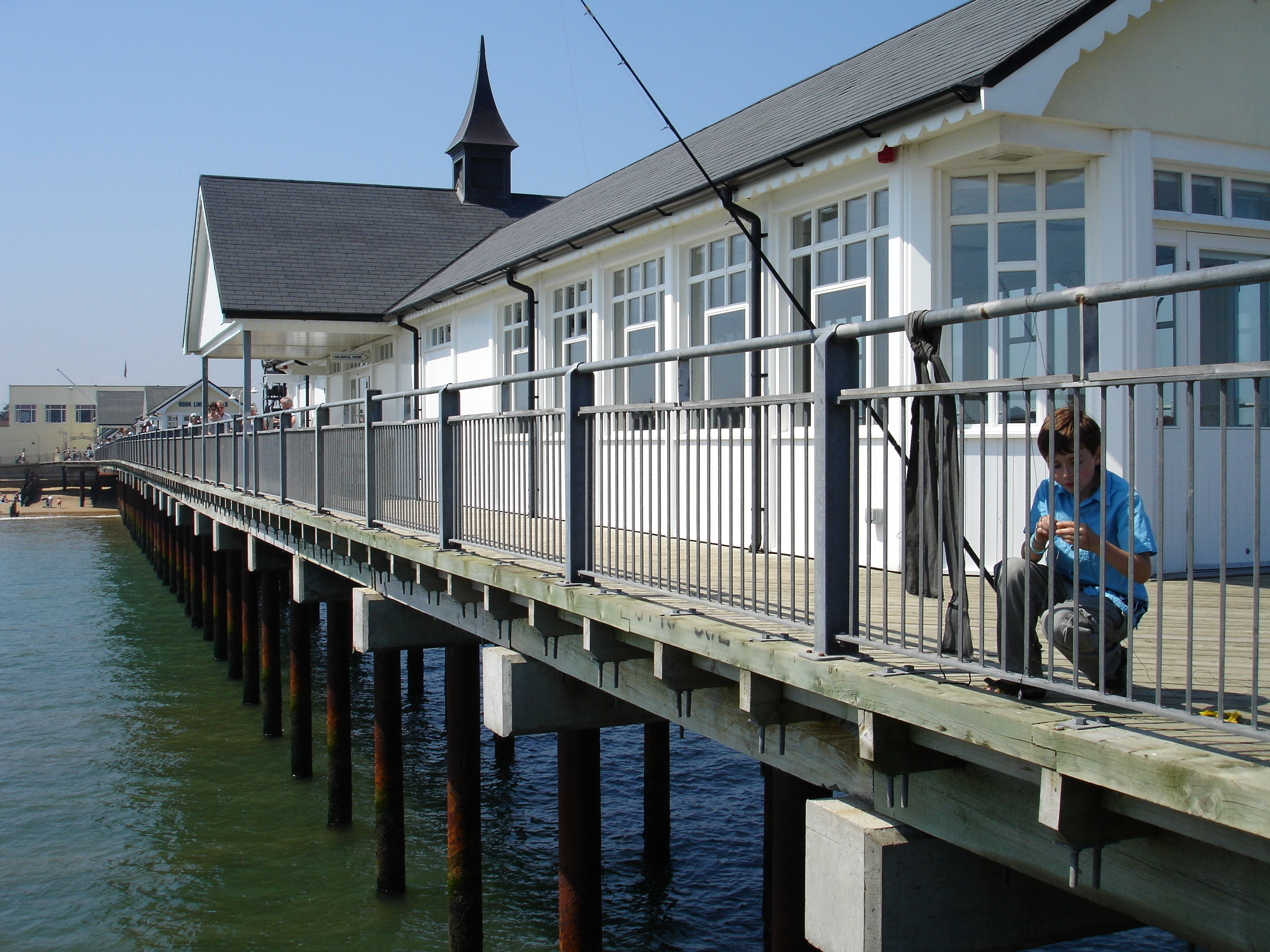
- Southwold Pier
- Type: Pleasure Pier
- Spans: North Sea
- Location: Southwold
- Official name: Southwold Pier
- Owner: Charles & Amy Barwick

Characteristics
- Total length: 623 feet (190 m)

History
- Designer: W Jeffrey
- Opening date: 1900

Southwold Pier is a pier in the coastal town of Southwold in the English county of Suffolk. It is on the northern edge of the town and extends 190 metres (620 ft) into the North Sea.

Whilst many English seaside piers are in decline, Southwold Pier is enjoying renewed popularity. It includes a collection of modern coin-operated novelty machines designed and constructed by the inventor Tim Hunkin.

== History ==
The pier was authorised by the Southwold Pier Order 1899, and built in 1900 as a landing stage for steamships that brought tourists from London, Clacton and Great Yarmouth until the 1930s. It was 270 yards (250 m) in length and finished with a T-shaped end.

The ownership of the pier transferred from that of the Coast Development Company following its winding up in 1906, to the Amusement Equipment Company.

The landing stage of the pier was destroyed during a storm in 1934, with the T-shaped end being swept away. An addition to the pier of a concert hall and amusement arcade was made during 1937 at the shore end of the pier.

During the Second World War the pier had a section removed due to the fear of its use during an invasion. Further damage occurred from an impact with a mine. The pier was rebuilt after the war at a cost of £30,000.

Pier and Harbour Order (Southwold) Confirmation Act 1949
- Act of Parliament
- Parliament of the United Kingdom
- Long title: An Act to confirm a Provisional Order made by the Minister of Transport under the General Pier and Harbour Act 1861 relating to Southwold.
- Citation: 12, 13 & 14 Geo. 6. c. xxiii

Dates
- Royal assent: 30 July 1949

Other legislation
- Relates to: General Pier and Harbour Act 1861

Text of statute as originally enacted

Further damage caused by storms in October 1955 and February 1979 left the length of the pier at 20 yards (18 m).

In 1960, a part of the pier pavilion was transformed into the Neptune Bar public house.

Parts of the pier were further restored during 1987 where additional work was carried out to both the theatre and function room. After this work, the pier then reopened in December 1988.

== Ownership ==
Southwold Pier was bought by Chris Iredale in 1987. He was responsible for a complete rebuild of the pier from 70 feet long to 623 feet long, for which he received the Pier of the Year Award in 2002. It was sold to Stephen and Antonia Bournes in March 2005, who created a modernised eating and retail experience for which they received three awards (including Outstanding Contribution to Tourism 2009). Stephen Bournes worked extensively with Tim Hunkin, creating more space for his penny arcade novelty machines in the Under the Pier Show; together they also installed galvanised windbreaks, the Quantum Tunnelling Telescope and a small music bandstand. It was sold to Gough Hotels in 2013, owners of the Salthouse Harbour Hotel in Ipswich and The Angel Hotel in Bury St Edmunds. In March 2024, the Pier was sold to Amy & Charles Barwick.

== Restoration ==
The pier was bought by Chris Iredale in 1987 and he first spent five years turning the pavilion into a profit-making business. A major refurbishment program was started in 1999 in order to rebuild the pier. This was completed to a design by Brian Haward ARIBA AABC Architect of The Rope House Southwold and constructed by Nick Haward [Southwold] Limited in 2001 almost 100 years after it was first opened. In 2002 a new T-Shaped end was added, bringing the pier to a total length of 208 yards (190 m). This additional length now allows the pier to accommodate visits by Britain's only surviving sea-going steam passenger ship, the PS Waverley paddle steamer and its running mate the MV Balmoral.

== Attractions ==
The pier is home to several shops and attractions including traditional souvenir shops, cafés, restaurants and amusement arcades.

== The Under The Pier Show ==
Since 2001 the pier has hosted an arcade with a range of automata, machines and games designed by Tim Hunkin. Hunkin originally approached the owner of the pier after his original location for one of his arcade games drew local complaints

== Awards ==
- 2002 National Piers Society - Pier of the Year
- 2008 Regional Enjoy England Awards for Excellence - Best Tourism Experience of the Year
- 2009 Tourism in Suffolk, Archant - Outstanding Contribution to Tourism
- 2011 Tourism in Suffolk, Archant - Best Large Tourist Attraction

== Gallery ==
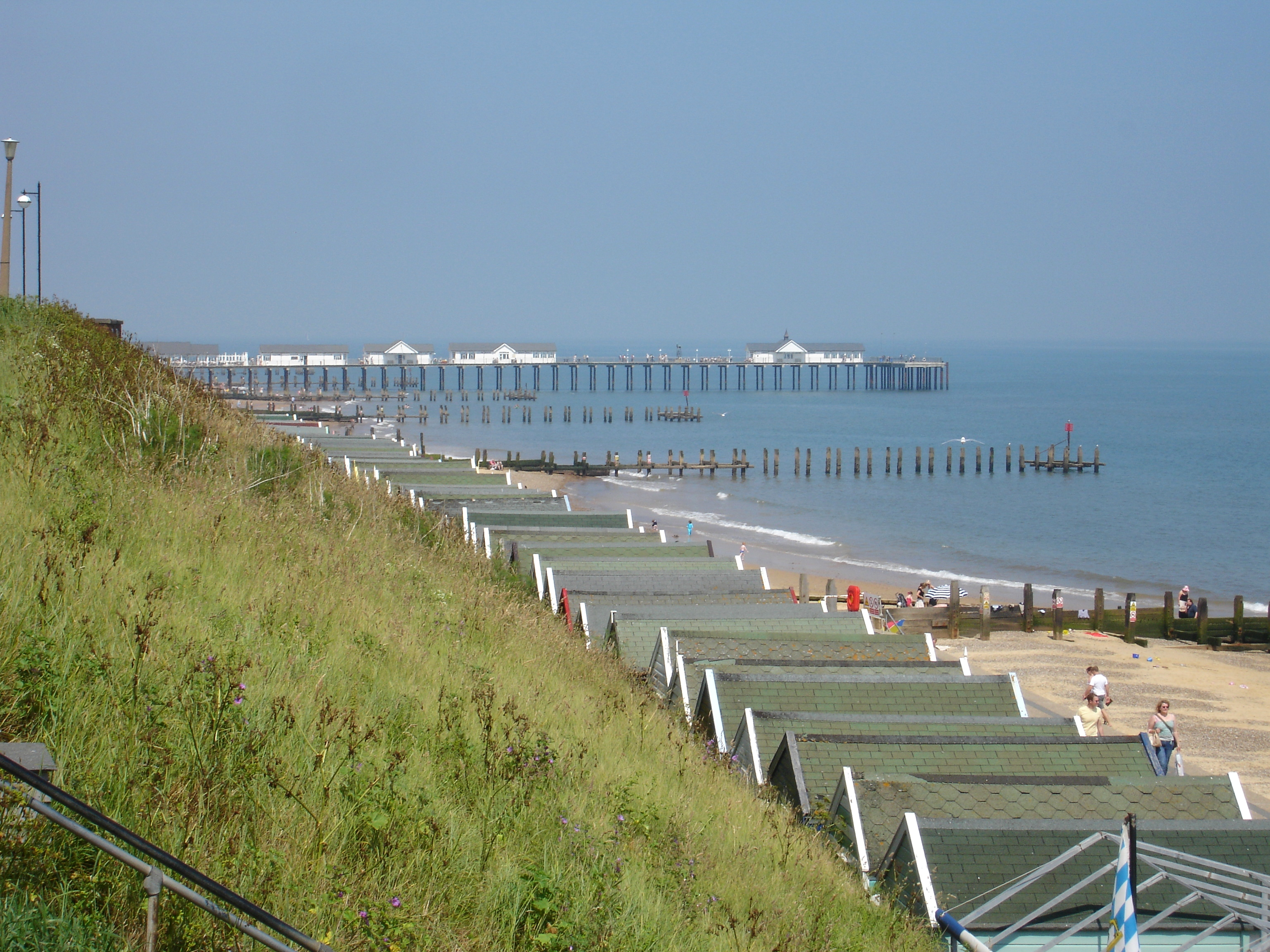
Southwold Pier

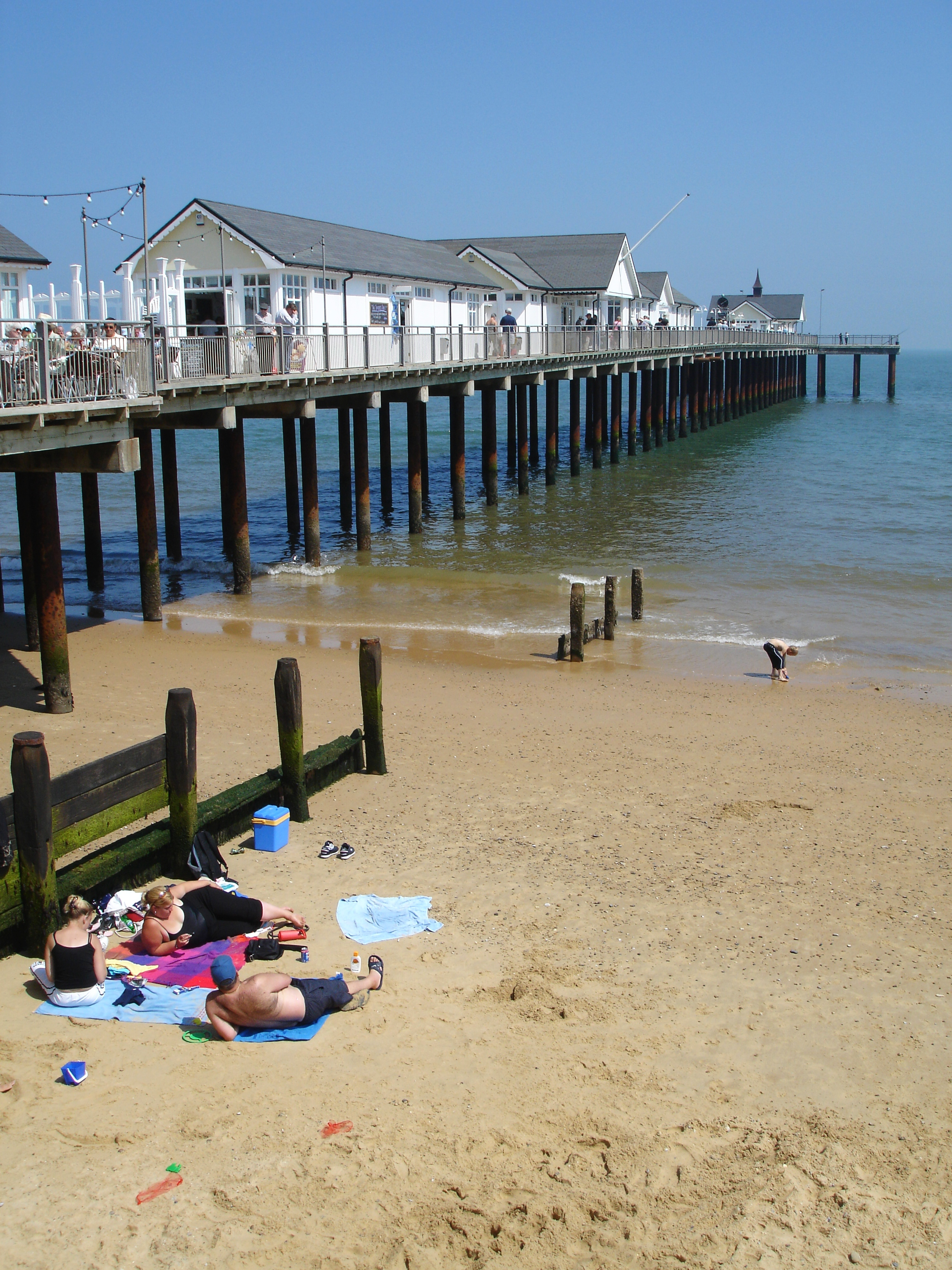
Southwold Pier

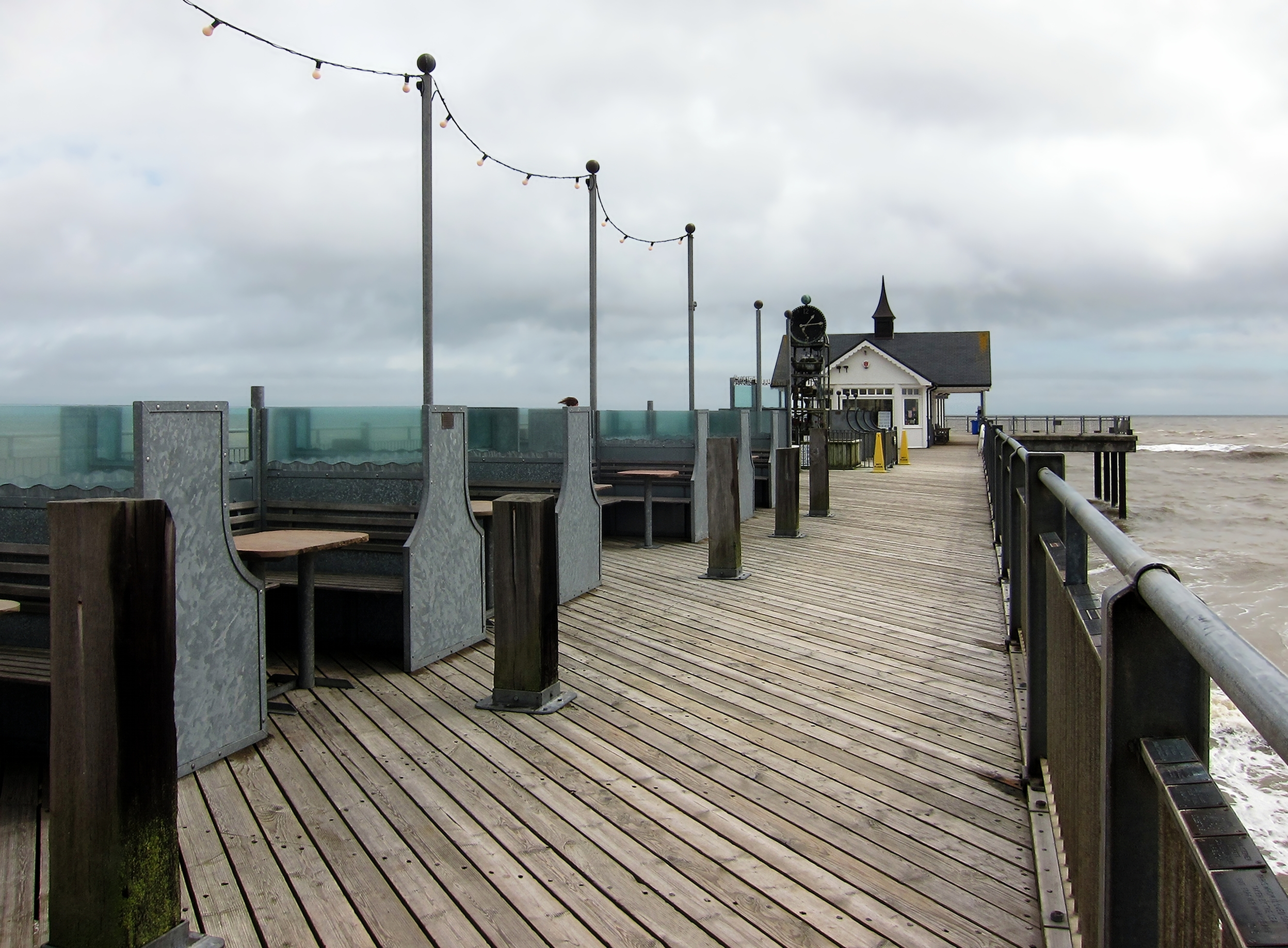
Southwold Pier

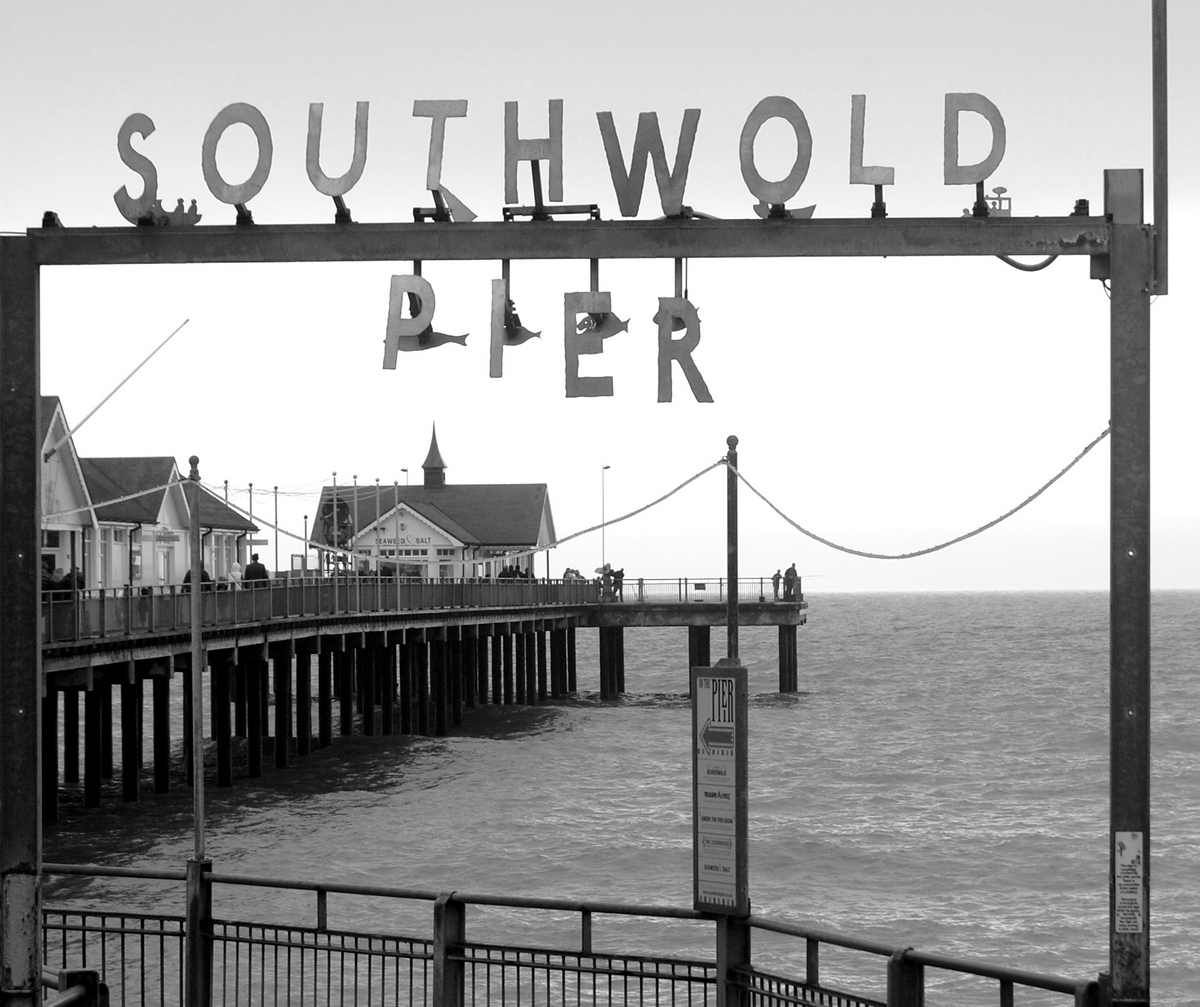
Southwold Pier entrance sign

Awards and achievements
Preceded by Grand Pier, Weston-super-Mare	National Piers Society; Pier of the Year; 2002	Succeeded by Southport Pier
