= Anthony Quayle =

British actor (1913–1989)

Sir Anthony Quayle CBE
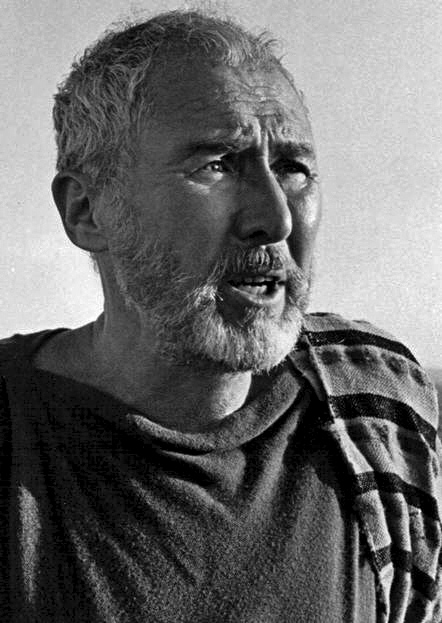
- Quayle in The Story of David (1976)
- Born: John Anthony Quayle; 7 September 1913; Ainsdale, Southport, Lancashire, England
- Died: 20 October 1989 (aged 76); Chelsea, London, England
- Education: Abberley Hall School; Rugby School
- Occupations: Actor; director
- Years active: 1935–1989
- Spouses: Hermione Hannen (m. 1935; div. 1941) Dorothy Hyson (m. 1947)
- Children: 3
- Military career
- Allegiance: United Kingdom
- Branch: British Army; Special Operations Executive
- Service years: 1940–1945
- Rank: Major
- Unit: Royal Artillery
- Conflicts: World War II; Mediterranean theatre
- Awards: Mentioned in Despatches

Sir John Anthony Quayle (7 September 1913 – 20 October 1989) was a British actor who was nominated for an Oscar and a Golden Globe for his supporting role as Thomas Wolsey in the film Anne of the Thousand Days (1969). He also played important roles in such major studio productions as The Guns of Navarone (1961), Lawrence of Arabia (1962), The Fall of the Roman Empire (1964), Operation Crossbow (1965), QB VII (1974) and The Eagle Has Landed (1976). Quayle was knighted in the 1985 New Year Honours.

== Early life ==
Quayle was born on 7 September 1913 at 2 Delamere Road, Ainsdale, Southport, Lancashire, to solicitor Arthur Quayle, of a Manx family, and Esther Kate Quayle (née Overton).

He was educated at Abberley Hall School, a preparatory school in Abberley, Worcestershire, and at Rugby School, then an all-boys independent boarding school. He trained for one year at the Royal Academy of Dramatic Art (RADA) in London. His first professional stage appearance was in The Ghost Train at the Q Theatre, while on holiday from RADA. After appearing in music hall, he joined the Old Vic in 1932.

== Second World War service ==
During the Second World War, he served in the Royal Artillery. Having joined as a gunner (i.e. private), he attended the 70th Coast Defence Training Regiment and was commissioned second lieutenant on 7 January 1940. He was made one of the area commanders of the Auxiliary Units in Northumberland. The units were "stay-behind forces" in case of a German invasion.

Later, Quayle joined the Special Operations Executive (SOE) and served as a liaison officer with the partisans in Albania. Reportedly, his service with the SOE seriously affected him and he never felt comfortable talking about it. He described his experiences in a fictional form in Eight Hours from England.

He was an aide to the Governor of Gibraltar at the time of the air crash of General Władysław Sikorski's aircraft on 4 July 1943. He wrote of his Gibraltar experience in his second novel On Such a Night, published by Heinemann.

By the end of the war, he held the rank of temporary major. In May 1946, it was published that he had been mentioned in despatches "in recognition of gallant and distinguished services in the Mediterranean Theatre".

== Career ==
=== Theatre ===
From 1948 to 1956 Quayle directed at the Shakespeare Memorial Theatre, and laid the foundations for the creation of the Royal Shakespeare Company. His own Shakespearian roles included Falstaff, Othello, Benedick in Much Ado About Nothing, Henry VIII and Aaron in Titus Andronicus with Laurence Olivier. He also played Mosca in Ben Jonson's Volpone; and he appeared in contemporary plays. He played the role of Moses in Christopher Fry's play The Firstborn, starring opposite Katharine Cornell. He also made an LP with Cornell, in which he played the role of poet Robert Browning in The Barretts of Wimpole Street.

Quayle made his Broadway debut in The Country Wife in 1936. Thirty-four years later, he won critical acclaim for his starring role in the highly successful Anthony Shaffer play Sleuth, which earned him a Drama Desk Award.

Quayle played James Tyrone in the first UK production of Eugene O'Neill's Long Day's Journey Into Night (Globe Theatre, London, 1958).

Quayle was artist-in-residence at the University of Tennessee in the mid-70s. He came to Knoxville in spring 1974 through a partnership with the Kennedy Center, starring in Henry Denker's The Headhunters, which rehearsed and opened at the Clarence Brown Theatre and then moved on to the Kennedy Center's Eisenhower Theatre. Quayle was appointed as professor of theatre in 1974. He taught classes as an artist in residence and served as artistic director of the Clarence Brown Company—a professional theatre company in residence at UT. He played in Everyman the same year.

In 1984, he founded Compass Theatre Company, that he inaugurated with a tour of The Clandestine Marriage, both directing and playing the part of Lord Ogleby. This production had a run at the Albery Theatre, London. With the same company, he subsequently toured with a number of other plays, including Saint Joan, Dandy Dick and King Lear with himself in the title role.

=== Film and television ===
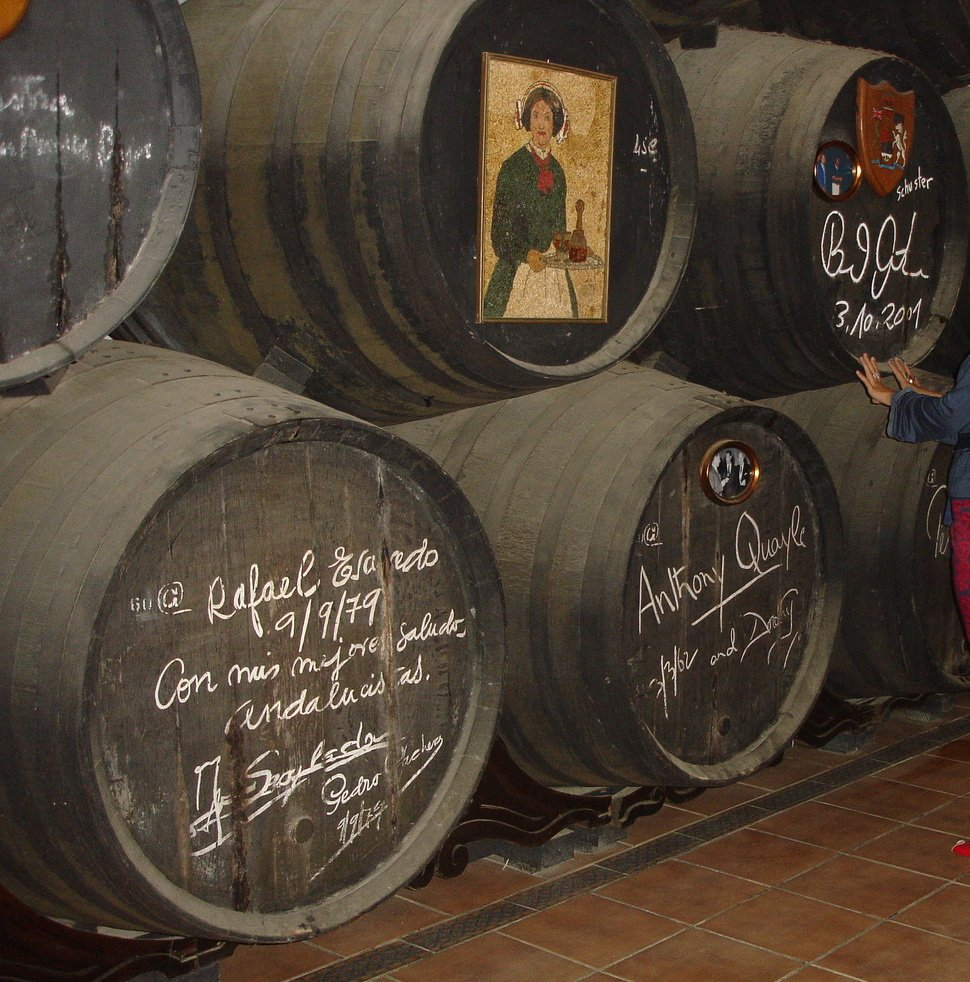
Sherry barrel signed by Anthony Quayle

His first film role was an uncredited brief appearance as an Italian wigmaker in Pygmalion (1938) – later film roles included parts in Alfred Hitchcock's The Wrong Man, Michael Powell and Emeric Pressburger's The Battle of the River Plate (both 1956), Ice Cold in Alex (1958), Tarzan's Greatest Adventure (1959), The Guns of Navarone (1961), H.M.S. Defiant, David Lean's Lawrence of Arabia (both 1962) and The Fall of the Roman Empire (1964). He was nominated for an Academy Award for Best Supporting Actor for his role as Cardinal Wolsey in Anne of the Thousand Days (1969).

Often cast as the decent British officer, Quayle drew upon his wartime experiences, bringing authenticity to the parts absent from the performances of some non-combatant stars. Nonetheless, he convincingly also played a German Panzer officer and spy in Ice Cold in Alex. One of his best friends from his days at the Old Vic was fellow actor Alec Guinness, who appeared in several films with him. He was also a close friend of Jack Hawkins and Jack Gwillim; all four actors appeared in Lawrence of Arabia.

Television appearances include the Armchair Theatre episode "The Scent of Fear" (1959) for ITV, the title role in the drama series Strange Report (ITC, 1969) and as French General Villers in the television film adaptation of The Bourne Identity (1988). He starred in the miniseries Masada (1981) as Rubrius Gallius. Also he narrated the BBC drama serial The Six Wives of Henry VIII (1970), and the acclaimed aviation documentary series Reaching for the Skies (1988). Quayle also starred in the 'Last Bottle in The World' episode of Tales of the Unexpected.

== Caedmon Records ==
Quayle's many recordings for Caedmon Records include Macbeth with Gwen Ffrangcon Davies, Medea with Judith Anderson, Hedda Gabler with Joan Plowright, Antony and Cleopatra with Pamela Brown, Sonnets from the Portuguese with Katherine Cornell, Julius Caesar, Titus Andronicus, The Iliad and The Odyssey, and The Merry Wives of Windsor.

== Personal life and death ==
Quayle married twice. His first wife was the actress Hermione Hannen (1913–1983), to whom he was married from 1935 to 1941. In 1947, he married American-born actress Dorothy Hyson (1914–1996), known as "Dot" to family and friends. He and Dorothy had two daughters, Jenny and Rosanna, and a son, Christopher.

Quayle died at his home in Chelsea from liver cancer on 20 October 1989.

== Awards and honours ==
Awards (nominations)

- 1959 – BAFTA Award for Best Actor in a Leading Role, for: Ice Cold in Alex
- 1970 – Golden Globe Award for Best Supporting Actor – Motion Picture, for: Anne of the Thousand Days
- 1970 – Academy Award for Best Supporting Actor, for: Anne of the Thousand Days
- 1981 – Primetime Emmy Award for Outstanding Supporting Actor in a Limited Series or a Special, for: Masada
- 1989 – CableACE Award for Best Actor in a Dramatic or Theatrical Special, for: The Theban Plays by Sophocles

Awards (won)

- 1975 – Primetime Emmy Award for Outstanding Single Performance by a Supporting Actor in a Comedy or Drama Special, for: QB VII

Honours

Quayle was mentioned in despatches during the Second World War. He was appointed a Commander of the Order of the British Empire (CBE) in the 1952 Birthday Honours. He was appointed a Knight Bachelor in the 1985 New Year Honours for services to the Theatre, and knighted by Queen Elizabeth II during a ceremony at Buckingham Palace on 5 March 1985.

== Filmography ==
=== Film ===
Year	Film	Role	Director	Notes
1935	Moscow Nights	Soldier dictating letter	Anthony Asquith	Uncredited
1938	Pygmalion	Eliza's Hairdresser	Leslie Howard	Uncredited
1948	Hamlet	Marcellus	Laurence Olivier	
1948	Saraband for Dead Lovers	Durer	Basil Dearden	
1949	Train of Events	Violinist	Basil Dearden	Uncredited
1955	Oh... Rosalinda!!	Gen. Orlovsky	Powell and Pressburger	
1956	The Battle of the River Plate	Commodore Harwood	Powell and Pressburger	
1956	The Wrong Man	Frank D. O'Connor	Alfred Hitchcock	
1957	Woman in a Dressing Gown	Jim Preston	J. Lee Thompson	
1957	No Time for Tears	Dr. Graham Seagrave	Cyril Frankel	
1958	The Man Who Wouldn't Talk	Dr. Frank Smith	Herbert Wilcox	
1958	Ice Cold in Alex	Captain van der Poel	J. Lee Thompson	
1959	Serious Charge	Howard Phillips	Terence Young	
1959	Tarzan's Greatest Adventure	Slade	John Guillermin	
1960	The Challenge	Jim	John Gilling	
1961	The Guns of Navarone	Maj. Roy Franklin	J. Lee Thompson	
1962	H.M.S. Defiant	Vizard	Lewis Gilbert	
1962	Lawrence of Arabia	Colonel Brighton	David Lean	
1964	The Fall of the Roman Empire	Verulus	Anthony Mann	
1964	East of Sudan	Private Baker	Nathan H. Juran	
1965	Operation Crossbow	Bamford	Michael Anderson	
1965	A Study in Terror	Doctor Murray	James Hill	
1966	The Poppy Is Also a Flower	Captain Vanderbilt	Terence Young	
1966	Misunderstood	Sir John Edward Duncombe	Luigi Comencini	
1969	Mackenna's Gold	Older Englishman	J. Lee Thompson	
1969	Before Winter Comes	Brigadier Bewley	J. Lee Thompson	
1969	Anne of the Thousand Days	Thomas Wolsey	Charles Jarrott	
1972	Everything You Always Wanted to Know About Sex* (*But Were Afraid to Ask)	The King	Woody Allen	
1973	Bequest to the Nation	Lord Minto	James Cellan Jones	
1974	The Tamarind Seed	Jack Loder	Blake Edwards	
1976	The Eagle Has Landed	Admiral Canaris	John Sturges	
1977	Holocaust 2000	Griffith	Alberto De Martino	
1979	Murder by Decree	Sir Charles Warren	Bob Clark	
1988	The Legend of the Holy Drinker	The Distinguished Gentleman	Ermanno Olmi	
1988	Buster	Sir James McDowell	David Green	
1988	Magdalene	Father Noessler	Monica Teuber	Posthumous release
1990	King of the Wind	Lord Granville	Peter Duffell	Posthumous release
1993	The Thief and the Cobbler	King Nod	Richard Williams	Posthumous release, voice, dubbed over by Clive Revill with one scene of his performance left in.

=== Television ===
Year	Film	Role	Director	Notes
1954	Sunday Night Theatre	Othello	—N/a	TV series, 1 episode: "We Live to Please"
1956	Producers' Showcase	Various	Various	TV series, 2 episodes
1958	Suspicion	Graham	Jack Smight	TV series, 1 episode: "The Man with the Gun"
1959–61	Armchair Theatre	Various	Various	TV series, 3 episodes
1961	BBC Sunday-Night Play	The General	Leo Lehmann	TV series, 1 episode: "A Reason for Staying"
1961–65	ITV Play of the Week	Various	Various	TV series, 3 episodes
1963	Man of the World	Dr. Moretti	John Llewellyn Moxey	TV series, 1 episode: "The Enemy"
1964	Drama 64	Samurai	James Ferman	TV series, 1 episode: "Miss Hanago"
1964	Espionage	Philip	Michael Powell	TV series, 1 episode: "A Free Agent"
1964	The Saint	Lord Thornton Yearley	Peter Yates	TV series, 1 episode: "The Noble Sportsman"
1966	Court Martial	Colonel Julian Rodney	Peter Maxwell	TV series, 1 episode: "The House Where He Lived"
1966	Barefoot in Athens	Pausanias	George Schaefer	TV movie
1967	Playhouse	Daniel Bloch	John Gorrie	TV series, 1 episode: "The Waste Spaces"
1968	A Case of Libel	Colonel Douglas	Charles Jarrott	TV movie
1969	Destiny of a Spy	Colonel Malendin	Boris Sagal	TV movie
1969	Red Peppers	Mr. Edwards	Michael Mills	TV movie
1969–70	Strange Report	Adam Strange	Various	TV series
1970	The Six Wives of Henry VIII	Narrator	Naomi Capon; John Glenister	TV series
1973	Jarrett	Cosmo Bastrop	Barry Shear	TV movie
1974	QB VII	Tom Banniester	Tom Gries	Miniseries
1974	Moses the Lawgiver	Aaron	Gianfranco De Bosio	Miniseries
1974	Great Expectations	Jaggers	Joseph Hardy	TV movie
1974–75	The Lives of Benjamin Franklin	Dartmouth	Glenn Jordan	Miniseries, 2 episodes
1976	The Story of David	King Saul	Alex Segal	TV movie
1976	21 Hours at Munich	General Zvi Zamir	William A. Graham	TV movie
1978	BBC2 Play of the Week	The Old Man	David Jones	TV series, 1 episode: "Ice Age"
1979	The First Part of King Henry the Fourth	Sir John Falstaff	David Giles	TV movie
1979	The Second Part of King Henry the Fourth	Sir John Falstaff	David Giles	TV movie
1981	Manions of America	Lord Montgomery	Charles S. Dubin; Joseph Sargent	Miniseries
1981	Masada	Rubrius Gallus	Boris Sagal	Miniseries
1981	Tales of the Unexpected	Kyros Kassoulas	John Gorrie	TV series, 1 episode: "The Last Bottle in the World"
1981	Dial M for Murder	Insp. Hubbard	Boris Sagal	TV movie
1984	Lace	Dr. Geneste	William Hale	Miniseries
1984	The Last Days of Pompeii	Quintus	Peter R. Hunt	Miniseries
1984	The Testament of John	John Douglas	Don Taylor	TV movie
1985	The Key to Rebecca	Abdullah	David Hemmings	TV movie
1986	The Theban plays, by Sophocles	Oedipus	Don Taylor	Miniseries, 1 episode: "Oedipus at Colonus"
1988	The Bourne Identity	Gen. François Villiers	Roger Young	TV movie
1988	Reaching for the Skies	Narrator	—N/a	TV series, documentary
1989	The Endless Game	Glanville	Bryan Forbes	Miniseries, 1 episode
1989	Confessional	The Pope	Gordon Flemyng	Posthumous release, miniseries, 2 episodes

== Books ==
Quayle wrote two novels and an autobiography.

- Eight Hours from England (novel) (1945, Heinemann)
- On Such a Night (novel) (1947, Heinemann)
- The Strange Case of Dr. Jekyll and Mr. Hyde (audiobook), written by Robert Louis Stevenson, read by Anthony Quayle, illustrated by Wayne Anderson (1969, Caedmon)
- A Time to Speak (autobiography) (1990, Barrie & Jenkins)

The first novel is a semi-fictional account of his war service with the S.O.E. in Albania.

== Portrayal ==
Quayle is played by Daniel Evans in Mr Burton, a British biographical drama film about the young Richard Burton.
