= Ron Fuller (artist) =

British artist and toy designer

Ron Fuller (21 August 1936 – 2 July 2017) was a British artist and toy designer. He went to art schools in Plymouth and Falmouth before studying Art and Theatre Design at the Royal College of Art. After a career in teaching he began making wooden toys for a living in 1972. His work was highly sought after and has been exhibited and sold in specialist shops all over the world.

Fuller was involved with Cabaret Mechanical Theatre for over 10 years and produced a number of designs exclusively for CMT. A larger-than-life-size cooper that Fuller made can be seen working at a beer barrel on the roof of a pub that overlooks Trafalgar Square.
