= Tim Hunkin =

English engineer, cartoonist and writer

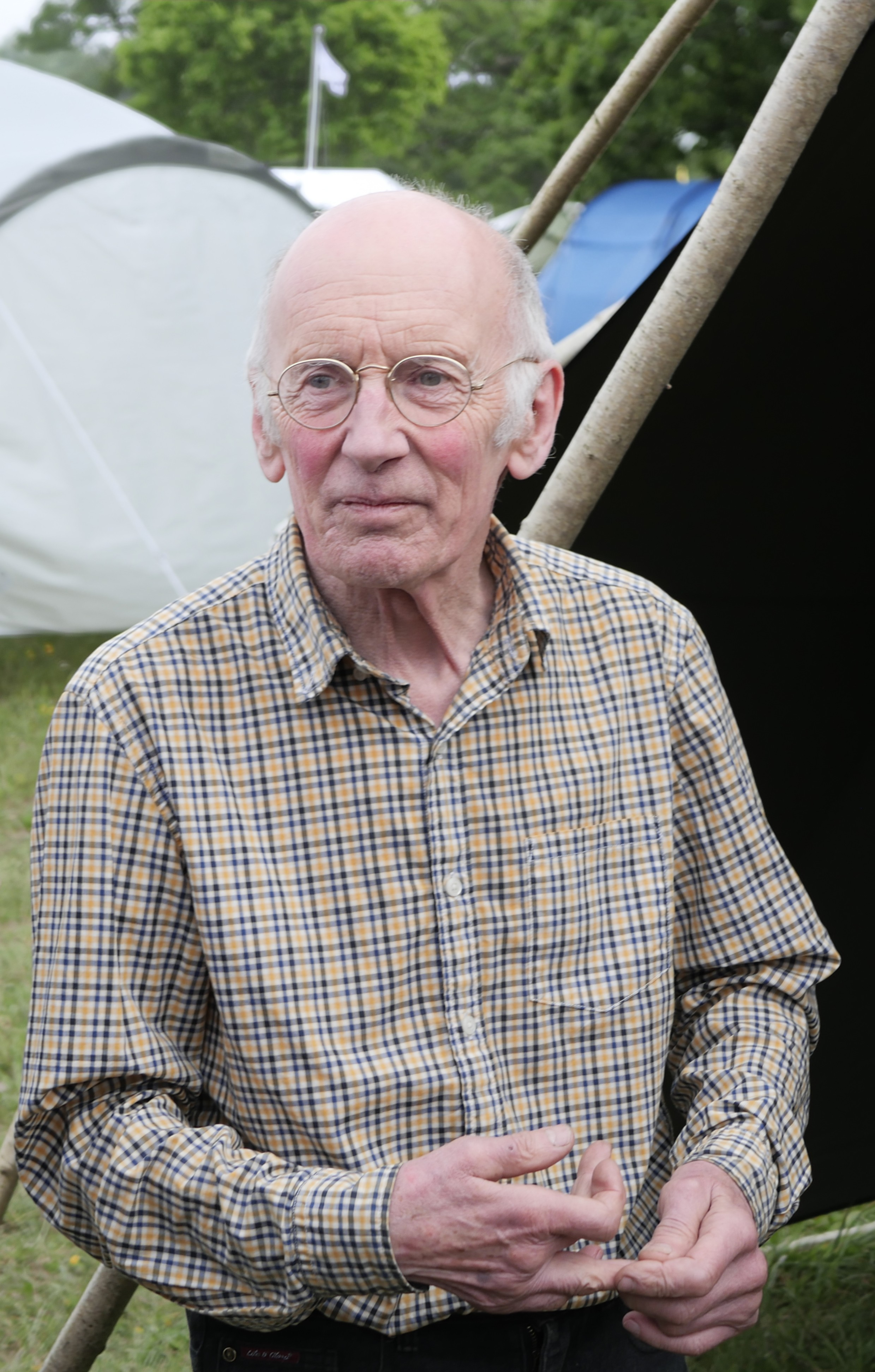
- Tim Hunkin at Electromagnetic Field in 2024
- Born: Timothy Mark Trelawney Hunkin; 27 December 1950 (age 75); Hammersmith, London, England
- Education: University of Cambridge
- Known for: The Secret Life of Machines; Under the Pier Show
- Scientific career
- Fields: Engineering; Cartoons
- Website: timhunkin.com

Timothy Mark Trelawney Hunkin (born 27 December 1950 in London) is an English engineer, cartoonist, writer, and artist living in Suffolk, England. He is best known for creating the Channel Four television series The Secret Life of Machines, in which he explains the workings and history of various household devices. He has also created museum exhibits for institutions across the UK, and designed numerous public engineering works, chiefly for entertainment. Hunkin's works are distinctive, often recognisable by his unique style of papier-mâché sculpture (made from unpainted newsprint), his pen and ink cartoons, and his offbeat sense of humour.

== Education ==
Hunkin enrolled in 1969, and graduated in engineering science from Gonville and Caius College, Cambridge in 1972.

== Work and career ==
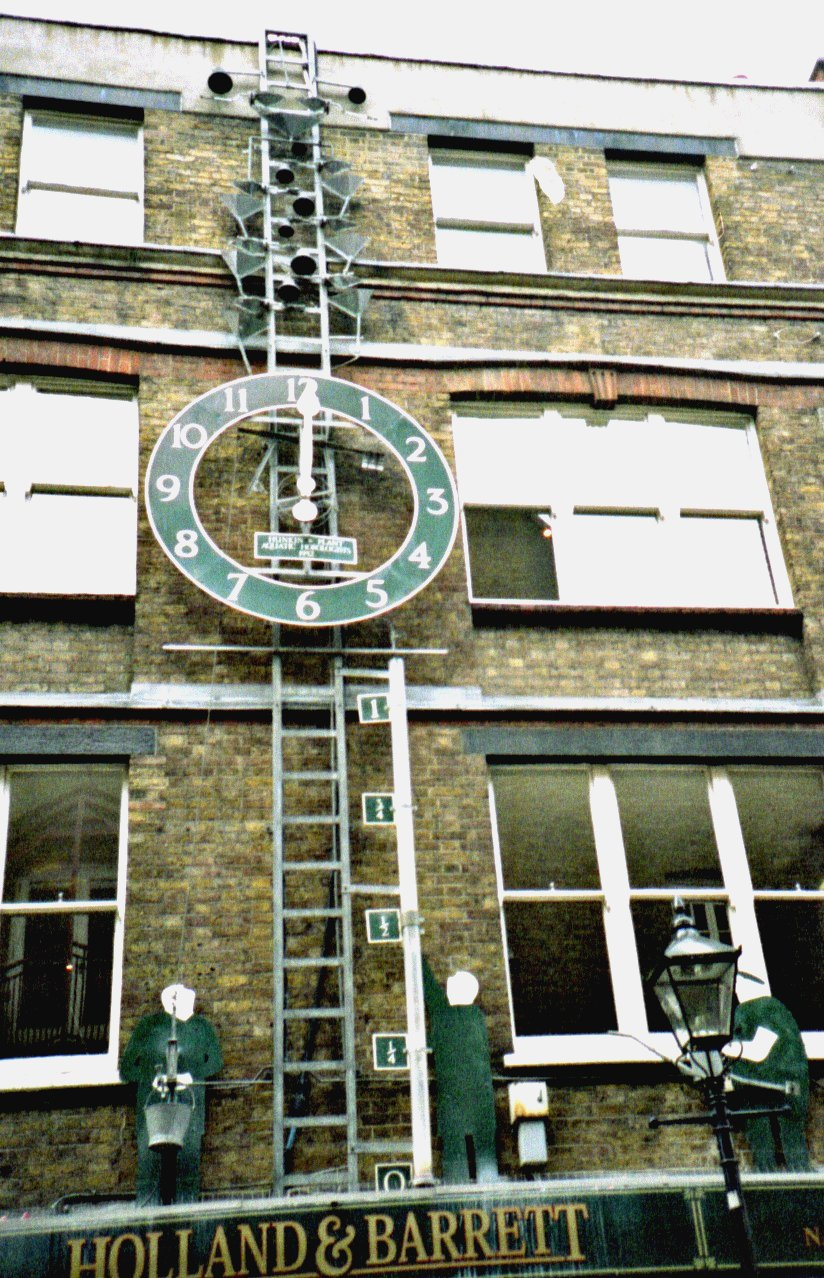
A water clock in Covent Garden built by Tim Hunkin and Andy Plant

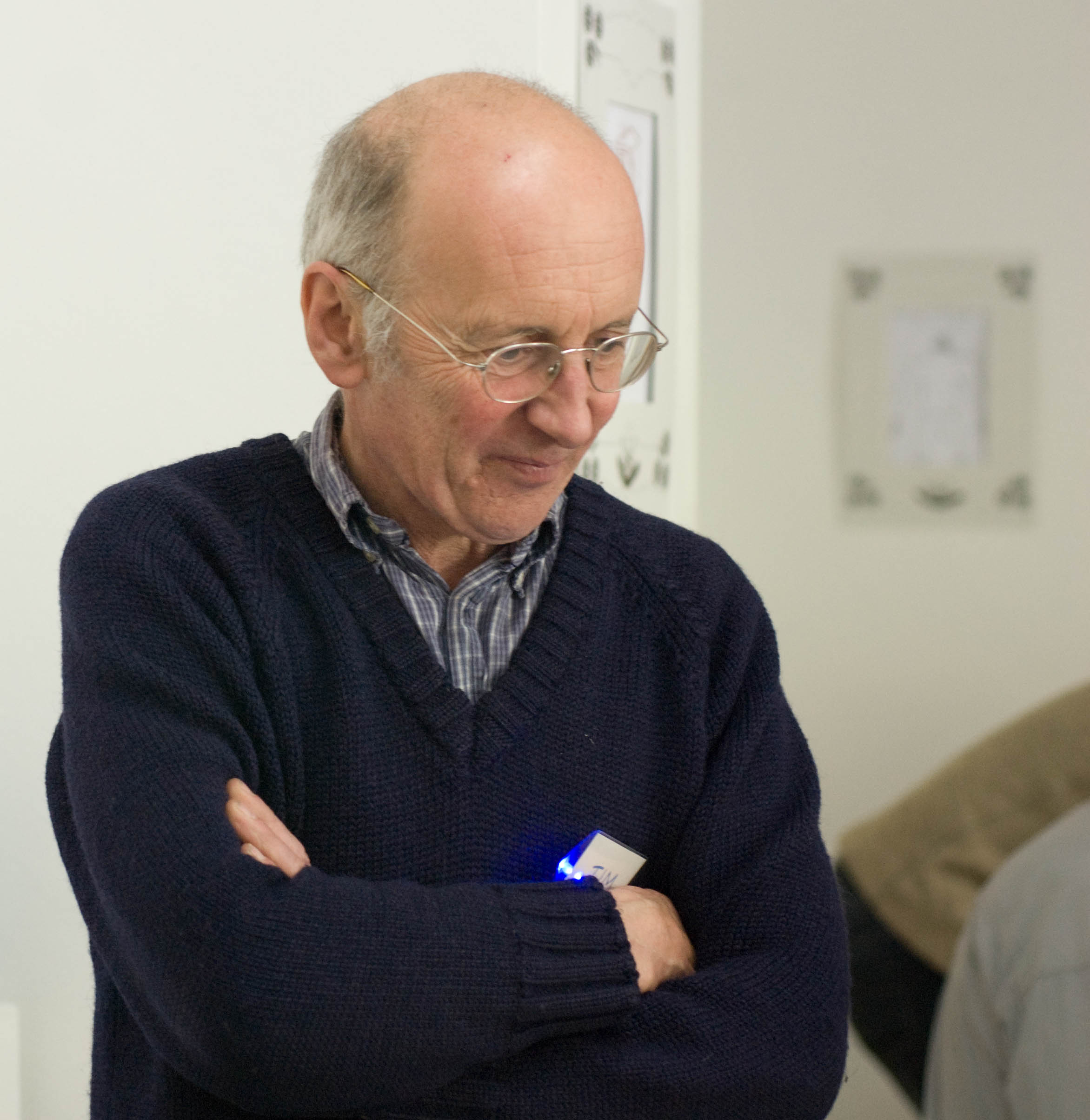
Tim Hunkin in 2010

Hunkin's Under the Pier Show at Southwold Pier, England, is a penny arcade featuring a number of humorous, coin-operated machines of his creation. Attractions include the "Autofrisk" (a device that simulates the experience of being frisked by multiple, inflated rubber gloves), the "Bathyscape" (a device that simulates a brief submarine adventure) and a somewhat rude sculptural clock. Hunkin has also opened Novelty Automation, an amusement arcade in Holborn, London, which has a more satirical tone, of which Hunkin has said "I don’t think political art has an enormous effect, but in the short term it is satisfying to reinforce people’s disrespect of the villains."

Many of his other projects are large-scale and theatrical, including gigantic clocks of unconventional designs, bonfires and pyrotechnic displays. In 1976, he designed the flying pigs and sheep for rock band Pink Floyd's In The Flesh tour, promoting their Animals album.

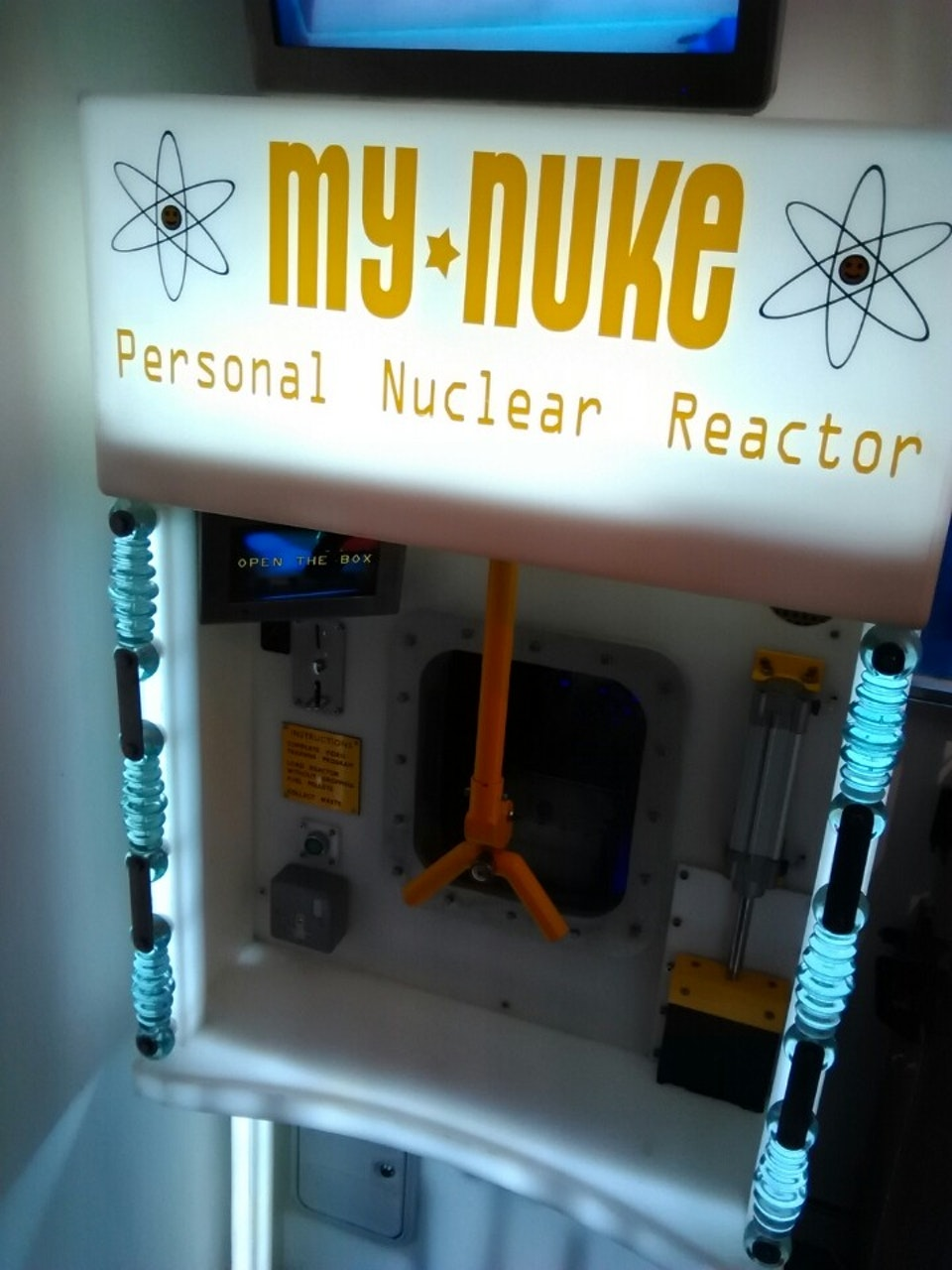
"My Nuke" arcade game at Novelty Automation

His displays are also featured in episodes of The Secret Life of Machines and relate to the machine covered by the programmes. These included a mountain of flaming televisions; flying vacuum cleaners fitted with rocket motors; a carhenge; a ballet of self-propelled portable radios; and a bizarre "pilgrimage" of an internal combustion engine carried, shoulder high, on a bier into the centre of Carhenge. The Pink Floyd inflatable pig was also featured in the vacuum cleaner episode. Other displays featured in the series were more informative, such as a free-standing central heating system and a "human sewing machine." The programmes also include his cartoons in voiced and animated form.

In the early 1990s, Hunkin was commissioned by the Science Museum to create the Secret Life of the Home gallery, showcasing various household appliances and interactive exhibits. The gallery closed after 29 years on June 2 2024.

In 2013 he created a large, unfolding clock for the San Francisco Exploratorium.

During the 2020 COVID-19 pandemic Hunkin was inspired by other creators online to make a new series called The Secret Life of Components that was distributed on YouTube beginning in March 2021. A second installment was distributed beginning 30 March 2022.

=== Books ===
Hunkin has published several books in his distinctive cartoon style. His first was a children's book, Mrs Gronkwonk and the Post Office Tower (ISBN 978-0207955006) in 1973, which he recently made available again at Lulu.com. In 1988 he published Almost Everything There Is To Know, a compilation of his comic strip The Rudiments of Wisdom, first published in The Observer. He is also the author of the book Hunkin's Experiments which describes a variety of science-based pranks, games, and curiosities. Content from both books is freely available online.

== See also ==
- Sam Smith (toy-maker)
- Wilf Lunn
- Heinz Wolff
- Johnny Ball
- Adam Hart-Davis
