= 2019 in England =

- Centuries: 19th; 20th; 21st
- Decades: 1990s; 2000s; 2010s; 2020s
- See also: 2018–19 in English football 2019–20 in English football 2019 in the United Kingdom; Other events of 2019

Events from 2019 in England

== Incumbent ==
- Monarch - Elizabeth II
- Prime Minister - Theresa May (until 24 July), Boris Johnson (from 24 July)

== Events ==
=== January ===
- 1 January
  - A ban on the purchasing of fax machines by the NHS in England, as part of a government plan to phase them out entirely by March 2020 commences.
  - A new energy price cap has now come into effect for households in England, Scotland and Wales. Ofgem, the energy supply regulator, has estimated that it would save 11 million people an average of £76 a year if they stay on the same tariff. Data from the regulator also shows that the cap could lead to households being more than £200 per year worse off because of the reduction in the number of customers shopping around because of the cap.
- 2 January – Missed GP appointments 'cost NHS England £216m'.
- 4 January – The engineering arm of collapsed Monarch Airlines falls into administration, with the loss of 450 jobs.
- 7 January – a 10-year plan for England's National Health Service is unveiled by NHS England chief executive Simon Stevens and prime minister Teresa May.
- 17 January – The 97-year-old Duke of Edinburgh, Prince Philip is involved in a car crash while driving near the Queen's Sandringham estate. He is unhurt, "but very, very shocked and shaken".
- 22 January – The UK café chain Patisserie Valerie collapses into administration after rescue talks with banks fail.
- 29 January – Labour MP for Peterborough Fiona Onasanya is sentenced to three months imprisonment having earlier been found guilty of perverting the course of justice for lying about who was driving her car when caught speeding. Her imprisonment makes her the first sitting MP to be jailed in 28 years.

=== February ===
- 5 February – HMV has been acquired out of administration by Canadian retailer Sunrise Records, safeguarding the future of nearly 1,500 staff.
- 7 February
  - The Office for National Statistics reports that knife crime in England and Wales is at its highest level since records began in 1946, with the number of fatal stabbings the previous year being the most ever reported.
  - The British Horseracing Authority (BHA) cancels all horse racing in Great Britain until at least 13 February after an outbreak of equine influenza.
  - A body is recovered from the wreckage of the PA-46 Malibu which vanished over the English Channel on 21 January. Dorset Police later identify it as that of Emiliano Sala.
- 13 February – Ford reveals it is preparing to move its car engine production out of Britain, as a result of Brexit disruption, putting thousands of jobs at risk.
- 18 February
  - Seven MPs – Chuka Umunna, Luciana Berger, Chris Leslie, Angela Smith, Mike Gapes, Gavin Shuker and Ann Coffey – announce that they have resigned from the Labour Party to form The Independent Group.
  - Plans by Japanese carmaker Honda to close its Swindon factory by 2022 are leaked to the press, a day before the official announcement.
- 19 February – MP Joan Ryan resigns from the Labour Party to join The Independent Group.
- 20 February Three Conservative Party MPs – Heidi Allen, Sarah Wollaston and Anna Soubry – resign from their party to join The Independent Group.
- 22 February – Dudley North MP Ian Austin resigns from the Labour Party and claims the party has failure to tackle antisemitism, but says he has no plans to join the Independent Group.
- 23 February
  - Health Secretary Matt Hancock tells the NHS to stop using pagers for communications, calling them "outdated" and stating his wish to get rid of "archaic technology like pagers and fax machines" within the NHS by 2021.
  - Roy Hodgson becomes the oldest man to manage in the Premier League, at the age of 71 years and 198 days.

=== March ===
- 6 March – Following what she characterised as a spate of knife murders involving young people around England, the chair of the National Police Chiefs' Council, Sara Thornton, calls for the situation to be treated as a national emergency.
- 19 March – The head of the Environment Agency, Sir James Bevan warned that England will not have enough water to meet demand within 25 years and the impact of climate change, combined with population growth, means the country is facing an "existential threat" at the Waterwise Conference.

=== April ===
- 2 April – The Tulip, a new 305-metre (1,000 ft) skyscraper in the City of London, featuring an observation platform with rotating pods, is granted planning approval.
- 3 April – Prosecutors seek a retrial in the case of Hillsborough match commander David Duckenfield, after a jury fails to reach a verdict.
- 4 April – A water leak shortly before 3pm suspends proceedings in the House of Commons for the rest of the day.
- 6 April – Tiger Roll wins the 2019 Grand National, the second consecutive year the horse has won the race.
- 8 April
  - Jaguar Land Rover shuts down production for a week because of uncertainties around Brexit.
  - London's Ultra Low Emission Zone comes into effect.
- 9 April – Department store Debenhams goes into administration, after a last-ditch rescue offer from Mike Ashley's Sports Direct was rejected.
- 11 April – WikiLeaks co-founder Julian Assange is arrested after seven years in Ecuador's embassy in London.
- 12 April – Former UKIP leader Nigel Farage launches the Brexit Party.
- 15–22 April – Demonstrations by the climate change activist group Extinction Rebellion cause disruption in central London, blocking roads and resulting in over 1,000 arrests, with 53 people charged for various offences. A "pause" in the protest is announced on 21 April, although the group continues to base itself in Marble Arch.
- 17 April – The UK Government announces it will introduce an age verification system designed to stop internet users under the age of eighteen from viewing pornographic websites, which will come into force on 15 July.
- 18 April – 29-year-old journalist and author Lyra McKee is shot dead amid rioting in Derry, Northern Ireland, with police treating it as a "terrorist incident" and suspecting the New IRA.
- 22 April
  - Leaders from 70 local Conservative Associations sign a petition calling for a vote of no confidence in Theresa May. The non-binding vote, to be determined by 800 of the party's senior officials, would be the first time such an instance has occurred.
  - The hottest Easter Monday on record in all four nations of the UK is confirmed by the Met Office, with 25 °C (77 °F) reported at Heathrow, Northolt and Wisley.
- 23 April – Buckingham Palace confirms that US President Donald Trump will make a three-day state visit to the UK from 3 to 5 June. President Trump previously visited the UK from 12 to 15 July 2018, amid major protests.
- 24 April – The Conservative Party's 1922 Committee votes against changing the party's rules regarding leadership challenges, but asks for clarity on when Prime Minister Theresa May will step down from office.
- 25 April –
  - The government announces it will launch a formal inquiry into the leaking of discussions about Chinese telecommunications firm Huawei at the National Security Council after The Daily Telegraph published details of a meeting concerning plans to use the firm to help build the 5G network.
  - The Foreign Office warns against all but essential travel to Sri Lanka following the Easter Sunday bombings in which eight Britons were among the dead.
- 26 April –
  - Prime Minister Theresa May and Irish Taoiseach Leo Varadkar issue a joint statement setting out a new process of talks designed to restore devolution to Northern Ireland, and to begin on 7 May.
  - Department store Debenhams announces plans to close 22 branches in 2019.
  - Labour leader Jeremy Corbyn declines an invitation to attend a state banquet at Buckingham Palace to honour US President Donald Trump during his state visit in June.

=== May ===
- 1 May
  - WikiLeaks co-founder Julian Assange is sentenced to 50 weeks in jail for breaching bail conditions.
  - Peterborough Member of Parliament Fiona Onasanya becomes the first MP to be removed by a recall petition after 19,261 of her constituents voted for her to be removed from office. Onasanya's recall petition had been automatically triggered as a result of her conviction for perverting the course of justice, an offence for which she was imprisoned in January.
  - Defence Secretary Gavin Williamson is sacked, after a leak from a National Security Council meeting, in which plans by Chinese firm Huawei to contribute to the UK's 5G network were discussed. He is replaced by Penny Mordaunt.
- 2 May – 2019 United Kingdom local elections: The Lib Dems, Greens and independents make gains in the local elections at the expense of the Conservatives, while Labour and UKIP also suffer losses.
- 4 May – The Metropolitan Police says that the National Security Council leak about Huawei "did not amount to a criminal offence".
- 6 May
  - The Duchess of Sussex gives birth to a son, Archie Mountbatten-Windsor.
  - The World Snooker Championship concludes with Judd Trump defeating John Higgins 18–9 in final to win his first world title.
- 8 May – A British teenager, Isabelle Holdaway, 17, is reported to be the first patient to receive a genetically modified phage therapy to treat a drug-resistant infection.
- 9 May – Broadcaster Danny Baker is fired from BBC Radio 5 Live after tweeting a "royal baby" image of a chimpanzee.
- 13 May – The Jeremy Kyle Show is suspended indefinitely following the death of a participant, shortly after appearing on an unbroadcast programme. The show is axed by ITV two days later.
- 16 May
  - Following information provided by police, the Bishop of Lincoln, Christopher Lowson, is suspended from office by the Archbishop of Canterbury.
  - Boris Johnson confirms that he will run for the Conservative Party leadership after Theresa May stands down.
- 17 May
  - Brexit talks between Labour and the Conservatives end without agreement, following six weeks of cross-party debate, with Jeremy Corbyn saying negotiations have "gone as far as they can".
  - The Ministry of Justice announces plans to introduce "Helen's Law", which would require a person convicted of murder without the presence of a body to reveal the location of their victim's remains before being considered for parole.
- 18 May
  - Manchester City become the first men's football team to win the English domestic treble – the Premier League, FA Cup and EFL Cup in the same season – after beating Watford 6–0 in the FA Cup final.
  - Inter-City 125 High Speed Trains end services to the West country after 43 years of operation.
- 21 May
  - Jamie Oliver's restaurant group collapses into administration, putting 1,300 jobs at risk.
- 22 May
  - The government announces it will introduce new controls on single use plastic products in England from April 2020.
  - British Steel enters insolvency, putting 5,000 UK jobs directly at risk and a further 20,000 in the supply chain, following a breakdown in rescue talks between the government and the company's owner, Greybull.
  - Andrea Leadsom resigns as Leader of the House of Commons, saying she no longer believes the government's approach will deliver Brexit.
- 24 May – Prime Minister Theresa May announces her resignation as Conservative Party leader, effective 7 June.
- 26 May – The first black female Oxbridge master, Sonia Alleyne, is appointed to lead Jesus College, Cambridge, from October.
- 28 May
  - Alastair Campbell, the former communications chief to Tony Blair, is expelled from the Labour Party, after publicly stating that he voted for the Liberal Democrats during the European Parliamentary elections.
  - The Speaker, John Bercow announces that he plans to possibly stay on as Speaker of the House until 2022, saying it is not "sensible to vacate the chair" while there are major issues before parliament.

=== June ===
- 1 June – A ban on letting agent fees comes into effect.
- 6 June – Peterborough by election: Labour retains the seat, with the Brexit Party finishing second, and the Conservatives in third place. The by-election was held because of the previous Labour MP having been removed as the result of a recall petition.
- 7 June – Prime Minister Theresa May resigns as Leader of the Conservative Party, paving the way for a leadership contest.
- 8 June – Tory leadership candidate Michael Gove says he "deeply regrets" taking cocaine at several "social events" more than 20 years previously.
- 10 June – The BBC announces it will stop free television licences, for over-75s who do not get pension credit, from June 2020. It follows a consultation with 190,000 people, of whom 52% were in favour of reforming or abolishing free licences.
- 13 June – Independent MP Chuka Umunna joins the Liberal Democrats.

=== August ===
- 1 August – Parts of the Derbyshire towns of Whaley Bridge, Furness Vale and New Mills are evacuated, with 1,500 residents being moved as a precaution, after concrete slabs on the dam spillway of the Toddbrook Reservoir partially collapse.

=== October ===
- 13 October – The nineteenth-century English cardinal John Henry Newman is canonised by the Pope, the first new English saint in more than 50 years.

=== November ===
- 8 November – heavy rainfall leads to flooding in northern areas, specifically of the Don (in Doncaster) and Derwent in Matlock.

=== December ===
- 22 December – Inter-City 125 High Speed Trains end services to the North East and Scotland after 41 years of operation.

== Deaths ==
=== January ===
- 1 January
  - Katie Flynn, 82, British novelist.
- 2 January
  - Bill Elsey, 97, British racehorse trainer (Epsom Oaks, St Leger Stakes).
  - Julia Grant, 64, British trans woman pioneer (A Change of Sex).
- 3 January
  - Joe Casely-Hayford, 62, British fashion designer, cancer.
  - Jack Fennell, 85, English rugby league footballer (Featherstone Rovers).
- 4 January – Frank Mugglestone, 94, English rugby league footballer (Bradford Northern, Castleford).
- 5 January – Eric Haydock, 75, British bassist (The Hollies).
- 6 January
  - Derek Foster, Baron Foster of Bishop Auckland, 81, British politician, MP for Bishop Auckland (1979–2005) and member of the House of Lords (since 2005), cancer.
  - Derek Piggott, 96, British glider pilot and flight instructor, stroke.
- 7 January – Laurie Gilfedder, 83, English rugby league footballer (Great Britain, Lancashire, Warrington, Wigan, Leigh).
- 9 January – Ron Smith, 94, British comic artist (Judge Dredd).
- 10 January – Dianne Oxberry, 51, English broadcaster and weather presenter for the BBC regional news programme BBC North West Tonight.
- 11 January
  - Sir Michael Atiyah, 89, British mathematician, President of the Royal Society (1990–1995).
  - Nigel Gawthorpe, 61, English politician, Mayor of Cambridge (since 2018), scuba diving accident.
- 14 January – Duncan Welbourne, 78, English footballer (Watford).
- 23 January – Diana Athill, 101, British literary editor and novelist.
- 25 January – Nigel Saddington, 53, English footballer (Doncaster Rovers, Carlisle United, Gateshead).
- 27 January
  - Sir Reginald Eyre, 94, British politician, MP for Birmingham Hall Green (1965–1987).
  - Mike Harrison, 78, English footballer (Chelsea, Blackburn Rovers, Luton Town).
- 28 January – Noel Rawsthorne, 89, British organist and composer.
- 29 January – Martha Ross, 80, British actress (EastEnders, Grange Hill) and radio presenter.
- 30 January
  - Stewart Adams, 95, British chemist, developed ibuprofen.
  - Duncan Weldon, 77, English theatre producer.
- 31 January – Dennis Hunt, 81, English football player (Gillingham, Brentford) and manager (Ashford Town).

=== February ===
- 1 February
  - Tim Elkington, 98, British Royal Air Force fighter pilot, member of The Few.
  - Jeremy Hardy, 57, English comedian (The News Quiz, I'm Sorry I Haven't a Clue, Jeremy Hardy Speaks to the Nation), cancer.
- 3 February – Danny Williams, 94, English football player (Rotherham United) and manager (Swindon Town, Sheffield Wednesday).
- 4 February
  - Colin Barker, 79, British sociologist and historian.
  - Matt Brazier, 42, English footballer (QPR, Cardiff City, Leyton Orient), non-Hodgkin follicular lymphoma.
- 9 February
  - Cadet, 28, British rap artist.
  - Fred Pickering, 78, English footballer (Blackburn Rovers, Everton, national team).
  - Ian Ross, 72, English footballer (Liverpool, Aston Villa, Peterborough United).
- 10 February – Roderick MacFarquhar, 88, British politician, journalist and historian.
- 12 February
  - Gordon Banks, 81, English footballer (Leicester City, Stoke City, national team), world champion (1966).
  - Austin Rhodes, 81, English rugby league footballer (St Helens, Leigh) and coach (Swinton).
- 13 February – Eric Harrison, 81, English football player (Halifax Town) and coach (Manchester United).
- 14 February
  - Andrea Levy, 62, English novelist (Small Island, The Long Song).
  - Simon P. Norton, 66, English mathematician, heart disease.
- 15 February – John Stalker, 79, police officer, Deputy Chief Constable of Greater Manchester Police (1984–1987).
- 20 February – Bruno Schroder, 86, British banker (Schroders).
- 21 February – Edward Enfield, 89, British television and radio presenter, and newspaper journalist.
- 25 February
  - Mark Hollis, 64, English singer-songwriter (Talk Talk).
  - Kenneth Pitt, 96, British publicist and talent manager (David Bowie).
- 26 February
  - Andy Anderson, 68, English drummer (The Cure, The Glove, Steve Hillage).
  - Peter Fox, 85, English rugby league player (Batley Bulldogs) and coach (Featherstone Rovers, Bradford Northern).
  - Tony Honoré, 96, British lawyer and jurist.
- 27 February – Doug Sandom, 89, English drummer (The Who).
- 28 February – Peter Dolby, 78, English footballer (Shrewsbury Town).

=== March ===
- 1 March
  - Kumar Bhattacharyya, Baron Bhattacharyya, 78, British-Indian engineer, educator and government advisor, member of the House of Lords (since 2004).
  - Paul Williams, 78, English singer (Zoot Money's Big Roll Band, Juicy Lucy, Allan Holdsworth).
- 3 March – Danny Williams, 94, English football player (Rotherham United) and manager (Swindon Town, Sheffield Wednesday).
- 4 March – Keith Flint, 49, English singer, musician and dancer (The Prodigy).
- 6 March
  - Magenta Devine, 61, British television presenter (Rough Guide, Network 7).
  - Mike Grose, British bassist (Queen).
  - John Habgood, 91, British Anglican bishop, academic, and life peer, Bishop of Durham (1973–1983), Archbishop of York (1983–1995).
- 7 March Robert Braithwaite, 75, British marine engineer and entrepreneur, founder of Sunseeker.
- 8 March
  - Jack Lyon, 101, British RAF pilot, member of the Great Escape.
  - Mike Watterson, 76, English snooker player, promoter and commentator.
- 9 March
  - Tom Ballard, 30, British rock climber. (body discovered on this date)
  - Johnny Brittain, 86–87, British motorcycle racer. (death announced on this date)
- 11 March – Danny Kustow, 69, English rock guitarist (Tom Robinson Band).
- 12 March – John Richardson, 95, British art historian, biographer of Picasso.
- 13 March – Keith Butler, 80, British racing cyclist.
- 14 March
  - Paul Hutchins, 73, British tennis player.
  - Charlie Whiting, 66, British motorsports director, FIA Formula 1 race director (since 1997).
- 15 March
  - Derek Lewin, 88, English footballer (Bishop Auckland, Great Britain Olympic football team).
  - Ron Peplow, 83, English footballer (Brentford).
  - Mike Thalassitis, 26, British footballer (Stevenage) and reality television star (Love Island, Celebs Go Dating).
- 19 March
  - Rose Hilton, 87, British painter.
  - Mary Warnock, Baroness Warnock, 94, British philosopher.
- 23 March – Victor Hochhauser, 95, Slovak-born British music promoter.
- 26 March
  - Ted Burgin, 91, British football player (Sheffield United, Leeds United, Rochdale) and manager.
  - Ranking Roger, 56, British singer (The Beat, General Public), cancer.
- 28 March – Kevin Randall, 73, English footballer and manager (Chesterfield, York City).
- 29 March – Shane Rimmer, 89, Canadian-born British actor (Thunderbirds, Dr. Strangelove, The Spy Who Loved Me), cancer.
- 30 March – Tania Mallet, 77, English model and actress (Goldfinger).

=== April ===
- 1 April – Michael William Feast, 92, British-born South African astronomer.
- 2 April – Bill Heine, 74, American-born British radio broadcaster (BBC Radio Oxford), leukaemia.
- 7 April – Sandy Ratcliff, 70, English actress (EastEnders).
- 8 April – Rex Garrod, 75, inventor, roboteer (Brum, Robot Wars) and television presenter (The Secret Life of Machines), complications from Alzheimer's disease.
- 11 April – Ian Cognito, 60, English stand-up comedian.
- 12 April – Tommy Smith, 74, English professional footballer.
- 13 March
  - Keith Butler, 80, British racing cyclist.
  - Edmund Capon, 78, British-Australian art historian.
- 14 March
  - John Hellawell, 75, English footballer (Bradford City).
  - Paul Hutchins, 73, British tennis player.
  - Sir Stanley Peart, 96, doctor and medical researcher.
  - Charlie Whiting, 66, British motorsports director, FIA Formula 1 race director (since 1997).
- 15 March
  - Derek Burke, 89, academic.
  - Alec Coppen, 96, psychiatrist.
  - Derek Lewin, 88, English footballer (Bishop Auckland, Great Britain Olympic football team).
  - Ron Peplow, 83, English footballer (Brentford).
  - Mike Thalassitis, 26, British footballer (Stevenage) and reality television star (Love Island, Celebs Go Dating), suicide.
- 17 March – Mick Murphy, 77, English rugby player (St. Helens, Leigh).
- 18 March – Roy McDowell, 71, Scottish footballer (Berwick Rangers). (death announced on this date)
- 19 March
  - Derek Anthony, 71, military officer, Flag Officer Scotland, Northern England and Northern Ireland (2000–2003).
  - Graham Arnold, 86, English artist.
  - Tony Greenfield, 87, statistician.
  - Rose Hilton, 87, British painter.
  - Fraser Robertson, 47, Scottish sports journalist (Sky Sports, STV).
  - Mary Warnock, Baroness Warnock, 94, British philosopher.
- 21 March – Gordon Hill, 90, English football referee.
- 22 March – Scott Walker, 76, American-born British singer-songwriter (The Walker Brothers), composer and record producer.
- 23 March – Victor Hochhauser, 95, Slovak-born British music promoter.
- 24 March
  - James Barclay, 86, Scottish playwright and novelist, lung cancer.
  - Brian MacArthur, 79, newspaper editor and writer, leukaemia.
- 25 March
  - Edna Barker, 82, English cricketer.
  - Barrie Hole, 76, Welsh footballer (Cardiff City, Aston Villa, national team).
- 26 March
  - Ted Burgin, 91, British football player (Sheffield United, Leeds United, Rochdale) and manager.
  - Ranking Roger, 56, British singer (The Beat, General Public), cancer.
- 28 March – Kevin Randall, 73, English footballer and manager (Chesterfield, York City).
- 29 March – Shane Rimmer, 89, Canadian-born British actor (Thunderbirds, Dr. Strangelove, The Spy Who Loved Me), cancer.
- 30 March
  - Tania Mallet, 77, English model and actress (Goldfinger).
  - Jim Russell, 98, English racing driver.

=== April ===
- 1 April – Michael William Feast, 92, British-born South African astronomer.
- 2 April
  - Martin Fido, 79, crime writer, fall.
  - Bill Heine, 74, American-born British radio broadcaster (BBC Radio Oxford), leukaemia.
  - Harry Judge, 90, English educational theorist.
- 3 April – Billy Mainwaring, 78, Welsh rugby union player (Aberavon, Bridgend, national team).
- 6 April – David J. Thouless, 84, physicist, Nobel Prize laureate (2016).
- 7 April
  - Mya-Lecia Naylor, 16, English actress (Millie Inbetween).
  - Willie McPheat, 76, Scottish footballer (Sunderland, Hartlepool United, Airdrieonians).
  - Sandy Ratcliff, 70, English actress (EastEnders).
- 8 April
  - Clive Cohen, 73, English Anglican priest.
  - Rex Garrod, 75, inventor, roboteer (Brum, Robot Wars) and television presenter (The Secret Life of Machines), complications from Alzheimer's disease.
  - Sir Alexander Reid, 3rd Baronet, 86, English aristocrat and public servant.
- 11 April
  - Ian Cognito, 60, English stand-up comedian, heart attack.
  - Una-Mary Parker, 89, English journalist and novelist.
- 12 April
  - Ivor Broadis, 96, English footballer (Carlisle United, Newcastle United).
  - John McEnery, 76, English actor (Romeo and Juliet, Nicholas and Alexandra, The Land That Time Forgot) and writer.
  - Paul Rawlinson, 56, lawyer, head of Baker McKenzie (since 2016).
  - Tommy Smith, 74, English professional footballer, dementia.
- 13 April
  - Tony Buzan, 76, English author and educational consultant.
  - Winifred Jordan, 99, English sprinter.
  - Paul Raymond, 73, English musician (Plastic Penny, UFO, Savoy Brown), heart attack.
- 14 April – Colin Collindridge, 98, English footballer (Sheffield United, Nottingham Forest).
- 15 April
  - Sir Roger Moate, 80, politician, MP (1970–1997), cancer.
  - Les Reed, 83, English songwriter ("It's Not Unusual", "Delilah, "The Last Waltz") and musician.
- 17 April – Sir Clive Rose, 97, diplomat.
- 18 April
  - John Bowen, 94, writer.
- 19 April
  - Philip Liner, 93, British-born New Zealand radio broadcaster (National Radio).
  - Michael Yorke, 80, Anglican priest, Dean of Lichfield (1999–2005).
- 20 April
  - Joe Armstrong, 68, computer scientist, designer of Erlang.
  - Charlie Kelsall, 98, Welsh footballer (Wrexham).
- 21 April – Doreen Spooner, 91, photographer.
- 23 April
  - George Haigh, 103, English footballer.
  - Edward Kelsey, 88, English actor (The Archers, Danger Mouse (1981 TV series)).
  - Terry Rawlings, 85–86, film editor (Alien, Blade Runner, Chariots of Fire).
  - Peter Skipper, 61, English footballer (Hull City), complications from a stroke.
  - David Winters, 80, English-American actor and choreographer (West Side Story).
- 25 April – Sir Nigel Seely, 95, English aristocrat.
- 27 April – Joseph Ward, 76, English tenor.
- 29 April
  - Betty Lockwood, Baroness Lockwood, 95, political activist and life peer, Member of the House of Lords (1978–2007).
  - John Llewellyn Moxey, 94, Argentinian-born British director (The City of the Dead, Foxhole in Cairo, Circus of Fear).
- 30 April
  - Boon Gould, 64, English musician (Level 42).
  - Peter Mayhew, 74, English-American actor (Star Wars), heart attack.

=== May ===
- 2 May
  - Lord Toby Jug, 53, politician.
  - David Gordon Wilson, 91, British-born American professor of engineering.
- 3 May – Sir Peter Herbert, 90, admiral.
- 4 May – Tommy Sopwith, 86, racing driver and businessman.
- 6 May
  - Jack Cohen, 85, scientist and author.
  - Ted Witherden, 97, English cricketer.
- 9 May
  - Walter Harris, 93, author and broadcaster.
  - Freddie Starr, 76, English comedian, heart disease.
  - Micky Steele-Bodger, 93, English rugby union player (Harlequin, Barbarian).
  - Dan van der Vat, Dutch-born British journalist and naval historian.
  - Brian Walden, 86, journalist and broadcaster (Weekend World) and politician, MP (1964–1977), emphysema.
- 10 May
  - Jon Gittens, 55, English footballer (Swindon Town, Portsmouth, Exeter City).
  - Richard L. Hills, 82, English historian and clergyman.
  - Gordon Neate, 78, English footballer (Reading).
- 11 May
  - Melissa Ede, 58, English transgender campaigner and social media personality, heart attack.
  - Nan Winton, 93, broadcaster, first woman to read BBC News on television, fall.
- 12 May
  - Doug McAvoy, 80, trade union leader, General Secretary of the National Union of Teachers (1989–2004).
  - Alan Skirton, 80, English footballer (Bath City, Arsenal), Alzheimer's disease.
- 14 May – Tommy Donbavand, 53, English children's author (Scream Street) and actor, throat and lung cancer.
- 15 May
  - Kenneth Newing, 95, Anglican prelate, Bishop of Plymouth (1982–1988).
  - John Ronane, 85, actor (Strangers).
- 16 May – Geoff Toseland, 88, English footballer (Sunderland).
- 18 May – Sir Timothy Kitson, 88, politician, MP for Richmond, North Yorkshire (1959–1983).
- 20 May
  - Andrew Hall, 65, English actor (Butterflies, Casualty, Coronation Street).
  - John Moore, Baron Moore of Lower Marsh, 81, politician, MP (1974–1992).
- 21 May – Royce Mills, 77, English actor (History of the World, Part I, Up the Chastity Belt, Doctor Who).
- 22 May
  - Maurice Bamford, 83, English rugby league player and coach (Wigan Warriors, Leeds Rhinos, Great Britain).
  - Judith Kerr, 95, German-born writer and illustrator (The Tiger Who Came to Tea, Mog).
- 24 May – Edmund Morris, 78, Kenyan-born British-American writer (The Rise of Theodore Roosevelt, Dutch: A Memoir of Ronald Reagan), Pulitzer Prize winner (1980), stroke.
- 25 May – Claus von Bülow, 92, Danish-British socialite.
- 26 May – Stephen Thorne, 84, English actor (Z-Cars, Crossroads, Doctor Who).
- 27 May
  - Sir David Sieff, 80 businessman (Marks & Spencer).
  - Alan Smith, 97, English footballer (Arsenal, Brentford).
- 29 May
  - Adam Patel, Baron Patel of Blackburn, 78, clothier and Member of the House of Lords (since 2000).
  - Michael Spicer, Baron Spicer, 76, politician, MP (1974–2010), chairman of the 1922 Committee (2001–2010) and Member of the House of Lords (since 2010), Parkinson's disease and leukaemia.
- 30 May
  - Anthony Price, 90, author.
  - Andrew Sinclair, 84, polymathic novelist, speechwriter and film director
  - John Tidmarsh, 90, English broadcaster and journalist (Outlook).

=== June ===
- 1 June
  - John Myers, 60, radio executive (GMG Radio, Radio Academy) and presenter, cancer.
  - Alasdair Walker, 62, physician and military officer, brain cancer.
- 2 June
  - Ken Matthews, 84, English race walker, Olympic champion (1964).
  - Alan Rollinson, 76, English racing driver, cancer.
- 3 June
  - Ian Craft, 81, physician.
  - Roy Cruttenden, 94, Olympic long jumper.
  - Paul Darrow, 78, English actor (Blake's 7, Doctor Who).
- 4 June – Robin Herd, 80, English engineer, designer and businessman, co-founder of March Engineering.
- 5 June – Sir David Plastow, 87, businessman.
- 8 June
  - Norman Dewis, 98, racing driver and engineer.
  - Justin Edinburgh, 49, English footballer (Tottenham Hotspur) and manager (Leyton Orient), cardiac arrest.

=== October ===
- 27 October – David May, 70, investigative journalist and editor.

=== November ===
- 29 November – Usman Khan, Islamic terrorist and perpetrator of the 2019 London Bridge stabbing

=== December ===
- 1 December – Paula Tilbrook, 89, English actress

== See also ==
- 2019 in Northern Ireland
- 2019 in Scotland
- 2019 in Wales
