= Bibliography of Theodore Roosevelt =

This bibliography of Theodore Roosevelt is a list of published works about Theodore Roosevelt, the 26th president of the United States. The titles are selected from tens of thousands of publications about him.

== Full biographies ==
- Blake, Michael F. (March 2018), The Cowboy President: The American West and the Making of Theodore Roosevelt, Billings, MT: Two Dot Press, ISBN 978-1493030712
- Brands, Henry William (1997), TR: The Last Romantic (full biography), New York: Basic Books, ISBN 978-0-465-06958-3, OCLC 36954615.
- Chessman, G Wallace (1965), Governor Theodore Roosevelt: The Albany Apprenticeship, 1898–1900
- Cooper, John Milton (1983), The Warrior and the Priest: Woodrow Wilson and Theodore Roosevelt (dual scholarly biography), Harvard University Press, ISBN 978-0-674-94751-1.
- Dalton, Kathleen (2002), Theodore Roosevelt: A Strenuous Life (full scholarly biography), Knopf Doubleday Publishing, ISBN 978-0-679-76733-6.
- Gould, Lewis L (2012), Theodore Roosevelt, 105 pp, very short biography by leading scholar.
- Harbaugh, William Henry (1963), The Life and Times of Theodore Roosevelt (full scholarly biography), Farrar, Straus And Cudahy.
- Leupp, Francis E. (1904), The Man Roosevelt. A Portrait Sketch (concise contemporary biography), D. Appleton & Co.
- Miller, Nathan (1992), Theodore Roosevelt: A Life, William Morrow & Co.
- Morris, Edmund (1979), The Rise of Theodore Roosevelt, vol. 1. To 1901; Pulitzer prize for Volume 1.
- Morris, Edmund (2001), Theodore Rex, vol. 2. To 1909
- Morris, Edmund (2010), Colonel Roosevelt, vol. 3
- Pringle, Henry F (1956) [1932], Theodore Roosevelt (full scholarly biography) (2nd ed.).
- Putnam, Carleton (1958), Theodore Roosevelt (biography), vol. I: The Formative Years, only volume published, to age 28.
- Samuels, Peggy (1997), Teddy Roosevelt at San Juan: The Making of a President, Texas A&M UP, ISBN 9780890967713.
- Thayer, William Roscoe (1919), Theodore Roosevelt: an intimate biography, Houghton Mifflin.

== Personality and activities ==
- Bishop, Joseph Bucklin (2007), Theodore Roosevelt's Letters to His Children, Wildside Press, ISBN 978-1-434-48394-2.
- Canfield, Michael R. (2015). Theodore Roosevelt in the Field. Chicago: University Of Chicago Press. ISBN 978-0-22629-837-5.
- DiSilvestro, Roger (2011), Theodore Roosevelt in the Badlands: A Young Politician's Quest in the American West, Walker & Co, ISBN 978-0-8027-1721-4, archived from the original on March 26, 2011.
- Fehn, Bruce (2005), "Theodore Roosevelt and American Masculinity", Magazine of History, 19 (2): 52–59, doi:10.1093/maghis/19.2.52, ISSN 0882-228X Provides a lesson plan on TR as the historical figure who most exemplifies the quality of masculinity.
- Gardner, Mark Lee (2016), Rough Riders: Theodore Roosevelt, His Cowboy Regiment, and the Immortal Charge Up San Juan Hill, HarperCollins, ISBN 978-0062312082
- Gluck, Sherwin (1999), TR's Summer White House, Oyster Bay. Chronicles the events of TR's presidency during the summers of his two terms.
- Goodwin, Doris Kearns. The Bully Pulpit: Theodore Roosevelt, William Howard Taft, and the Golden Age of Journalism (2013)
- Greenberg, David (2011), "Beyond the Bully Pulpit", Wilson Quarterly, 35 (3): 22–29. The president's use of publicity, rhetoric and force of personality.
- Millard, Candice (2005), The River of Doubt: Theodore Roosevelt's Darkest Journey; his deadly 1913–14 trip to the Amazon.
- McCullough, David (1981), Mornings on Horseback: The Story of an Extraordinary Family, a Vanished Way of Life and the Unique Child Who Became Theodore Roosevelt, Simon & Schuster, ISBN 978-0-7432-1830-6, archived from the original on April 7, 2015, best seller; to 1886.
- ——— (2001) [1981], Mornings on Horseback, The Story of an Extraordinary Family, a Vanished Way of Life, and the Unique Child Who Became Theodore Roosevelt (popular biography), to 1884.
- Mexal, Stephen J. (2021) The Conservative Aesthetic: Theodore Roosevelt, Popular Darwinism, and the American Literary West (Lexington Books) online book review
- O'Toole, Patricia (2005), When Trumpets Call: Theodore Roosevelt after the White House, Simon & Schuster, ISBN 0-684-86477-0. 494 pp.
- Reisner, Christian F. (1922), Roosevelt's Religion, The Abingdon Press
- Renehan, Edward J. (1998), The Lion's Pride: Theodore Roosevelt and His Family in Peace and War, Oxford University Press, examines TR and his family during the World War I period.
- Testi, Arnaldo (1995), "The Gender of Reform Politics: Theodore Roosevelt and the Culture of Masculinity", Journal of American History, 81 (4): 1509–1533, doi:10.2307/2081647, JSTOR 2081647.
- Thompson, J. Lee (2010), Theodore Roosevelt Abroad: Nature, Empire, and the Journey of an American President, Palgrave Macmillan, ISBN 978-0-230-10277-4, 240 pp. TR in Africa & Europe, 1909–10
- Vietze, Andrew (2010), Becoming Teddy Roosevelt: How a Maine Guide Inspired America's 26th President, Down East Books, ISBN 978-0892727841 208 pp. A look at TR's formative years.
- Wagenknecht, Edward. The seven worlds of Theodore Roosevelt (1958) The seven worlds are those of action, thought, human relations, family, spiritual values, public affairs, and war and peace. online
- Watts, Sarah (2003), Rough Rider in the White House: Theodore Roosevelt and the Politics of Desire. 289 pp.
- Wetzel, Benjamin J. Theodore Roosevelt: Preaching from the Bully Pulpit. (Oxford UP, 2021), a spiritual biography
- Yarbrough, Jean M. (2012), Theodore Roosevelt and the American Political Tradition, University Press of Kansas, 337 pp; TR's political thought and its significance for republican self-government.

== Domestic policies ==
- Brinkley, Douglas (2009). The Wilderness Warrior: Theodore Roosevelt and the Crusade for America. New York: HarperCollins. ISBN 9780060565282.online review; another online review
- Cutright, Paul Russell. (1956) Theodore Roosvelt the naturalist (1956) online
- Cutright, Paul Russell. (1985) Theodore Roosevelt: The Making of a Conservationist (U of Illinois Press, 1985) online
- Dorsey, Leroy G. (1997), "The Frontier Myth and Teddy Roosevelt's Fight for Conservation", in Gerster, Patrick; Cords, Nicholas (eds.), Myth America: A Historical Anthology, vol. II, St. James, NY: Brandywine Press, ISBN 1-881089-97-5.
- Gould, Lewis L. (2011), The Presidency of Theodore Roosevelt (2nd ed.), standard history of his domestic and foreign policy as president. online
- Murphey, William (March 2013), "Theodore Roosevelt and the Bureau of Corporation: Executive-Corporate Cooperation and the Advancement of the Regulatory State", American Nineteenth Century History, 14 (1): 73–111, doi:10.1080/14664658.2013.774983, S2CID 146629376.
- Redekop, Benjamin. (2015). "Embodying the Story: The Conservation Leadership of Theodore Roosevelt". Leadership (2015) DOI:10.1177/1742715014546875 online
- Swanson, Ryan A. (2011), "'I Never Was a Champion at Anything': Theodore Roosevelt's Complex and Contradictory Record as America's 'Sports President'", Journal of Sport History, 38 (3): 425–446, doi:10.5406/jsporthistory.38.3.425, S2CID 159307371.
- Tyrrell, Ian, (2015) Crisis of the Wasteful Nation : Empire and Conservation in Theodore Roosevelt's America (U of Chicago Press. 2015). eBook.
- Zacks, Richard (2012), Island of Vice: Theodore Roosevelt's Doomed Quest to Clean Up Sin-Loving New York.

== Politics ==
- Blum, John Morton (1954), The Republican Roosevelt, Cambridge: Harvard University Press, OCLC 310975. How TR did politics.
- Chace, James (2004), 1912: Wilson, Roosevelt, Taft, and Debs: The Election That Changed the Country, Simon and Schuster, ISBN 978-0-7432-0394-4, 323 pp.
- Chambers, John W. (1974), Woodward, C. Vann (ed.), Responses of the Presidents to Charges of Misconduct, New York, New York: Delacorte Press, pp. 207–237, ISBN 0-440-05923-2
- Cowan, Geoffrey. Let the People Rule: Theodore Roosevelt and the Birth of the Presidential Primary (WW Norton, 2016).
- Gable, John A. The Bull Moose Years (Kennikat Press Corp., 1978) 300pp on Roosevelt.
- Gould, Lewis L. (2008), Four Hats in the Ring: The 1912 Election and the Birth of Modern American Politics (by a leading scholar), University Press of Kansas, ISBN 978-0-7006-1564-3.
- Haverkamp, Michael (2001), "Rossevelt and Taft: How the Republican Vote Split in Ohio in 1912", Ohio History, 110 (1): 121–135, archived from the original on March 5, 2008.
- Kohn, Edward P. (Spring 2006), "A Necessary Defeat: Theodore Roosevelt and the New York Mayoral Election of 1886", New York History, 87: 205–227.
- ——— (2006), "Crossing the Rubicon: Theodore Roosevelt, Henry Cabot Lodge, and the 1884 Republican National Convention", Journal of the Gilded Age and Progressive Era, 5 (1): 18–45, doi:10.1017/s1537781400002851, hdl:11693/48372, S2CID 163282993.
- Leuchtenburg, William E. (2015), The American President: From Teddy Roosevelt to Bill Clinton, Oxford University Press
- Milkis, Sidney M. (2009), Theodore Roosevelt, the Progressive Party, and the Transformation of American Democracy, Lawrence: University Press of Kansas. 361 pp.
- Mowry, George E. (1939), "Theodore Roosevelt and the Election of 1910", The Mississippi Valley Historical Review, 25 (4): 523–534, doi:10.2307/1892499, JSTOR 1892499.
- ——— (1946), Theodore Roosevelt and the Progressive Movement. Focus on 1912; online free
- ——— (1954), The Era of Theodore Roosevelt and the Birth of Modern America, 1900–1912 (general survey of era). online free
- Powell, Jim (2006), Bully Boy: The Truth About Theodore Roosevelt's Legacy, Crown Forum, ISBN 0-307-23722-2. Attacks TR policies from conservative/libertarian perspective.
- Ruddy, Daniel (2016), Theodore the Great: Conservative Crusader, Washington, D.C.: Regnery History, ISBN 978-1-62157-441-5

== Foreign policy, military and naval issues ==
- Beale, Howard K. (1956), Theodore Roosevelt and the Rise of America to World Power (standard history of his foreign policy). online
- Burton, D. H. "Theodore Roosevelt and the Special Relationship with Britain" History Today (Aug 1973), Vol. 23 Issue 8, pp 527–535 online.
- Coletta, Paolo E. "The Diplomacy of Theodore Roosevelt and William Howard Taft." In American Foreign Relations: A Historiographical Review, edited by Gerald K. Haines and Samuel J. Walker, 91–114. (Westport, CT: Greenwood Press, 1981).
- Gardner, Mark Lee (2016), Rough Riders: Theodore Roosevelt, His Cowboy Regiment, and the Immortal Charge Up San Juan Hill, HarperCollins, ISBN 978-0062312082
- Hattendorf, John B.; Leeman, William P. (2020), Forging the Trident: Theodore Roosevelt and the United States Navy.
- Hendrix, Henry J. (2009), Theodore Roosevelt's Naval Diplomacy: The US Navy & the Birth of the American Century.
- Hodge, Carl Cavenaugh. (2008) “A Whiff of Cordite: Theodore Roosevelt and the Transoceanic Naval Arms Race, 1897-1909.” Diplomacy and Statecraft 19#4 (2008): 712–31.
- Holmes, James R. (2006), Theodore Roosevelt and World Order: Police Power in International Relations. 328 pp.
- Jones, Gregg (2012), Honor in the Dust: Theodore Roosevelt, War in the Philippines, and the Rise and Fall of America's Imperial Dream, archived from the original on March 8, 2021
- Karsten, Peter. “The Nature of ‘Influence’: Roosevelt, Mahan, and the Concept of Sea Power.” American Quarterly 23#4 (1971): 585–600.
- Kuehn, John T. "Theodore Roosevelt's Naval Diplomacy: The U.S. Navy and the Birth of the American Century," Naval War College Review (2010) 53#3 online
- Livermore, Seward W. "Theodore Roosevelt, the American Navy, and the Venezuelan Crisis of 1902–1903." American Historical Review 51.3 (1946): 452–471. online
- Marks III, Frederick W. (1979), Velvet on Iron: The Diplomacy of Theodore Roosevelt.
- McCullough, David (1977), The Path between the Seas: The Creation of the Panama Canal, 1870–1914.
- Mears, Dwight S. (2018). The Medal of Honor: The Evolution of America's Highest Military Decoration. Lawrence, KS: University Press of Kansas. ISBN 978-0-7006-2665-6. OCLC 1032014828.
- Nester, William R. Theodore Roosevelt and the Art of American Power: An American for All Time (Rowman & Littlefield, 2019). Nester, William R. (September 14, 2023). Theodore Roosevelt and the Art of American Power: An American for All Time. Lexington Books. ISBN 978-1498596756.
- Neu, Charles E. "Theodore Roosevelt and American Involvement in the Far East, 1901–1909." Pacific Historical Review 35.4 (1966): 433–449. online
- O'Gara, Gordon Carpenter. Theodore Roosevelt and the Rise of the Modern Navy. (Princeton UP, 1943). online
- Oyos, Matthew (2011), "Courage, Careers, and Comrades: Theodore Roosevelt and the United States Army Officer Corps", Journal of the Gilded Age and Progressive Era, 10 (1): 23–58, doi:10.1017/s1537781410000022, S2CID 155074242.
- Oyos, Matthew M. In Command: Theodore Roosevelt and the American Military (2018) online review
- Pietrusza, David (2018). TR's Last War: Theodore Roosevelt, the Great War, and a Journey of Triumph and Tragedy
- Ricard, Serge. (2010) “An Atlantic Triangle in the 1900s: Theodore Roosevelt’s ‘Special Relationships’ with France and Britain.” Journal of Transatlantic Studies 8#3 (2010): 202–12.
- Ricard, Serge, ed. A Companion to Theodore Roosevelt (Wiley-Blackwell, 2011), chapters by Lloyd Ambrosius, Douglas Eden, Carl Cavanaugh Hodge, J. Simon Rofe, and William Tilchin
- Ricard, Serge (2006), "The Roosevelt Corollary", Presidential Studies Quarterly, 36 (1): 17–26, doi:10.1111/j.1741-5705.2006.00283.x.
- ——— (2008), "Theodore Roosevelt: Imperialist or Global Strategist in the New Expansionist Age?", Diplomacy and Statecraft, 19 (4): 639–657, doi:10.1080/09592290802564379, S2CID 154317468.
- Rofe, J. Simon (2008), "'Under the Influence of Mahan': Theodore and Franklin Roosevelt and their Understanding of American National Interest", Diplomacy and Statecraft, 19 (4): 732–745, doi:10.1080/09592290802564536, S2CID 154454947.
- ———; Thompson, John M. (2011), "Internationalists in Isolationist times – Theodore and Franklin Roosevelt and a Rooseveltian Maxim", Journal of Transatlantic Studies, 9 (1): 46–62, doi:10.1080/14794012.2011.550773, S2CID 143650928.
- Thompson, John M. Great Power Rising: Theodore Roosevelt and the Politics of US Foreign Policy (Oxford UP, 2019).
- Tilchin, William N. (1997), Theodore Roosevelt and the British Empire: A Study in Presidential Statecraft
- Tilchin, William N; Neu, Charles E, eds. (2006), Artists of Power: Theodore Roosevelt, Woodrow Wilson, and Their Enduring Impact on US Foreign Policy, Praeger. 196 pp.
- Turk, Richard W. The Ambiguous Relationship: Theodore Roosevelt and Alfred Thayer Mahan (1987) online review
- Weisbrode K. "Roosevelt's Man in Europe" Journal of the Gilded Age and Progressive Era (2016) 15#1:45-59. doi:10.1017/S1537781415000602 on Lewis Einstein
- Wimmel, Kenneth. Theodore Roosevelt and the Great White Fleet: American Seapower Comes of Age (Potomac Books, 1998), popular history

== Historiography and memory ==
- Bakari, Mohamed El-Kamel. "Mapping the 'Anthropocentric-ecocentric'Dualism in the History of American Presidency: The Good, the Bad, and the Ambivalent." Journal of Studies in Social Sciences 14, no. 2 (2016).
- Cullinane, M. Patrick, ed. Remembering Theodore Roosevelt: Reminiscences of his Contemporaries (2021) excerpt
- Cullinane, M. Patrick. “The Memory of Theodore Roosevelt through Motion Pictures” in A Companion to Theodore Roosevelt, ed. Serge Ricard (Wiley Blackwell, 2011), 502–520.
- Cullinane, Michael Patrick (2017). Theodore Roosevelt's Ghost: The History and Memory of an American Icon. LSU Press. ISBN 978-0-8071-6672-7.
- Cunliffe, Marcus. "Theodore Roosevelt, President of the United States 1901–1908" History Today (Sept 1955) 4#9 pp. 592–601, online.
- Dalton, Kathleen (2017). "Changing interpretations of Theodore Roosevelt and the Progressive era". In Nichols, Christopher M.; Unger, Nancy C. (eds.). A Companion to the Gilded Age and Progressive Era. pp. 296–307.
- Gable, John. “The Man in the Arena of History: The Historiography of Theodore Roosevelt” in Theodore Roosevelt: Many-Sided American, eds. Natalie Naylor, Douglas Brinkley and John Gable (Interlaken, NY: Hearts of the Lakes, 1992), 613–643.
- Grantham, Dewey W. Jr. (January 1961). "Theodore Roosevelt in American Historical Writing, 1945–1960". Mid-America. 43 (1): 3–35.
- Hull, Katy. "Hero, Champion of Social Justice, Benign Friend: Theodore Roosevelt in American Memory." European journal of American studies 13.13-2 (2018). online
- Ricard, Serge. "The State of Theodore Roosevelt Studies" H-Diplo Essay No. 116 24 October 2014 online
- Ricard, Serge, ed. (2011). A Companion to Theodore Roosevelt. Wiley. ISBN 978-1-4443-3140-0., excerpt and text search, 28 new essays by scholars; focus on historiography.
- Tilchin, William (Summer 1989). "The Rising Star of Theodore Roosevelt's Diplomacy: Major Studies from Beale to the Present". Theodore Roosevelt Association Journal. 15 (3): 2–24.
- West, Mark I. Theodore Roosevelt on Books and Reading (Rowman & Littlefield, 2023) online.
- Wetzel, Benjamin J. "Theodore Roosevelt and the Unionist Memory of the Civil War: Experience, History, and Politics, 1861–1918." Journal of the Gilded Age and Progressive Era 22.2 (2023): 184–203.

== Primary sources ==
- Auchincloss, Louis, ed. Theodore Roosevelt: Letters and Speeches (2004)
- Brands, H. W. The selected letters of Theodore Roosevelt (2001) online
- O'Toole, Patricia ed. In the Words of Theodore Roosevelt : Quotations from the Man in the Arena (Cornell University Press, 2012)
- Hart, Albert Bushnell, and Herbert Ronald Ferleger, Theodore Roosevelt Cyclopedia (1941) online, short excerpts.
- Keller, Morton, ed. (1967), Theodore Roosevelt: A Profile (excerpts from TR and from historians).
- Morison, Elting E. ed. The letters of Theodore Roosevelt (8 vol Harvard UP, 1951–1954); vol 7 online covers 1909-1912
- The Complete Works of Theodore Roosevelt (2017) 4500 pages in Kindle format online for $1 at Amazon
- Kohn, Edward P., ed. A Most Glorious Ride: The Diaries of Theodore Roosevelt, 1877–1886 (State University of New York Press, 2015), 284 pp.
- Bishop, Joseph Bucklin, ed. (1920), Theodore Roosevelt and His Time Shown in His Own Letters vol. 1, archived from the original on December 22, 2020; vol 2
- Roosevelt, Theodore; Roosevelt, Kermit (1926), East of the Sun and West of the Moon, New York: Scribner
- Roosevelt, Theodore (1889), The Winning of the West, vol. I, New York and London: G. P. Putnam's Sons
- ——— (1910), African Game Trails, New York and London: Syndicate Publishers.
- ——— (1913), Autobiography, New York: Macmillan.
- ——— (1916), Fear God and Take Your Own Part, New York: George H. Doran, LCCN 16003624
- ——— (1917), The Foes of Our Own Household, New York: George H. Doran, LCCN 17025965
- ——— (1926), The Works (National ed.), 20 vol.; 18,000 pages containing most of TR's speeches, books and essays, but not his letters.
- ——— (1941), Hart, Albert Bushnell; Ferleger, Herbert Ronald (eds.), Theodore Roosevelt Cyclopedia, Roosevelt's opinions on many issues; online version at Theodore Roosevelt.
- ——— (1951–1954), Morison, Elting E; Blum, John Morton; Chandler, Alfred D jr (eds.), The Letters (annotated ed.), 8 vols. Very large collection. vol 1 1868–1898 online
- ——— (1967), Harbaugh, William (ed.), The Writings (one-volume selection of speeches and essays). online
- ——— (1968), Roosevelt, Archibald (ed.), Theodore Roosevelt on Race, Riots, Reds, Crime, Probe
- ——— (1999) [1913], An Autobiography, Bartleby.
- ——— (1999) [1882], The Naval War of 1812 Or the History of the United States Navy during the Last War with Great Britain to Which Is Appended an Account of the Battle of New Orleans, New York: The Modern Library, ISBN 0-375-75419-9.
- ——— (2001), Brands, HW (ed.), The Selected Letters online
- ——— (2004), Auchincloss, Louis (ed.), Theodore Roosevelt, The Rough Riders and an Autobiography, Library of America, ISBN 978-1-931082-65-5.
- ——— (2004), Auchincloss, Louis (ed.), Letters and Speeches, Library of America, ISBN 978-1-931082-66-2.
- ———. "Books and speeches". Project Gutenberg. Archived from the original on September 24, 2015.
- ———, Original Handwritten and Typed Letters, Notes, and Documents, Shapell Manuscript Foundation.
