= Edison (book) =

2019 biography of Thomas Edison

- Author: Edmund Morris
- Language: English
- Genre: Biography
- Publisher: Random House
- Publication date: 2019
- Pages: 783 pp.
- ISBN: 9780812983210

Edison is a biography of the American inventor Thomas Edison. It was written by Edmund Morris and published posthumously in 2019 after Morris's death that year.

== Background ==
Morris's book The Rise of Theodore Roosevelt won him the Pulitzer Prize for Biography or Autobiography in 1980. Morris has also written Theodore Rex, Colonel Roosevelt and Dutch: A Memoir of Ronald Reagan.

Morris used the archived Edison material at Rutgers University to research for the book. Morris died in May 2019, several months before the book's publication that year in October. Morris finished writing a few months before his death.

== Contents ==
Edison is in reverse chronological order, starting from his death and ending with his birth. It covers Edison's career, including his work on the phonograph, incandescent light bulb and many of his other inventions, his work on producing rubber from plants in the United States, as well his work on telegraphy, electrical engineering, radiography, metallurgy and chemistry. The book also covers patent disputes, lawsuits, Edison's holidays and his relationships.

== Reception ==
The New York Times wrote that the book's reverse chronological order leads the viewer to not properly understand "how one event builds upon another" and to not know if the people mentioned in the beginning of the book are "central to the story". Because Scott Detrow of NPR found the reverse order confusing, he read the book backwards, going from the last chapter to the first. The Washington Post wrote that "Morris [was] eccentric and brilliant enough to make even a life told in reverse a compelling experience."

The New York Times also wrote that "Morris leans heavily toward the 'more is better' school of biography ... leaving it to the reader to assume the author's role of separating the important from the tangential".

The Wall Street Journal wrote that amidst the "elegant" writing are "many lumps of scientific jargon" such as "thermionic emissions" and "electrodeposition techniques".

== See also ==
- Edison, the Man – 1940 biographical film
