= Theodore Rex =

Theodore Rex may refer to:

- Theodore Rex (film), a 1995 buddy cop film starring Whoopi Goldberg
- Theodore Rex (book), a 2001 biography of U.S. President Theodore Roosevelt written by author Edmund Morris
