= Melissa Ede =

English transgender rights campaigner and social media personality

- Born: 25 September 1960; Kingston upon Hull, England
- Died: 11 May 2019 (aged 58); Cottingham, East Riding of Yorkshire, England
- Occupations: Media personality; LGBT rights activist; Taxi driver
- Spouse: Rachel Nason (engaged)
- Children: 4
- Website: www.melissa-ede.co.uk

Melissa Ede (25 September 1960 – 11 May 2019) was an English transgender rights campaigner and social media personality. Ede knew that she was transgender from an early age. Her gender reassignment surgery was completed in 2011 and she subsequently received media attention.

Ede promoted transgender issues by applying for the Mars One project, using it as a platform to profile her life. She gained greater fame following a series of viral videos she uploaded to social media platforms. Ede took part in documentaries about her life made by the BBC and Vice. She also appeared on television shows such as The Jeremy Kyle Show and Tattoo Fixers, which heightened her profile. Ede later won four million pounds on a scratch card which kept up media interest as she carried on campaigning for LGBT rights. On 11 May 2019, she died at her home in Cottingham, East Riding of Yorkshire.

== Early life and career ==
She saw herself as female from a young age. All her friends were female and she found her teenage years to be difficult. Ede worked as a taxi driver in Hull. In Vice's 2015 documentary titled "Taxi to Mars", Ede revealed that she "lived a miserable existence" before transition. In 2005, Ede was refused surgery because a consultant told her she could not successfully live as a woman. She was later accepted into a transition programme and had gender reassignment surgery, which was completed in 2011. Her transition was documented in a number of British magazines. Ede's mother and father refused to speak to her following her transition; they died in 2017. Her sister Cheryl did offer support. While interviewed on Good Morning Britain, Ede claimed her children disowned her following the transition and changed their surnames. Ede continued to work as a taxi driver following her transition and struggled to pay rent. Her transgender status made her vulnerable working in the trade. On one occasion a customer attacked Ede from behind and strangled her, but she managed to pull over next to a police station and was rescued.

In 2014, Ede became a candidate on the Mars One project, run by an organisation which had hoped to take humans to Mars by 2024. Ede spoke of her intentions to use the project as a platform to promote LGBT rights, hoping to become the first transgender person on Mars. She told James Nichols of HuffPost that "my drive to help diversity and people struggling with their lives is another great goal of mine." The project and Ede's participation eventually failed. Ede's participation in Vice's "Taxi to Mars" documentary saw her profile her life as a transgender woman. Ede had a tattoo of the Mars One hashtag on her right forearm. She appeared on E4's reality show Tattoo Fixers to have it removed.

Ede started to create transgender body confidence videos on YouTube. In the videos she dances to music partially naked with mayonnaise bottles and other objects attached to her breasts. Ede continued to make videos, and they eventually attracted attention on Facebook, gaining millions of views and winning her thousands of online followers. The videos earned her the nickname "Mayo Mel" with her online following. The videos also proved to be controversial, and Ede began to receive death threats over the internet. In a bid to raise her profile, she took part in Britain's Got Talent and applied to appear on Big Brother three times.

In 2016, Ede appeared on The Jeremy Kyle Show where a woman accused Ede of trying to steal her husband. In July 2017, Ede appeared on the talk show again, this time alongside her daughter Emily. The episode featured DNA test results revealing that she was not Ede's biological child. Ede won four million pounds on a ten-pound scratch card purchased from a petrol station after she refuelled her car. Speaking at a news conference at the time she said the win was "unbelievable". Ede decided to quit her job as a taxi driver following the win. She later appeared in an episode of ITV's Judge Rinder focusing on a dispute Ede and a friend had concerning a gold ring. Ede later filmed a documentary with the BBC profiling her lottery win.

In October 2018, Ede was banned from Facebook for sharing a post to shame a man with transphobic views. The social media website later reversed their decision and issued her an apology. In April 2019, Ede faced an online backlash after she endorsed a petition calling for McDonald's to use plastic straws instead of biodegradable paper ones. During 2018, Ede began to have a number of cosmetic procedures on her face. Ede had long suffered from complicated dental health and had her teeth removed and replaced with porcelain tooth implants.

== Death ==
On 6 May 2019, Ede was admitted to hospital following severe chest pains. She underwent blood tests, heart checks and lung X-rays, the results of which came back clear, and she was discharged. Ede released a video thanking the NHS and stated that she was thankful to be alive. On 9 May 2019, Ede revealed that internet trolls had begun to wish her dead on social media. On 11 May 2019, Ede died in the front garden of her home in Cottingham, East Riding of Yorkshire, aged 58. Ede's partner Rachel Nason found her slumped behind the wheel of her car and tried to resuscitate her. An ambulance crew were called to the scene and Ede was pronounced dead on their arrival. A post-mortem examination revealed that Ede had died from a heart-attack as a result of ischemic heart disease. Her funeral took place on 30 May 2019.

== Personal life ==
Ede had been married and had four children. In December 2017, Ede became engaged to her girlfriend Rachel Nason.
