= Sylvia Jukes Morris =

British biographer (1935–2020)

Sylvia Jukes Morris (May 24, 1935 – January 5, 2020) was a British-born biographer, based in the United States. She was married to writer Edmund Morris.

== Education and early career ==
External videos
- Presentation by Morris on Edith Kermit Roosevelt: Portrait of a First Lady, November 10, 2001, C-SPAN

Morris was born in Worcestershire, England and educated at Dudley Girl's Grammar School and London University. She taught history and English literature in London before marrying Edmund Morris in 1966 and emigrating to the U.S. two years later. After a period of freelance travel and food writing, she published Edith Kermit Roosevelt: Portrait of a First Lady, the first-book-length biography of Theodore Roosevelt's second wife, in 1980; the book was based on hitherto private family documents. Reviews were positive; Annalyn Swan in Newsweek called it "marvelously full-blooded [and] engagingly written." The Christian Science Monitor said the book represented "craftsmanship of the highest order," and R. W. B. Lewis in The Washington Post Book World, called it "an endlessly engrossing book, at once of historical and human importance." The Modern Library reissued the biography in the fall of 2001.

== Biographer of Clare Boothe Luce ==
External videos
- Booknotes interview with Morris on Rage For Fame: The Ascent of Clare Boothe Luce, July 27, 1997, C-SPAN
- Q&A interview with Morris on Price of Fame: The Honorable Clare Boothe Luce, August 3, 2014, C-SPAN
- Presentation by Morris on Price of Fame, July 22, 2014, C-SPAN

In 1981, Morris became the authorized biographer of Clare Boothe Luce (1903–1987), the playwright, congresswoman and diplomat. In 1997 she published the first volume of Luce's biography, Rage for Fame: The Ascent of Clare Boothe Luce. Gore Vidal described it in The New Yorker as "a model biography . . . of the sort that only real writers can write." Karen Heller commented in The Philadelphia Inquirer, "In this marvelous volume, Sylvia Jukes Morris has not just amassed information, but distilled it. The result is a portrait that is powerful and resonant." Judith Martin disagreed in The New York Times Book Review, criticizing the book's "barrage of anecdotes" and writing, "[T]he stories keep pouring forth without relief." Martin wrote that Morris's approach was "like being on confidential terms with someone who hates her boss." The Times named Rage for Fame a "Notable Book" for 1997.

Seventeen years after the publication of Rage for Fame, Morris published the second volume of the biography, Price of Fame: The Honorable Clare Boothe Luce, in 2014. Reviews were mixed. In The Wall Street Journal, Edward Kosner called Morris's effort "stellar"; Kirkus Reviews characterized it as an "evenhanded and intimate portrait." However, in National Review Florence King called the 752-page volume "an exhausting door-stopper." Noting that Luce had left all of her papers—totaling 460,000 items—to the Library of Congress, King wrote, "I get the distinct feeling that Clare terrorized Morris into using every single thing in the archive." King found Morris's approach "maniacally exacting" and, after enumerating examples that the author had afforded of Luce's clothing, jewelry, perfume, and party guests, wrote, "This is where your reviewer yelled SO WHAT!" "Morris is not great at stepping back and analyzing," wrote Maureen Dowd in The New York Times Book Review. "She just methodically piles up the facts."

== Other work ==
Morris's miscellaneous articles and reviews have appeared in The New York Times Magazine, Travel & Leisure, and The Washington Post. She has served as a judge for the National Book Awards and lectured at the Library of Congress, the National Portrait Gallery and the Newseum of Washington, D.C., as well as the New York Society Library, the Chicago Humanities Festival, the Miami Book Fair, the Palm Beach Junior League and the University of Delaware. Her television credits include appearances on The American Experience, C-SPAN, the History Channel and a transatlantic literary symposium presented by the Paris Review and the English-Speaking Union.
