= Cecil Boswell =

English cricketer

Personal information
- Full name: Cecil Stanley Reginald Boswell
- Born: 19 January 1910; Edmonton, Middlesex, England
- Died: 15 August 1985 (aged 75); Brundall, Norfolk, England
- Batting: Right-handed
- Bowling: Right-arm leg break
- Role: Bowler

Domestic team information
- Years: Team
- 1932–1936: Essex
- 1939–1955: Norfolk

Career statistics
Competition	First-class
Matches	30
Runs scored	406
Batting average	10.68
100s/50s	0/1
Top score	69
Balls bowled	2,597
Wickets	36
Bowling average	37.36
5 wickets in innings	0
10 wickets in match	0
Best bowling	4/22
Catches/stumpings	12/–
- Source: Cricinfo, 8 August 2020

Cecil Stanley Reginald Boswell (19 January 1910 – 15 August 1985) was an English cricketer. He played for Essex County Cricket Club between 1932 and 1936 before going on to play as a professional for Norfolk County Cricket Club until 1955.

== Biography ==
Boswell was born at Edmonton in Middlesex in 1910. He played as a leg spin and googly bowler for Essex, making 30 first-class appearances between 1932 and 1936. He "showed some promise" but ultimately "failed to fulfil expectations" and took only 36 wickets for the county. He left Essex at the end of the 1937 season and by 1939 had qualified to play for Norfolk, making his Minor Counties Championship debut, taking 38 wickets and playing against the touring West Indians at Lakenham.

Boswell served during World War II in the British Army, playing some cricket during the war for Army teams, and returned to Norfolk to play in the 1946 Minor Counties Championship, taking five wickets in the first match of the season against Hertfordshire. The following season he took nine wickets against the same team and finished the season with 52 wickets in Norfolk's ten matches. He quickly established himself as Norfolk's key bowler in an otherwise weak bowling attack as Norfolk were constantly towards the bottom of the Championship table during the following five seasons. He took 15 wickets in a match again Buckinghamshire in 1949 and returned figures of five wickets for eight runs (5/8) against Suffolk in 1952.

As Norfolk's professional, Boswell took responsibility for coaching young players, including John Edrich, who made his Norfolk debut in 1954 as a 17-year old and went on to be named one of the Wisden Cricketers of the Year in 1966. Boswell played until the end of the 1955 season, making a total of 103 Minor Counties Championship matches for Norfolk. He took 329 wickets at a bowling average of 22.02 runs per wicket and scored 1,921 runs. He was replaced as professional by Ted Witherden, although he continued to act as a coach and administrator and worked from 1954 to 1975 at Norwich School as cricket coach and groundsman.

Boswell died in a nursing home at Brundall near Norwich in 1985. He was aged 75. His son, Barry, played 12 matches for Norfolk in the Minor Counties Championship between 1967 and 1974.
