= List of Tattoo Fixers episodes =

Tattoo Fixers is a British reality television series to cover up members of the public's worst tattoos. As of 7 April 2022, 81 episodes have been broadcast, airing six series. As of 2019 two Christmas Specials and a Valentine's Special have been broadcast, but these were not stylised under the usual title of (Series ?, Episode ?) but rather as a special.

== Series overview ==
Series	Episodes	Originally released		Series average (millions)
Series	Episodes	First released	Last released	Series average (millions)
1	9	23 June 2015	18 August 2015	0.61
2	15	22 December 2015	29 March 2016	0.99
3	16 (+2 Specials)	7 December 2016	28 March 2017	TBA
4	17 (+1 Special)	7 November 2017	27 March 2018	TBA
5	15	17 September 2018	5 February 2019	TBA
6	9	27 March 2019	22 May 2019	TBA

== Episodes ==
=== Series 1 (2015) ===
The first series of Tattoo Fixers aired on 23 June 2015 at 10:00pm on E4 The series ran through every Tuesday, for nine weeks, until the final episode on 18 August 2015.

No. overall	No. in series	Title	Original release date	UK viewers (millions)
1	1	"Series 1, Episode 1"	23 June 2015	0.55
The team tackle Sam's embarrassing tattoo, which has earned him a serious ultimatum, deal with holiday ink that Ryan doesn't remember getting, and rid Adam of a lasting reminder of his ex.
2	2	"Series 1, Episode 2"	30 June 2015	0.68
Coronation Street superfan Martyn is hoping to pay tribute to a soap legend. Ryan's declaration of love has left him needing a cover up, and the guys tackle some cringe-worthy holiday ink nightmares. Note: Two years after airing, Martyn Hett would be one of the 22 fatalities in the Manchester Arena bombing. His Deirdre Barlow tattoo featured in the episode was instrumental in identifying his body.
3	3	"Series 1, Episode 3"	7 July 2015	0.64
Glamour model Bex wants to put her Jedward tattoo behind her, and Andy has an inspirational tattoo story. Annie hopes to fix a tattoo that, after a mid-inking disagreement, didn't turn out as planned.
4	4	"Series 1, Episode 4"	14 July 2015	0.61
Michael needs help with a holiday tattoo that's writing cheques his anatomy can't cash. Superfan Emma wants to commit to ink her love for Cheryl Fernandez-Versini. A fire-eater lights up Jay's eyes.
5	5	"Series 1, Episode 5"	21 July 2015	0.59
Lou helps tomboy Lucy, who has a vulgar phrase tattooed on her leg. Skater boy Matt shows Sketch a tattoo in an unsightly place. Jay assists Amina, who thinks getting inked is worse than giving birth.
6	6	"Series 1, Episode 6"	28 July 2015	0.76
Sketch meets Gaz, who has his best friend's initials in an intimate place, and the whole team are shocked by the cover-up he wants. Jay gives Lady Gaga superfan Harry the portrait of his dreams.
7	7	"Series 1, Episode 7"	4 August 2015	0.66
Jay deals with a couple who are obsessed with going on holiday and getting cheap tattoos. Lou is busy sorting out Thom, who has arrived with a rude tribute to one of his friends on his rear end.
8	8	"Series 1, Episode 8"	11 August 2015	0.75
Victoria is in desperate need of a tattoo cover-up so she can train as a teacher. Abigail gets inked at the age of 75, Hollie loses her cheeky chicken ink, and Lisa divorces a big tattoo mistake.
9	9	"Series 1, Episode 9"	18 August 2015	0.86
Lou helps Will to cover a famous face in an intimate place. Jay assists model Gigi, who has the initials of not one, but two exes on her breast. Chris has a tattoo dedicated to his best friend's mum.

=== Series 2 (2015–16) ===
On 18 August 2015, the show's official Twitter account tweeted "BOOM! That's #TattooFixers over for the series but we will be back very soon."; confirming the commission of a second series. In addition, cast member Jay announced on his Facebook account that the show would be returning. On 19 August 2015, Daily Post rumoured that filming for the second series would commence in October 2015. The second series started airing on 22 December 2015, airing fifteen episodes. The first eleven episodes were aired on Tuesday nights, whilst the remaining four episodes were broadcast on Monday nights.

No. overall	No. in series	Title	Original release date	UK viewers (millions)
10	1	"Series 2, Episode 1"	22 December 2015	0.88
Vicky celebrates her family with an animal tribute tattoo, Abby's cringe-worthy celebrity crush is covered, Jordan needs to lose the ink he got to win an argument, and Adam has a rather personal tattoo.
11	2	"Series 2, Episode 2"	29 December 2015	0.83
Respectable dad Stephen aims to see the back of a crude tattoo he had 20 years ago. Tattoo-mad ex-soldier Rob's phallic self-portrait is a step too far, and Leeanneah has lyrics tattooed on her chest.
12	3	"Series 2, Episode 3"	5 January 2016	0.91
House fire survivor Steve has his scarring covered with a Celtic knot design, Amy swaps an embarrassing marriage proposal for a tribute to her favourite dinosaur, and Sam's X-rated nickname is hidden.
13	4	"Series 2, Episode 4"	12 January 2016	0.92
The team help Georgie, who had such a wild time with the boys on holiday she commemorated the trip with a tattoo that's left her single ever since. Alice takes on Kelly's animation-inspired disaster.
14	5	"Series 2, Episode 5"	19 January 2016	1.10
Sketch covers a shoddy Egyptian-themed tattoo for Ste, Dave is dragged to the studio by his children, who can't bear his obscene back-piece any longer, and Kara needs to lose an inappropriate emoji.
15	6	"Series 2, Episode 6"	26 January 2016	1.07
Jay covers paramedic Anthony's tattoo, which is putting the frighteners on his patients. Alice disguises Sonny's unwanted present from his mates. Sketch tackles Alex's drunken DIY teddy bear design.
16	7	"Series 2, Episode 7"	2 February 2016	0.98
Drag queen Devon feels snared by his barbed-wire tattoo because it's a painful reminder of an ex. Alice welcomes Halloween-loving Chippy, whose portrait of her daughter is more than a little spooky.
17	8	"Series 2, Episode 8"	9 February 2016	1.13
Eccentric dancer Marina wants a confidence-boosting tattoo cover to get her back onto the podium. The artists see double when identical twins Hayley and Rebecca come in with matching bad body art.
18	9	"Series 2, Episode 9"	16 February 2016	1.17
Ladies' man Ash needs help covering an embarrassing portrait of his beloved mum. Sean wants a cover for his leg tattoo of two dogs doing what comes naturally. Dancer Jay-Jay loses her X-rated tatt.
19	10	"Series 2, Episode 10"	23 February 2016	1.05
Scott's terrible tattoo takes his love for Norwich City FC too far. Jay has space-loving Dan's back with an out-of-this-world cover. Sketch tackles a cover to help transgender Jai feel more feminine.
20	11	"Series 2, Episode 11"	2 March 2016	1.03
Alice gets her claws into dog-lover William's cover when he betrays his furry friends in ink. Emma disguises her tattooed equations after attempts to impress her maths teacher didn't add up.
21	12	"Series 2, Episode 12"	8 March 2016	1.04
Sketch helps Sian cover a clown tattoo that's scaring the life out of anyone who sees it. Jay has to deal with Emma's extremely intimate cat portrait. Daz needs assistance covering a boastful tattoo.
22	13	"Series 2, Episode 13"	15 March 2016	0.95
Harry wants a memorial tattoo dedicated to a very intimate part of himself after surviving testicular cancer. Matt has doodled on his own legs with a tattoo machine his parents got him for Christmas.
23	14	"Series 2, Episode 14"	22 March 2016	1.01
The artists cover Zoe's tattoo dedicated to her favourite food, Sean's lewd and lengthy leprechaun that his wife wants rid of, and Chantal's pitiful pop portrait that looks like a famous footballer.
24	15	"Series 2, Episode 15"	29 March 2016	0.85
Hayley's cheeky cartoon tattoo is threatening to derail her wedding plans. Mick wants to cover an X-rated inking that's causing embarrassment to his daughter. Dom's saucy camel is giving him the hump.

=== Series 3 (2016–17) ===
A new series of Tattoo Fixers started on 7 December 2016.

No. overall	No. in series	Title	Original release date	UK viewers (millions)
25	1	"Series 3, Episode 1"	7 December 2016	N/A
Jay saves Luke's bacon with a highly polished portrait. Alice gives Kayleigh a peacock to be proud of and deletes Hannah's horrible hashtag, while Sketch beautifies Mark's belly Buddha.
26	2	"Series 3, Episode 2"	13 December 2016	N/A
Gangster film fan Bradley needs Sketch's help to mend his criminal Robert De Niro portrait. Alice helps Beverley sort out a cheeky backside blunder and Jay wipes Bailey's holiday Poomoji tatt clean.
27	—	"Tattoo Fixers at Christmas"	20 December 2016	N/A
Sketch bakes up a gingerbread-based treat for Luke, Alice uses Sam's bum to help reunite a yuletide favourite with his family, and Jay gives Brendan's below-the-belt mistletoe the kiss-off it deserves.
28	3	"Series 3, Episode 3"	27 December 2016	N/A
Hopeless romantic Karl needs Sketch's assistance to remove a tribute to his ex. Jay helps Darren, who's found god and wants a dirty devil tattoo covered. Alice tackles Alex's Game of Thrones inking.
29	4	"Series 3, Episode 4"	3 January 2017	N/A
Sketch assists John, an extra-terrestrial enthusiast whose tattoo is on another planet. Jay works on Alec, who made a big mistake with a tiny inking, and Alice helps Jenny with her eye-popping tattoo.
30	5	"Series 3, Episode 5"	10 January 2017	N/A
Sketch meets Amber, whose love of soaps has gone a step too far. Alice helps cancer survivor Linsey cover a scar that is a painful memory. Jay gives Ian a portrait that has to be seen to be believed.
31	6	"Series 3, Episode 6"	17 January 2017	N/A
Belieber Nathan decides it's time for Sketch to rid him of his embarrassing fan tattoo, and Jay tackles a 'bad' tattoo of his idol.
32	7	"Series 3, Episode 7"	24 January 2017	N/A
Sketch meets Billy, whose habit of tattooing himself to impress the ladies has got out of hand, and a transgender man wanting to replace a feminine tattoo.
33	8	"Series 3, Episode 8"	31 January 2017	N/A
Model Kelly needs Sketch's help to remove a lower-back tattoo. Alice tackles Liam's DIY tattoo disaster. Jay creates a memorial tattoo for Mitch, who lost his father and brother in a tragic accident.
34	9	"Series 3, Episode 9"	7 February 2017	N/A
Alice paints over Francesca's pitiful Picasso, Sketch gives Madison a sci-fi inspired memorial to her mum and assists Owen with his Welsh beef, while Jay helps Ryan deflate his filthy Bangkok balloon.
35	—	"Valentine's Special"	13 December 2016	N/A
Jay gives Deal or No Deal fan Angie a homage to her one true love. Sketch gets Cupid's arrow back on track for cartoon-loving Damian. Alice helps spiritual teen Miguel shake off his immature inking.
36	10	"Series 3, Episode 10"	21 February 2017	N/A
Alice helps rid former club rep Sammie of an unladylike error, Lloyd asks Sketch to erase his misunderstood etching, and Jay sorts out martial arts fan Jimmy's naughty nod to Chuck Norris.
37	11	"Series 3, Episode 11"	28 February 2017	N/A
Jay covers Jack's offensive nickname tatt and gives Harry John a moving memorial to his sister, while Sketch sweeps away Mark's cobwebs and dismisses Deborah's dodgy portrait.
38	12	"Series 3, Episode 12"	7 March 2017	N/A
Tony is bored with being the butt of the joke, Nathan's drunken tattoo has left him with egg on his face - and knee - while Sketch gives Jenny a permanent reminder of her best pri-mate.
39	13	"Series 3, Episode 13"	14 March 2017	N/A
Emma needs Jay's help with a warning sign to potential lovers. Sketch rescues Michael after his Taylor Swift tatt got him in trouble. Alice assists former wild child Louise with her eye-popping ink.
40	14	"Series 3, Episode 14"	21 March 2017	N/A
James needs some landscaping over his stickman. Joanne requires an inking to stop her getting spanked. Nicole wants her laddish tatt given a girly makeover. George seeks help before he gets detention.
41	15	"Series 3, Episode 15"	28 March 2017	N/A
Nathan wants to banish his bad luck back tatt. Gina's randy chicken clucks off for good. Ollie's wheezy Magaluf inking is sent into orbit. Alice gives Taylia a matching tattoo in honour of her sister.
42	16	"Top Tatts"	2017	TBD
In this compilation, Jay covers the tattoo that got Dylan kicked out of home and Alice gives Kayleigh an original design to be proud of. Sketch makes John's UFO go and upgrades Mark's Buddha belly.

=== Series 4 (2017–18) ===
No. overall	No. in series	Title	Original release date	UK viewers (millions)
43	1	"Tattoo Fixers at Halloween"	7 November 2017	N/A
It's Halloween in the pop-up parlour. Sketch slays Fiona's zombie and helps Spike with a monster of a tattoo. Glen gives magician George a frightening new friend. Tom needs to break his unlucky curse.
44	2	"Series 4, Episode 2"	14 November 2017	N/A
Jay banishes Ant's backside buddy. Glen checks out Erika's checklist. Alice blows away Cheryl's windy devil and helps Chelsea get over the shock of her life. Sketch tackles Jason's sambuca stunt scar.
45	3	"Series 4, Episode 3"	21 November 2017	N/A
Alice flushes away Lucy's toilet tatt and helps Chloe to love her legs. Jay takes on Tom's superhero design, Sketch covers Chris's boastful nickname, and Glen removes Darren's chat-up line leg art.
46	4	Series 4, Episode 4	28 November 2017	N/A
Lisa pays tribute to her idol Robbie Williams, cockney geezer Jack covers his literal leg tattoo, Alice cleans up Lana's dirty mouth, while Sketch runs rings around Sergiu's romantic gesture.
47	5	Series 4, Episode 5	5 December 2017	N/A
Sketch conceals a large portrait on biker Les, Alice spreads Becca's favourite food on her leg, and Jay immortalises Ashley's best mate Georgia as a pin-up girl over a string of lame letters.
48	6	Series 4, Episode 6	12 December 2017	N/A
Alice creates a pawsome inking for feline fan Luke, Sketch rids Gavin of his saucy slogan, Glen tackles Hannah's four-letter faux pas, and Jay creates a smoking hot design for firefighter Simon.
49	—	Tattoo Fixers at Christmas	19 December 2017	N/A
50	7	Series 4, Episode 7	26 December 2017	N/A
Sketch tackles Nick's measuring stick and covers Fran's naughty nickname. Alice gets rid of Jade's crab, Glen helps heathen Bob get an honour inking, and Jay removes Lee's charming chat-up line.
48	8	Series 4, Episode 8	2 January 2018	N/A
49	9	Series 4, Episode 9	9 January 2018	N/A
50	10	Series 4, Episode 10	16 January 2018	N/A
51	11	Series 4, Episode 11	23 January 2018	N/A
52	12	Series 4, Episode 12	30 January 2018	N/A
53	13	Series 4, Episode 13: Tattoo Fixers Valentine’s Special	13 February 2018	N/A
54	14	Series 4, Episode 14	6 March 2018	N/A
55	15	Series 4, Episode 15	13 March 2018	N/A
56	16	Series 4, Episode 16: Tattoo Fixers: X-Rated	20 March 2018	N/A
57	17	Series 4, Episode 17: Tattoo Fixers: Most Shocking	27 March 2018	N/A

=== Series 5 (2018–19) ===
No. overall	No. in series	Title	Original release date	UK viewers (millions)
58	1	Series 5, Episode 1: Tattoo Fixers: Extreme	17 September 2018	N/A
59	2	Series 5, Episode 2: Tattoo Fixers: Extreme	24 September 2018	N/A
60	3	Series 5, Episode 3: Tattoo Fixers: Extreme	1 October 2018	N/A
Note: Episode guest starred Dr. Stuart Murray, stepfather of Martyn Hett; a prior guest star in Series 1, Episode 2 who was killed in the Manchester Arena bombing. Murray received a recreation of his stepson's Deirdre Barlow tattoo as tribute to him.
61	4	Series 5, Episode 4: Tattoo Fixers: Extreme	6 November 2018	N/A
62	5	Series 5, Episode 5: Tattoo Fixers: Extreme	13 November 2018	N/A
63	6	Series 5, Episode 6: Tattoo Fixers: Extreme	20 November 2018	N/A
64	7	Series 5, Episode 7: Tattoo Fixers: Extreme	27 November 2018	N/A
65	8	Series 5, Episode 8: Tattoo Fixers: Extreme	4 December 2018	N/A
66	9	Series 5, Episode 9: Tattoo Fixers: Extreme	11 December 2018	N/A
67	10	Series 5, Episode 10: Tattoo Fixers: Extreme	18 December 2018	N/A
68	11	Series 5, Episode 11: Tattoo Fixers: Extreme	8 January 2019	N/A
69	12	Series 5, Episode 12: Tattoo Fixers:Extreme	15 January 2019	N/A
70	13	Series 5, Episode 13: Tattoo Fixers: Extreme	22 January 2019	N/A
71	14	Series 5, Episode 14: Tattoo Fixers: Extreme	29 January 2019	N/A
72	15	Series 5, Episode 15: Tattoo Fixers: Extreme	5 February 2019	N/A

=== Series 6 (2019) ===
No. overall	No. in series	Title	Original release date	UK viewers (millions)
73	1	Series 6, Episode 1: Tattoo Fixers: Extreme	27 March 2019	N/A
Grenfell Tower survivors Marcio and Andreia are given a tattoo to remember their baby son
74	2	Series 6, Episode 2: Tattoo Fixers: Extreme	3 April 2019	N/A
Sketch impeaches Lewys's presidential portrait. Pash covers Rihanna's regretful reminder.
75	3	Series 6, Episode 3: Tattoo Fixers: Extreme	10 April 2019	N/A
Uzzi covers up Daniel's top-shelf blunder. Alice erases Jemma's diabolical dating days.
76	4	Series 6, Episode 4: Tattoo Fixers: Extreme	17 April 2019	N/A
Pash covers biker Pete's offensive ink, while Sketch helps Sam with a backdoor blunder
77	5	Series 6, Episode 5: Tattoo Fixers: Extreme	24 April 2019	N/A
Alice covers Jade's faulty ode to friendship. Uzzi loses country boy Foston's rural rhyme.
78	6	Series 6, Episode 6: Tattoo Fixers: Extreme	1 May 2019	N/A
Sketch deals with a pig of a tattoo belonging to Louis. Pash drops Steve's saucy anchor.
79	7	Series 6, Episode 7: Tattoo Fixers: Extreme	8 May 2019	N/A
Uzzi gives Josh a helping hand. Alice creates a design for toe wrestling champion Alan.
80	8	Series 6, Episode 8: Tattoo Fixers: Extreme	15 May 2019	N/A
Sketch deletes a disastrous dare for Steve. Pash cleans up Justin's X-rated etching.
81	9	Series 6, Episode 9: Tattoo Fixers: Extreme	22 May 2019	N/A
Alice takes pity on Teresa and her kitty, while Uzzi covers Sean's crustacean situation
