= Tattoo Fixers =

British reality television series

- Genre: Reality television
- Starring: Jay Hutton; Lou Hopper; Sketch Porter; Paisley Billings; Alice Perrin; Glen Carlos; Pash Canby; Uzzi Canby
- Opening theme: Chris Lewis
- Country of origin: United Kingdom
- No. of seasons: 6
- No. of episodes: 85 (+3 Specials) (list of episodes)

Production
- Executive producer: Tim Harcourt
- Producer: Matthew J. Smith
- Editors: Dom Bird; Simone Haywood
- Running time: 60 minutes
- Production company: Studio Lambert

Original release
- Network: E4
- Release: 23 June 2015 – 22 May 2019

Related
- Tattoo Nightmares; Body Fixers

Tattoo Fixers is a British reality television series based in Hackney in London, broadcast on E4, from 23 June 2015 to 22 May 2019. The series follows some talented tattoo artists helping members of the public cover up some of the rudest and crudest tattoos by transforming them from extreme inking disasters into walking works of art.

== Cast ==
Name	Series				
Name	1	2	3	4	5
Cast members
Jay Hutton					
Sketch Porter					
Lou Hopper					
Paisley Billings					
Alice Perrin					
Glen Carloss					
Pash Canby					
Uzzi Canby					

== Episodes ==
Series	Episodes	Originally released		Series average (millions)
Series	Episodes	First released	Last released	Series average (millions)
1	9	23 June 2015	18 August 2015	0.61
2	15	22 December 2015	29 March 2016	0.99
3	16 (+2 Specials)	7 December 2016	28 March 2017	TBA
4	17 (+1 Special)	7 November 2017	27 March 2018	TBA
5	15	17 September 2018	5 February 2019	TBA
6	9	27 March 2019	22 May 2019	TBA

== Production ==
On 12 February 2015, Digital Spy announced that television channel, E4, would be commissioning a nine-part documentary series; The Tattoo Fixers. However, it was later shortened to Tattoo Fixers. The series follows the same format as the American show Tattoo Nightmares.

The original cast of Tattoo Fixers included Jay Hutton, Sketch Porter, Lou Hopper and Paisley Billings.

For the second series, Hopper was replaced by Alice Perrin. All other cast members from series one returned.

In 2016 it was revealed that all cast members from the second series would return for the third series. These include Jay Hutton, Sketch Porter, Alice Perrin and Paisley Billings.

On 12 July 2017, the show announced that a new tattoo fixer would be joining the cast for the fourth series, Glen Carloss. All other cast members from series 3 returned. This also marked the first series to have four tattooists present.

In 2018 it was confirmed that Hutton would not be returning for the fifth series. It was later confirmed that the fourth series tattooist Glen Carloss would not return for another series. It was later revealed that Hutton and Carloss' replacements would be Pash and Uzzi Canby, two brothers from Devon.

Tattoo Fixers was not renewed for a sixth season and although not confirmed no further series have aired since February 2019.

== International broadcasts ==
In Australia, the series premiered on GO! on 2 September 2015.

== Spin-offs ==
In 2016, Channel 4 announced the commission of two Tattoo Fixers spin-offs. Tattoo Fixers on Holiday will be similar to the parent series but with a focus on tattoos picked up on holidays abroad, whilst Body Fixers will look at non-tattoo cosmetic alterations such as body piercing, hair dye and botox. Casting calls for Body Fixers began to appear after episodes of Tattoo Fixers from February 2016 and the series began on 13 September 2016.

Airing from April 2017, Tattoo Artist of the Year will be judged by Jay Hutton and Rose Hardy.

== Reception ==
=== Critical reception ===
Professional tattoo artists have been heavily critical of Tattoo Fixers, accusing the show of misrepresenting the industry.

=== Awards and nominations ===
Award	Year	Result	Ref
National Television Award for "Factual Entertainment"	2017	Nominated	
