= Michael William Feast =

British-South African astronomer (1926–2019)

- Born: 29 December 1926; Deal, Kent, England
- Died: 1 April 2019 (aged 92); Cape Town, South Africa
- Scientific career
- Fields: Astronomy
- Workplaces: University of Cape Town; South African Astronomical Observatory

Michael William Feast (29 December 1926 – 1 April 2019) was a British-South African astronomer. He served as Director of the South African Astronomical Observatory from 1976–1992, then became a professor at the University of Cape Town.

His research focussed on the structure of the Milky Way, the Magellanic Clouds, and the cosmic distance ladder using variable stars.

== Career and honours ==
Feast holds the degrees of BSc (Hons) and PhD from London From 1949 to 1951 he worked with Gerhard Herzberg at the National Research Council in Ottawa, Ontario, Canada, following which from 1952 to 1974 he was at the Radcliffe Observatory, Pretoria He was also director of the South African Astronomical Observatory from 1976 to 1992.

He received the DeBeers Medal from the South African Institute of Physics in 1992 and the Gill Medal from the Astronomical Society of Southern Africa in 1983. Feast was an Honorary Fellow of the Royal Astronomical Society, Fellow of the Royal Society of South Africa. The University of Cape Town awarded him an honorary Doctor of Science degree in 1993. Feast was an editor of the journal Monthly Notices of the Royal Astronomical Society.

His most frequently cited paper (440 times) relates to his pioneering study of the brightest stars in the Magellanic Clouds with Thackeray and Wesselink; see, for example, Hodge (1999).

Much of his work has related to the Cepheid period–luminosity relation, for example that on its zero-point as determined via the Hipparcos satellite

He died in his sleep on 1 April 2019, aged 92.
