= Ted Witherden =

English cricketer (1922–2019)

Personal information
- Full name: Edwin George Witherden
- Born: 1 May 1922; Goudhurst, Kent, England
- Died: 6 May 2019 (aged 97); Stoke Mandeville, Buckinghamshire, England
- Batting: Right-handed
- Bowling: Right-arm off-spin

Domestic team information
- Years: Team
- 1951–1955: Kent
- 1956–1962: Norfolk
- FC debut: 6 June 1951 Kent v Minor Counties
- Last FC: 11 June 1955 Kent v Somerset

Career statistics
Competition	First-class
Matches	40
Runs scored	1,380
Batting average	22.25
100s/50s	2/5
Top score	125*
Balls bowled	822
Wickets	9
Bowling average	41.22
5 wickets in innings	1
10 wickets in match	0
Best bowling	5/32
Catches/stumpings	13/–
- Source: Cricinfo, 8 August 2020

Edwin George Witherden (1 May 1922 – 6 May 2019), known as Ted Witherden, was an English cricketer who played first-class cricket for Kent County Cricket Club from 1951 to 1955. He later went on to be one of the most successful batsmen to play in the Minor Counties Championship, playing for Norfolk County Cricket Club between 1956 and 1962. In later life he was a successful groundsman and cricket coach in Bishop's Stortford.

== Early life and war service ==
Witherden was born at Goudhurst in Kent, the son of a policeman. He played for Sandwich Town Cricket Club before the war and had an unsuccessful trial with Kent in 1938 at the age of 16.

During World War II Witherden served with the Royal East Kent Regiment (the Buffs), enlisting in 1940 and serving on the home front until 1943. He transferred to the 3rd battalion, Northern Rhodesia Regiment in Kenya and was promoted to the rank of Sergeant, serving in Madagascar and Abyssinia. The regiment was sent to India in 1944 and Witherden saw active service as part of the 22nd (East Africa) Infantry Brigade in the Arakan area during the Burma campaign. He ended the war with the rank of Company Sergeant Major.

== Cricket ==
A second trial with Kent in 1947 saw Witherden judged to be a "fair" player but one who, at the age of 26, was considered to be "too old". He was playing for Leigh Cricket Club in Kent and working on the ground staff at Tonbridge School when he played his first matches for Kent Second XI in 1950. In three matches he took 19 wickets with his off-spin at a bowling average of 13.52 and, despite his age, was taken on to the Kent staff for the 1951 season.

He played as a professional for Kent from 1951 to 1955, but never established a firm place in the team. Good bowling performances for the Kent Club and Ground and Second XI teams saw Witherden make his first-class debut in 1951 against a Minor Counties XI, taking five wickets on debut for a cost of 32 runs (5/32) in the second innings. He played once more for the First XI during the season, but impressed for the Second XI, recording a batting average of 76.83 during the season. A single First XI appearance in 1952 followed, although he scored 844 runs and took 66 wickets for the Second XI, and ahead of the 1953 season it was announced that he would be acting as an assistant coach as well as being retained as a professional.

Three centuries for the Second XI saw Witherden called into the Kent team in July 1953. He enjoyed a purple patch, scoring both of his first-class centuries in a fortnight. At Blackheath he scored 26 not out in a Kent first innings total of 63 against Surrey, who were beginning to dominate county cricket, and then made 125 not out in five hours in the second innings, his first first-class century, almost single-handedly preventing defeat. In the following match, Witherden made 8 and 51 against Warwickshire at Maidstone, and the following day scored 100, his only other first-class century, in three hours in an innings victory over Worcestershire on the same ground.

The remainder of the 1953 season saw only two more double-figure scores for Witherden as he played in nine Kent matches. Two half-centuries at the start of the 1954 season showed more promise, but in 22 appearances for Kent he only made one other score of 50, scoring 72 against Essex at Blackheath. The following season he made only six appearances for the First XI, although he again scored well for the Second XI. In total he made 40 first-class appearances for Kent, scoring 1,380 runs and taking nine wickets.

After 1955 he left Kent and joined the minor county Norfolk, where he played as their professional for seven seasons, replacing Cecil Boswell. He was highly successful in his first five seasons, and was the leading run-scorer in the Minor Counties Championship in 1958, scoring 808 runs at a batting average of 44.88, in 1959 (1,031 runs at 79.30 with three centuries) and in 1960 (855 runs at 53.43). He was also one of the leading Minor Counties bowlers in 1956. His 1959 performance was the first time a Norfolk batsman had scored 1,000 runs in the Minor Counties Championship and remains one of only 13 times the feat has been achieved and is the eighth highest season's aggregate in the competition's history.

In his seven seasons with Norfolk, Witherden played 76 Minor County matches, scoring 4,794 runs at an average of 45.65, with 13 centuries, and taking 104 wickets at 21.15. He was awarded a benefit season in 1961, but suffered an injury to his right hand. This required an operation in 1962, meaning that he missed half of Norfolk's matches.

== Family and later life ==
Witherden was released by Norfolk with a year to run on his contract in order to take up the post of head groundsman at Bishop's Stortford College in 1963. He remained in the post until he retired in 1986 with his son, Nigel, following him to become a groundsman at the college. Witherden also coached the college cricket team and continued to play cricket for Bishop's Stortford Cricket Club. Nigel played briefly for Norfolk and two of Witherden's granddaughters have played Twenty20 cricket for the Hertfordshire Women cricket team.

Ted Witherden died at Stoke Mandeville in May 2019 at the age of 97. The main cricket field at Bishop's Stortford College was renamed the Witherden Field in December 2019, in honour of both Ted and Nigel.
