= Natalie Naylor =

American historian (born 1937/38)

- Born: Peekskill, New York
- Occupation: Professor Emeritus of History

Academic background
- Education: Bryn Mawr College (BA); Teachers College, Columbia University (MA) (EdD)

Academic work
- Discipline: history
- Sub-discipline: history of Long Island
- Institutions: Hofstra University

Natalie A. Naylor (born: 1937/8) is an American historian of Long Island and gender. She is professor emeritus at Hofstra University, had been the first director of the Long Island Studies Institute from 1985 to 2000, and president of the Nassau County Historical Society from 2008 to 2020.

== Early life ==
Naylor was born in Peekskill, New York in 1937/1938 to Colin T. Naylor Jr. She earned a bachelor of arts at Bryn Mawr College, and a master's and doctorate in education from Columbia University's Teachers College.

== Career ==
Naylor began working at Hofstra University in 1968, moving to the university's New College (Note: The "New College" is based upon a system at the University of Oxford to teach non-traditional courses. Hofstra University's New College ran throughout the 1960s and 70s.) program in 1976. She retired from the university in 2000.

Naylor headed the Long Island Studies Institute starting in 1985, publishing books and encouraging amateur local historians to submit research for compendiums. She was recognized by Cornell University lecturer Carol Kammen for her contribution to the study of Long Island's local history and for local historians at large.

== Bibliography ==
=== Author ===
- Natalie A. Naylor (1994). The Roots and Heritage of Hempstead Town. Interlaken, New York: Heart of the Lakes Publishing. ISBN 9781557871091. OCLC 32040770.
- Natalie A. Naylor (2012). Women in Long Island's past: a history of famous ladies and everyday lives. History Press. ISBN 9781609494995. OCLC 883412283.
- Natalie A. Naylor (2001). "The people called Quakers" : records of Long Island Friends, 1671-1703. Empire State Books. ISBN 9781557871589. OCLC 45816873.

=== Editor ===
- Natalie A. Naylor, Maureen O'Rourke Murphy, ed. (1998). Long Island Women: Activists and Innovators. Interlaken, New York: Empire State Books. ISBN 9781557871510. OCLC 38997110.
- Joann P. Krieg, Natalie A. Naylor, ed. (2000). Nassau County: From Rural Hinterland to Suburban Metropolis. Interlaken, New York: Empire State Books. ISBN 1-55787-156-6.
- Natalie A. Naylor, ed. (2002). Journeys on Old Long Island: Travelers' Accounts, Contemporary Descriptions, and Residents' Reminiscences 11744-1893. Interlaken, New York: Empire State Books. ISBN 1-55787-161-2.
