= Doreen Spooner =

Doreen Spooner (30 January 1928 – 20 April 2019) was the first woman to work as a staff photographer on a Fleet Street newspaper during a forty-year career, mostly on the Daily Mirror.

== Career ==
Doreen Spooner was born in Muswell Hill, North London on 30 January 1928, to Ada (née Tribe) and Len Spooner. She was encouraged in her career choice by her father Len, picture editor at the Daily Herald. Several other men in her family were employed on other papers. At the age of eight, her father bought her a five-shilling camera from Woolworth. After taking a photographic course at the Bolt Court School of Photography, Spooner worked briefly for the Keystone Picture Agency then joined the Daily Mirror from 1949, employed by Simon Clyne, picture editor, when very few women were employed as news photographers in Britain.

== Daily Mirror ==
In 1950, Spooner won the British News Picture of The Year award with her portrait of playwright George Bernard Shaw at his garden gate. Her photograph of the young Princess Elizabeth was widely shown in Britain's cinemas during the National Anthem, as well as in international press at the time of the Accession. Spooner photographed the Duke and Duchess of Windsor during the promotion of his book A King's Story.

== America ==
Despite these early successes, Spooner left the Mirror when offered the opportunity to tour America as a freelancer with the Keystone Agency, where she took pictures of Albert Einstein and the reclusive Amish communities and made studies of small town American life in the early 1950s. She then worked in Paris for Keystone and also for the new, iconoclastic Magnum Agency where she knew, and was inspired by Henri Cartier-Bresson and Robert Capa, both of whom had worked with her father in London. In Paris, she also met Pierre Vandeputte-Manevy, a Belgian photographer who worked for Le Figaro and was later one of the photographers of The Beatles and they married in 1952. They had three children and moved back to London in the late 1950s. Having largely retired from photography to raise her children, difficult personal circumstances forced Spooner to revive her career and she rejoined the Mirror in 1963 and remained there until her retirement in 1988.

== Swinging London ==
Spooner's first front page scoop came in the summer of 1963 when, in a shadowy London pub, she candidly photographed Christine Keeler and Mandy Rice-Davies, the two notorious call girls at the heart of the Profumo Affair. In the 1960s and 70s, Spooner worked closely with Felicity Green, the Mirror's fashion editor, in promoting the revolutionary fashions and styles of 'Swinging London' and its iconic figures of those years: Mary Quant, Vidal Sassoon, Barbara Hulanicki of Biba as well as the models like Twiggy of whom Spooner was especially fond; "It was simply impossible to take a bad photograph of her." Spooner was employed during the heyday of the Daily Mirror, when it reached a circulation of around 5 million, celebrated with a party at the Royal Albert Hall, where The Beatles performed the cabaret.

In the 1970s, competition from Rupert Murdoch's Sun was threatened the Mirror's circulation and the latter began to emulate the former's 'Page Three' photographs. None of the Mirror photographers enjoyed doing this, largely because they found it professionally uninteresting, though Spooner maintains that models like Samantha Fox and Linda Lusardi never felt exploited. One of them famously remarked; "You never mind getting your kit off for Doreen. It’s like undressing in front of your granny!"

Spooner photographed darker news stories including The 1984 Miner's Strike, The Zeebrugge Ferry Disaster, the Greenham Common Peace Camp and the Toxteth Riots. She covered the royal tour of China in 1986 and was standing right beside Prince Philip when he made his famous 'slitty eyed' gaffe, chastising him for the comment.

During her career at the Mirror, Spooner's photographic subjects included Margaret Thatcher, Edward Heath, Leonard Bernstein, Tennessee Williams, Sophia Loren, Yves St. Laurent, Edith Sitwell, Freddie Mercury, Spandau Ballet, Diana Rigg and Shirley Bassey.

== Recognition ==
After her retirement, Spooner was elected a Fellow of the Royal Photographic Society and was a member of the National Council for the Training of Journalists photojournalism board, and was sought for presentations on the industry up until 2013 (for example at the Royal Photographic Society lectures on Visual Journalism).

Spooner was interviewed for the Royal Photographic Society's Journal in February 1990. In October 2016, she published her autobiography Camera Girl, published by Mirror Books. Some details of her career are also to be found in Ladies of the Street by Liz Hodgkinson, She featured in the BBC Radio 2 series First Ladies Of The Street, in an episode broadcast in December 2018
