= Dutch: A Memoir of Ronald Reagan =

1999 book by Edmund Morris

- First edition cover
- Author: Edmund Morris
- Subject: Ronald Reagan
- Publisher: Modern Library
- Publication date: 1999
- Publication place: United States
- Media type: Print (hardcover)
- Pages: 874
- ISBN: 978-0-375-75645-0

Dutch: A Memoir of Ronald Reagan is a 1999 biography by Edmund Morris recounting the life of United States president Ronald Reagan. Although it was conceived as the first authorized biography of an incumbent U.S. president, Morris instead wrote from the perspective of a fictional lifelong friend of Reagan, and the book has been characterized as a semi-biographical novel. Upon its publication by Random House, Dutch faced immediate controversy, as critics disagreed with Morris's use of fictional elements within an ostensibly biographical work which Reagan and his family had trusted Morris to write factually.

In addition to the narrator (who is named Edmund Morris but shares no biographical similarities to the book's author), Dutch features numerous other imagined characters, including the narrator's fictional wife and son and a gossip columnist whose nonexistent correspondence the narrator cites. To write Dutch, Morris spoke to Reagan over a period of thirteen years and was granted special access to the Reagan administration and the White House. He found the information that he gained unsatisfactory, which led him to write a semi-autobiographical novel rather than a normal biography.

== Contents ==
Dutch deliberately makes no distinction between real and imagined events. It includes citations and footnotes to invented sources to lend realism to the fictional scenes, as well as an experimental format that includes screenplays and camera directions, to parallel Reagan's real career as a film actor.

The book is narrated by a fictional Edmund Morris, who shares no biographical similarities with the author. The narrator is a childhood friend of Ronald Reagan who is saved from drowning by Reagan during their childhood; he then attends college with Reagan and serves under Reagan in the U.S. Army Air Forces. The narrator's wife, Sydney, dies young. They have a son, named Gavin, who serves as a political foil to Reagan in the book's narrative; Gavin attends the University of California, Berkeley and commits suicide in response to Reagan's response to 1969 campus protests. The narrator is also friends with a fictional gossip columnist, named Paul Rae, who sends correspondence that is cited throughout the book.

There are also historical inaccuracies in the book: Morris erroneously suggests that Soviet rule was welcomed by Belarus and Ukraine, and that Reagan based the Strategic Defense Initiative off of Edgar Rice Burroughs' novel, A Princess of Mars. A 115-page section at the book's end contains a collection of factual information.

== Composition and publication ==
After Morris won the Pulitzer Prize for Biography and American Book Award in 1980 for The Rise of Theodore Roosevelt, he was invited to write an authorized biography of Ronald Reagan by his wife Nancy Reagan and political consultant Michael Deaver. The project was intended to be the first authorized biography of a sitting United States president. Morris was given unprecedented access to the White House, including permission to speak to the cabinet and staff, conduct a thirty-minute interview with Reagan each month, and attend White House meetings that did not pertain to national security. Random House gave Morris a $3 million advance to submit the completed manuscript by 1993.

Morris spoke to Reagan and his family, rivals, and friends over the course of thirteen years from 1980 to 1993. Morris also conducted independent research into Reagan's life and, after Reagan left office as president in 1989, Morris travelled him and his family.

Despite this extensive period of research and study, Morris later claimed that the information he garnered was insufficient to write a compelling biography. He described Reagan as an "apparent airhead" and complained about Reagan's answers to his questions as banal and incoherent. "Nobody around him understood him," Morris said. "I, every person I interviewed, almost without exception, eventually would say, 'You know, I could never really figure him out.'"

Out of frustration, Morris turned to the prospect of writing a semi-fictional work, presented as a memoir. Adapting techniques which had previously been a feature of postmodern literature, Morris presented fiction as fact. However, Morris anticipated that Dutch would be read as a work of fiction rather than as an authoritative biography and insisted that it would be easy for readers to discern fiction from fact within the book.

After he missed the initial 1993 deadline and accumulated debts equal to twice the advance payment, Random House threatened to recoup the advance if he abandoned the project. However, he completed the book, which was edited by Robert Loomis and published in 1999.

== Reception ==
Dutch received mixed reviews. Multiple reviewers felt that it was dishonest and inappropriate for Morris to include fictional elements in what was supposed to have been an authorized biography of Ronald Reagan or for disregarding the value of pure history. Many critics said that a professional historian, rather than a lay writer, should have written Reagan's official biography, while others compared the book unfavorably to The Rise of Theodore Roosevelt. The Reagan family also had a negative reaction to the book, as Reagan, who had Alzheimer's disease, had lost his ability to recount his own story by 1999. Albert Scardino of New Statesman wrote, "Dutch himself has left for an unvisitable world, his memory erased by Alzheimer's."

Francine Fialkoff of Library Journal noted that Dutch lacked annotations to help the reader discern what was real and what was not and argued that Morris and Random House should not have initially promoted Dutch as a biography.

Morris also received praise, including from Christopher Lehmann-Haupt, and criticism for the unorthodox style of the writing. Other reviewers, including Minsoo Kang, parodied Morris' unconventional approach by recounting fictional conversations with Morris.

Joan Didion faulted Morris as beholden to Reagan and his administration and incurious about political matters, particularly the Iran–Contra affair.
