= Edmund Morris (writer) =

South African-American writer and historian (1940–2019)

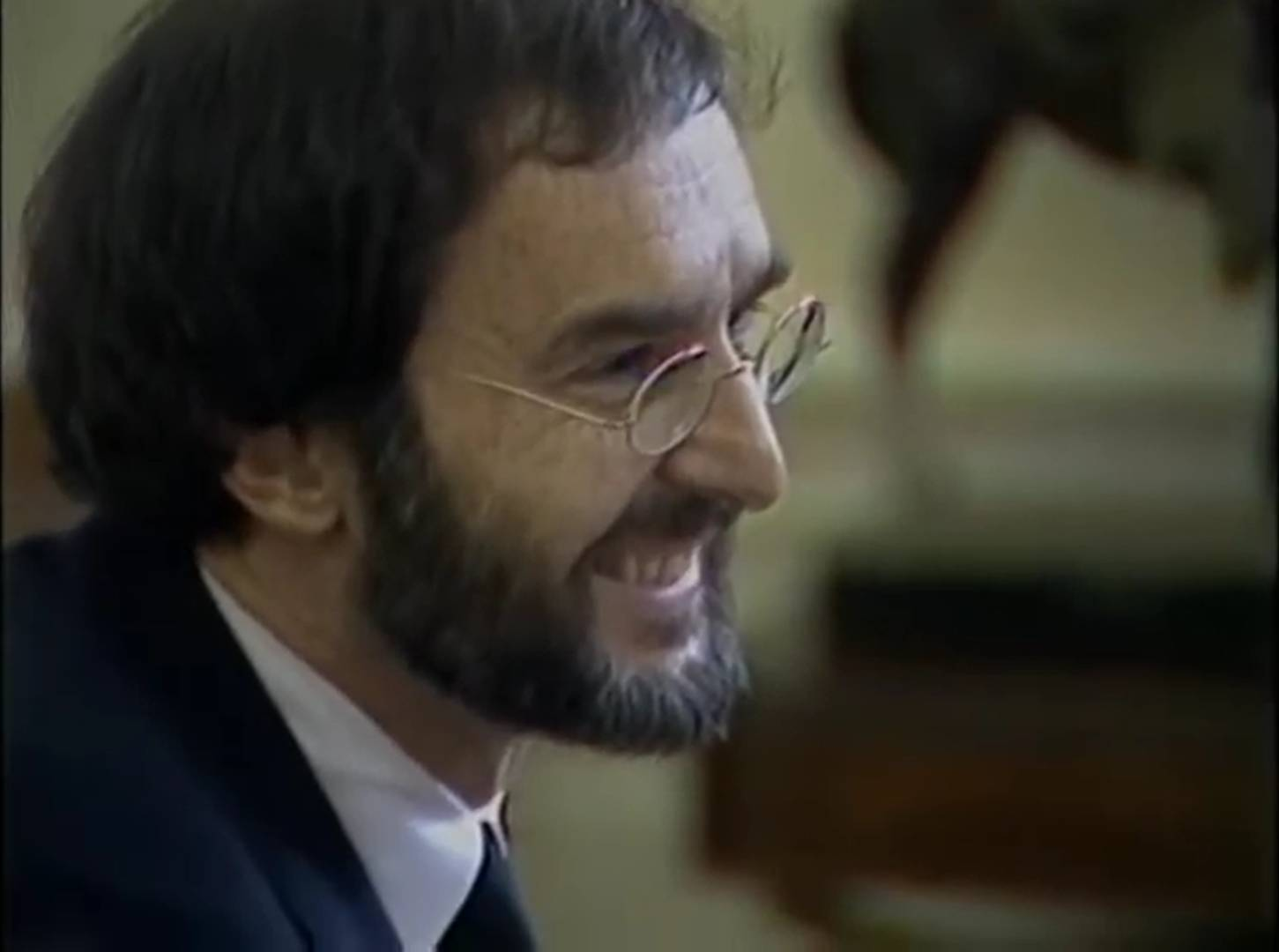
- Morris in 1985
- Born: May 27, 1940; Nairobi, Kenya Colony
- Died: May 24, 2019 (aged 78); Danbury, Connecticut, U.S.
- Education: Rhodes University
- Occupation: Writer
- Spouse: Sylvia Jukes (m. 1966)
- Writing career
- Subjects: American history
- Notable works: The Rise of Theodore Roosevelt; Dutch: A Memoir of Ronald Reagan
- Notable awards: Pulitzer Prize for Biography or Autobiography (1980)

Arthur Edmund Morris (May 27, 1940 – May 24, 2019) was a South African and American writer, known for his biographies of U.S. Presidents. His 1979 book The Rise of Theodore Roosevelt won the Pulitzer Prize for Biography or Autobiography and was the first of a trilogy of books on Roosevelt. However, Morris sparked controversy with his 1999 book, Dutch: A Memoir of Ronald Reagan, due to its extensive use of fictional elements.

== Early life ==
Morris was born in Nairobi, Kenya, the son of South African parents May (Dowling) and Eric Edmund Morris, an airline pilot.

He received his early, British-influenced education in Kenya and then studied music, art, and literature at Rhodes University in Grahamstown, South Africa. Dropping out of college in 1961, he worked in the retail advertising department of a menswear store in Durban. Most of the brochures and advertisements he designed and wrote were for the Zulu market, and he later claimed that this early training in "making words move merchandise" was invaluable to the formation of his literary style. Moving to Britain in 1964, he abandoned dreams of becoming a concert pianist and was employed as a copywriter in the London office of Foote, Cone & Belding, an American advertising agency.

== Career ==
Morris's first book, The Rise of Theodore Roosevelt, was the first volume of what would eventually become a trilogy on the life of the 26th president and won the 1980 Pulitzer Prize for Biography or Autobiography and the 1980 National Book Award for biography.

=== Dutch: A Memoir of Ronald Reagan ===
In 1981, Ronald Reagan became President of the United States and was impressed by a reading of The Rise of Theodore Roosevelt. Senator Mark O. Hatfield of Oregon and Librarian of Congress Daniel J. Boorstin urged Reagan aides to appoint Morris as the president's official biographer. Morris met with Reagan on several occasions in 1981 to 1983, but was reluctant to put aside work on Theodore Rex, the second volume of his life of Roosevelt. However, in 1985 Morris recognized that Reagan had become a figure of high historical importance, and signed a $3 million contract with Random House to write his authorized biography. He reached a private agreement with the president and first lady that granted him regular interviews with them and their children, as well as unlimited access to the White House, by means of a pass that made him a non-governmental observer of the administration. This "fly-on-the-wall" privilege was made doubly unusual by Reagan's willingness to let Morris write his biography without any editorial control.

Morris spent the next fourteen years researching and writing the story of Reagan's life in Washington, D.C., and Santa Monica, California. He continued to see the former president in retirement, and worked extensively in the Ronald Reagan Presidential Library, enjoying special access to Reagan's personal papers. His manuscript, prepared under conditions of great secrecy, was edited by Robert Loomis, executive editor at Random House. The biography's long gestation was the result of a radical change in narrative method, caused by Morris's frustration with what he has described as Reagan's lack of "curiosity about himself." Morris confided his frustration in 1989 to a group of fellow scholars at the University of Virginia's Miller Center of Public Affairs. His remarks were leaked to the press and gave rise to rumors that Morris did not understand his subject.

In 1999, Morris published Dutch: A Memoir of Ronald Reagan. The book caused an international sensation because it was presented, without explanation or apology, as a work of nonfiction by an imaginary author. Although the story of Reagan's life was authentic and documented with 153 pages of notes, the parallel "story" of its author, one "Arthur Edmund Morris" born in Chicago in 1912, enraged many critics and readers who had been expecting a conventional presidential biography. Dutch rose quickly to No. 2 on the New York Times Best Seller list. But despite a minority of favorable reviews, and the endorsements of three of Reagan's children, reactions to it were generally so negative that it soon fell off the list.

Morris explained in many interviews that his book's unique narrative form, a memoir written by a close observer of whom Reagan is never really aware, was a literary device reflecting the essentially thespian nature of his subject. Reagan, he said, was an enigma to anyone who sought to explain him by orthodox means. Widely beloved, the man had no close friends; seemingly passive and gentle, he yet exerted unstoppable force; although his id was formidable, he had no personal vanity. On CBS's 60 Minutes, Morris told Lesley Stahl:

He was truly one of the strangest men who's ever lived. Nobody around him understood him. I, every person I interviewed, almost without exception, eventually would say, "You know, I could never really figure him out."

Morris said that literary comprehension came when he stopped trying to separate Reagan the performer ("I've got the biggest theatre in the world right here," the president once joked in the Oval Office) from the performance itself. Like most born actors, "Dutch" came alive only on stage. His biographer therefore had to be, in effect, his audience, right from the time when "Arthur Edmund Morris" first became aware of "Dutch" Reagan in the early 1920s, through to the actual acquaintance of author and subject half a century later. Morris believed that any reader willing to join him in watching The Ronald Reagan Story [his original title for the book] would yield to it as a drama true in every biographical detail.

=== Later works ===
Theodore Rex, which followed Dutch in 2002, was in contrast a straight account of Theodore Roosevelt's Presidency (1901–1909). Morris pointed out that "TR" was a subject so self-explanatory as to obviate any authorial intrusion into the narrative. The book, published by Random House, won the 2001 Los Angeles Times Book Prize for Biography. Three years later Morris published Beethoven: The Universal Composer, a short biography that sought to convey in plain prose the essence of great music. Colonel Roosevelt, the final book in Morris's Theodore Roosevelt trilogy, came out in 2010. City Journal called it "one of the best biographies in modern literature".

In October 2012, Morris published This Living Hand and Other Essays, an autobiographical collection of pieces on literature, music, and the presidency. Random House simultaneously announced that his next book would be a biography of Thomas Edison, which was published in October 2019.

== Personal life ==
Morris wrote extensively on travel and the arts for such publications as The New Yorker, The New York Times, and Harper's Magazine. He lived in New York City and Kent, Connecticut, with his wife and fellow biographer, Sylvia Jukes Morris, whom he married in 1966.

== Death and legacy ==
Morris died from a stroke at a hospital in Danbury, Connecticut, on May 24, 2019, aged 78. His widow died the following January.

In 2024, Dickinson State University announced that it would house the 151-box collection of Morris's Theodore Roosevelt research. The scholarship of his wife, Sylvia Jukes Morris, who wrote books on Edith Roosevelt and Clare Booth Luce is also included in the collection.

== Bibliography ==
- The Rise of Theodore Roosevelt. New York: Coward, McCann & Geoghegan. 1979. ISBN 0-375-75678-7.
- Dutch: A Memoir of Ronald Reagan. New York: Random House. 1999. ISBN 0-394-55508-2.
- Theodore Rex. New York: Random House. 2001. ISBN 978-0-394-55509-6.
- Beethoven: The Universal Composer. New York: Atlas Books/HarperCollins. 2005. ISBN 0-06-075974-7.
- Colonel Roosevelt. New York: Random House. 2010. ISBN 978-0-375-50487-7.
- This Living Hand and Other Essays. New York: Random House. 2012. ISBN 978-0-8129-9312-7.
- Edison. New York: Random House. 2019. ISBN 978-0-8129-9311-0.
