= Colonel Roosevelt =

Biography of Theodore Roosevelt by Edmund Morris

- Author: Edmund Morris
- Subject: Theodore Roosevelt
- Genre: biography, non-fiction
- Publisher: Random House
- Publication date: 2010
- Pages: xii, 766 pages
- ISBN: 9780375504877
- OCLC: 526027101
- Preceded by: Theodore Rex

Colonel Roosevelt (2010) is a biography of U.S. President Theodore Roosevelt written by author Edmund Morris released on November 23, 2010. It is the third volume of a trilogy, following the Pulitzer Prize-winning The Rise of Theodore Roosevelt (1979) and Theodore Rex (2001).

Colonel Roosevelt covers the years after Theodore Roosevelt leaves the presidency in 1909 to his death in 1919.
