= Theodore Rex (book) =

2001 biography of Theodore Roosevelt by Edmund Morris

- First edition
- Author: Edmund Morris
- Cover artist: John Singer Sargent
- Language: English
- Subject: Theodore Roosevelt
- Genre: Biography
- Publisher: Random House
- Publication date: November 20, 2001
- Publication place: United States
- ISBN: 978-0-394-55509-6
- Preceded by: The Rise of Theodore Roosevelt
- Followed by: Colonel Roosevelt

Theodore Rex (2001) is a biography of U.S. President Theodore Roosevelt written by author Edmund Morris. It is the second volume of a trilogy, preceded by the Pulitzer Prize-winning The Rise of Theodore Roosevelt (1979) and succeeded by Colonel Roosevelt which was published on November 23, 2010.

Theodore Rex covers the years of the presidency of Theodore Roosevelt, from 1901 to 1909, covering events such as the construction of the Panama Canal, as well as the Roosevelt Administration's political, diplomatic and military exploits during the aforementioned period.

== Critical reception ==
In City Journal, critic Ryan L. Cole praised the book along with the rest of the trilogy. He said that Theodore Rex showed the apotheosis of Roosevelt's life in a way that is "epic in scope and vast in detail". The work has also been criticized by others as having “generated no lasting ideas, no new perspectives”.

The book won the 2001 Los Angeles Times Book Prize for Biography.
