= The Rise of Theodore Roosevelt =

1979 book by Edmund Morris

- First edition
- Author: Edmund Morris
- Language: English
- Subject: Theodore Roosevelt
- Genre: Biography
- Publisher: Coward, McCann & Geoghegan
- Publication date: 1979
- Publication place: United States
- ISBN: 978-0-698-10783-0
- Followed by: Theodore Rex

The Rise of Theodore Roosevelt (1979) is a biography of United States President Theodore Roosevelt by Edmund Morris and published by Coward, McCann & Geoghegan when the author was forty years old. It is the first in a trilogy continued more than twenty and thirty years later by Theodore Rex (2001) and Colonel Roosevelt (2010). It won the 1980 Pulitzer Prize for Biography or Autobiography and the 1980 National Book Award in Biography. (Note: This was the 1980 award for hardcover Biography. From 1980 to 1983 in National Book Award history there were dual hardcover and paperback awards in most categories, and multiple nonfiction subcategories. Most of the paperback award-winners were reprints, including the 1980 Biography.)

== Description ==
The Rise covers the time from Roosevelt's birth through his ascendancy to the Presidency. It includes the Roosevelt family history starting with his parents' influence, his turbulent childhood illnesses, education, involvement in politics, and political accomplishments that prepared him to be one of the most influential presidents of the modern era. Specific topics include the philosophy of Roosevelt's father, mother, and his family. His passion for learning despite severe illness is well documented. Morris reports that Roosevelt probably read the equivalent of one book per day during his life.

Morris examines his life as a young politician driven by a sense of public duty and stewardship, and captures multiple aspects of the events that shaped the character and performance of Roosevelt. The book provides insight into the world of influence from a master of corporate power as opposed to leaders who practice personal power.

Topics include early childhood, education and hobbies, travels in Europe and Africa, New York legislature, frontier life, civil service commissioner, New York police commissioner, Assistant Secretary of the Navy, the Rough Riders and victory in Cuba, governor of New York, and short term as vice-president.

== In other media ==
=== Film ===
A planned film adaptation by director Martin Scorsese and starring Leonardo DiCaprio was scheduled to be released in 2013. However, that project was abandoned.
