= Deaths in June 2019 =

The following is a list of notable deaths in June 2019.

Entries for each day are listed alphabetically by surname. A typical entry lists information in the following sequence:

- Name, age, country of citizenship at birth, subsequent country of citizenship (if applicable), reason for notability, cause of death (if known), and reference.

== June 2019 ==
=== 1 ===
- Camille Billops, 85, American sculptor, filmmaker, archivist and printmaker.
- Leah Chase, 96, American Creole chef.
- Bruno Civitico, 76, Italian-born American painter.
- Glen Cressman, 84, Canadian ice hockey player (Montreal Canadiens).
- Jovan Dejanović, 91, Serbian politician, mayor of Novi Sad (1974-1982).
- Nikola Dinev, 65, Bulgarian Olympic wrestler, world champion (1977, 1982).
- Han Kuang-wei, 89, Taiwanese military officer and engineer, member of Academia Sinica.
- Stephen Heilmann, 77, Greenlandic politician and journalist.
- Ruth Laxson, 94, American artist.
- Lee Shin Cheng, 79, Malaysian oil executive and property developer (IOI Group).
- Christobel Mattingley, 87, Australian writer.
- John Myers, 60, British radio executive (GMG Radio, Radio Academy) and presenter, cancer.
- Sibongile Nkomo, 63, South African politician, Secretary-General of the Inkatha Freedom Party and MP.
- Charles Reid, 81, American painter.
- José Antonio Reyes, 35, Spanish footballer (Sevilla, Atlético Madrid, national team), traffic collision.
- Michel Serres, 88, French philosopher, theorist and writer.
- Harry C. Triandis, 92, Greek-born American psychologist.
- Fons van de Vijver, 66, Dutch psychologist, brain haemorrhage.
- Alasdair Walker, 62, British physician and naval officer, brain cancer.
- Matt Wrbican, 60, American archivist and writer, brain cancer.
- Ani Yudhoyono, 66, Indonesian socialite, First Lady (2004–2014), leukaemia.

=== 2 ===
- Momtazuddin Ahmed, 84, Bangladeshi playwright and educationist.
- Yannick Bellon, 95, French film director (Rape of Love).
- Luigi Biscardi, 90, Italian politician, Senator (1992–2001), Mayor of Larino (1956–1960).
- Steven Allan Boggs, 72, American scientist, brain cancer.
- Piet Botha, 63, South African rock musician, pancreatic cancer.
- Alistair Browning, 65, New Zealand actor (The Lord of the Rings, Vertical Limit, Power Rangers Dino Charge), cancer.
- Neeta Choudhary, 50, Indian politician, MLA (2010–2015), complications from blast injuries.
- P. K. Dharmalingam, 84, Indian cricketer (Madras, Services).
- Donald M. Fraser, 95, American politician, member of the U.S. House of Representatives (1963–1979), Mayor of Minneapolis (1980–1994).
- Jacob W. Gruber, 98, American archaeologist and anthropologist.
- Barry Hughes, 81, Welsh football manager (Go Ahead Eagles, Sparta Rotterdam, HFC Haarlem).
- Iftikhar-ul-Hasan Kandhlawi, 97, Indian Islamic scholar.
- Alexey Kazannik, 77, Russian lawyer and politician, Prosecutor General (1993–1994) and Deputy Governor of Omsk Oblast (1995–2003).
- Jerry Krall, 92, American football player (Detroit Lions).
- Lawrence Leathers, 37, American jazz drummer, asphyxiated.
- Lee Siu-kei, 69, Hong Kong actor, liver cancer.
- Luisinho Lemos, 67, Brazilian football player and manager (America), heart attack.
- Walter Lübcke, 65, German politician, shot.
- Henry T. Lynch, 91, American physician and cancer genetic researcher, namesake of Lynch syndrome.
- Ken Matthews, 84, English race walker, Olympic champion (1964).
- Arthur A. McGiverin, 90, American judge, Justice of the Iowa Supreme Court (1978–2000).
- Nazmul Huda Mintu, 76, Bangladeshi film director.
- Stuart Mustow, 90, British civil engineer.
- Lowell North, 89, American sailor, five-time world champion, Olympic champion (1968).
- Mart Nutt, 57, Estonian politician and historian, MP (since 1992).
- Bingo O'Malley, 86, American actor (Creepshow, Super 8, Out of the Furnace).
- Maciej Parowski, 72, Polish science fiction writer and editor (Nowa Fantastyka).
- Don Pederson, 90, American politician, member of the Nebraska Legislature (1996–2007), pancreatic cancer.
- Noa Pothoven, 17, Dutch mental health activist and author, voluntary starvation.
- Alan Rollinson, 76, British racing driver, cancer.
- Mahmoud Soufi, 47, Qatari footballer (national team).

=== 3 ===
- Syed Waseem Akhtar, 62, Pakistani politician, member of the Provincial Assembly of the Punjab.
- Hans Ankum, 88, Dutch legal scholar.
- Atsushi Aoki, 41, Japanese professional wrestler (AJPW, NOAH), traffic collision.
- Javier Barreda, 52, Peruvian politician, Minister of Labour and Promotion of Employment (2018), heart attack.
- Larry Beck, 79, American golfer.
- David Bergland, 83, American politician, chair of the Libertarian National Committee (1977–1981, 1998–2000), prostate cancer.
- André Bertrand, 88, Canadian Olympic alpine skier.
- Agustina Bessa-Luís, 96, Portuguese writer.
- Jean-Louis Bodin, 75, French racing cyclist.
- Ellen Bree Burns, 95, American senior judge, (former chief) judge of the Federal District Court for the District of Connecticut (1988–1992).
- Ian Craft, 81, British physician.
- Roy Cruttenden, 94, British Olympic long jumper (1956).
- Paul Darrow, 78, English actor (Blake's 7, Doctor Who).
- Blaine Earon, 90, American football player (Detroit Lions).
- Fabrizio Fabbri, 70, Italian racing cyclist.
- Guy François, 71, Haitian footballer (Violette, national team), heart attack.
- Evangelina García Prince, 84, Venezuelan women's rights activist, politician and academic, Senator (1988–1991, 1994–1996) and member of the Comisión para la Reforma del Estado.
- He Yi-hang, 62, Taiwanese television host and actor, colorectal cancer.
- Jan Jankowicz, 86, Polish Olympic gymnast.
- Jurica Jerković, 69, Croatian footballer (Hajduk Split, Zürich, Yugoslavia national team).
- Hal Krebs, 81, Canadian football player (Calgary Stampeders, Montreal Alouettes, Edmonton Eskimos).
- Duchess Woizlawa Feodora of Mecklenburg, 100, German royal.
- Simjon Rosenfeld, 96, Polish-born Israeli Holocaust survivor.
- Michael Rumaker, 87, American writer.
- Tang Dingyuan, 99, Chinese physicist, academician of the Chinese Academy of Sciences.
- Ruma Guha Thakurta, 84, Indian actress and singer.
- Stanley Tigerman, 88, American architect (Illinois Holocaust Museum and Education Center), chronic obstructive pulmonary disease.
- Stanisław Wróblewski, 59, Polish Olympic wrestler (1980).

=== 4 ===
- Alene S. Ammond, 86, American politician, New Jersey Senator (1974–1978), pneumonia.
- Keith Birdsong, 59, American illustrator (Star Trek, Shadowrun), complications of cerebral hemorrhage from traffic collision.
- Philip George Burke, 86, British physicist.
- Emerson Cole, 91, American football player (Cleveland Browns, Chicago Bears).
- Roger Covell, 88, Australian musicologist, critic and author.
- George Darwin, 87, English footballer (Derby County).
- Léonard Dhejju, 88, Congolese Roman Catholic prelate, Bishop of Uvira (1981–1984) and Bunia (1984–2002).
- Billy Gabor, 97, American basketball player (Syracuse Orangemen, Syracuse Nationals).
- Milton Gordon, 100, American sociologist.
- Robin Herd, 80, British engineer, designer and businessman, co-founder of March Engineering.
- Teruko Ishizaka, 92, Japanese immunologist, pneumonia.
- Lennart Johansson, 89, Swedish sports official, president of UEFA (1990–2007).
- Max Kay, 82, Scottish-born Australian entertainer and manager (Andy Stewart), pneumonia as a complication of cancer.
- Lawrie Leslie, 84, Scottish footballer (Hibernian, Stoke City, national team).
- Billy Mayo, 61, American actor.
- E. Eean McNaughton, 87, American architect.
- Zakaria Ben Mustapha, 93, Tunisian politician, Mayor of Tunis (1980–1986) and Minister of Culture (1986–1988).
- John Neff, 87, American investor.
- Padraigín Ní Mhurchú, 70, Irish trade unionist.
- Joe Overstreet, 85, American painter.
- Nechama Rivlin, 73, Israeli academic and scientist, First Lady (since 2014), complications from lung transplant.
- Antoni Roig Muntaner, 87, Spanish chemist and politician.
- Geevarghese Mar Timotheos, 91, Indian Eastern Catholic prelate, Bishop of Tiruvalla (1988–2003).
- Laurel L. Wilkening, 74, American planetary scientist.

=== 5 ===
- Dinyar Contractor, 79, Indian actor (Mujhse Shaadi Karogi, Chori Chori Chupke Chupke, Dam Dama Dam).
- David Y. Copeland III, 88, American politician, member of the Tennessee House of Representatives (1968–1992).
- Noël Desaubliaux, 96, French Olympic sailor (1960).
- Claire Donovan, 71, British historian.
- Robert Earle, 93, American game show host (College Bowl).
- Aubrey Gatewood, 80, American baseball player (Los Angeles/California Angels, Atlanta Braves).
- Leo Houtsonen, 60, Finnish footballer (KuPS Kuopio, OPS Oulu, national team).
- Alejandro Jadresic, 62, Chilean engineer and politician, Minister of Energy (1994–1998), brain cancer.
- Jan Karwecki, 70, Polish footballer (Lech Poznań, Szombierki Bytom, national team).
- Wilfried Kohlars, 79, German footballer (TSV 1860 Munich).
- Geoff Lees, 85, English footballer (Barnsley, Bradford City).
- Raymond Louw, 92, South African journalist.
- John Lynch, 85, Irish Gaelic footballer (Roscommon).
- Johnny McGrath, 87–88, Irish hurler (Tipperary).
- Mohamed Negm, 75, Egyptian actor and comedian, stroke.
- Jonathan Nichols, 53, American politician, member of the Oklahoma Senate (2001–2013), shot.
- Lloyd John Ogilvie, 88, American Presbyterian minister, Chaplain of the U.S. Senate (1995–2003).
- Prakash Pant, 58, Indian politician, Finance Minister of Uttarakhand (since 2017), cancer.
- Sir David Plastow, 87, British automobile and medical research executive.
- Albert Rohan, 83, Austrian diplomat, Permanent Secretary of the Austrian Foreign Minister (1996–2001).
- Herbert Sandler, 87, American banker (Golden West Financial).
- Elio Sgreccia, 90, Italian Roman Catholic cardinal, President of Pontifical Academy for Life (2005–2008).
- Stan Smith, 94, Australian footballer (Collingwood).
- Peter Toogood, 89, Australian amateur golfer.
- Marino Venturini, 74–75, Sammarinese politician, Captain Regent (1976, 1982, 1986, 1995–1996).

=== 6 ===
- Joan Callahan, 76, American philosopher, liver cancer.
- Sharon Cather, 71, American art historian.
- John Gunther Dean, 93, American diplomat.
- Dr. John, 77, American Hall of Fame singer-songwriter ("I Walk on Guilded Splinters", "Right Place, Wrong Time"), heart attack.
- Maida Heatter, 102, American pastry chef.
- Alexander Kuznetsov, 59, Russian-born American actor (The Alaska Kid, The Peacemaker, Space Cowboys).
- Dave Marshall, 76, American baseball player (New York Mets, San Francisco Giants).
- Rolf Maurer, 81, Swiss road racing cyclist.
- Schubert M. Ogden, 91, American theologian.
- Bolesław Pylak, 97, Polish Roman Catholic prelate, Bishop and Archbishop of Lublin (1975–1997).
- Johnny Robinson, 83, English footballer (Bury, Oldham Athletic).
- Enver Sajjad, 84, Pakistani playwright.
- M. Sathyanarayana, 74, Indian politician, MLA (2008–2013).
- Dick Sedar, 88, American politician.
- Seiko Tanabe, 91, Japanese author, cholangitis.
- Harry Thomson, 85, Malawian politician.
- Jota Mario Valencia, 63, Colombian television presenter, stroke.
- Ned Wheeler, 87, Irish hurler (Wexford).

=== 7 ===
- Noémi Ban, 96, Hungarian-born American public speaker and Holocaust survivor.
- Jules Blattner, 78, American singer and guitarist.
- Max Bösiger, 85, Swiss Olympic boxer.
- Ryszard Bugajski, 76, Polish film director (Interrogation, Clearcut, Generał Nil).
- Eva Côté, 85, Canadian politician, MP (1980–1984).
- Franklyn Edwards, 81, Montserratian cricketer.
- Nello Governato, 80, Italian footballer (Lazio, Como, Savona).
- Nonnie Griffin, 85, Canadian actress (The Believers, Good Fences, If You Could See What I Hear) and voice actress, ruptured aortic aneurysm.
- Narciso Ibáñez Serrador, 83, Uruguayan-born Spanish film director (The House That Screamed, Who Can Kill a Child?, Historias para no dormir), urinary tract infection.
- Elisabeta Ionescu, 66, Romanian Olympic handball player, world championship silver medalist (1973).
- Noel Lloyd, 72, Welsh academic, vice-chancellor of Aberystwyth University (2004–2011).
- Zhanneta Metallidi, 85, Russian composer and music educator.
- Julie Payne, 78, American actress (Island of the Blue Dolphins, Don't Make Waves), chronic obstructive pulmonary disease.
- Elżbieta Porzec, 74, Polish volleyball player (national team), Olympic bronze medalist (1968).
- Tony Rodham, 64, American presidential campaigner (1992, 2008, 2016) and business consultant.
- Donald E. Wilkes Jr., 74, American legal scholar.

=== 8 ===
- Milan Asadurov, 69, Bulgarian science fiction writer.
- Lucho Avilés, 81, Uruguayan-born Argentine entertainment journalist.
- Jenny Berthelius, 95, Swedish author.
- Wim Betz, 76, Belgian physician.
- Spencer Bohren, 69, American roots guitarist, prostate cancer.
- Guy Bois, 84, French historian.
- Jorge Brovetto, 86, Uruguayan engineer, academic and politician, President of Broad Front (2004–2012) and Minister of Education and Culture (2005–2008).
- John Causby, 76, Australian cricketer (South Australia).
- Adelaide M. Cromwell, 99, American sociologist.
- Amitha de Costa, 70, Sri Lankan cricketer (Sri Lanka).
- Norman Dewis, 98, British racing driver and engineer (Jaguar Cars).
- Justin Edinburgh, 49, English football player (Tottenham Hotspur) and manager (Leyton Orient), cardiac arrest.
- Arthur Frackenpohl, 95, American composer.
- Kiron Kumar Gogoi, 64, Indian politician, MLA (1985–1991).
- Jerry Gollub, 74, American physicist.
- Helmut Haid, 80, Austrian Olympic athlete (1964).
- Bob Henderson, 85, Australian footballer (Fitzroy).
- Karl Hurm, 88, German painter.
- Marja Leinonen, 73, Finnish linguist.
- Stefano Li Side, 92, Chinese clandestine Roman Catholic prelate, Bishop of Tianjin (since 1982).
- Frank Lucchesi, 92, American baseball player, coach and manager (Texas Rangers).
- Pierre Mambele, 74, Congolese taxi driver.
- Andre Matos, 47, Brazilian singer (Viper, Angra, Shaman), heart attack.
- Renzo Patria, 85, Italian politician, Deputy (1979–2006).
- Eric Patterson, 26, American football player (Indianapolis Colts, New England Patriots), shot.
- Abdul Baset al-Sarout, 27, Syrian footballer and militant, shot.
- Yehuda Talit, 74, Israeli businessman and record producer.
- Willie Williams, 67, American karateka, heart disease.

=== 9 ===
- Humberto Álvarez, 89, Colombian footballer (Atlético Nacional, Deportivo Cali, Independiente Medellín).
- İbrahim Balaban, 98, Turkish painter, multiple organ failure.
- Yves Bot, 71, French magistrate, Advocate General of the European Court of Justice (since 2006).
- Bill Bryant, 78, English rugby league player (Castleford).
- Bushwick Bill, 52, Jamaican-American rapper (Geto Boys), pancreatic cancer.
- Pádraig Carney, 91, Irish Gaelic footballer (Mayo).
- Ahmed Essop, 87, Indian-born South African writer.
- Nadjmeddin Farabi, 85, Iranian Olympic decathlete.
- Erla Bergendahl Hohler, 81, Norwegian archaeologist and art historian.
- Erich Iltgen, 78, German politician, president of the Landtag of Saxony (1990–2009).
- Russell Jones, 93, British orientalist.
- Maryon Kantaroff, 85, Canadian sculptor, complications from pneumonia.
- László Lantos, 80, Hungarian Olympic swimmer (1960).
- Ma Ju-lung, 80, Taiwanese actor (Cape No. 7, Monga, Warriors of the Rainbow: Seediq Bale), infection.
- Mary Max, 52, American animal rights activist.
- Rafael Miguel, 22, Brazilian actor (Chiquititas), shot.
- Adela Neffa, 96, Argentine-born Uruguayan sculptor.
- Joe Dan Osceola, 82, American Seminole tribal chief.
- Prabhakar Rao, 83, Indian cricketer (Madras).
- Gerlind Reinshagen, 93, German writer.
- Ann Roniger, 76, American athlete.
- Varley F. Sears, 81, Canadian physicist.
- Helge Stormorken, 96, Norwegian veterinarian.
- Juhani Wahlsten, 81, Finnish ice hockey player.
- Wang Hanru, 81, Chinese major general and politician.
- William D. Wittliff, 79, American screenwriter (Lonesome Dove, Legends of the Fall, The Perfect Storm), heart attack.
- Xu Datong, 90, Chinese political scientist and legal scholar.

=== 10 ===
- Beatrice Arbour, 98, American baseball player (Racine Belles).
- Elizabeth Barrett-Connor, 84, American epidemiologist, cerebral vascular disease.
- Tom Derek Bowden, 97, British military officer.
- Lewis E. Braverman, 90, American endocrinologist, Waldenström's macroglobulinemia.
- Donald M. Friedman, 90, American literary scholar.
- Yuzuru Fujimoto, 83, Japanese voice actor (Gigantor, Brave Raideen, The Big O), heart failure.
- Hao Yun, 94, Chinese translator, recipient of the Lifetime Achievement Award in Translation.
- Klaus Hahn, 93, German Olympic rower (1952).
- R. V. Janakiraman, 78, Indian politician, Chief Minister of Puducherry (1996–2000).
- Karen B. Johnson, 77, American politician.
- Mohammed Sobhi al-Judeili, 36, Palestinian paramedic, shot.
- Girish Karnad, 81, Indian film director (Godhuli), actor (Samskara, Komaram Puli) and screenwriter.
- David Orr King, 81, American politician.
- Harold Lawson, 81–82, American-Swedish computer engineer.
- Lee Hee-ho, 96, South Korean women's rights and peace activist, First Lady (1998–2003), liver cancer.
- Mario Mangiarotti, 98, Italian fencer.
- Crazy Mohan, 66, Indian actor (Michael Madhana Kamarajan, Thedinen Vanthathu, Vasool Raja MBBS), heart attack.
- Ib Nørholm, 88, Danish composer and organist.
- Sven-David Sandström, 76, Swedish composer (Jeppe: The Cruel Comedy), cancer.
- Akhtar Sarfraz, 43, Pakistani cricketer (national team), colon cancer.
- David Sawyier, 68, American Olympic rower.
- Alireza Shir Mohammad Ali, 21, Iranian political prisoner, stabbed.
- Lil' Buck Sinegal, 75, American zydeco and blues guitarist and singer.
- Michel Sitjar, 76, French rugby player (Sporting Union Agenais, XIII Catalan, national team), suicide by gunshot.
- Gene Snowden, 91, American politician.
- Sherman Utsman, 87, American racing driver (NASCAR).
- Wang Jun, 78, Chinese business executive, Chairman of the Poly Group and the CITIC Group.
- Peter Whitehead, 82, English writer and filmmaker (Wholly Communion, Charlie Is My Darling, Tonite Let's All Make Love in London).
- Cecil Woolf, 92, English author and publisher.
- Yang Yang, 44, Chinese tenor, suicide by jumping.

=== 11 ===
- Roberto Bailey, 66, Honduran footballer (Victoria, Marathón, national team), traffic collision.
- Carl Bertelsen, 81, Danish footballer (Esbjerg, Kilmarnock, national team), complications from Alzheimer's disease.
- Yvan Delsarte, 90, Belgian Olympic basketball player (1952).
- Domenico De Simone, 93, Italian politician, Mayor of Torremaggiore (1960–1976), Senator (1976–1979) and Deputy (1979–1983).
- Martin Feldstein, 79, American economist, Chairman of the Council of Economic Advisers (1982–1984).
- Gabriele Grunewald, 32, American middle-distance runner, salivary gland cancer.
- Abul Hasnat, 64, Indian politician.
- Mohaqiq Kabuli, 91, Afghan Grand Ayatollah.
- Billy McKee, 97, Irish republican, founding member and leader of the Provisional Irish Republican Army.
- Enrico Nascimbeni, 59, Italian singer, journalist and poet, heart attack.
- William Newman, 80, British computer scientist.
- Velvel Pasternak, 85, Canadian-born American musicologist.
- Francisco Miró Quesada Cantuarias, 100, Peruvian philosopher, journalist and politician, minister of public education of Peru (1963–1964).
- Riazuddin, 60, Pakistani cricket umpire, heart attack.
- Robert Sorrells, 88, American actor (Gunsmoke, Bonanza, The Twilight Zone) and convicted murderer.
- Shawn Spikes, 23, American thoroughbred jockey, drowned.
- Valeria Valeri, 97, Italian actress (Seasons of Our Love, Catherine and I, Un medico in famiglia).

=== 12 ===
- Don Benson, 99, Australian rules footballer.
- Gattu Bheemudu, 67, Indian politician, MLA (1999–2004).
- Thandi Brewer, South African filmmaker, breast cancer.
- Gary Burrell, 81, American electronics executive and philanthropist, chairman and co-founder of Garmin.
- Chang Liyi, 89, Taiwanese pilot (ROCAF), member of the Black Cat Squadron, heart attack.
- Merv Collins, 85, Canadian football player (Toronto Argonauts, Ottawa Rough Riders).
- Armand De Decker, 70, Belgian lawyer and politician, President of the Senate (1999–2004, 2007–2010).
- Te'o J. Fuavai, 82, American Samoan politician, former Senator, Speaker of the American Samoa House of Representatives (1975–19??).
- Fredrik Hagemann, 90, Norwegian geologist.
- Bridgette Jordan, 30, American record holder, world's shortest woman (2011).
- Léon Kalenga Badikebele, 62, Congolese Roman Catholic prelate, Apostolic Nuncio to Argentina (since 2018) and Archbishop of Magnetum (since 2008).
- Philomena Lynott, 88, Irish author, lung cancer.
- Wilbert J. McKeachie, 98, American psychologist.
- Sylvia Miles, 94, American actress (Midnight Cowboy, Farewell, My Lovely, She-Devil).
- Bob Mitchell, 86, American baseball player (Kansas City Monarchs).
- Julia Munro, 76, Canadian politician, member of the Legislative Assembly of Ontario (1995–2018).
- Elfriede Ott, 94, Austrian actress (Hallo – Hotel Sacher … Portier!, The Unintentional Kidnapping of Mrs. Elfriede Ott) and singer.
- Ray Rigby, 96, American politician, member of the Idaho Senate (1965–1974).
- Igor Solopov, 58, Russian-born Estonian Olympic table tennis player (1992), European championship bronze medalist (1978).
- Tsuruko Yamazaki, 94, Japanese avant-garde artist, member of the Gutai group.
- Yozo Yokota, 78, American-Japanese lawyer and professor.

=== 13 ===
- Irena Backus, 69, Polish-born Swiss historian, complications from a stroke.
- Pat Bowlen, 75, American Hall of Fame sports executive, majority owner of the Denver Broncos (since 1984), complications from Alzheimer's disease.
- Pierre DuMaine, 87, American Roman Catholic prelate, Bishop of San Jose (1981–1999).
- Dale Farley, 70, American football player (Buffalo Bills, Miami Dolphins).
- Ron Ferri, 86, American artist.
- Nature Ganganbaigal, 29, Chinese-Mongolian folk-rock musician (Tengger Cavalry) and composer.
- Edith González, 54, Mexican actress (Sí, mi amor, Bianca Vidal, Doña Bárbara) and dancer, ovarian cancer.
- Derrick Harris, 54, American music producer, kidney failure.
- Şeref Has, 82, Turkish footballer (Fenerbahçe, national team).
- A. Rahman Hassan, 73, Malaysian singer and composer.
- Derek Henderson, 93, English cricketer.
- Bourkou Louise Kabo, 84, Chadian politician, first woman Deputy (1962–1964).
- Edwin Michael Kosik, 94, American senior judge, member of the U.S. District Court for Middle Pennsylvania (since 1986).
- Licelott Marte de Barrios, 85, Dominican politician, Minister of Finance (1990–1993) and Deputy (2002–2006), cancer.
- Sean McCann, 83, Canadian actor (Night Heat, Tommy Boy, Naked Lunch), complications from heart disease.
- Menifee, 23, American racehorse, heart attack.
- R. Clayton Mitchell Jr., 83, American politician, member (1971–1992) and speaker of the Maryland House of Delegates (1987–1992).
- Rosario Parmegiani, 82, Italian water polo player, Olympic champion (1960).
- Joyce Pensato, 77, American painter.
- Jiří Pospíšil, 68, Czech Olympic basketball player (1972, 1976, 1980).
- Pazhavila Rameshan, 83, Indian journalist and poet.
- Heinrich Reichert, 69, Swiss neurobiologist.
- Raul Ruiz, 78, American journalist and civil rights activist.
- Wilhelm Wieben, 84, German journalist (Tagesschau), actor and author.
- Angus Williams, 91, American football player.
- Charles Wilson, 88, Canadian composer and conductor.
- Merilyn Wiseman, 77, New Zealand potter.

=== 14 ===
- Laura Almerich, 79, Spanish classical guitarist (Lluis Llach).
- Maurice Bénichou, 76, French actor (Animal, Amélie, Time of the Wolf).
- Roger Béteille, 97, French aeronautical engineer and businessman.
- Roland Boudreau, 83, Canadian politician, MLA (1974–1978).
- Edward Connery, 85, Canadian politician.
- Elio Cruz, 87, Gibraltarian playwright, singer and songwriter.
- Francis P. Facione, 79, American prelate (since 1975).
- George E. Felton, 98, British computer scientist, developer of GEORGE operating system.
- Babayo Garba Gamawa, 53, Nigerian politician.
- Rod Hall, 81, American off-road racing driver, progressive supranuclear palsy.
- Bernard M. Judge, 79, American newspaper editor (Chicago Sun-Times), pancreatic cancer.
- Ricardo Migliorisi, 71, Paraguayan painter and designer.
- Ning Bin, 60, Chinese control systems engineer, President of Beijing Jiaotong University (2008–2019), traffic collision.
- Anthony W. Norman, 81, American biochemist.
- Danuta Nowak-Stachow, 84, Polish Olympic gymnast.
- Vaira Paegle, 76, Latvian politician and diaspora activist.
- Dhaniram Paudel, 53, Nepalese politician, heart attack.
- K. Rathamani, 70, Indian politician, MLA (since 2016), stomach cancer.
- Martin Roth, 41, Austrian artist.
- Joseph Sambrook, 80, British molecular biologist.
- Francis Sibley, 89, American musician and academic.
- S. Sivasubramanian, 81, Indian politician, MLA (1989–1991).
- Kelvin Thomas, 99, Welsh conductor, composer and author.
- Butsaran Thongchiew, 28, Thai singer and actress.
- Ebert Van Buren, 94, American football player (Philadelphia Eagles).
- James Wyngaarden, 94, American physician and academic administrator, director of the National Institutes of Health (1982–1989).

=== 15 ===
- Daniel Colin, 85, French politician, Deputy (1986–1997).
- Trevor Elliott, 81, Australian rules footballer (Essendon, Footscray).
- David Esterly, 75, American woodcarver, amyotrophic lateral sclerosis.
- Larry Foss, 83, American baseball player (Pittsburgh Pirates, New York Mets).
- Marta Harnecker, 82, Chilean sociologist, politologist and journalist.
- Jane Hayward, 69, British actress.
- Wilhelm Holzbauer, 88, Austrian architect.
- Susannah Hunnewell, 52, American editor and publisher (The Paris Review), cancer.
- Kevin Killian, 66, American poet, cancer.
- Charles A. Reich, 91, American scholar and author (The Greening of America).
- Josl Rieder, 86, Austrian Olympic alpine skier (1956), world champion (1958).
- Beatriz Salomón, 65, Argentine actress, television presenter and singer, colon cancer.
- Wes Stewart, 74, Jamaican-born English cricketer (Middlesex).
- John Wilson, 79, Australian VFL footballer (Richmond).
- Neville Tong, 84–85, English cyclist, heart attack
- Franco Zeffirelli, 96, Italian film and stage director (Romeo and Juliet, Jesus of Nazareth, The Taming of the Shrew) and Senator (1994–2001).
- Joseph Zammit, 86, Australian Olympic wrestler (1956).

=== 16 ===
- Frederick Andermann, 88, Ukrainian-born Canadian neurologist and epileptologist.
- Richard A. Andersen, 76, American chemist.
- Alan Brinkley, 70, American historian, complications from frontotemporal dementia.
- Bishop Bullwinkle, 70, American singer ("Hell to the Naw Naw") and comedian, heart attack.
- Ella Chafee, 74, American Paralympic wheelchair basketball player and fencer, liver aneurysm.
- John Charles, 75, American football player (Boston Patriots, Minnesota Vikings, Houston Oilers).
- Kelly Coleman, 80, American basketball player (Harlem Globetrotters, Chicago Majors, Baltimore Bullets).
- Wolfgang Danne, 77, German figure skater, Olympic bronze medalist (1968).
- Paulino do Livramento Évora, 87, Cape Verdean Roman Catholic prelate, Bishop of Santiago de Cabo Verde (1975–2009).
- Feng Chuanhan, 105, Chinese orthopaedic surgeon, Vice President of Beijing Medical College (1980–1985).
- Elmer G. Gilbert, 89, American aerospace engineer, heart failure.
- Charles Ginnever, 87, American sculptor.
- Erzsébet Gulyás-Köteles, 94, Hungarian gymnast, Olympic silver medallist (1948, 1952) and champion (1956).
- Frank LaMere, 69, American Winnebago activist, bile duct cancer.
- Adam Litovitz, 36, Canadian musician and composer (Year of the Carnivore, Octavio Is Dead!).
- Steve Maaranen, 72, American Olympic cyclist (1968).
- Brenda Maddox, 87, American journalist and biographer.
- Simona Mafai De Pasquale, 90, Italian politician, Senator (1976–1979), stroke.
- Rolf Magnusson, 97, Swedish Olympic fencer.
- Molly O'Neill, 66, American food writer.
- Suzan Pitt, 75, American animator and painter, cancer.
- Francine Shapiro, 71, American psychologist, developer of eye movement desensitization and reprocessing.
- Monte Shelton, 85, American racing driver (Can-Am, Trans-Am), pancreatic cancer.
- Charles Wyrsch, 98, Swiss painter.

=== 17 ===
- Knut Andersen, 88, Norwegian film director (Scorched Earth).
- Andrew Anderson, 74, American basketball player.
- Graham Barnett, 83, English footballer (Port Vale, Halifax Town).
- Filipp Bobkov, 93, Russian intelligence officer (KGB).
- Michael Branch, 79, British linguist and academic administrator.
- Kiril Cenevski, 76, Macedonian film director (Black Seed).
- Jerome Ch'en, 99, Chinese-Canadian historian.
- Shlomi Eyal, 59, Israeli Olympic fencer (1984).
- Moacyr Grechi, 83, Brazilian Roman Catholic prelate, Archbishop of Porto Velho (1998–2011).
- Friederike de Haas, 74, German politician, member of the Landtag of Saxony (1990–2009).
- Darwin Hindman, 86, American politician, mayor of Columbia, Missouri (1995–2010), lung disease.
- Huang Wenxiu, 30, Chinese politician, party secretary of Baini village in Guangxi, China (2018–2019), drowned.
- Jean-Marie Hullot, 65, French computer scientist and programmer (Apple Inc.).
- Somchai Khunpluem, 81, Thai mobster and politician, colon cancer.
- Kung Hsiang-fu, 76, Chinese molecular biologist and virologist, member of the Academy of Sciences.
- Yehuda Levi, 93, American-Israeli rabbi and writer.
- Eric Lindroth, 67, American Olympic water polo player.
- Ian MacFarlane, 86, Scottish football player (Aberdeen, Chelsea) and manager (Carlisle United).
- Mohamed Morsi, 67, Egyptian politician, President (2012–2013), heart attack.
- Pierre Pardoën, 88, French racing cyclist.
- Sascha Pohflepp, 41, German artist.
- Clemens C. J. Roothaan, 100, Dutch chemist and physicist, developer of Roothaan equations.
- Salvatore Senese, 84, Italian magistrate and politician, Deputy (1992–1994) and Senator (1994–2001).
- David Steele, 85, British historian.
- Robert Therrien, 71, American sculptor.
- Gloria Vanderbilt, 95, American socialite, artist and fashion designer, stomach cancer.
- Remo Vigni, 80, Italian footballer (Brescia, Monza, Padova).
- Henk Vonk, 77, Dutch football player (DOS) and coach.
- Christian Wägli, 84, Swiss Olympic sprinter (1960).

=== 18 ===
- Stephen Blaire, 77, American Roman Catholic prelate, Bishop of Stockton (1999–2018).
- Pavel Chihaia, 97, Romanian novelist and political dissident.
- Irene Coates, 94, English author.
- Bill Deacon, 75, New Zealand rugby league player (Waikato, national team).
- Tom Dillon, 93, Irish Gaelic footballer (Galway, Ahascragh).
- François Doubin, 86, French politician, mayor of Argentan (1989–2001).
- Leah Gaskin Fitchue, 78, American theologian and academic.
- Donald E. Hines, 85, American politician, member (1993–2008) and President of the Louisiana State Senate (2004–2008).
- Alf Hughes, 88, Australian VFL footballer (Hawthorn).
- Norm Ledgin, 90, American writer and journalist, degenerative lung disease.
- Shona Dunlop MacTavish, 99, New Zealand dancer and choreographer.
- Obedingwa Mguni, 56, Zimbabwean politician, MP (since 2013).
- Gyp Mills, 72, English sculptor and songwriter.
- Warren Niesłuchowski, 72, German-born Polish-American nomadic lifestyle artist and writer.
- Molara Ogundipe, 78, Nigerian writer and women's rights activist.
- Milton Quon, 105, American animator (Fantasia, Dumbo) and actor (Speed).
- Maria Giuseppa Robucci, 116, Italian supercentenarian, Europe's oldest person.
- Patrick Smith, 55, American kickboxer and mixed martial artist, urothelial bladder cancer.
- Gerry Spiess, 79, American sailor.
- Vladimir Stoyanov, 54, Bulgarian footballer (Chernomorets Burgas, Lokomotiv Sofia, national team).
- Willem van Eijk, 77, Dutch convicted serial killer.
- Mladen Vranic, 89, Croatian Canadian Scientist and Medical Researcher, congestive heart failure.

=== 19 ===
- Desmond Amofah, 29, American internet personality (Etika), suicide by drowning.
- Christine Barnetson, 71, Australian Olympic swimmer (1964).
- Filipe Bole, 82, Fijian politician, Minister for Foreign Affairs (1987–1988, 1992–1994, 1994–1997) and Deputy Prime Minister (1993).
- Bobby Brown, 87, Scottish footballer (Workington).
- D. K. Chowta, 81, Indian writer and artist.
- Ernie Collumbine, 80, Scottish footballer (Clydebank, St Johnstone, East Stirlingshire, Stenhousemuir F.C.).
- Peter Allan Fields, 84, American television writer (Star Trek, The Six Million Dollar Man, The Man from U.N.C.L.E.).
- Pedrinho Gaúcho, 65, Brazilian Olympic footballer (national team), pneumonia.
- Philip Geier, 84, American businessman, CEO of The Interpublic Group of Companies (1980–2000).
- Elemér Gergátz, 77, Hungarian politician and veterinarian, Minister of Agriculture (1991–1993).
- Meryl Getline, 65, American pilot and author, cancer.
- Anthony Hedges, 88, English composer.
- Lionheart, 36, British professional wrestler (ICW).
- David Matthews, 82, English rugby union player (Leicester Tigers).
- Angelika Mertens, 66, German politician, member of the Bundestag (1994–2005) and chairwoman of ASB (since 2005).
- Peng Xiaolian, 65, Chinese film director (Once Upon a Time in Shanghai, Shanghai Story, Shanghai Rumba).
- Jack Renner, 84, American recording engineer (Telarc International Corporation).
- Ibrahim Saber, 74, Bangladeshi field hockey player (national team).
- Rafael de la Sierra, 70, Spanish politician, President of the Parliament of Cantabria (1999–2003) and Minister of the Presidency and Justice of Cantabria (2015–2019).
- Dennis Silk, 87, English cricketer (Cambridge University, Somerset), and chairman of the Test and County Cricket Board (1994–1996).
- Norman Stone, 78, Scottish historian and author.
- Su Huiyu, 84, Chinese legal scholar.
- Dmytro Tymchuk, 46, Ukrainian politician, military expert and blogger, member of the Verkhovna Rada (since 2014), shot.
- Ioannis Veryvakis, 88, Greek Army officer.
- Dennis White, 70, English footballer (Hartlepool).
- Leonid Zamyatin, 97, Russian diplomat, Ambassador to the UK (1986–1991), Director General of TASS (1970–1978).

=== 20 ===
- G. Ray Arnett, 95, American conservationist and government official.
- Wibke Bruhns, 80, German journalist.
- Bill Collins, 84, Australian film historian, critic and television host (ABC, Network Ten, Fox Classics).
- Emanuele Crestini, 46, Italian politician, Mayor of Rocca di Papa (since 2016), complications of burns and smoke inhalation.
- Anders Faager, 74, Swedish Olympic sprinter, European indoor champion (1974).
- Dumitru Focșeneanu, 83, Romanian Olympic bobsledder (1972), stroke.
- Eddie Garcia, 90, Filipino actor (Beast of the Yellow Night, Rainbow's Sunset, Ang Probinsyano), director and television personality, complications from a fall.
- Judy Jacobson, 80, American politician, member of the Montana Senate (1981–1996).
- Gunther Kress, 78, Austrian-born British semiotician, heart failure.
- Peter Matić, 82, Austrian actor (I Learned It from Father, Everyone Dies Alone, Wahnfried).
- Gerald Messlender, 57, Austrian footballer (Admira Wacker Wien, national team).
- Colin A. Palmer, 75, Jamaican historian.
- Gino Pasqualotto, 63, Italian Olympic ice hockey player (1984), cancer.
- Jimmy Reardon, 93, Irish Olympic sprinter (1948).
- Toufiq M. Seraj, 63, Bangladeshi businessman, President of the Real Estate and Housing Association (2000–2006), heart attack.
- Rubén Suñé, 72, Argentine footballer (Boca Juniors, Huracán, national team).
- Mark Warawa, 69, Canadian politician, MP (since 2004), pancreatic cancer.
- Noel White, 95, Australian rugby league player (national team).
- Marion Wilson, 42, American convicted murderer, executed by lethal injection.

=== 21 ===
- Peter Ball, 87, English Anglican cleric and convicted sex offender, Bishop of Lewes (1977–1992) and Gloucester (1992–1993).
- Susan Bernard, 71, American actress (Faster, Pussycat! Kill! Kill!) and model (Playboy), heart attack.
- Ralph Brill, 83, American legal scholar.
- Demetris Christofias, 72, Cypriot politician, President (2008–2013), respiratory failure.
- Lindsay Drake, 69, Australian rugby league player (Manly Warringah, St. George).
- Oleksandr Filiayev, 84, Ukrainian footballer (SKA Lviv, Karpaty Lviv).
- Robert Friend, 99, American air force officer.
- Bubba Green, 61, American football player (Baltimore Colts), cancer.
- Geraldine Harcourt, 67, New Zealand Japanese-English translator.
- Jane Hubert, 84, British anthropologist.
- Richard N. Levy, 82, American rabbi.
- Eugene V. Lux, 92, American politician.
- Jan Meyers, 90, American politician, member of the U.S. House of Representatives (1985–1997).
- Karen Petch, 50, British television presenter, breast cancer.
- Avelino Muñoz Stevenson, 62, Puerto Rican television sportscaster, complications from pulmonary emphysema.
- Elliot Roberts, 76, American music executive (Asylum Records) and manager (Neil Young, Joni Mitchell).
- Peter Selz, 100, German-born American art historian.
- William Simons, 78, Welsh actor (No Place for Jennifer, Where No Vultures Fly, Heartbeat).
- Joseph C. Strasser, 79, American rear admiral.
- Jim Taricani, 69, American investigative journalist (WJAR), kidney failure.
- John Vernon, 89, Australian Olympic high jumper.
- Paul Winner, 83, English public relations executive.
- Peter Winterburn, 57, Canadian geochemist, stabbed.
- Harriet Sohmers Zwerling, 91, American writer and artist's model.

=== 22 ===
- Arild Berg, 43, Norwegian footballer (Bodø/Glimt), suicide.
- Jerry Carrigan, 75, American rock drummer (Elvis Presley, John Denver, Muscle Shoals Rhythm Section).
- Vince Costello, 87, American football player (Cleveland Browns).
- Irwin Dorros, 89, American telecommunications executive and engineer.
- Miguel Ángel Falasca, 46, Argentine-born Spanish Olympic volleyball player (Pòrtol, Skra Bełchatów, national team) and coach, heart attack.
- Pierre Fortier, 86, Canadian politician.
- Rolf Knight, 83, Canadian historian and author.
- Willy Komen, 77, Kenyan politician, MP (1969–1974, 1975–1979, 1992–2002).
- Judith Krantz, 91, American author (Scruples, Princess Daisy, Till We Meet Again).
- Leevi Lehto, 68, Finnish poet, translator and programmer, multiple system atrophy.
- Robert V. Levine, 73, American psychologist.
- Ambachew Mekonnen, Ethiopian politician, President of Amhara Region (since 2019), shot.
- Se'are Mekonnen, Ethiopian army officer, Chief of General Staff (since 2018), shot.
- Concepción Paredes, 48, Spanish Olympic triple jumper (1996).
- Thanjavur R. Ramamoorthy, 90, Indian musician.
- Zdeněk Remsa, 90, Czech Olympic ski jumper (1948) and ski jumping coach.
- Stepan Shakaryan, 84, Azerbaijani-born Armenian composer.
- John Shearer, 72, American photojournalist.
- Thalles, 24, Brazilian football player (Vasco da Gama, Ponte Preta, U20 national team), traffic collision.
- Geoffrey Tordoff, Baron Tordoff, 90, British businessman and politician, Member of the House of Lords (1981–2016) and President of the Liberal Party (1983–1984).
- Tõnis Vint, 77, Estonian graphic artist.
- Jolene Watanabe, 50, American tennis player, appendix cancer.

=== 23 ===
- Dave Bartholomew, 100, American Hall of Fame musician, bandleader and songwriter ("Ain't That a Shame", "I Hear You Knocking", "I'm Walkin'"), heart failure.
- Marv Bevan, 83, Canadian football player (Ottawa Rough Riders).
- William F. Brown, 91, American playwright (The Wiz).
- Don Colo, 94, American football player (Cleveland Browns).
- Randall Dipert, 68, American philosopher.
- Charles E. Flyte, 85, American politician.
- Andrey Kharitonov, 59, Russian actor (The Gadfly, The Invisible Man, The Life of Klim Samgin), stomach cancer.
- Manus Kelly, 41, Irish rally driver, race collision.
- John Kobelke, 69, Australian politician, member of the Western Australian Legislative Assembly (1989–2013).
- Helga Lie, 88, Norwegian politician.
- Spiro Malas, 86, American bass-baritone opera singer.
- Kerry Marbury, 67, American football player (Toronto Argonauts, Ottawa Rough Riders).
- Stephanie Niznik, 52, American actress (Everwood, Star Trek: Insurrection, Life Is Wild).
- Naomi Quinn, 79, American academic.
- Fernando Roldán, 97, Chilean footballer (CD Universidad Católica, national team).
- George Rosenkranz, 102, Hungarian-born Mexican chemist.
- Jack Rudolph, 82, American football player (Boston Patriots).
- Abdul Sattar, 88, Pakistani political scientist and diplomat, Minister of Foreign Affairs (1993, 1999–2002).
- Steve Sipek, 77, Croatian-born American actor.
- George Strickland, 76, Australian politician, Speaker of the Western Australian Legislative Assembly (1997–2001).
- Žarko Varajić, 67, Serbian basketball player (Bosna, Yugoslavia national team) and executive, Olympic silver medallist (1976).

=== 24 ===
- Harry Archer, 86, English rugby player (Workington RFC, Workington Town).
- Janet Arnott, 63, Canadian curler, world champion (1984), cancer
- Jeff Austin, 45, American mandolinist and singer (Yonder Mountain String Band).
- Peter Bridgmont, 90, English actor (The Mousetrap).
- Billy Drago, 73, American actor (The Untouchables, The Adventures of Brisco County, Jr., Pale Rider), complications from a stroke.
- Steve Dunleavy, 81, Australian journalist (New York Post).
- Iván Erőd, 83, Hungarian-Austrian composer and pianist.
- Jonás Gómez Gallo, 95, Chilean businessman and politician, Senator (1961–1969) and Deputy (1957–1961).
- Min Hogg, 80, British journalist and interior designer.
- José Huerta, 71, Peruvian politician, Minister of Defense (since 2018), heart attack.
- Yekaterina Mikhailova-Demina, 93, Russian military doctor.
- Al Ogletree, 89, American college baseball coach (Dallas, Sul Ross State, UTRGV Vaqueros).
- Madan Lal Saini, 75, Indian politician, member of the Rajya Sabha (since 2018) and Rajasthan Legislative Assembly (1990–1992).
- Jörg Stübner, 53, German footballer (Dynamo Dresden, Sachsen Leipzig, East Germany national team).
- Brigitte Swoboda, 76, Austrian actress.
- Asaminew Tsige, Ethiopian general, suspected plotter of the Amhara Region coup d'état attempt, shot.
- Wu Guoqing, 82, Chinese police detective and forensic scientist.

=== 25 ===
- Mack Atkins, 87, Australian footballer (Hawthorn).
- Tony Barone, 72, American basketball coach (Creighton Bluejays, Texas A&M Aggies, Memphis Grizzlies).
- Ken Behring, 91, American real estate developer, philanthropist and football franchise owner (Seattle Seahawks).
- Arthur Candy, 85, New Zealand Olympic cyclist (1964).
- John Dillon, 76, Irish hurler (Roscrea, Tipperary).
- Russ Ewing, 95, American journalist (WLS-TV, WMAQ-TV), bladder cancer.
- Giuseppe Fabiani, 92, Italian Roman Catholic prelate, Bishop of Imola (1989–2002).
- Ulla Juurola, 77, Finnish politician.
- JacSue Kehoe, 83, American neuroscientist.
- Bruno de Keyzer, 69, French cinematographer (Little Dorrit).
- Li Lun, 91, Chinese lieutenant general, Deputy Director of the PLA General Logistics Department.
- Alfie Linehan, 79, Irish cricketer.
- Bryan Marshall, 81, British actor (The Spy Who Loved Me, Quatermass and the Pit, The Long Good Friday).
- Kevin McKenna, 75, Irish republican, chief of staff of the Provisional Irish Republican Army (1983–1997).
- Astrid North, 45, German soul singer, pancreatic cancer.
- Ivan Prpić, 91, Croatian physician.
- Mohan Ranade, 88, Indian freedom fighter.
- Isabel Sarli, 89, Argentine actress (Thunder Among the Leaves) and glamour model, Miss Argentina (1955).
- Swami Satyamitranand, 86, Indian Hindu spiritual teacher, lung disease.
- Roderick Slater, 82, American artist.
- Ringaudas Songaila, 90, Lithuanian politician, First Secretary of the Communist Party of Lithuania (1987–1988).
- M. Elaine Toms, 102, American physicist.
- Eerik-Juhan Truuväli, 81, Estonian lawyer and professor, Chancellor of Justice (1993–2000).
- Ray Wheeler, 91, British engineer.
- Eurig Wyn, 74, Welsh journalist (BBC) and politician, MEP (1999–2004).
- Xu Zhongyu, 104, Chinese writer and literary scholar.

=== 26 ===
- Ben Barenholtz, 83, Ukrainian-born American film producer (Miller's Crossing, Barton Fink, Requiem for a Dream).
- Fletcher Benton, 88, American artist.
- Georges Brossard, 79, Canadian entomologist, founder of the Montreal Insectarium, lung cancer.
- Carlito Joaquin Cenzon, 80, Filipino Roman Catholic prelate, Bishop of Baguio (2002–2016).
- Beth Chapman, 51, American bounty hunter and reality television personality (Dog the Bounty Hunter, Dog and Beth: On the Hunt, Dog's Most Wanted), throat cancer.
- Charalambos Cholidis, 62, Greek Greco-Roman wrestler, Olympic bronze medalist (1984, 1988), heart attack.
- Ivan Cooper, 75, Northern Irish politician, MP (1969–1974), co-founder of the SDLP.
- Alex Cosmidis, 90, American baseball scout, player and manager.
- Julian Crampton, 66, British biologist and academic.
- Douglas Fielding, 73, British actor (Z-Cars, EastEnders) and narrator (Nightfall in Middle-Earth).
- Giovanni Furlani, 82, Italian Olympic ice hockey player.
- Tony Hall, 91, British music industry executive, columnist and presenter.
- Ian Johnson, 70, Australian television executive (Nine Network, Seven Network).
- Anne Johnston, 86, Canadian politician, Toronto City Councillor (1972–1985, 1998–2003).
- Gilberte Marin-Moskovitz, 82, French politician.
- Gerald McCann, 87, British fashion designer.
- Gene Pingatore, 82, American basketball coach (St. Joseph High School).
- Manuel Real, 95, American senior (former chief) judge, member of the U.S. District Court for Central California.
- Morteza Saffari Natanzi, 63, Iranian politician, MP (since 2016), pancreatic cancer.
- David Pentreath, 86, British Royal Navy officer.
- Andrey Sakharov, 89, Russian historian.
- Édith Scob, 81, French actress (Eyes Without a Face, Summer Hours, Holy Motors).
- Loredana Simioli, 41, Italian actress (L'amore buio, Gorbaciof, Perez.), cancer.
- Emily Stonington, 72, American politician from Montana.
- Tadao Takashima, 88, Japanese actor (Atragon, Frankenstein Conquers the World, Son of Godzilla).
- Max Wright, 75, American actor (ALF, Reds, All That Jazz), lymphoma.

=== 27 ===
- Gualberto Castro, 84, Mexican singer (Los Hermanos Castro) and television personality (La Carabina de Ambrosio), complications from bladder cancer.
- Stephan Chase, 74, British actor (Maleficent, Wives and Daughters, Macbeth).
- Jharna Dhara Chowdhury, 80, Bangladeshi social activist, cerebral haemorrhage.
- Priscilla Cohn, 85, American philosopher and animal rights activist, complications from Parkinson's disease.
- Don Frerichs, 88, American politician, member of the Minnesota House of Representatives (1981–1997).
- David Golomb, 86, Israeli politician, member of the Knesset (1968–1969, 1977–1981).
- Margaret Ann Jones, 81, American philanthropist and businesswoman.
- Claude Kohler, 87, American Olympic sailor (1960).
- Brian Lennard, 84, British executive.
- Vukica Mitić, 65, Serbian Olympic basketball player (1980).
- Shyam Mitra, 82, Indian cricketer (Bengal), liver disease.
- Irene Molyneux, 96, English lawn bowler.
- Max Muscle, 56, American professional wrestler (WCW).
- Hartmut Nickel, 74, German Olympic ice hockey player (1968).
- Vijaya Nirmala, 73, Indian film director (Bezawada Bebbuli) and actress (Bhargavi Nilayam, Rangula Ratnam), heart attack.
- Kaj Pindal, 91, Danish-born Canadian animator (What on Earth!, Peep and the Big Wide World).
- Justin Raimondo, 67, American author, co-founder and editorial director of Antiwar.com, lung cancer.
- Svanhild Salberg, 86, Norwegian politician.
- Jānis Skredelis, 79, Latvian football manager (Daugava Riga).
- Wallace Stickney, 84, American civil servant, Director of FEMA (1990–1993).
- Louis Thiry, 84, French organist and composer.
- Tong Daoming, 82, Chinese literary scholar, translator, and playwright.
- Peter Westergaard, 88, American composer and music theorist.
- Yu Pufan, 96, Chinese computer pioneer.

=== 28 ===
- Liaquat Ali Asim, 67, Pakistani poet, heart attack.
- Paul Benjamin, 81, American actor (Do the Right Thing, Midnight Cowboy, Born to Win).
- Şükrü Birand, 75, Turkish footballer (PTT Ankara, Fenerbahçe), complications from a heart attack.
- Abburi Chayadevi, 85, Indian fiction writer.
- Jean-Louis Chrétien, 66, French philosopher.
- František Čuba, 83, Czech agronomist and politician, Senator (2014–2018), Medal of Merit recipient.
- Borislav Džaković, 71, Serbian-Bosnian basketball coach (Partizan, Sloboda Tuzla).
- Judith Poxson Fawkes, 77, American tapestry weaver.
- Willie Frazer, 58, Northern Irish loyalist activist and victims advocate, cancer.
- Mário Jorge da Fonseca Hermes, 92, Brazilian Olympic basketball player (1952).
- Charles Levin, 70, American actor (Alice, Hill Street Blues, Capital News), fall.
- Lisa Martinek, 47, German actress (Blankenese, The Old Fox, Der Kriminalist), swimming accident.
- Delceita Oakley, 75, Panamanian Olympic sprinter (1964).
- Brian Rhodes, 68, Australian cricketer (New South Wales).
- Andy Selfridge, 70, American football player (New York Giants, Buffalo Bills, Miami Dolphins).
- Tony Sutton, 98, English cricketer (Oxford University, Somerset).
- Lewis Thom, 75, Scottish footballer (Aberdeen, Lincoln City, Elgin City).
- Shizuteru Ueda, 93, Japanese philosopher, pneumonia.

=== 29 ===
- Margie Ackles, 80, American figure skater.
- Rafael Acosta Arévalo, 50, Venezuelan military officer.
- Jaya Arunachalam, 84, Indian social worker.
- David Brink, 71, American Olympic cyclist (1968).
- Sir Simon Dawbarn, 95, British diplomat.
- Yevheniya Dembska, 98, Ukrainian actress (White Acacia).
- Gary Duncan, 72, American rock guitarist (Quicksilver Messenger Service), complications from a seizure.
- Dieter Enders, 73, German chemist.
- Stewart Greene, 91, American advertising executive, cardiac arrest caused by lung cancer.
- Florijana Ismaili, 24, Swiss footballer (BSC YB Frauen, national team), acute asphyxia.
- Jeon Mi-seon, 48, South Korean actress (Moon Embracing the Sun, Hide and Seek, Love Is a Crazy Thing), suicide by hanging.
- Jiang Chongjing, 103, Chinese politician and academic administrator, President of the NPU and CQUT, Vice Minister of the Fourth Ministry of Machine Building (1978–1982).
- Tom Jordan, 82, Irish actor (Fair City).
- Ireneusz Kluczek, 79, Polish Olympic sprinter.
- Jesper Langberg, 78, Danish actor (It's Nifty in the Navy, Me and My Kid Brother, Olsen-banden Junior).
- Sir David Maddison, 72, English judge.
- Dickson Makwaza, 76, Zambian football player and coach.
- Guillermo Mordillo, 86, Argentine cartoonist.
- Babu Narayanan, 59, Indian film director (Sthreedhanam, To Noora with Love), cancer.
- Ilkka Nummisto, 75, Finnish Olympic sprint canoer (1964, 1968, 1972, 1976).
- Gunilla Pontén, 90, Swedish fashion designer.
- Santosh Rana, 76, Indian writer and politician, MLA (1977–1982), cancer.
- Jim Reed, 93, American racing driver.
- Jim Roberts, 97, English architect (Rotunda).
- Whitney North Seymour Jr., 95, American politician and U.S. Attorney for the Southern District of New York (1970–1973), member of the New York State Senate (1966–1968).
- Rakesh Shukla, 71, Indian cricketer.
- Kirsti Simonsuuri, 73, Finnish writer and poet, complications from cancer and Parkinson's disease.
- Sun Zhongliang, 82, Chinese electrical engineer, academician of the Chinese Academy of Engineering.
- Sir Kenneth Warren, 92, British politician, MP for Hastings (1970–1983) and Hastings and Rye (1983–1992).

=== 30 ===
- Sebastián Alarcón, 70, Chilean film director and screenwriter (Night Over Chile), cancer.
- David Binder, 88, American journalist (The New York Times), kidney disease.
- Amadou Boiro, 23, Senegalese footballer (Gimnàstic de Tarragona).
- Momir Bulatović, 62, Montenegrin politician, President of the Republic of Montenegro (1990–1998) and Prime Minister of the Federal Republic of Yugoslavia (1998–2000), heart attack.
- Helmut Diefenthal, 95, German-born American radiologist.
- Audrey Eyton, 83, English animal welfare campaigner and journalist.
- Mitchell Feigenbaum, 74, American physicist, discoverer of Feigenbaum constants.
- Doug Ford, 90, Australian cricketer (New South Wales).
- Boris Gamaleya, 88, French poet, linguist and social activist.
- Giovanni Giavazzi, 99, Italian politician, MEP (1979–1989).
- James Gill, 91, New Zealand cricketer (Otago).
- Glyn Houston, 93, Welsh actor (Doctor Who, The Sea Wolves).
- David Koloane, 81, South African artist.
- Luis Mercedes, 51, Dominican baseball player (Baltimore Orioles, San Francisco Giants), complications from diabetes.
- Alexander Mitterhuber, 89, Austrian-born Canadian Olympic rower (1952).
- Borka Pavićević, 72, Serbian dramaturge and newspaper columnist.
- John Rafferty, 65, Canadian politician, MP (2008–2015), cancer.
- Armando Salas, 73, Spanish cartoonist.
- Anne Vanderlove, 80, Dutch-born French singer-songwriter.
- George Veronis, 93, American geophysicist.
- Noel White, 89, British businessman and football club chairman (Liverpool).
- Óscar Zolezzi, 94, Argentine Olympic rower (1948).
