= Gamaleya =

Gamaleya may refer to:

== People ==
- Boris Gamaleya (1930–2019), Réunion poet, literary critic, linguist, folklorist, and social activist
- Nikolay Gamaleya (1859–1949), Russian and Soviet microbiologist and vaccine researcher
- Platon Yakovlevich Gamaleya (1766–1817), Russian Empire naval officer and navigator

== Places ==
- Gamaleya Rock, rock formation in Antarctica named after Platon Yakovlevich Gamaleya

== Organisations ==
- Gamaleya Research Institute of Epidemiology and Microbiology, named after Nikolay Gamaleya
