= Sedar =

Sedar may refer to:

- System for Electronic Document Analysis and Retrieval (SEDAR), Canadian document filing system for companies
- Dick Sedar (1931–2019), American politician
- Ed Sedar (born 1961), American baseball player

== See also ==
- Seder (disambiguation), associated with several Jewish holidays
