= Karen Johnson =

Karen Johnson may refer to:

- Karen Johnson (producer), American television soap opera director, producer, writer, and editor
- Karen Johnson (violinist), American violinist
- Karen Johnson (Arizona politician), Arizona politician
- Karen Johnson (Florida politician)
- Karen Johnson (sailor) (born 1962), Canadian Olympic sailor
- Karen C. Johnson (born 1955), research professor in Medicine, University of Tennessee Health Science Center
- Karen B. Johnson (1942–2019), mayor of Schenectady, New York
- Karen Johnson (scientist), British geologist

== See also ==
- Karen Johnston, American singer-songwriter better known as Michelle Shocked
