= Gateway High School =

Gateway High School may refer to:

== United States ==
- Gateway High School (San Francisco), San Francisco, California
- Gateway High School (Colorado), Aurora, Colorado
- Gateway High School (Florida), Kissimmee, Florida
- Gateway High School (Pennsylvania), Monroeville, Pennsylvania
- Gateway STEM High School, St. Louis, Missouri
- Gateway Regional High School (Massachusetts), Huntington, Massachusetts
- Gateway Regional High School (New Jersey), Woodbury Heights, New Jersey

== Zimbabwe ==
- Gateway High School (Zimbabwe), Harare
