= Ray Rigby =

Ray Rigby may refer to:

- Ray Rigby (politician) (1923–2019), American politician
- Ray Rigby (weightlifter) (1949–1998), Australian weightlifter and shot putter
- Ray Rigby (screenwriter) (1916–1995), British screenwriter
