= Mambele (disambiguation) =

Mambele is a form of hybrid knife/axe used in central and southern Africa.

A Mambele may also refer to:

- Pierre Mambele (1945–2019), Congolese taxi driver known for his ability to find contacts for journalists
