= Karen C. Johnson =

American physician

- Born: Karen Lynn Chandler; Memphis, Tennessee
- Other name: Karen Chandler Johnson
- Education: Lambuth University; University of Tennessee Health Science Center; Johns Hopkins University
- Occupations: Physician, Preventative Health Researcher, Professor
- Years active: 1990-present
- Employer: University of Tennessee Health Science Center
- Known for: Biology research

Karen C. Johnson is the chair for the Department of Preventive Medicine at the University of Tennessee Health Science Center (UTHSC). She has been involved in at least five clinical world trials, including a Women's health initiative, the SPRINT Trial, the Look AHEAD (Action for Health in Diabetes) Study, the TARGIT Study and the D2d Trial. She has been noted by Thomson Reuters as one of the world's most-cited scientists.

== Biography ==
Karen Lynn Chandler was born in Memphis, Tennessee to Colie Edward and Cecilia Chandler. She grew up in Memphis and attended the Memphis Preparatory School. She continued her education earning an undergraduate degree at Lambuth University in 1978. She went on to earn her MD distinction at the University of Tennessee in 1985 and a Master of Public Health from Johns Hopkins University after her marriage. In 1990, she returned to her alma mater and joined the faculty of the UTHSC where she has been working since. She has two children, Caitlin Johnson and Justin Johnson.

== Research ==
Johnson has been a significant contributor to the university's research funding drives, bringing in $40 million toward five research projects.

=== Women's Health Initiative ===
One of the projects, a Women's Health Initiative, began in 1993 and is evaluating diseases that effect women. The clinical trial involves more than 160,000 women. One of their findings was that women who consume two or more diet soft drinks each day face higher risks of heart problems than women who either don't drink soft drinks at all or drink them rarely.

=== SPRINT trial ===
Another of her trials was the Systolic Blood Pressure Intervention Trial (SPRINT), which concluded in 2015. Its findings were that intervention could have a major impact on reducing blood pressure levels.

=== Look AHEAD Study ===
Johnson is also the lead researcher on the Look AHEAD Study of the National Institute of Diabetes and Digestive and Kidney Diseases, which started in 2001. It is evaluating whether people with type 2 diabetes can prevent heart attacks and other cardiovascular problems through weight loss and increased levels of physical activity. The study was stopped in 2012, as preliminary indications of the 5,000 test subjects did not show positive changes from lifestyle intervention at the expected rates. However, modifications in the program allowed it to be continued in 2014.

=== TARGIT ===
In 2012, Johnson launched a clinic trial called TARGIT (Treating Adults at Risk for Weight Gain with Interactive Technology) funded by the National Institutes of Health. The program is designed to use iPod applications to support smoking cessation while eliminating weight-gain. The study concluded in 2017. It found that "Providing an intensive weight gain prevention program combined with a smoking cessation program via interactive technology was not associated with greater long‐term weight gain prevention".

=== D2d Trial ===
In 2014, she began working on the D2d Trial (vitamin D and type 2 diabetes) which is aimed at determining if vitamin D intake lowers the risk of type 2 diabetes. The study concluded in 2020 and did not find any significant results connecting vitamin D intake and the risk of developing type 2 diabetes.

== The Quit Forever app ==
In 2011, the UTHSC released an iPhone app that is meant to help people quit smoking. The app includes methods and instructions to help people stop smoking for life. According to Johnson "The app is our way of translating what we know works to promote health into social media and technology trends of today". The goal of the app is to reach large numbers of people who want to quit smoking. The app also includes information about the effects of both first and second hand smoke on people's health.

== Work experience ==
Johnson started working for UTHSC in 1990. From 2010 to 2014, Johnson served as the interim chair of the Department of Preventive Medicine at UTHSC. Johnson has been cited by Thomson Reuters as one of the most influential scientific publishers in the world. In 2019, she became the new chair for the Department of Preventive Medicine at the University of Tennessee Health Science Center.

== Awards ==
In 2014, she was awarded the Kathryn Sullivan Bowld Endowment Fund Professorship in Women's Health from the College of Medicine at UTHSC. She received this due to her "excellence in research, her national reputation and her history as a strong collaborator".
