= Shawn Spikes =

American thoroughbred jockey (1996–2019)

Shawn Spikes Jr.
Personal information
- Born: March 15, 1996 San Francisco, California, US
- Died: June 11, 2019 (aged 23) Lake Del Valle, California, US
- Occupation: Jockey

Horse racing career
- Sport: Horse racing
- Career wins: 3

Significant horses
- Game Seeker (1st Win)

Shawn Spikes Jr. (March 15, 1996 – June 11, 2019) was a professional American thoroughbred jockey. At Golden Gate Fields, Spikes had a total of 141 starts and 3 career wins. Spikes also won a number of horse races in the California State Fair county horse racing circuit.

== Career ==
Three years after graduating high school, on March 13, 2016, Sean Spikes won his first thoroughbred race, riding the horse 'Game Seeker' in Race 1 at Golden Gate Fields.

== Education ==
Sean Spikes attended Gateway High School in San Francisco, California, and graduated in 2013.

== Disappearance and death ==
On Tuesday, June 11, 2019, Spikes was boating with friends at Lake Del Valle in unincorporated Alameda County, south of Livermore. Authorities later said it was not clear if Spikes fell, or jumped into the water. It was also not immediately clear if Spikes knew how to swim, or wore a life jacket. East Bay Regional Park District police and firefighters responded to the scene and were joined by the Alameda County Fire Department and Sheriff's Department divers to conduct a search, authorities said. Searchers used a helicopter and boats before calling off the search just after midnight. The search resumed later Wednesday morning, and Spikes’ body was found before noon in more than 40 feet of water, authorities said. Authorities said his relatives were at the lake when he was found.

== Legacy ==
Commemorating Spikes on September 22, 2021 - friend, a former Gateway High School classmate, and recording artist, Marcus Orelias dedicated his third self-titled album to Spikes in an Instagram post stating in the later of the message; "R.I.P. to my brother, Shawn Spikes. This next one [album] is for you."
