= Elizabeth Barrett-Connor =

American epidemiologist

- Cardiology Online video (fair use only)
- Born: Elizabeth Louise Barrett; April 8, 1935; Evanston, Illinois U.S.
- Died: June 10, 2019 (aged 84); La Jolla, California, U.S.
- Education: Mount Holyoke College; Cornell University
- Known for: Epidemiology
- Spouse: James Connor (m. 1965)
- Children: 3
- Scientific career
- Workplaces: University of Texas Southwestern Medical Center; University of California, San Diego

Elizabeth Louise Barrett-Connor (April 8, 1935 – June 10, 2019) was Chief of the Division of Epidemiology and Distinguished Professor at the University of California, San Diego. She investigated the role of hormones in pathogenesis of cardiovascular disease, diabetes and osteoporosis.

== Early life and education ==
Barrett-Connor was born in Evanston, Illinois. She was the only child of Florence Hershey and William Barrett. Her father was a chemical engineer, and working in ammunition companies. She grew up in Lee, Massachusetts, and learned to read with her grandmother, who was a postal worker. As a child she saw Leonard Bernstein in orchestra and attended the Northfield Preparatory School. Barrett-Connor studied zoology at Mount Holyoke College and was a member of Phi Beta Kappa. She graduated in 1956. In 1960 she earned her medical degree at Cornell University, before completing her internal medicine residency at the University of Texas Southwestern Medical Center. Her early work studied the diarrhea of United States students in Mexico. Barrett-Connor was a National Institutes of Health postdoctoral researcher at the London School of Hygiene & Tropical Medicine. She earned a diploma in the Clinical Medicine of the Tropics at the London School of Hygiene & Tropical Medicine in 1965. She moved to the University of Miami as an infectious disease epidemiologist.

== Research and career ==
Barrett-Connor specialised in healthy ageing and women's health. In particular, she championed studying cardiovascular disease in women as well as men. She was recruited to the faculty at the University of California, San Diego in 1972. In 1972 Barrett-Connor founded the Rancho Bernardo Heart and Chronic Disease Study (RBS), which involved over 6,000 people in Rancho Bernardo, San Diego. For the study, Barrett-Connor recruited people from Rancho Bernardo, and studied the connection between lipids and heart disease. She managed to recruit almost 70% of the Rancho Bernardo population. She selected the area as it was reported as having a healthy population. She has collected data for over forty years, including frozen blood samples, and transcends changes in lifestyle and cholesterol. She investigated how family history, fat distribution, cholesterol, physical activity and cigarette smoking impact chronic diseases. Barrett-Connor used the RBS to study sex differences in cardiovascular disease. As of 2011, one third of the participants still reported on their health, and half still have health tests at the Bernado Center Drive Clinic.

Barrett-Connor identified many aspects of women's health, including that women with diabetes have a high triglyceride and that diabetes eliminates women's protection against cardiovascular disease. It included innovative techniques to assess bone density, demonstrating that low calcium can result in hip fracture. She also showed that smoking during middle age can result in osteoporosis, and that drinking coffee can result in low bone mineral density.

Alongside RBS, Barrett-Connor led the Diabetes Prevention Program Outcomes Study. She was also interested in overlooked issues in men's health, including osteoporosis, and was involved with the Osteoporotic Fractures in Men Study and Testosterone Trials. In 1971 Barrett-Connor established the UCSD Epidemiology and Biostatistics Course.

Her approach to storing blood samples to investigate new hypotheses at a later date was adopted by the European Prospective Investigation into Cancer and Nutrition and the UK Biobank study.

=== Awards and honours ===
- 1986 American College of Preventive Medicine Boucot Sturgis Lecture
- 1987 American Diabetes Association Kelly West Memorial Lecture
- 1994 American College of Physicians James D. Bruce Memorial Award
- 1995 National Institutes of Health Florence Mahoney Lecture
- 1997 Society for Epidemiologic Research John C. Cassel Memorial Lecture
- 1998 American Epidemiological Society Harry S. Feldman Lecture
- 1999 National Institutes of Health Award for Outstanding Work
- 1999 London School of Hygiene & Tropical Medicine Heath Clark Lecture
- 2003 American Society for Preventive Cardiology Stokes Award
- 2003 Cornell University Medical College Alumni Association Award of Distinction
- 2003 Endocrine Society Clinical Investigator Award
- 2004 Awarded an honorary doctorate at the Norwegian University of Science and Technology (NTNU)
- 2009 National Osteoporosis Foundation Living Legacy Award
- 2009 American Heart Association Distinguished Scientist Award
- 2011 American Heart Association Population Research Prize
- 2012 Endocrine Society Mentoring Award
- 2013 International Academy of Cardiology Distinguished Fellowship Award
- 2013 Women in Epidemiology, Epidemiology and Prevention Mentoring Award
- 2018 Endocrine Society's Fred Conrad Koch Lifetime Achievement Award

The American Heart Association hold a series of Elizabeth Barrett-Connor research awards in her honour. She has previously served as the President of the American Public Health Association, the American Epidemiological Society, the American Heart Association Epidemiology Council and the Society for Epidemiologic Research.

== Personal life ==
Barrett-Connor was married to James Connor, a paediatrician at the University of California, San Diego. She had three children, Jonathan, Caroline and Steven as well as two-step children, James-Davis and Susan. Barrett-Connor died on June 10, 2019.
