= Irene Coates =

English playwright, poet, painter, feminist, and environmentalist (1925–2019)

Irene Coates (née Gregory; 23 March 1925 – 18 June 2019) was an English playwright, poet, painter, feminist and environmentalist. She is the author of 14 plays and four books, including Who's Afraid of Leonard Woolf?: A Case for the Sanity of Virginia Woolf.

== Biography ==
Irene Coates grew up in a Bohemian family in London. In the 1940s she ran the Cambridge Drama Centre. She wrote 14 plays between 1961 and 1981, which were produced among others by the Royal Shakespeare Company and performed at the Edinburgh Festival. She migrated to Australia in 1982 and was Writer in Residence (drama) at Nepean in 1998. She was the sister-in-law and aunt respectively of the painters Ivon Hitchens and John Hitchens.

== Works ==
=== Books ===
- Coates, Irene (1998). Who's Afraid of Leonard Woolf? A case for the sanity of Virginia Woolf. Rose Bay, New South Wales: Brandl & Shlesinger. ISBN 1876040122.

=== Plays ===
- The Wideawakes (1965)
- The Space is Mine
- Self Service

=== Films ===
- Irene Coates on Seeing
