= Jerry Gollub =

American physicist

- Born: Jerry Paul Gollub; September 9, 1944; St. Louis, Missouri, U.S.
- Died: June 8, 2019 (aged 74); Haverford, Pennsylvania, U.S.
- Education: Oberlin College; Harvard University
- Occupation: Physicist
- Spouse: Diane Nissen

Jerry Paul Gollub (September 9, 1944 – June 8, 2019) was an American physicist.

== Life and career ==
Gollub was born in St. Louis, Missouri. He attended Oberlin College, earning his AB degree in 1966. He also attended Harvard University, earning his PhD degree in 1971.

Gollub served as a professor in the department of physics at Haverford College from 1971 to 2012. During his years as a professor, in 1979, he was named the John and Barbara Bush Professor of Physics, In 1983, he was named a fellow of the American Physical Society, "for his imaginative research on Rayleigh–Bénard convection which has contributed significantly to the understanding of the transition to turbulence", and was elected as a member of the National Academy of Sciences in 1993.

== Personal life and death ==
Gollub was married to Diane Nissen. Their marriage lasted until Gollub's death in 2019.

Gollub died in Haverford, Pennsylvania on June 8, 2019, at the age of 74.
