= Stephen Heilmann =

Greenlandic politician and journalist (1941–2019)

Stephen Heilmann (17 August 1941 – 1 June 2019) was a Greenlandic politician and journalist.

== Biography ==
Stephen Heilmann was born in Nuuk, son of the accountant Peter Heilmann and his wife Mariane Olsen. On August 7, 1982, he married the social pedagogue Regine Dorph.

Stephen Heilmann studied medicine and sociology at the University of Copenhagen. From 1967 to 1974 he worked as a freelancer in the Copenhagen editorial of Kalaallit Nunaata Radioa. He then became director of Nuuk TV. From 1976 he was Program Secretary at the KNR. In 1983, he ran for parliamentary elections, but could not reach enough votes to enter the Inatsisartut. However, he was still appointed Minister of Culture, Education and Church in the Second Motzfeldt cabinet. After only one year there were new elections and the whole thing was repeated: Heilmann did not get enough votes and was later re-elected Minister of the same departments in the Third Motzfeldt cabinet. In 1987, he again ran unsuccessfully and resumed his position as KNR program secretary. In 1988 he became information director at Nuna-Tek. From 1994 to 1995, he was Under-Head of Radio News at the KNR, then Editor-in-Chief, before becoming Program Secretary again in 1997 for a year and most recently as Under-Secretary.

In addition to his work as program secretary, he was from 1976 member of the Greenland Press Association and from 1979 to 1981 its chairman. From 1978 he was also a member of the Danish Journalists Association. On 27 December 2007 he was awarded the Nersornaat in silver. He died after a brief illness on 1 June 2019 at the age of 77 years.
