= Gerry Spiess =

American sailor (1940–2019)

- Born: Gerald F. Spiess; January 24, 1940; Saint Paul, Minnesota, U.S.
- Died: June 18, 2019 (aged 79); Pine County, Minnesota, U.S.
- Occupation: School teacher
- Known for: Sailing single-handed across the Atlantic Ocean in a 10-foot (3.0 m) sailboat

Gerald F. Spiess (January 24, 1940 – June 18, 2019) was an American schoolteacher best known for having sailed his 10-foot (3.0 m) home-built sailboat Yankee Girl solo across the Atlantic Ocean in 1979 and across the Pacific in 1981.

== Sailboat construction ==
Spiess designed and built the boat in his garage in suburban White Bear Lake, Minnesota, from plywood. After a test launch in the local lake, Spiess transported the boat to the East Coast for launch. He sailed from Norfolk, Virginia, on June 1, 1979, arriving in Falmouth, England, after a 54-day Atlantic crossing.

== Legacy ==
In 1991, a tribute song was written about Spiess's journey with Yankee Girl.

== See also ==
- Tinkerbelle, the story of a similar sailing feat in 1965.
