= Philip George Burke =

British physicist (1932–2019)

Philip George Burke CBE
- Born: 18 October 1932
- Died: 4 June 2019 (aged 86)
- Education: University College of the South West; University College London
- Known for: R-matrix method
- Scientific career
- Workplaces: Queen's University Belfast

Philip George Burke FRS (18 October 1932—4 June 2019) was a British theoretical and computational physicist who developed the R-matrix method for studying electron collisions with atoms and molecules.

== Life ==
He was born in London. He graduated from University College of the South West, and University College London. He worked at the National Physical Laboratory, Teddington. From 1959 to 1960, he worked at the Lawrence Berkeley Radiation Laboratory.

The majority of Burke's research career was based at Queen's University Belfast, where he was a member of the Centre for Theoretical Atomic, Molecular and Optical Physics.

He was elected Fellow of the Royal Society in 1978 and was awarded a CBE in 1993.
