= Bruno Civitico =

Italian-born American painter (1942–2019)

- Born: September 1, 1942; Friuli-Venezia Giulia, Italy
- Died: June 1, 2019 (aged 76); Charleston, South Carolina, U.S.
- Education: Indiana University, Bloomington, MFA; Pratt Institute, BFA
- Occupation: Painter
- Style: Neoclassical Figurative Revival
- Movement: Modern Classicism
- Partner: Karen Berg
- Awards: Ingram-Merrill Foundation Grant, Louis Comfort Tiffany Foundation Painting Prize, National Endowment for the Arts Fellowship, Guggenheim Foundation Fellowship
- Website: www.brunocivitico.com

Bruno Civitico (September 1, 1942 – June 1, 2019) was an Italian-born American painter, draughtsman and teacher. He is widely considered to be "a major player in the development of Classicism," and "one of the most important artists of the Neoclassical Figurative revival movement."

== Biography ==
Civitico is known for painting in "styles ranging from perceptual realism, through classicism, to a highly individual Neo-Baroque Mannerism." Working in the narrative tradition, his subject matter spanned "classic themes of the figure, still life, and landscape." His "gently cubist-inflected" paintings relied on multiple perspectives to develop dialogues between the past and the present, with each illuminating the other in both simple still lifes and imaginative classical allegories."

In 2000, prior to the opening of a retrospective called Bruno Civitico: Portraits and Figures, Civitico described his work this way:

This group of drawings, studies, and paintings of female portraits and figures, span nearly forty years and present an almost continuous view of a segment of my work. There have been many other subjects ... male portraits and figures, multi-genre compositions in the landscape and in the interior, landscapes and still lifes, some with allegorical, mythological or narrative themes. Overall, my work has been evenly divided between these different subjects, themes, and modes, and it has, not inappropriately, been identified with the realist, classicist and post-modernist tendencies in the art of this time. I say 'not appropriately' because some of these characteristic aspects of the art do in fact intertwine.

Civitico is sometimes described as a South Carolina artist because he spent the second half of his life there. But he was the only child of Italian-speaking parents, and born in Italy. He also strongly identified with Italian art, a preference New York Times critic James R. Mellow recognized when he wrote, in 1973, that Civitico's work "hark[ed] back to Poussin and the Italian Renaissance masters in his landscape and allegorical paintings." A former student of the painter Gabriel Laderman, Civitico shared his fascination with figuration and myth, both rare interests in an era dominated by minimalism and other forms of post-modern abstraction.

"It is possible to find an equally strong Italian element in [the Italian-born American artist Floriano Vecchi's] works, whether still-life or figural," The New York Sun's James Gardner observed in 2008. "He conceives them as someone who had grown up in the vicinity of the full-bodied classicism of the Renaissance and of Annibale Carracci's Bolognese Academy. There is an implicit comfort in, and respect for, these ancient traditions, such as you see in the art of Giorgio de Chirico and, more recently, in Bruno Civitico and Claudio Bravo."

But critic Frederick Turner had already analyzed Civitico's relationship to the past more than a decade earlier."Classical realist painters such as David Ligare and Bruno Civitico illuminate a contemporary consciousness with ancient light," he wrote. In 1982, Civitico described his interest"in the reinterpretation of mythological themes and the use of abstraction and simplification," as key elements in his work. The noted critic Charles Jencks later described Civitico as a modern classicist, in search of an allegory both fabulous and real. Civitico's aesthetics echo that description. David Carbone has called his figures "postpainterly," describing their "extreme sculptural tactility," which he theorizes, "hold the key to the expressiveness of his work," and which evolved from an early sympathy for "the closely observed perceptual representation of Philip Pearlstein, building form through large shapes in pale-toned values. This way of modeling is distinctly modernist: opaque paint strokes in both the lights and shadows, painted in sharp focus on a large scale in a pared-down environment. This initially placed his work alongside other similarly 'cool' figurative painters such as William Bailey, Gabriel Laderman, and Alfred Leslie." Carbone's reference to "tactile" expressiveness is echoed by New York Times critic Hilton Kramer. "In Group of Bathers in Landscape," he writes "the nude figures occupy a truly lyrical space," which he then contrasted to other "big, finished nudes" in the show, he considered "strained and artificial."

The Schoelkopf Gallery's "interest in figurative painting that incorporated elements of allegory, myth, fantasy, and dreams," The Smithsonian Archives explains in its finding aide"is evinced in files relating to artists such as Milet Andrejevic ... Gabriel Laderman," and likely accounts for Civitico's decade-long relationship with them, beginning with his first solo exhibition in the early 1970s. He went on to spend much of the next decade exhibiting at San Francisco's Contemporary Realist Gallery, beginning in 1985.

In 1990, Civitico curated the exhibition Landscape Painting 1960-1990, The Italian Tradition in American Art at the prestigious Spoleto Festival USA at Charleston's Gibbes Museum of Art under Director Paul Figeroa. A decade later, he was awarded his largest commission for a nine-foot by nine-foot tryptic mural, representing dance, music and theater for the Brooks Center for the Performing Arts, at the Clemson University College of Architecture, Arts and Humanities in Georgia.

== Personal life ==
Civitico was born in 1942 in the municipality of Dignano D'Istria in the Friuli-Venezia Giulia region of northeastern Italy. His family emigrated to the United States when he was nine, moving first to Minnesota and then to Paterson, New Jersey.

== Academic affiliations ==
Civitico earned a BFA in Fine Arts at Pratt Institute in 1966. In 1968, he was graduated from Indiana University with an MFA. After graduation, he returned to the Greater New York area to teach first at Princeton, then Temple University where painter Amy Weiskopf credits him for being her "biggest influence." Civitico eventually relocated to New England to teach at the University of New Hampshire, where he taught noted still life painter Jeanne Duval. In 1987, he moved to Charleston, South Carolina, where he continued to teach privately, mentoring painter Patrick Servedio while actively exhibiting and accepting commissions.

== Awards ==
The recipient of several honors, awards and fellowships, Civitico was a recipient of the 1990 Ingram-Merrill Foundation Grant. In 1981, he won the Louis Comfort Tiffany Foundation Painting Prize, in 1980 he was awarded a National Endowment for the Arts Fellowship and, in 1979, he received the John Simon Guggenheim Memorial Foundation Fellowship.

== Exhibitions ==
=== Solo exhibitions ===
- Robert Schoelkopf Gallery, New York, NY, 1983, 80, 78, 76, 73.
- The Gallery, Portsmouth, NH, 1987.
- Manchester Institute of Arts and Sciences, Manchester, NH, 1987.
- Contemporary Realist Gallery, San Francisco, CA, 1992, 1988, 1985.
- College of Charleston, Charleston, SC, 1995.
- Gibbes Museum of Art, Charleston, SC, 1995.
- Mac Masters Gallery, University of South Carolina, Columbia, SC, 2000.
- Opening Reception: Performing Arts Tryptic. The Brooks Center for the Performing Arts, Clemson, GA, 2000.
- Figure Drawings Over 40 Years: Bruno Civitico. Bo Bartlett Center, Columbus State University, Georgia, 2018.

=== Group exhibitions ===
- Varieties of Figurative Art. Bard College, Annandale-on-Hudson, NY, 1969
- Realisti Americani. Galleria Il Fante di Spade, Rome, Italy, 1969
- Direct Representation. Fischbach Gallery, New York, NY, 1969
- Forecasts 69-70. Vassar College Art Gallery, Poughkeepsie, NY, 1969
- The Realist Revival. The New York Cultural Center, New York, NY, 1972
- Contemporary Landscapes. MOMA, Penthouse, New York, NY, 1972
- Patron's Choice. De Cordova Museum, Lincoln, MA, 1976 (catalog)
- Toward a Renewal of Classicism. Bayly Art Museum, Charlottesville, VA, 1978
- Narrative Painting. Allan Frumkin Gallery, New York, NY, 1981
- Still Life Painting. Robert Schoelkopf Gallery, New York, NY, 1983
- Modern Myths: Classical Renewal. Boise Museum, Boise, ID, 1987 (catalog)
- The Italian Tradition in Contemporary Landscape Painting, 1960-1990. Gibbes Museum of Art, Charleston, SC and Bayly Art Museum, University of Virginia, Charlottesville, VA, 1990 (catalog)
- New American Figure Painting. Contemporary Realist Gallery, San Francisco, CA, 1992 (catalog)
- Vividly Told, Contemporary Narrative Painting. Morris Museum, GA and Gibbes Museum of Art, SC, 1994 (catalog)
- Artists Who Look Back: Spirituality in Contemporary Art. Museo Italo Americano, SF, CA, 1998 (catalog)
- Between Earth and Heaven, New Classical Movements in the Art of Today. Museum of Modern Art, Ostend, Belgium, 2000
- Between Perception & Invention: Three Generations of Figurative Artists. Sharon Arts Center, Peterborough, NH, 2005 (catalog)
- Aspects of Influence, University of Virginia Art Museum, Charlottesville, VA, 2005

== Bibliography ==
- Agar, Eunice. 1982. "Bruno Civitico." American Artist Magazine. Vol. 46 Issue 476, p. 42.
- Cooper, James F. 1993. "The Will to Beauty, Henri Matisse to Bruno Civitico." American Arts Quarterly.
- Hollander, John. 1990. Landscape Painting 1960-1990: The Italian Tradition in American Art. Gibbs Museum of Art. ASIN: B001IK9E1C.
- Lucie-Smith, Edward. 1999. ARTODAY. Phaidon.
- Mann, James. 1995. "The Mastery of Bruno Civitico," American Arts Quarterly.
- New Hampshire State Council on the Arts. 1989. "In Unexpected Places." Concord, NH.
- Heller, Jules and Nancy G. Heller, ed. 1997. North American Women Artists of the Twentieth Century: A Biographical Dictionary. Routledge: Garland Reference Library of the Humanities (Book 1219), ISBN 978-0815325840
- Jencks, Charles. 1987. Post Modernism: The New Classicism in Art and Architecture. New York: Rizzoli. ISBN 978-0847808359
- Jencks, Charles. 1986. What is Post Modernism? New York: St Martin's Press. ISBN 9780312866037, 9780856708800
- Pincus-Witen, Robert. 1969. Art Forum (November review)
- Rundell, John, ed. Aesthetics and Modernity: Essays by Agnes Heller. 2010. New York: Lexington Books, ISBN 978-0739141311
- Van den Busche, W. 2000. Between Earth and Heaven, New Classical Movements in the Art of Today. Ostend, Belgium: Museum of Modern Art Catalog.
- Ward, John L. 1989. American Realist Painting 1945-1980. Ann Arbor, Michigan: UMI Research Press. ISBN 978-0835720793

== Publications ==
- "An Introduction to Baldassarre Orsini's Saggio Sulla Pintura," 1995. American Arts Quarterly.
- Curator, 1990. The Italian Tradition in Contemporary American Landscape Painting, 1960-1990. Gibbes Museum of Art, Charleston, SC and Bayly Art Museum, Charlottesville, VA (catalog)
- Laderman, Gabriel. "An Analysis of Recent Paintings." American Artists Magazine
