= Jan Karwecki =

Polish footballer (1949–2019)

Personal information
- Date of birth: 2 January 1949
- Place of birth: Glinno, Poland
- Date of death: 5 June 2019 (aged 70)
- Place of death: Kraków, Poland
- Height: 1.81 m (5 ft 11 in)
- Position: Goalkeeper

Senior career*
Years	Team	Apps	(Gls)
1968–1973	Górnik Wałbrzych		
1973–1976	Lech Poznań	60	(0)
1976–1978	Szombierki Bytom	48	(0)
1978–1979	Wisła Kraków	14	(0)
1979–1981	Cracovia	25	(0)
Total		147	(0)

International career
1974–1975	Poland	5	(0)
- * Club domestic league appearances and goals

Jan Karwecki (2 January 1949 – 5 June 2019) was a Polish footballer who played as a goalkeeper.

== Career ==
Born in Glinno, Karwecki played club football for Górnik Wałbrzych, Lech Poznań, Szombierki Bytom, Wisła Kraków and Cracovia.

He earned five caps for the Poland national team between 1974 and 1975.

== Later life and death ==
Karwecki died in Kraków on 5 June 2019, aged 70.
