= Paul Winner =

Jewish artist, Liberal, magistrate and PR pioneer

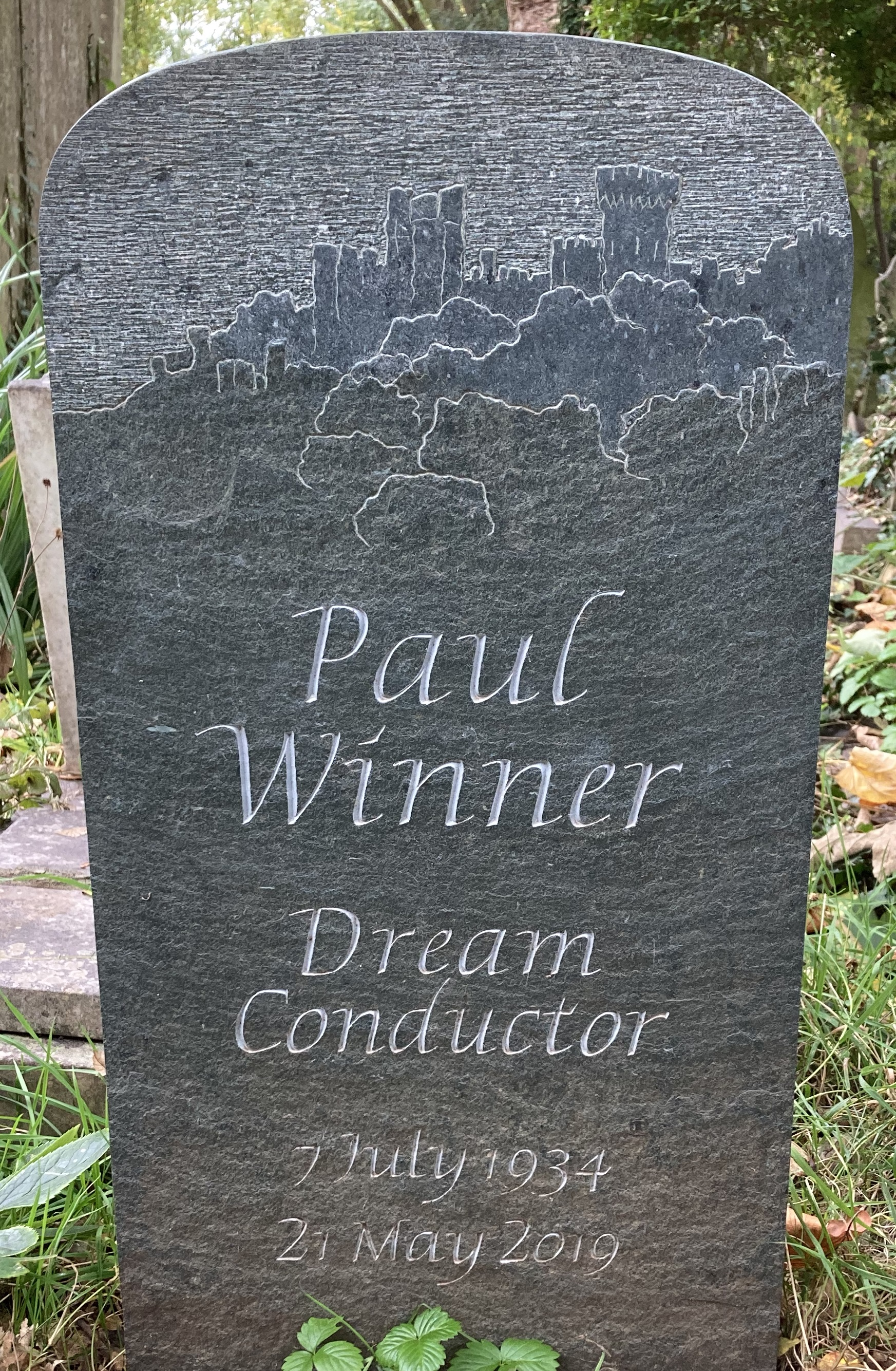
Grave of Paul Winner in Highgate Cemetery

Paul Winner (1934–2019) was an artist, Liberal activist, magistrate and public relations manager.

His works included the textbook, Effective PR Management, and a caricature of Pope John Paul II.

His ashes are buried on the eastern side of Highgate Cemetery.
