= Friederike de Haas =

German politician (1944–2019)

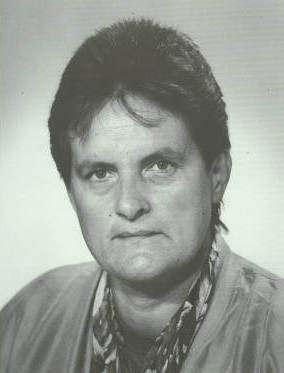
De Haas in 1990

Friederike Else Käte de Haas (16 August 1944 – 17 June 2019) was a German politician for the Christian Democratic Union (CDU). In 1990, she was elected as a member of the Landtag of the Free State of Saxony, serving until 2009. She also chaired the German War Graves Commission. In 2012, de Haas received the Order of Merit of the Free State of Saxony.

Born in Bielatal, de Haas and her husband, a gynaecologist, had four children. She died on 17 June 2019, at the age of 74.
