= Anne Vanderlove =

French-Dutch singer and songwriter (1939–2019)

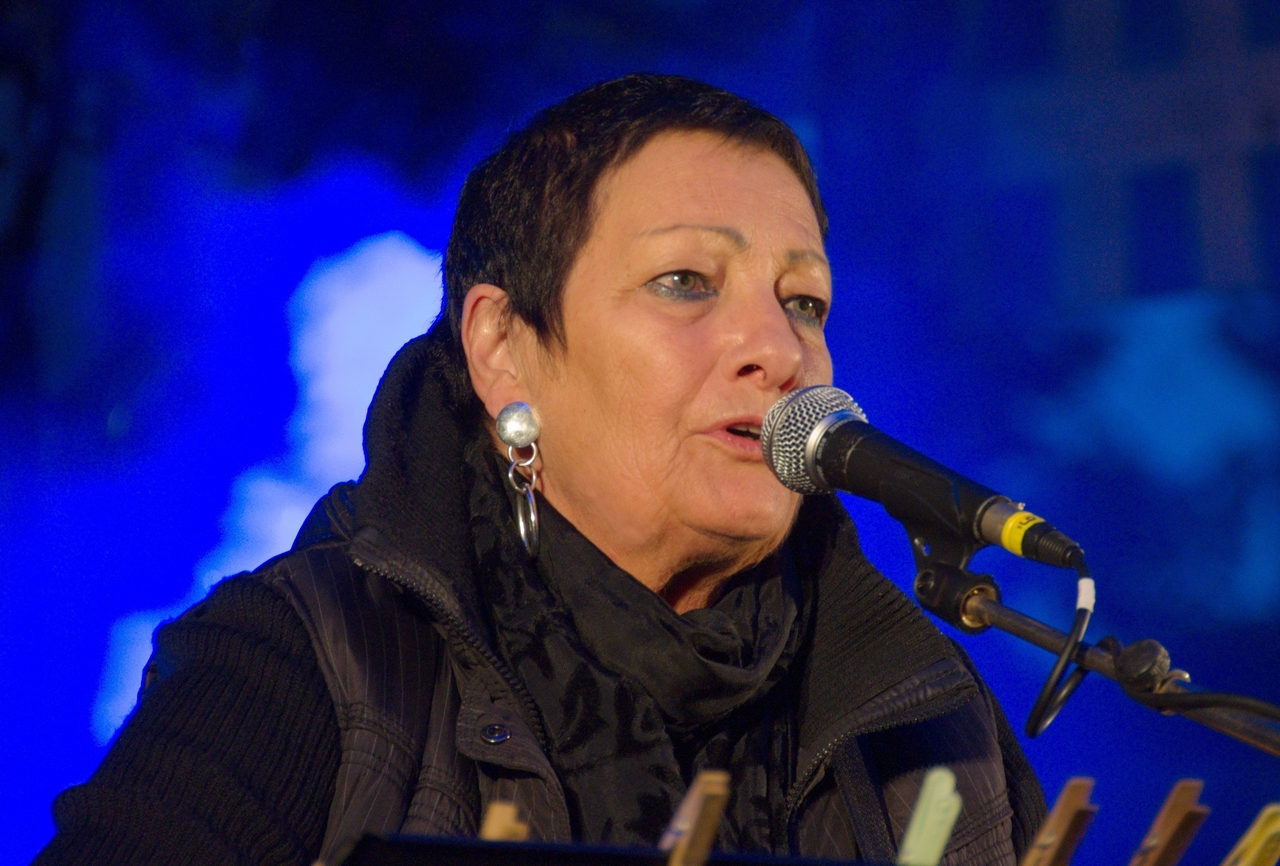
- Vanderlove in 2012
- Born: Anna van der Leeuw; 11 December 1943; The Hague, South Holland, Netherlands
- Died: 30 June 2019 (aged 79); Finistère, Brittany, France
- Known for: singer/songwriter

Anna van der Leeuw (Dutch pronunciation: [ˈɑnaː vɑn dər ˈleːu]; 11 December 1939 – 30 June 2019), better known by her stage name Anne Vanderlove, was a Dutch-born French singer and songwriter, known as the French Joan Baez.

== Life ==
Vanderlove was born in The Hague in 1939. Her father was Dutch and her mother was from Brittany. Her parents divorced and she was raised in a Breton way by her mother's parents. She studied philosophy in Paris.

In 1966 she found herself again in Paris where the plan had been to set out on a humanitarian mission, instead she was intrigued by the capital's singers. Soon she was singing to entertain. She was engaged at Chez Georges on rue des Canettes and she was singing her own songs. The following February she was recording her first song "Ballade of November" and months later an album of the same name, after she was discovered by Pathé-Marconi.

Her first album was awarded the "Grand Prix" of the Académie de la Chanson Française. She had a number of successful songs but disagreements with her record company scuppered the chances of a second album. She was annoyed that her record company were talking of her having plastic surgery and wearing a blond wig. She had been singing to support strikers during the Paris Riots of 1968. She remained in the music industry and she was backing Gerard Manset on his 1970 album, The Death of Orion.

She continued to release albums in 1987. Ten years later she started again and released Bleus in 1997, Silver in 1999 and Escales in 2000. She was then notably involved in a collaboration with a school to release a CD titled, Pour que les oiseaux vivre heureux, after the sinking of the oil tanker MV Erika tragedy.

Vanderlove died in Finistère in 2019.
