= Giovanni Furlani =

Italian ice hockey player

Personal information
- Nationality: Italian
- Born: 4 September 1936 Bolzano, Italy
- Died: 26 June 2019 (aged 82) Petawawa, Ontario, Canada

Sport
- Sport: Ice hockey

Giovanni “Ronald” Furlani (4 September 1936 – 26 June 2019) was an Italian ice hockey player. He competed in the men's tournament at the 1956 Winter Olympics. Furlani died on 26 June 2019, at the age of 83.
