= Marv Bevan =

Canadian football player (1935–2019)

Profile
- Positions: Tackle, Guard

Personal information
- Born: July 6, 1935; Hamilton, Ontario, Canada
- Died: June 23, 2019 (aged 83); Ontario, Canada
- Listed height: 6 ft 0 in (1.83 m)
- Listed weight: 245 lb (111 kg)

Career history
- 1956–1964: Ottawa Rough Riders

Awards and highlights
- Grey Cup champion (1960)

Marvin Edwin Bevan (July 6, 1935 – June 23, 2019) was a Canadian professional football player who played for the Ottawa Rough Riders. He won the Grey Cup with them in 1960. He was the brother of Eddie Bevan of the Hamilton Tiger-Cats.
