= Charles E. Flyte =

American politician

Member of the South Dakota Senate
- In office 1975–1978

Personal details
- Born: February 20, 1934 Hot Springs, South Dakota, U.S.
- Died: June 23, 2019 (aged 85) Gilbert, Arizona, U.S.
- Party: Democratic
- Spouse: Gerda
- Children: 2

Charles E. Flyte (February 20, 1934 – June 23, 2019) was an American politician. He served as a Democratic member of the South Dakota Senate.

== Life and career ==
Flyte was born in Hot Springs, South Dakota. He was a rancher.

Flyte served in the South Dakota Senate from 1975 to 1978.

Flyte died on June 23, 2019 in Gilbert, Arizona, at the age of 85.
