= Brigitte Swoboda =

Austrian actress (1943–2019)

Brigitte Swoboda (1 February 1943 - 24 June 2019) was an Austrian actor.

== Early life ==
Brigitte Swoboda was born in the Brigittenau district of Vienna in 1943. She grew up in the Innere Stadt, the first municipal District of Vienna. As a child, she knew she wanted to be either a pianist or an actress. Although she started an apprenticeship as a graphic designer, at 17 she began a career in the theater. She remained an amateur actor stayed for a long time with the "Neuen Wiener Bühne" (New Viennese Stage).

== Career ==
Her break came in 1969, when she played the part of Birgit in Wolfgang Bauer's first play, Magic Afternoon at the Viennese Ateliertheatre. Brigitte Swoboda was awarded the Kainz-Medaille for her work in this role.

Swoboda was discovered by Gustav Manker in 1969 and became involved with the People's theater of Vienna. She debuted as Salome Pockerl, the partner of Helmut Qualtinger in Nestroy's The Talisman. In this role, Swoboda broke with tradition. In the words of one journalist, "Swoboda was not a cute Rousseauen creature" but rather "lost through sheer negligence, a most uncomfortably cut proletarian, a shadowy growth from the lowest depths, a discarded changeling from a stable full of city teenagers". The well known couplet, Ja, die Männer hab’n ’s gut! (Yes, men have it so good!), sounded "so dangerous, as if it was scratched with a rusty knife". (Süddeutsche Zeitung)

After this performance, Swoboda played the role of nurse Riki in the premiere of Wolfgang Bauers Change (1969). Swoboda became a popular folk actress and played alongside Heinz Petters, Dolores Schmidinger and Hilde Sochor as part of the famous Nestroy ensemble at the People's Theater in several productions, including Heimliches Geld, heimliche Liebe (Secret Money, Secret Love, 1972), Gegen Torheit gibt es kein Mittel (There Are No Means against Folly, 1973), Umsonst! (For Nothing!, 1974) and Das Gewürzkrämerkleeblatt (literally: The Spice Seller, 1977).

Swoboda appeared in productions at the Altwiener Volkstheaters (Old Viennese People's Theater) of plays by Ferdinand Raimund, playing such parts as Rosa in Der Verschwender (The Squanderer), Linda in Der Barometermacher auf der Zauberinsel (The Barometer Maker on the Magic Island) and Ludwig Anzengruber (Pepi Schlanater in Das vierte Gebot (The Fourth Commandment), 1970). She brought out the main points in the premieres from Peter Turrini (Die Wirtin, (The Landlady) 1975), Walter Wippersberg (Was haben vom Lebe, (What a Life) 1976), Franz Xaver Kroetz (Nicht Fisch, nicht Fleisch (Not Fish, Not Meat) 1980), Heinz Rudolf Unger (Zwölfeläuten (The Twelfth Ring), 1984) and Felix Mitterer (Kein schöner Land (No Land more Beautiful), 1987).

Swoboda remained part of the People's Theater ensemble until her retirement in 2003. She was appointed an honorary member.

Swoboda was known through television appearances, including as Frau Wybiral in Der neue Untermieter (The New Sublet) and in her role as groundskeeper Koziber in the cult classic, Kaisermühlen Blues.

More recently she performed at her home theater, among others, in Nestroy's Das Mädl aus der Vorstadt (The Girl from the Suburb), Der böse Geist Lumpazivagabundus (The Evil Spirit Lumpazivagabundus) and in Broch's Die Erzählung der Magd Zerline (The Story of the Maid Zerline).

She starred in the 2017 production of Meine Innere Stadt produced by the Austrian Broadcasting Corporation (2017).

Brigitte Swoboda died at the age of 76 in June 2019 at a hospital in Kittsee in Burgenland after a long illness. She is to be buried at her last place of residence, Apetlon, in the Neusiedl am See District.

== Film and television ==
- 1970: Fall Regine Kraus (TV)
- 1972: The Good Soldier Švejk (TV Series), starring Fritz Muliar
- 1972: Der letzte Werkelmann (The Last Organ Grinder)
- 1976: Der junge Freud (Young Dr. Freud, television)
- 1976: Jakob der Letzte (Jakob the Last, TV)
- 1977: Die Alpensaga, Teil 3 - das große Fest (The saga of the Alps, part 3 - the big festival, TV)
- 1980: Tatort (TV Series: Episode: Morder by guessing)
- 1981: Der Bockerer
- 1983: Der gute Engel (The good angel, TV)
- 1988: Wiener Walzer (Viennese waltz, TV)
- 1992-2000: Kaisermühlen Blues (TV series)
- 2000: Lumpazivagabundus (TV)
- 2001: Inspector Rex (Episode: The Girl and the Murderer, TV series)
- 2006: Feine Dame

== Theater ==
- 2003: Anatevka (Volksoper): Golde
- 2010: Lilliom (Volkstheatre)

== Radio Plays ==
- 2008: Marie von Ebner-Eschenbach: Das Gemeindekind (The Community Child) Directed by: Götz Fritsch

== Awards ==
- 1969: Kainz-Medaille - Promotional Award
- 1970/1971: Karl-Skraup-Preis - Young Talent Award
- 1976/1977: Karl-Skraup-Preis - Best Performance
- 1989: Ehrenmedaille der Bundeshauptstadt Wien (Medal of Honor of the capital city Vienna) - Silver
- 1993/1994: Karl-Skraup-Preis - Best Supporting Role
- 1996: Nestroy-Ring
- 2004: Silver Decoration for Service to the State of Vienna
