= Warren Niesłuchowski =

American-Polish artist, writer, editor, and translator (1946–2019)

Warren Niesłuchowski (Altenstadt, October 11, 1946 – New York, June 17, 2019) was an American-Polish artist, writer, editor, translator and Vietnam War deserter who "inspired philosophical questions for many about home, exile, and family." According to ArtReview, his "nomadic lifestyle came to be considered as an artwork in itself."

== Early life ==
Born in a displaced person camp in Altenstadt, Germany to a Polish-Ukrainian couple, Niesłuchowski's family immigrated to the United States. He was raised in New Bedford, Massachusetts, and attended the College of the Holy Cross in Worcester. In 1968 Niesłuchowski moved to Europe to desert the Vietnam War draft. He initially settled in Paris where he performed with the Bread and Puppet Theater throughout Europe and in Asia. He returned to the US in 1974, after Gerald Ford offered amnesty to Vietnam deserters, and enrolled in an undergraduate art programme at Harvard. Following a chance meeting with the then director of the P.S.1 Contemporary Art Center Alanna Heiss, he moved to New York to become Heiss's assistant. After losing his East Village apartment, Niesłuchowski adopted a nomadic lifestyle, often staying with friends across the globe.

== Career in Publishing ==
Niesłuchowski worked for many years as a freelance editor for Routledge. He then worked on many books and exhibition catalogues both as translator and writer, including Joan Jonas: Five Works (Queens Museum of Art, 2005); A Wall of Two: Poems of Resistance and Suffering from Kraków to Buchenwald and Beyond (University of California Press, 2007); MoMA PS1: A History (The Museum of Modern Art, New York, 2019); and Pop or Populus: Art Between High and Low (Sternberg Press, Berlin, 2010).

== Legacy ==
Niesłuchowski was the subject of two video works by American artist Simon Leung, Warren Piece (1993) and War After War (2011). In 2013 Polish filmmaker Dominik Lejman created a piece on him called Portrait of a Philosopher (Warren Niesluchowski), In 2020, Joanna Warsza and Sina Najafi curated the exhibition “And Warren Niesłuchowski Was There: Guest, Host, Ghost” about Niesłuchowski's life. The exhibition opened at Cabinet magazine's event space in Berlin before traveling to the Foksal Gallery Foundation in Warsaw. A book of the same title was co-published that year by Cabinet Books and the Museum of Modern Art in Warsaw.
