= Elio Cruz =

Gibraltarian playwright (1931–2019)

Elio Cruz (1931 – 14 June 2019) was a Gibraltarian playwright, who composed both in English and in Llanito. Cruz co-founded the Theatre Group 56 with Luis Azzopardi and Cecil Gomez. Cruz penned two of the most successful plays staged in Gibraltar: La Lola se va pa Londre and Connie con cama camera en el comedor, both in the 1960s.

Cruz died on 14 June 2019 at the age of 87.

== Plays ==
- La Lola se va pa Londre (1966): comedy in two parts and seven acts
- Connie con cama camera en el comedor (1969): comedy in two parts and ten acts
- Cuando la Lola regrese de Londres

== Bibliography ==
- Fierro Cubiella, Eduardo (1997). Gibraltar, aproximación a un estudio sociolingüístico y cultural de la Roca. Cádiz: Universidad, Servicio de Publicaciones. P. 77. ISBN 84-7786-440-3
