= Irena Backus =

Theologian and historian (1950–2019)

Professor Irena Backus
- Born: 1950
- Died: 13 June 2019; Geneva, Switzerland

Academic background
- Education: Somerville College, Oxford
- Thesis: Influence of Theodore Beza on the English New Testament (1976)
- Doctoral advisor: S. L. Greenslade

Academic work
- Discipline: Intellectual history
- Sub-discipline: The Reformation
- Institutions: University of Geneva
- Main interests: Reformation-era biblical studies and patristics
- Website: www.unige.ch/ihr/fr/equipe/professeurs-honoraires/backus/

Irena Dorota Backus (1950 – 13 June 2019) was a professor of the History of the Reformation at the University of Geneva.

== Life ==
Born in Poland in 1950, Backus studied at Somerville College, Oxford. She obtained her doctorate in 1976, with a thesis on Theodore Beza's influence on the English New Testament, published in 1980 as The Reformed Roots of the English New Testament: The Influence of Theodore Beza. From 1982 she was employed at the Institute for Reformation History in Geneva. A Festschrift in her honour was published in 2018, Crossing Traditions: Essays on the Reformation and Intellectual History in Honour of Irena Backus, edited by Maria-Cristina Pitassi and Daniela Solfaroli Camillocci with the collaboration of Arthur Huiban (Leiden, Brill).

She was obliged to stop work by a stroke in 2014, and died in Geneva on 13 June 2019.

== Works ==
- Report on the De Halpert and Corbett family papers, 1867-1936, listed by Irena Backus (London: Royal Commission on Historical Manuscripts, 1976)
- Logique et Theologie au XVIe Siecle (Geneva: Université de Neuchatel, 1980)
- The Reformed Roots of the English New Testament: The Influence of Theodore Beza (Pittsburgh, Pa: Pickwick Press, 1980)
- Martin Borrhaus (Cellarius) (Baden-Baden: Editions Valentin Koerner, 1981)
- Martini Buceri opera omnia. Series 2 Opera latina. Vol.2 Enarratio in Evangelion Johannis, edidit Irena Backus (Leiden: Brill, 1987)
- Théorie et pratique de l'exégèse: actes du troisième colloque international sur l'histoire de l'exégèse biblique au 16e siècle (Genève, 31 août - 2 septembre 1988), edited by Irena Backus and Francis Higman (Geneva: Droz, 1990)
- Lectures humanistes de Basile de Césarée: traductions latines (1439-1618) (Paris: Institut d'Études Augustiniennes, 1990)
- The Disputations of Baden, 1526 and Berne, 1528: Neutralizing the Early Church (Princeton, N.J.: Princeton Theological Seminary, 1993)
- Le miracle de Laon: le déraisonnable, le raisonnable, l'apocalyptique et le politique dans les récits du Miracle de Laon, 1566-1578 (Paris: J. Vrin, 1994)
- The Reception of the Church Fathers in the West: From the Carolingians to the Maurists, edited by Irena Backus (Leiden, Brill, 1997)
- Les sept visions et la fin des temps: les commentaires genevois de l'Apocalypse entre 1539 et 1584 (Geneva: Droz, 1997)
- Reformation Readings of the Apocalypse: Geneva, Zurich and Wittenberg (Oxford: Oxford University Press, 2000)
- Jean Calvin, Traité des reliques, edited by Irena Backus (Geneva: Labor et Fides, 2000)
- Historical Method and Confessional Identity in the Era of the Reformation, 1378-1615 (Leiden: Brill, 2003)
- Life Writing in Reformation Europe: Lives of Reformers by Friends, Disciples and Foes (Aldershot: Ashgate, 2008)
- Calvin and his influence, 1509-2009, edited by Irena Backus and Philip Benedict (Oxford: Oxford University Press, 2011)
- L'argument hérésiologique : l'Église ancienne et les Réformes, XVIe-XVIIe siècles : actes du colloque de Tours, 10-11 septembre 2010, edited by Irena Backus, Philippe Büttgen and Bernard Pouderon (Paris: Beauchesne, 2012)
- "'Semipelagianism': The Origins of the Term and its Passage into the History of Heresy", Journal of Ecclesiastical History, 65:1 (2014), pp. 25–46
- Leibniz: Protestant Theologian (Oxford: Oxford University Press, 2016)
