= Jonás Gómez Gallo =

Chilean businessman and politician (1923–2019)

Jonás Gómez
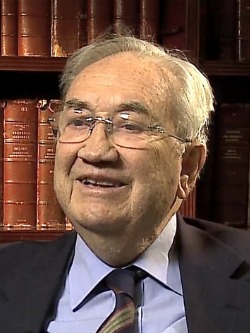

Member of the Senate
- In office 15 May 1961 – 15 May 1969
- Constituency: Tarapacá and Antofagasta

Member of the Chamber of Deputies
- In office 15 May 1957 – 15 May 1961
- Constituency: Antofagasta, Tocopilla, El Loa and Taltal

Personal details
- Born: 12 July 1923 Antofagasta, Chile
- Died: 24 June 2019 (aged 95) Santiago, Chile
- Party: Radical Party; Radical Left Party
- Relatives: Pedro León Gallo (grandfather)
- Occupation: Politician
- Profession: Businessman

Jonás Gómez Gallo (12 July 1923 – 24 June 2019) was a Chilean businessman and politician, member of the Radical Party and later the Radical Left Party. He served as deputy and senator for the northern constituencies of Tarapacá and Antofagasta.

== Biography ==
He was the grandson of Pedro León Gallo, a politician and entrepreneur owner of the silver mine of Chañarcillo. Gómez studied at the Colegio British School of Antofagasta and the Liceo de Hombres de Antofagasta. At 17, he joined his father's company Sociedad Comercial Segundo Gómez y Compañía, later taking control of the family business, which expanded into the nationwide chain Distribuidora de Industrias Nacionales S.A. (DIN).

Besides retail, Gómez Gallo became an important mining entrepreneur in the 1980s, acquiring companies such as Coemin and Minera Carola, accumulating large copper assets in northern Chile. He also invested in banking, automotive distribution (Hyundai in Chile), and held shares in firms like Clínica Las Condes, LAN Airlines, Concha y Toro, and La Polar.

== Political career ==
He joined the Radical Party in 1948. In 1957, he was elected deputy for Antofagasta, Tocopilla, El Loa and Taltal, serving until 1961. He sat on the Permanent Commissions of Public Education, Economy and Commerce, Finance, and Mining and Industry.

In 1961, he became senator for Tarapacá and Antofagasta (1961–1969). His work focused on decentralization and regional development. He was part of delegations to Belgrade (1963), China (1963), and Lima for the founding of the Parlamento Latinoamericano (1964).

In 1971 he left the Radical Party to join the Radical Left Party, which briefly supported the Unidad Popular before moving to opposition. In 1989 he ran unsuccessfully for senator for Atacama under the Democracia y Progreso list.

== Later years ==
He received several recognitions, such as the Ancla de Oro from the Municipality of Antofagasta (2003) and “Caminante 2007” in Soria, Spain. Gómez Gallo died in Santiago on 24 June 2019, aged 95.
