= Butsaran Thongchiew =

Thai singer and actress (1990–2019)

- บุตรศรัณย์ ทองชิว
- Born: September 21, 1990; Samut Sakhon Province, Thailand
- Died: June 14, 2019 (aged 28); Siriraj Hospital, Bangkok
- Other names: Namtarn
- Occupations: Singer; songwriter; musician; actor
- Years active: 2008–2019

Butsaran Thongchiew (Thai: บุตรศรัณย์ ทองชิว; September 21, 1990 – June 14, 2019) was a Thai singer, actress. She was born in Samut Sakhon Province, Thailand. Her father is a movie director, Viroj Thongchiew. Namtarn graduated from College of Music, Mahidol University. She was best known as a competitor of The Star 5 in 2009 and an actress of "Pookong Jaosane" as "Lieutenant Run" a comedy TV series on One31.

== Career ==
Butsaran attended a vocal talent competition TV show "The Star season 5" audition round in November, 2008 and qualified to final round. She was eliminated in second round. After eliminating on The Star 5, she continued working in entertainment path.

=== Songs ===
- Peur Dao Duang Nan - OST. The Star season 5
- Pa sa jai (Heart language) the original soundtrack of a comedy TV series "Pookong Jaosane"
- Meur Rao Mee Gun - OST. The Star season 5 (various artist)
- Medley - Mai yak rok ft. Grand, A and Radklao
- Yang rak gun yoo chai mai OST. Kam vela ha rak (Time to find love)
- Rueng mun jam pen - OST. Kam vela ha rak (Time to find love)
- Lover Coaster-Windy sugar ft. Win Nimman, the last performance of Numtarn

=== Music Videos ===
- Tua Tiew Deaw (Single ticket), Pra derm, Roop Ros Klin Seang - Sopon Panthong
- Pa sa jai (Own music video)
- Lover Coaster - Windy sugar ft. Win Nimman

=== Movie(s) ===
- Tewada Ta Ja Teng - Sahamongkol Film International

=== TV Series ===
- Poo kong jao sane as Lieutenant Run on One31 HD
- Kam vela ha rak (Time to find love) as Pin
- We born in reign of The King Rama IX, a special episode of Poo Kong Jao Sane
- Por Pla Lai as Mint

=== Concert ===
- The Star 5 concert

== Death ==
Numtarn suddenly "started bleeding heavily through her nose and mouth while at home in her native province of Samut Sakhon on Tuesday June 11, 2019. She was rushed to Samut Sakhon Hospital and transferred to Siriraj in Bangkok on the next day. She had to be resuscitated multiple times." After she was admitted to Siriraj Hospital, physicians and other prominent physicians held a press conference about the situation of Numtarn that 'unprecedented' and the physicians team are now investigating. On Friday June 14, 2019 2.17 A.M. her father, Viroj had written on his Facebook account that Numtarn was to 'die a peaceful death'. Her funeral was held in Wat Pomwicheanchotikaram temple in Amphoe Mueng, Samut Sakhon Province. The cause of death was determined to be nasopharyngeal tuberculosis.
