= Seder (disambiguation) =

Seder (Hebrew: סדר; plural: סדרים sedarim) is a Hebrew word meaning "order" or "sequence" may also refer to:

== Jewish holidays ==
- Passover Seder, a ritualized dinner observed during Passover
- Tu BiShvat, a seder for this minor Jewish holiday modeled on the Passover Seder

== Hebrew Bible ==
- A portion of a biblical book in the Masoretic Text of the Tanakh; this quantitative division is related to the triennial cycle for reading the Torah
- A colloquial term for the weekly Torah portion in the annual cycle of reading the Torah (in this context often pronounced sidra)

== Talmudic texts ==
- One of the six orders (major sections) of the Mishnah
- A study session in a Yeshiva's daily schedule; see Yeshiva § Structure and features.

== Jewish liturgy ==
- An order of prayers that constitutes a liturgy

== Jewish mysticism ==
- Seder hishtalshelus, a concept in kabbalah about the nature of God

== People with the surname ==
- Đuro Seder (born 1927), Croatian painter
- Sam Seder (born 1966), American actor
- Tim Seder (born 1974), American football player
