= Gamaleya Rock =

Rock formation in Antarctica

Gamaleya Rock (71°44′S 10°43′E) is a rock 2 nautical miles (4 km) southeast of Smirnov Peak, marking the extremity of a line of rocks that extend east from the Shcherbakov Range, in the Orvin Mountains of Queen Maud Land, Antarctic.

It was roughly plotted from air photos by the Third German Antarctic Expedition, 1938–39. It was mapped from air photos and surveys by the Sixth Norwegian Antarctic Expedition, 1956–60; remapped by the Soviet Antarctic Expedition, 1960–61, and named after the Russian Empire navigation scientist of Ukrainian origin Platon Yakovlevich Gamaleya.
