= Ann Roniger =

American high jumper and pentathlete (1943–2019)

- Ann Roniger, from a 1957 publication.
- Born: Martha Ann Roniger; February 13, 1943; Manhattan, Kansas, US
- Died: June 9, 2019 (aged 76); Oklahoma City, Oklahoma, US
- Other name: Ann Roniger Hussong (after 1962)
- Occupation: Educator
- Known for: Penthathlete

Ann Roniger (February 13, 1943 – June 9, 2019), later Ann Roniger Hussong, was an American athlete, a high jumper and pentathlete.

== Early life ==
Martha Ann Roniger was born in Manhattan, Kansas, the daughter of Pascal Allen Roniger and Martha Sharer Roniger. She was a member of 4-H. Her high school in Elmdale, Kansas had no track team, so her father and brother built some practice equipment on the farm, and Roniger trained in nearby Emporia. Ann Roniger attended Colorado State University in Fort Collins for one year, then transferred to the University of Hawaiʻi, on a full athletic scholarship.

== Career ==
In 1956, Roniger broke the national standing broad jump record, and tied the National Junior Olympic record for the 50-year dash. From 1957 to 1959, as a teenager in Elmdale, Kansas, Roniger was three-time Amateur Athletic Union (AAU) women's pentathlon national champion. Her 1957 win was considered especially notable, because she "had never competed previously in the shotput, hurdles, or high jump", three of the component events. She was featured in Sports Illustrated for her accomplishment. In 1958, she won three events, set two Ozark regional records, and finished with the highest total points across the five pentathlon events. In 1959 she was included in the All-America Women's Track and Field Team.

She continued competing as an athlete in college at Colorado State University, where she was a member of the school's first women's track and field team, along with sprinter Lillian Greene-Chamberlain, high jumper Ann Marie Flynn, and Rose Melanchuk. She aspired to a place on the American team for the 1960 Summer Olympics, but failed to qualify. In 1961 she transferred to the University of Hawaii, where she continued as a track athlete. In 1962, she set a state women's high jump record at Hawaii's Cooke Field.

In adulthood, Hussong was a health science teacher at a Kansas high school for 25 years. When she retired to Oklahoma, she became a professional organizer.

== Personal life ==
Ann Roniger married Bill Hussong in 1962. They had three children, William, Shawn, and Stephanie. She died in 2019, aged 76 years, in Oklahoma City, Oklahoma.
