= Ivan Prpić (physician) =

Croatian physician (1927–2019)

Ivan Prpić (11 October 1927 – 25 June 2019) was a Croatian physician.

He was born in Sisak in 1927 and graduated from the University of Zagreb School of Medicine in 1952, specializing in plastic reconstructive surgery. Prpić became a full professor at the Faculty of Medicine in 1976.

Prpić was a full member of the Croatian Academy of Sciences and Arts since 1991.

== Sources ==
- "Akademik Ivan Prpić". info.hazu.hr (in Croatian). Croatian Academy of Sciences and Arts.
