= Systolic Blood Pressure Intervention Trial =

- Study type: Randomized controlled trial
- Dates: 2010–2015
- Locations: 102 clinical sites in the US
- Funding: National Institutes of Health
- Published: 2015
- Article: Wright JT, Williamson JD, Whelton PK, Snyder JK, Sink KM, Rocco MV, et al. (November 2015). "A Randomized Trial of Intensive versus Standard Blood-Pressure Control". The New England Journal of Medicine. 373 (22): 2103–2116. doi:10.1056/NEJMoa1511939. PMC 4689591. PMID 26551272.

The Systolic Blood Pressure Intervention Trial (SPRINT) is a multi-center clinical trial that was performed from 2010 to 2015, and published in November 2015.

The objective of the trial was to identify whether, in patients with a systolic blood pressure (SBP) of 130 mm Hg or higher and an increased cardiovascular risk, but without diabetes, treating to a systolic blood pressure target of less than 120 mm Hg is superior to a target of 140 mm Hg. The primary outcome being measured was myocardial infarction, other acute coronary syndromes, stroke, heart failure, or death from cardiovascular causes. The study implies that patients receiving "standard" therapy were controlled similarly to all adults being treated for hypertension and that patients receiving "intensive" therapy had a lower mean SBP compared to all adults being treated for hypertension, but neither conclusion is true when compared to the US National Health and Nutrition Examination Survey.

During the study, 9361 patients were randomly assigned to either a 140 mm Hg target (referred to in the study as standard treatment) or a 120 mm Hg target (intensive treatment). Patients were prescribed blood pressure reducing medications to reach their assigned goal. Unlike normal hypertension treatment, once the goal was reached, prescriptions were suspended until the patient was no longer at goal. After being followed up for a median of 3.26 years, the study showed a significantly lower rate of the primary outcome in the intensive treatment group (1.65% per year) compared to the standard treatment group (2.19% per year). The risk of experiencing a primary outcome (myocardial infarction, other acute coronary syndromes, stroke, heart failure, or death from cardiovascular causes) was 25% lower than in the standard treatment group, and the risk of death from any cause was 27% lower. The number needed to treat with intensive therapy instead of standard therapy to prevent one death was 90. The results were so much more superior for the intensive treatment group that the trial was stopped early.

Although the trial showed that intensive treatment was associated with lower rates of cardiovascular events and death, intensive treatment was also associated with 4% higher rates of serious adverse effects from anti-hypertensive medications, including syncope, electrolyte abnormalities, acute kidney injury or acute renal failure. However, this association was not statistically significant, with a P-value of 0.25, and therefore may have occurred by chance. The intensive treatment group were not found to be at a greater risk of injurious falls or bradycardia, and orthostatic hypotension was less common in the intensive treatment group. The SPRINT study was criticised about the population studied in terms of age, racial and cardiovascular danger
