= Francis P. Facione =

Presiding Bishop (1940–2019)

The Most Reverend Francis P. Facione
- Presiding Bishop of the Old Roman Catholic Church in North America
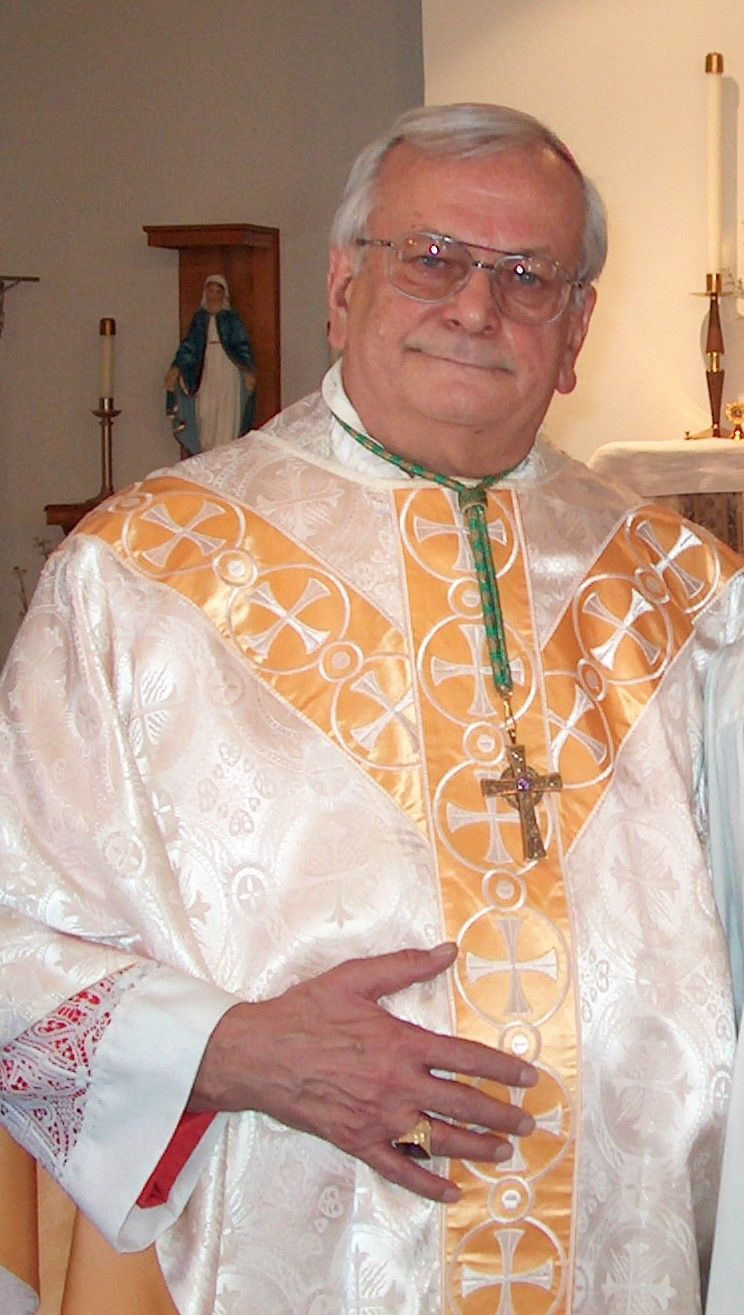
- Facione in 2004
- In office: 1975-2019
- Predecessor: Andrew Gordon Johnston-Cantrell

Orders
- Ordination: July 14, 1974 by Andrew Gordon Johnston-Cantrell
- Consecration: November 30, 1974 by Andrew Gordon Johnston-Cantrell

Personal details
- Born: February 8, 1940 Detroit, Michigan, U.S.
- Died: June 14, 2019 (aged 79) Louisville, Kentucky, U.S.
- Denomination: Old Roman Catholic
- Motto: "Deus Caritas"
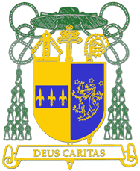
- Coat of arms: The Most Reverend Francis P. Facione's coat of arms

Ordination history of Francis P. Facione
History
Episcopal consecration
- Consecrated by: Bishop Andrew Gordon Johnston-Cantrell
- Date: November 30, 1974
Episcopal succession
Bishops consecrated by Francis P. Facione as principal consecrator
- Joseph Patrick Napurano: April 12, 1975
- Raphael John Adams: February 04, 1989
- Patrick Herbert King: June 5, 1993

Francis Peter Facione (February 8, 1940 – June 14, 2019) was the Presiding Bishop of the Old Roman Catholic Church in North America.

He was born February 8, 1940. Facione studied pharmacy at Wayne State University and earned a BS in Pharmacy in 1962, a MS in Pharmacy Administration in 1974, and a Ph.D. in Pharmacy Administration in 1982. Realizing his vocation, he entered the Old Roman Catholic Church and was ordained priest on July 14, 1974, by Bishop Andrew Gordon Johnston-Cantrell of the Old Roman Catholic Church English Rite (under Archbishop Robert Alfred Burns). He was later consecrated a bishop on November 30, 1974, as the Titular Archbishop of Devon. He was elected on January 5, 1974, as presiding bishop and renamed the church the Old Roman Catholic Church in North America-Ultrajectine Tradition. In 1991 the church moved to Louisville, Kentucky, and was headquartered at St. Mark's Old Roman Catholic Church.

Facione died on June 14, 2019.
