= Oleksandr Filiayev =

Ukrainian footballer (1934–2019)

Personal information
- Full name: Oleksandr Yevhenovych Filiayev
- Date of birth: 26 August 1934
- Place of birth: Losinoostrovsk, Moscow Oblast, Russian SFSR
- Date of death: 21 June 2019 (aged 84)
- Place of death: Lviv, Ukraine
- Position: Striker

Senior career*
Years	Team	Apps	(Gls)
1953	Zenit Moscow	11	(4)
1954–1956	Lokomotiv Moscow	32	(4)
1957–1962	SKA Lviv	174	(50)
1963	Karpaty Lviv	33	(5)
1965	Naftovyk Drohobych	29	(3)

Managerial career
- 1964: Karpaty Lviv (assistant)
- 1965: Naftovyk Drohobych (assistant)
- * Club domestic league appearances and goals

Oleksandr Filiayev (Ukrainian: Олександр Євгенович Філяєв; 26 August 1934 – 21 June 2019) was a Ukrainian professional football player who played as striker and is known as the first captain in the history of FC Karpaty Lviv.

== Playing and coaching career ==
Filiayev played in Moscow clubs' Zenit and Lokomotiv, before transferred to army club in Lviv – SKVO, that after was renamed as SKA. When in 1963 in Lviv was created a new football club Karpaty, he joined it and become the first captain of this club.

He made his debut for Karpaty in the winning game against FC Lokomotiv Gomel on 21 April 1963.

After his retirement he worked as an assistant manager and a teacher of the physical training in the School n6 in Lviv.

He died in Lviv on 21 June 2019.
