= Peter Winterburn =

Canadian academic (died 2019)

Peter Winterburn (died June 21, 2019) was a Canadian academic.

He was the NSERC/AcmeLabs/Bureau Veritas Minerals Industrial Research Chair in Exploration Geochemistry at the University of British Columbia and had recently moved to Chile.

He held a PhD from the University of Edinburgh, Scotland and a BSc from University of Aston, Birmingham, England.

Winterburn was murdered in Valparaíso, Chile in 2019.
