= Platon Gamaleya =

Russian naval officer and navigation scientist (1766–1817)

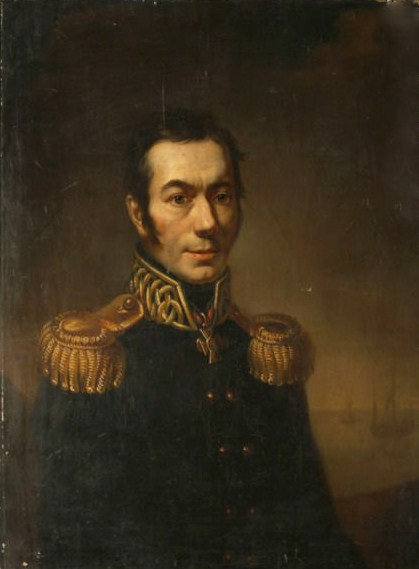
Platon Yakovlevich Gamaleya

Platon Yakovlevich Gamaleya (Ukrainian: Плато́н Я́кович Гамалі́я; 1766–1817) was a Russian naval officer and navigation scientist of Ukrainian origin. Gamaleya Rock, a rock formation in Antarctica, is named after him.
