= Gene Snowden =

American politician (1928–2019)

Mayor of Huntington, Indiana
- In office 1992–1996
- Preceded by: Ronald Schenkel
- Succeeded by: Bob Kyle

Member of the Indiana Senate from the 17th district
- In office November 8, 1972 – August 22, 1983
- Preceded by: Joseph William Harrison
- Succeeded by: Harold "Potch" Hugh Wheeler

Member of the Indiana Senate from the 8th district
- In office November 9, 1966 – November 8, 1972
- Preceded by: Galen Alvin Colclesser
- Succeeded by: John Franklin Shawley

Member of the Indiana House of Representatives from Huntington County
- In office November 4, 1964 – November 9, 1966
- Preceded by: George William Stocksdale
- Succeeded by: Arthur Paul Coblentz

Personal details
- Born: April 7, 1928 Huntington, Indiana, U.S.
- Died: June 10, 2019 (aged 91) Fort Wayne, Indiana, U.S.
- Party: Republican
- Education: Olivet Nazarene College
- Occupation: store manager, insurance/real estate

Gene E. Snowden (April 7, 1928 – June 10, 2019) was an American politician from the state of Indiana. A Republican, he served in the Indiana House of Representatives and Indiana State Senate in a legislative career spanning from 1964 until his resignation in 1983. He was president pro tempore of the Senate from 1979 to 1980. He served as a Huntington, Indiana City Councilman from 1962 to 1964. He was elected County Auditor in 1988 and Mayor in 1992. He lost reelection as Mayor to Bob Kyle in 1995. It was his first election loss. Gene Snowden died on June 10, 2019.
