= Merv Collins =

Canadian football player (1933–2019)

Profile
- Position: Guard

Personal information
- Born: August 10, 1933; Toronto, Ontario, Canada
- Died: June 12, 2019 (aged 85); Ottawa, Ontario, Canada
- Listed height: 6 ft 0 in (1.83 m)
- Listed weight: 245 lb (111 kg)

Career history
- 1953–1954: Toronto Argonauts
- 1955: Hamilton Tiger-Cats
- 1956–1965: Ottawa Rough Riders
- 1966: Edmonton Eskimos

Awards and highlights
- Grey Cup champion (1960)

Mervyn Douglas Collins (August 10, 1933 – June 12, 2019) was a Canadian football player who played for the Toronto Argonauts, Hamilton Tiger-Cats, Ottawa Rough Riders and Edmonton Eskimos. He won the Grey Cup with Ottawa in 1960. He owned a paving company in Toronto and later was a teacher.
