= Nazmul Huda Mintu =

Bangladeshi film director (1942–2019)

- Born: 5 December 1942
- Died: 2 June 2019 (aged 76)
- Occupation: Film director

Nazmul Huda Mintu (5 December 1942 - 2 June 2019) was a Bangladeshi film director. He directed many Dhallywood films.

== Biography ==
Mintu was born on 5 December 1942 in Naogaon. He made his directorial debut in Dhallywood with Surjo Othar Age. He served as general secretary of Bangladesh Film Directors Association from 1989 to 1990. He was the director of Moushumi which film's title was named after Moushumi.

Mintu died in London on 2 June 2019 at the age of 76.

== Selected filmography ==
- Surjo Othar Age
- Chowdhury Bari
- Dak Peon
- Moushumi
- Onek Prem Onek Jwala
- Diner Por Din
- Songhorsho
- Modhumaloti
- Ghore Baire
