= 1974 European Athletics Indoor Championships – Men's 4 × 392 metres relay =

The men's 4 × 396 metres relay event at the 1974 European Athletics Indoor Championships was held on 9 March in Gothenburg. The athletes ran two laps for each leg, like in modern indoor relay races, but because the track was only 196 metres long, it resulted in an unusual distance of 392 metres for each runner.

== Results ==
Rank	Nation	Competitors	Time	Notes
1st place, gold medalist(s)	Sweden	Michael Fredriksson; Gert Möller; Anders Faager; Dimitre Grama	3:04.55	
2nd place, silver medalist(s)	France	Pierre Bonvin; Patrick Salvador; Roger Vélazquez; Lionel Malingre	3:05.46	
