= Tong Daoming =

Chinese literary scholar, translator, and playwright (1937–2019)

- Chinese: 童道明
Transcriptions
Standard Mandarin
- Hanyu Pinyin: Tóng Dàomíng
- IPA: [tʰʊ̌ŋ tâʊ.mǐŋ]

Tong Daoming (Chinese: 童道明; 1937 – 27 June 2019) was a Chinese literary scholar, translator, and playwright, known for his research and translation of the works of the Russian playwright Anton Chekhov. He wrote 13 plays and won the Golden Lion Award, China's highest honour in drama, in 2012.

== Life and career ==
Tong was born in 1937 in Jiangyin, Jiangsu, Republic of China. In 1956, he went to the Soviet Union to study language and literature at Moscow State University. His thesis, On the Symbol of Realism in Chekhov’s Theatre, was highly praised by his advisor, and Chekhov became his main research interest from then on.

In 1962, Tong published on the Wenhui Bao China's first published analysis of the works of German playwright Bertolt Brecht. From 1963, he worked at the Institute of Foreign Literature at the Chinese Academy of Sciences (later Chinese Academy of Social Sciences). He translated many of Chekhov's works into Chinese, including The Seagull, The Cherry Orchard, Uncle Vanya, and Platonov, and published critical analyses on them. Recognized as China's top authority on Chekhov, he was awarded a special pension by the State Council of the People's Republic of China.

In 1996, to celebrate the centenary of the publication of The Seagull, Tong wrote his first play I Am the Seagull (我是海鸥). To celebrate the 100th birthday of Feng Zhi, another author Tong admired, he wrote his second play Face Mold of a Girl by the Seine River (塞纳河少女的面模) in 2005. In 2012, he won the Golden Lion Award, China's highest honour in drama, together with Mo Yan and He Jiping. In 2016, his play Three Drops of Water, a tribute to Victor Rozov's Four Drops of Water, was well received at the 7th Beijing Nanluoguxiang Performing Arts Festival.

Tong wrote 103 dramas in total. A major characteristic of his plays is the lack of antagonists, which Tong attributed to the influence of Chekhov.

== Death ==
On 25 June 2019, Tong fell ill and was hospitalized at the China-Japan Friendship Hospital in Beijing. He died two days later at the age of 82.
