= Evangelina García Prince =

Venezuelan activist, politician, and academic (1934–2019)

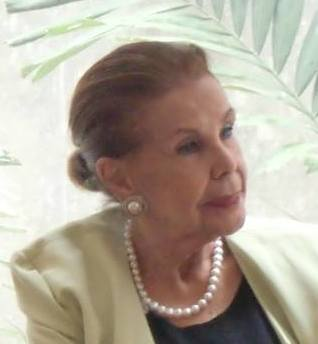
García Prince in 2014

Evangelina García Prince (30 September 1934 – 3 June 2019) was a Venezuelan women's rights activist, politician, and academic. She served as a Senator and was a member of the Comisión para la Reforma del Estado (COPRE), a presidential commission.
