= Ray Rigby (politician) =

American politician (1923–2019)

Member of the Idaho Senate from the 34 district
- In office 1965–1974
- Preceded by: Dick Smith
- Succeeded by: _

Personal details
- Born: April 16, 1923 Rexburg, Idaho
- Died: June 12, 2019 (aged 96)
- Spouse: Lola
- Education: University of Idaho
- Profession: Lawyer

Ray Rigby (April 16, 1923 – June 12, 2019) was a Democratic Idaho State Senator from 1965 to 1972, representing District 34. He previously served for 14 years as Prosecuting Attorney for Madison County, Idaho.

== Early life and career ==
Rigby was a native of the Upper Snake River Valley in Eastern Idaho. Through his involvement in the Madison High School 4-H club, he won his district's and then regional public speaking contests earning a $100 scholarship from Sears Roebuck and Co which he used to attend the University of Idaho. The attack on Pearl Harbor occurred during his first year of college and resulted in him enlisted in the United States Air Corps. It was during a furlough that he returned and married his wife Lola. After a couple years in the service, Rigby returned to the University of Idaho to earn his Bachelor's and law degrees.

Upon gradation in 1950, Rigby was quickly elected as the Prosecuting Attorney for Madison County, Idaho and founded his private practice that exists today. In 1965, Rigby ran for the Idaho State Senate and won. During his Senate tenure, Rigby sat on the Judiciary and the Resources and Environment Committees as well as served as the Senate Assistant Minority Leader from 1967 to 1970. He was re-elected to the Senate three more times before leaving to return to his practice. He took one more shot at public service in 1974 when he ran for the Democratic nomination for Idaho Lt. Governor, losing to John V. Evans.

Throughout his life, Rigby has devoted much of his time to serving his church, the Church of Jesus Christ of Latter-Day Saints in numerous capacities such as Bishop, Stake President and Patriarch. He died on June 12, 2019, at the age of 96.

== Awards ==
- Idaho's Most Outstanding Freshman Senator by the Idaho Press Club
- Idaho's Most Outstanding Legislator by the Idaho Veterans of Foreign Wars
- Professionalism Award by the Idaho State Bar (1995)
- Distinguished Lawyer Award by the Idaho State Bar (2001)
- 60-Year Attorney Award by the Idaho State Bar (2010)
- 65-Year Attorney Award by the Idaho State Bar (2015)
