= Dick Sedar =

American politician (1931–2019)

Member of the Wyoming Senate
- In office 1969–1985

Personal details
- Born: March 27, 1931 Casper, Wyoming, U.S.
- Died: June 6, 2019 (aged 88) Casper, Wyoming, U.S.
- Party: Democratic
- Spouse: Virginia Sedar
- Occupation: lawyer

Dick Richard Sedar (March 27, 1931 - June 6, 2019) was an American politician in the state of Wyoming. He served in the Wyoming House of Representatives as a member of the Democratic Party. He attended the University of Wyoming and was a businessman.
