= Boris Gamaleya =

French poet from Réunion (1930–2019)

Boris Gamaleya (18 December 1930 St. Louis – 30 June 2019) was a Réunion poet, literary critic, linguist, folklorist, and social activist. He primarily wrote in French.

== Biography ==
His father was Ukrainian a descendant of Cossack Hetman Petro Doroshenko, who fled Russia after the October Revolution and died when Boris was still young. His mother was a Réunion-born créole of distantly Portuguese decent. He grew up in mountain village of Makes in the home of his grandparents. He was first published in local newspapers in Réunion.

In 1950, he began higher education in France but left the Ecole Normale d'Instituteurs in Avignon for the university town of Aix-en-Provence in 1951 where he joined the French Communist Party.

Upon his return to the island in 1955 with his wife Clélie, a literature teacher, he taught French, published poems and essays in the press and began collecting Reunionese oral culture. He joined the Communist Party of Reunion (PCR) in 1959. In 1960 the Debré ordinance transferred any public-sector workers, including teachers, suspected of "disrupting public order" out of Réunion to Metropolitan France and Gamaleya was sent to Paris. He would not return to Réunion for twelve years. During his exile in European France, he obtained a license in Russian at the Sorbonne, joined the Union générale des travailleurs réunionnais en France and wrote for its revue.

After 1980 he broke from the PCR and with activism. His writing at this time shifted to geopoetics that focused on the nature and culture of the Indian Ocean islands. Some of his is poems were translated into Ukrainian at this time by Victor Koptilov and published in the magazine The Universe (1981) and the anthology The Poetry of Africa (1983).

In 1997 he wrote a poetic novel L’île du Tsarévitch (Island of the Tsarevich) exploring his Slavic origins and Eastern Orthodox faith as well as the fate of his father. In 1998 he was commissioned by French authorities to create a work to mark the 150th anniversary of the abolition of slavery in France. He produced the oratorio entitled Ombline, ou le volcan à l’envers with a libretto based on one of his plays.

He was a member of the Central Committee of the Communist Party of Reunion.
