= Gateway High School (San Francisco) =

Location
- 1430 Scott Street; San Francisco, California; United States; 37.78316°N 122.43751°W

Information
- Motto: Step Up, Do Right, Dream Big
- Established: 1998
- Principal: Becca Wieder, Stephanie Khaziran
- Faculty: 38
- Enrollment: 489 (2014-15)
- Campus: Urban
- Team name: Gators
- Website: gatewaypublicschools.org/ghs

Gateway High School is a charter school located in San Francisco, California. It was founded in September 1998. For many years, it resided in the Sunset District at Laguna Honda before moving to its permanent location, at the corner of Geary and Scott, in the building that formerly housed Benjamin Franklin Middle School. The building is also shared with the KIPP SF Bay Academy, a 5th-8th grade charter school.

Gateway focuses on small class sizes, high standards, and a close student-to-faculty relationship. The school has been designated as a California Distinguished School and as a 21st Century School of Distinction. It has also been officially nominated by the United States Department of Education in December 2006 as one of eight acclaimed charter schools in the nation. As of September 2017, it is the third highest ranked public school in English standardized testing scores San Francisco, and in June 2009, Newsweek ranked it as one of "America's Top Public High Schools" .

== Education ==
Gateway runs as a college preparatory, liberal arts education high school. In their first year, freshmen take an introductory seminar course. Students are required to take 2 years of art, compared to the normal 1 year required by California Third Level Institutions. Students are expected to fulfill their own PE requirement, however PE classes are offered. A number of Posse Scholars have attended Gateway.

== Demographics ==
White	Latino	Asian	African American	Pacific Islander	American Indian	Two or More Races
26%	50%	15%	18%	0.4%	0%	8%

According to U.S. News & World Report, 74% of Gateway's student body is "of color," with 40% of the student body coming from an economically disadvantaged household, determined by student eligibility for California's Reduced-price meal program.

== See also ==
- San Francisco County high schools
- Aim High Academy
