= Karen B. Johnson =

American politician and activist (1942–2019)

Karen Johnson

Mayor of Schenectady, New York
- In office 1983–1991
- Preceded by: Frank Duci
- Succeeded by: Frank Duci

Personal details
- Born: Karen Brown; May 12, 1942 Buffalo, New York
- Died: June 10, 2019 (aged 77)
- Party: Democratic Party
- Children: Two
- Education: Radcliffe College; Rensselaer Polytechnic Institute

Karen B. Johnson (May 12, 1942 – June 10, 2019) was an American politician and activist who served as the mayor of Schenectady, New York, from 1983 to 1991. Johnson became the first woman to be elected to the Schenectady City Council in 1975 and the first female Mayor of Schenectady in 1983. She remains the first and only woman ever to serve as Schenectady's mayor in history.
