= Pierre Mambele =

Congolese taxi driver (1945–2019)

- Mambele in 1997
- Born: 1945; Kisangani, Belgian Congo
- Died: 8 June 2019 (aged 74)
- Occupation: Taxi driver

Pierre Mambele (1945 – 8 June 2019) was a Congolese taxi driver working in Kinshasa, capital of the Democratic Republic of the Congo. He became well known amongst Western journalists as a companion and guide who could take them towards the action and provide contacts for stories. As a result, he subsequently featured in a BBC World Service program.

== Career ==
Mambele was born in the city of Kisangani, during Belgian colonial rule, in 1945. His parents died when he was nine, and Mambele moved to Kinshasa where he experienced the sudden independence of the Congo from Belgium in 1960. In 1974, he became a taxi driver. That year, Kinshasa was host to the boxing event The Rumble in the Jungle, and during the festivities Mambele "refereed" an impromptu spar between Muhammad Ali and another taxi driver.

During the 1990s, Kinshasa experienced significant political violence and Mambele chauffeured foreign journalists covering the riots. On one occasion, Mambele and his passengers were stopped at gunpoint and beaten, but Mambele returned to work on the same day. In another incident, Mambele and his taxi carrying several journalists were stopped by an angry mob, causing Mambele to leave the vehicle and "[lecture] the young men on the need to respect him". He developed contacts with the country's elites and officials through his confidence, and Mambele was recognized to an extent by the officials due to him often carrying Western journalists. He earned around US$35 per day during this period. Mambele spoke Swahili and Lingala, but did not speak English and had a thick accent when speaking French.

Michela Wrong (Reuters), who worked with Mambele during the 1990s, described him as having "balls of steel". Howard W. French, then writing for the New York Times, described Mambele as making "Zaire-Congo liveable and even survivable during long, brutal stretches when it sometimes seemed anything but". He tended to push his journalist clients towards the action and actively suggested ideas and contacts for stories. Mambele was featured in BBC World Service's "A Day in the Life" program in December 2002, where he was introduced as a driver "whose passengers read like a Who's Who of Congolese politics".

== Death ==
He died on 8 June 2019, at the age of 74. In his obituary, Reuters described him as having "played a unique part in shaping coverage from the Democratic Republic of Congo".
