= 2019 in Australia =

- Monarch: Elizabeth II
- Governor-General: Sir Peter Cosgrove, then David Hurley
- Prime minister: Scott Morrison
- Australian of the Year: Craig Challen and Richard Harris
- Elections: NSW, Federal

The following lists events that happened during 2019 in Australia.

- Decades: 1990s; 2000s; 2010s; 2020s; 2030s
- See also: 2019 in Australian television; 2019 in Australian literature; Other events of 2019; Federal election; Timeline of Australian history

== Incumbents ==
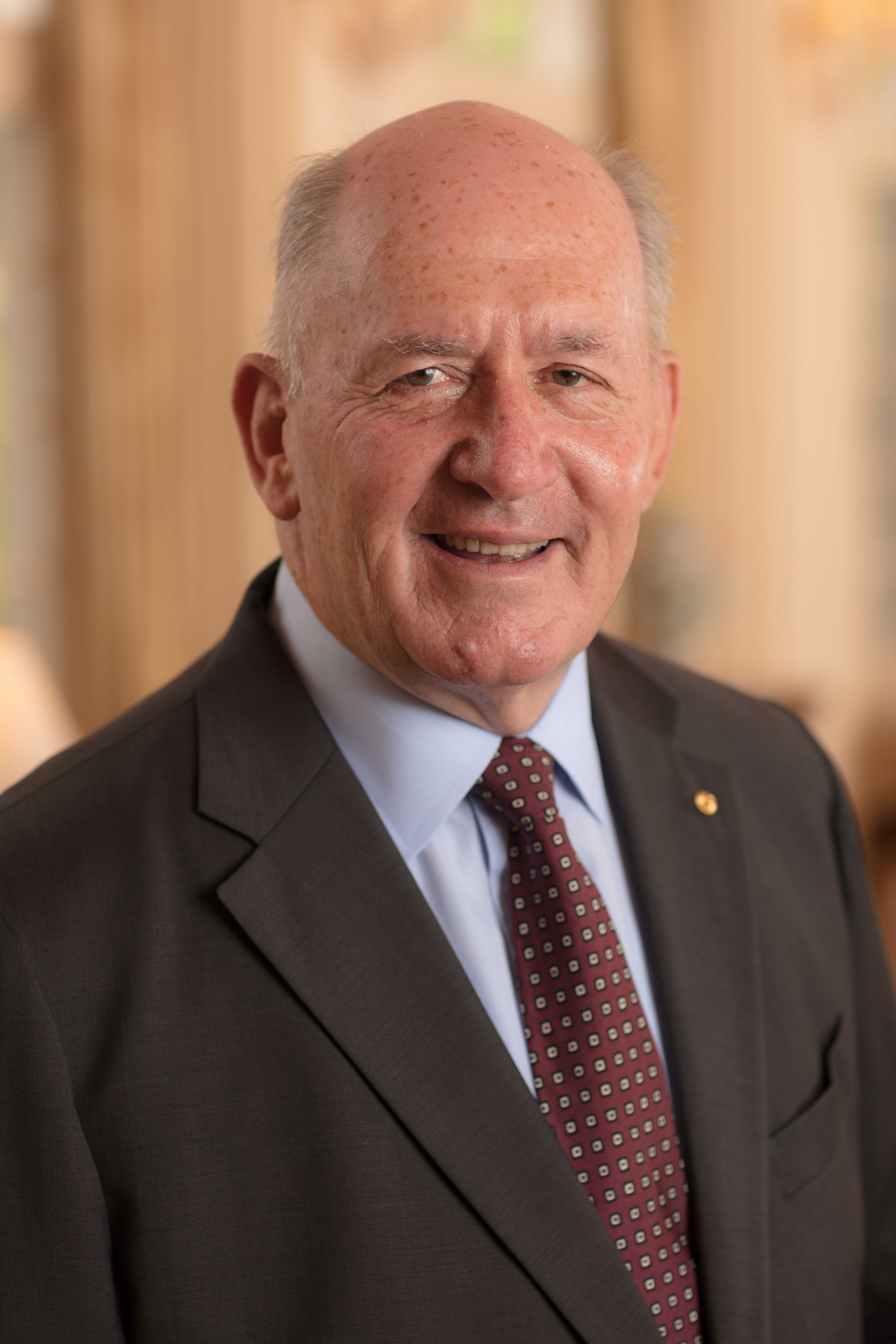
Sir Peter Cosgrove

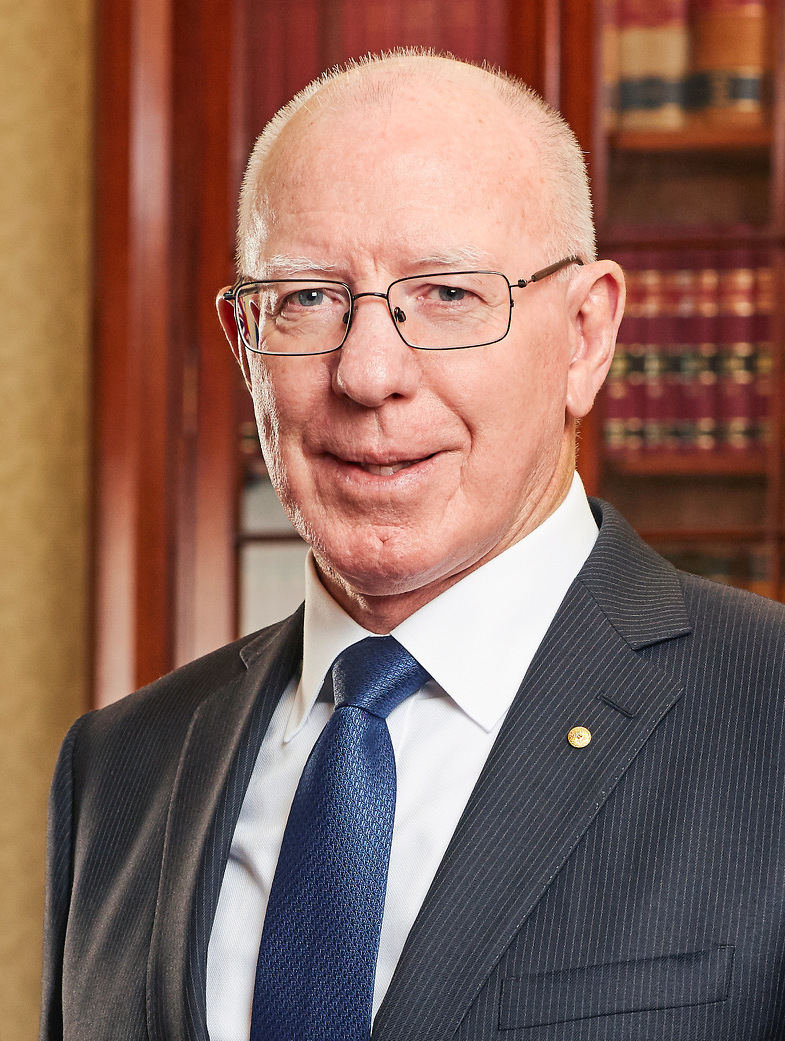
David Hurley

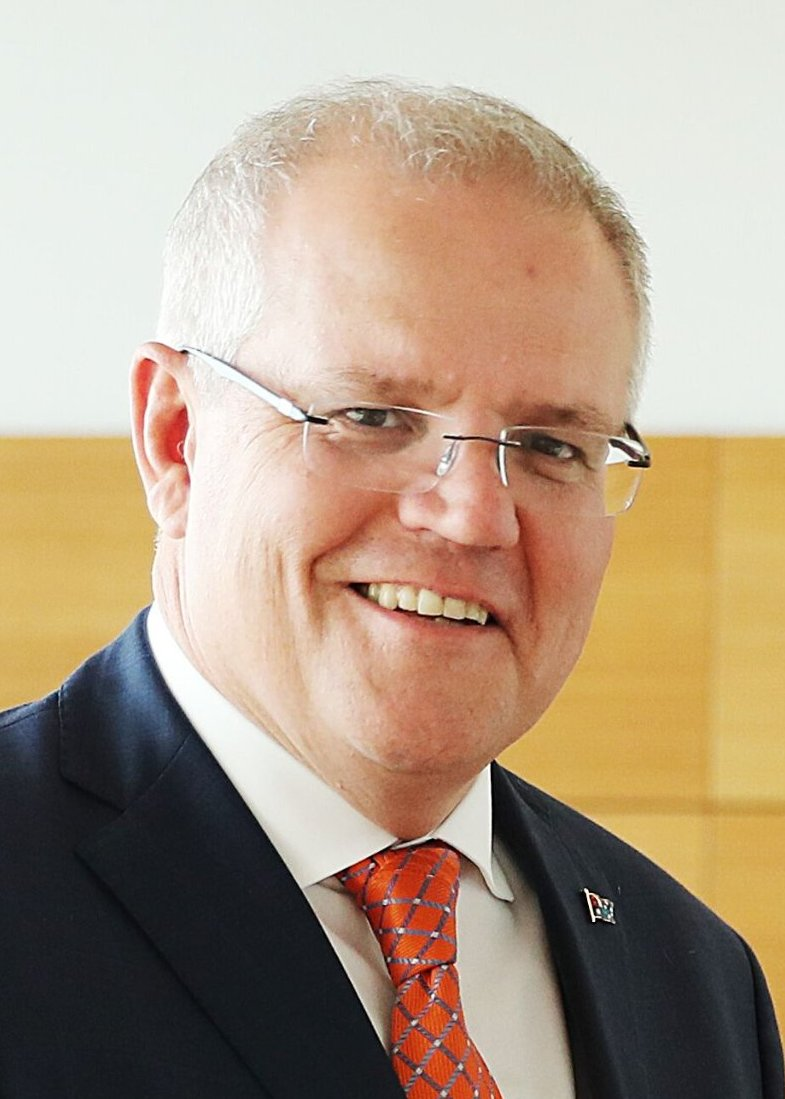
Scott Morrison

- Monarch – Elizabeth II
- Governor-General – Sir Peter Cosgrove (until 1 July), then David Hurley
- Prime Minister – Scott Morrison
  - Deputy Prime Minister – Michael McCormack
  - Opposition Leader – Bill Shorten (until 30 May), then Anthony Albanese
- Chief Justice – Susan Kiefel

=== State and territory leaders ===
- Premier of New South Wales – Gladys Berejiklian
  - Opposition Leader – Michael Daley (until 25 March), then Penny Sharpe (until 29 June), then Jodi McKay
- Premier of Queensland – Annastacia Palaszczuk
  - Opposition Leader – Deb Frecklington
- Premier of South Australia – Steven Marshall
  - Opposition Leader – Peter Malinauskas
- Premier of Tasmania – Will Hodgman
  - Opposition Leader – Rebecca White
- Premier of Victoria – Daniel Andrews
  - Opposition Leader – Michael O'Brien
- Premier of Western Australia – Mark McGowan
  - Opposition Leader – Mike Nahan (until 13 June), then Liza Harvey
- Chief Minister of the Australian Capital Territory – Andrew Barr
  - Opposition Leader – Alistair Coe
- Chief Minister of the Northern Territory – Michael Gunner
  - Opposition Leader – Gary Higgins

=== Governors and administrators ===
- Governor of New South Wales – David Hurley (until 1 May), then Margaret Beazley
- Governor of Queensland – Paul de Jersey
- Governor of South Australia – Hieu Van Le
- Governor of Tasmania – Kate Warner
- Governor of Victoria – Linda Dessau
- Governor of Western Australia – Kim Beazley
- Administrator of the Australian Indian Ocean Territories – Natasha Griggs
- Administrator of Norfolk Island – Eric Hutchinson
- Administrator of the Northern Territory – Vicki O'Halloran

== Events ==
=== January ===
- 3 January – One man is killed and another is injured following a double stabbing at the Asia-Pacific headquarters of the Church of Scientology in the Sydney suburb of Chatswood.
- 5 January – A far-right political rally held in Melbourne, marked by scuffles with police and counter-protesters, is attended by Independent Senator Fraser Anning, who admits to using tax-payer funded travel to attend the event.
- 7 January – A mass fish die-off occurs on the Lower Darling River at Menindee Lakes. Up to 1 million fish, including endangered species, ultimately die in what is described as possibly the largest fish die-off in Australian history.
- 24 January – Professor Tanya Monro is appointed Australia's next Chief Defence Scientist, the first woman in the position.
- 29 January – The South Australian Murray Darling Basin Royal Commission report is released. The commission, which commenced in 2018, was critical of the Murray Darling Basin Plan and the Commonwealth Murray Darling Basin Authority.

=== February ===
- Four people are killed and over a thousand people remain evacuated from homes in Townsville as flooding peaks in the city, following a metre of rainfall in the first week of the month. Among the dead were two men on 4 February, and two young boys on 25 February, all from drowning.
- 4 February – The Royal Commission into Misconduct in the Banking, Superannuation and Financial Services Industry final report is tabled in Parliament. The report makes 76 recommendations.
- 12 February – The Liberal-National Coalition government becomes the first Australian federal government to lose a vote on its own legislation in 78 years, after a defeat on the floor of the House of Representatives.
- 13 February – Nineteen homes are destroyed by bushfires in the New England and Northern Rivers regions of New South Wales.
- 26 February – Following the lifting of a suppression order, it is revealed that Cardinal George Pell had been convicted in December 2018 of sexually abusing two choirboys in 1996.

=== March ===
- 13 March – Cardinal George Pell is sentenced to six years in prison following his conviction over the sexual abuse of two choirboys.
- 19 March – a few days prior to the state election, a video from September 2018 surfaced in which NSW Labor leader Michael Daley made comments about Asian immigration in Sydney. Daley said "Our young children will flee and who are they being replaced with? They are being replaced by young people from typically Asia with PhDs," and "So there's a transformation happening in Sydney now where our kids are moving out and foreigners are moving in and taking their jobs".
- 23 March –
  - The Liberal-National Coalition government led by Gladys Berejiklian wins the 2019 New South Wales state election and returns to office with a reduced majority.
  - Tropical Cyclone Trevor makes landfall in the Northern Territory.

=== April ===
- 11 April – Actor Geoffrey Rush is awarded $850,000 in damages after winning a defamation case against The Daily Telegraph.
- 12–14 April – After 25 years, Australia's Dirt n Dust Festival is held for the final time at Julia Creek, Queensland. Although scheduled for 2020 and 2021, those events were cancelled due to the COVID-19 pandemic. It was announced in 2021 that the festival had been permanently cancelled due to a lack of volunteers.

=== May ===
- 16 May – Bob Hawke, Australia's 23rd Prime Minister, dies at the age of 89.
- 18 May – 2019 Australian federal election: Scott Morrison's Liberal/National Coalition government is narrowly re-elected, defeating the Labor Party led by Bill Shorten.
- 26 May – The Sydney Metro is opened from Tallawong to Chatswood.
- 30 May – Anthony Albanese is elected unopposed as leader of the Australian Labor Party and Leader of the Opposition, replacing Bill Shorten. Richard Marles is elected deputy unopposed, succeeding Tanya Plibersek

=== June ===
- 4 June – At least four men are killed and a woman is injured after a 45-year-old gunman allegedly goes on a shooting spree in the city centre of Darwin, Northern Territory.
- 4–5 June – The Australian Federal Police raid the home of News Corp Australia journalist Annika Smethurst and the headquarters of the ABC over national security and special forces stories.
- 24 June – Parts of the Darwin CBD are evacuated after the city is impacted by a 7.2 magnitude earthquake originating in Indonesia.

=== July ===
- 1 July – David Hurley is sworn in as the 27th Governor-General of Australia.
- 8–27 July – A biennial joint Australia-United States military exercise Talisman Saber 2019 is held.

=== August ===
- 13 August – 2019 Sydney stabbing attack
- 16 August – Pro-Hong Kong protesters clash with pro-China supporters in Melbourne, while police are forced to intervene during similar confrontations in Sydney and Adelaide, following the 2019–20 Hong Kong protests.
- 21 August – The Victorian Court of Appeal dismisses George Pell's appeal to overturn his conviction for child sex offences.
- 29 August – An attempt to deport the Sri Lankan Tamil Nadesalingam family asylum seekers was thwarted by a last-minute injunction, forcing the plane carrying the couple and their children out of Australia to land in Darwin.

=== September ===
- 9 September – Homes and buildings, including the historic Binna Burra Lodge, are destroyed by a bushfire in Queensland's Scenic Rim region.

=== October ===
- 26 October – Climbing Uluru is banned by authority of the Uluṟu-Kata Tjuṯa National Park board.
- 31 October – The Royal Commission into Aged Care Quality and Safety interim report is published and tabled in Parliament.

=== November ===
- 8 November – Three people are killed and 150 homes are destroyed by a large number of bushfires burning across New South Wales and South East Queensland.
- 11 November – A week-long State of Emergency is declared in New South Wales and the Australian Defence Force is put on alert amid mounting bushfire warnings.

=== December ===
- 30–31 December – Eight people are killed, hundreds of homes are destroyed and the Royal Australian Navy is mobilised to assist evacuation efforts following bushfires on the New South Wales South Coast and in Victoria's East Gippsland

== Music, arts and literature ==
- 10 May – Tony Costa wins the Archibald Prize for his portrait of artist Lindy Lee.
- 30 July – Melissa Lucashenko wins the Miles Franklin Award for Too Much Lip

== Sport ==
=== January ===
- 5 January – Tennis: The Swiss team consisting of Roger Federer and Belinda Bencic defeat Germany 2–1 in the final of the 2018 Hopman Cup.
- 26 January –
  - Cricket: Brisbane Heat defeat Sydney Sixers by 3 wickets at Drummoyne Oval in Sydney in the final of the 2018–19 Women's Big Bash League season.
  - Tennis: Naomi Osaka defeats Petra Kvitová 7–6 (7–2), 5–7, 6–4 at Melbourne Park in the final of the 2019 Australian Open women's singles.
- 27 January – Tennis: Novak Djokovic defeats Rafael Nadal 6–3, 6–2, 6–3 at Melbourne Park in the final of the 2019 Australian Open men's singles.

=== February ===
- 15 February —
  - Rugby league: The Indigenous All Stars defeat the Māori All Stars 34–14 in the 2019 All Stars match. Indigenous halfback Tyrone Roberts, of the Gold Coast Titans, wins the Preston Campbell medal for Man of the Match.
  - Rugby league: The Māori Women's All Stars defeat the Indigenous Women's All Stars 8–4 in the 2019 Women's All Stars match.
- 16 February –
  - Association football: Sydney FC defeats Perth Glory 4–2 at Jubilee Oval, Sydney to win the 2019 W-League Grand Final.
  - Basketball: Canberra Capitals defeat Adelaide Lightning 93–73 to win the 2018–19 WNBL series in the third game of the grand final series at AIS Arena in Canberra.
- 17 February –
  - Cricket: Melbourne Renegades defeat Melbourne Stars by 13 runs to win the 2018–19 Big Bash League season.
  - Rugby league: 2018 NRL premiers Sydney Roosters defeat Super League XXIII champions Wigan Warriors 20–8 in the 2019 World Club Challenge, held at DW Stadium in Wigan.

=== March ===
- 17 March –
  - Basketball: Perth Wildcats defeat Melbourne United 97–82 to win the 2018–19 NBL series in the fourth game of the grand final series at Melbourne Arena.
  - Motorsport: Mercedes driver Valtteri Bottas wins the 2019 Australian Grand Prix at Albert Park in Melbourne from Mercedes teammate Lewis Hamilton and Red Bull's Max Verstappen.
- 31 March – Australian rules football: Adelaide wins the 2019 AFL Women's Grand Final, defeating Carlton 10.3 (63) to 2.6 (18).

=== May ===
- 19 May –
  - Association Football: Sydney FC defeat Perth Glory 0(4) to 0 (1) on penalties to claim the 2018-19 A-League season at Perth's Optus Stadium. It's the 4th A League title win for Sydney FC.

=== June ===
- 5 June – Rugby league: Queensland defeat New South Wales 18–14 at Suncorp Stadium in the first match of the 2019 State of Origin series. Queensland winger Dane Gagai is awarded man of the match.
- 23 June –
  - Golf: Hannah Green wins the 2019 Women's PGA Championship.
  - Tennis: Ashleigh Barty wins the 2019 Birmingham Classic, becoming the No. 1 ranked WTA tennis player.
  - Rugby league: New South Wales defeat Queensland 38–6 at Optus Stadium in the second match of the 2019 State of Origin series. NSW prop Jake Trbojevic is awarded man of the match.
- 24 June – Surfing: Sally Fitzgibbons is ranked No. 1 in women's surfing after winning the Rio Pro in Brazil.

=== July ===
- 10 July – Rugby league: New South Wales win the 2019 State of Origin series, defeating Queensland 26–20 at ANZ Stadium in the third match. NSW fullback James Tedesco is awarded both man of the match and the Wally Lewis Medal for player of the series.

=== August ===
- 29 August 2019 - Rugby league: After 25 seasons, the final NRL game is played at Willows Sports Complex in Townsville when more than 15,000 spectators watch the North Queensland Cowboys beat the Canterbury Bankstown Bulldogs.

=== September ===
- 8 September – Rugby league: Melbourne Storm win the minor premiership following the final main round of the 2019 NRL season. Gold Coast Titans finish in last position, claiming the wooden spoon.
- 9 September – Cricket: At Old Trafford, Australia defeats England in the fourth Test of the 2019 Ashes series thereby retaining The Ashes.
- 28 September – Australian rules football: Richmond defeats Greater Western Sydney 17.12 (114) to 3.7 (25), winning the 2019 AFL Grand Final.
- 29 September – Surfing: Mitch Parkinson wins the So Sri Lanka Pro 2019 as a part of the World Surf League, his first career WSL title.

=== October ===
- 6 October –
  - Rugby league: Sydney Roosters defeat Canberra Raiders 14–8 to win the 2019 NRL Grand Final at ANZ Stadium, becoming the first team since 1992/1993 to win back to back rugby league titles. Raiders five-eighth Jack Wighton is awarded the Clive Churchill Medal for Man of the Match. Pre-match entertainment is headlined by American pop rock band OneRepublic, featuring Thandi Phoenix, while Daryl Braithwaite performs at halftime.
  - Rugby league: Brisbane Broncos defeat St. George Illawarra Dragons 30–6 in the NRL Women's Premiership Grand Final, winning the title for the second year in a row.

=== November ===
- 5 November – Horse racing: Vow And Declare wins the 2019 Melbourne Cup.

== Deaths ==
=== January ===
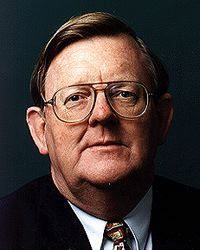
Paul Neville

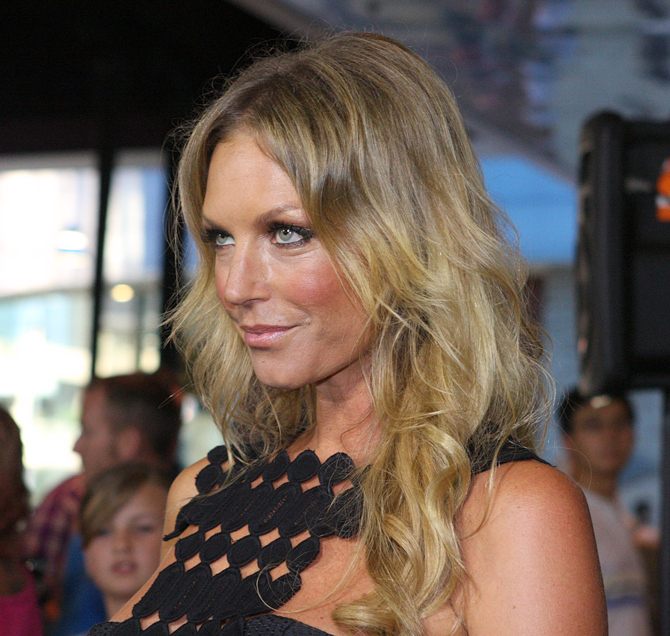
Annalise Braakensiek

- 1 January – Paul Neville, Queensland politician (b. 1940)
- 2 January – Darius Perkins, actor (b. 1964)
- 4 January – John Thornett, rugby union player (b. 1935)
- 6 January – Annalise Braakensiek, model (b. 1972)
- 7 January – Jimmy Hannan, television presenter (b. 1934)
- 8 January – Sir William Cole, public servant (b. 1926)
- 16 January – Chris Wilson, blues musician (b. 1956)
- 17 January – Tara Simmons, musician (b. 1984)
- 19 January – Robert Furlonger, diplomat and public servant (b. 1921)
- 20 January – Fred Castledine, Australian rules footballer (b. 1937)
- 22 January – Eileen Massey, cricketer (b. 1935)
- 24 January – Jim McCabe, Victorian politician (b. 1922)
- 29 January – Ian George, Anglican bishop (b. 1934)
- 30 January
  - Maureen Brunt, economist (b. 1928)
  - Alan Hayes, Australian rules footballer (Richmond) (b. 1939)

=== February ===
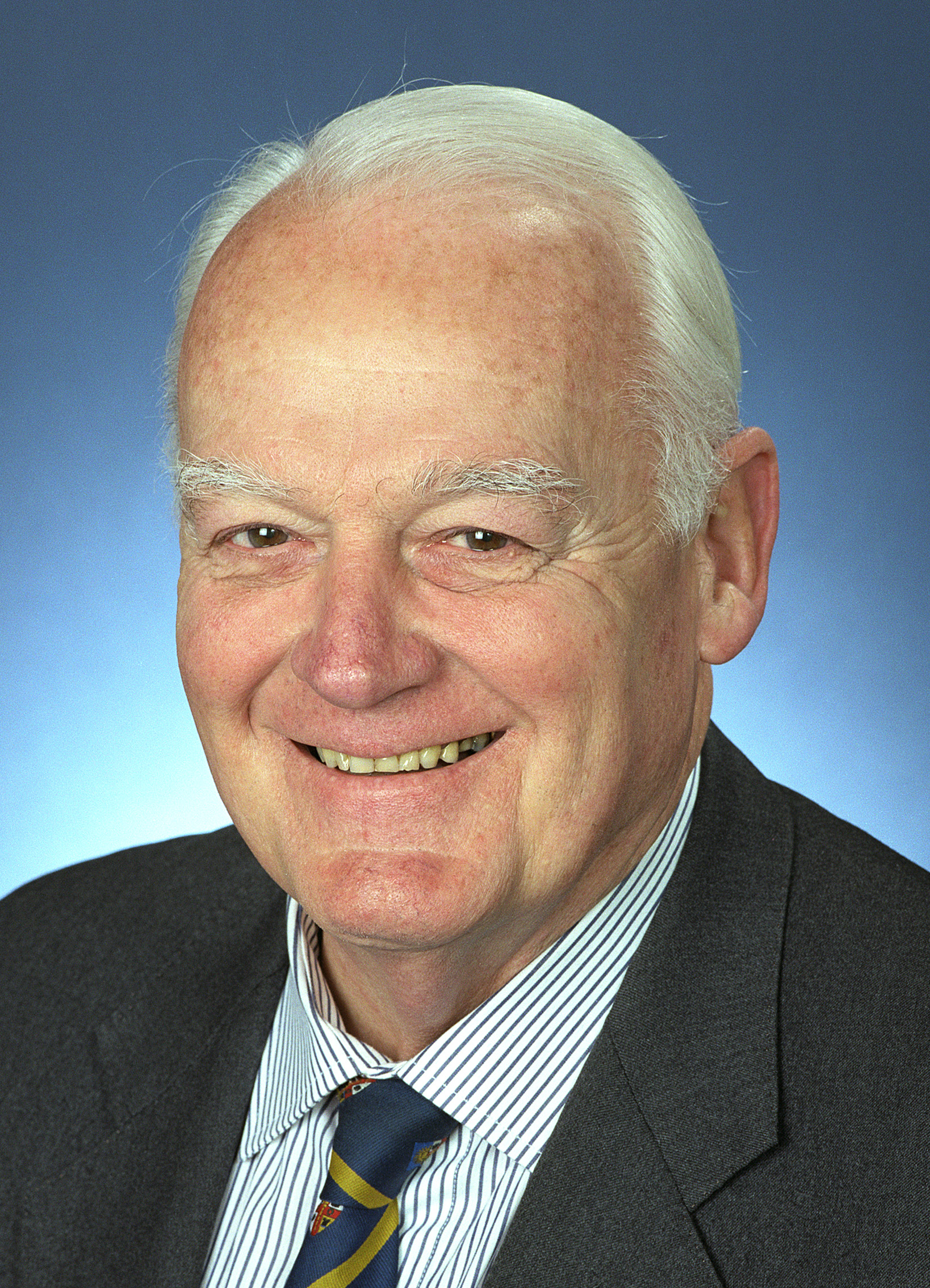
John Herron

- 1 February – Andrew McGahan, novelist (b. 1966)
- 3 February
  - Carmen Duncan, actor (b. 1942)
  - John Sinclair, conservationist (b. 1939)
- 9 February – Barney Cooney, Victorian politician (b. 1934)
- 11 February – Jeffrey Miles, Australian Capital Territory Supreme Court Chief Justice (b. 1935)
- 13 February – Leonard Casley, self-proclaimed monarch of the Principality of Hutt River (b. 1925)
- 21 February – Sir Rupert Myers, metallurgist and university administrator (b. 1921)
- 24 February
  - Paul Blackwell, actor (b. 1954)
  - Philip Cummins, Victorian Supreme Court judge (b. 1939)
  - Dame Margaret Scott, ballet dancer (b. 1922)
- 25 February – John Herron, Queensland politician and diplomat (b. 1932)
- 27 February
  - Bill Landeryou, Victorian politician and union official (b. 1941)
  - Milton Morris, New South Wales politician (b. 1924)
- 28 February – Bruce Rosier, Anglican bishop (b. 1928)

=== March ===
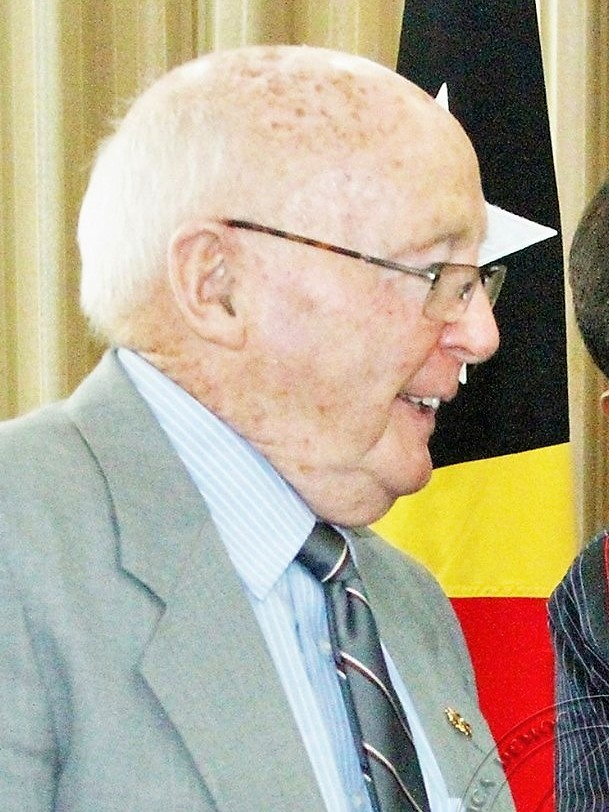
Gordon McIntosh

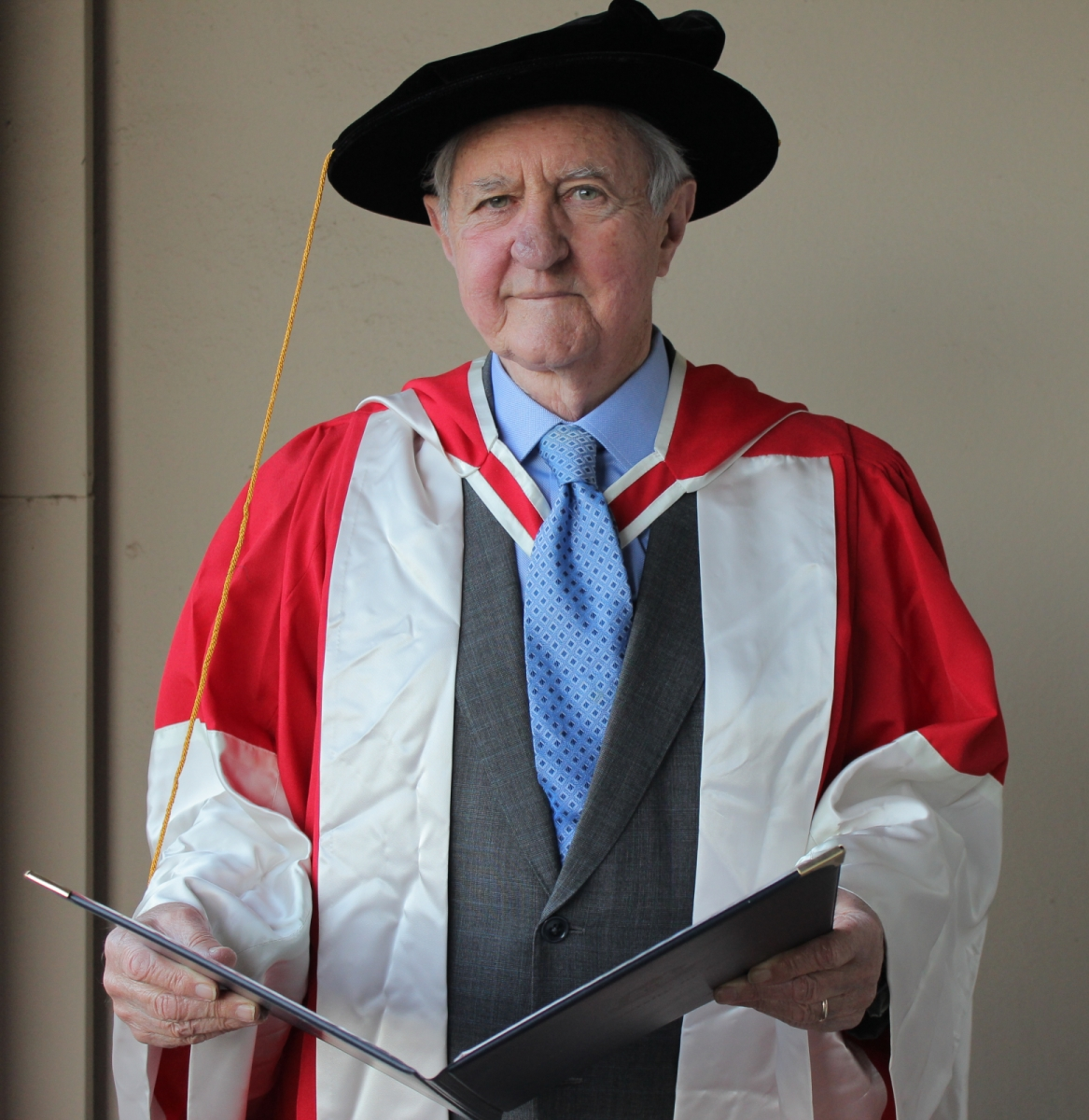
Peter Coleman

- 1 March – Mike Willesee, television journalist (b. 1942)
- 3 March – Richard Lewis, Western Australian politician (b. 1939)
- 4 March – Les Carlyon, newspaper editor (b. 1942)
- 10 March – Gordon McIntosh, Western Australian politician (b. 1925)
- 11 March – Desmond Ford, theologian (b. 1929)
- 12 March – Thelma McKenzie, cricketer (b. 1915)
- 13 March – Edmund Capon, art historian (died in the United Kingdom) (b. 1940)
- 18 March – Giovanni Sgro, Victorian politician (b. 1931)
- 19 March
  - Lance Oswald, Australian rules footballer (St Kilda) (b. 1937)
  - Ian Thorogood, Australian rules footballer (Carlton) and coach (b. 1936)
  - Kenneth To, swimmer (b. 1992)
- 20 March – Noel Hush, chemist (b. 1924)
- 22 March – Jack Absalom, artist, author and adventurer (b. 1927)
- 24 March – Vicky Kippin, Queensland politician (b. 1942)
- 25 March – Stylianos Harkianakis, Greek Orthodox Archbishop of Australia (b. 1935)
- 27 March – Bruce Yardley, Test cricketer (b. 1947)
- 30 March – Geoff Harvey, musician and television personality (b. 1935)
- 31 March – Peter Coleman, 30th New South Wales Leader of the Opposition (b. 1928)

=== April ===
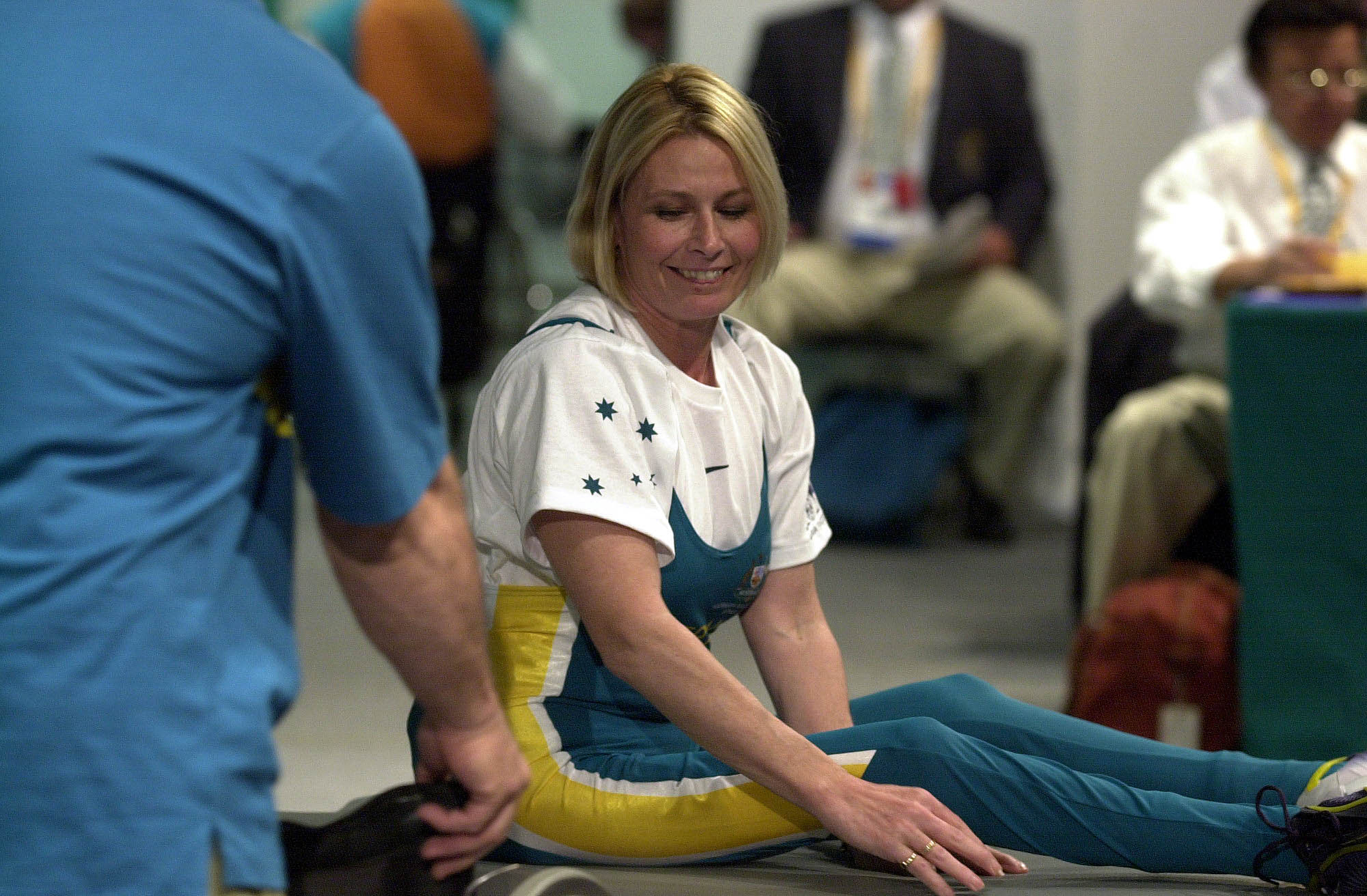
Suzanne Twelftree

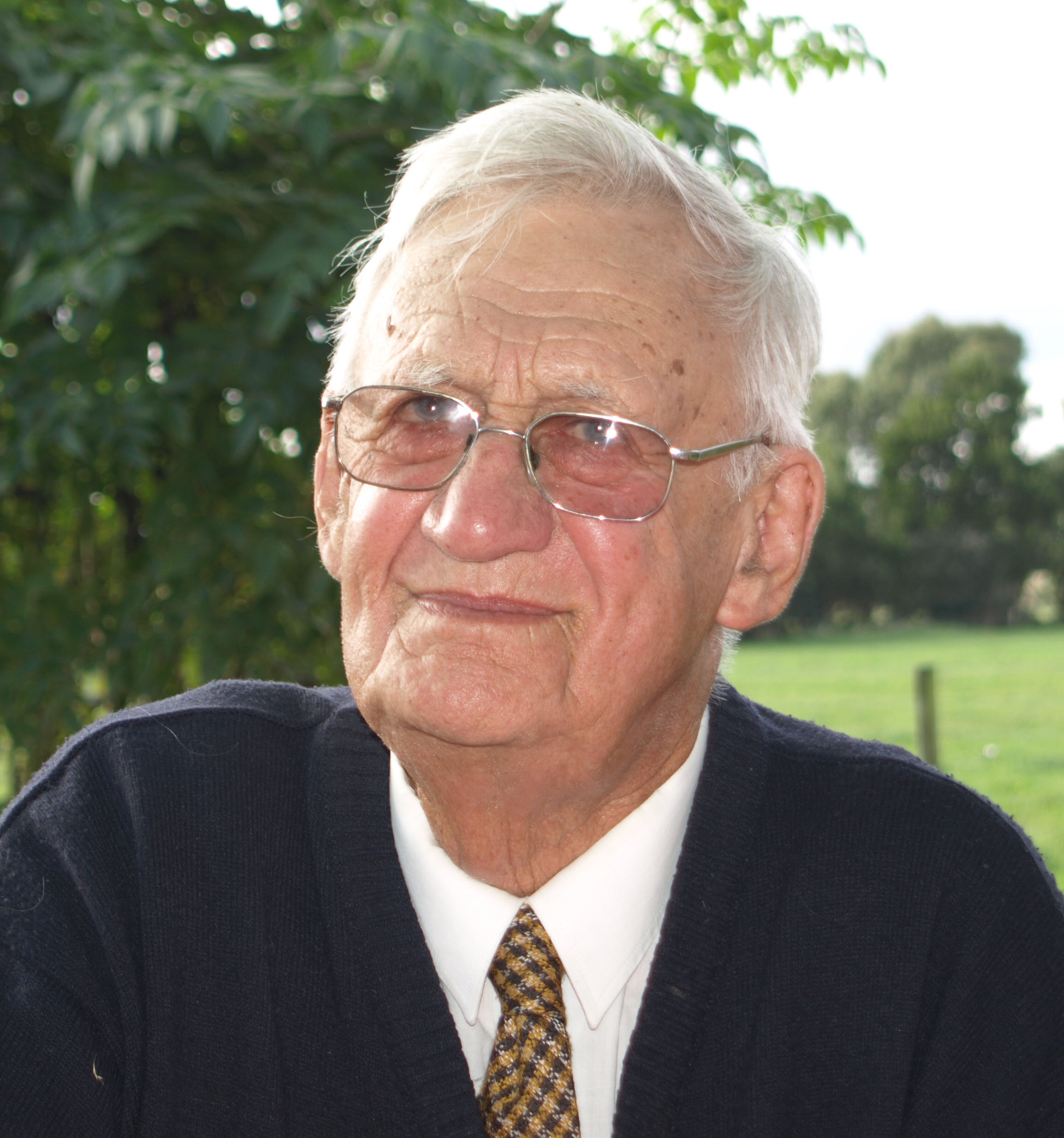
Eric Kent

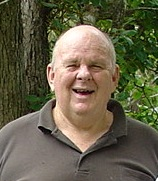
Les Murray

- 1 April – Bill Butchart, middle-distance runner (b. 1933)
- 4 April – John Winneke, Victorian Supreme Court judge (b. 1938)
- 6 April – Lloyd McDermott, barrister and rugby union player (b. 1939)
- 7 April
  - Peter Armstrong, rugby league footballer (b. 1936)
  - Joe Bertony, spy and engineer (b. 1922)
- 9 April – Rod Galt, Australian rules footballer (St Kilda, Carlton) (b. 1951)
- 11 April
  - Lewis Cooper, cricketer (b. 1937)
  - Peter Smedley, businessman (b. 1943)
- 13 April
  - Ron Austin, LGBT rights activist (b. 1929)
  - Wally Carr, boxer (b. 1954)
  - Michael Coper, legal scholar (b. 1946)
- 15 April – Rex Harry, cricketer (b. 1936)
- 16 April – Suzanne Twelftree, Paralympic wheelchair tennis player and powerlifter (b. 1956)
- 18 April – Andrew Mallard, wrongfully convicted ex-convict (died in the United States) (b. 1962)
- 20 April – Joyce Evans, photographer (b. 1929)
- 23 April – Scott W. Sloan, civil engineer and academic (b. 1954)
- 26 April – Eric Kent, Victorian politician (b. 1919)
- 29 April – Les Murray, poet (b. 1938)
- 30 April – Max Evans, Western Australian politician (b. 1930)

=== May ===
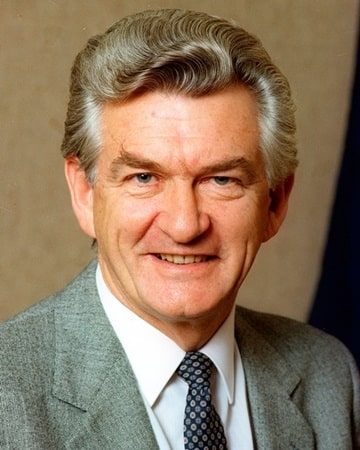
Bob Hawke

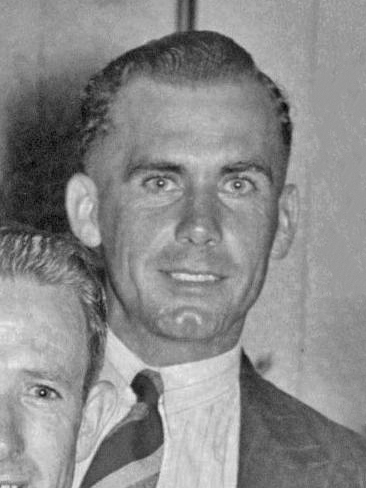
Allan Edwards

- 1 May – Sir Arvi Parbo, businessman (b. 1926)
- 2 May – Mike Williamson, sports commentator (b. 1928)
- 3 May – Enrico Taglietti, architect (b. 1926)
- 4 May – Adam Sky, DJ (b. 1976)
- 12 May – Alan Grover, Olympic rowing coxswain (b. 1944)
- 14 May – Barbara York Main, arachnologist (b. 1929)
- 16 May
  - David Cervinski, soccer player (b. 1970)
  - Bob Hawke, 23rd Prime Minister of Australia and President of the ACTU (b. 1929)
- 19 May – John Millett, poet (b. 1921)
- 20 May – Peter Hitchcock, environmentalist (b. 1944)
- 21 May
  - Lawrence Carroll, painter (died in the United States) (b. 1954)
  - Densey Clyne, naturalist (b. 1922)
  - Brian Kann, Australian rules footballer (Hawthorn) (b. 1933)
  - Peter Schulze, Tasmanian politician (b. 1935)
- 24 May – Alan Murray, golfer (b. 1940)
- 25 May – Jean Burns, aviator (b. 1919)
- 26 May – Kath Venn, Tasmanian politician (b. 1926)
- 27 May – Judith McKenzie, archaeologist (b. 1957)
- 28 May – Nick Yakich, rugby league footballer (b. 1940)
- 30 May – Allan Edwards, cricketer (b. 1921)

=== June ===
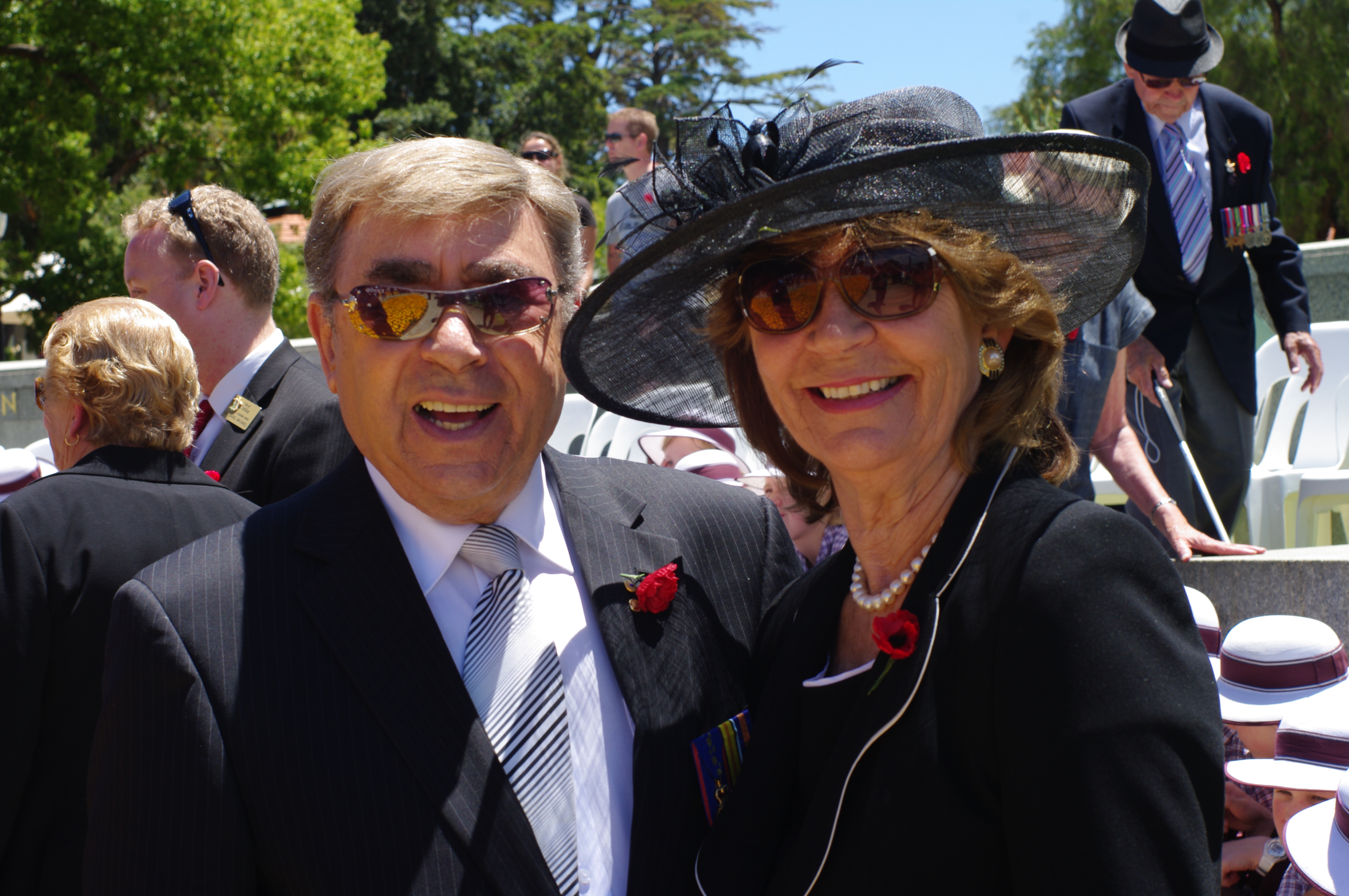
Max Kay

- 1 June – Christobel Mattingley, writer (b. 1931)
- 4 June
  - Roger Covell, musicologist (b. 1931)
  - Max Kay, entertainer and manager (b. 1936)
- 5 June
  - Stan Smith, Australian rules footballer (Collingwood) (b. 1925)
  - Peter Toogood, golfer (b. 1930)
- 8 June
  - John Causby, cricketer (b. 1942)
  - Bob Henderson, Australian rules footballer (Fitzroy) (b. 1934)
- 12 June – Don Benson, Australian rules footballer (Richmond) (b. 1920)
- 13 June – Anne Hamilton-Byrne, cult leader of The Family (b. 1921)
- 15 June – John Wilson, Australian rules footballer (Richmond) (b. 1940)
- 18 June – Alf Hughes, Australian rules footballer (Hawthorn) (b. 1930)
- 19 June – Christine Barnetson, swimmer (b. 1948)
- 20 June
  - Bill Collins, film critic (b. 1934)
  - Noel White, rugby league footballer (b. 1923)
- 21 June
  - Lindsay Drake, rugby league footballer (b. 1950)
  - John Vernon, Olympic high jumper (b. 1929)
- 23 June
  - John Kobelke, Western Australian politician (b. 1949)
  - George Strickland, Western Australian politician (b. 1942)
- 24 June – Steve Dunleavy, journalist (died in the United States) (b. 1938)
- 25 June
  - Mack Atkins, Australian rules footballer (Hawthorn) (b. 1931)
  - Bryan Marshall, actor (b. 1938)
- 26 June – Ian Johnson, television executive (b. 1949)
- 28 June – Brian Rhodes, cricketer (b. 1951)
- 30 June – Doug Ford, cricketer (b. 1928)

=== July ===
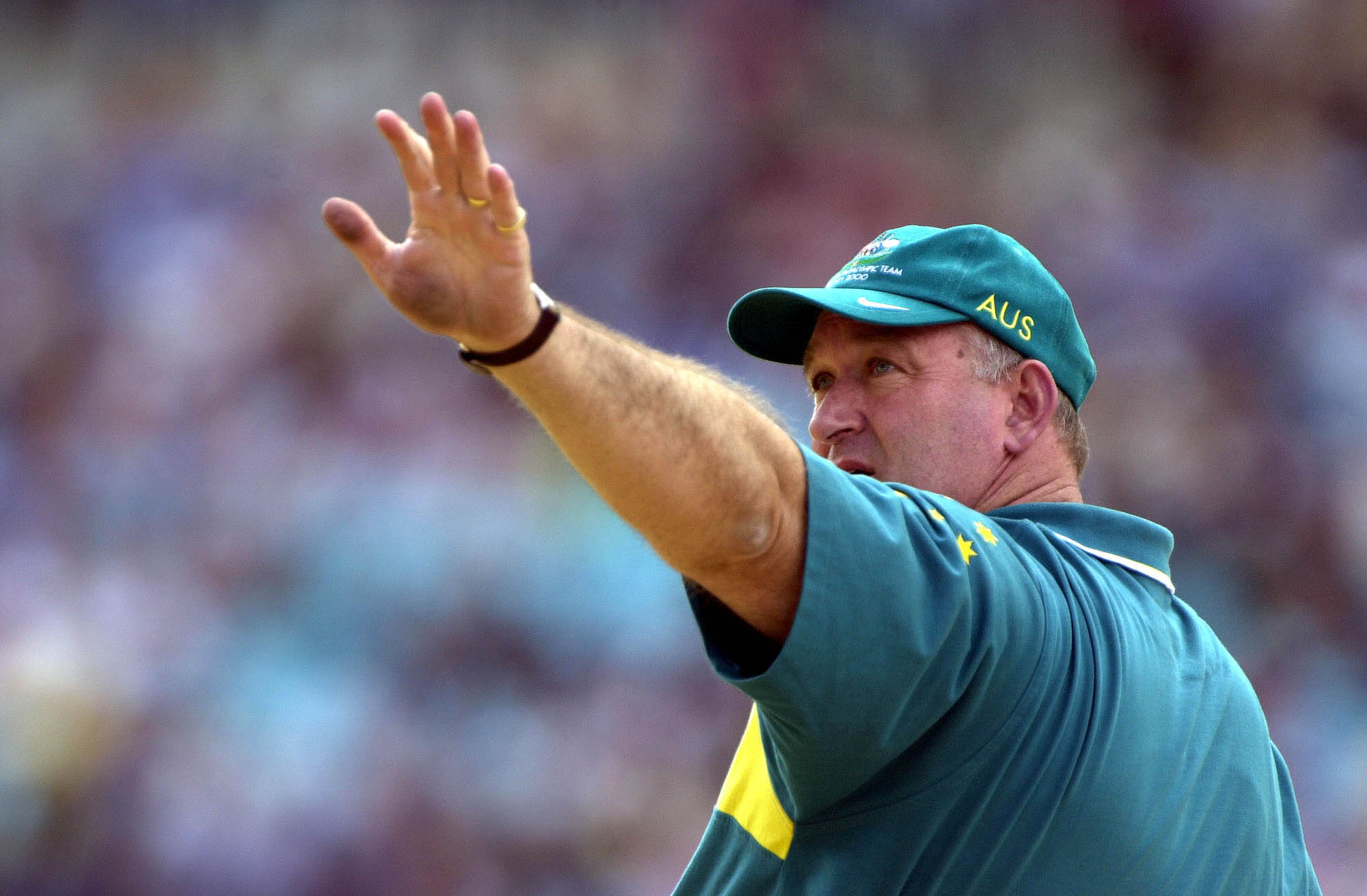
Bruce Wallrodt

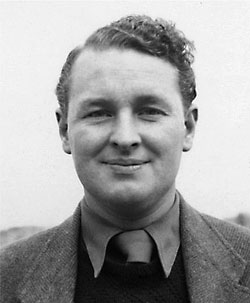
Neil Davey

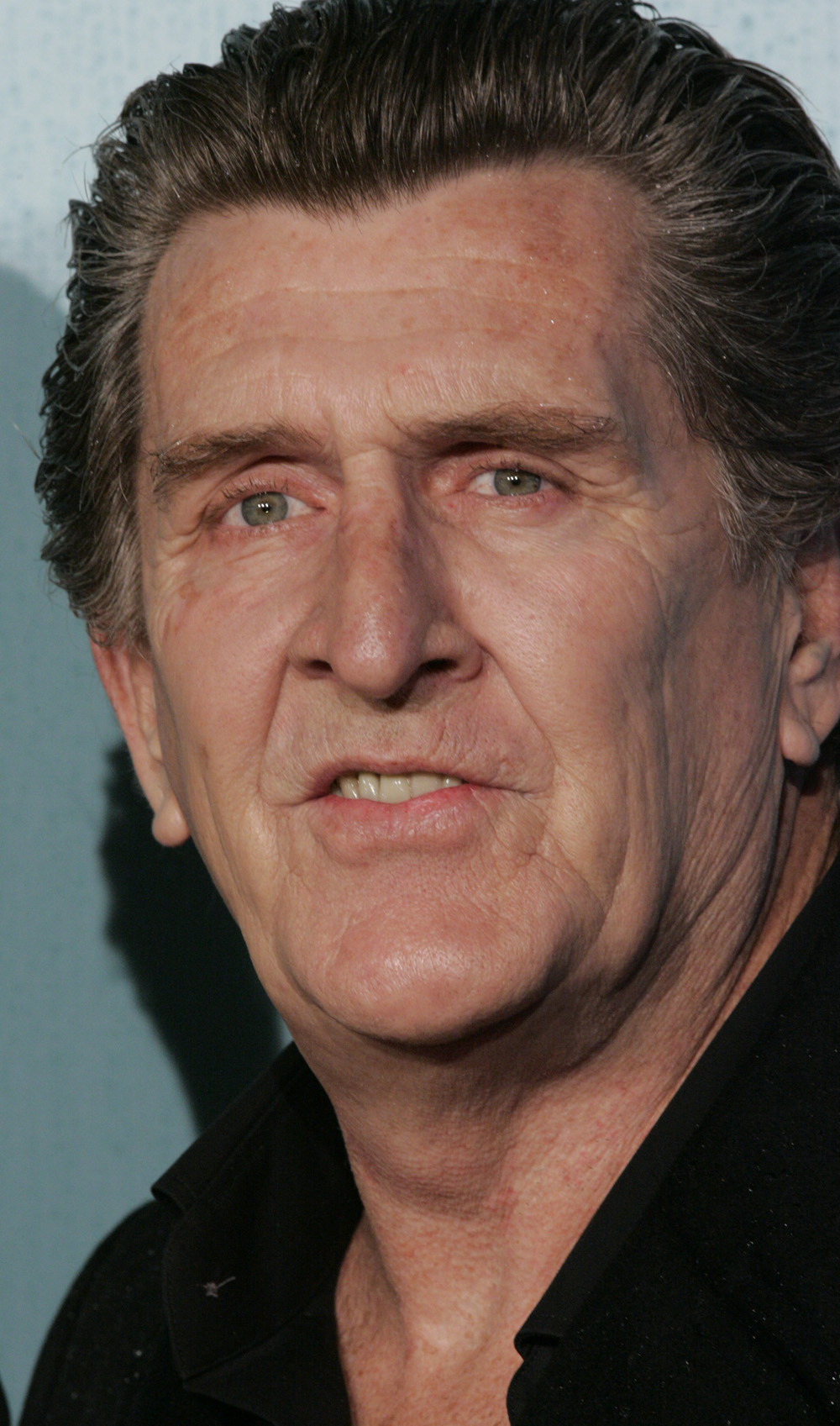
Richard Carter

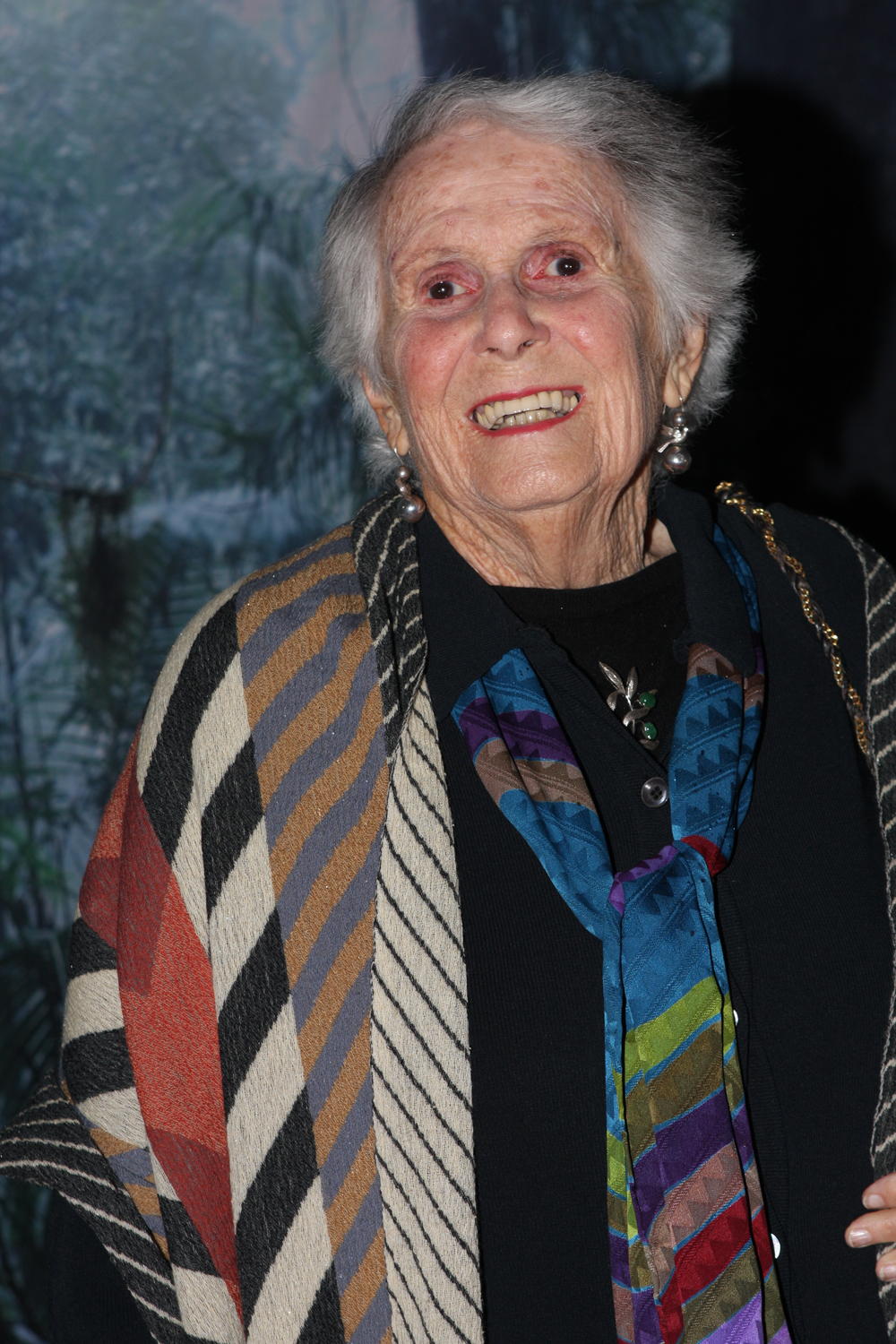
Margaret Fulton

- 2 July – Bruce Wallrodt, Paralympic athlete (b. 1951)
- 5 July
  - Dorothy Buckland-Fuller, sociologist and social activist (b. 1922)
  - Neil Davey, public servant (b. 1922)
  - Kevin Higgins, Australian rules footballer (Geelong, Fitzroy) (b. 1951)
- 6 July
  - Bill Casimaty, farmer (b. 1935)
  - Peter Hamilton, Australian rules footballer (Melbourne) (b. 1956)
  - John Waddington, Australian rules footballer (North Melbourne) (b. 1938)
- 8 July
  - Nick Garratt, rowing coach (b. 1947)
  - Neil Oliver, Western Australian politician (b. 1933)
- 10 July – Nino Randazzo, journalist and member of the Italian Senate (b. 1932)
- 13 July
  - Richard Carter, actor (b. 1953)
  - Kerry Reed-Gilbert, poet, author, collector and Aboriginal rights activist (b. 1956)
- 15 July – Doug Flett, songwriter (b. 1935)
- 19 July – David Hunt, New South Wales Supreme Court judge (b. 1935)
- 20 July – Peter McNamara, tennis player and coach (died in Germany) (b. 1955)
- 21 July
  - Laurie Hergenhan, literary scholar (b. 1931)
  - Ann Moyal, historian (b. 1926)
- 24 July – Margaret Fulton, cookbook writer (b. 1924)
- 25 July – Bruce Webster, New South Wales politician and broadcaster (b. 1927)
- 26 July – Graham Freudenberg, political speechwriter (b. 1934)
- 28 July – Ian Drohan, Australian rules footballer (St Kilda) (b. 1932)
- 29 July
  - Doris Goddard, cabaret singer and actress (b. 1930)
  - Sam Trimble, cricketer (b. 1934)
- 31 July
  - Barrington Pheloung, composer (b. 1954)
  - John Scarlett, Australian rules footballer (Geelong, South Melbourne) (b. 1947)

=== August ===
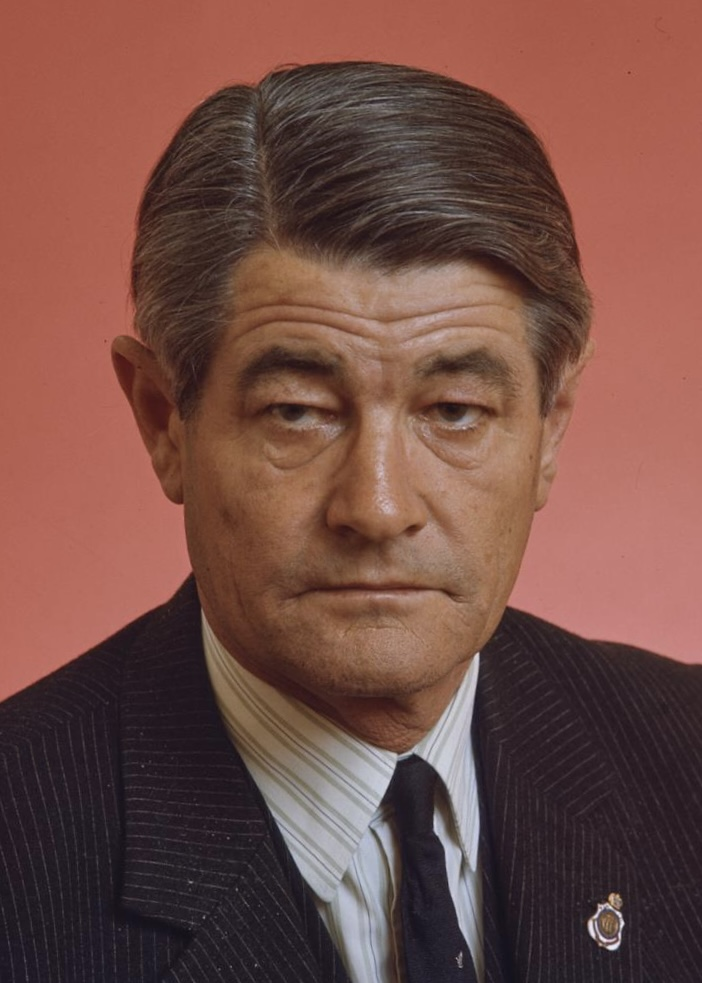
Jim Forbes

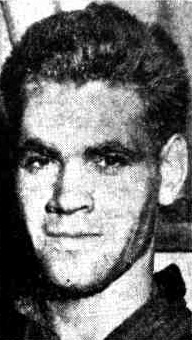
Polly Farmer

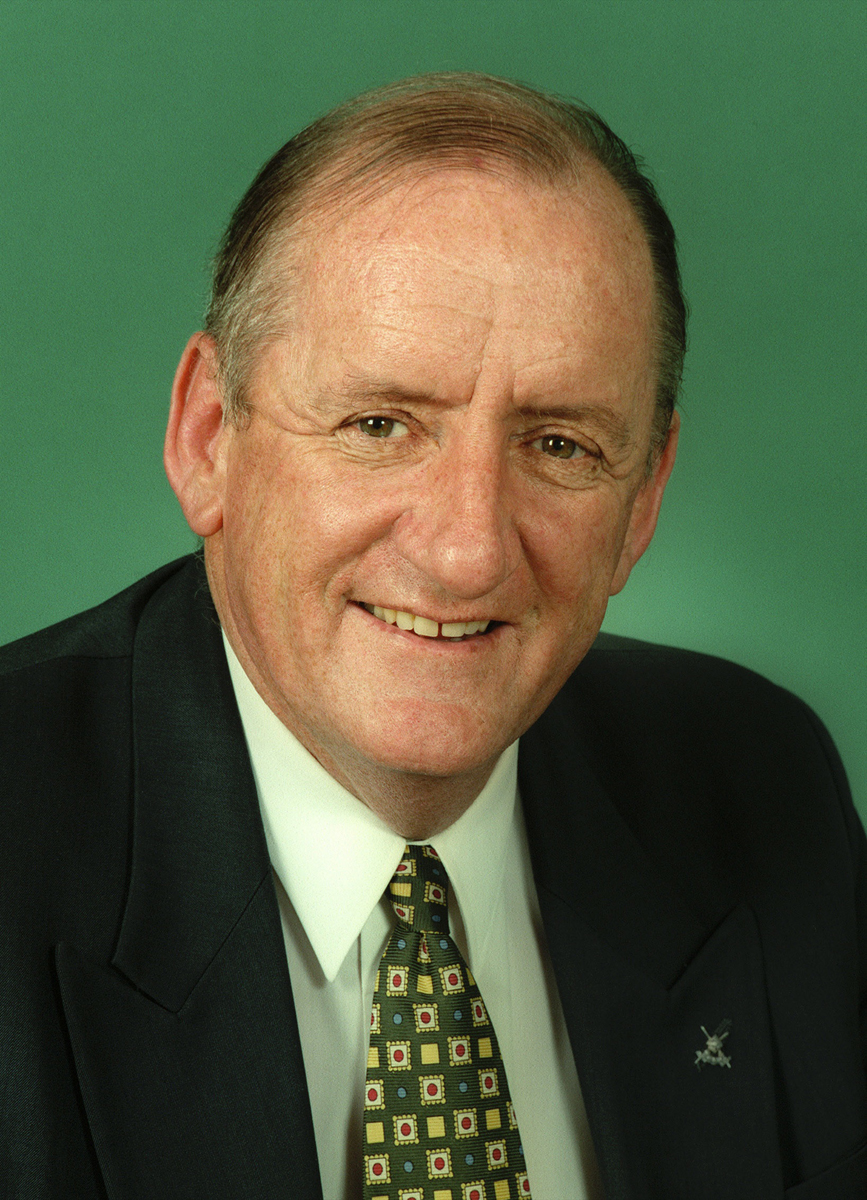
Tim Fischer

- 1 August – Barrington Pheloung, composer (b. 1954)
- 3 August – Damien Lovelock, musician (b. 1954)
- 5 August – Russell Middlemiss, Australian rules footballer (Geelong) (b. 1929)
- 6 August
  - Mick Miller, police officer (b. 1926)
  - George Whaley, actor and director (b. 1934)
- 8 August – Malcolm T. Elliott, radio personality (b. 1946)
- 9 August – Hendricus Vogels, Olympic cyclist (b. 1942)
- 10 August – Jim Forbes, South Australian politician (b. 1923)
- 11 August
  - Bluey Adams, Australian rules footballer (Melbourne) (b. 1935)
  - Ningali Lawford, actor (died in the United Kingdom) (b. 1967)
- 14 August
  - Polly Farmer, Australian rules footballer (Geelong) (b. 1935)
  - Ben Unwin, actor (b. 1977)
- 15 August – Glenn Tasker, President of Paralympics Australia (b. 1951)
- 17 August – Ronald Gray, Olympic athlete (b. 1932)
- 19 August
  - John Matthews, New South Wales politician (b. 1928)
  - Jan Ruff O'Herne, human rights activist, former "comfort woman" (b. 1923)
- 20 August – Colin Beard, Australian rules footballer (South Fremantle, Richmond) (b. 1941)
- 21 August – Norma Croker, Olympic athlete (b. 1934)
- 22 August – Tim Fischer, 10th Deputy Prime Minister of Australia (b. 1946)
- 23 August – Peter Moscatt, rugby league footballer (b. 1943)
- 24 August – Tony Nichols, Anglican prelate (b. 1938)
- 28 August – Max McDonald, Victorian politician (b. 1927)
- 30 August – Elaine Darling, Queensland politician (b. 1936)
- 31 August – Jane Mathews, Federal Court judge (b. 1940)

=== September ===
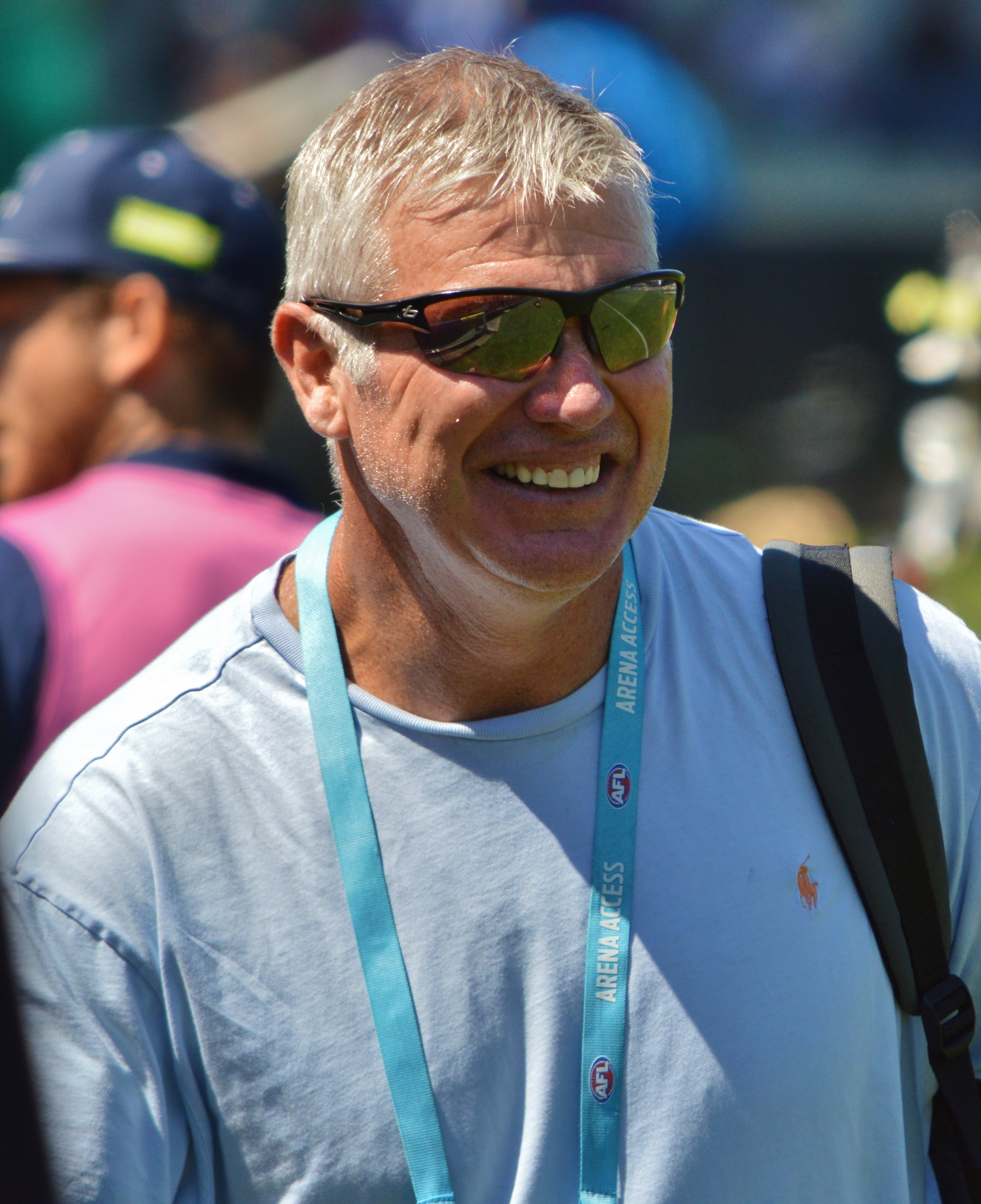
Danny Frawley

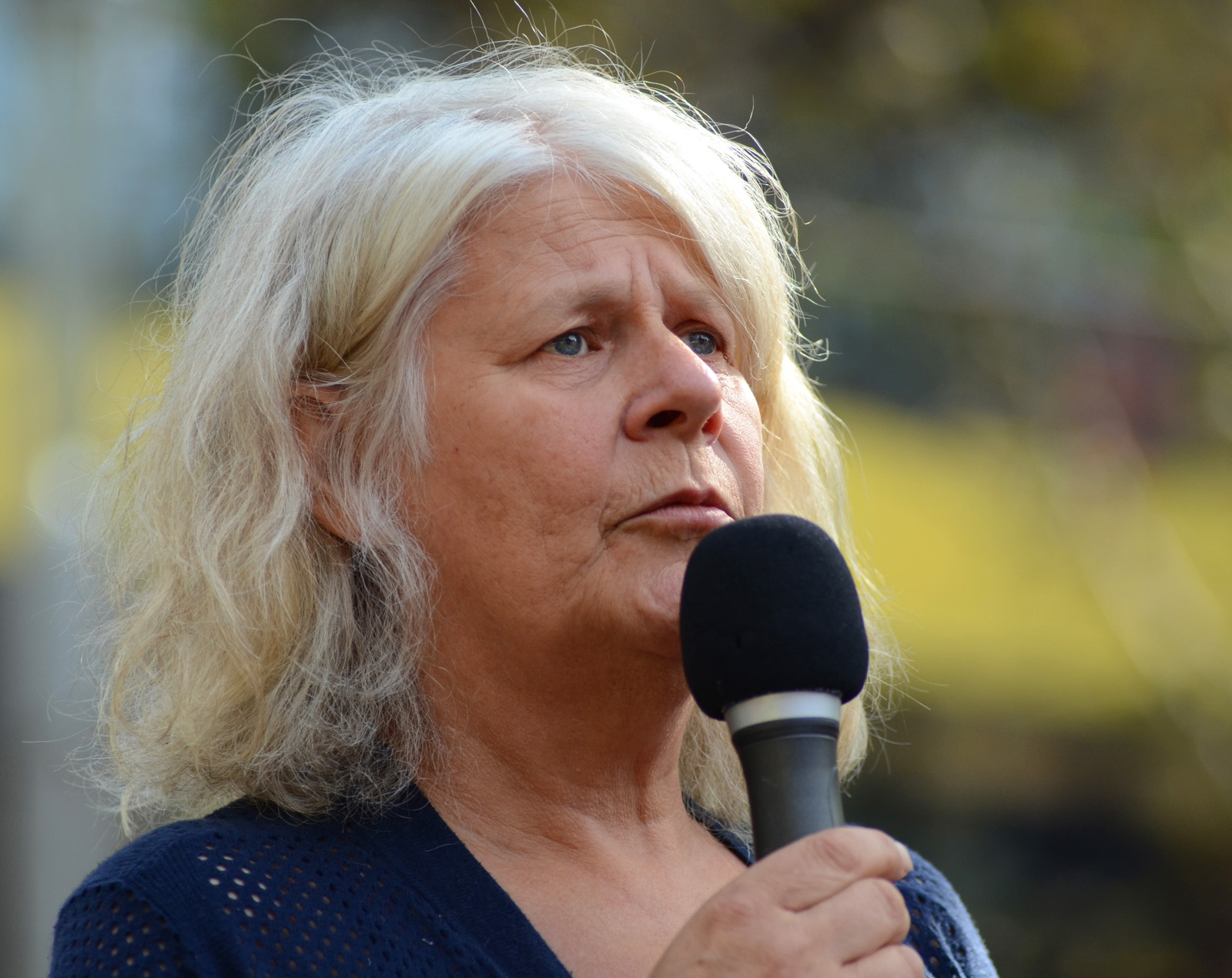
Penny Whetton

- 1 September – Alison Cheek, Episcopal priest (died in the United States) (b. 1927)
- 3 September
  - David Evans, Western Australian politician (b. 1924)
  - Tony Thiessen, Australian rules footballer (Melbourne, Carlton, North Melbourne) (b. 1942)
- 6 September – Susan Irvine, author and educator (b. 1928)
- 8 September – Paul Lyons, Olympic taekwondo practitioner (b. 1969)
- 9 September – Danny Frawley, Australian rules footballer (St Kilda) and coach (Richmond) (b. 1963)
- 10 September – Hal Colebatch, author (b. 1945)
- 11 September – Penny Whetton, climatologist (b. 1958)
- 13 September
  - Paul Cronin, actor (b. 1938)
  - Charles Henderson, weightlifter (b. 1922)
- 16 September – Peter Lucas, Australian rules footballer (Collingwood) (b. 1929)
- 17 September – Robert Oatey, Australian rules footballer (b. 1942)
- 20 September – Jim Macken, lawyer, judge and human rights activist (b. 1927)
- 21 September – David Combe, political lobbyist (b. 1943)
- 23 September – Tauto Sansbury, Indigenous activist (b. 1949)
- 26 September – Martin Wesley-Smith, composer (b. 1945)
- 29 September – John D'Arcy, Australian rules footballer (Richmond) (b. 1935)
- 30 September – Tom Allsop, Australian rules footballer (Hawthorn) (b. 1929)

=== October ===
- 1 October – Richard Scotton, health economist (b. 1930)
- 2 October – Robert Hickman, Australian rules footballer (Richmond) (b. 1942)
- 4 October – Bryce Gaudry, New South Wales politician (b. 1942)
- 6 October
  - Neale Lavis, equestrian (b. 1930)
  - Eddie Lumsden, rugby league footballer (b. 1936)
- 8 October
  - John Bennett, Tasmanian politician (b. 1942)
  - Louis Waller, legal scholar (b. 1935)
  - Reg Watson, television producer and screenwriter (b. 1926)
- 9 October – John Williams, Australian rules footballer (Carlton) (b. 1940)
- 11 October – Richard Tracey, Federal Court judge and military officer (died in the United States) (b. 1948)
- 14 October – Patrick Ward, actor (b. 1950)
- 21 October – Peter Hobbs, musician (b. 1961)
- 22 October – Garry Koehler, singer-songwriter (b. 1955)
- 27 October
  - Ivan Milat, convicted serial killer (b. 1944)
  - Anne Phelan, actress (b. 1948)
- 30 October
  - Beatrice Faust, co-founder of Women's Electoral Lobby and author (b. 1939)
  - Paul Whelan, New South Wales politician (b. 1943)

=== November ===
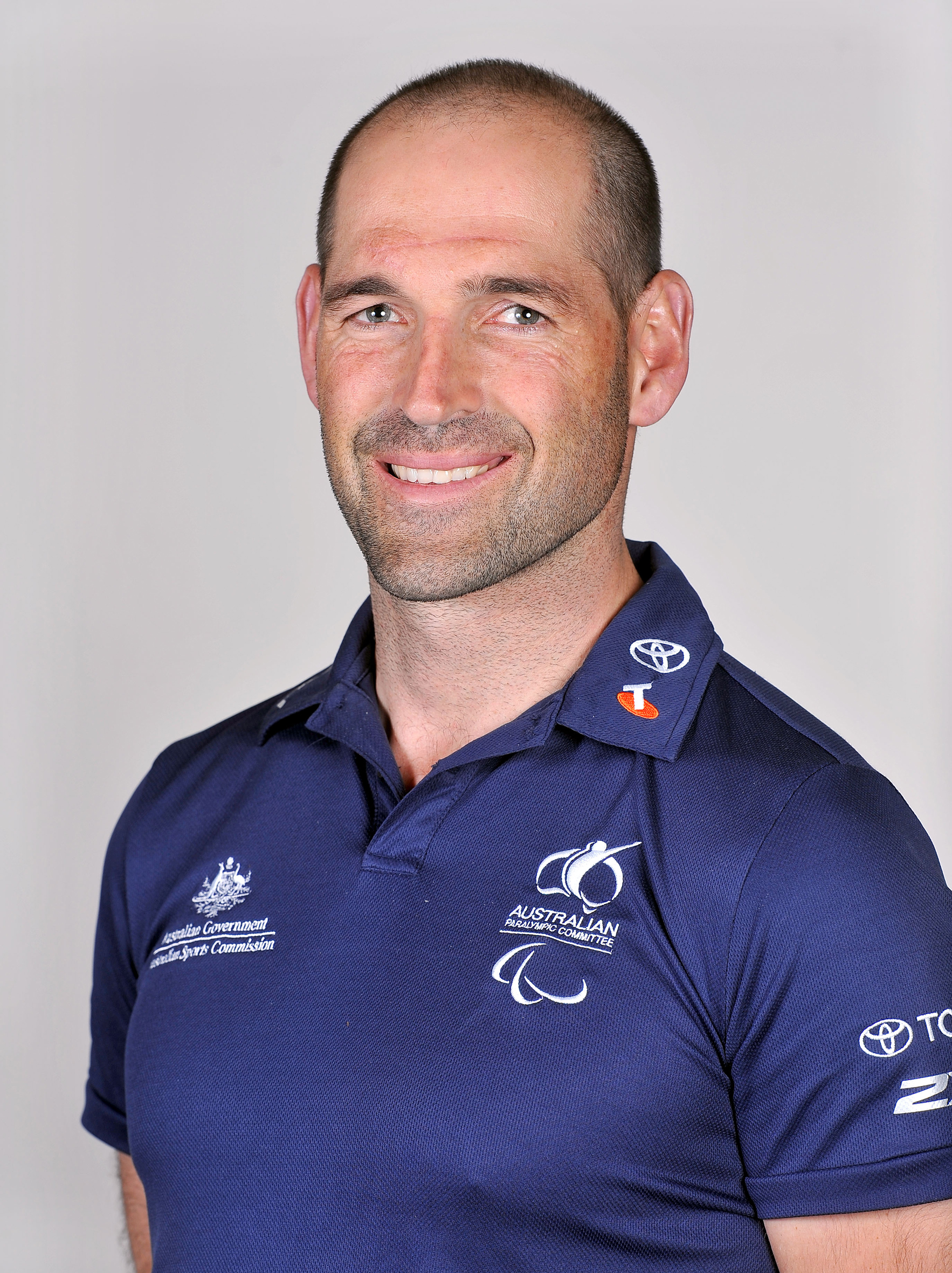
Kieran Modra

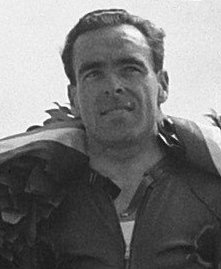
Ken Kavanagh

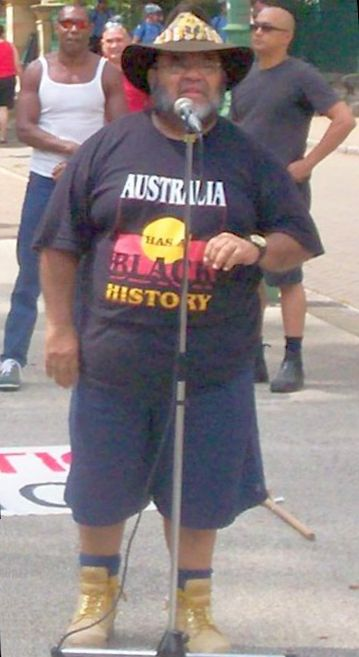
Sam Watson

- 5 November
  - Kevin Hogan, broadcaster and Australian rules footballer (South Melbourne) (b. 1934)
  - Robert Smithies, rugby league footballer (Hull Kingston Rovers, Balmain) (b. 1934)
- 6 November
  - John Curro, conductor (b. 1932)
  - Clive Minton, ornithologist (b. 1934)
- 9 November
  - Dwight Ritchie, boxer (b. 1992)
  - Mehmet Tillem, Victorian politician (b. 1974)
- 13 November
  - Stephen Albert, actor and singer (b. 1950)
  - Kieran Modra, Paralympic cyclist (b. 1972)
- 15 November
  - Tony Mann, cricketer (b. 1945)
  - Ray Preston, rugby league footballer (Newtown Jets) (b. 1929)
- 17 November
  - Ben Humphreys, Queenslander politician (b. 1934)
  - John Wegner, opera singer (b. 1950)
- 19 November
  - John Abel, New South Wales politician (b. 1939)
  - Colin Tatz, historian (b. 1934)
- 22 November
  - Tony Bull, Australian rules footballer (Melbourne) (b. 1930)
  - Bill Waterhouse, bookmaker (b. 1922)
- 23 November – Terry Board, Australian rules footballer (Carlton) (b. 1945)
- 24 November
  - J. Bruce Jacobs, academic (b. 1943)
  - Clive James, writer and broadcaster (died in the United Kingdom) (b. 1939)
- 25 November – Tsebin Tchen, Victorian politician (b. 1941)
- 26 November – Ken Kavanagh, motorcycle racer (died in Italy) (b. 1923)
- 27 November
  - Martin Armiger, musician, record producer and composer (b. 1949)
  - Sam Watson, activist, politician and writer (b. 1952)
- 28 November – Graham Crouch, athlete (died in Germany) (b. 1948)
- 30 November – Doug Cox, Australian rules footballer (St Kilda) (b. 1957)

=== December ===
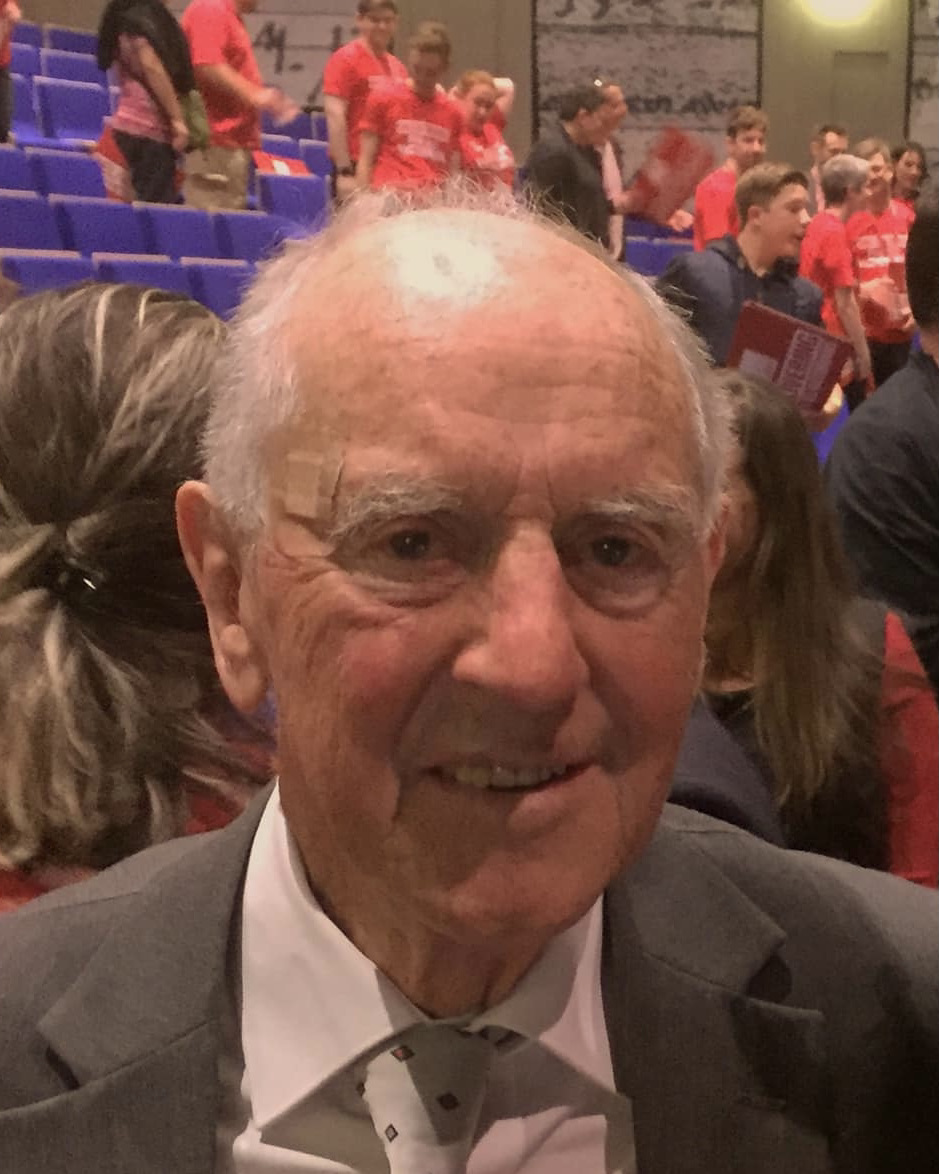
John Cain Jr.

- 1 December – Stuart Fraser, musician
- 2 December – Greedy Smith, musician (b. 1956)
- 5 December – Don Howell, Australian rules footballer (St Kilda, Collingwood) (b. 1935)
- 9 December – Paddy Guinane, Australian rules footballer (Richmond) (b. 1939)
- 10 December – Bill Welsh, Australian rules footballer (Collingwood) (b. 1924)
- 13 December – Graham Cooper, Australian rules footballer (Hawthorn) (b. 1938)
- 14 December – Ken Wright, Victorian politician (b. 1925)
- 15 December – Alfred Dennis, New South Wales politician (b. 1924)
- 18 December – Doug Ricketson, rugby league footballer (b. 1930)
- 20 December – Robert Moir, medical researcher (died in the United States) (b. 1961)
- 21 December – Ron Penny, immunologist (b. 1936)
- 23 December – John Cain Jr., 41st Premier of Victoria (b. 1931)
- 29 December – M. C. Ricklefs, Indonesianist (b. 1943)
- 30 December – Horst Kwech, racecar driver (died in the United States) (b. 1937)

== See also ==
- 2019 Australian federal election
- 2019 in Australian television
- List of Australian films of 2019
