= Drohan =

Drohan is a surname. Notable people with the surname include:

- Eddie Drohan (1876–1938), Australian rules footballer
- Frank Drohan (1879–1953), Irish politician
- Ian Drohan (1932–2019), Australian rules footballer
- Kate Drohan (born 1973), American softball head coach and former collegiate player
- Shane Drohan (born 1999), American baseball player
- Tom Drohan (1887–1926), American baseball player
