= Adam Sky =

Adam Sky may refer to:

- Adamski, British DJ
- Adam Sky (Australian DJ)
- Adam Air, incorporated as PT. Adam SkyConnection Airlines
