= 2019 in Australian television =

This is a list of Australian television-related events, debuts, finales, and cancellations that were scheduled to occur in 2019, the 64th year of continuous operation of television in Australia.

== Events ==
=== January ===
Date	Event	Source
1	The annual Sydney New Year's Eve fireworks are broadcast by the ABC	
5	The Nine Network announced new co-hosts for Today, Today Extra and Weekend Today following the exit of Karl Stefanovic, Peter Stefanovic and Sylvia Jeffreys in late 2018 amidst declining ratings for the morning brands. Deborah Knight, Tom Steinfort and Tony Jones will join Georgie Gardner as presenters of Today, while David Campbell will co-host Weekend Today and three of five days of Today Extra, with Richard Wilkins co-hosting two days of Today Extra.	
14	The 2019 Australian Open will air on the Nine Network, after the network purchased the broadcasting rights from the Seven Network, who had held the rights since 1973	

=== February ===
Date	Event	Source
10	The official 2019 OzTam television ratings period begins	
18	The Nine Network claims the first week of an official ratings season for the first time since 2009.	

=== April ===
Date	Event	Source
14	A two-week suspension in OzTam television ratings begins for the Easter break.	
28	Official OzTam ratings resume after a two-week non-ratings period over Easter.	

=== June ===
Date	Event	Source
20	WIN Television axes the Four Regions: Central West, Riverina, Border North East and Wide Bay local news bulletins because of insufficient commercial viability to fund those Regions news operations.	

=== August ===
Date	Event	Source
21	After 6 and 12 years off free to air television, it is announced that long running U.S. daytime soaps Days of Our Lives and The Young and the Restless will return to the Nine Network and resume from 2 September 2019 airing on multichannel 9Gem. With the two soaps returning, this move resumes the 4-decade tradition of daytime soap operas on Australian television and dethrones The Bold and the Beautiful (broadcast on Network 10) as the only U.S. soap opera on free to air television.	

=== October ===
Date	Event	Source
18	Seven West Media and Prime Media Group announce they'll Merge to Become Australia's Largest Television Network	

=== November ===
Date	Event	Source
30	The last day of the official 2019 OzTam television ratings period	

=== December ===
Date	Event	Source
1	The Nine Network wins the ratings season for the first time since 2006, defeating the Seven Network.	
4	Network 10 parent company CBS Corporation merges with MTV and Nick parent Viacom, forming ViacomCBS.	

== Television channels ==
=== New channels ===
- 1 July - SBS World Movies

=== Channel closures ===
- 17 May – Your Money
- 29 December – 7food network

== Premieres ==
=== Domestic series ===
List of domestic television series premieres
Program	Original airdate	Network	Source
Bloom	1 January	Stan	
Aussie Lobster Men	12 February	7mate	
Total Control	13 October	ABC	
Blue Water Empire	25 June	ABC	
The Cry	3 February	ABC	
Diary of an Uber Driver	14 August	ABC	
Escape from the City	3 January	ABC	
Frayed	16 October	ABC	
The Gates of Hell	TBA	ABC	
Hardball	22 April	ABC	
The Heights	22 February	ABC	
The InBESTigators	21 June	ABC Me	
The Unlisted	15 September	ABC Me	
Christians Like Us	3 April	SBS	
Mastermind	15 April	SBS	
Medicine or Myth	20 May	SBS	
My Family Secret	TBA	SBS	
The Hunting	1 August	SBS	
Australian Gangster	TBA	Seven Network	
Extreme Weddings	TBA	Seven Network	
Ms Fisher's MODern Murder Mysteries	21 February	Seven Network	
The Proposal	27 August	Seven Network	
Inside 'The G'	19 September	Seven Network	
Undercurrent	30 January	Seven Network	
Celebrity Name Game	13 May	Network 10	
Chris & Julia's Sunday Night Takeaway	24 February	Network 10	
Five Bedrooms	15 May	Network 10	
Mr. Black	7 May	Network 10	
My Life is Murder	17 July	Network 10	
The Masked Singer Australia	23 September	Network 10	
Bad Mothers	18 February	Nine Network	
Lego Masters	28 April	Nine Network	
Murder, Lies and Alibis	4 February	Nine Network	
The End	TBA	Fox Showcase	
Lambs of God	21 July	Fox Showcase	
Upright	TBA	Fox Showcase	
Ready Set Dance	21 January	Nick Jr	
Teen Mom Australia	7 July	MTV	

=== Delayed to 2020 ===
List of domestic delayed television series premieres
Program	Original airdate	Network	Source
Hungry Ghosts	TBA	SBS	
Between Two Worlds	TBA	Seven Network	
The Secrets She Keeps	TBA	Network 10	

=== International series ===
List of international television series premieres
Program	Original airdate	Network	Country of origin	Source
Cheat	TBA	Seven Network	United Kingdom	
Gordon, Gino And Fred: Road Trip	TBA	Seven Network	United Kingdom	
Cleaning Up	TBA	Seven Network	United Kingdom	
Islands of America	TBA	Seven Network	United States	
Manhunt	TBA	Seven Network	United Kingdom	
Hatton Garden	TBA	Seven Network	United Kingdom	
Miss Scarlet and The Duke	TBA	Seven Network	United Kingdom	
Proven Innocent	TBA	Seven Network	United States	
The Bay	TBA	Seven Network	United Kingdom	
The Passage	TBA	Seven Network	United States	
The Gilded Age	TBA	Network 10	United States	
New Amsterdam	TBA	Nine Network	United States	
Dynasties with David Attenborough	TBA	Nine Network	United Kingdom	
Chernobyl	TBA	Fox Showcase	United States	
Devs	TBA	Fox Showcase	United States	
Fosse/Verdon	TBA	Fox Showcase	United States	
Les Misérables	TBA	BBC First	United Kingdom	
Lindsay Lohan’s Beach Club	TBA	MTV	United States	
Magnum P.I.	TBA	FOX8	United States	
Roswell, New Mexico	TBA	FOX8	United States	
Pretty Little Liars: The Perfectionists	TBA	FOX8	United States	
The InBetween	TBA	Universal TV	United States	
The Great Kiwi Bake Off	TBA	LifeStyle Food	New Zealand	
The Hills: New Beginnings	TBA	MTV	United States	
Snack World	2 November	Cartoon Network	Japan	
Tipping Point	2 December	Nine Network	United Kingdom	

== Programming changes ==
=== Changes to network affiliation ===
Criterion for inclusion in the following list is that Australian premiere episodes will air in Australia for the first time on a new channel. This includes when a program is moved from a free-to-air network's primary channel to a digital multi-channel, as well as when a program moves between subscription television channels – provided the preceding criterion is met. Ended television series which change networks for repeat broadcasts are not included in the list.

List of domestic television series which changed network affiliation
Program	Date	New network	Previous network	Source
Love Island Australia	7 October	Nine Network	9Go!	

List of international television programs which changed network affiliation
Program	Date	New network	Previous network	Country of origin	Source
Bakugan: Battle Planet	14 July	9Go!	Cartoon Network		

=== Free-to-air premieres ===
This is a list of programs which made their premiere on Australian free-to-air television that had previously premiered on Australian subscription television. Programs may still air on the original subscription television network.

List of international television programs which premiered on free-to-air television for the first time
Program	Date	Free-to-air network	Subscription network(s)	Country of origin	Source

=== Subscription premieres ===
This is a list of programs which made their debut on Australian subscription television, having previously premiered on Australian free-to-air television. Programs may still air (first or repeat) on the original free-to-air television network.

List of domestic television programs which premiered on subscription television for the first time
Program	Date	Free-to-air network	Subscription network(s)	Source

=== Returning programs ===
Australian produced programs which are returning with a new season after being absent from television from the previous calendar year.

Show	Return date	Previous run	Type of return	Previous channel	New/same channel	Source
Changing Rooms	13 February	1998-2005	Revival	Nine Network	Network 10	
Dancing with the Stars	18 February	2004-2015	New season	Seven Network	Network 10	
SeaChange	6 August	1998-2000	New season	ABC	Nine Network	
Seven Year Switch	11 June	2016-2017	Reboot	Seven Network	same	
The Amazing Race Australia	28 October	2011-2014	Reboot	Seven Network	Network 10	
Wife Swap Australia	TBA	2012	Reboot	LifeStyle You	Seven Network	

=== Endings ===
List of domestic television series endings
Program	End date	Network	Start date	Source
Andrew Denton's Interview	24 August	Seven Network	17 April 2018	
Changing Rooms	23 February	Network 10	13 February	
The Footy Show	25 September	Nine Network	24 March 1994	
Kids' WB	29 November	Nine Network	16 September 2006	
Pointless	10 May	Network 10	23 July 2018	
Saturday Night Rove	31 August	Network 10	24 August	
Sunday Night	24 November	Seven Network	8 February 2009	

== Deaths ==
Date	Name	Age	Broadcast notability	Reference section
2 January	Darius Perkins	aged 54	Originated the role of Scott Robinson in Neighbours in 1985	
6 January	Annalise Braakensiek	aged 46	Model, actress and television presenter	
7 January	Jimmy Hannan	aged 84	Television presenter, comedian and singer	
3 February	Carmen Duncan	aged 76	Character actress of stage, television and film, sister of actress Paula Duncan)	
1 March	Michael Willesee (AO)	aged 76	Journalist and TV presenter	
30 March	Geoff Harvey (OAM)	aged 84	Musician, who served as musical directors on numerous programs, including The Mike Walsh Show and Midday with Ray Martin	
20 June	Bill Collins	aged 84	Movie presenter, film critic and film historian	
13 July	Richard Carter	aged 65	Film and television actor	
8 August	Malcolm T. Elliott	age 73	Television host, radio presenter and journalist	
14 August	Ben Unwin	aged 41	Actor best known for his role in soap opera Home and Away, as Jesse McGregor	
27 October	Anne Phelan	aged 71	Actress and activist best known for her role as Myra Desmond in Prisoner and Monica Taylor in Something in the Air	

- see also: (2019 in Australia)

== See also ==
- 2019 in Australia
- List of Australian films of 2019
