= List of Australian films of 2019 =

This is a list of Australian films scheduled for release in 2019.

== Film releases ==
Opening	Title	Cast and crew	Details	Ref.
January 17	Storm Boy	Director: Shawn Seet; Cast: Geoffrey Rush, Jai Courtney, Finn Little, Trevor Jamieson, Morgana Davies, Erik Thomson, David Gulpilil, Simone Annan	Sony Pictures (Australia) Good Deed Entertainment (US)	
February 7	The Lego Movie 2: The Second Part	Director: Mike Mitchell Cast: Chris Pratt, Elizabeth Banks, Will Arnett, Tiffany Haddish, Stephanie Beatriz, Charlie Day, Alison Brie, Nick Offerman, Maya Rudolph	Warner Bros. Pictures (co-produced by U.S. and Denmark)	
February 8	Buoyancy	Director: Rodd Rathjen Cast: Sarm Heng, Thanawut Kasro, Mony Ros, Saichia Wongwirot	2019 Berlin International Film Festival	
March 29	Dumbo	Director: Tim Burton Cast: Colin Farrell, Michael Keaton, Danny DeVito, Eva Green, Alan Arkin	Walt Disney Studios Motion Pictures (co-produced by U.K., Canada and U.S.)	
May 2	Top End Wedding	Director: Wayne Blair Cast: Miranda Tapsell, Gwilym Lee		
June 5	Palm Beach	Director: Rachel Ward Cast: Frances Berry, Bryan Brown, Matilda Brown, Richard E. Grant	Sydney Film Festival	
June 7	I Am Mother	Director: Grant Sputore; Cast: Luke Hawker, Clara Rugaard, Rose Byrne, Hilary Swank		
July 4	Mystify: Michael Hutchence	Director: Richard Lowenstein; Cast: Michael Hutchence	Ghost Pictures & Passion Pictures (Co-produced by the BBC)	
August 8	Danger Close: The Battle of Long Tan	Director: Kriv Stenders; Cast: Travis Fimmel, Daniel Webber, Luke Bracey, Richard Roxburgh		
August 8	Palm Beach	Director: Rachel Ward Cast: Frances Berry, Bryan Brown, Mathilda Brown, Richard E. Grant		
August 29	The Nightingale	Director: Jennifer Kent; Cast: Aisling Franciosi, Sam Claflin, Baykali Ganambarr, Damon Herriman, Harry Greenwood, Ewen Leslie, Charlie Shotwell, Michael Sheasby		
September 8	D'art	Director: Karl von Möller; Cast: Robert Clinch, Jeff Brown, Tommy Dysart, Joan Brockenshire, Bill Buckle, Gerard Vaughan, Lauraine Diggins, David Thomas,	Artisan Films (AUS)	
September 26	Ride Like a Girl	Director: Rachel Griffiths Cast: Teresa Palmer, Sam Neill		
October 21	Fragmentary	Director: Jace Pickard; Cast: Jace Pickard, Jacinta Moses, Helen Shoobert, Debbie Neilson, Renee Lim		

== See also ==
- 2019 in Australia
- 2019 in Australian television
- List of 2019 box office number-one films in Australia
