= Ron Smith (Australian footballer, born 1917) =

Australian rules footballer (1917–1998)

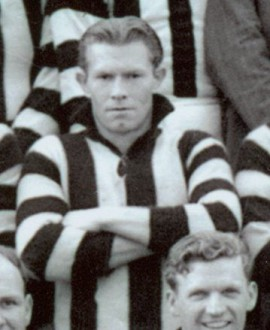
- Smith in 1945

Personal information
- Full name: Ron Smith
- Born: 6 May 1917
- Died: 19 January 1998 (aged 80)
- Original team: Abbotsford
- Height: 180 cm (5 ft 11 in)
- Weight: 80.5 kg (177 lb)

Playing career^{1}
Years	Club	Games (Goals)
1941–43, 1945–47	Collingwood	48 (1)
- ^{1} Playing statistics correct to the end of 1947.

Ron Smith (6 May 1917 – 19 January 1998) was an Australian rules footballer who played with Collingwood in the Victorian Football League (VFL).

His brother Stan also played for Collingwood.
