= Gary Neat =

Gary Francis Neat (born 27 October 1948) is an Australian business leader and company director. He is a former journalist and senior political figure.

== Early life and education ==
Neat attended Newcastle Boys' High School. He was a Chevening Scholar at the London School of Economics and Political Science and has a master's degree in management from the Norwegian School of Management.

== Career ==
Neat was a senior journalist with the Australian Broadcasting Corporation for 16 years, including assignments as a foreign correspondent in Asia during the 1970s in Indochina, Thailand, Singapore, Indonesia, India, Malaysia, Hong Kong and the Philippines and work as a political correspondent including on Nationwide. He was also a producer with the BBC in London.

Neat is a former national president of the Australian Institute of Management, of which he is a life fellow, and is chair of the ADSHAN Group.

He was a fellow of the Australian Institute of Company Directors, the Institute of Public Administration Australia (Vic) and the Australian Marketing Institute. He has been awarded five Australian Marketing Awards and was chairman of the Australian Marketing Industry Review.

In politics, Neat was state director of the Liberal Party in Queensland for seven years beginning in 1982 and directed more than 20 election campaigns. He was a member of the Liberal Party's Federal Executive and ran unsuccessfully for the Senate in 1987. He published The New Politics in 1987.

Among some 20 directorships, he was formerly a director of Greening Australia, a director of the Adult Community & Further Education Board, a director of the Joint Accreditation System for Australia & New Zealand and a vice president of the Australian Institute of International Affairs in Victoria. He was also Australia's representative on AAMO, the Asian business forum.

== Personal life ==
Neat's son Adam Gary Neat worked as a DJ under the name Adam Sky and died in 2019.
