= John D'Arcy (footballer) =

Australian rules footballer (1935–2019)

Personal information
- Full name: John D'Arcy
- Born: 22 August 1935
- Died: 29 September 2019 (aged 84)
- Original team: Oakleigh
- Height: 185 cm (6 ft 1 in)
- Weight: 86 kg (190 lb)

Playing career^{1}
Years	Club	Games (Goals)
1959	Richmond	5 (1)
- ^{1} Playing statistics correct to the end of 1959.

John D'Arcy (22 August 1935 – 29 September 2019) was an Australian rules footballer who played with Richmond in the Victorian Football League (VFL).
