= Charles Henderson (weightlifter) =

Australian weightlifter (1922–2019)

Charles Henderson (30 December 1922 – 13 September 2019) was an Australian weightlifter who competed in the 1956 Summer Olympics.
