= Joe Bertony =

French-born Australian engineer (1922–2019)

- Born: 4 March 1922; Corsica, France
- Died: 7 April 2019 (aged 97); Sydney, Australia
- Education: Naval engineering in Saint-Tropez
- Engineering career
- Discipline: Civil
- Projects: Roseville Bridge, Sydney
- Significant design: Sydney Opera House temporary works

Joseph Bertony (4 March 1922 – 7 April 2019) was a French-born Australian engineer. Trained as a naval architect, he served in the French Navy during the Second World War and, after the Fall of France, as a spy for the French intelligence services. Bertony was captured twice by the Germans and imprisoned in concentration camps and successfully escaped both times. He was awarded the Croix de Guerre for his bravery and emigrated to Australia after the war. Bertony worked as a civil engineer and played a key role in designing the temporary works that allowed construction of the Sydney Opera House sails. This entailed making more than 30,000 manual calculations with an accuracy of 0.5 inches (1.3 cm). Subsequent computer checks showed that he had not made a single error. In later life he worked on wind turbine projects and as a mentor to young engineers.

== Early life and war service ==
Bertony was born in Corsica, France on 14 March 1922. His mother died soon after the birth and he was sent by his father to be brought up by an aunt and uncle. Bertony developed an interest in mathematics and studied naval engineering at Saint-Tropez. Following the outbreak of the Second World War he joined the French Navy. Whilst there Bertony's intelligence was recognised and he was recruited as a spy.

Shortly after he began his work in intelligence he was detected and captured by the Germans, who imprisoned him in the Mauthausen-Gusen concentration camp complex in Austria. He was put to work as a forced labourer but managed to escape as a result of an administrative error made by the guards whilst he was being transported. Bertony resumed his work undercover but was arrested in Paris and sent to Buchenwald concentration camp. He was forced to make use of his technical skills, working in an underground factory producing V-1 flying bombs and V-2 rockets. Though he had little choice but to comply, Bertony remained ashamed of his role in producing these weapons for the rest of his life.

The forced labourers received very little food, being lucky to receive a loaf of bread per day between five men. Bertony had a good metabolism and would often give his allocation to other prisoners, angering the SS guards. He was sometimes put to work on farms where he was designated a "carotenfuhrer", a prisoner with responsibility for guarding silos of carrots. The prisoners were prohibited from eating the crops they harvested, and during this time Bertony survived by eating boiled grass. As "carotenfuhrer" if Bertony allowed a prisoner to eat the carrots, which he did many times, both he and the prisoner would be stripped and flogged.

Towards the end of the war, in 1945 with US forces approaching, the prisoners from Buchenwald were marched to the German-Czech border and loaded onto a cattle train. They were then taken to a remote spot to be executed by shooting. Bertony anticipated this and escaped the train in the company of another man. The two men endured ten days in the snow with no food and clad only in their thin camp uniforms. They survived to be rescued and became firm friends for the rest of their lives. Bertony was awarded the Croix de Guerre by the French government for his actions during this escape.

== Sydney Opera House ==
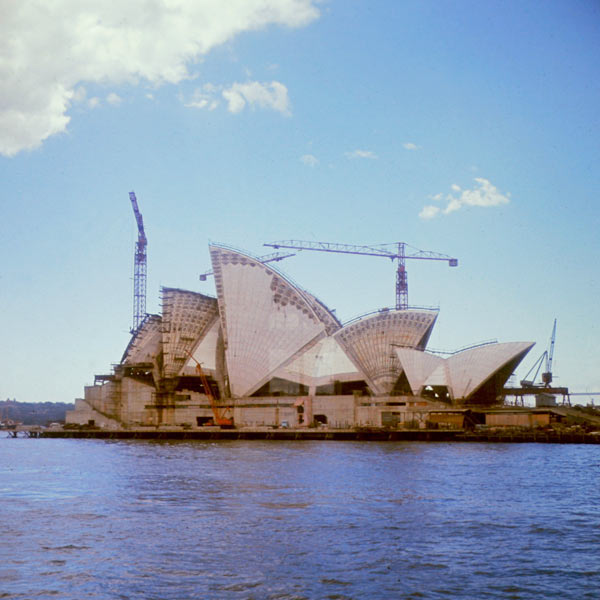
Sydney Opera House under construction in 1966

Bertony moved to Australia in 1953 to work at the uranium mines at Rum Jungle, Northern Territory. At the time Australia operated a scheme that allowed European citizens permanent residency if they secured work in the country for two years. Bertony was given a job at Hornibrook, a construction company famous for its work on bridges, that satisfied this requirement.

During the early 1960s Bertony worked on the construction of the Sydney Opera House. The building's design with a number of large "sails" made up of 22,194 pre-cast concrete segments proved challenging to construct. The segments were to be fixed in position with epoxy resin and Bertony determined that a temporary steel "erection arch" falsework would be required to support the structure in the temporary condition. Bertony settled on a mobile telescopic truss system and completed the 30,000 necessary calculations by hand in six months. The structure, which had no flat elements, was complex, and the margin of error required was 0.5 inches (1.3 cm).

The calculations had to be checked for safety, and this was carried out by computer. The only machine in the country powerful enough to do so was the IBM 7090 at the Long Range Weapons Establishment at Woomera. This was only available during night time for one week in every month. One of Bertony's colleagues, David Evans, operated the computer and reported that no errors were found in Bertony's calculations. Evans later stated that Bertony's work had greatly helped the construction programme and claimed that "it would have taken many minds and many rounds of trial and error, and a much longer time and a much bigger budget, to get those ribs in the air if Joe hadn't been there". Sydney Opera House chief executive Louise Herron also stated "Bertony was a genius. Without him, the spectacular sails might never have become a reality".

== Later life ==
After the Opera House, Bertony worked on other projects in Sydney including the Roseville Bridge in the Middle Harbour and the Pheasant's Nest Bridge over the Nepean River. Bertony donated the calculation sheets from his time on the Opera House to the Museum of Applied Arts and Sciences, and they are now held as part of the Powerhouse Museum collection. Bertony later ran calculations to prove that an earlier, more ambitious model for the opera house, one which had flatter concrete sails, had also been technically possible. In the 1990s he worked with a Scottish company to design a vertical axis wind turbine design and at the time of his death was working on a Scottish wind farm scheme.

== Personal life ==
Bertony's wife was a pianist and physiotherapist at Hornibrook. They had no children and she died in 2016. Bertony was a lover of French food and dined out regularly in Sydney's restaurants. He also held a keen interest in electric vehicles and helped to mentor young engineers. Bertony died at his home in Sydney on 7 April 2019.
