= Max Kay =

Scottish-Australian entertainer

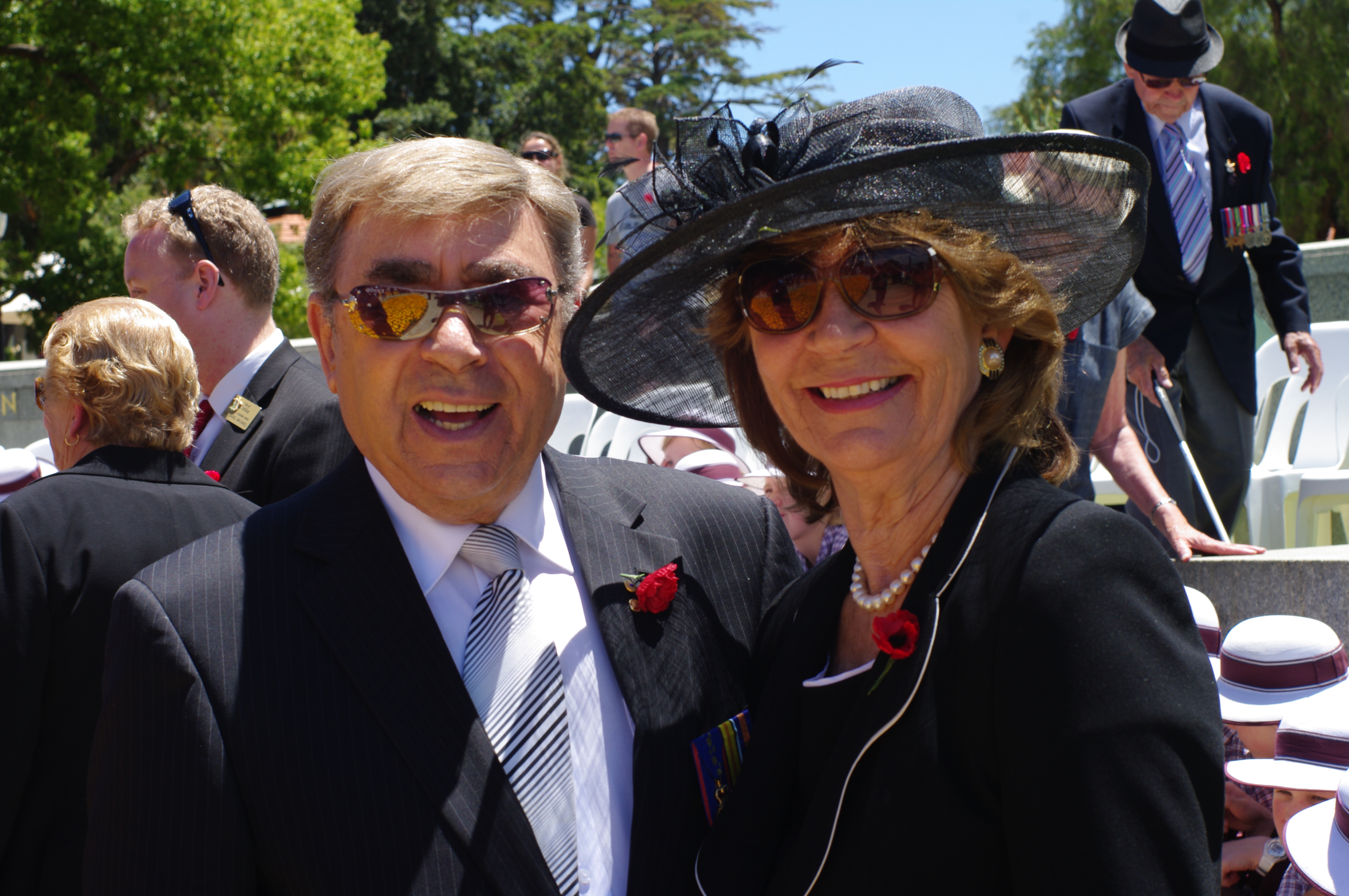
Max with his wife Norma in 2011

Max Kay AM (1936 – 4 June 2019) was an Australian entertainer, restaurateur and local politician. Born in Scotland, he moved to Perth, Western Australia in 1967, where he was known for his theatre restaurants and involvement in public life.

Kay began his career as a performer in Scotland, and toured internationally as the manager of fellow Scottish entertainer Andy Stewart. Kay emigrated to Perth in 1967. In 1976, he opened the Civic Theatre Restaurant in Inglewood, where he performed shows he wrote and produced himself. In 1980, Kay spent $1 million converting an old factory in Highgate to hold an expanded Civic Theatre, which ran until he closed it in 2001.

After moving on from the theatre restaurants he continued to perform one-man shows, but concentrated on charity work, as a councillor on the Perth City Council, and as member of several boards. He was made a Member of the Order of Australia (AM) in 2003 for his work with charities and community projects. He continued his involvement with Curtin Radio 100.1 FM well into his later years.

Kay died on 4 June 2019, at the age of 82, from complications of pneumonia. His memorial service was at His Majesty's Theatre, Perth on 22 June, and was attended by almost a thousand people. The event was opened with the Rockingham City Pipe Band playing in Hay Street, and continued in the theatre. His son, Gary Kay, gave the eulogy.
