= John Causby =

Australian cricketer (1942–2019)

Personal information
- Full name: John Phillip Causby
- Born: 27 October 1942; Hindmarsh, South Australia
- Died: 8 June 2019 (aged 76); Grange, South Australia
- Batting: Right-handed
- Role: Batsman
- Relatives: Barry Causby (cousin)

Domestic team information
- Years: Team
- 1960/61–1973/74: South Australia

Career statistics
Competition	First-class	List A
Matches	63	7
Runs scored	3,067	129
Batting average	28.93	21.50
100s/50s	3/14	0/0
Top score	137	28
Catches/stumpings	25/–	1/–
- Source: CricInfo, 10 July 2019

John Phillip Causby (27 October 1942 – 8 June 2019) was an Australian cricketer. He played 63 first-class matches for South Australia between 1960–61 and 1973–74, and played in its Sheffield Shield victories in 1968–69 and 1970–71. He also played in two premiership winning sides for Woodville District Cricket Club in 1965–66 and 1977–78.
