= Suzanne Twelftree =

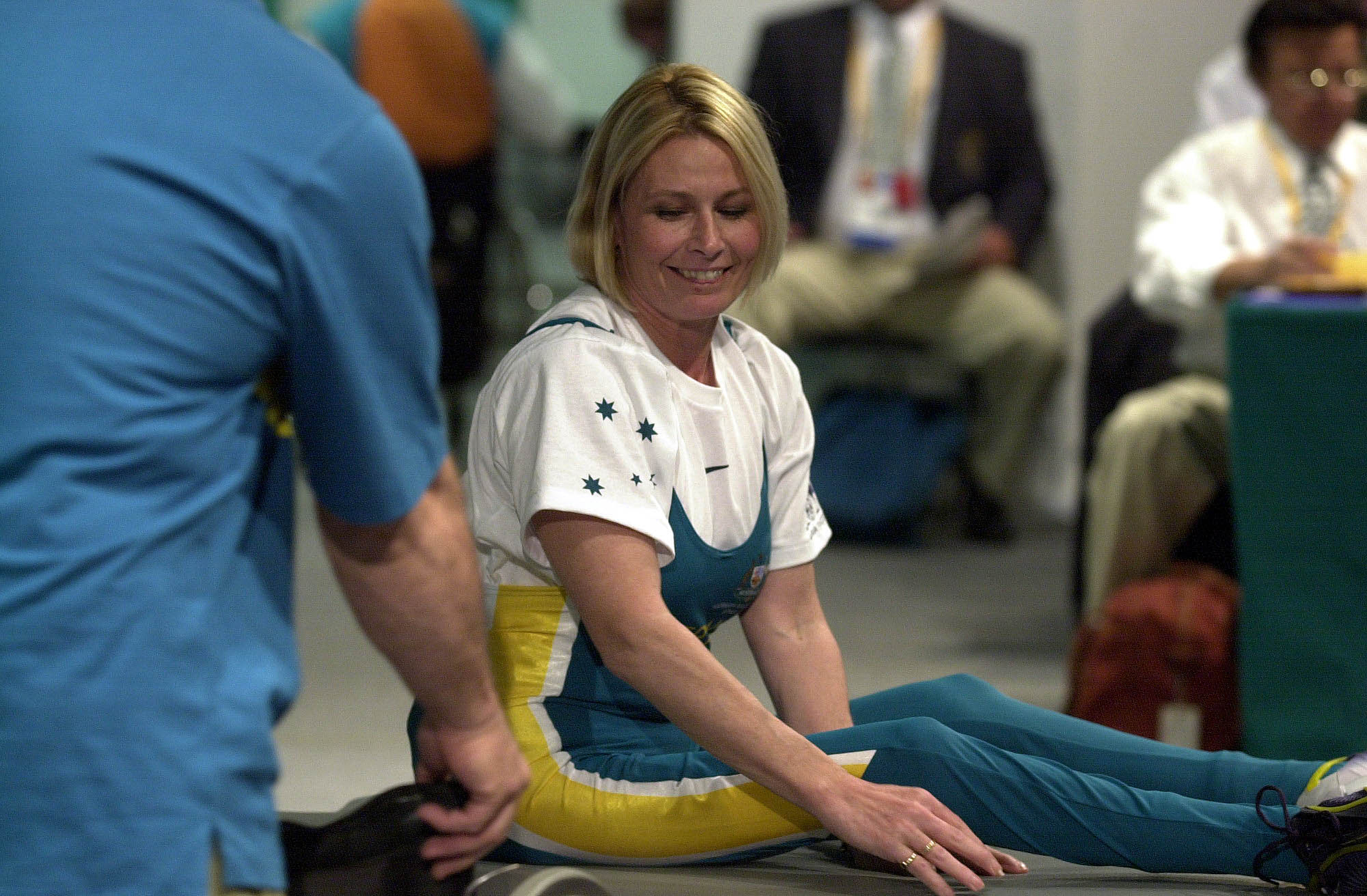
- Twelftree competing at the 2000 Sydney Paralympics
- Full name: Suzanne Twelftree
- Country (sports): Australia
- Born: 12 August 1956 Wallaroo, South Australia
- Died: 16 April 2019 (aged 62)

Suzanne Wendy Twelftree (12 August 1956 – 16 April 2019) was an Australian wheelchair tennis player and Paralympic powerlifter.

== Personal life ==
Twelftree was born on 12 August 1956 in Wallaroo, South Australia. She had three children prior to becoming a paraplegic in 1986 due to arteriovenous malformation and a surgical mishap. She lived on a farm until she moved to Adelaide, South Australia in 2005.

Twelftree has been a board member of estara (The Paraplegic and Quadriplegic Association of South Australia Ltd.).

She died on 16 April 2019 leaving behind husband Greg and children Todd, Nick and Abbey.

== Sporting career ==
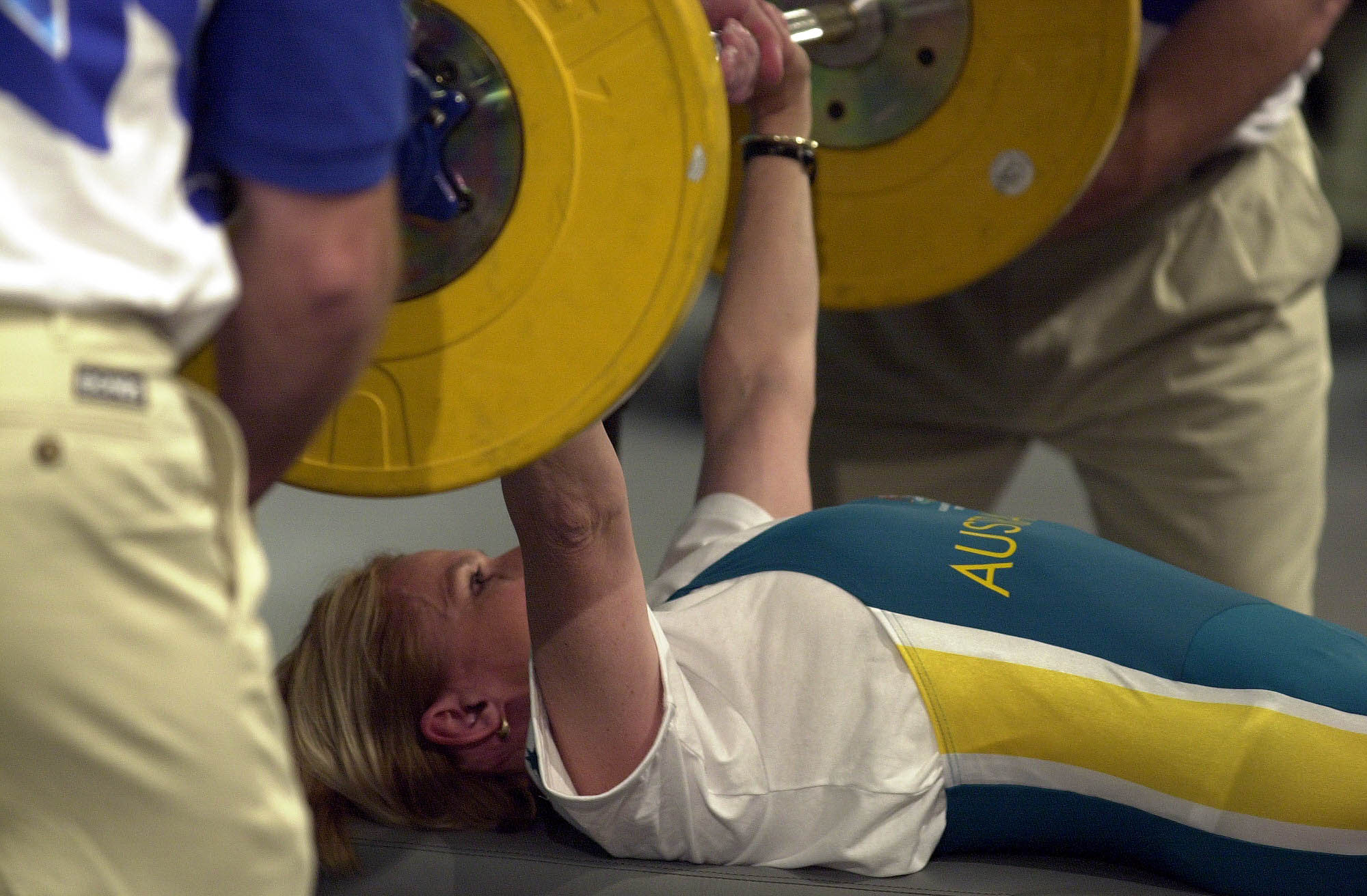
Twelftree competing at the 2000 Sydney Paralympics

After her accident, she took up wheelchair tennis and in 1991 was a member of the team that won the bronze medal at the World Team Cup in Los Angeles. At the 1992 Barcelona Paralympics, she lost in the first round of the women's singles. She partnered with Randa Hinson in the women's doubles but they lost in the first round.

At the 2000 Sydney Paralympics, she competed in the women's up to 48 kg powerlifting and finished ninth.
