= Mack Atkins =

Australian rules footballer (1931–2019)

Personal information
- Full name: Mack Anthony Atkins
- Born: 18 August 1931
- Died: 25 June 2019 (aged 87)
- Original team: Balwyn
- Height: 175 cm (5 ft 9 in)
- Weight: 76 kg (168 lb)

Playing career^{1}
Years	Club	Games (Goals)
1952–54	Hawthorn	18 (9)
- ^{1} Playing statistics correct to the end of 1954.

Mack Anthony Atkins (18 August 1931 – 25 June 2019) was an Australian rules footballer who played with Hawthorn in the Victorian Football League (VFL).
