= Lewis Cooper (cricketer) =

Australian cricketer (1937–2019)

Personal information
- Full name: Lewis Dale Cooper
- Born: 14 May 1937; Mackay, Queensland Australia
- Died: 11 April 2019 (aged 81); Brisbane, Queensland Australia
- Role: Wicket-keeper
- Source: Cricinfo, 8 May 2019

Lewis Cooper (14 May 1937 – 11 April 2019) was an Australian cricketer. He played 34 first-class matches for Queensland between 1958 and 1968.

== See also ==
- List of Queensland first-class cricketers
