= Don Howell =

Australian rules footballer (1935–2019)

Personal information
- Full name: Don Howell
- Born: 15 July 1935
- Died: 5 December 2019 (aged 84)
- Original team: Portland
- Height: 178 cm (5 ft 10 in)
- Weight: 73 kg (161 lb)
- Position: Half Forward / Wing

Playing career^{1}
Years	Club	Games (Goals)
1953–55	St Kilda	29 (9)
1957–58	Collingwood	17 (2)
Total		46 (11)
- ^{1} Playing statistics correct to the end of 1958.

Don Howell (15 July 1935 – 5 December 2019) was an Australian rules footballer who played with St Kilda and Collingwood in the Victorian Football League (VFL).
