= Peter Hitchcock (nature conservationist) =

Australian nature conservationist (1944–2019)

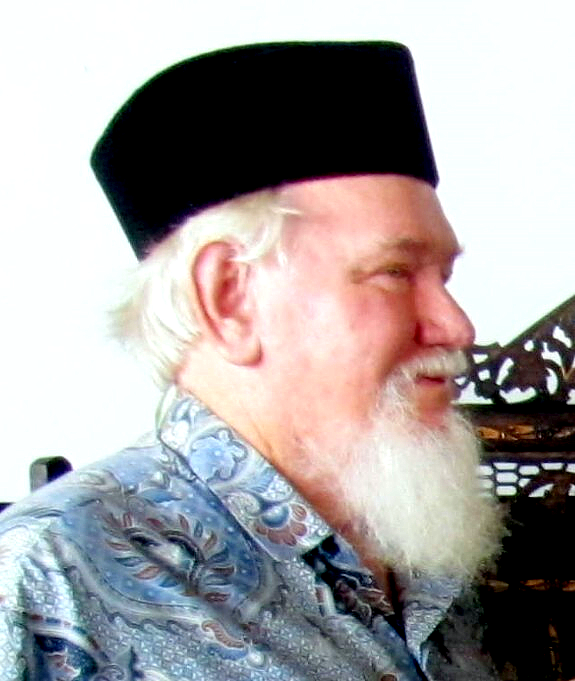
- Peter Hitchcock August 2015
- Born: 1944; Australia
- Died: 20 May 2019 (aged 74–75); Cairns, Queensland, Australia
- Citizenship: Australian
- Occupation: IUCN World Heritage expert
- Known for: World Heritage nature conservation
- Board member of: Australian Heritage Commission

Peter Phillip Hitchcock AM (1944 – May 20, 2019) was a renowned Australian champion for nature conservation who played a key role establishing some of Australia's first rainforest protected areas, also overseeing nationally and internationally significant UNESCO World Heritage nominations plus World Heritage protected area management. Hitchcock served as the first executive director of the Wet Tropics Management Authority (WTMA).
