= John Wilson (Australian footballer) =

Australian rules footballer (1940–2019)

Personal information
- Born: 18 May 1940
- Died: 15 June 2019 (aged 79)
- Original team: Melbourne High School
- Height: 175 cm (5 ft 9 in)
- Weight: 73 kg (161 lb)

Playing career^{1}
Years	Club	Games (Goals)
1959	Richmond	6 (2)
- ^{1} Playing statistics correct to the end of 1959.

Career highlights
- Richmond Thirds premiership player 1958

John Wilson (18 May 1940 – 15 June 2019) was an Australian rules football player who played in the Victorian Football League (VFL) in 1959 for the Richmond Football Club. He played in six AFL games during his career.
