= Stan Smith (Australian footballer, born 1925) =

Australian rules footballer (1925–2019)

Personal information
- Full name: Stan Smith
- Born: 17 April 1925
- Died: 8 June 2019 (aged 94)
- Original team: Collingwood Juniors
- Height: 175 cm (5 ft 9 in)
- Weight: 73 kg (161 lb)

Playing career^{1}
Years	Club	Games (Goals)
1947–50	Collingwood	46 (25)
- ^{1} Playing statistics correct to the end of 1950.

Stan Smith (17 April 1925 – 8 June 2019) was an Australian rules footballer who played with Collingwood in the Victorian Football League (VFL).

His brother Ron also played for Collingwood.
