= Brian Kann =

Australian rules footballer (1933–2019)

Personal information
- Full name: Brian Eugene Kann
- Born: 21 July 1933
- Died: 21 May 2019 (aged 85)
- Original team: Hawthorn Colts
- Debut: Round 13, 1954, Hawthorn vs. St Kilda, at Glenferrie Oval
- Height: 178 cm (5 ft 10 in)
- Weight: 82 kg (181 lb)

Playing career^{1}
Years	Club	Games (Goals)
1954–1959	Hawthorn	57 (0)
- ^{1} Playing statistics correct to the end of 1959.

Career highlights
- Hawthorn Football Club Hall of Fame

Brian Kann (21 July 1933 – 21 May 2019) was an Australian rules footballer who played with Hawthorn in the Victorian Football League (VFL).

Kann, who went to Melbourne High School, started out in the Hawthorn Colts. He played senior football at Hawthorn for six seasons, from 1954 to 1959. A defender, Kann was part of Hawthorn's historic 1957 side, which qualified for the VFL finals for the first time in the club's history. He played in Hawthorn's semi final win over Carlton and preliminary final loss to Melbourne. Over the next two years, Kann made only seven league appearances, but did captain the Hawthorn reserves to the 1958 and 1959 premierships.

In 1960, Kann was captain-coach of Moorabbin, which finished the regular season in sixth position, to make the Victorian Football Association finals. They were eliminated from the finals by Yarraville, at the quarter-final stage.

Also a district cricketer, Kann played for the Fitzroy Cricket Club and in his youth represented the Victorian Schoolboys. He was a member of Fitzroy's 1953/54 premiership side.

In 1995, his son Julien Kann was initiator and founder of the Munich Kangaroos in Germany, as well as founding member of the Australian Football League Germany in 1999.
