= Neil Davey =

Australian public servant (1921–2019)

Neil Davey AO
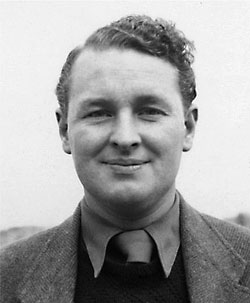
- Born: Neil William Davey; 2 February 1921; Wangaratta, Victoria, Australia
- Died: 5 July 2019 (aged 98); Canberra, Australia
- Other name: Mr. Decimal
- Education: Frankston High School; University of Melbourne (BComm (Hons)); London School of Economics (PhD)
- Organization: The Australian Department of the Treasury
- Known for: CEO & Secretary of the Decimal Currency Board
- Spouse: Maria Vrachnas (m. 1948; died 2019)
- Children: 2

Neil William Davey AO (2 February 1921 – 5 July 2019) was an Australian public servant who oversaw Australia's transition from pounds, shillings and pence to decimal currency. He has been referred to in the media as Australia's "Mr. Decimal".

== Early life, education, and military service ==
Neil William Davey was born in Wangaratta, Victoria, Australia, on 2 February 1921. He left school when he was 14, and went to work as a telegraph messenger. In 1938 he became a telegraphist at the Melbourne Central Telegraph Office.

During the Second World War he enlisted in the Australian Army at Prahran, Victoria, on 27 May 1941. He transferred to the Second Australian Imperial Force on 22 August 1942, and was allotted the service number VX106930. He served with Southern Command Signals, III Corps Signals, and the 8th Telegraph Operating Section. It was with this last unit that he embarked from Brisbane for overseas service on 13 November 1944. He served at Hollandia, and on Morotai, and was promoted to corporal on 17 January 1945. He returned to Australia on 9 April 1946, and was discharged from the Army on 16 April. For his service, he was awarded the 1939–1945 Star, the Pacific Star, the War Medal and the Australia Service Medal.

Davey married Maria Vrachnas on 8 December 1948. The wedding ceremony was conducted in Greek Orthodox tradition, and both would later recall that "they did not understand a word of it". They had two sons together, Nicholas and Stephen. He enrolled in night school at the University of Melbourne, from which he graduated in 1950 with a Bachelor of Commerce (equal 1st class Honours). He completed his Doctor of Philosophy in the Faculty of Economics at the London School of Economics in 1957 under the supervision of Richard Sidney Sayers. His field of study was the history of monetary thought and his PhD dissertation was titled The Decimal Coinage Controversy in England.

== Decimal currency work ==
In an Australian Financial Review article dated 12 February 2016, "How a New Currency Reflected the Confidence of a Nation", Selwyn Cornish, official historian of the Reserve Bank of Australia and honorary associate professor in the Research School of Economics at the Australian National University, stated "Davey was responsible for two critical decisions. Against the advice of some of his superiors in the Treasury, who argued in favour of basing the new currency on the pound (20 shillings), Davey took a contrary view, arguing that 10 shillings be used as the base. With 12 pence to the shilling, and using 10 shillings as the base for the new currency, one cent would be equivalent to 1.2 pence. In contrast, using the pound as the base, a cent would be worth 2.4 pence. Davey regarded this to be too high. It would give rise to higher prices and would probably require the circulation of a half-cent coin. As with the naming of the new currency, common sense prevailed. Davey was also successful in arguing that owners of cash registers and other accounting machines should be subsidised for the cost of converting their machines to the decimal system. This, too, assisted the smooth transfer to the new currency.

On 2 May 1969, Sir Walter D. Scott wrote to Treasurer William McMahon:

Of the Board staff, every Member of both the Decimal Currency Committee and the Decimal Currency Board would undoubtedly confirm that as Secretary of both, Dr. Neil Davey made an outstanding contribution. At the Board, from 1963 to 1966, Dr. Davey carried a major part of the intensive planning, organisation and administration that characterised the Changeover, especially in the key years 1965–66. Moreover, he exhibited the personal qualities needed to produce the best from the Board's staff. It would be difficult for me to imagine anybody quite matching the example he set and the degree of effectiveness he achieved. I cannot speak too highly of Dr. Davey's contribution to any success the Changeover achieved.

In October 2015, Terry Larkin (Principal Private Secretary to the Treasurer Harold Holt 1960 and 1962) stated: "Neil’s superior intellectual and managerial gifts applied to public service at the highest level of government give Neil a lasting place in the economic history of Australia – most notably in the 'nation building' event of Australia’s change to its own, unique decimal currency in February 1966 – and before and afterwards in the direction and expansion of Australia’s overseas economic and financial relations, especially in Asia." On 10 August 2015, the Director General of the National Archives of Australia, David Fricker, referred to Davey's thesis as the "foundation document" upon which the national change to decimal currency was based.

Davey served as Minister (Financial) at the Australian High Commission in London from 1974 to 1979. He then became the Australian Director on the Board of the Asian Development Bank, based in Manila in the Philippines.

== Later years and death ==
Davey retired in February 1984, and was appointed chairman of the Asian Development Fund Committee, a post he held for four years. He was made an Officer of the Order of Australia in the 2016 Queen's Birthday Honours.

Davey died at Calvary Hospital, Canberra, on 5 July 2019. His wife, Maria, had died five days earlier.
