= Brian Rhodes (cricketer) =

Australian cricketer (1951–2019)

Personal information
- Born: 7 March 1951; Sydney, Australia
- Died: 28 June 2019 (aged 68)
- Source: ESPNcricinfo, 17 January 2017

Brian Rhodes (7 March 1951 – 28 June 2019) was an Australian cricketer. He played one first-class match for New South Wales in 1971/72.

== See also ==
- List of New South Wales representative cricketers
