= Ian Johnson (businessman) =

Australian businessman (1949–2019)

Ian Johnson (March 1949 – 26 June 2019) was an Australian businessman.

Originally a long-time senior executive at the Nine Network (GTV-9), in October 2003 Johnson moved to the Seven Network to become managing director of Channel Seven Melbourne.

Johnson died in June 2019 aged 70.
