= Annalise Braakensiek =

Australian model and actress (1972–2019)

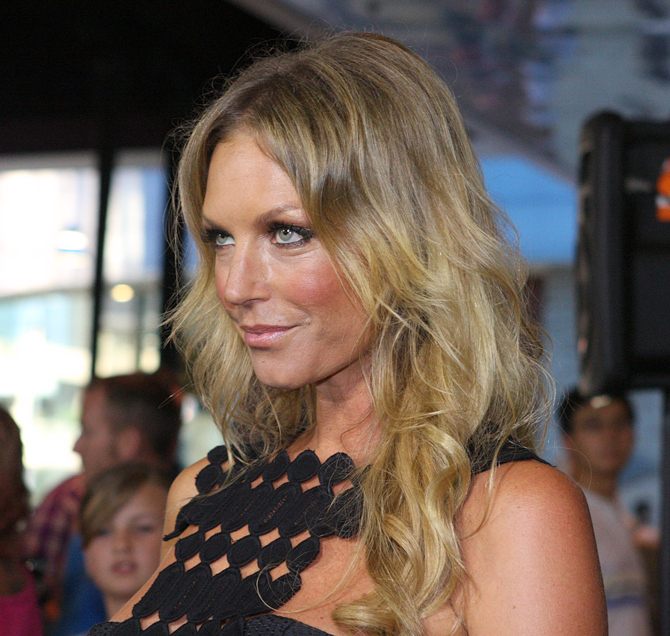
- Braakensiek in 2012
- Born: 9 December 1972; Sydney, New South Wales, Australia
- Died: 6 January 2019 (aged 46); Potts Point, New South Wales, Australia
- Occupations: Model; actress; TV presenter; businesswoman; campaign ambassador
- Years active: 1996–2019
- Spouse: Danny Goldberg (m. 2002; div. 2018)

Annalise Braakensiek (/ˈbrækənsɪk/ BRAK-ən-sik; 9 December 1972 – 6 January 2019) was an Australian model and actress.

== Life and career ==
Braakensiek had a successful career as a model, with some acting work, for over twenty-five years. She told the Daily Telegraph in 2017 that she had never really wanted to be a model. She said that she had deferred her university studies, thinking she would do modelling for a year, but was still doing it 25 years later. She also worked as a jewellery and lingerie designer, and was a vegan blogger as well as creating the catering company Love Lunch. Braakensiek graced the covers and pages of magazines including FHM, Maxim and GQ.

Braakensiek became an ambassador for Australian mental health charity R U OK?. In 2017, she talked about her battles with depression following the deaths of people close to her, adding that at times she "couldn't get out of bed". Especially significant was the 2004 death of her father, Odd Karlsen, with whom she had reconnected in 1993 after being estranged from him for some time.

Braakensiek married stockbroker Danny Goldberg in 2002. The couple separated in 2018. A friend who had known Braakensiek since the early 1990s said there was a side to her that was "just a sadness". He said that Braakensiek took her marriage breakup very hard and felt she had failed. It plunged her into a dark place.

== Death ==
Braakensiek was found dead in her Potts Point apartment, which she had bought in 2018, on 6 January 2019, aged 46, after friends and family had not heard from her for several days. Police said there were no suspicious circumstances.

On 16 January 2019, a memorial service for Braakensiek was held at Bondi Beach at 6am. The service was attended by hundreds of people, including her mother, her brother and sister, her estranged husband Danny Goldberg and other family and friends.

=== Aftermath ===
In the weeks following Braakensiek's death, her friends and family were disputing the theory that she may have died by suicide. They painted a picture of an active woman who was excited about future activities and showed no signs of depression, and friends speculate that she may have taken an accidental overdose of sleeping tablets. Braakensiek's will was revealed in September 2019, the bulk of the estate going to friends and family.

== Selected filmography ==
=== Film ===
- Fat Pizza (2003) as Claudia Macpherson
- Mr. Accident (2000) as Fay

=== Television ===
- Sleuth 101 (2010) as Courtney Nash (1 episode)
- Play Your Cards Right (2002–2003) as Dolly Dealer (2 episodes)
- Pizza (2000) as Claudia Macpherson (30 episodes)
- Home and Away (1998) as Lise (1 episode)
- Heartbreak High (1997) as Stephanie (1 episode)
