= Ian Drohan =

Australian rules footballer (1932–2019)

Personal information
- Full name: Ian Drohan
- Born: 22 August 1932
- Died: 28 July 2019 (aged 86)
- Original team: Camden
- Height: 173 cm (5 ft 8 in)
- Weight: 73 kg (161 lb)

Playing career^{1}
Years	Club	Games (Goals)
1955	St Kilda	3 (0)
- ^{1} Playing statistics correct to the end of 1955.

Ian Drohan (born 22 August 1932 – 28 July 2019) was an Australian rules footballer who played with St Kilda in the Victorian Football League (VFL).
