= Adam Sky (Australian DJ) =

Australian dance music DJ (1977–2019)

Adam Gary Neat (1977 – 4 May 2019), known professionally as Modium and later as Adam Sky, was an Australian dance music DJ.

== Early life and education ==
Neat was from Melbourne and was the son of Gary Neat, a businessman and politician who was formerly a journalist with the Australian Broadcasting Corporation.

== Career ==
Neat worked in information technology, including as an entrepreneur, before focusing on his DJ career. Based in Singapore, Adam Sky was ranked third most popular DJ in Asia. He worked with acts including Fatboy Slim, The Scissor Sisters, David Guetta, Afrojack, and Taio Cruz, had several signed tracks, and had a large number of tracks chart in the Top 100 and Top 10. He was resident DJ at several clubs starting in 2011 as Modium with Hedkandi's Ministry of Sound events; since moving to Singapore he referred to Altimate in 1-Altitude in Raffles Place as his "home base". He also hosted a radio show with more than a million listeners each month, The Guestlist or Guest List Radio, and in March 2018 founded Jupiter Labs, a talent agency incorporating a production facility called Titan Studio, in Singapore.

== Private life and death ==
Sky was married to Marvie Jean Tejada. Sky died on 4 May 2019 at the age of 42 at the Hillstone Villas resort in South Kuta, Bali, Indonesia. His assistant Zoia Lukiantceva fell approximately 10 metres (33 ft) from a terrace and broke her leg; Sky apparently rushed to help her while drunk and was discovered the next day near the bathroom of the vacant villa below the one in which they were staying with another friend, having bled to death after cutting his arm on the window.
