= 1948 in the United States =

- Decades: 1920s; 1930s; 1940s; 1950s; 1960s
- See also: History of the United States (1945–1964); Timeline of United States history (1930–1949); List of years in the United States

Events from the year 1948 in the United States.

== Incumbents ==
=== Federal government ===
- President: Harry S. Truman (D–Missouri)
- Vice President: vacant
- Chief Justice: Fred M. Vinson (Kentucky)
- Speaker of the House of Representatives: Joseph William Martin Jr. (R–Massachusetts)
- Senate Majority Leader: Wallace H. White Jr. (R–Maine)
- Congress: 80th

==== State governments ====
Governors and lieutenant governors

=== Governors ===
- Governor of Alabama: Jim Folsom (Democratic)
- Governor of Arizona: Sidney Preston Osborn (Democratic) (until May 25), Dan Edward Garvey (Democratic) (starting May 25)
- Governor of Arkansas: Benjamin Travis Laney (Democratic)
- Governor of California: Earl Warren (Republican)
- Governor of Colorado: William Lee Knous (Democratic)
- Governor of Connecticut: James L. McConaughy (Republican) (until March 7), James C. Shannon (Republican) (starting March 7)
- Governor of Delaware: Walter W. Bacon (Republican)
- Governor of Florida: Millard F. Caldwell (Democratic)
- Governor of Georgia: Melvin E. Thompson (Democratic) (until November 17), Herman Talmadge (Democratic) (starting November 17)
- Governor of Idaho: C. A. Robins (Republican)
- Governor of Illinois: Dwight H. Green (Republican)
- Governor of Indiana: Ralph F. Gates (Republican)
- Governor of Iowa: Robert D. Blue (Republican)
- Governor of Kansas: Frank Carlson (Republican)
- Governor of Kentucky: Earle C. Clements (Democratic)
- Governor of Louisiana: Jimmie H. Davis (Democratic) (until May 11), Earl K. Long (Democratic) (starting May 11)
- Governor of Maine: Horace A. Hildreth (Republican)
- Governor of Maryland: William Preston Lane Jr. (Democratic)
- Governor of Massachusetts: Robert F. Bradford (Republican)
- Governor of Michigan: Kim Sigler (Republican)
- Governor of Minnesota: Luther W. Youngdahl (Republican)
- Governor of Mississippi: Fielding L. Wright (Democratic)
- Governor of Missouri: Phil M. Donnelly (Democratic)
- Governor of Montana: Sam C. Ford (Republican)
- Governor of Nebraska: Val Peterson (Republican)
- Governor of Nevada: Vail M. Pittman (Democratic)
- Governor of New Hampshire: Charles M. Dale (Republican)
- Governor of New Jersey: Alfred E. Driscoll (Republican)
- Governor of New Mexico: Thomas J. Mabry (Democratic)
- Governor of New York: Thomas Dewey (Republican)
- Governor of North Carolina: R. Gregg Cherry (Democratic)
- Governor of North Dakota: Fred G. Aandahl (Republican)
- Governor of Ohio: Thomas J. Herbert (Republican)
- Governor of Oklahoma: Roy J. Turner (Democratic)
- Governor of Oregon: John H. Hall (Republican)
- Governor of Pennsylvania: James H. Duff (Republican)
- Governor of Rhode Island: John Orlando Pastore (Democratic)
- Governor of South Carolina: Strom Thurmond (Democratic)
- Governor of South Dakota: George T. Mickelson (Republican)
- Governor of Tennessee: Jim Nance McCord (Democratic)
- Governor of Texas: Beauford H. Jester (Democratic)
- Governor of Utah: Herbert B. Maw (Democratic)
- Governor of Vermont: Ernest W. Gibson Jr. (Republican)
- Governor of Virginia: William M. Tuck (Democratic)
- Governor of Washington: Monrad C. Wallgren (Democratic)
- Governor of West Virginia: Clarence W. Meadows (Democratic)
- Governor of Wisconsin: Oscar Rennebohm (Republican)
- Governor of Wyoming: Lester C. Hunt (Democratic)

=== Lieutenant governors ===
- Lieutenant Governor of Alabama: James C. Inzer (Democratic)
- Lieutenant Governor of Arkansas: Nathan Green Gordon (Democratic)
- Lieutenant Governor of California: Goodwin Knight (Republican)
- Lieutenant Governor of Colorado: Homer Pearson (Republican)
- Lieutenant Governor of Connecticut: James C. Shannon (Republican) (until month and day unknown), Robert E. Parsons (Republican) (starting month and day unknown)
- Lieutenant Governor of Delaware: Elbert N. Carvel (Democratic)
- Lieutenant Governor of Georgia: vacant (until November 17), Marvin Griffin (Democratic) (starting November 17)
- Lieutenant Governor of Idaho: Donald S. Whitehead (Republican)
- Lieutenant Governor of Illinois: Hugh W. Cross (Republican)
- Lieutenant Governor of Indiana:
  - until January 10: Richard T. James (Republican)
  - January 10-April 14: vacant
  - starting April 14: Rue J. Alexander (Republican)
- Lieutenant Governor of Iowa: Kenneth A. Evans (Republican)
- Lieutenant Governor of Kansas: Frank L. Hagaman (Republican)
- Lieutenant Governor of Kentucky: Lawrence Wetherby (Democratic)
- Lieutenant Governor of Louisiana: J. Emile Verret (Democratic) (until May 11), William J. Dodd (Democratic) (starting May 11)
- Lieutenant Governor of Massachusetts: Arthur W. Coolidge (Republican)
- Lieutenant Governor of Michigan: Eugene C. Keyes (Republican)
- Lieutenant Governor of Minnesota: C. Elmer Anderson (Republican)
- Lieutenant Governor of Mississippi: vacant (until month and day unknown), Sam Lumpkin (Democratic) (starting month and day unknown)
- Lieutenant Governor of Missouri: Walter Naylor Davis (Democratic)
- Lieutenant Governor of Montana: Ernest T. Eaton (Republican)
- Lieutenant Governor of Nebraska: Robert B. Crosby (Republican)
- Lieutenant Governor of Nevada: Clifford A. Jones (Democratic)
- Lieutenant Governor of New Mexico: Joseph Montoya (Democratic)
- Lieutenant Governor of New York: Joseph R. Hanley (Republican)
- Lieutenant Governor of North Carolina: Lynton Y. Ballentine (Democratic)
- Lieutenant Governor of North Dakota: Clarence P. Dahl (Republican)
- Lieutenant Governor of Ohio: Paul M. Herbert (Republican)
- Lieutenant Governor of Oklahoma: James E. Berry (Democratic)
- Lieutenant Governor of Pennsylvania: Daniel B. Strickler (Republican)
- Lieutenant Governor of Rhode Island: John S. McKiernan (Democratic)
- Lieutenant Governor of South Carolina: George Bell Timmerman Jr. (Democratic)
- Lieutenant Governor of South Dakota: Sioux K. Grigsby (Republican)
- Lieutenant Governor of Tennessee: George Oliver Benton (Democratic)
- Lieutenant Governor of Texas: Allan Shivers (Democratic)
- Lieutenant Governor of Vermont: Lee E. Emerson (Republican)
- Lieutenant Governor of Virginia: Lewis Preston Collins II (Democratic)
- Lieutenant Governor of Washington: Victor A. Meyers (Democratic)
- Lieutenant Governor of Wisconsin: Oscar Rennebohm (Republican)

== Events ==
=== January ===
- January 17 – The latest New Jersey State Constitution goes into effect.
- January 29 – Plane crash at Los Gatos Creek, California kills 4 US citizens and 28 deportees, commemorated in a song by Woody Guthrie.

=== February ===
- February 1 – The Soviet Union begins to jam Voice of America broadcasts.
- February 21 – The stock car racing organization NASCAR is founded by Bill France Sr. with other drivers meeting at the Streamline Hotel, Daytona Beach, Florida.

=== March ===
- March 8 – McCollum v. Board of Education: The United States Supreme Court rules that religious instruction in public schools violates the U.S. Constitution.
- March 17 – The Hells Angels motorcycle gang is founded in California.
- March 20:
  - Renowned Italian conductor Arturo Toscanini makes his television debut, conducting the NBC Symphony Orchestra in an all-Wagner program.
  - The 20th Academy Awards ceremony, hosted by Agnes Moorehead and Dick Powell, is held at Shrine Auditorium in Los Angeles. Elia Kazan's Gentleman's Agreement receives the most nominations with eight and ties with George Seaton's Miracle on 34th Street in winning the most awards with three, including Best Motion Picture and Best Director for Kazan.

=== April ===
April 30: OAS

- April 3:
  - President Harry S. Truman signs the Marshall Plan, which authorizes $15 billion in aid for 16 countries.
  - Ludwig van Beethoven's Ninth Symphony is played on television in its entirety for the first time, in a concert featuring Arturo Toscanini conducting the NBC Symphony Orchestra. The chorus is conducted by Robert Shaw.
- April 19 – The ABC television network begins broadcasting.
- April 22 – WTVR begins television services. WTVR is the first TV station south of Washington D.C., giving it the nickname "The South's First Television station".
- April 30 – 21 American countries sign the Charter of the Organization of American States establishing the Organization of American States (in effect December 1, 1951).

=== May ===
- May 14 – The United States recognizes Israel as a country.
- May 17 – The Dewey–Stassen debate, the first audio-recorded presidential primary debate, is broadcast on the radio.
- May 19 – Mundt–Nixon Bill of 1948 passes the House (but soon after fails to reach a Senate vote. In 1950, the Mundt–Ferguson Communist Registration Bill also fails to pass both chambers–but many parts go into the McCarran Internal Security Act, which passed in 1950)
- May 26 – The U.S. Congress passes Public Law 557, which permanently establishes the Civil Air Patrol as the auxiliary of the United States Air Force.
- May 27 – Walt Disney Productions' tenth feature film, Melody Time, is released. It is Disney's fifth of six package films to be released through the 1940s.
- May 30 – A dike along the Columbia River breaks, obliterating Vanport, Oregon within minutes: 15 people die and tens of thousands are left homeless.

=== June ===
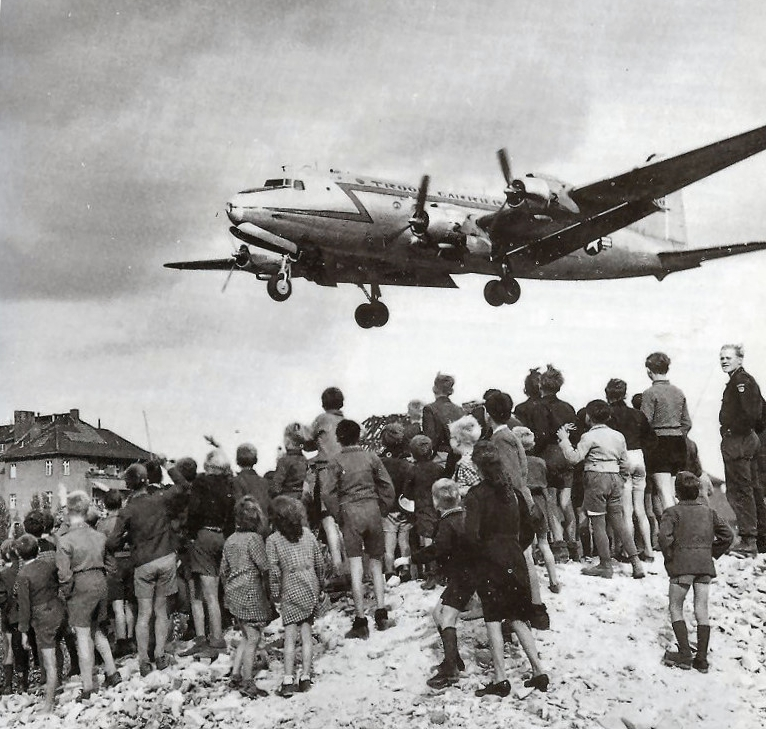
June 24: Berlin Airlift

- June 3 – The Palomar Observatory telescope is finished in California.
- June 11 – The first monkey astronaut, Albert I, is launched into space from White Sands, New Mexico.
- June 12:
  - MCWR renamed Women Marines.
  - Women in the Air Force (WAF) created.
- June 17 – A Douglas DC-6 carrying United Air Lines Flight 624 crashes near Mount Carmel, Pennsylvania, killing all 43 people on board.
- June 20 – The U.S. Congress recesses for the remainder of 1948, after an overtime session closes at 7:00 a.m. D.C. time (to be shortly interrupted by Truman's recall from Congressional recess for July 20, 1948).
- June 21–25 – 1948 Republican National Convention (Philadelphia)
- June 24 – The Berlin Blockade begins; in response, the U.S. orders the launch of Operation Vittles, the U.S. action of the Berlin Airlift.
- June 26 – Shirley Jackson's short story "The Lottery" is published in The New Yorker magazine.
- June 28 – David Lean's Oliver Twist, based on Charles Dickens's famous novel, premieres in the UK. It is banned for 3 years in the U.S. because of alleged anti-Semitism in depicting master criminal Fagin, played by Alec Guinness.

=== July ===
- July 12–14 – 1948 Democratic National Convention (Philadelphia)
- July 17 – Dixiecrat National Convention (Birmingham)
- July 20 – Cold War: President Harry S. Truman issues the second peacetime military draft in the United States, amid increasing tensions with the Soviet Union (the first peacetime draft occurred in 1940 under President Roosevelt).
- July 23–25 – 1948 Progressive National Convention (Philadelphia)
- July 26:
  - U.S. President Truman signs Executive Order 9981, ending racial segregation in the United States Armed Forces.
  - Turnip Day Session – Truman exhorts 80th United States Congress to pass legislation
- July 31:
  - At Idlewild Field in New York City, New York International Airport (later renamed John F. Kennedy International Airport) is dedicated.
  - Elizabeth Bentley testifies before HUAC

=== August ===
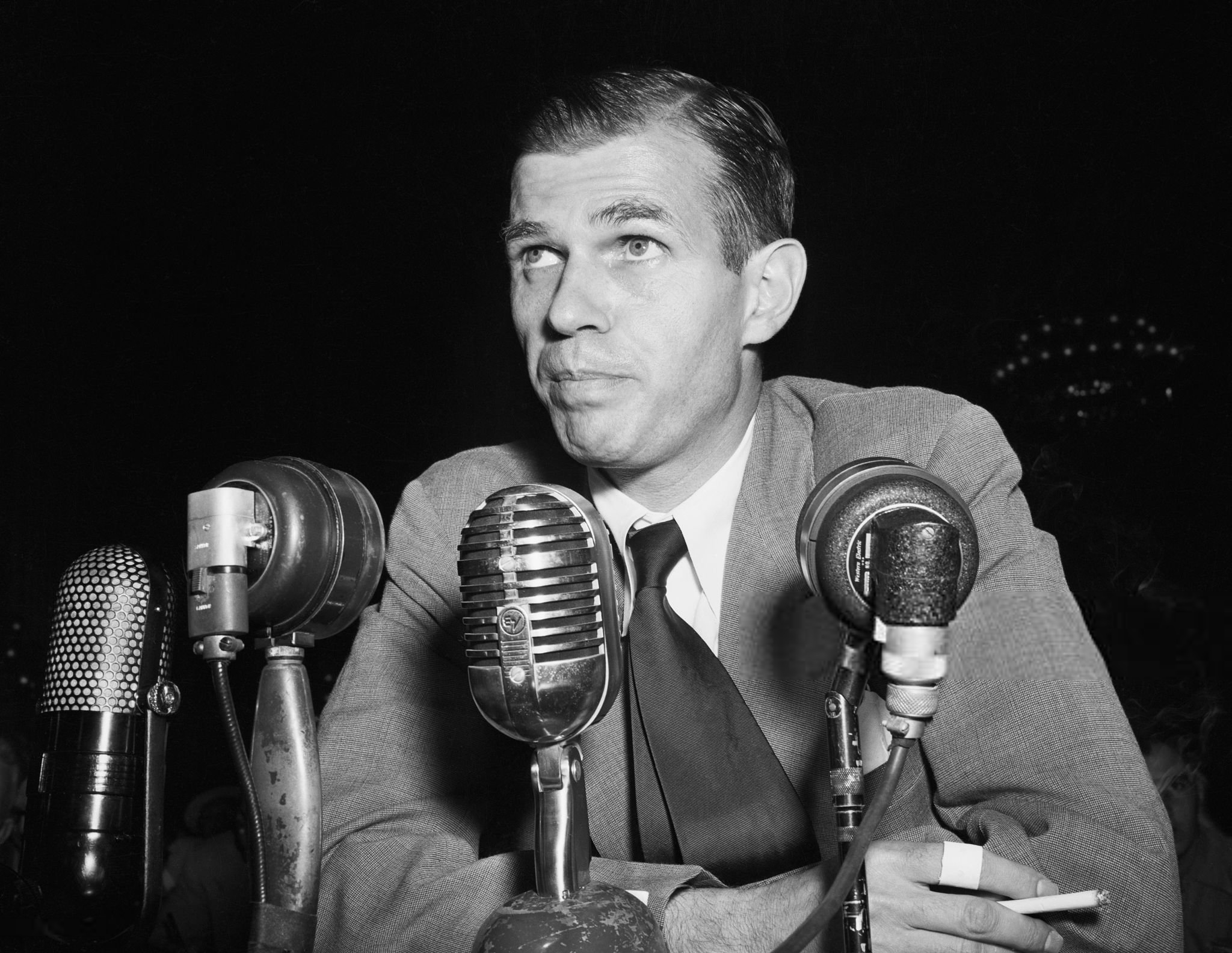
August 3: Alger Hiss is accused of being a Communist

- August 1 – The U.S. Air Force Office of Special Investigations is founded.
- August 3 – In an appearance before the House Un-American Activities Committee (HUAC), Whittaker Chambers, a senior editor at Time magazine and a former Communist, accuses Alger Hiss of having been a member of "an underground organization of the United States Communist Party".
- August 25 – The House Un-American Activities Committee holds its first-ever televised congressional hearing, featuring "Confrontation Day" between Whittaker Chambers and Alger Hiss.

=== September ===
- September 13 – Margaret Chase Smith of Maine is elected to the U.S. Senate, becoming the first woman to serve in both chambers of the U.S. Congress.
- September 29 – Laurence Olivier's Hamlet opens in the United States.

=== October ===
- October 1 – National Guard Bureau made a Bureau of the Department of the United States Army and an Agency of the Dept. of the Air Force.
- October 8 – WMAQ-TV first airs in Chicago.
- October 11 – The Cleveland Indians defeat the Boston Braves to win the World Series in baseball, 4 games to 2.
- October 16 – The 57th Street Art Fair, the oldest juried art fair in the American Midwest, is founded in Chicago.
- October 26 – Killer smog settles into Donora, Pennsylvania.

=== November ===
- November 2 – 1948 United States presidential election: Democratic incumbent Harry S. Truman defeats Republican Thomas E. Dewey and 'Dixiecrat' Strom Thurmond.

=== December ===
- December 4 – The 6.3 M_{L} Desert Hot Springs earthquake affected Southern California with a maximum Mercalli intensity of VII (Very strong), causing minor damage and several injuries.
- December 10 – The Universal Declaration of Human Rights (UDHR) is adopted by the United Nations General Assembly at the Palais de Chaillot in Paris.
- December 15 – The United States Department of Justice indicts Alger Hiss on two counts of perjury.

=== Undated ===
- The Fresh Kills Landfill, the world's largest, opens in Staten Island, New York.
- The first of the Kinsey Reports, Sexual Behavior in the Human Male, is published.
- Charles Lazarus starts Children's Supermart, the predecessor of Toys "R" Us, in Washington, D.C. as a baby-furniture retailer.

=== Ongoing ===
- Cold War (1947–1991)
- Second Red Scare (1947–1957)
- Marshall Plan (1948–1951)

== Births ==
=== January ===
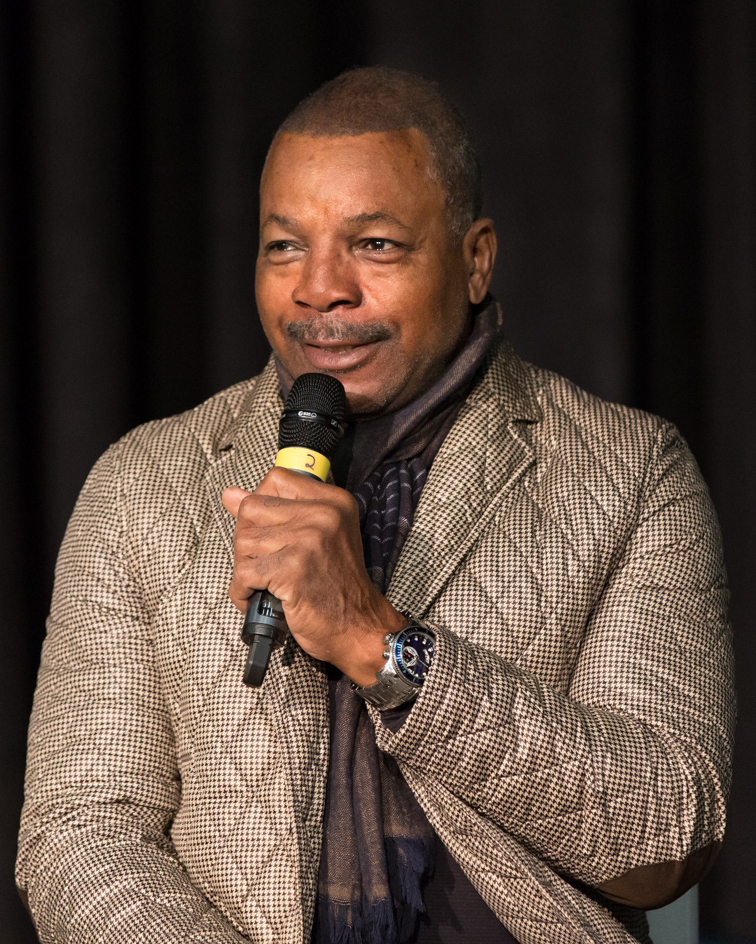
Carl Weathers

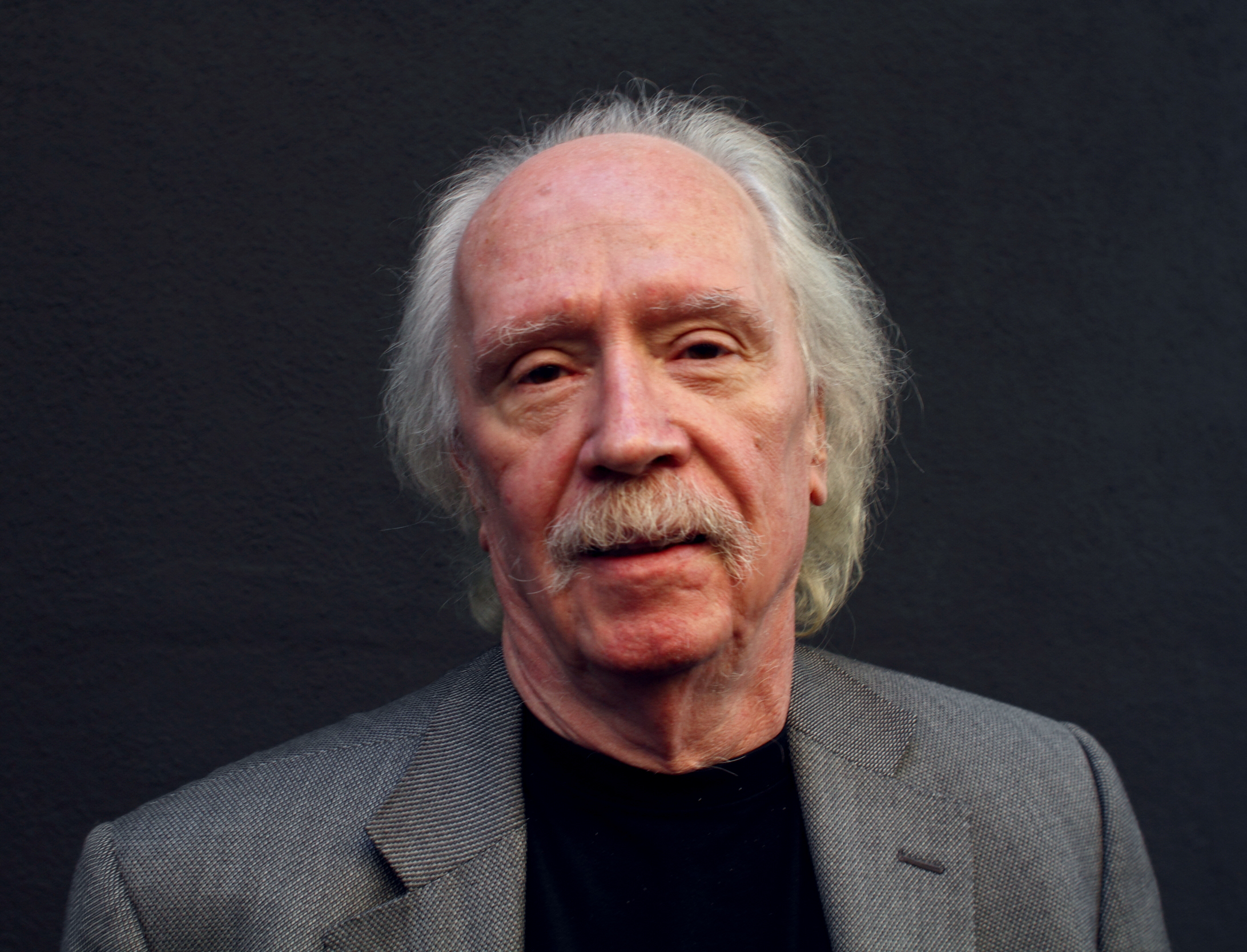
John Carpenter

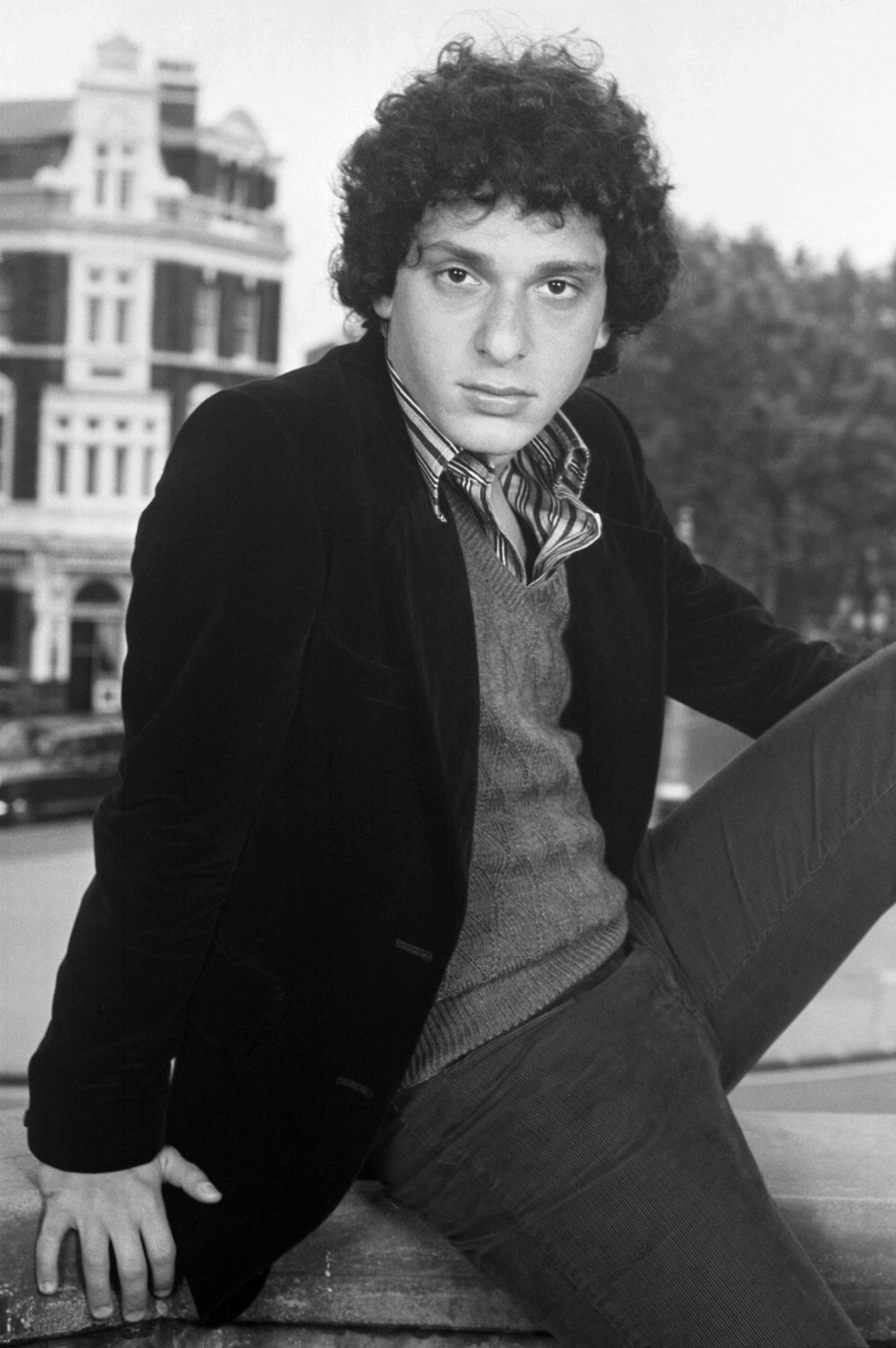
Paul Jabara

- January 1 – Joe Petagno, American illustrator
- January 2
  - Joyce Wadler, American journalist and author
  - Judith Miller, American journalist and author
- January 5 – Ted Lange, African-American actor, director (The Love Boat)
- January 7 – Kenny Loggins, American rock singer
- January 10
  - Donald Fagen, American rock keyboardist (Steely Dan)
  - Teresa Graves, African-American actress and comedian (Get Christie Love) (d. 2002)
- January 11 – Larry Harvey, American co-founder of Burning Man (d. 2018)
- January 12 – Khalid Muhammad, black supremacist (d. 2001)
- January 14
  - T Bone Burnett, American record producer, musician
  - John Lescroart, American author and screenwriter
  - Carl Weathers, African-American actor, football player (Rocky IV, Action Jackson) (d. 2024)
- January 15 – Ronnie Van Zant, American rock musician (Lynyrd Skynyrd) (d. 1977)
- January 16 – John Carpenter, American film director, producer, screenwriter and composer
- January 18 – M. C. Gainey, American actor
- January 20 – Jerry L. Ross, United States Air Force officer, engineer and NASA astronaut
- January 22 – Gilbert Levine, American conductor
- January 23
  - Katharine Holabird, American writer
  - Anita Pointer, American singer-songwriter (The Pointer Sisters) (d. 2022)
- January 24 – Elliott Abrams, American attorney and conservative policy analyst
- January 28 – Charles Strum, American journalist and author (d. 2021)
- January 31 – Paul Jabara, American actor, singer and songwriter (d. 1992)

=== February ===
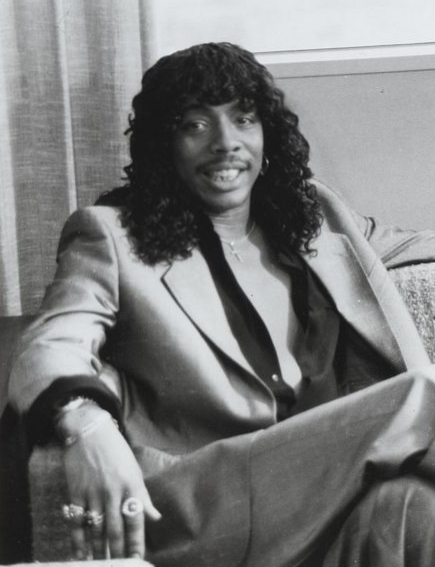
Rick James

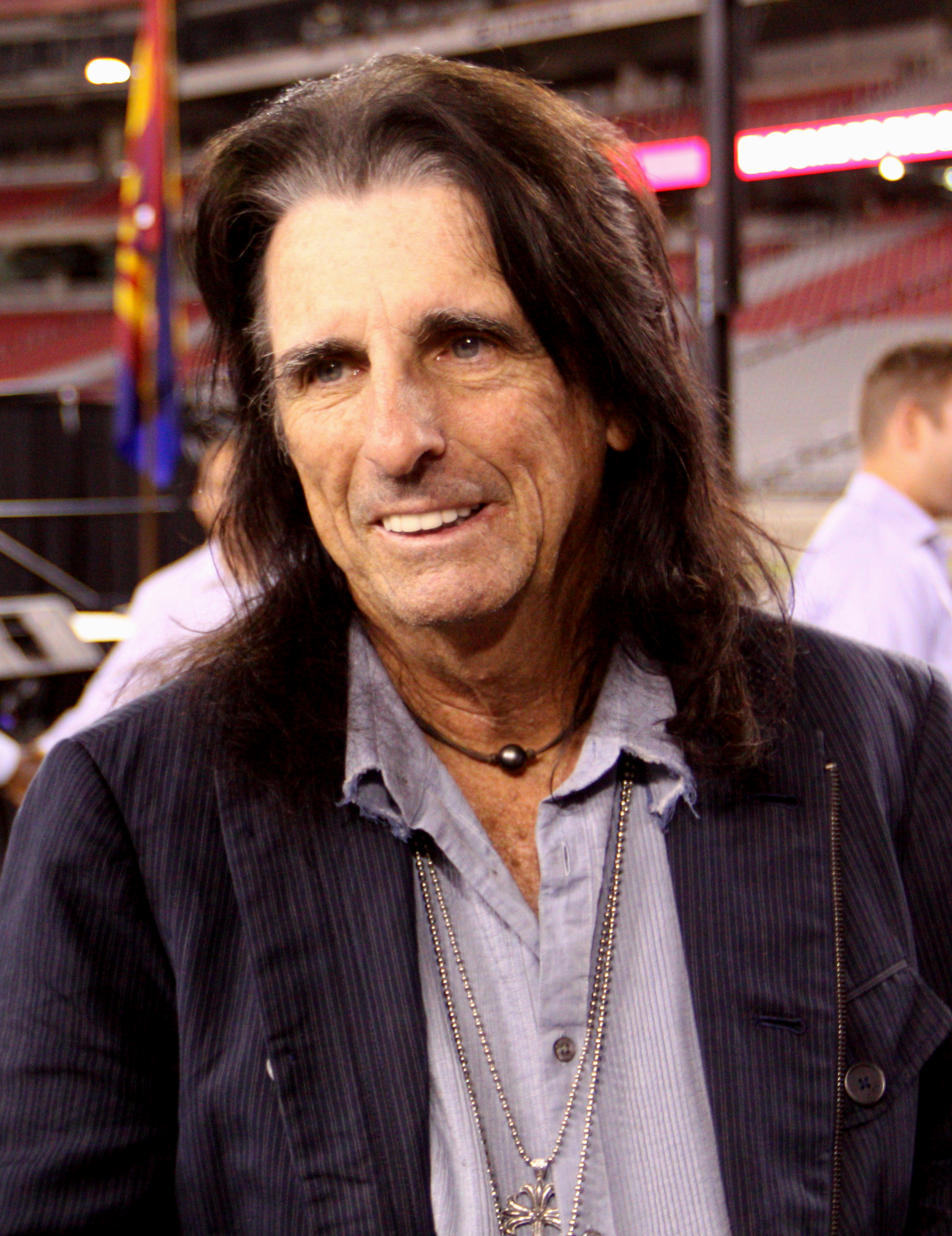
Alice Cooper

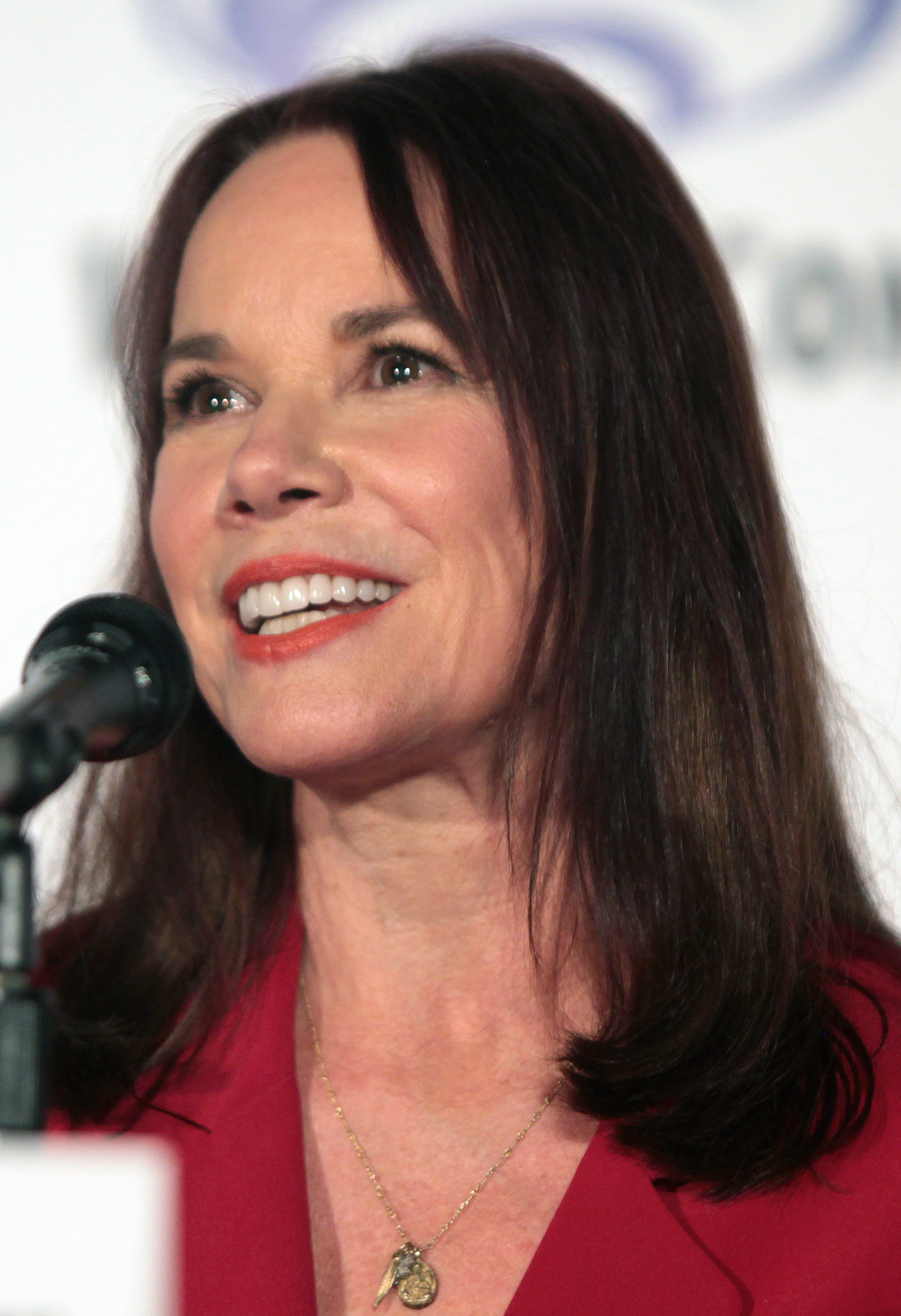
Barbara Hershey

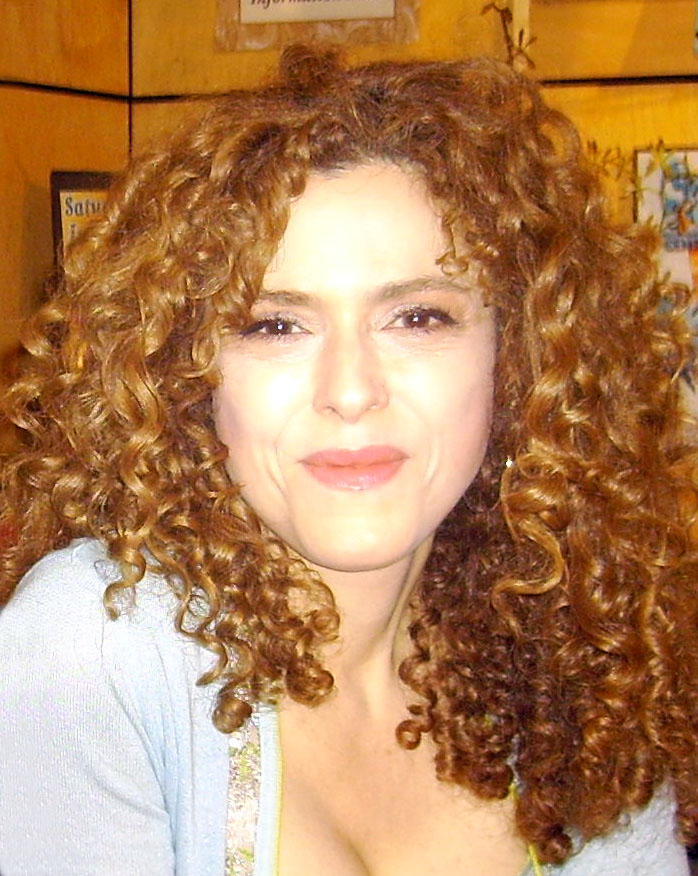
Bernadette Peters

- February 1 – Rick James, African-American urban singer, songwriter, multi-instrumentalist, and record producer (d. 2004)
- February 2 – Ina Garten, American cooking author
- February 4
  - Alice Cooper, American hard rock singer and musician
  - Rod Grams, American politician (d. 2013)
- February 5
  - Christopher Guest, American actor, screenwriter, director and composer
  - Herbie Herbert, American music manager (d. 2021)
  - Barbara Hershey, American actress (Beaches)
- February 7 – Jimmy Greenspoon, American singer-songwriter and keyboard player (Three Dog Night) (d. 2015)
- February 8 – Dan Seals, American musician (d. 2009)
- February 9 – Greg Stafford, American game designer, publisher (d. 2018)
- February 10 – John Gamble, American baseball player (d. 2022)
- February 12 – Raymond Kurzweil, American inventor, author
- February 13 – Kitten Natividad, Mexican-American film actress (d. 2022)
- February 14
  - Jackie Martling, American comedian, radio personality
  - Raymond Teller, American illusionist and magician, one half of the duo Penn & Teller
- February 15
  - Ron Cey, American baseball player and sportscaster
  - Larry DiTillio, American film and TV series writer (d. 2019)
  - Tino Insana, American actor, producer, writer, voice artist, and comedian (d. 2017)
- February 17 – Rick Majerus, basketball player and coach (d. 2012)
- February 19 – Raúl Grijalva, American politician (d. 2025)
- February 20 – Jennifer O'Neill, American model, actress
- February 22
  - John Ashton, American actor
  - Leslie H. Sabo Jr., American Medal of Honor recipient (d. 1970)
- February 28
  - Steven Chu, American physicist, Nobel Prize laureate
  - Mike Figgis, American director, screenwriter and composer
  - Bernadette Peters, American actress, singer
  - Mercedes Ruehl, American actress
- February 29
  - Ken Foree, American actor
  - Henry Small, American-born Canadian singer

=== March ===
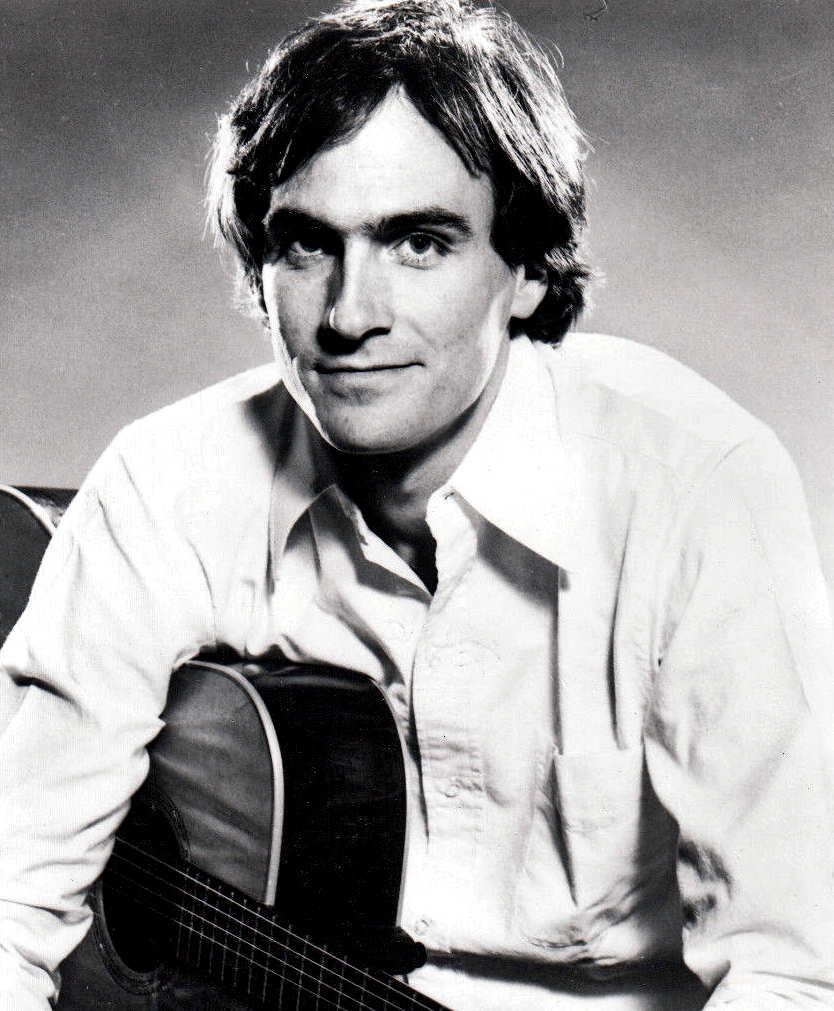
James Taylor

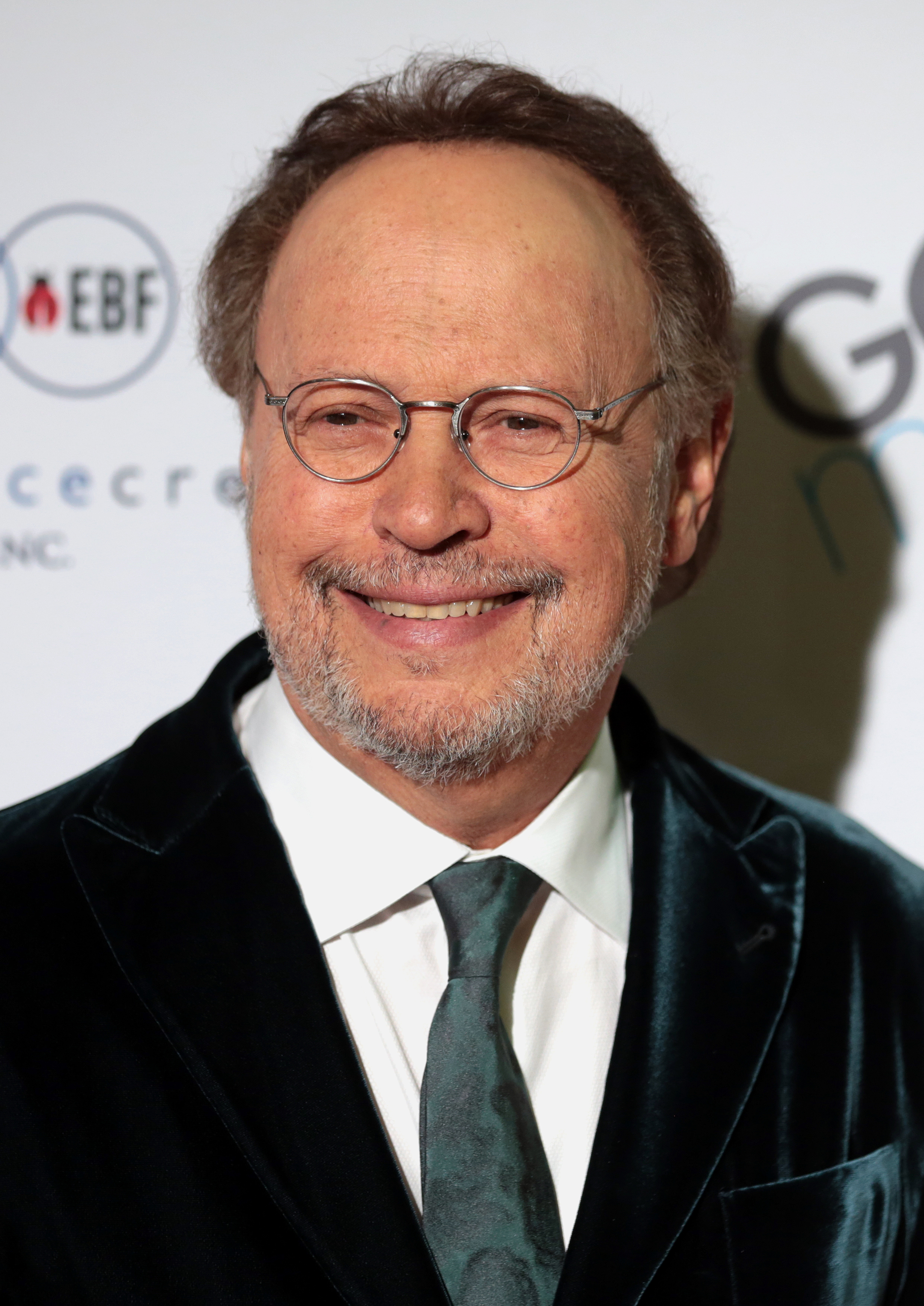
Billy Crystal

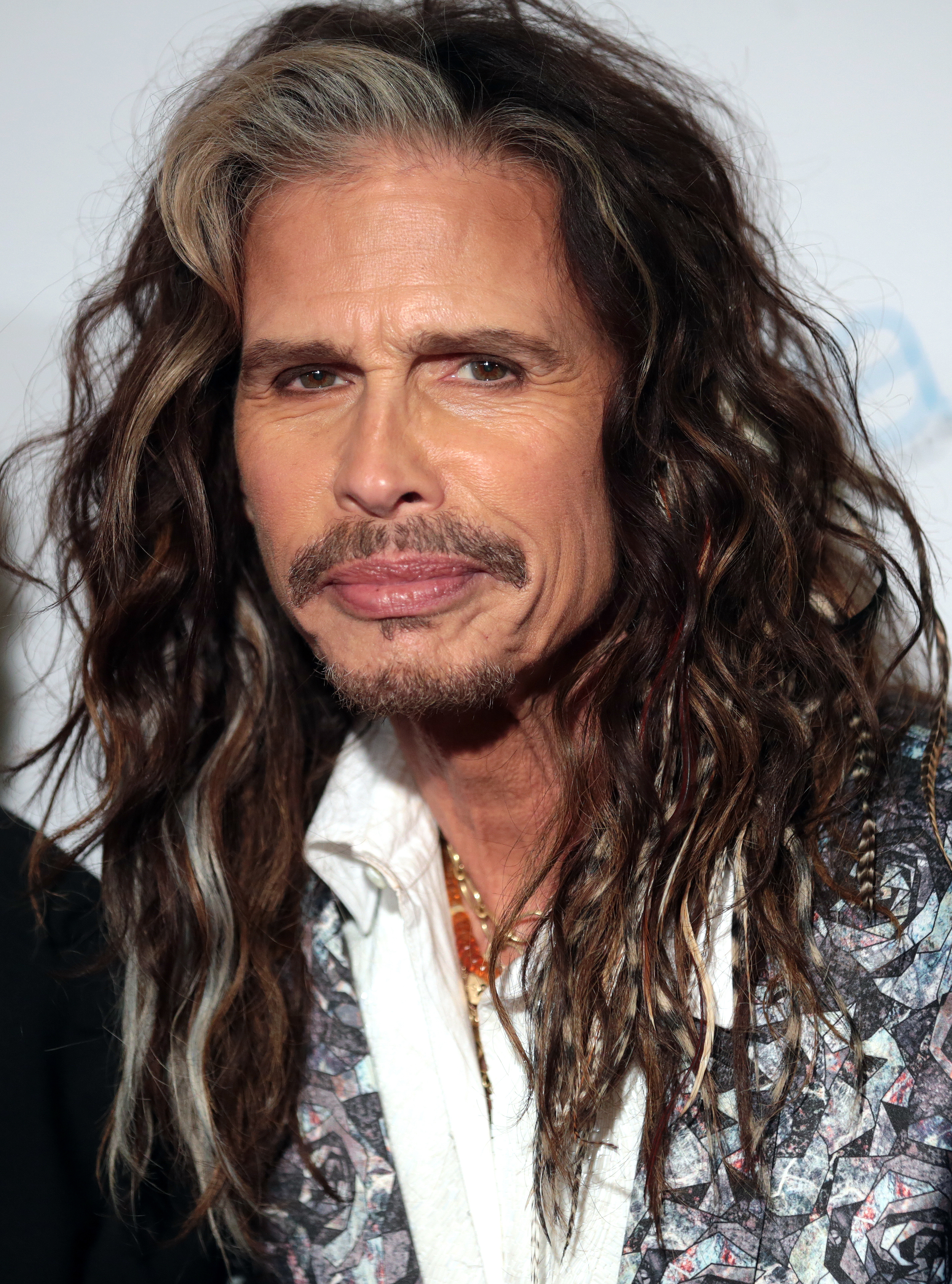
Steven Tyler

Al Gore

- March 2 – R. T. Crowley, American pioneer of electronic commerce
- March 3 – Steve Wilhite, American computer scientist (d. 2022)
- March 4
  - James Ellroy, American writer
  - Tom Grieve, American baseball player
  - Leron Lee, American baseball player
  - Brian Cummings, American voice actor
- March 5 – Leslie Marmon Silko, American author of Laguna Pueblo descent
- March 6 – Anna Maria Horsford, African-American actress
- March 9 – Jeffrey Osborne, African-American singer ("On the Wings of Love")
- March 12
  - Kent Conrad, American politician
  - James Taylor, American singer, songwriter ("Fire and Rain")
- March 14
  - Tom Coburn, American politician
  - Billy Crystal, American actor, comedian
- March 17 – William Gibson, American/Canadian writer
- March 20 – John de Lancie, American actor
- March 22 – Wolf Blitzer, American television journalist (CNN)
- March 25
  - Michael F. Adams, American political staffer and academic administrator (d. 2026)
  - Bonnie Bedelia, American actress
- March 26 – Steven Tyler, American rock singer, songwriter (Aerosmith)
- March 28
  - Jayne Ann Krentz, American novelist
  - Dianne Wiest, American actress
- March 29
  - Mike Heideman, American basketball coach (d. 2018)
  - Bud Cort, American actor (Harold and Maude) (d. 2026)
- March 31
  - Al Gore, American politician, 45th vice president of the United States from 1993 to 2001
  - Rhea Perlman, American actress (Cheers)

=== April ===
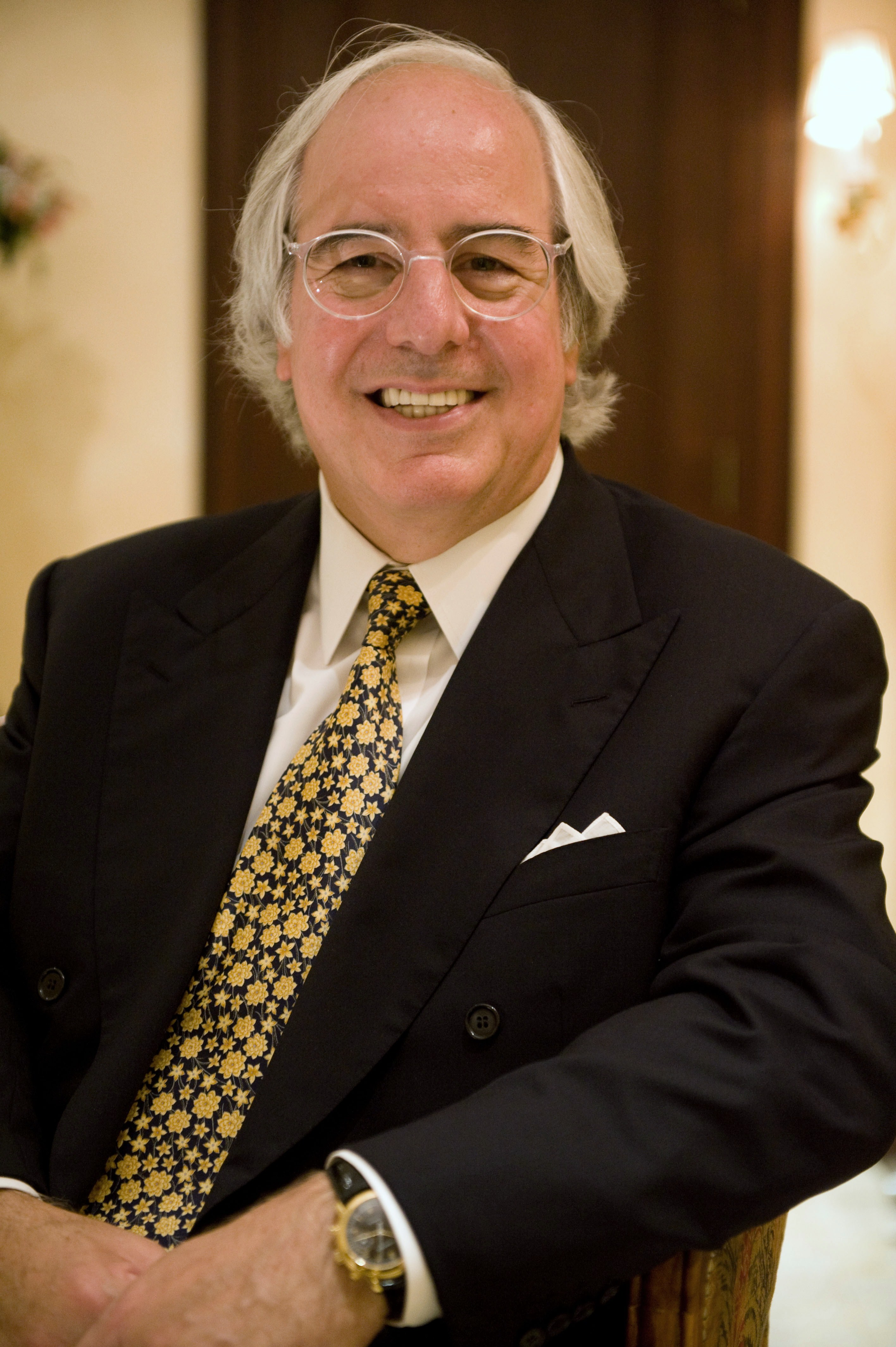
Frank Abagnale

- April 2 – Bob Lienhard, American basketball player (d. 2018)
- April 4
  - Berry Oakley, American musician (d. 1972)
  - Richard Parsons, American businessman (d. 2024)
  - Squire Parsons, American gospel singer, songwriter
  - Dan Simmons, American fantasy, science fiction author
- April 5 – Neil Portnow, American president of The Recording Academy (NARAS)
- April 7 – John Oates, American rock singer, guitarist (Hall & Oates)
- April 12 – Don Fernando, American pornographic film actor, director
- April 15 – Michael Kamen, American composer (d. 2003)
- April 20 – Paul Milgrom, American economist, Nobel Prize laureate
- April 21 – Paul Davis, American singer, songwriter (Cool Night) (d. 2008)
- April 27
  - Frank Abagnale, American con man, imposter
  - Si Robertson, American reality star, preacher, hunter, outdoorsman, and U.S. Army veteran
- April 28 – Marcia Strassman, American actress, singer (Welcome Back, Kotter) (d. 2014)

=== May ===
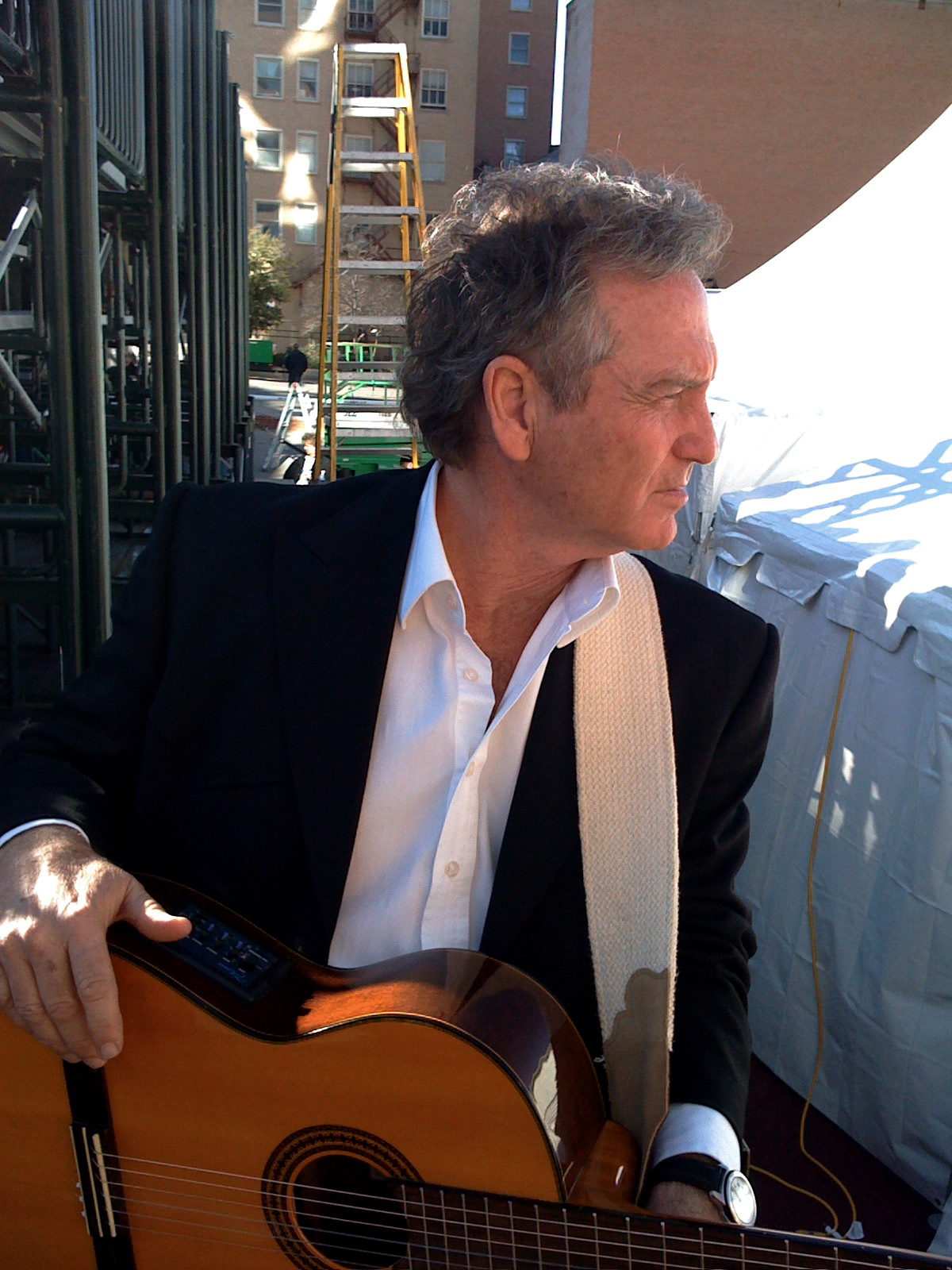
Larry Gatlin

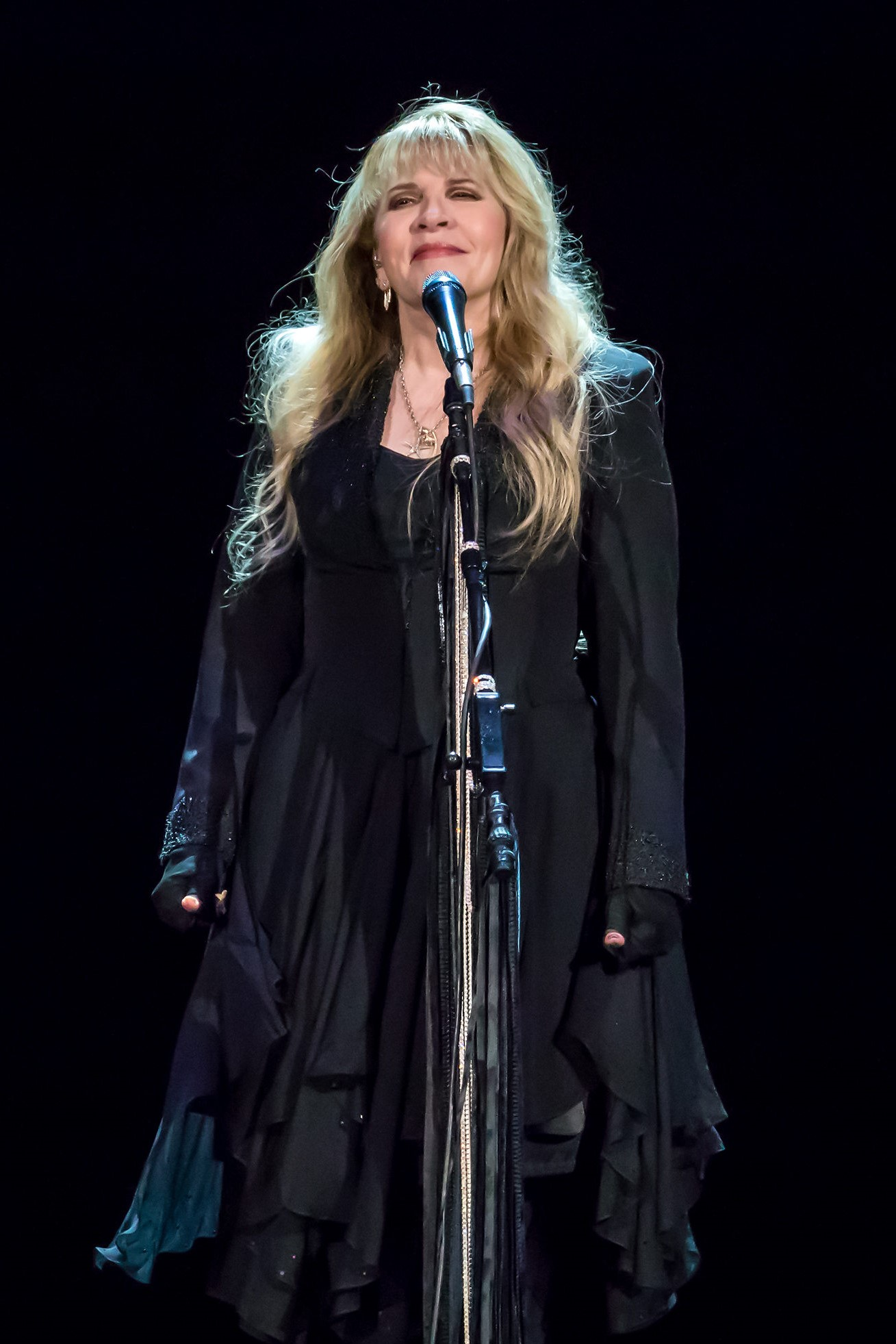
Stevie Nicks

- May 2 – Larry Gatlin, American singer, songwriter
- May 3
  - William H. Miller, American maritime historian
  - Chris Mulkey, American actor
- May 4 – Tanya Falan Welk-Roberts, American singer
- May 5
  - Joe Esposito, American singer, songwriter
  - Richard Pacheco, American pornographic actor
- May 7 – Susan Atkins, American convicted murderer (d. 2009)
- May 8 – Steve Braun, American baseball player and coach
- May 9
  - Steven W. Mosher, American social scientist, author
  - Calvin Murphy, American basketball player, analyst
- May 12 – Lindsay Crouse, American actress
- May 17
  - Penny DeHaven, American country singer (d. 2014)
  - Jim Gardner, American journalist
- May 18
  - Diane Crump, American jockey and horse trainer (d. 2025)
  - Olivia Harrison, American author and film producer
  - Tom Udall, American politician
- May 21 – D'Jamin Bartlett, American musical theatre actress
- May 26 – Stevie Nicks, American singer-songwriter (Fleetwood Mac)
- May 31 – Gloria Molina, American politician (d. 2023)

=== June ===
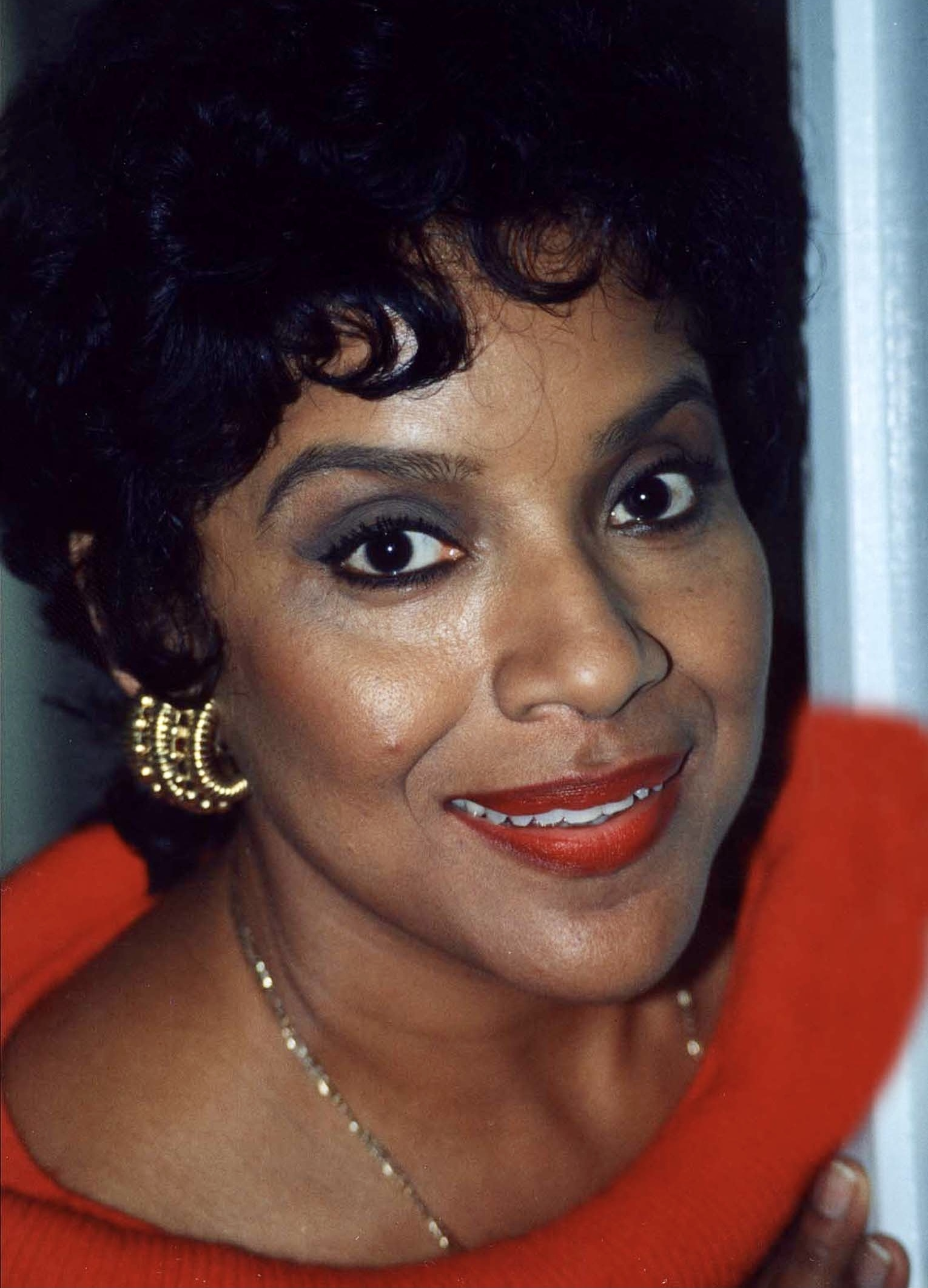
Phylicia Rashad

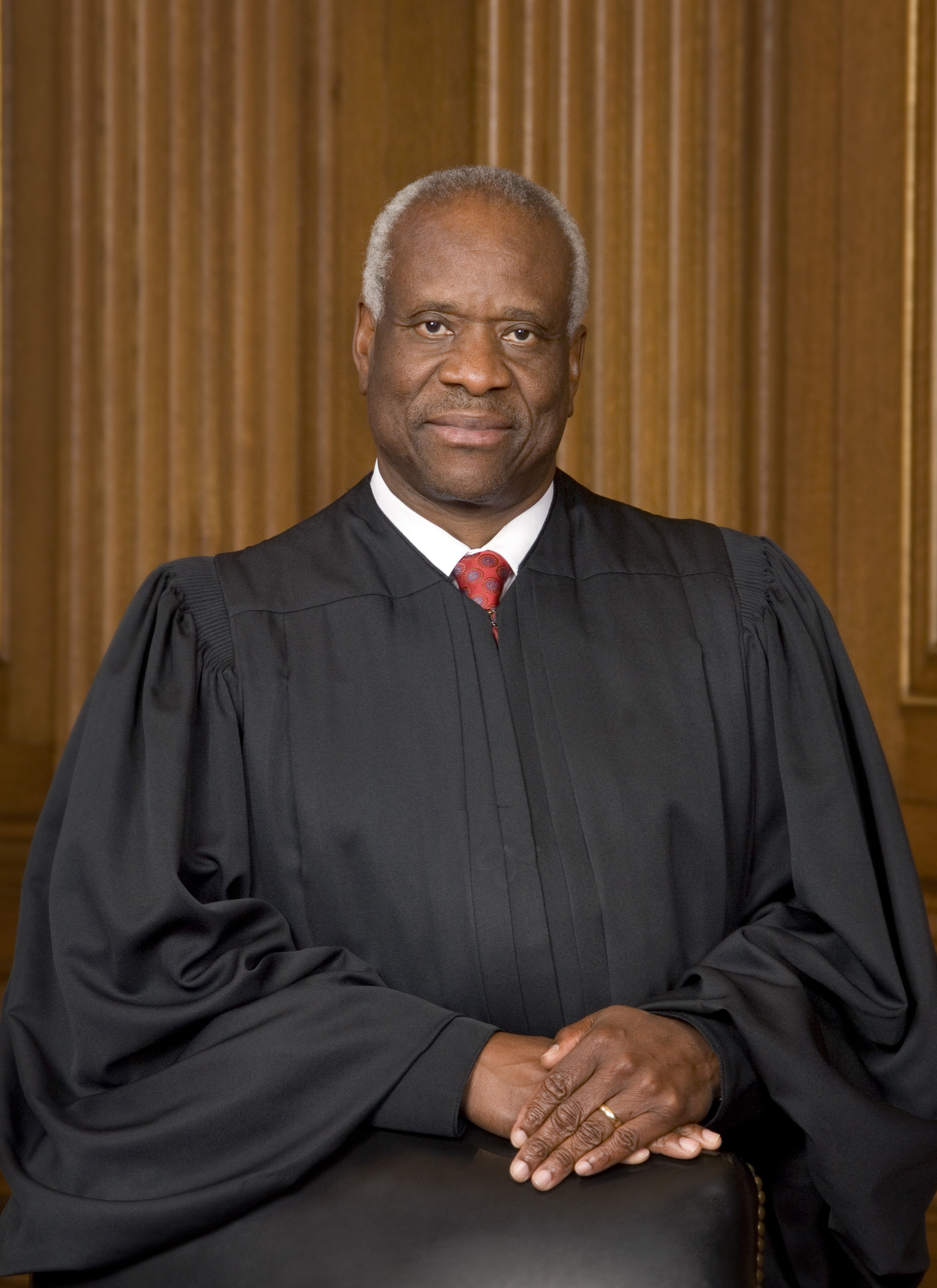
Clarence Thomas

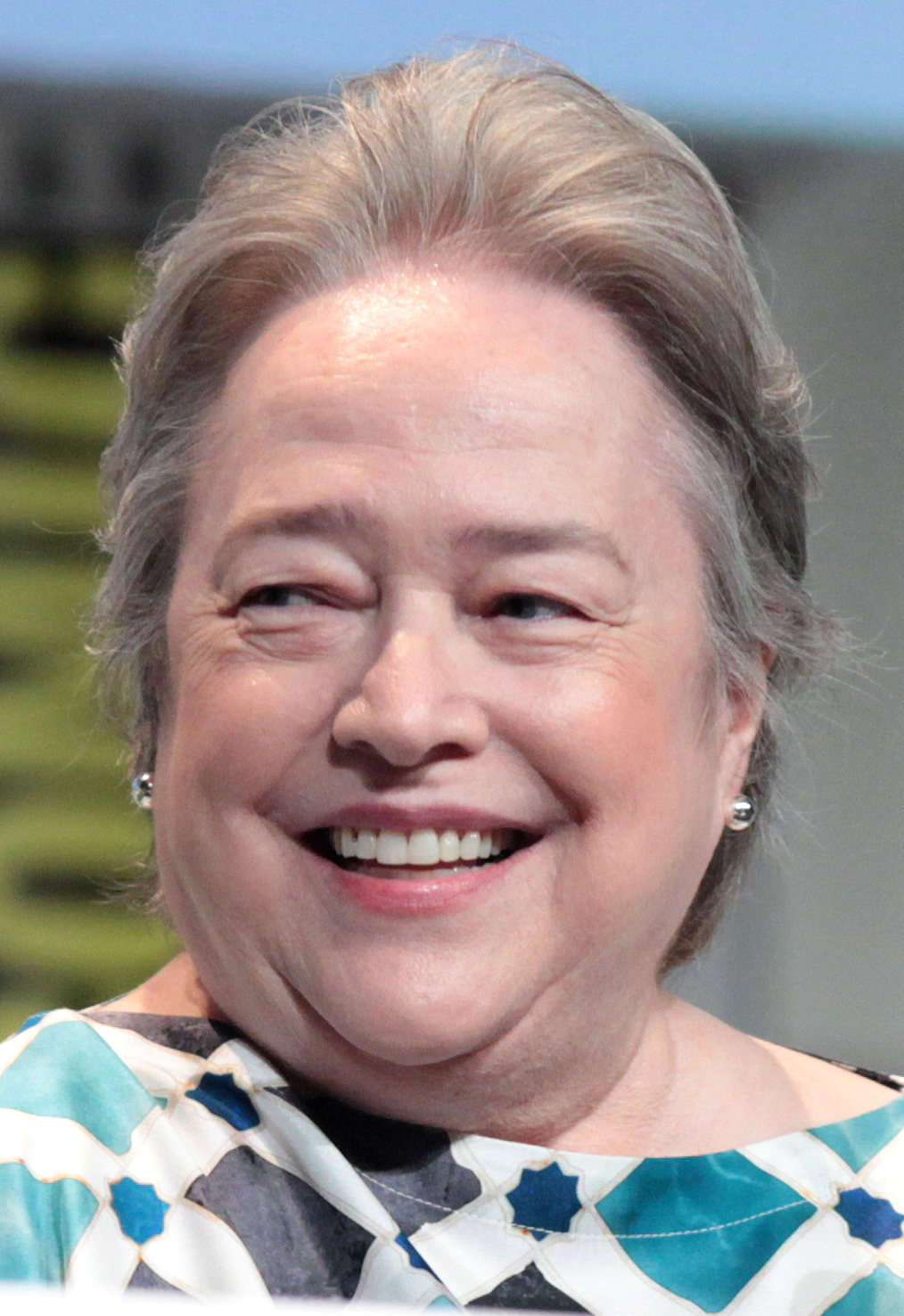
Kathy Bates

- June 1
  - Powers Boothe, American actor (d. 2017)
  - Chris Madden, American interior designer (d. 2022)
  - Tom Sneva, American race car driver and sportscaster
- June 2
  - Jerry Mathers, American actor
  - Jack Pierce, American baseball player and coach (d. 2012)
- June 4 – David Haskell, American actor (d. 2000)
- June 9 – Martha Lillard, polio survivor (d. 2026)
- June 9 – Gary Thorne, American play-by-play announcer
- June 11 – Dave Cash, American baseball player
- June 14 – Laurence Yep, American author
- June 19 – Phylicia Rashad, African-American actress (The Cosby Show)
- June 21 – Greg Hyder, American professional basketball player
- June 22
  - Sue Roberts, American professional golfer
  - Todd Rundgren, American rock singer, record producer (Hello It's Me)
  - Curtis Johnson, American football cornerback
- June 23
  - Larry Coker, American football player, coach
  - Jim Heacock, American defensive coordinator
  - Luther Kent, American blues singer
  - Clarence Thomas, African-American Associate Justice of the Supreme Court of the United States
- June 25
  - Kenn George, American businessman
  - Michael Lembeck, American actor, television and film director
- June 27 – Camile Baudoin, American rock guitarist
- June 28 – Kathy Bates, American actress
- June 29 – Fred Grandy, American actor, politician
- June 30 – Raymond Leo Burke, American cardinal, prelate

=== July ===
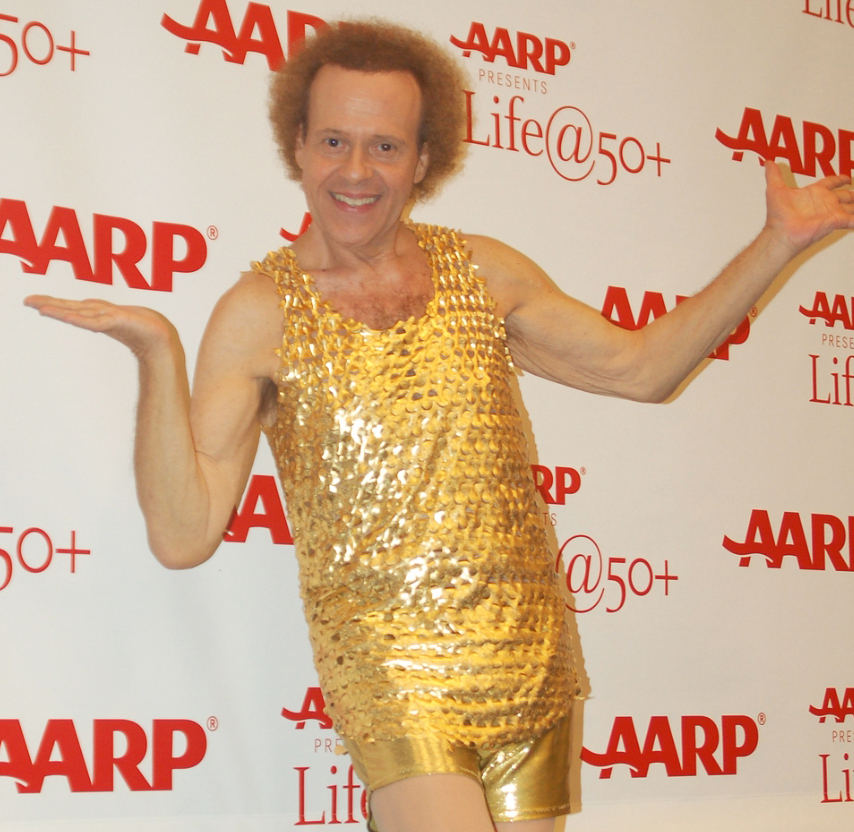
Richard Simmons

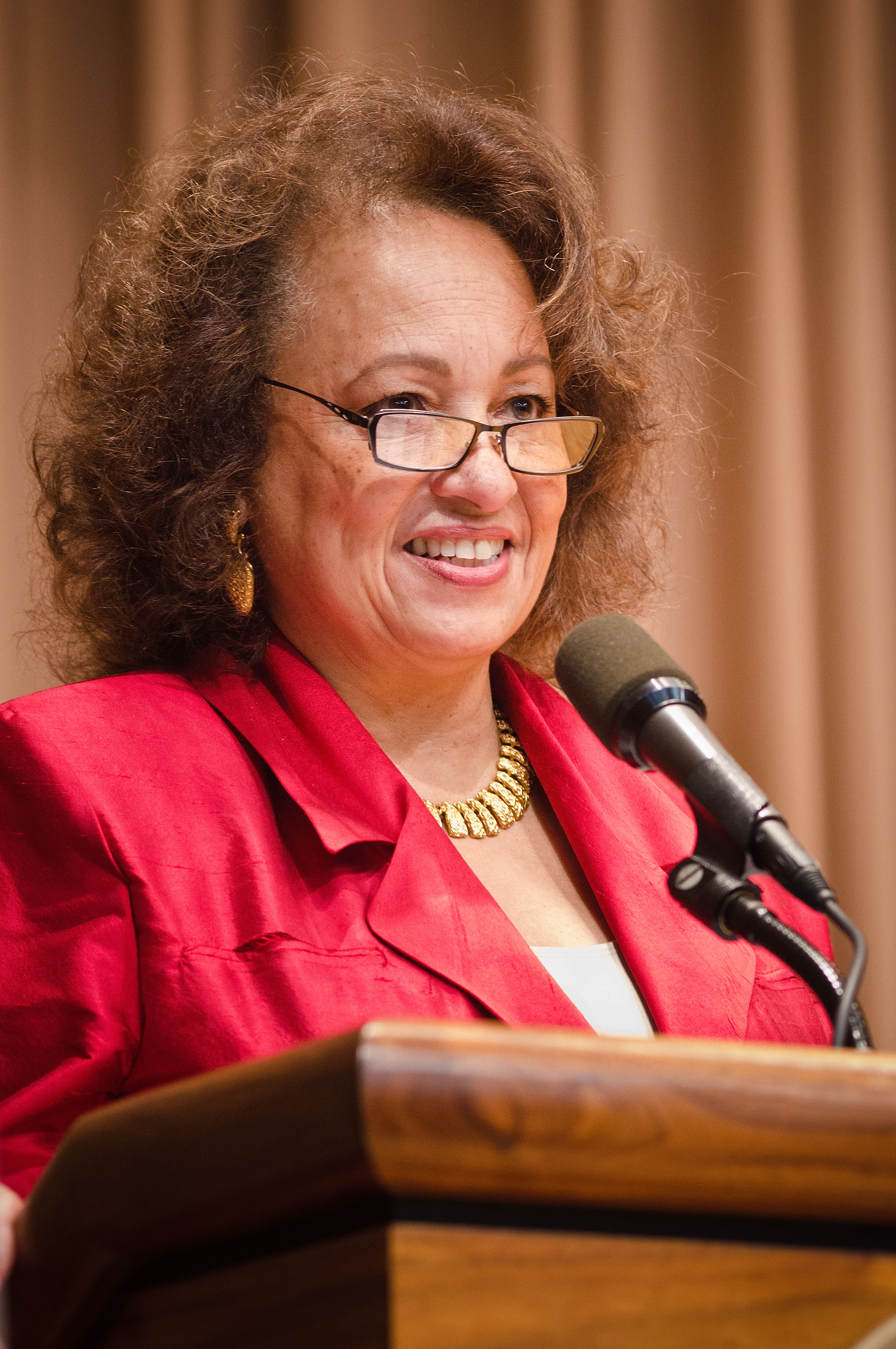
Daphne Maxwell Reid

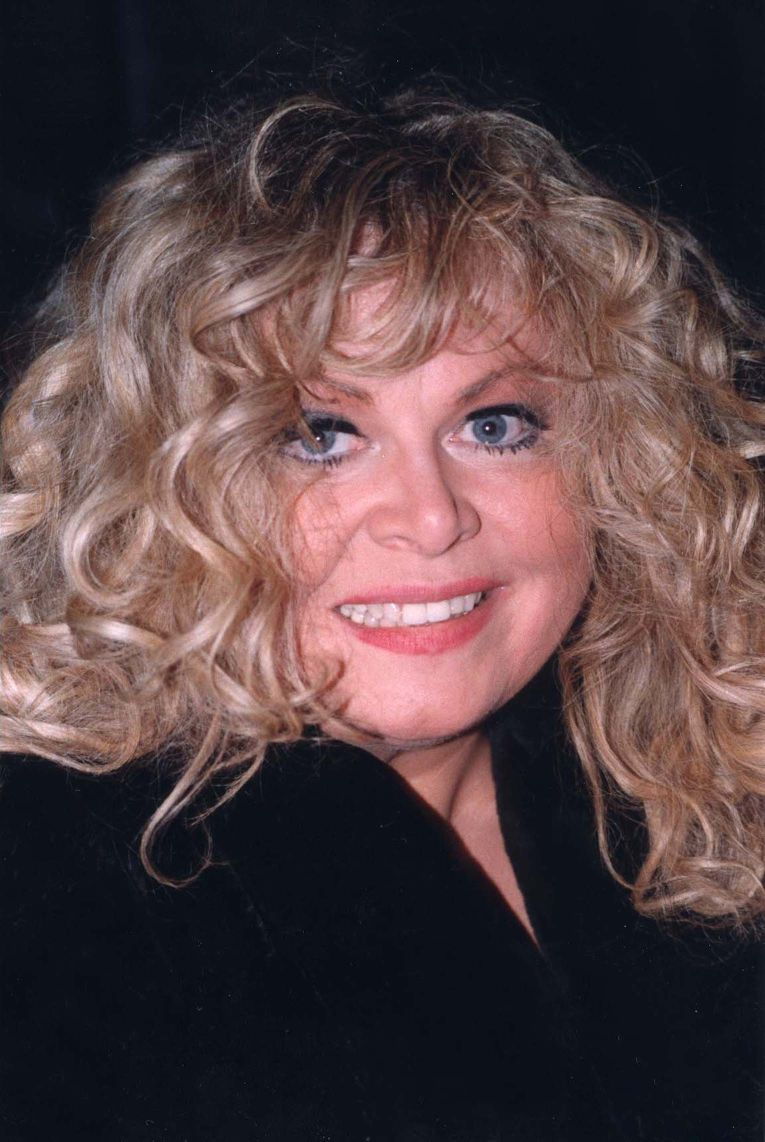
Sally Struthers

- July 2 – Ruth Rogers, American-born British chef
- July 5
  - Tony DeMeo, American football coach, player
  - Dave Lemonds, American baseball player
- July 6
  - Jeff Webb, American professional basketball player
  - Sid Smith, American football offensive lineman
- July 7 – Jerry Sherk, American football defensive tackle
- July 10 – Rich Hand, American professional baseball player
- July 12
  - Ben Burtt, American movie sound designer
  - Richard Simmons, American television personality, fitness expert
  - Jay Thomas, American actor (d. 2017)
- July 13 – Daphne Maxwell Reid, African-American actress
- July 14 – Tom Latham, American politician
- July 16 – Jeff Van Wagenen, American professional golfer
- July 17 – Doug Berry, American-Canadian football coach
- July 20 – Muse Watson, American actor
- July 21
  - Ed Hinton, American sportswriter
  - Garry Trudeau, American cartoonist (Doonesbury)
- July 22 – Susan Eloise Hinton, American author
- July 25
  - Tony Cline, American football player (d. 2018)
  - Steve Goodman, American Grammy Award-winning folk music singer, songwriter (d. 1984)
- July 27 – Peggy Fleming, American figure skater
- July 28
  - Gerald Casale, American director, singer (Devo)
  - Georgia Engel, American actress (d. 2019)
  - Sally Struthers, American actress, spokeswoman (All in the Family)
- July 29 – Sal Maida, American bass guitarist (d. 2025)

=== August ===
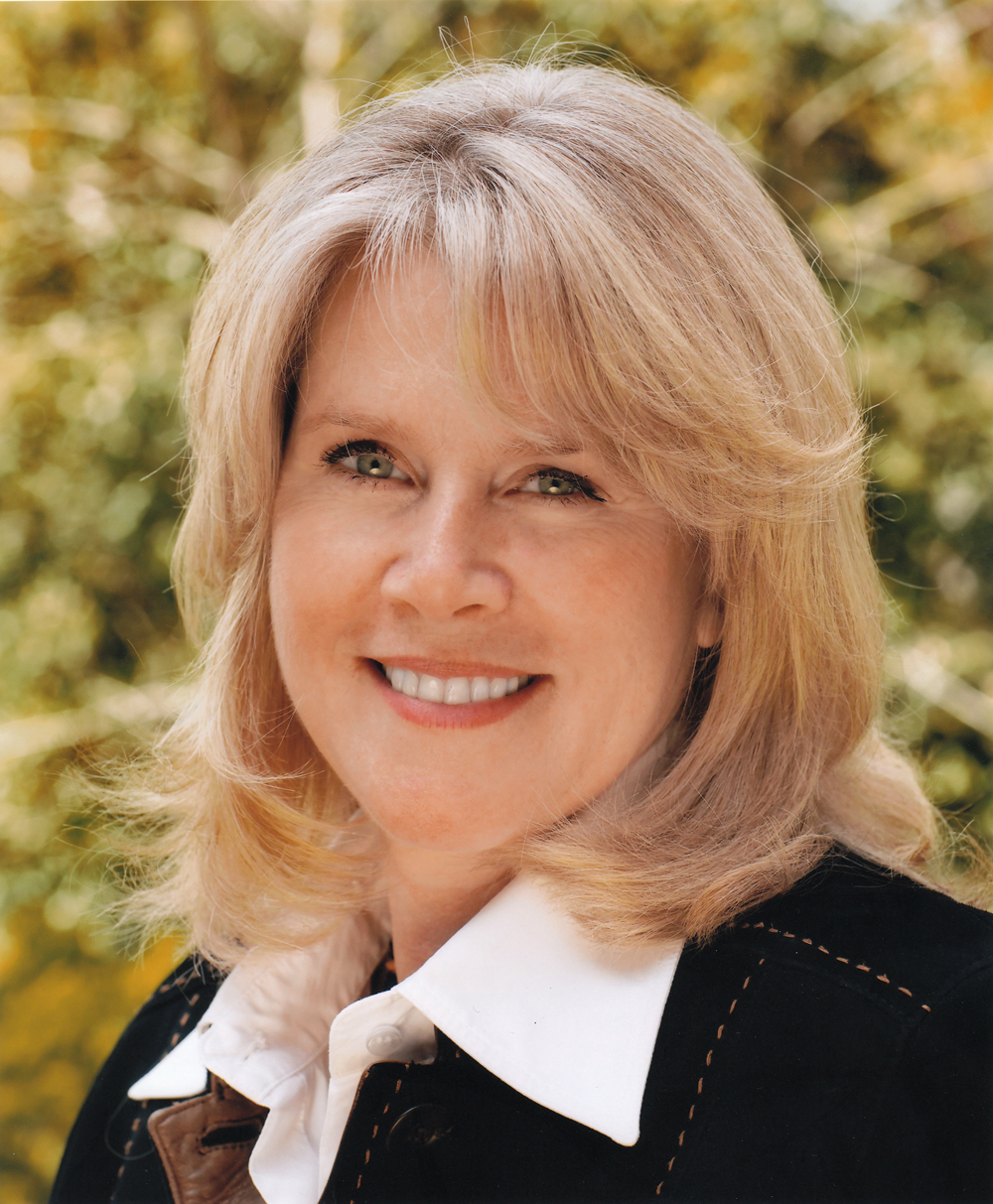
Tipper Gore

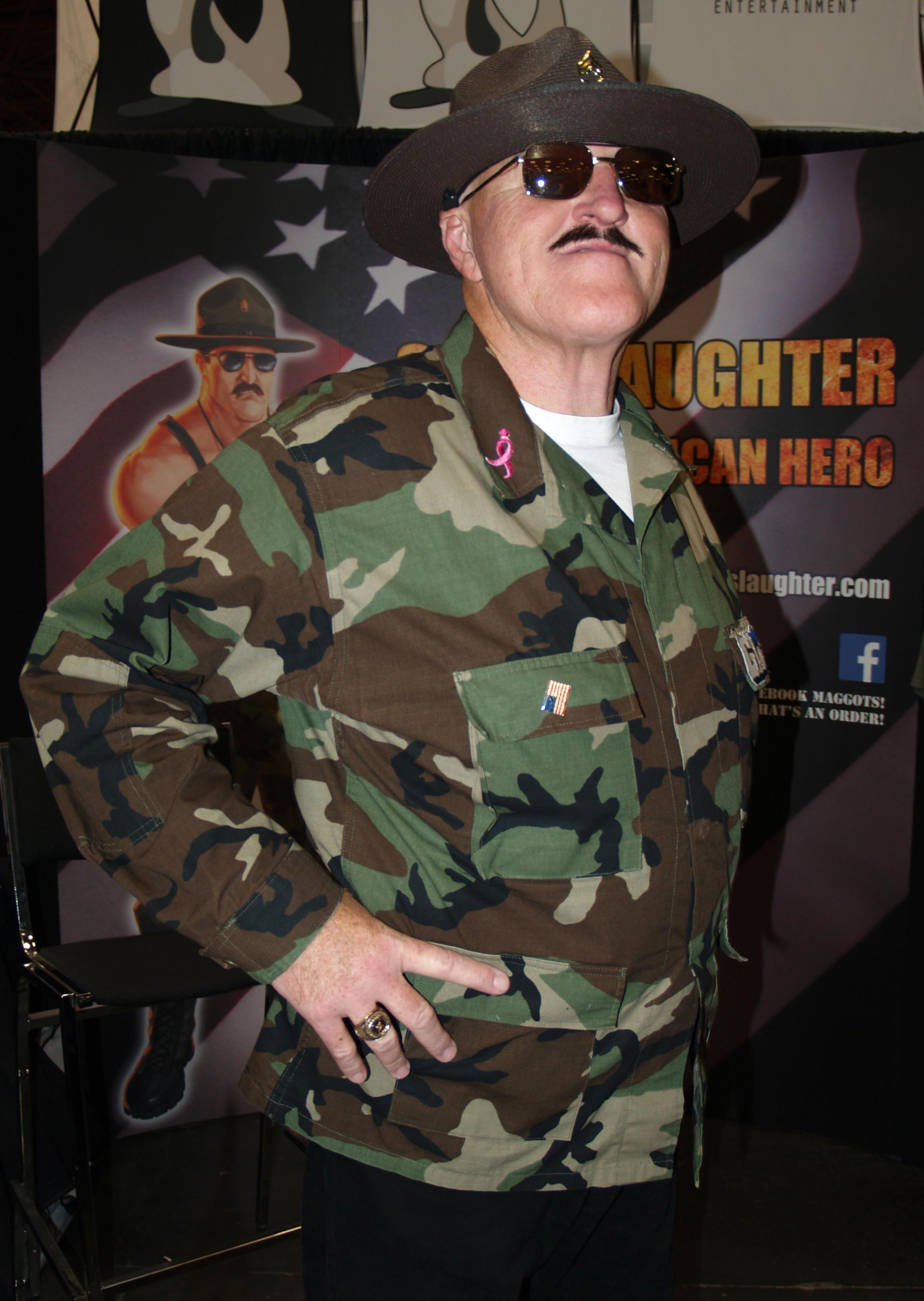
Sgt. Slaughter

- August 2 – Dennis Prager, American radio talk show host, author
- August 7 – James P. Allison, American immunologist, recipient of the Nobel Prize in Physiology or Medicine in 2018
- August 13 – Kathleen Battle, African-American soprano
- August 17 – Edward Lazear, American economist (d. 2020)
- August 19
  - Tipper Gore, Second Lady of the United States as wife of Al Gore
  - Elliot Lurie, singer-songwriter and guitarist
  - Gerald McRaney, actor, director, and producer
  - Deana Martin, American singer and actress
- August 20 – Barbara Allen Rainey (b. Barbara Ann Allen), American aviator, first female pilot in the U.S. armed forces (d. 1982)
- August 21 – John Ellis, American baseball player (d. 2022)
- August 22 – Bishop Bullwinkle, American pastor (d. 2019)
- August 23 – Victoria MacKenzie-Childs, American ceramic artist and retailer (d. 2026)
- August 27 – Sgt. Slaughter, American professional wrestler
- August 29 – Robert S. Langer, American chemical engineer
- August 30
  - Lewis Black, American comedian
  - Fred Hampton, African-American activist (d. 1969)
- August 31 – Cyril Jordan, American musician

=== September ===
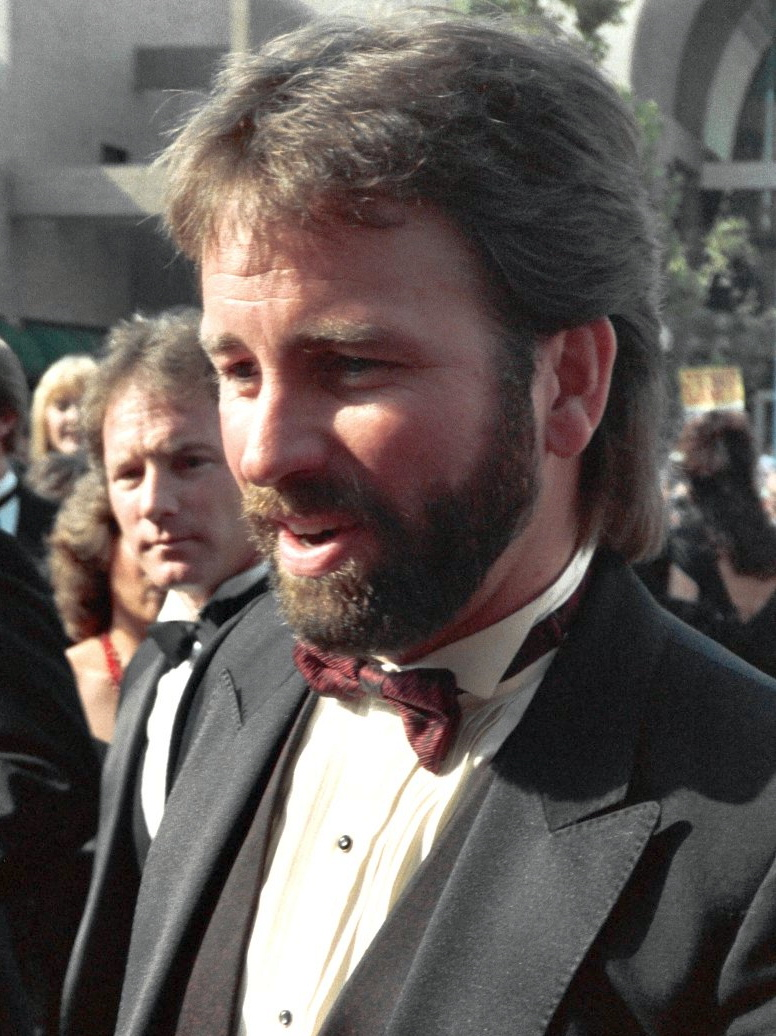
John Ritter

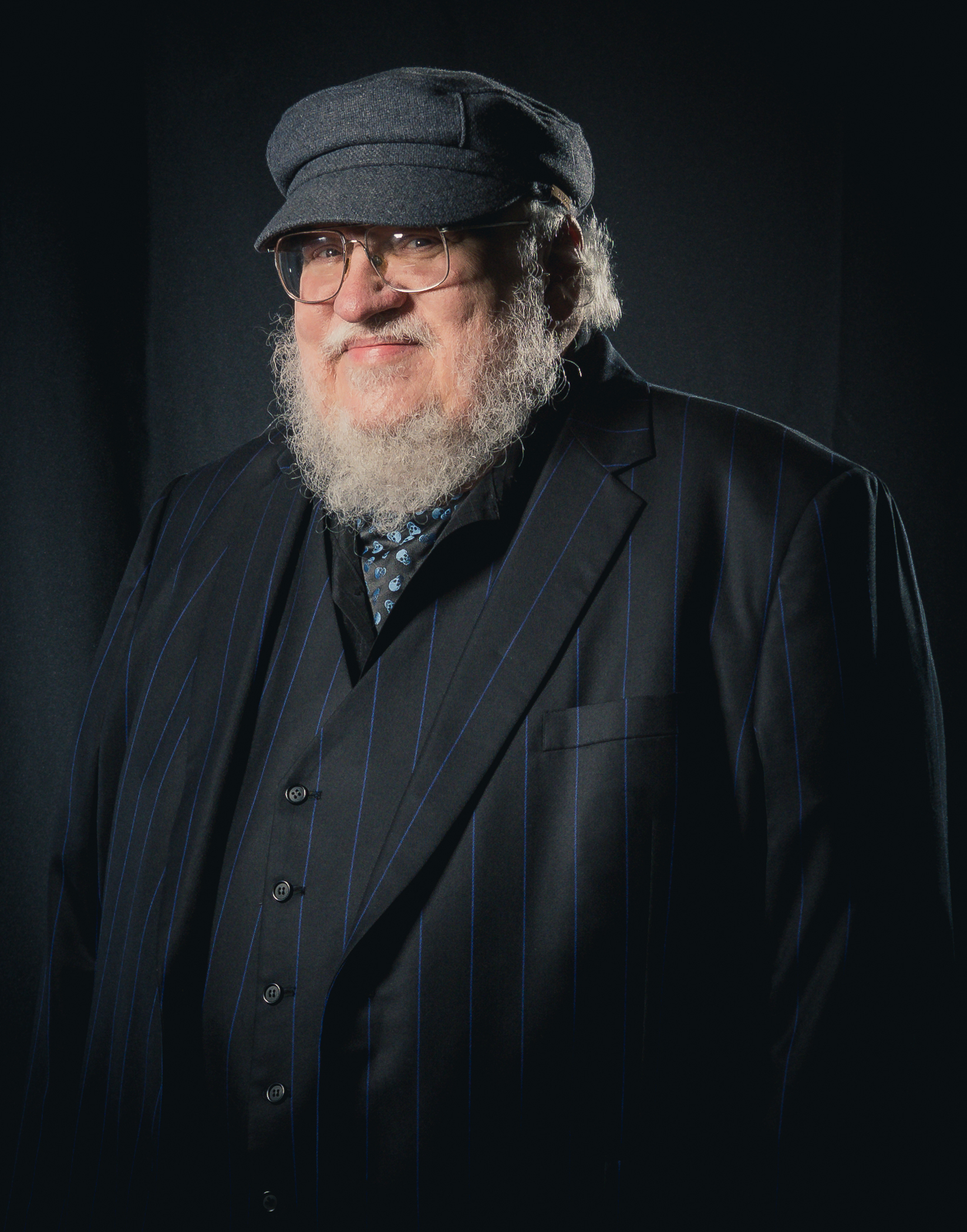
George R. R. Martin

- September 1 – James Rebhorn, American actor (d. 2014)
- September 2
  - Nate Archibald, American basketball player
  - Terry Bradshaw, American football player, sportscaster
  - Christa McAuliffe, American teacher, astronaut (Challenger Disaster) (d. 1986)
- September 3 – Don Brewer, American drummer (Grand Funk Railroad)
- September 4 – Michael Berryman, American actor
- September 7 – Susan Blakely, American actress
- September 10
  - Bob Lanier, American basketball player (d. 2022)
  - Mike McCoy, American businessman (d. 2021)
  - Ted Poe, American politician
  - Charlie Waters, American football player
- September 13 – Nell Carter, African-American singer, actress (Gimme a Break!) (d. 2003)
- September 14 – Rich McGeorge, American football player (d. 2025)
- September 16 – Ron Blair, American bassist (Tom Petty and the Heartbreakers)
- September 17 – John Ritter, American actor and comedian (d. 2003)
- September 18
  - Lynn Abbey, American computer programmer and fantasy author
  - Ken Brett, baseball player, coach, and manager (d. 2003)
- September 20 – George R. R. Martin, American novelist and short-story writer
- September 22 – Jim Byrnes, American voice actor, blues musician and actor
- September 27 – A Martinez, American actor, singer
- September 29
  - Mark Farner, American rock guitarist, singer (Grand Funk Railroad)
  - Bryant Gumbel, African-American television broadcaster (The Today Show)

=== October ===
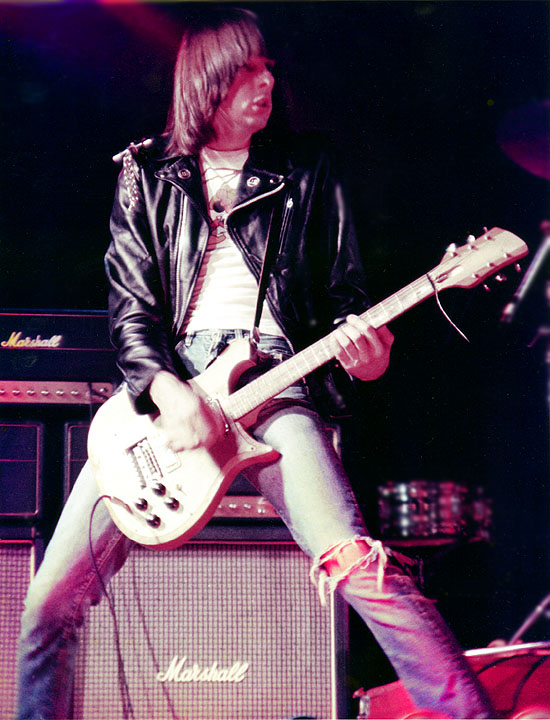
Johnny Ramone

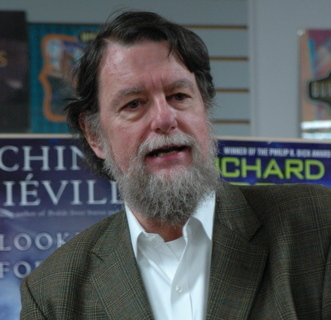
Robert Jordan

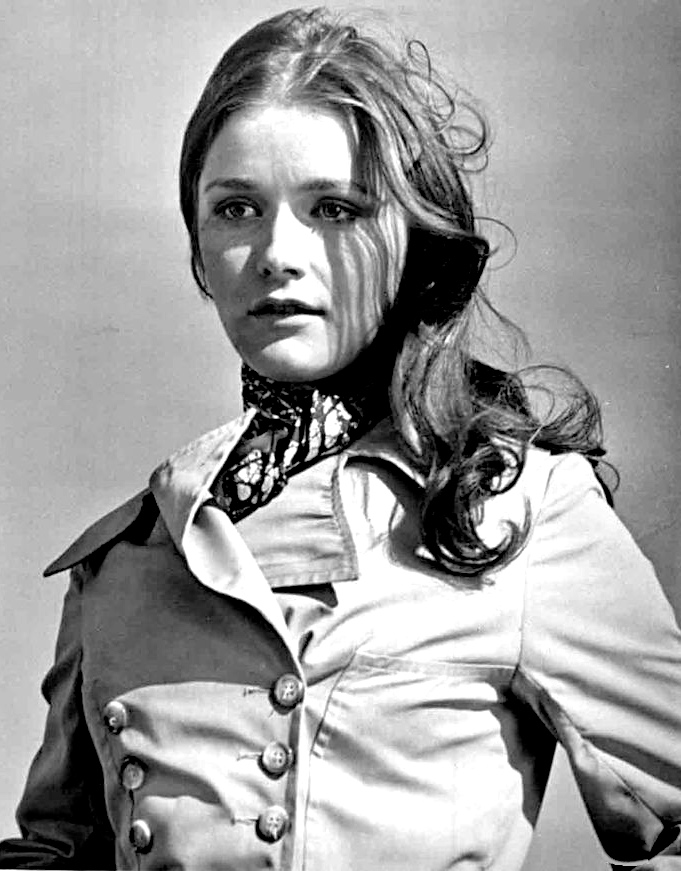
Margot Kidder

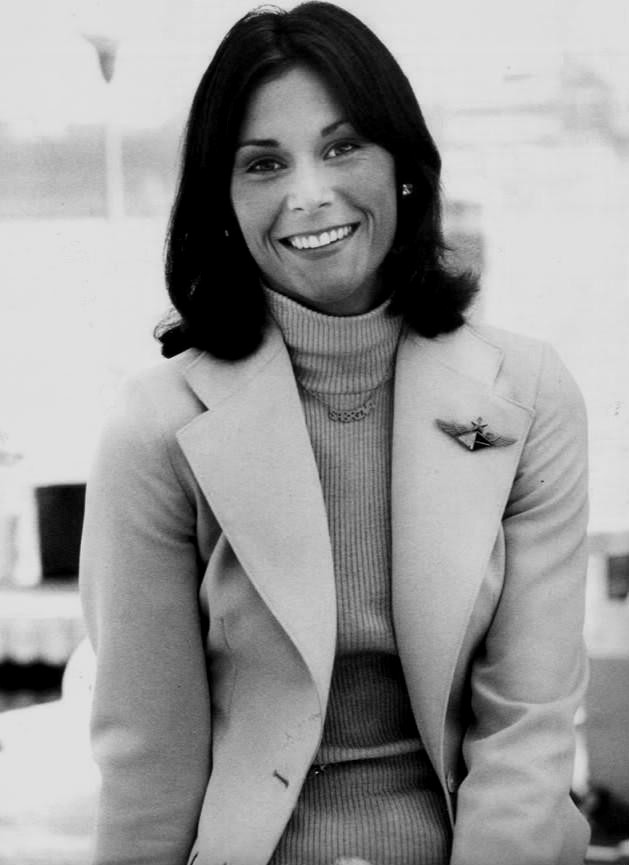
Kate Jackson

- October 1 – Mark Landon, actor (d. 2009)
- October 2
  - Avery Brooks, actor, musician
  - Chris LeDoux, singer, rodeo star (d. 2005)
  - Donna Karan, fashion designer
- October 4
  - Meg Bennett, soap opera writer
  - Linda McMahon, WWE executive and 25th Administrator of the Small Business Administration
- October 5
  - Carter Cornelius, singer (d. 1991)
  - Russell Mael, vocalist
  - Tawl Ross, guitarist
- October 7 – Diane Ackerman, poet and essayist
- October 8 – Johnny Ramone, guitarist (Ramones) (d. 2004)
- October 9 – Jackson Browne, rock musician ("Running on Empty")
- October 11
  - Margie Alexander, gospel, soul singer (d. 2013)
  - Cynthia Clawson, gospel singer
- October 13 – John Ford Coley, rock musician ("I'd Really Love to See You Tonight")
- October 14 – David Ruprecht, actor, writer (Supermarket Sweep)
- October 16
  - Leo Mazzone, baseball coach
  - André Leon Talley, fashion journalist (d. 2022)
- October 17
  - Robert Jordan, novelist (d. 2007)
  - Margot Kidder, Canadian-American actress, director and activist (d. 2018)
  - George Wendt, actor (Cheers) (d. 2025)
- October 18 – Ntozake Shange, African-American playwright, poet (d. 2018)
- October 19 – Patrick Simmons, rock musician (The Doobie Brothers)
- October 21
  - Tom Everett, actor
  - Allen Vigneron, Roman Catholic Archbishop of Detroit
- October 22
  - Lynette Fromme, would-be assassin of President Gerald Ford
  - Debbie Macomber, author
- October 25
  - Dave Cowens, basketball player and coach
  - Dan Gable, wrestler, coach
- October 26 – Toby Harrah, baseball player
- October 28 – Telma Hopkins, African-American actress, singer (Tony Orlando and Dawn)
- October 29 – Kate Jackson, actress (Charlie's Angels)

=== November ===
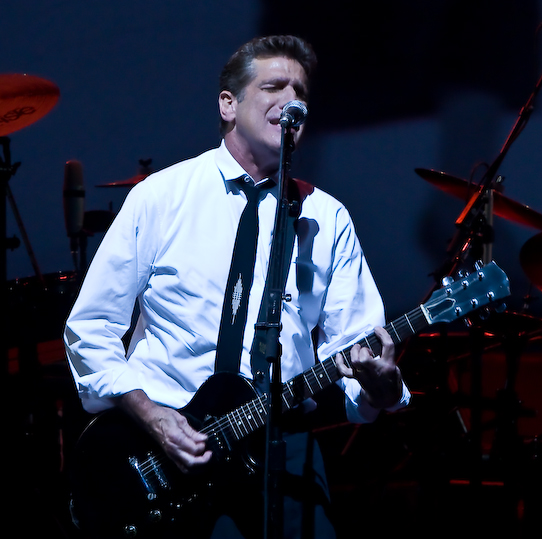
Glenn Frey

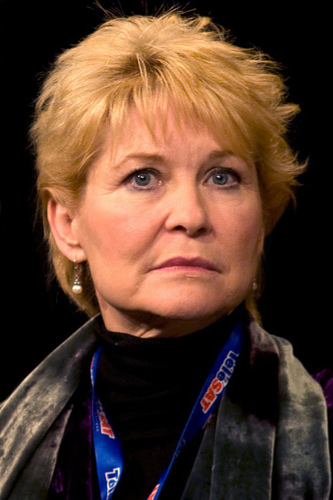
Dee Wallace

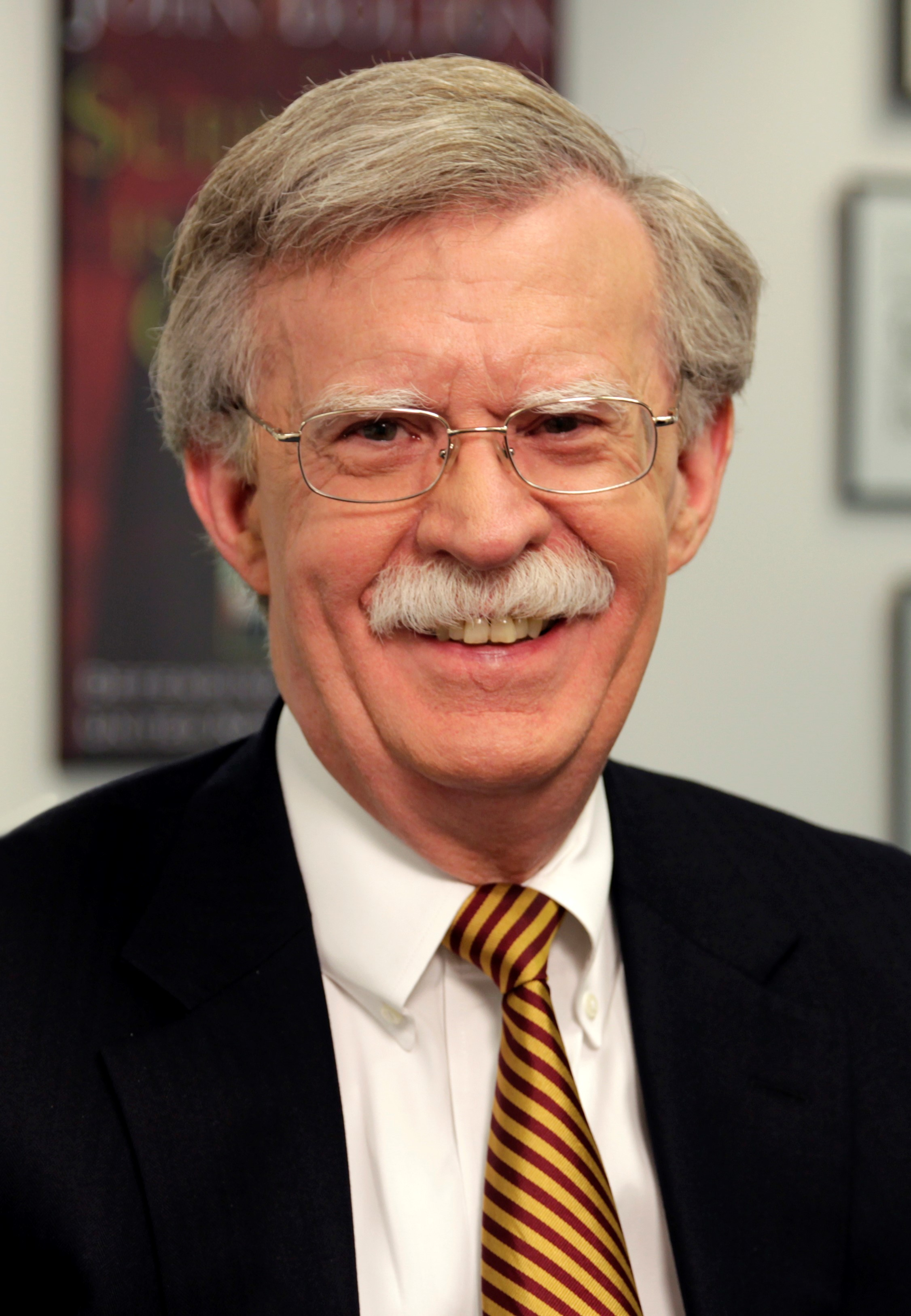
John Bolton

- November 1 – Anna Stuart, American actress
- November 5
  - Charles Bradley, African-American singer (d. 2017)
  - Bob Barr, American politician
  - Dallas Holm, American Christian musician
  - William Daniel Phillips, American physicist, Nobel Prize laureate
- November 6
  - Chi Coltrane, American musician (Thunder and Lightning)
  - Glenn Frey, American guitarist, singer (The Eagles) (d. 2016)
- November 7
  - Jim Houghton, American actor, director (d. 2024)
  - Tom Walker, American baseball player (d. 2023)
- November 9 – Kelly Harmon, American actress and model
- November 11 – Vincent Schiavelli, American actor (d. 2005)
- November 12
  - Skip Campbell, American politician (d. 2018)
  - Cliff Harris, American football player
  - Richard Roberts, American evangelist, son of Oral Roberts
- November 14
  - Robert Ginty, American actor, director (d. 2009)
  - Dee Wallace, American actress
- November 16 – Bonnie Greer, American-born British playwright, critic and novelist (d. 2026)
- November 17 – Howard Dean, American politician
- November 18
  - Andrea Marcovicci, American actress and singer
  - Jack Tatum, American football player (d. 2010)
- November 20
  - Harlee McBride, American actress
  - John Bolton, U.S. Ambassador to the U.N., National Security Advisor
  - Barbara Hendricks, American singer
  - Richard Masur, American actor, director and president of the Screen Actors Guild
- November 21 – Alphonse Mouzon, American jazz drummer (d. 2016)
- November 23 – Ron Bouchard, American NASCAR driver (d. 2015)
- November 24 – Joe Howard, American actor
- November 25 – Dale Webster, American surfer (d. 2025)
- November 26 – Gayle McCormick, American singer (Smith) (d. 2016)
- November 28 – Dick Morris, American political consultant
- November 30 – Stan Rogow, American television producer (d. 2023)

=== December ===
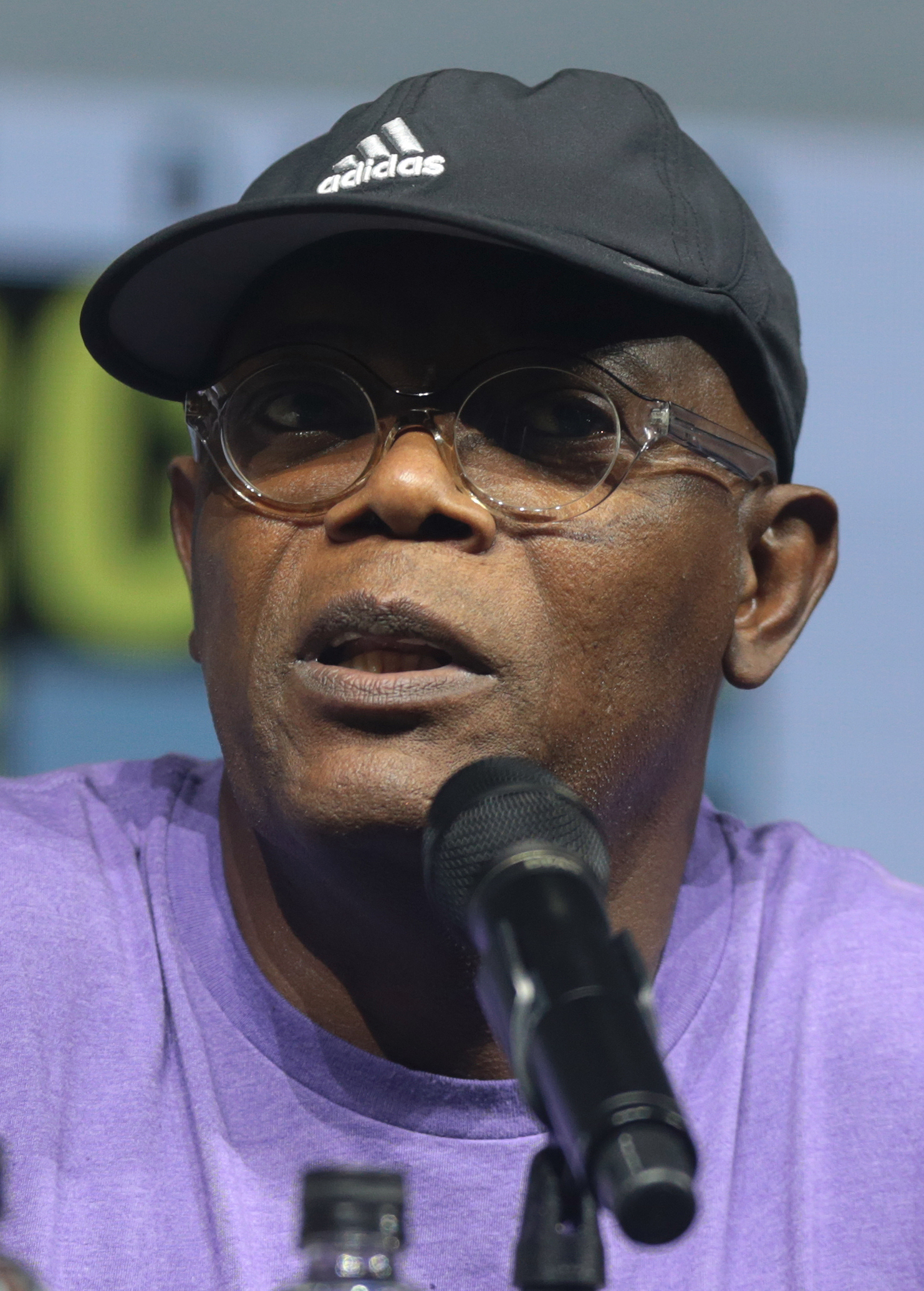
Samuel L. Jackson

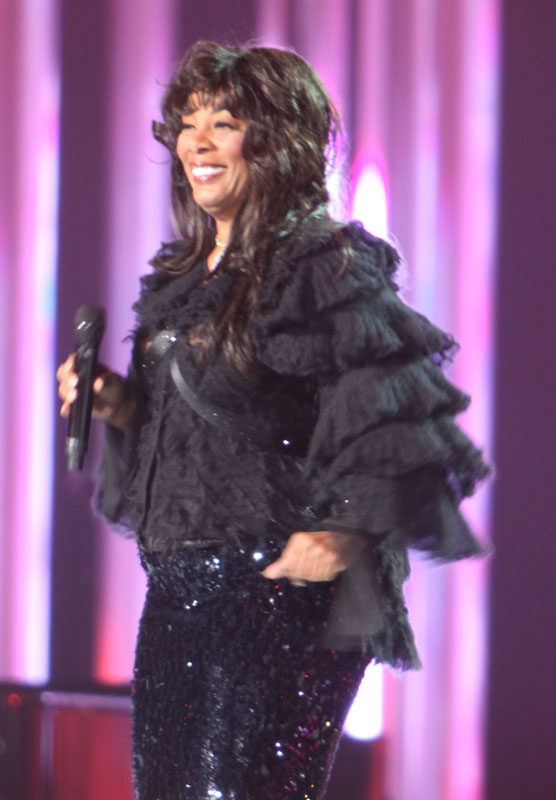
Donna Summer

- December 2 – T. C. Boyle, American writer
- December 3 – Rick Cua, American singer, evangelist
- December 6
  - Don Nickles, American politician
  - JoBeth Williams, American actress, director
- December 7
  - Gary Morris, American country singer, actor
  - Tony Thomas, American television producer
- December 9 – Gray H. Miller, senior judge of the U.S. District Court for the Southern District of Texas
- December 11 – Chester Thompson, American rock drummer
- December 12 – David K. Karnes, American politician
- December 13 – Ted Nugent, American musician, singer, songwriter and political activist
- December 16 – Pat Quinn, American lawyer and politician, 41st governor of Illinois
- December 18 – Edmund Kemper, American serial killer
- December 21 – Samuel L. Jackson, American actor and producer
- December 22
  - Flip Mark, American child actor
  - Lynne Thigpen, African-American actress (Godspell) (d. 2003)
- December 23 – Jim Ferguson, American guitarist, composer, educator, author and music journalist
- December 25 – Barbara Mandrell, American country singer, musician and actress
- December 26 – Candy Crowley, American news anchor
- December 27 – Ronnie Caldwell, American soul music, rhythm and blues musician (d. 1967)
- December 28 – Mary Weiss, American pop singer (The Shangri-Las) (d. 2024)
- December 31
  - Joe Dallesandro, American model, actor
  - Donna Summer, African-American singer, actress ("Love to Love You Baby") (d. 2012)

=== Undated ===
- Paul Siegfried – American attorney

== Deaths ==
- January 1 – Edna May, actress (born 1878)
- January 5 – Mary Dimmick Harrison, wife of President Benjamin Harrison (born 1858)
- January 7 – Charles C. Wilson, actor (born 1894)
- January 9 – Alvah Curtis Roebuck, businessman, co-founder of Sears, Roebuck (born 1864)
- January 12 – Herbert Allen Farmer, criminal (born 1891)
- January 24 – Bill Cody, actor (born 1891)
- January 28 – Anna Maria Gove, physician (b. 1867)
- January 30 – Orville Wright, pioneer aviator (born 1871)
- February 8 – Samuel P. Bush, businessman and industrialist (born 1863)
- March 10 – Zelda Fitzgerald, novelist and socialite, wife of F. Scott Fitzgerald (born 1900)
- April 5 – Angelo Joseph Rossi, Mayor of San Francisco (born 1878)
- June 1 – Sonny Boy Williamson I, blues musician and songwriter (born 1914)
- June 25 – William C. Lee, general (born 1895)
- July 4 – Albert Bates, criminal (born 1893)
- July 5
  - Charles Fillmore, Protestant mystic (born 1854)
  - Carole Landis, film actress (born 1919)
- July 9 – James Baskett, African-American actor (Uncle Remus in Disney's Song of the South) (born 1904)
- July 11 – Franz Weidenreich, anatomist (born 1873 in Germany)
- July 23 – D. W. Griffith, film director (born 1875)
- July 31 – Lucy Mercer Rutherfurd, mistress of Franklin D. Roosevelt (born 1891)
- August 16 – Babe Ruth, baseball player (born 1895)
- August 17 – Mariette Rheiner Garner, Second Lady of the United States as wife of John Nance Garner (born 1869)
- August 27 – Charles Evans Hughes, 11th Chief Justice of the Supreme Court (born 1862)
- August 30 – Alice Salomon, German-American social reformer (born 1872)
- August 31 – Billy Laughlin, American actor (born 1932)
- September 30 – Edith Roosevelt, First Lady of the United States and Second Lady of the United States as wife of Theodore Roosevelt (born 1861)
- November 23 – Hack Wilson, baseball player (born 1900)
- November 24 – Anna Jarvis, social activist (born 1864)

== See also ==
- List of American films of 1948
- Timeline of United States history (1930–1949)
