= Robert T. Crowley =

Robert T. Crowley may refer to:

- Robert Crowley (CIA) (1924–2000), Assistant Deputy Director of Clandestine Operations of the CIA
- R. T. Crowley (born 1948), pioneer in electronic commerce
