= Hell to the Naw Naw =

"Hell to Da Naw Naw Naw"

Song by Bishop Bullwinkle
- Released: January 1, 2014
- Genre: Soul
- Length: 4:53
- Songwriters: Robb Bigg; Bernard Thomas

"Hell to Da Naw Naw Naw" is a song by Bishop Bullwinkle. It became a viral Internet meme in 2014.

== Background ==
The song was originally released on January 1, 2014. Bullwinkle is seen in a white suit, wearing sunglasses and a cowboy hat in the outdoors shot video. Objects seen in the video are monkey statue and fire extinguisher resting on a podium. By July 22, 2015, the video went viral, attracting 200,000 views with over 4,000 likes. As of June 24, 2025, a video of the song had attracted over 100M views and over 810K likes. Another video has attracted 10,893,615 views and 186,611 likes. The song was even played on NBC.

== Composition ==
The song is in the key of A major.

== Reception ==
The reactions to the video and song have been mixed with some praising it while others are voicing their condemnation. The song is about the hypocrisy of some preachers.
