= Bishop Bullwinkle =

American singer and comedian (1948–2019)

- Born: Bernard Thomas; August 22, 1948; Tampa, Florida, U.S.
- Died: June 16, 2019 (aged 70) Plant City, Florida, U.S.
- Genre: Soul/Gospel
- Occupation: Musician

Bernard Thomas (August 22, 1948 – June 16, 2019), better known as Bishop Bullwinkle, was an American singer/comedian best known for appearing in the viral YouTube video "Hell to the Naw Naw".

== Background ==
Bishop Bullwinkle's real name was Bernard Thomas. The Bullwinkle part of his name came from a childhood nickname; while in school, a classmate of his wrote on the bulletin board, "Bernard Thomas is funny like Bullwinkle the moose". He was based in Florida. Thomas had mixed reactions to his style and song content, drawing both praise and condemnation. He is from Plant City, Florida.

In 2022, Azie Faison claimed that Bishop Bullwinkle was the same Bernard Thomas that was a government agent during the War on Drugs era.

=== "Hell to da Naw Naw Naw" ===
In the music video, which is shot outdoors, Thomas is seen in a white suit, wearing sunglasses and a white hat. It was originally released January 1, 2014. The props used are a podium with a white monkey statue and fire extinguisher resting on it. By July 22, 2015, the video went viral and got over 200,000 views with over 4,000 likes. As of August 15, 2020, a video of the song attracted over 95 million views and 780,000 likes. Another video has attracted over 12 million views and over 218,000 likes. The song was even played on NBC.

A video of an 86-year-old grandmother dancing to the song went viral in a very short time. Beverly Jenkins uploaded the video of her grandmother Claudia Haggerty dancing to the song. By September 4, 2015, it had attracted 3 million views since it was posted. It was shared over 100,000 times on Facebook.

Bullwinkle attracted mixed reactions for his video and song, which is about the hypocrisy of some preachers and parishioners.

== Appearances ==
Along with Clarence Carter, Sir Charles Jones, Theodis Ealey, and Denise LaSalle, he was scheduled to appear at the 13th Annual Chi-Town Blues Festival at Merrillville's Star Plaza Theatre on March 4, 2017. On March 11, he was scheduled to appear at the 11th Annual Motor City Blues Festival, an event which included Sir Charles Jones, Willie Clayton, Bigg Robb, Shirley Brown, and TK Soul. The following June, he was booked to appear at the Southern Soul and Blues Lovers Festival in Tuscaloosa, Alabama. Thomas was booked to appear at the Jacksonville Veterans Memorial Arena on September 9, but it was rescheduled for November 10.

== Death ==
Thomas died on June 16, 2019, in Tampa, Florida. His cause of death was a heart attack. He was 70 years old. The funeral ceremony was on June 29, 2019.

== Discography ==
=== Compilation albums ===
Title	Album details
The Da Vinci Code	Released: August 16, 2019; Label: Music Access; Formats: Digital download, streaming

=== Singles ===
==== As lead artist ====
Title	Year	Album
"Some Preachers"	2015	The Da Vinci Code
"Pouring Water On a Drowning Man" (featuring Sir Jonathan Burton)	2019	The Da Vinci Code
"No Woman, No Cry"	2019	The Da Vinci Code
"Is It Real"	2019	The Da Vinci Code

==== As featured artist ====
Title	Year	Album
"I Can't Be Faithful" (Pokey Bear featuring Bishop Bullwinkle)	2017	Bear Season
