= Chris Madden (designer) =

American businesswoman (1948–2022)

- Born: Ann Christine Casson; June 1, 1948; Rockville Centre, New York, U.S.
- Died: March 2, 2022 (aged 73); Vero Beach, Florida, U.S.
- Education: Fashion Institute of Technology
- Occupations: Interior designer, television host, author, businesswoman
- Years active: 1976–2022

Ann Christine Madden (née Casson; June 1, 1948 – March 2, 2022) was an American interior designer, television host, author, and businesswoman. As founder and chief executive officer of Chris Madden Inc, she built a multimillion-dollar home furnishings company through partnerships with Mohawk Industries, Bassett Furniture, and JCPenney.

== Early life ==
Ann Christine Casson was born in Rockville Centre, New York, on June 1, 1948. Her father, Edward Gaynor Casson, worked as a sales executive for the Mohawk Brush Company; her mother, Ann Marie Hill, was a housewife. One of nine children, she learned to sew from her mother and often visited her father's office in Manhattan. At age six, she appeared in Mademoiselle, and continued modelling in print-ads and catalogs.

After graduating from St. Agnes High School, she was given a full scholarship to the Fashion Institute of Technology in New York City. Soon after she worked in the photography department of Sports Illustrated. She later worked in the publicity departments at publishers Random House, G.P. Putnam & Son, and Farrar Straus and Groux.

== Career ==
Madden started her own public relations firm in 1976, and then started writing books on decorating and show houses. After her early books such as Interior Visions (Stewart, Tabori & Chang, 1988), Rooms with a View (PBC International, 1992), and Kitchens (Clarkson Potter, 1993), Madden was selected by HGTV as one of their first four hosts. Her show Interiors by Design ran for eight seasons (1995–2003). In 1997, she became the design correspondent on The Oprah Winfrey Show. The same year, Madden's A Room of Her Own was published by Clarkson Potter. It sold over 100,000 copies and went into 11 printings.

Madden launched a furniture line with Bassett Furniture Co in 1998, after originally being approached to as a spokesperson. After two years in development, a 70-piece Chris Madden line launched in 2000. By 2002, the line had sold over 100 million dollars' worth of product. This success with Bassett led to licensing deals with Austin Candles and Mohawk Flooring.

JCPenney announced their partnership with Madden in 2003. She served as Penney's home collection spokeswoman and design expert. She developed and designed a line of products that launched in 2004. There were 675 items in the launch, the largest in Penney's history. Madden's book Haven: Finding the Key to Your Personal Decorating Style (Clarkson Potter) was released at the same time. By 2005, her JCPenney collection had expanded to two thousand pieces.

Madden began Project Katrina in 2007 to help victims of Hurricane Katrina. Four homes in Pass Christian, Mississippi were furnished with JCPenney products from Madden's personal warehouse. Madden's philanthropy continued in 2008 when she partnered with Blue Star Mothers of America in Operation Cozy Comfort – replacing regulation army blankets with Chris Madden plush blankets from JCPenney.

Madden was appointed to the board of trustees of the Fashion Institute of Technology in 2010. She served in that capacity until 2015. The same year, Madden's newest design book The Soul of a House – Decorating with Warmth, Style and Comfort was published by Rizzoli International.

== Personal life and death ==
Madden was diagnosed with hereditary hemorrhagic telangiectasia, a rare genetic disorder, during her thirties. In 1974, she married Kevin Madden, publisher of House and Garden, Self, and Bon Appétit magazines. They met in the early 1970s, and remained married until her death. Together, they had two children: Patrick and Nicholas.

Madden died at the age of 73 on March 2, 2022, at a hospital in Vero Beach, Florida. Prior to her death, she sustained head injuries after falling at her home.
