= Paul Siegfried =

American attorney based in New York City (born 1948)

Paul Siegfried (born 1948) is an American attorney based in New York City.

== Career ==
Siegfried is the former executive director of the Mayor's Advisory Committee on the Judiciary for Mayors Abraham Beame, Ed Koch, David Dinkins and Rudy Giuliani. Siegfried's role was to identify and recommend judicial candidates to serve as judges in New York City. Politico, a political newspaper, reported in a piece about Giuliani's judicial appointments that Siegfried is a registered Democrat and could have been replaced by Giuliani. Politico's Ben Smith wrote:

"Under Giuliani, the chairman was Paul Curran, a former Republican U.S. Attorney; its executive director was Paul Siegfried, a Democrat who had served in that position under other mayors and whose focus was qualifications, not ideology or judicial philosophy. Again, Giuliani could have replaced Siegfried, as Bloomberg did. He chose not to."

When Michael Bloomberg became Mayor of New York, Siegfried resigned to avoid being removed in Bloomberg's purge of staffers associated with Giuliani. In an article in the New York Law Journal, Paul Curran, the former head of the Mayor's Advisory Committee on the Judiciary, said of Bloomberg's decision to allow Siegfried to resign:

"It was a big mistake not to retain Paul Siegfried. ...(Siegfried has) done the job well for a long time, and had built up relations with judges, lawyers and prosecutors who would comment candidly on the qualifications of prospective judges and judges seeking reappointment."

== Political donations ==
Federal Election Commission disclosures and OpenSecrets show that Siegfried donated $2300 to the Rudy Giuliani Presidential Exploratory Committee and $2000 to the presidential campaign of Hillary Clinton, Hillary Clinton for President Exploratory Committee. In the 2006 election cycle, he gave a total of $4100 to Hillary Clinton's reelection campaign. In the year 2000, he donated $1000 to Giuliani's Senate campaign.

== Family ==
Siegfried is married to Wendy Siegfried and has two stepsons, Alexander and Angus Dillon, and one biological son, Evan Siegfried. Evan Siegfried worked as a press aide on Giuliani's presidential campaign and before that for Senator Bill Nelson (D-FL).
