= 57th Street Art Fair =

Art fair in Chicago

The 57th Street Art Fair is Chicago's oldest juried art fair. Founded in 1948, it is held the first weekend in June annually on 57th Street between Kimbark and Kenwood Avenues, in the Chicago neighborhood of Hyde Park, directly north of the University of Chicago campus. It is "the only large, international not-for-profit art fair devoted to exhibiting original art, operated solely for the benefit of the artists, and run by a small group of volunteers without any institutional support."

== History ==
The 57th Street Art Fair was founded in 1948 by Mary Louise Womer, proprietor of The Little Gallery on 57th Street, which was then a thriving arts colony, "a time of oddballs and crazy people (in later years many of them famous as writers, scientists, and artists) and extraordinary, sometimes nutty, local events." Ms. Womer wished to acquaint the large number of young artists in the neighborhood with each other, and decided to hold an outdoor fair on Saturday and Sunday, October 16 and 17, 1948. 51 artists paid 50 cents each to exhibit, and by Sunday's end, had sold $500 worth of art. The fair was so popular, it was continued the next year with a committee of organizers. By 1952 there were sales of over $10,000.

The early fairs were not juried, but they contained a number of exceptional artists. Claes Oldenburg's earliest recorded sales of artworks were at the 57th Street Art Fair, sometime before 1957, where he sold 5 items for a total price of $25. The fair became juried in 1963, when it had grown too large for the available space.

The fair was suspended for one year in 2020 due to the COVID-19 pandemic, and resumed in 2021.

== Today ==
The 57th Street Art Fair is held on the first full weekend in June. More than 20,000 visitors see the works of some 250 artists on those two days. Continuing the spirit of the first fairs, all of the artworks are real and original, not reproductions, and the fair is free and open to the public.

== See also ==
- Juried competition
