= Mike McCoy (businessman) =

American football executive (1948–2021)

Profile
- Position: Executive

Personal information
- Born: September 10, 1948; Stillwater, Oklahoma, U.S.
- Died: October 17, 2021 (aged 73); Dallas, Texas, U.S.

Career information
- College: Oklahoma

Career history
- Dallas Cowboys (1989–1996)

Awards and highlights
- 3× Super Bowl champion (XXVII, XXVIII, XXX)

Michael Vernon McCoy (September 10, 1948 – October 17, 2021) was an American businessman. As a minority owner and vice-president of the Dallas Cowboys in the National Football League (NFL), he was credited with inventing the trade value draft chart. He also worked in the oil and gas industry.

== Early life ==
McCoy was born in Stillwater, Oklahoma, on September 10, 1948. He attended the University of Oklahoma and obtained a degree in petroleum engineering. He then worked in the oil and gas industry, rose through the ranks to become a Vice President at Texas Oil and Gas Company in Fort Smith, Arkansas, and developed an expertise in drilling.

In 1981, he and a business partner, future Dallas Cowboys owner Jerry Jones, co-founded Arkoma Production Company, which was active in gas-rich areas such as northwest Arkansas and was able to profit from more than 500 of some 2000 wells they had drilled.

In 1986, McCoy and Jones sold the company to Arkla, a natural gas company, for $175 million. They were accused of having unjustly enriched themselves in the sale, but were eventually exonerated in court.

== Career in sports management ==
When Jones bought the Dallas Cowboys in February 1989, McCoy became a minority owner with a 5% stake in the NFL franchise. He was named vice president of the football club one year later.

In the run up to the 1991 NFL draft, Jones and head coach Jimmy Johnson wanted to come up with a system to help them evaluate NFL draft trades quickly. McCoy put together a trade value draft chart that assigned values to each draft pick and a numeric total for each deal. He did this by examining trades from the past decade and giving each one a point value.

With the success of the Cowboys during the 1990s and the departure of key personnel such as Dave Wannstedt and Norv Turner, the trade-value draft chart gained prominence in the NFL and every team now employs a version of it. In spite of draft chart being the brainchild of McCoy, it is referred to as the "Jimmy Johnson Chart". Five years after formulating it, McCoy left the Cowboys to return to the oil and gas industry.

== Personal life ==
McCoy was married to Joni for 30 years until his death. He had four children: Jeff, Kim, Madison, and Matthew. On October 17, 2021, he died in Dallas, Texas, one month after his 73rd birthday.
