= R. T. Crowley =

EDI pioneer (born 1948)

Robert T. Crowley (born March 2, 1948) is a pioneer in the development and practice of Electronic Data Interchange (EDI), an early component of electronic commerce.

Crowley participated in the development of the early forms of EDI, working with Edward A. Guilbert, the creator of the technology, from the 1977 onwards, and assisted in the development of UN/EDIFACT, the international EDI standard developed through the United Nations. Active in many EDI projects around the world, he served as Chair of ANSI ASC X12, the US national standards body for EDI, from 1993 to 1995.

He is the founder of the EDI standards committee for the ocean transport industry (OCEAN), as well as the US Customs Electronic Systems Advisory Committee (CESAC), advising the US Customs Service (USCS) on matters of electronic commerce. Robert was also a founding member of TOPAS (Terminal Operator and Port Authority Subcommittee) that initiated EDI use between ship lines and terminal operators/ports.

Robert also served as Chair of the X12 Security Task Group for a number of years, and was one of the authors of the X12 technical report on the use of Extensible Markup Language XML for conducting EDI. He is now vice chair of ISO Technical Committee 154 US Technical Advisory Group (ISO TC154 US TAG), and Editor of document ISO8601 Representation of Dates and Times.
